= List of members of the Parliament of Fiji (1966–1972) =

The members of the Parliament of Fiji from 1966 until 1972 consisted of members of the House of Representatives elected between 26 September and 8 October 1966 (at which point it was the Legislative Council), and members appointed to the Senate when it was created at independence in 1970.

== House of Representatives ==
Constituency	Member	Party	Notes
Fijian Communal (11 seats)
Cakaudrove	Jone Naisara	Alliance Party	
Lau–Rotuma	Jonati Mavoa	Alliance Party	
Lomaiviti–Kadavu	Solomone Momoivalu	Alliance Party	
Macuata–Bua	Emosi Vuakatagane	Alliance Party	
North West Viti Levu	Sakeasi Waqanivavalagi	Alliance Party	
Rewa–Suva	Alipate Sikivou	Alliance Party	Died in 1970, replaced by Uraia Koroi (Alliance)
South Central Viti Levu	David Toganivalu	Alliance Party	
South West Viti Levu	Peniame Naqasima	Alliance Party	
Tailevu	William Toganivalu	Alliance Party	
Council of Chief nominees	George Cakobau	–	
Council of Chief nominees	Losalini Raravuya Dovi	–	
Indo-Fijian Communal (9 seats)
North-East Vanua Levu	James Madhavan	Federation Party	
North-East Viti Levu	C. A. Shah	Federation Party	
North Eastern	Ram Jati Singh	Federation Party	
North-West Viti Levu	R. D. Patel	Federation Party	
South-Central Viti Levu	M. T. Khan	Federation Party	Replaced by Ujagar Singh following the 1968 by-elections
South-West Viti Levu	A. D. Patel	Federation Party	
Suva	Irene Jai Narayan	Federation Party	
Tailevu–Rewa	K. C. Ramrakha	Federation Party	
West Viti Levu	Sidiq Koya	Federation Party	
General Communal (7 seats)
Eastern and Central	Wesley Barrett	Alliance Party	
Northern	Harold Brockett Gibson	Independent	
Suva	John Falvey	Alliance Party	
Suva	Charles Stinson	Independent	
Suva	William Yee	Alliance Party	
West Viti Levu	Ronald Kermode	Alliance Party	
West Viti Levu	Robin Yarrow	Alliance Party	
Cross-voting (9 seats)
Central Fijian	Edward Cakobau	Alliance Party	
Central General	Douglas Walkden-Brown	Alliance Party	
Central Indo-Fijian	Abdul Lateef	Alliance Party	
Northern and Eastern Fijian	Kamisese Mara	Alliance Party	
Northern and Eastern Fijian General	Lindsay Verrier	Alliance Party	
Northern and Eastern Indo-Fijian	Vijay R. Singh	Alliance Party	
Western Fijian	Joshua Toganivalu	Alliance Party	
Western General	Loloma Livingston	Alliance Party	
Western Indo-Fijian	K. S. Reddy	Alliance Party	
Source: Pacific Islands Monthly

== Senate ==
Class	Member
President	Robert Munro
Great Council of Chiefs' Nominees	Napolioni Dawai
Great Council of Chiefs' Nominees	Jone Mataitini
Great Council of Chiefs' Nominees	Livai Nasilivata
Great Council of Chiefs' Nominees	Apakuki Nanovo
Great Council of Chiefs' Nominees	Meli Salabogi
Great Council of Chiefs' Nominees	Kavaia Tagivetaua
Great Council of Chiefs' Nominees	Livai Volavola
Great Council of Chiefs' Nominees	Tiale Vuiyasawa
Council of Rotuma's Nominee	Wilson Inia
Leader of the Opposition's Nominees	Glanville Lalabalavu
Leader of the Opposition's Nominees	Eqbal Mohammed
Leader of the Opposition's Nominees	Isikeli Nadalo
Leader of the Opposition's Nominees	Harish Sharma
Leader of the Opposition's Nominees	Sarvan Singh
Leader of the Opposition's Nominees	Mosese Tuisawau
Prime Minister's Nominees	Felix Emberson
Prime Minister's Nominees	Penaia Ganilau
Prime Minister's Nominees	Ramanlal Kapadia
Prime Minister's Nominees	M. T. Khan
Prime Minister's Nominees	Anaseini Qionibaravi
Prime Minister's Nominees	Eddie Wong
Source: USP, USP
