= List of members of the Parliament of Fiji (1972–1977) =

The members of the Parliament of Fiji from 1972 until 1977 consisted of members of the House of Representatives elected between 15 and 29 April 1972, and members of the nominated Senate.

== House of Representatives ==
Constituency	Member	Party	Notes
Fijian Communal (12 seats)
Ba East–Ra	Maleli Raibe	Alliance Party	
Ba West	Solomone Naivalu	Alliance Party	
Bua–Macuata	Militoni Leweniqila	Alliance Party	
Cakaudrove	Jone Naisara	Alliance Party	
Kadavu–Suva City West	Seci Nawalowalo	Alliance Party	
Lau	Jonati Mavoa	Alliance Party	
Lomaiviti-Rotuma	Manasa Tabuadua	Alliance Party	
Nadroga–Navosa	Peniame Naqasima	Alliance Party	
Naitasiri	Livai Nasilivata	Alliance Party	
Rewa–Serua–Namosi	Sakeasi Butadroka	Alliance Party	Became an independent in November 1973, then established the Fijian Nationalist Party in January 1974
Suva City East	Uraia Koroi	Alliance Party	
Tailevu	William Toganivalu	Alliance Party	
Indo-Fijian Communal (12 seats)
Ba	R. D. Patel	National Federation Party	
Ba–Lautoka Rural	Ujagar Singh	National Federation Party	
Labasa–Bua	Ram Jati Singh	National Federation Party	
Lautoka	Sidiq Koya	National Federation Party	
Nadi	H. M. Lodhia	National Federation Party	
Nasinu–Vunidawa	Chandra Pillai	National Federation Party	
Nausori–Levuka	K. C. Ramrakha	National Federation Party	
Savusavu–Macuata East	James Madhavan	National Federation Party	Madhavan died in 1973. Sarvan Singh won the resulting by-election
Sigatoka	Harish Sharma	National Federation Party	
Suva City East	Irene Jai Narayan	National Federation Party	
Suva City West–Navua	Vijay Parmanandam	National Federation Party	
Tavua–Vaileka	C. A. Shah	National Federation Party	
General Communal (3 seats)
Northern and Eastern	Wesley Barrett	Alliance Party	
Suva and Central	William Yee	Alliance Party	
Western	Fred Elboune	Alliance Party	
Fijian National (10 seats)
East Central	George Cakobau	Alliance Party	Cakobau was appointed Governor-General in 1973. Penaia Ganilau won the resulting by-election
Lau-Cakaudrove	Kamisese Mara	Alliance Party	
North-Central	Josua Toganivalu	Alliance Party	
North-Eastern	Sakiasi Waqanivavalagi	Alliance Party	
North-Western	Apisai Tora	National Federation Party	
South-Central Suva West	David Toganivalu	Alliance Party	
South-Eastern	Losalini Raravuya Dovi	Alliance Party	
South-Western	Isikeli Nadalo	National Federation Party	
Suva East	Edward Cakobau	Alliance Party	Died in 1973; replaced by Mosese Qionibaravi (Alliance)
Vanua Levu North and West	Atunaisa Maitoga	National Federation Party	
Indo-Fijian National 10 seats)
East Central	Vijay R. Singh	Alliance Party	
Lau–Cakaudrove	James Shankar Singh	Alliance Party	
North-Central	K. N. Govind	Alliance Party	
North-Eastern	M. T. Khan	Alliance Party	
North-Western	Kalu Singh	National Federation Party	
South Central Suva West	P. K. Bhindi	Alliance Party	
South-Eastern	K. S. Reddy	Alliance Party	
South-Western	Anirudh Kuver	National Federation Party	
Suva East	Mohammed Ramzan	Alliance Party	
Vanua Levu North and West	Subramani Basawaiya	National Federation Party	
General National (5 seats)
Eastern	Douglas Walkden-Brown	Alliance Party	
Northern	Robin Yarrow	Alliance Party	
Southern	Charles Stinson	Alliance Party	
Vanua Levu–Lau	Edward Beddoes	Alliance Party	
Western	Edmund March	National Federation Party	
Source: Handbook of Fiji

== Senate ==
Class	Member	Notes
President	Robert Munro	
Great Council of Chiefs' Nominees	Napolioni Dawai	
Great Council of Chiefs' Nominees	Jone Mataitini	Replaced by Glanville Lalabalavu in October 1976
Great Council of Chiefs' Nominees	Apakuki Nanovo	
Great Council of Chiefs' Nominees	Meli Salabogi	Replaced by Jone Kikau in 1973
Great Council of Chiefs' Nominees	Inoke Tabua	
Great Council of Chiefs' Nominees	Kavaia Tagivetaua	
Great Council of Chiefs' Nominees	Livai Volavola	
Great Council of Chiefs' Nominees	Tiale Vuiyasawa	Replaced by Josaia Tavaiqia in 1973
Council of Rotuma's Nominee	Wilson Inia	
Leader of the Opposition's Nominees	Glanville Lalabalavu	Replaced by Asela Logavatu in 1973
Leader of the Opposition's Nominees	Eqbal Mohammed	Replaced by Bakshi Balwant Singh Mal in 1976
Leader of the Opposition's Nominees	Jai Ram Reddy	Replaced by Ratilal Patel in 1977
Leader of the Opposition's Nominees	Kaur Baltan Singh	
Leader of the Opposition's Nominees	Sarvan Singh	Replaced by Shiromaniam Madhavan in 1974
Leader of the Opposition's Nominees	Mosese Tuisawau	Replaced by Chandra Prakash Bidesi in 1976
Prime Minister's Nominees	Felix Emberson	Replaced by Tomasi Vakatora in 1976
Prime Minister's Nominees	John Falvey	
Prime Minister's Nominees	Penaia Ganilau	Replaced by Vivekanand Sharma in 1973
Prime Minister's Nominees	Ramanlal Kapadia	
Prime Minister's Nominees	Anaseini Qionibaravi	Replaced by Joeli Nacola in 1976
Prime Minister's Nominees	Eddie Wong	Replaced by Charles Walker
Source: USP, USP, USP, USP
