= National Congress of Fiji =

Political party in Fiji

The National Congress of Fiji was a Fijian political party that existed from 1965 to 1967. It was created to represent Indo-Fijians as a rival to the Citizens Federation. It soon merged, along with the General Electors Association, which mainly represented Fijians of European descent, to form the Alliance Party.

== Origins ==
The National Congress of Fiji formed on 10 January 1965 at the Kisan Sangh Hall in Lautoka, in front of 1,500 farmers, led by Ayodhya Prasad. The Congress sent a telegram to the Secretary General of the United Nations stating that 80,000 Fiji Indians wanted to settle in a foreign country. The purpose of the telegram was to draw the attention of the United Nations to the plight of the Fiji Indians. The telegram had the desired result, as under pressure from the United Nations the Colonial Secretary called a Constitutional Conference for 26 July 1965.

Prasad and the Congress were bitterly opposed to A. D. Patel and the Federation Party. Prasad believed that A.D. Patel actually did not want independence for Fiji and used the fear of common roll to deter other groups from agreeing to independence. On 21 July 1965, before the delegates departed for the London constitutional conference, the Congress called a meeting in which Fijian and European members of the Legislative Council were invited. The purpose of the meeting was to ensure that delegates to the London Conference were aware that there was at least one group of Fiji Indians willing to work with other groups to achieve independence.

== Merger ==
In October 1965, Prasad met Ratu Kamisese Mara and suggested the establishment of a new political party made up of the Fijian Association and National Congress of Fiji. Kamisese Mara got the Europeans to join up as well and several meetings were held before it was decided on 29 November 1965 to form the Alliance Party. The Alliance was formed on 12 March 1966 with the coming together of the Fijian Association, National Congress of Fiji, General Electors Association, Suva Rotuman Association, Rotuman Convention, Chinese Association, All-Fiji Muslim Political Front, Fiji Minority Party and the Tongan Organization, along with Vijay R. Singh, who joined it independently.

For the 1966 elections, the Alliance Party asked the National Congress to put forward names of its candidates. Prasad put his own name for the Western cross-voting seat, while K. S. Reddy was nominated for the Nadi/Nadroga seat and James Shankar Singh for the Ba seat. Singh, was able to use his influence with Kamisese Mara to have the Western cross-voting ticket given to Reddy and the Nadi/Nadroga ticket (against Patel) given to Prasad. This incident showed both Prasad and Singh trying to outmaneuver each other for the leadership of Indians in the Alliance Party. Prasad lost to Patel by 7601 votes to 4025 votes and Reddy won against his Federation party opponent. The Alliance party took 23 seats during this election.

Originally Indians had joined the Alliance Party as members of the National Congress, but Singh encouraged people to join the Party directly. Prasad believed that the Indians would have a better say in the Alliance Party if they joined it through the National Congress but was powerless to prevent the move to direct membership as he was afraid that this would be seen as an attempt by him to destabilise the Alliance Party. With failing health he could do little and the National Congress was wound up in 1967.
