= 1966 Fijian general election =

- 26 September–8 October 1966

All 36 seats in the Legislative Council 18 seats needed for a majority
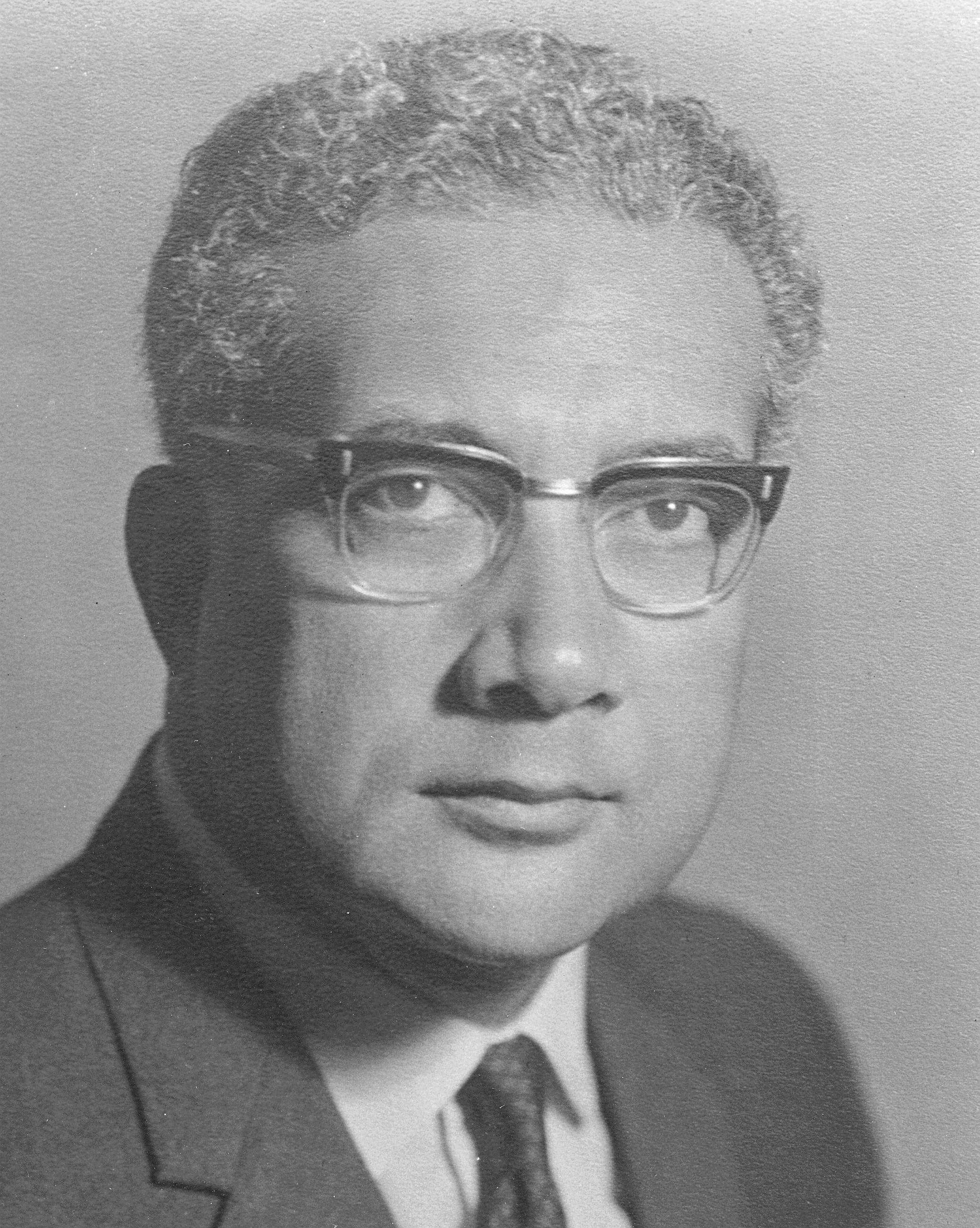

	First party	Second party
Leader	Kamisese Mara	A. D. Patel
Party	Alliance	Federation Party
Seats won	23	9
Popular vote	214,872	113,310
Percentage	51.94%	27.39%
Elected Chief Minister
Kamisese Mara
Alliance

General elections were held in Fiji between 26 September and 8 October 1966, the last before independence in 1970 and the first held under universal suffrage. The result was a victory for the Alliance Party, which won 23 of the 34 elected seats. Its leader Kamisese Mara became the country's first Chief Minister the following year.

== Background ==
A constitutional conference was held in London in 1965, which resulted in the Legislative Council being reorganised to consist of 36 seats; 14 for Fijians and other Pacific Islanders (two of which were nominated by the Great Council of Chiefs), 12 for Indo-Fijians and 10 for all other ethnic groups. The total number of registered voters was 156,683; 75,768 Indo-Fijians, 74,575 Fijians and 6,340 General electors.

Members of the Legislative Council were elected from two types of constituencies; communal and cross-voting, with voters being able to cast four votes each. Each voter cast a single vote in one of the 25 communal constituencies, in which they could only vote for a candidate of their own ethnicity. In the three three-seat cross-voting constituencies, voters voted for a candidate from each of the three ethnic groups.

== Campaign ==
For the first time, the elections were a largely partisan event, dominated by the Fijian Alliance Party and the Indo-Fijian Federation Party. A total of 79 candidates, including three women, contested the elections.

== Results ==
Party	Votes	%	Seats
Alliance Party	214,872	51.94	23
Federation Party	113,310	27.39	9
National Democratic Party	6,874	1.66	0
Independents	78,644	19.01	2
Nominated members			2
Total	413,700	100.00	36
Valid votes	413,700	93.16	
Invalid/blank votes	30,372	6.84	
Total votes	444,072	100.00	
Source: Fiji Elections

=== By constituency ===
Seat	Candidate	Party	Votes	%	Notes
Fijian seats
Cakaudrove	Jone Naisara	Alliance Party	4,908		Elected
Cakaudrove	Anare M. Tuidraki	Independent	949		
Cakaudrove	Invalid votes		314	–	
Lau–Rotuma	Jonati Mavoa	Alliance Party	Unopposed		Elected
Lomaiviti/Kadavu	Solomone Momoivalu	Alliance Party	Unopposed		Elected
Macuata/Bua	Emosi Vuakatagane	Alliance Party	2,885		Elected
Macuata/Bua	Militoni Vereaqali Leweniqila	Independent	1,774		
Macuata/Bua	Invalid votes		207	–	
North West Viti Levu	Sakeasi Waqanivavalagi	Alliance Party	6,354		Elected
North West Viti Levu	Isaia Vakabua	Independent	1,670		
North West Viti Levu	Jone Ravunakana	Independent	1,268		
North West Viti Levu	Invalid votes		191	–	
Rewa–Suva	Alipate Sikivou	Alliance Party	4,427		Elected
Rewa–Suva	Jone Cure Mataitini	Independent	1,779		
Rewa–Suva	Noa Niubalavu Nawalowalo	Independent	1,268		
Rewa–Suva	Invalid votes		158	–	
South Central Viti Levu	David Toganivalu	Alliance Party	4,368		Elected
South Central Viti Levu	Penaia Lalabalavu Latianara	Independent	981		
South Central Viti Levu	Meli Radelaiburelevu Loki	Independent	873		
South Central Viti Levu	Ifereimi Nakaiwalu	Independent	205		
South Central Viti Levu	Invalid votes		182	–	
South West Viti Levu	Peniame Naqasima	Alliance Party	5,600		Elected
South West Viti Levu	Apisai Tora	National Democratic Party	2,632		
South West Viti Levu	Invalid votes		133	–	
Tailevu	William Brown Toganivalu	Alliance Party	3,347		Elected
Tailevu	Livai Volavola	Independent	1,530		
Tailevu	Meli Saronicava Baleilakeba	Independent	383		
Tailevu	Invalid votes		187	–	
Council of Chiefs nominees	George Cakobau				Elected
Council of Chiefs nominees	Losalini Raravuya Dovi				Elected
General seats
Eastern and Central	Wesley Barrett	Alliance Party	816		Elected
Eastern and Central	Robert Spowart	Independent	132		
Eastern and Central	Invalid votes		11	–	
Northern	Harold Brockett Gibson	Independent	392		Elected
Northern	Fred Archibald	Independent	292		Unseated
Northern	Hugh Thaggard	Independent	151		
Northern	Lawrence Simpson	Independent	73		
Northern	Invalid votes		33	–	
Suva	John Falvey	Alliance Party	1,544		Re-elected
Suva	Charles Stinson	Independent	1,384		Elected
Suva	William Yee	Alliance Party	1,381		Elected
Suva	Margaret Bain	Alliance Party	1,288		
Suva	Invalid votes		4	–	
West Viti Levu	Ronald Kermode	Alliance Party	Unopposed		Re-elected
West Viti Levu	Robin Yarrow	Alliance Party	Unopposed		Elected
Indo-Fijian seats
North-East Vanua Levu	James Madhavan	Federation Party	5,049	66.9	Re-elected
North-East Vanua Levu	Gaya Prasad	Independent	2,494	33.1	
North-East Vanua Levu	Invalid votes		320	–	
North-East Viti Levu	C. A. Shah	Federation Party	3,799	58.2	Re-elected
North-East Viti Levu	Vishnu Deo	Alliance Party	1,955	30.0	
North-East Viti Levu	V. P. Bajpai	Independent	770	11.8	
North-East Viti Levu	Invalid votes		100	–	
North Eastern	Ram Jati Singh	Federation Party	2,328	65.3	Elected
North Eastern	Harish Chandra Kohli	Independent	1,238	34.7	
North Eastern	Invalid votes		206	–	
North-West Viti Levu	R. D. Patel	Federation Party	4,704		Elected
North-West Viti Levu	James Shankar Singh	Alliance Party	4,421		
North-West Viti Levu	Invalid votes		104	–	
South-Central Viti Levu	M. T. Khan	Federation Party	4,380		Elected
South-Central Viti Levu	Ramanlal I. Kapadia	Independent	1,650		
South-Central Viti Levu	B.D. Moti	Independent	67		
South-Central Viti Levu	B. D. Lakshman	Independent	24		
South-Central Viti Levu	Invalid votes		150	–	
South-West Viti Levu	A. D. Patel	Federation Party	7,601		Re-elected
South-West Viti Levu	Ayodhya Prasad	Alliance Party	4,025		
South-West Viti Levu	Invalid votes		167	–	
Suva	Irene Jai Narayan	Federation Party	5,676	67.1	Elected
Suva	Andrew Deoki	Independent	2,779	32.9	Unseated
Suva	Invalid votes		108	–	
Tailevu-Rewa	K. C. Ramrakha	Federation Party	3,220	71.5	Elected
Tailevu-Rewa	K. B. Singh	Independent	677	15.1	
Tailevu-Rewa	Ram Lochan Regan	Independent	604	13.4	
Tailevu-Rewa	Invalid votes		105	–	
West Viti Levu Indian	Sidiq Koya	Federation Party	6,318		Re-elected
West Viti Levu Indian	Jaswant Singh	Independent	2,221		
West Viti Levu Indian	C. A. Patel	Independent	19		
West Viti Levu Indian	Invalid votes		201	–	
Source: Pacific Islands Monthly

Cross-voting seats
Constituency	Ethnic group	Candidate	Party	Votes	%	Notes
Central	Fijian	Edward Cakobau	Alliance Party	Unopposed		Re-elected
Central	General	Douglas Walkden-Brown	Alliance Party	21,208		Elected
Central	General	James Ah Koy	Independent	5,604		
Central	General	David Whippy	Independent	2,622		
Central	General	Trevor McNally	Independent	976		
Central	General	Invalid votes		11,518	–	
Central	Indo-Fijian	Abdul Lateef	Alliance Party	15,498		Elected
Central	Indo-Fijian	Madho Singh Tikaram	Federation Party	13,487		
Central	Indo-Fijian	C. P. Singh	Independent	7,939		Unseated
Central	Indo-Fijian	Shiu Narayan Kanhai	Independent	1,505		
Central	Indo-Fijian	M. Columbus	Independent	1,077		
Central	Indo-Fijian	M. Azam	Independent	987		
Central	Indo-Fijian	Invalid votes		1,584	–	
Northern and Eastern	Fijian	Kamisese Mara	Alliance Party	26,025		Re-elected
Northern and Eastern	Fijian	Nemani Waka	Independent	8,635		
Northern and Eastern	Fijian	Informal		885	–	
Northern and Eastern	General	Lindsay Verrier	Alliance Party	Unopposed		Elected
Northern and Eastern	Indo-Fijian	Vijay R. Singh	Alliance Party	26,634		Elected
Northern and Eastern	Indo-Fijian	Vijay Singh	Federation Party	8,068		
Northern and Eastern	Indo-Fijian	Invalid votes		808	–	
Western	Fijian	Joshua Toganivalu	Alliance Party	25,960		Elected
Western	Fijian	Penaia Rokovuni	Federation Party	23,171		
Western	Fijian	Isikeli Nadalo	National Democratic Party	4,242		
Western	Fijian	Invalid votes		2,085	–	
Western	General	Loloma Livingston	Alliance Party	23,768		Elected
Western	General	Peter Davis	Independent	22,677		
Western	General	Invalid votes		8,882	–	
Western	Indo-Fijian	K. S. Reddy	Alliance Party	28,200		Elected
Western	Indo-Fijian	Deo Narayan	Federation Party	25,509		
Western	Indo-Fijian	Invalid votes		1,729	–	
Source: Pacific Islands Monthly

== Aftermath ==
Following the elections, the two independents joined the Alliance Party. A new government was formed with Kamisese Mara as Leader of Government Business. The Executive Council consisted of six elected members and four civil servants.

1966 Executive Council
Position	Member
Leader of Government Business	Kamisese Mara
Natural Resources	Kamisese Mara
Attorney General	Justin Lewis
Acting Chief Secretary	Ian Thomson
Commerce, Industry and Tourism	Edward Cakobau
Communications and Works	Charles Stinson
Financial Secretary	Harry Richie
Secretary for Fijian Affairs and Local Government	Penaia Ganilau
Social Services	Vijay R. Singh
Undersecretary for Social Services	K. S. Reddy
Without portfolio	John Falvey

At the first meeting of the Legislative Council on 11 November, Ronald Kermode was elected Speaker unopposed, with James Madhavan elected Deputy Speaker.

Full ministerial government was introduced on 1 September 1967. On the same day, the Federation Party MLCs walked out of the Legislative Council. After they missed three meetings, the nine Indo-Fijian communal seats were declared vacant and a series of by-elections held in 1968.

1967 Cabinet
Position	Minister
Chief Minister	Kamisese Mara
Minister for Commerce, Industry and Labour	Edward Cakobau
Minister for Communications, Works and Tourism	Charles Stinson
Minister for Fijian Affairs and Local Government	Penaia Ganilau
Minister for Finance	Harry Richie
Minister for Natural Resources	Douglas Walkden-Brown
Minister without Portfolio	John Falvey
Minister for Social Services	Vijay R. Singh
Source: Pacific Islands Monthly

== See also ==
- List of members of the Parliament of Fiji (1966–1972)
