= 1968 Fijian by-elections =

- 31 August - 7 September 1968

All 9 Indo-Fijian seats on the Legislative Council

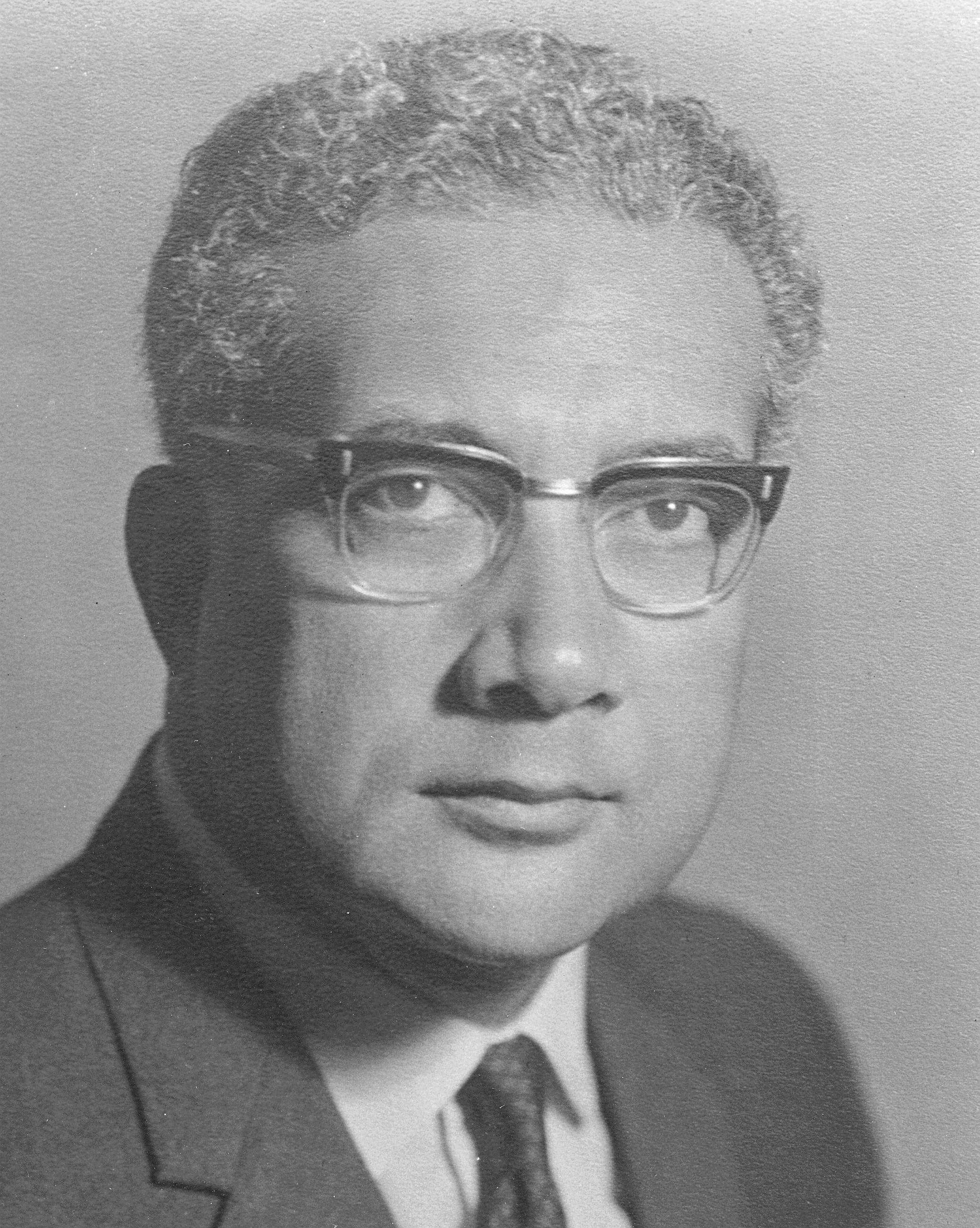
	First party	Second party
Leader	A. D. Patel	Kamisese Mara
Party	Federation Party	Alliance
Seats won	9	0
Popular vote	46,960	12,826
Percentage	78.55%	21.45%

By-elections for the nine Indo-Fijian seats in the Legislative Council were held in Fiji between 31 August and 7 September 1968. The seats had previously been held by the Federation Party, but their members had resigned in protest at the introduction of ministerial government and failure to reform the electoral system.

== Background ==
In the 1966 elections, the multiracial Alliance Party won 23 seats (all nine Fijian seats, all nine cross-voting seats, and five of the seven general seats) and the Indo-Fijian dominated Federation Party 9 (all of which were Indo-Fijian seats), with independents winning the remaining two. Following the elections, a ministerial system of government was introduced, with Kamisese Mara of the Alliance Party as Chief Minister. Federation Party leader A. D. Patel became Leader of the Opposition.

Under the previous membership system, Patel had held a portfolio. However, under the new system, the government was able to make unilateral decisions. When the Government made no effort to reform Fiji's electoral system, Patel moved a motion on 1 September 1967, calling for a new constitutional conference. When it became clear that the Government would use its majority to vote down the motion, the Federation members walked out of the Legislative Council.

After the nine Federation Party members missed three consecutive sittings of the Legislative Council, their seats were declared vacant and new elections called.

== Campaign ==
A total of 18 candidates contested the nine seats. The Alliance Party and the Federation Party putting forward a full slate of nine, with no independents or other parties running. In the 1966 elections the Alliance had only contested three of the nine seats.

All but one of the incumbent Federation Party MPs stood for the party again; the exception was M. T. Khan, who switched to the Alliance. He was replaced as the Federation Party candidate by Ujagar Singh, a teacher. Most of the Federation Party candidates were well-known and respected within the Indo-Fijian community. The Federation Party platform called for immediate independence (as a republic with an ethnic Fijian as president), a common roll electoral system, a bill of rights, the introduction of free education, free healthcare, a minimum wage, pensions and unemployment benefits, as well as nationalising key industries and providing subsidies for food.

In addition to Khan, the Alliance candidates consisted of three lawyers, three teachers, a businessman and a travel agent. None of them had run in the 1966 elections and there was little respect for most of them from much of the Indo-Fijian population. Patel accused the Alliance of being "white colonialist dominated" and party spokesmen referred to Alliance candidates stooges for foreign companies. The Alliance campaign included a continued move towards self-government, move devolved decision making and better roads and communications.

== Results ==
The Federation Party candidates won all nine seats, with an increased majority in every one, whilst the Alliance candidates lost their deposits in two seats. Across the nine seats, the Federation Party received 46,960 votes (78.5%) and the Alliance Party 12,826 (21.5%). Voter turnout was 81%, a decrease from the turnout in the constituencies in the 1966 elections.

Party	Votes	%	Seats
Federation Party	46,960	78.55	9
Alliance Party	12,826	21.45	0
Total	59,786	100.00	9
Valid votes	59,786	97.71	
Invalid/blank votes	1,399	2.29	
Total votes	61,185	100.00	
Registered voters/turnout	75,973	80.54	
Source: Anthony

=== By constituency ===
Constituency	Candidate	Party	Votes
North-East Vanua Levu	James Madhavan	Federation Party	5,870
North-East Vanua Levu	Albert Jayant	Alliance Party	1,075
North-East Viti Levu	C. A. Shah	Federation Party	4,441
North-East Viti Levu	M. T. Khan	Alliance Party	1,777
North Eastern	Ram Jati Singh	Federation Party	2,676
North Eastern	R. D. Mishra	Alliance Party	455
North-West Viti Levu	R. D. Patel	Federation Party	5,561
North-West Viti Levu	K. N. Govind	Alliance Party	3,223
South-Central Viti Levu	Ujagar Singh	Federation Party	4,878
South-Central Viti Levu	A. G. Prasad	Alliance Party	502
South-West Viti Levu	A. D. Patel	Federation Party	7,903
South-West Viti Levu	Manikam Pillai	Alliance Party	2,772
Suva	Irene Jai Narayan	Federation Party	5,808
Suva	P. K. Bhindi	Alliance Party	892
Tailevu–Rewa	K. C. Ramrakha	Federation Party	3,718
Tailevu–Rewa	M. Y. Khan	Alliance Party	396
West Viti Levu	Sidiq Koya	Federation Party	6,105
West Viti Levu	Suakat Ali Sahib	Alliance Party	1,734

== Aftermath ==
Although the victory proved the support for the Federation Party within the Info-Fijian community, it also exacerbated ethnic tensions. Following the elections, ethnic Fijians rioted (with 21 arrested and charged in one area) and mass meetings were held in several locations at which calls were made for Indo-Fijians to be deported.
