= Douglas Walkden-Brown =

Australian-Fijian politician (1921–2013)

Douglas Walkden-Brown MBE

Minister for Agriculture, Fisheries and Forests (Note: Formerly called the Minister for Natural Resources, formally renamed in June 1971.)
- In office 1 September 1967 – May 1975
- Prime Minister: Kamisese Mara
- Chief Minister: Kamisese Mara
- Preceded by: Kamisese Mara
- Succeeded by: Charles Walker

Member of the House of Representatives
- In office 29 April 1972 – 19 March 1977
- Preceded by: Position established
- Succeeded by: Charles Walker
- Constituency: General–National

Member of the Legislative Council
- In office 8 October 1966 – 15 April 1972
- Preceded by: Position established
- Succeeded by: Position abolished
- Constituency: General–Central

Parliamentary Secretary for Natural Resources
- In office 1966–1967 Serving with Jonati Mavoa
- Minister: Kamisese Mara
- Preceded by: Position established

Personal details
- Born: 18 October 1921 Parkes, New South Wales, Australia
- Died: 26 October 2013 (aged 92) Armidale, New South Wales, Australia
- Party: Alliance
- Spouse: Barbara Curtis (m. 1949)
- Education: Hawkesbury Agricultural College
- Occupation: Soldier; Missionary; Politician

Military service
- Allegiance: Australia
- Branch/service: Royal Australian Air Force
- Years of service: 1942–1945
- Rank: Sergeant
- Battles/wars: World War II; Pacific War

Douglas Walkden-Brown MBE (18 October 1921 – 26 October 2013) was an Australian Fijian missionary, farmer, educator, politician and diplomat. He was a member of the House of Representatives from 1966 to 1977 and served as Minister for Natural Resources and Minister for Agriculture, Fisheries and Forests between 1967 and 1975, later becoming Fijian Consul in Sydney.

== Biography ==
Brown was born in Parkes, New South Wales, Australia in 1921 to a Methodist minister. He studied at Hawkesbury Agricultural College, after which he joined the Royal Australian Air Force (RAAF) during World War II. In 1947 he moved to Fiji to work as a Methodist missionary, and the following year was appointed headteacher of Navuso Agricultural School. In 1960 he retired, and bought his own farm near Nausori where he became a dairy and poulty farmer. He was awarded an MBE in the 1961 Birthday Honours for services to agriculture in Fiji. He also became involved in rugby administration, serving as President of the Rewa Rugby Union and the Fiji School Rugby Union, as well as managing the Fiji national team that toured England, France and Wales in 1964.

In 1963 he contested the elections to the Legislative Council, losing to John Kearsley in the European Southern constituency by 13 votes. Prior to the 1966 elections he joined the Alliance Party and was elected from the Central General cross-voting constituency. Following the elections, he was appointed Parliamentary Secretary to the Member for Natural Resources, Kamisese Mara. The following year he took over from Mara as Member, and later in the year became Minister for Natural Resources when full ministerial government was introduced. When Fiji became independent in 1970, he took Fijian citizenship. In 1971 his ministerial title changed to Minister for Agriculture, Fisheries and Forests.

In the 1972 elections he was re-elected in the Eastern General national constituency, after which he retained his ministerial post. He retired from politics due to ill-health, losing his seat in the March 1977 elections. However, in 1981 he was appointed the Fijian Consul General in Sydney, a role he held until 1984.

He died in October 2013 aged 92.
