= M. T. Khan =

Fijian politician (died 1982)

Minister for Commerce, Industries and Co-operatives
- In office 1972–1976
- Preceded by: Edward Cakobau

Member of the House of Representatives
- In office 1972–1977
- Preceded by: Vijay R. Singh
- Succeeded by: C. A. Shah
- Constituency: Indo-Fijian National North-Eastern

Member of the Senate
- In office 1970–1972

Member of the Legislative Council
- In office 1966–1968
- Succeeded by: Ujagar Singh
- Constituency: South-Central Viti Levu

Personal details
- Died: May 1982 Lautoka, Fiji
- Party: Federation Party (until 1968); Alliance Party (after 1968)
- Profession: Lawyer

Mohammed Taiyab Khan (died May 1982) was an Indo-Fijian politician and lawyer. Between 1966 and 1977 he served as a member of the Legislative Council, Senate and House of Representatives. He was also Minister for Commerce, Industries and Co-operatives from 1972 to 1976.

== Biography ==
A prominent lawyer in the Tavua area, Khan was the Federation Party candidate for the South-Central Viti Levu Indo-Fijian communal constituency in the 1966 elections and was elected to the Legislative Council. In 1968 all Federation Party members resigned in protest at the government. However, Khan switched allegiances to the Alliance Party and ran unsuccessfully in the North-East Viti Levu constituency in the subsequent by-elections.

When Fiji became independent in 1970, an appointed Senate was established, with Khan appointed as one of the nominees of Prime Minister Kamisese Mara. He remained in the Senate until the 1972 elections, when he was elected to the House of Representatives from the Indo-Fijian North-Eastern national constituency. Following the elections, he was appointed Minister for Commerce, Industries and Co-operatives by Mara. However, in May 1976 he was charged with corruption and resigned from the cabinet. Although he was later cleared, he was not invited to return to the cabinet, and was later expelled from the Alliance after abstaining from a key vote.

He lost his seat in the March 1977 elections and later joined the National Federation Party (NFP), a successor to the Federation Party. He died in Lautoka in May 1982 from a heart attack, shortly before the general elections in which he was an NFP candidate.
