= Lindsay Verrier =

English-Fijian politician (1907–1981)

Member of the House of Representatives
- In office 1966–1972
- Constituency: Northern and Eastern General

Personal details
- Born: 1907 United Kingdom
- Died: 20 April 1981 (aged 73) Suva, Fiji
- Party: Alliance, Liberal

Dr Walter Lindsay Isaac Verrier (1907 – 20 April 1981) was an English-born physician and politician in Fiji.

== Biography ==
Born Walter Lindsay Isaac in England, Verrier qualified as a doctor before emigrating to Fiji in 1938 where he worked as a medical officer in Suva, Levuka and Nadroga. In 1940 he was transferred to the Gilbert Islands, but returned to Fiji following the Japanese invasion. Upon his return he was asked to compile a national register for administering compulsory military service, leading to a lifelong interest in compiling Fijian family histories in the Bua and Macuata districts. He changed his surname to Verrier in the 1940s and became responsible for compiling medical statistics. He spent several months at the Walter and Eliza Hall Institute of Medical Research in Melbourne in 1947–48, and was later appointed a medical officer for Suva City Council.

After funding the medical studies of future Prime Minister Kamisese Mara in the 1950s, he was a founder member of Mara's Alliance Party, serving as its first secretary-general. In the 1966 general elections he was returned unopposed from the Northern and Eastern general electors cross-voting constituency. With the Alliance winning and Mara becoming Leader of Government Business, Verrier was appointed Secretary to the Leader of Government Business. However, following an argument with Mara he left the Alliance in 1968 and established the Liberal Party.

When Fiji became independent in 1970, he was the second person awarded Fijian citizenship. He contested the 1972 elections with the support of the National Federation Party, but failed to be elected. He reconciled with Mara in 1980 when dying from cancer. After a short spell working at the Royal Prince Alfred Hospital in Sydney, he died at Suva's Home of Compassion in April 1981 at the age of 73.
