= C. A. Shah =

Fijian politician (died 1983)

Chirag Ali Shah

Member of the House of Representatives
- In office 1977
- Preceded by: M. T. Khan
- Succeeded by: Ishwari Prasad Bajpai
- Constituency: North-Eastern Indo-Fijian National
- In office 1972–1977
- Succeeded by: Ram Sami Goundar
- Constituency: Tavua–Vaileka Indo-Fijian Communal
- In office 1966–1972
- Constituency: North-East Viti Levu Indo-Fijian

Nominated Member of the Legislative Council
- In office 1963–1966

Personal details
- Born: 1920 or 1921
- Died: December 1983 (aged 62) Wollongong, Australia
- Party: Federation Party, NFP
- Profession: Farmer

Chirag Ali Shah (died December 1983) was an Indo-Fijian farmer and politician. He was a member of the Legislative Council and House of Representatives from 1963 to 1977.

== Biography ==
A cane farmer in Ra Province, Shah joined the Legislative Council in 1963 when he was one of the two Indo-Fijian members appointed to the legislature by the Governor. Previously, nominated members had been largely pro-government but Shah aligned himself with the opposition. This group, known as the Citizens Federation, and including farmers union representatives A. D. Patel, Sidiq Koya, and James Madhavan, later formed the first political party in Fiji, the Federation Party.

Shah's inclusion in the new political party provided diversity to the hierarchy of the party which was dominated by lawyers, businessmen and academics. He took part in the 1965 Constitutional Conference in London with his other colleagues in the Federation Party. In the 1966 elections he won the North-East Viti Levu seat for the Federation Party in a three-way contest with 58% of the vote. The Indo-Fijian members all resigned two years later to protest government policies, with Shah re-elected in the subsequent 1968 by-election.

He was re-elected again in the 1972 elections in the Tavua–Vaileka Indo-Fijian communal constituency, and from the North-Eastern national constituency in the March 1977 elections. However, he lost his seat in the September 1977 elections.

He died in Wollongong in Australia in December 1983, having travelled to Australia for medical treatment.
