= William Yee =

Fijian engineer and politician

Member of the Legislative Council for Suva General
- In office 1966–1972

Member of the House of Representatives for Suva/Central General
- In office 1972–1982
- Succeeded by: James Ah Koy

Personal details
- Born: 18 July 1928 (age 98) Zhongshan, China
- Party: Alliance Party
- Profession: Civil engineer

Hon Wing William Yee (born 18 July 1928) was a Fijian engineer and politician. He was the first Chinese Fijian to be elected to the Legislative Council.

== Biography ==
Yee was born in Zhongshan in China, before moving to Fiji as a child. He attended the Marist Brothers High School in Suva and St Bede's College in Canterbury. He then studied engineering at the University of Auckland, and was the first Fijian Chinese to earn a degree in the subject.

=== Political career ===
The 1966 general elections were the first in which Chinese Fijians were able to vote. Yee was an Alliance Party candidate in the three-seat General constituency of Suva, and was elected by a margin of 90 votes. In the 1972 elections he was re-elected in the Suva/Central General constituency of the House of Representatives. He was re-elected again in March 1977 and September 1977, by which time the constituency had been renamed Suva/Central.

=== Other roles ===
In 1975 Yee became chairman of the new Chinese Education Society and worked as school manager of the Yat Sen School. He remained chairman until 1983, and held the post again between 1987 and 1996.
