= Charles Walker (Fijian politician) =

Fijian politician (1928–2021)

The Honourable Charles Walker
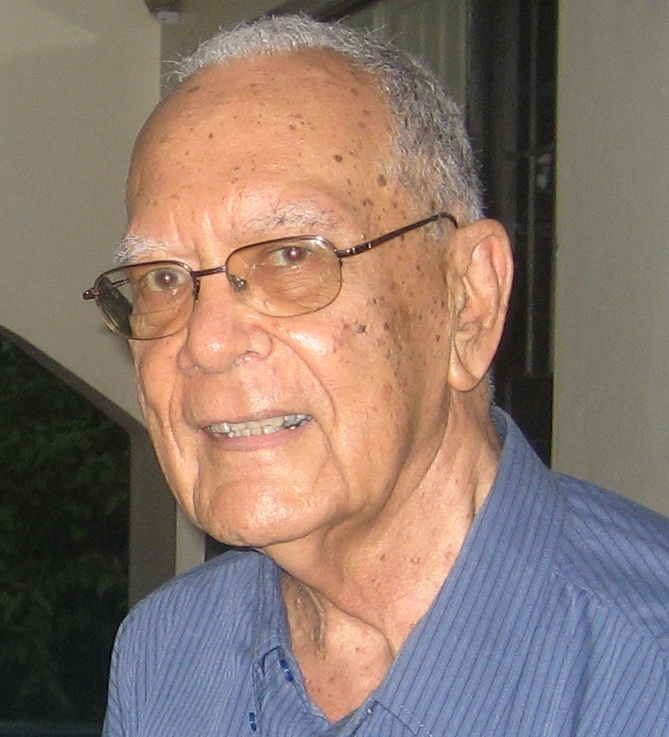

Ambassador to the Empire of Japan, Republic of South Korea & The People's Republic of China
- In office 16 January 1988 – 29 May 1993
- Preceded by: Tui Cavuilati
- Succeeded by: Robin Yarrow

Minister of Information
- In office 1987–1988

Minister of Finance
- In office 1979–1983
- Preceded by: Charles Alexander Stinson
- Succeeded by: Mosese Qionibaravi

Minister of Agriculture and Fisheries
- In office 1977–1979
- Preceded by: Douglas Walkden-Brown
- Succeeded by: Jonati Mavoa

Member of the House of Representatives
- In office 1987
- Preceded by: Ted Beddoes
- Constituency: Vanua Levu–Lau–Rotuma General National
- In office 1977–1987
- Preceded by: Douglas Walkden-Brown
- Succeeded by: James Ah Koy
- Constituency: Eastern General National

Personal details
- Born: 12 June 1928 Sawana Village, Lomaloma District, Vanua Balavu Island, Lau Province, Fiji
- Died: 11 March 2021 (aged 92) Suva, Fiji
- Party: Alliance

Charles Walker (12 June 1928 – 11 March 2021) was a Fijian civil servant and Alliance Party politician and diplomat.

== Early life ==
Walker was born in the village of Sawana in the Lomaloma district on Vanua Balavu island in the Lau Archipelago. He was registered under Luseane Wainiqolo, his maternal grandmother, in the rolls of the Vola ni Kawa Bula (Native Land Register), the Fijian register of births and the only legal way to claim associated communal rights to native land, fishing rights (qoliqoli) and claim to hereditary chiefly titles. His father Ernest Fearon Walker was a Scottish settler and worked for the Hedstrom and Hennings families managing a local trade store. Walker was fortunate to have the choice and ability to move between two very different worlds: the traditional Fijian/Tongan way of life in the village and as the son of a European settler in the Western world of rapidly modernising Suva City.

Walker was educated at the Levuka Public School, then completed his secondary education at the Marist Brothers High School in Suva. After attaining his Senior Cambridge, he was accepted into the University of Otago at Cantebury in New Zealand, receiving a BSc in Agricultural Science in 1948. He later completed a MSc in agriculture at the University of Trinidad & Tobago.

== Career ==
Walker began his career in the Colonial Civil Service in the Colonial Department of Agriculture in the late 1940s as a Senior Agricultural Officer. By the time he married in 1958 he had progressed to the post of Director Agriculture and remained in that post until 1966, when responsible internal self-government was introduced, he became Deputy Secretary of the newly formed Ministry of Agriculture. He became Permanent Secretary for Agriculture in 1969 and after Independence came in 1970, he served in various portfolios including Finance and Foreign Affairs until he became Permanent Secretary to the Public Service Commission, effectively the first local to head the civil service.

Walker was invited by his paramount chief and leader of the Alliance Party Ratu Sir Kamisese Mara to resign from the Civil Service and stand for the Eastern General National seat in 1977, replacing Douglas Walkden-Brown, which he won, holding until the military coup-d'etat of 1987 after the Alliance defeat to the Labour/NFP Coalition. He served invariably as Minister of Agriculture, and then Finance and was Acting Prime Minister on a couple of occasions in the Alliance Administration. He resigned as Minister of Finance due differences with the Prime Minister over how to handle an industrial dispute and served out the rest of his parliamentary term as a backbencher.

After the 1987 coup, he served for a short stint as Interim Minister for Information for the military junta before being appointed Fiji's Ambassador to the Empire of Japan in late 1988.

After returning to Fiji in 1993, he was appointed Chairman of the Public Service Commission, Chairman of the Police Services Commission, a member of the Higher Salaries Commission as well as Chairman of the Civil Aviation Authority of Fiji.

Walker resigned from all those positions after a strong disagreement with the SVT government led by Major General Sitiveni Rabuka, coup-maker cum elected Prime Minister.

Shortly afterwards, he accepted the Chairmanship of Fiji Pine Limited and Directorship of its subsidiary Tropik Woods Limited. He also accepted board positions two private companies with BOC Gases and Golden Manufacturing Ltd.

After the failed civilian overthrow of George Speight in 2000, he tendered his resignations for Fiji Pine and Tropik Wood Limited due to perceived conflicts with the new interim military administration's handling of these government subsidiaries.

After Parliamentary Democracy was restored in 2001, he accepted appointment as Chair of the Sugar Industry Restructuring Committee by the leader of the SDL Government Prime Minister Laisenia Qarase. When the Committee concluded its work in 2004, he accepted an appointment as Consultant/Advisor to Government on the Sugar Industry Restructure until he was removed by the military regime of Frank Bainimarama after the military overthrow of December 2006.

Walker then retired to his family home in Suva.

== Personal life and family ties ==
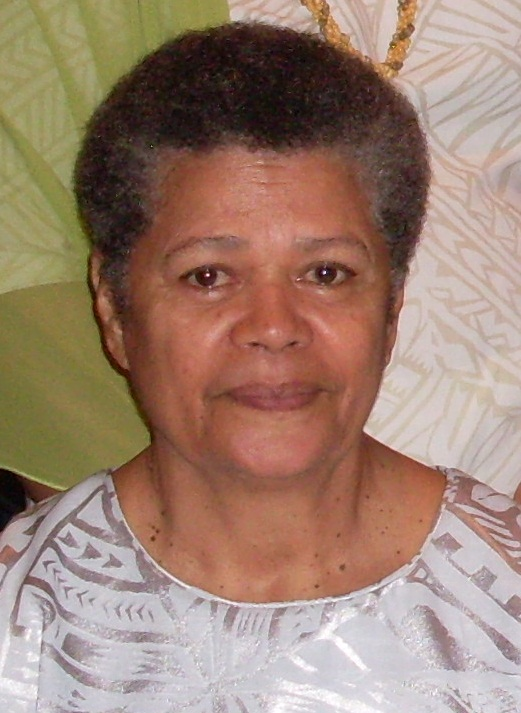
Adi Alisi Davila Walker née Uluiviti

Walker was the youngest of the three children of Ernest Fearon Walker of Fife in Scotland and Vilimaina Saulo Fotofili, of the Yavusa Tonga, Sawana in the district of Lomaloma on Vanua Balavu island in the Lau Group.

Through his father he traced descent from the earliest European settlers including his namesake and grandfather Charles who settled in Fiji via Tonga and Canada and his uncle Leslie who was the colony's first Post Master General. The Walkers trace kinship to the Dukes of Fife. Through Walker's paternal great-grandmother Martha Helen Walker née Leslie, they also traced descent from the Earls of Leven. His paternal granduncle Wilfrid was an explorer and author of Wanderings Among South Sea Savages: And in Borneo and the Philippines, Wilfrid dedicated the book to his brother Charles, Walker's grandfather/namesake and a signed copy remains with his descendants.

Through his mother he claimed descent from Wainiqolo, the ambitious Tongan chief and loyal lieutenant of Ma'afu, who conquered much of Eastern and Northern Fiji before being reined in by Fiji's cession as a crown colony to the United Kingdom in 1874.

Walker was married to Adi Alisi Davila Walker née Uluiviti (born 12 August 1937), a lady of rank from the village of Natauloa on the island of Nairai, Lomaiviti Province. She is a member of the Methodist Church of Fiji and Rotuma, an elder and lay preacher in Fiji and regionally through participation in International Christian Groups like Aglow International and ICEJ. Her elder sister Adi Losalini Raravuya Dovi was one of three pioneer lady Members of the Legislative Council (MLC), although she was not elected but nominated as were the majority of iTaukei MLCs at the time (Irene Jai Narayan and Loma Livingstone were elected in the same – 1966 session – as Indian and European MLCs respectively). Her nephew Ratu Joni Madraiwiwi, a former Vice-President of Fiji, is a paramount chief, prominent lawyer and former Judge of Fiji's High Court.

They had three children Martha Jean Walker (1959–2008), Lilian Davila Walker (born 1961) and Ernest Fearon Walker (born 1972). Charles Walker He died in Suva on 11 March 2021, at the age of 92.
