= K. N. Govind =

Fijian Indian politician and judge (died 2020)

The Honourable Kishore Nand Govind OBE

Member of House of Representatives (Fiji) North Central Indian National Constituency
- In office 1972–1977
- Succeeded by: Surendra Prasad

Mayor of Ba Town
- In office 1969–1975

Personal details
- Born: Nausori, Fiji
- Died: 9 August 2020 Sydney, Australia
- Party: Alliance Party
- Profession: Lawyer, judge

Kishore Nand Govind, OBE was a former Fiji Indian politician who was a judge of the High Court of Fiji. After retiring from politics, he was made a judge of the Supreme Court (pre 1987 coup) of Fiji and during the tumultuous times between the coups of May and September 1987 he continued to deliver verdicts which maintained the independence of the judiciary. He was forced to leave Fiji in late 1987 but returned in 2001 to be reappointed a judge of the High Court.

== Politician ==
In 1968, when by-elections were held to fill vacancies created by the boycott of the Legislature by members of the National Federation Party (NFP) from the Legislative Council, he contested the Ba Indian Communal Constituency for the Alliance Party against R. D. Patel of the NFP. Although he lost by a greater margin than his Alliance predecessor in the last two elections (James Shankar Singh), the election established him as a well known Ba identity and in 1969 he was elected the Mayor of Ba town. He was mayor for two terms.

In the 1972 general election, he contested the North Central Indian National Seat (located in Ba) for the House of Representatives, and surprised his detractors by winning with a comfortable margin in a constituency with a large Indian population where the Indian dominated NFP was expected to do well. In Parliament he spoke out on issues affecting his constituents. He was the first Indian member of the House to make use of the privilege to speak in Hindi. (There was no interpreter and he translated his own speech into English). In 1975 when the leader of the Fijian Nationalist Party, Sakeasi Butadroka, moved a motion calling for the expulsion of the Indian community from Fiji, Govind first seconded the motion (so that debate could take place) then moved an amendment which recognised the contribution of the Indian community towards the development of Fiji.

He lost his seat in Parliament in the March 1977 elections and retired from politics.

== Judge of Supreme Court of Fiji ==
In the early 1980s he was appointed a judge of the Supreme Court of Fiji and soon distinguished himself by handing out judgements which showed his understanding of the social and cultural background of the defendants. After the coup of May 1987, he fled Fiji because of harassment by the military government of Sitiveni Rabuka. Before he fled Fiji he continued to deliver judgements that were seen as fair and impartial and often critical of the government. When the second coup of 1987 took place on 25 September Govind, with another outspoken expatriate judge was imprisoned on what were later proven to be trumped up charges. He fled Fiji because he was forewarned that he was to be jailed for a longer period.

== In Australia ==
To escape political persecution, he left Fiji for Australia in late 1987. He practised law in Sydney for a while before joining the New South Wales Office of the Director of Public Prosecutions. He was a junior in the ranks of the organisation. With a new constitution and fairer political climate in Fiji, he resigned his position on 31 January 2001 and returned to Fiji.

== Judge of High Court of Fiji ==
Govind was re-appointed as a judge of the High Court of the Republic of Fiji and continued his unique style of delivering judgements.

In November 2002 Justice Govind said that there is nothing revolutionary in offering discounts in sentencing to criminals who plead guilty. Justice Kishore Govind made headlines when he told lawyers that there could be up to 25 percent discount in sentencing if their clients pleaded guilty. He said guilty pleas have been attracting lesser sentences already but he thought he would spell it out and make it generally known. Justice Govind said that there are a number of reasons why he thought the discounting was a good move.

“It saves a complainant or a victim in cases like violence or rape the trauma of going to trial to giving evidence. Secondly, it saves the state a lot of expense, calling witnesses, wastage of court time. So there are a lot of pluses attendant upon a plea of guilty and I think any person who pleads guilty should be rewarded for it."

His rulings show liberal ideas of tackling drug problems. He criticised a magistrate for not granting a defendant, charged with possessing 59 grams of marijuana, bail and discharged on the condition that he not reoffend within 12 months because he was a single parent and looking after his six children, all of whom were in school. He said that "While many know the evil and social destruction the marijuana habits can do, the circumstances of this case invites the leniency of the court". Justice Govind gave him a last chance saying he must rehabilitate himself and educate others not to take marijuana. "Go back and tell others how dangerous marijuana was and discourage them from smoking." He said that smoking marijuana was not a way to relieve pressure, and also told him that he was not showing a good example to his children.

In another case he also discharged a man found in possession of 50 grams of marijuana. He said that he was still young and had a long life ahead of him and his employer would not see the marijuana but a conviction next to his name. He said that a conviction was disproportionate to his mitigation, where he said that he was living with his elderly parents and was supporting them as well.

"So I have wiped your slate clean because your employer will look at the convictions of drugs and not see the amount at all. I have given you a chance but don't abuse it and don't come back here. Go and educate your colleagues and friends of the evils of these drugs because it can destroy the whole country."

== Supporter of football ==
Govind was a passionate supporter of the Ba football team. He was a member of the executive of the Ba Football Association and his legacy to football in Ba is the naming of the home ground of the team after him i.e. Govind Park.

== Later life ==
He migrated to Australia and died in Sydney on 9 August 2020.
