= C. P. Singh =

Fijian politician (died 1983)

Chandra Pal Singh

Nominated Member of the Legislative Council
- In office 1963–1966

Personal details
- Born: Nausori, Fiji
- Died: 5 June 1983 (aged 69)

Chandra Pal Tara Singh Bains JP (died 5 June 1983) was an Indo-Fijian politician. He served in the Legislative Council as a nominated member from 1963 to 1966.

== Biography ==
Born in Nausori, Singh was educated at Columbus School in Suva. He began working at Suva Motors in 1940, later becoming a dairy farmer and owning a bus company and sawmill. He was also a soccer administrator and established Navua FC.

Following the 1963 elections he was appointed to the Legislative Council as a nominated member. In 1964 he was appointed to the board of the Fiji Broadcasting Corporation. In 1965 he was part of the Fijian constitutional conference in London. He contested the Indo-Fijian Central cross-voting seat in 1966 general elections as an independent, but finished third behind the candidates of the Alliance Party and Federation Party.

He died in Suva in June 1983 at the age of 69.
