= 1972 Fijian general election =

- 15–29 April 1972

All 52 seats in the House of Representatives 26 seats needed for a majority
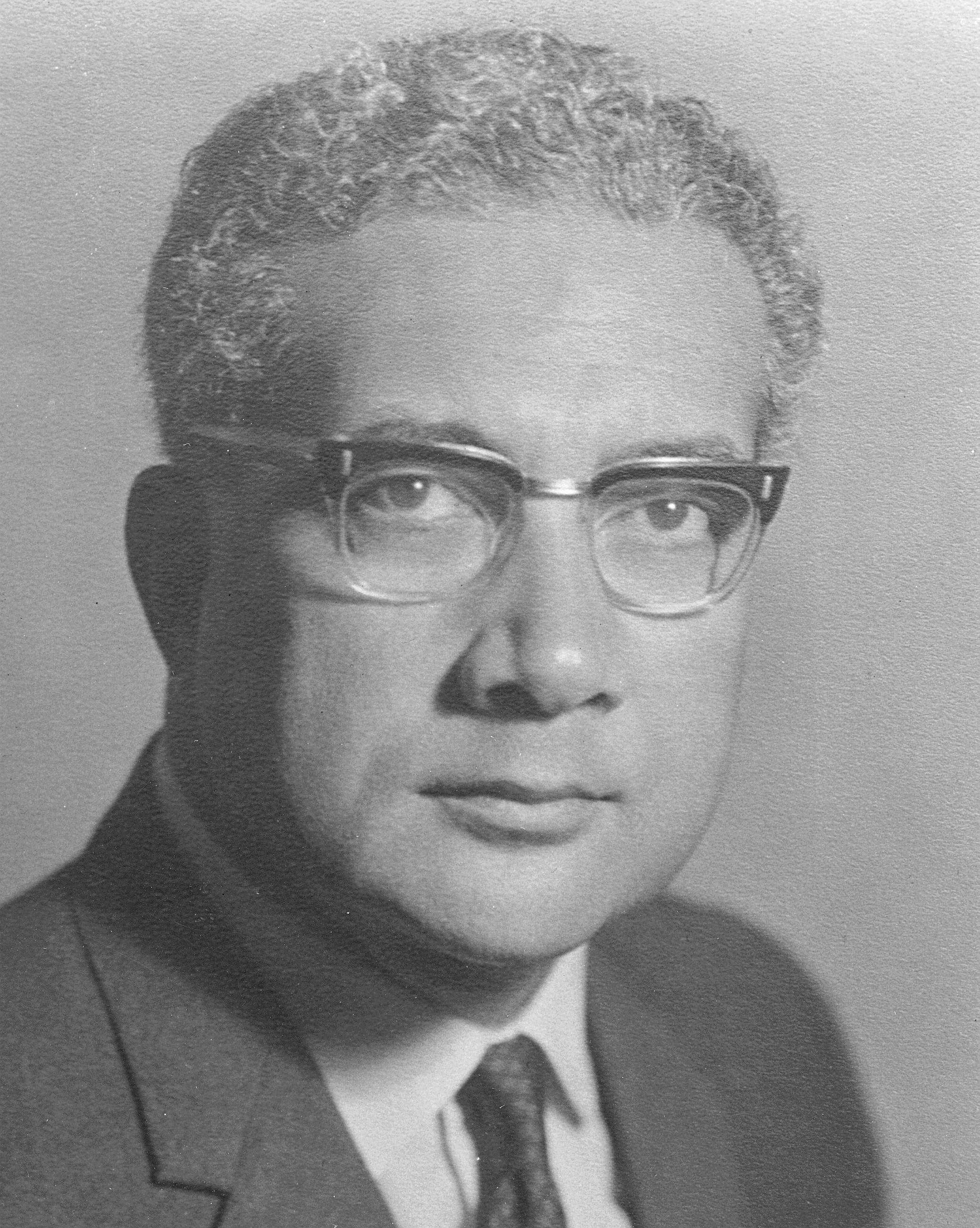
	First party	Second party
		NFP
Leader	Kamisese Mara	Sidiq Koya
Party	Alliance	NFP
Last election	23 seats	9 seats
Seats won	33	19
Seat change	▲10	▲10
Popular vote	388,550	241,866
Percentage	57.52%	35.81%
Swing	▲5.58pp	▲6.76pp
Prime Minister before election
Kamisese Mara
Alliance
Subsequent Prime Minister
Kamisese Mara
Alliance

General elections were held in Fiji between 15 and 29 April 1972, the first since independence from the United Kingdom in 1970. They were characterised by the lack of rancour between racial groups, typical of the 1966 general election and the 1968 by-elections.

The result was a landslide for the Alliance Party of the Prime Minister, Kamisese Mara, which won 33 of the 52 seats, and surprised many observers by capturing almost 25 percent of the Indo-Fijian vote. The Indo-Fijian-dominated National Federation Party led by Sidiq Koya won the remaining 19 seats. The election re-affirmed the political allegiances of the past, with the Alliance Party winning all the Fijian Communal seats with 82% of the vote, as well as all the General Communal seats. The National Federation Party (NFP) won all the Indian Communal sets with 73% of the vote. Voter turnout was 85.2% in the communal seats.

== Electoral system ==
The 52-member House of Representatives consisted of 27 members elected from communal constituencies (12 Fijian, 12 Indo-Fijian and three general electors) and 25 members elected from national constituencies (10 Fijian, 10 Indo-Fijian and five general electors), all elected by first-past-the-post voting.

Voters could cast up to four votes; one in their own communal constituency, and three in their national constituency, in which they voted for a Fijian, Indo-Fijian and general elector candidate.

== Results ==
Graph of the party split among 52 seats.
Party	Votes	%	Seats	+/–
Alliance Party	388,550	57.52	33	+10
National Federation Party	241,866	35.81	19	+10
Fijian Independent Party	1,535	0.23	0	New
Independents	43,521	6.44	0	–2
Total	675,472	100.00	52	+16
Valid votes	675,472	97.94		
Invalid/blank votes	14,201	2.06		
Total ballots cast	169,126	–		
Registered voters/turnout	205,617	82.25		
Source: Nohlen et al.

== Aftermath ==
Following the elections, R. D. Patel of the National Federation Party became Speaker.

Prime Minister Mara carried out a cabinet reshuffle, appointing a new cabinet with 14 ministers, an increase from 12 in the previous government. He appointed two members to the Senate – John Falvey and Penaia Ganilau – to allow them to join the cabinet.

Position	Minister
Prime Minister	Kamisese Mara
Deputy Prime Minister	Edward Cakobau
Minister for Agriculture, Fisheries and Forests	Douglas Walkden-Brown
Attorney General	John Falvey
Minister for Commerce, Industries and Co-operatives	M. T. Khan
Minister for Communications, Works and Tourism	Penaia Ganilau
Minister for Education, Youth and Sport	Jone Naisara
Minister for Fijian Affairs	Willian Toganivalu
Minister for Finance	Charles Stinson
Minister for Health	James Shankar Singh
Minister for Labour	Jonati Mavoa
Minister for Lands, Mines and Mineral Resources	Josua Toganivalu
Minister of Urban Development, Housing and Social Welfare	Vijay R. Singh
Minister without Portfolio	George Cakobau
Source: Pacific Islands Monthly

== See also ==
- List of members of the Parliament of Fiji (1972–1977)
