= Narsi Raniga =

Member of House of Representatives (Fiji) South Central National Constituency
- In office 1987–1987
- Preceded by: Ramanlal Kapadia

Personal details
- Born: 1942 Ba, Fiji
- Died: 24 July 2017 (aged 74–75) Fiji
- Party: Alliance Party
- Spouse: Pushpa Raniga
- Profession: Civil Servant

Narsi Raniga (born 1942) is a Fiji Indian who has held senior civil service posts in Fiji and has also been a member of the House of Representatives of Fiji.

He was born in Ba and completed the Bachelor of Arts from the University of Queensland. After a brief period as a teacher, he did postgraduate courses at the University of Auckland and Cambridge University. On his return to Fiji, he joined the civil service. He worked as Commissioner of the Western Division, secretary for Foreign Affairs, High Commissioner to India, and permanent secretary to the Public Service Commission.

In 1987 he resigned from the civil service to contest the South Central National Constituency for the Alliance Party. He won the seat with a comfortable margin, but his party lost the election and he sat on the opposition bench for a month when the military coup of 1987 prematurely ended his political career.
