= Kadavu =

Kadavu may refer to:

- Kadavu Island, the fourth largest island in Fiji
- Kadavu Group, an archipelago in Fiji including Kadavu Island
- Kadavu Province, a province of Fiji including Kadavu Group
- Kadavu Airport or Vunisea Airport, an airport on Kadavu Island
- Kadavu (Fijian Communal Constituency, Fiji), a former electoral division of Fiji
- Kadavu (film) (English: The Ferry), a 1991 Indian Malayalam film
