= Citizens Federation =

- President: Tupou Draunidalo
- Founded: 1959-1963
- Headquarters: 124 Princes Road, Tamavua, Samabula
- Ideology: Social democracy
- Political position: Centre-left

The Citizens Federation was the political expression of a predominantly Indo-Fijian trade union movement, and was a forerunner of the present day National Federation Party.

A dispute between cane farmers and the Colonial Sugar Refining Company (CSR) in 1960 regarding a new cane contract led to the formation of the Federation of Cane Growers under the leadership of Dr A. D. Patel in May 1959. The Federation soon split, however: on 24 July 1960, Ayodhya Prasad of Kisan Sangh and Vijay R. Singh of Labasa Kisan Sangh broke away and signed an agreement with CSR for the purchase of the 1960 crop. They were joined by B. D. Lakshman. Singh and Lakshman accused Patel of dividing the Indian population and leading them further into debt. Intercommunal tensions also rose, with some Fijians, such as the Lauan Chief and Legislative Council member Ratu Kamisese Mara, called for Patel to be deported.

The Government appointed a commission of inquiry, headed by Sir Malcolm Trustram Eve, into the sugar industry. The Federation Committee was represented by A.D. Patel, assisted by Sidiq Koya. The findings of the commission were largely unfavourable to Patel's demands.

The Federation of Cane Growers contested the 1963 Legislative Council election under the banner of Citizens Federation. It was not organized as a formal political party but sought to promote economic, cultural and political progress and stability in a united Fiji. All three Citizen’s Federation candidates were elected to the Legislative Council. In the Western Constituency, A.D. Patel defeated Deo Sharma, president of the Kisan Sangh by 6244 votes to 3346, in the North Viti Levu Constituency, Sidiq Koya defeated James Shankar Singh by 3,998 votes to 3,480, and in the Northern Constituency James Madhavan defeated Harish Chandra Kohli by 2,753 votes to 2,175. There was no Citizens Federation candidate in the Southern Constituency, won by Andrew Deoki.

The success of the Citizens Federation in the 1963 elections, and the impending constitutional convention, prompted Patel to transform the Citizens Federation into a fully fledged political party. The Federation Party was duly founded on 21 June 1964, with A.D. Patel as President and Sidiq Koya as Vice-president.
