= Ba District, Fiji =

Coordinates: 17.5333°S 177.6830°E

Ba बा (Fiji Hindi)
- Tikina (District)
- Interactive map of Ba
- Country: Fiji
- Province: Ba

Population (2017)
  - Total: 39,372

Ba (Fijian pronunciation: [ᵐba]) is a district situated on the north western part of the island of Viti Levu in Fiji. The name Ba is also used for a province, a tikina (a native Fijian administrative region comprising several villages), a town and a river. Ba district comprises the areas surrounding Ba Town and includes the Fijian administrative tikinas of Ba and Magodro. Ba district is in the Western Division. Ba is a sugar cane growing district and sugar cane farming and employment in the Ba Sugar Mill are the main areas of employment. The Sugar Mill began crushing since 1886 by a New Zealand Sugar Company. (1).80 percent of the residents of Ba District are of Indian origin. The Ba District soccer team is the most successful soccer team in Fiji.

Some prominent people who originated from Ba are Parmanand Singh, Sidiq Koya, R. D. Patel, Narsi Raniga, Vinod Patel, Vijay R. Singh, James Shankar Singh, Parveen Bala, Davendra Singh, Anirudh Singh and Anand Singh.

== See also ==
- Local government of Fiji
- Ba F.C.
- Govind Park
- Ba humbugi
