= Loloma Livingston =

Fijian politician (1920-2010)

Member of the Legislative Council
- In office 1966–1972
- Succeeded by: Edmund March
- Constituency: Western (General Electors)

Personal details
- Born: 1920
- Died: 23 July 2010 Queensland, Australia
- Party: Alliance Party
- Profession: Artist

Loloma Irene Livingston (1920 – 23 July 2010) was a Fijian artist and politician. Alongside Irene Jai Narayan and Losalini Raravuya Dovi, she was one of the first female members of the Legislative Council.

== Political career ==
A fourth-generation European Fijian, Livingston trained as a nurse. She contested the Western General seat in the 1966 elections as the Alliance Party candidate, and was elected with a majority of over 1,000.

Livingston was a motoring enthusiast and was a member of the North West Car Club. She was also an advocate of adult education, and taught a series of English classes.

She died in Queensland, Australia in July 2010.
