= K. S. Reddy =

Fijian politician (1916–2006)

Krishna S. Reddy

Member of Legislative Council of Fiji Indian nominated member
- In office 1953–1956

Western Indian cross-voting constituency
- In office 1966–1972

Member of the House of Representatives South East Indian National Constituency
- In office 1972 – April 1977
- In office September 1977 – 1982

Personal details
- Born: 24 August 1916 Nadi, Fiji
- Died: 12 July 2006 (aged 89) Australia
- Party: The Alliance Party
- Profession: Teacher, Unionist

Krishna Subba Reddy (24 August 1916 – 12 July 2006) was a Fiji Indian school teacher, leader of a farmers' union and both a nominated and elected member of the Legislative Council. Although he started his political career as an ally of A. D. Patel (founder of the National Federation Party), disputes over the leadership style of A. D. Patel led to a split within the farmers' union that they both led and later they became members of opposing political parties. After independence, he was elected to the House of Representatives as an Alliance member and also served as an assistant minister.

== Early life ==
Reddy was born in Nadi, Fiji on 24 August 1916. His father Krishna Reddy was an active member of the Sangam and the Maha Sangh. He was an early beneficiary of the Sangam's attempts to improve education amongst the South Indians in Fiji and performed well in his early education. He started school rather late, around the age 12 or 13. He was left at a relative's place in Lautoka and attended the Catholic primary school and finished 8 years of formal education. When the Shri Vivekananda High School was established on 9 March 1949, K. S. Reddy was appointed its first Principal.

== Union leader ==
The Maha Sangh (farmers' union) was established in 1941, K. S. Reddy's father became its first Secretary, but on his death the position was passed onto his son, K. S. Reddy. In 1953, the Governor appointed him to one of the two seats reserved for nominated Indian members. His elevation to a position of influence within the society brought him into conflict with A. D. Patel, who until then was the undisputed leader of the Maha Sangh. K. S. Reddy's other advantage was he was based in Nadi, was a South Indian like most Maha Sangh supporters and held the powerful position of General Secretary of the union. Competition between the two reached a crisis on 31 March 1956, when at a meeting in Nadi, Reddy asked non-financial members to leave. Their refusal to leave led to police being called and tear gas used. The split between the two factions within the Maha Sangh remained until the negotiations for the 1960 sugar cane contract.

== Politician ==
K. S. Reddy later joined the Alliance Party while AD. Patel had formed the Federation Party. In the 1966 election, Reddy was given the ticket to the Western cross-voting seat by the Alliance Party. This seat was regarded as safe for the Federation Party because of its large Indian majority, but Reddy surprised everyone by winning the election and was appointed an assistant Minister in the next Alliance Government. After independence, Reddy was rewarded for his loyalty to the Alliance Party by being given a safe seat in the Central Division which he held from 1972 to 1982, except for a brief period between April 1977 to September 1977.

== Retirement and death ==
In 1981, Reddy gave notice of his intention to emigrate to Australia. He retired from Fijian politics in 1982, and died in Australia on 12 July 2006, at the age of 89.

== See also ==
- Maha Sangh
- Alliance Party

== Bibliography ==
- Sharma, Ayodhya Prasad (2005). A History of Fiji Kisan Sangh (Hindi). Lautoka, Fiji: Vicas Press. ISBN 982-9082-01-6.
- Lal, Brij V. (1997). A vision for change: AD. Patel and the politics of Fiji. ACT, Australia: Australian National University. ISBN 0-7315-2350-4.
