= Fred Archibald =

Fijian politician (died 1979)

- Archibald with his certificate of sanity

Member of the Legislative Council
- In office 1963–1966
- Preceded by: Harold Brockett Gibson
- Succeeded by: Harold Brockett Gibson
- Constituency: Northern (European)
- In office 1947–1950
- Preceded by: Harold Brockett Gibson
- Succeeded by: Harold Brockett Gibson
- Constituency: Eastern (European)

Personal details
- Died: 1979 Suva, Fiji

Frederick George Archibald (died 1979) was a Fijian planter and politician. He served as a member of the Legislative Council in two spells between 1947 and 1966.

== Biography ==
A part-European, Archibald was born into a family of planters in Vanua Levu. He ran a small copra plantation in the Savusavu area.

In the 1947 Legislative Council elections he contested the Eastern constituency and defeated incumbent MLC Harold Brockett Gibson. He was subsequently defeated by Gibson in the 1950 elections, and unsuccessfully challenged him again in 1953 and 1956. He suffered a mental breakdown in 1958 and spent some time in an asylum. Although he returned to normal life, he did not contest the 1959 elections.

In 1963 he ran against Gibson again, defeating him by 17 votes. However, after the election the result was challenged on the basis that Archibald was 'not of sound mind' and therefore ineligible to be a candidate. It emerged that after his certification in 1958, the certificate had never been cancelled due to an oversight. Following the issue being raised by the challenger, the certificate was cancelled on 11 June. Although the petition was initially dismissed as having been lodged outside the required time limit, in August the Attorney General asked the Supreme Court to declare the seat vacant. This was done by the Acting Chief Justice on 26 August, and a by-election was called for November. Archibald went on to defeat Gibson by 399 votes to 301 and was readmitted to the Legislative Council.

Subsequently, Archibald often challenged other MLCs to prove their sanity during debates, showing his certificate and claiming he was the only MLC who could. He lost his seat to Gibson again in the 1966 elections. Following a long illness, he died in the Colonial War Memorial Hospital in 1979.
