= Jonati Mavoa =

Fijian civil servant and politician

Minister of Foreign Affairs, Civil Aviation and Tourism
- In office 1983–1985
- Preceded by: Mosese Qionibaravi
- Succeeded by: Semesa Sikivou

Minister of Agriculture and Fisheries
- In office 1979–1983
- Preceded by: Charles Walker

Minister of Urban Development and Housing
- In office 1977–1979

Minister of Communications, Works and Tourism
- In office 1977

Minister for Labour
- In office 1972–1977

Minister of Social Services
- In office 1969–1972
- Preceded by: Vijay R. Singh
- Succeeded by: Vijay R. Singh

Member of the House of Representatives
- In office 1966–1985
- Succeeded by: Filipe Bole
- Constituency: Lau–Rotuma

Personal details
- Born: 12 April 1920 Kabara, Fiji
- Died: 16 June 1985 (aged 65) Auckland, New Zealand

Jonati Malamala Mavoa CMG (12 April 1920 – 16 June 1985) was a Fijian civil servant and politician. He served as an MP from 1966 until his death, and held several ministerial positions from 1969 onwards.

== Biography ==
Born in Kabara in April 1920, Mavoa was a civil servant and in 1955 became the first Fijian to be appointed a clerk to the Legislative Council. He resigned from the civil service in 1966 to join the Alliance Party and stand in the elections to the Legislative Council in the Lau–Rotuma Fijian communal constituency. He was elected unopposed, and was appointed a Parliamentary Secretary for Natural Resources. In 1969 he was appointed Minister of Social Services.

After being re-elected in 1972 (by which time the legislature had been renamed the House of Representatives), he was appointed Minister for Labour, later becoming Minister of Communications, Works and Tourism. Following the March 1977 elections he became House Leader. He was appointed Minister of Urban Development and Housing following the September 1977 elections, before becoming Minister of Agriculture and Fisheries in 1979. In 1983 he was appointed Minister of Foreign Affairs, Civil Aviation and Tourism. He was made a Companion of the Order of St Michael and St George in the 1984 New Year Honours.

He died in Auckland in June 1985, having been taken to New Zealand for medical treatment following a fall at his home.
