= Kadavu (Fijian Communal Constituency, Fiji) =

Former electoral constituency in Fiji

Kadavu Fijian Provincial Communal is a former electoral division of Fiji, one of 23 communal constituencies reserved for indigenous Fijians. Established by the 1997 Constitution, it came into being in 1999 and was used for the parliamentary elections of 1999, 2001, and 2006. (Of the remaining 48 seats, 23 were reserved for other ethnic communities and 25, called Open Constituencies, were elected by universal suffrage). The electorate covered the island of Kadavu and its outliers.

The 2013 Constitution promulgated by the Military-backed interim government abolished all constituencies and established a form of proportional representation, with the entire country voting as a single electorate.

== Election results ==
In the following tables, the primary vote refers to first-preference votes cast. The final vote refers to the final tally after votes for low-polling candidates have been progressively redistributed to other candidates according to pre-arranged electoral agreements (see electoral fusion), which may be customized by the voters (see instant run-off voting).

=== 1999 ===
Candidate	Party	Votes	%
James Ah Koy	Soqosoqo ni Vakavulewa ni Taukei	4,159	83.95
Emasi Qovu	Fijian Association Party	456	9.20
Alipate Vosawale	Christian Democratic Alliance	339	6.84
Total		4,954	100.00
Registered voters/turnout		4,954	–
SVT win			

=== 2001 ===
Candidate	Party	Votes	%
Konisi Yabaki	Soqosoqo Duavata ni Lewenivanua	2,326	54.65
James Ah Koy	Soqosoqo ni Vakavulewa ni Taukei	1,930	45.35
Total		4,256	100.00
Registered voters/turnout		4,326	–
SDL gain from SVT			

=== 2006 ===
Candidate	Party	Votes	%
Konisi Yabaki	Soqosoqo Duavata ni Lewenivanua	3,766	74.27
James Ah Koy	Independent	1,191	23.49
Rupeni Koroi	Independent	57	1.12
Semesa Matanawa	Fiji Labour Party	57	1.12
Total		5,071	100.00
Registered voters/turnout		5,059	–
SDL hold			

== Sources ==
- Psephos - Adam Carr's electoral archive
- Fiji Facts
