= James Shankar Singh =

Member of House of Representatives (Fiji) Lau/Cakaudrove/Rotuma Indian National Constituency
- In office 1972–1982
- Preceded by: Vijay R. Singh
- Succeeded by: Ahmed Ali

Nasinu/Vunidawa Indian Communal Constituency
- In office 1987–1987
- Preceded by: Satendra Nandan
- Succeeded by: Constitution abrogated

Minister of Health
- In office 1972–1982

Personal details
- Born: May 10, 1924 Ba, Fiji
- Died: July 27, 2014 (aged 90) Auckland, New Zealand
- Party: Alliance Party, National Federation Party
- Spouse: Kamla Wati Singh
- Profession: Farmer, Businessman

James Shankar Singh, MBE (May 10, 1924 – July 27, 2014) was a Fiji Indian farmer, businessman, social worker and politician who served as a Minister in the Alliance Government of Ratu Sir Kamisese Mara. Like many Fiji Indian politicians of the era, he joined the Alliance Party with a belief in mutiracialism, but was disappointed with the Alliance Party's appeal to Fijian nationalism after 1977 and left the Alliance to join the National Federation Party.

== Early life ==
James Shankar Singh, although himself a Christian convert, came from an influential Kisan Sangh supporting Arya Samaj family from Ba. After completing his primary and secondary education in Fiji, he was sent overseas for further education but returned without completing his studies. He then established a successful insurance and travel agency in Ba town. He made valuable contribution to the Red Cross and was a driving force in the establishment of the Ba Health Centre.

== Early election losses ==
With his family's involvement in sugar politics, it was only a matter of time before James Shankar Singh himself entered politics. His opportunity arose in 1963 when he stood for the North Viti Levu Indian Constituency against S.M. Koya of the Citizens Federation. The constituency included the districts of Ba, Tavua and Ra and in a tense and sometimes violent campaign Singh lost to Koya by 3,998 to 3,480 votes. This was the closest contest of the election and although Singh obtained the majority of the votes in Ba, voters from Tavua and Ra swung the election in Koya's favour. The increase in the number of Indian Communal sets in the 1966 election, led to the creation of the Ba Indian Communal Constituency, which included all the areas of the district of Ba only. Singh was expected to do well this time but lost this time to R. D. Patel of the Federation Party by 4704 to 4411 votes. In this election, although Singh had stood as an independent candidate, he supported the policies of the newly formed Alliance Party. After the two losses he took a brief break from politics, not contesting the 1968 by-election.

== Election win and ministerial appointment ==
In the 1972 election, his loyalty to the Alliance Party was rewarded with the safe seat of Vanua Levu and Lau formerly held by his relative, Vijay R. Singh. After the election he was appointed the Minister of Health. After Vijay R. Singh resigned as leader of the Indian Alliance, following his appointment as Speaker of the House of Representatives in 1976, the leadership of the Indian division of the Alliance passed on to James Shankar Singh. Following the shock defeat of the Alliance Party in the March 1977 election, the Party adopted a more emphatically ethnic Fijian policy, in order to regain its lost Fijian votes. With the rise of Ahmed Ali, who was prepared condone the new pro-Fijian policies of the Alliance Party, James Shankar Singh found himself being alienated from the party's leadership, and after he failed to get the party ticket for the 1982 election, resigned from the Alliance on the grounds of "irreconcilable differences" with Ratu Sir Kamisese Mara.

== Joining his former rivals ==
Considering that the Alliance Party had little interest in gaining Indo-Fijian votes, James Shankar Singh found himself being drawn closer to the then leader of the National Federation Party and his former arch-rival, Sidiq Koya. When Vijay R. Singh resigned his Ba National seat in 1985, James Shankar Singh nominated for the seat on behalf of the National Federation Party. Enough, his Alliance Party opponent was his brother, Uday Singh but by this time the National Federation Party was in decline with the rise of the Fiji Labour Party. This was the first election contested by the Labour Party and its candidate was the future Prime Minister of Fiji, Mahendra Chaudhry. The election was won by Uday Singh with 7848 votes defeating Mahendra Chaudhry who got 7644 votes and James Shankar Singh a distant third with 5003 votes. In the 1987 election he stood as a NFP–Labour Coalition candidate for the Nasinu/Vunidawa Indian Communal Constituency and won his seat easily but the coup of 1987 ended his political career.

== Death ==
James Shankar Singh died on 27 July 2014 at his home in Auckland, New Zealand.
