= James Ah Koy =

Fijian politician

Sir James Michael Ah Koy, KBE, CF (Chinese: 何志美; born November 30, 1936) is a Fijian businessman, politician, and diplomat. He is Executive Chairman of Kelton Investments, the IT service provider Datec Group Ltd., Honorary Consul of the Republic of Georgia to Fiji and a board director of forty-six companies. He served as a Cabinet Minister in the 1990s, and was a Senator from 2001 to 2006. He is Fiji's former ambassador to China. He served until December 2010, and was replaced by Esala Teleni.

== Early life ==
James Ah Koy was born in Lautoka to a Chinese father and to a native Kadavu mother.

== Career ==
Ah Koy's first foray into politics was in 1966, when he stood unsuccessfully as an independent candidate in the general elections that year. In the early 1980s, he became manager of a family investment company owned by the then-Prime Minister Ratu Sir Kamisese Mara, and was subsequently selected by Mara's political party, the Alliance Party, as a candidate for one of eight seats then reserved for General Electors in the House of Representatives in the parliamentary election of 1982. In 1991–1993, he led a legal challenge to the law requiring all multiracial people to register on the General Electors' roll, which at the time enrolled all Fijian citizens who are neither indigenous nor of Indian or Rotuman ancestry. The court ruled that as he was registered in the Native Land Register (Vola ni Kawa Bula, or VKB, in Fijian), he was entitled to be registered as a Fijian. He subsequently succeeded getting the law amended to give multiracial people the option of registering on either the General Electors' roll or on an ethnic role (Fijian, Indo-Fijian, or Rotuman) on which any of their ancestors would have been entitled to enroll. This change was later written into the Constitution, and allowed Ah Koy to stand for election from an ethnic Fijian communal constituency. (All seats in the House of Representatives were communal prior to 1999, and 46 of the 71 seats are still communal, elected from closed ethnic roles of voters registered as Fijians, Indo-Fijians, Rotumans, or General Electors).

Ah Koy served as Minister for Commerce, Industry, Trade, and Public Enterprises in the government of Prime Minister Sitiveni Rabuka from 1994 to 1997, when he became Minister of Finance, a position he held till his Soqosoqo ni Vakavulewa ni Taukei lost the parliamentary election of 1999. He retained his Kadavu Fijian Communal Constituency at that election, but subsequently lost it in the House of Representatives in the election of 2001. He returned to Parliament in 2003, however, when he was appointed to the Senate by the Kadavu Provincial Council to fill a vacancy caused by the death of Ratu Sela Nanovo. His appointment came about at a time when the members of the Kadavu Provincial Council were desperate for a way to salvage their province's financially troubled shipping company, the Bulou ni Ceva. They approached Ah Koy, given his business background and as one of the key players who had arranged the purchase of the ship from the People's Republic of China. Allegations were made that he agreed to help on the condition that he be appointed as the province's nominee to the Senate, but in his maiden speech, he attacked the company concerned, saying that the people of Kadavu had fallen victim to a Chinese company with "a very unsavory reputation."

== Christian Fundamentalist ==
Ah Koy is a flamboyant politician known for his uninhibited expression of controversial views. He is a Christian fundamentalist who regularly quotes from the Bible in parliamentary debates and has castigated Fijian churches for setting a poor example of racism, which he blames for the failure of the mostly Hindu and Muslim Indo-Fijians to convert to Christianity in large numbers.

On 12 May 2005, Ah Koy became embroiled in controversy over the Fijian translation of the Bible, saying that its use of the word "Kalougata" invoked pagan deities, the snake gods worshipped by the ancestors of Fijians living today. This was, he said, the root cause of generational curses afflicting the country. "Coups, murders, rapes, violence, brutality, burglaries, incest, rebellion, homosexuality and other forms of social ills and criminality are a product of a generational curse happening mostly in the indigenous Fijian community,". He attributed this curse to the frequent use of the word "Kalougata," which, he said, actually invoked a curse on the recipient rather than the intended blessing. He called on the Bible Society to come up with new words to replace the offending word. Ah Koy was supported by the Reverend Josateki Koroi, a former president of the Methodist Church who was deposed in the 1987 coups, who said that he totally agreed with his comments.

Ah Koy is also a very strong supporter of Israel, having once served as that country's honorary consul to Fiji (in 1985). Speaking on the floor of the Senate on 26 August 2004, he caused an uproar when he declared that Fiji would be "continually cursed" by God for its failure to stand with Israel in United Nations resolutions. (Prime Minister Laisenia Qarase is himself known as a friend of Israel, but has not given unconditional support at the United Nations).

== Political controversies ==
In the same debate (26 August 2004) in which Ah Koy had prophesied curses on the country for failing to support Israel, he accused the Qarase government of responsibility for the death of former First Lady Ro Lady Lala Mara. He alleged that sources close to her family had told him she had suffered a fatal heart attack after hearing the distressing news that her son-in-law, Ratu Epeli Ganilau, was to be dismissed (under pressure from the government) as Chairman of the Great Council of Chiefs, "the last straw" after her husband's death three months earlier. His comments drew a strong rebuke from the Chairman of the Kadavu Provincial Council, which Ah Koy represents in the Senate. Ratu Joe Nawalowalo called his speech "gutter material" which "belittled" the close relationship Adi Lala had enjoyed with the province.

Partly because of his close relationship with former Prime Minister Rabuka, Ah Koy was accused by some of involvement in the Rabuka and Speight coups of 1987 and 2000. No firm evidence ever came to light, and on both occasions he took legal action against media responsible for broadcasting such allegations. The Auckland High Court in New Zealand ruled in Ah Koy's favour each time. The Auckland Star (which had printed the allegations of his complicity in the Rabuka coups) went into voluntary liquidation soon afterwards, while Radio New Zealand and Television New Zealand were ordered by the court to apologise publicly to Ah Koy and his family.

In public and parliamentary speeches, Ah Koy has taken a strong stand against what he sees as the racist policies of the present government.

In a Senate debate on 1 March 2004, fellow-Senator Apisai Tora called Ah Koy a "Chinaman," a term generally considered a pejorative. Ah Koy strongly objected to the term, and Tora apologised three days later.

== Opposition to Reconciliation Commission ==
On 28 June 2005, Ah Koy declared his total opposition to the government's controversial proposal to establish a Reconciliation and Unity Commission, with the power (subject to presidential approval) to compensate victims and pardon perpetrators of the 2000 coup. He labelled the legislation as a "diabolically conceived bill with its origins in hell." Ah Koy's opposition flew in the face of its endorsement by the Kadavu Provincial Council. He acknowledged that his defiance of the council's stand might cost him his seat in the Senate, but said that he would not shrink from standing for truth as he saw it. "This Bill is anti-Bible and every Christian should vote against it if they are true to the God of Abraham, Isaac, Jacob and Israel," he said. He charged that the government's real motive in promoting the bill was to save the skins of some of its members who were being pursued by the police. He criticized Ratu Nawalowalo and the Provincial Council for supporting the bill without consulting the tribes and villages of the province.

Ah Koy renewed his attack on the bill on 26 August. Speaking in the Senate, he said that he and his family had been subjected to threats after the coup, in the wake of false accusations that he had organized and financed the coup. They were the victims of the people who had planned the coup - who were still at large, he alleged, adding that George Speight was just a pawn in the hands of those who planned the operation. The legislation was nothing more than serving one's own neck, he claimed. He reiterated his support for Military Commander Frank Bainimarama's campaign against the bill.

== Papalii title and knighthood ==
In July 2005, the Head of State of Samoa, Malietoa Tanumafili II, honoured Ah Koy with the Papalii chiefly title, in recognition of his contribution to the economy of Pacific Island nations. His Datec Group has subsidiary companies in Samoa, Tonga, Vanuatu, Australia, and New Zealand. Ah Koy, who was described by the Fiji Times as "speechless and lost for words" when he received the award, spoke of the importance of contributing to the economies of other countries, employing local people, and obeying their laws.

In the 2006 Queen's Birthday Honours, Ah Koy was knighted as a Knight Commander of the Order of the British Empire (KBE), on the nomination of the Papua New Guinean Prime Minister, Sir Michael Somare. He thus became Sir James Ah Koy, effective from 19 June 2006, a spokesman for Papua New Guinea's Governor-General, Sir Paulias Matane, announced on the 17th.

== 2006 candidate ==
On 7 February 2006, Ah Koy announced his intention to contest the upcoming parliamentary election, for his old House of Representatives seat as an independent candidate. He told the Fiji Sun that he no longer believed in party politics as it compromised the conscience of the individual, citing the Unity Bill as a potential example. "I'd rather maintain my independence than belong to a party that upholds issues I don't feel comfortable about. In the end, we’ll all have to answer to God," he said. Ah Koy told the Fiji Live news service on 22 February that he believed fraud to have been involved in his 2001 defeat.

In the election, which was held on 6–13 May, Ah Koy lost again, this time taking only 23 percent of the vote. He blamed ethnic nationalism for his defeat.

== Personal life ==
Ah Koy's father was born in China. His mother was a native of Kadavu, though her mother hailed from the village of Nasogo in Ba Province.

Ah Koy has four children (Michael, Anthony, Monica, and Carolyn) with the late Lavinia Ah Koy, a former parliamentary secretary, to whom he was married for many years prior to her death from complications relating to kidney failure in 2003. He subsequently remarried.
