= Abdul Lateef (Fijian lawyer) =

Fijian politician (died 2008)

Member of Legislative Council (Fiji) Central cross-voting constituency
- In office 1966–1972

Abdul Lateef (died on 6 June 2008) was a Fiji Indian football administrator, lawyer and politician. He served as the President of the Fiji Football Association from 1960 to 1962 and from 1966 to 1967. He was elected into the Legislative Council in 1966 from the Southern Indian cross-voting constituency on the Alliance ticket.

In 2007 he was made a life member of the Fiji Law Society.
