= National Democratic Party (Fiji, 1960s) =

- Founded: 1960s

The National Democratic Party (NDP) was a Fijian political party formed in the early 1960s through a merger of Apisai Tora's Western Democratic Party with Isikeli Nadalo's Fijian National Party. It drew its support mainly from indigenous Fijians in the Province of Ba and other Western regions, who were uneasy about potential domination by powerful chiefs from Eastern Fiji. It subsequently merged with the Federation Party, which was supported almost entirely by Indo-Fijians, to form the National Federation Party (NFP).

The NFP was dominated by personnel from the former Federation Party, which was much larger than the NDP. The merger did, however, make it possible for the NFP to appeal to a section of the indigenous Fijian electorate. Although it never received more than 10 percent of the indigenous vote, it did elect some indigenous members to what became the House of Representatives following independence in 1970, owing to cross-voting in the renamed national constituencies (seats allocated by ethnicity but elected by universal suffrage).

The party is not to be confused with a second National Democratic Party formed to contest the general election of 2006.
