= Losalini Raravuya Dovi =

Fijian politician

Adi Losalini Raravuya Dovi
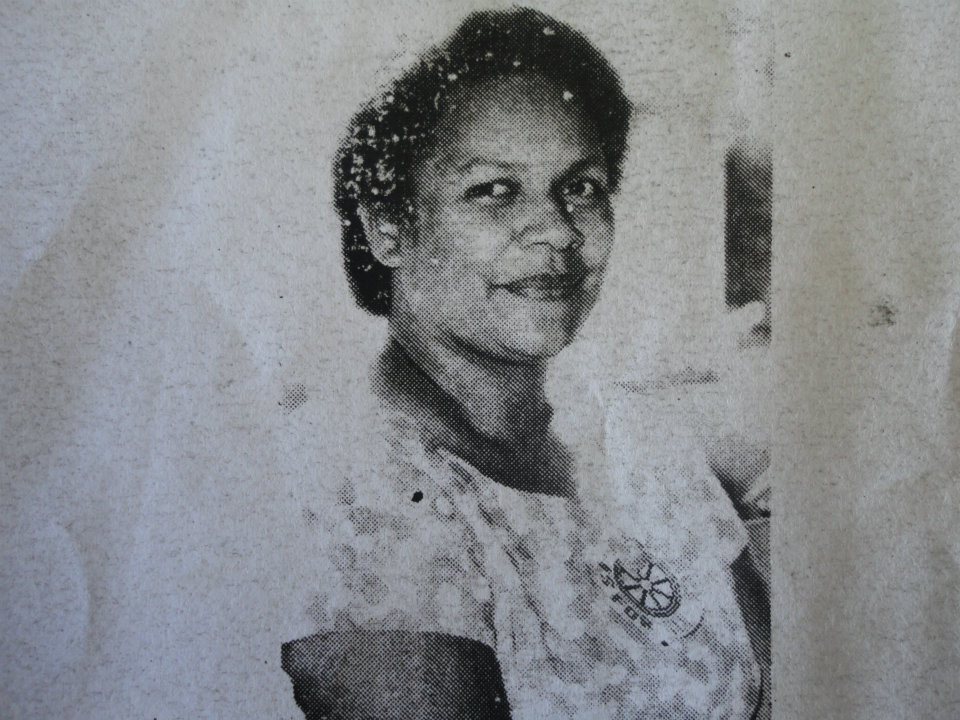

Assistant Minister for Urban Development and Social Welfare
- In office 1975–1977

Member of the House of Representatives
- In office 1972–1977
- Succeeded by: Asela Logavatu
- Constituency: South-Eastern Fijian National
- In office 1966–1972
- Constituency: Great Council of Chiefs

Personal details
- Born: Levuka, Fiji
- Died: 21 September 1983 Suva, Fiji
- Party: Alliance Party
- Spouse: J.A.R. Dovi
- Profession: Administrator

Adi Losalini Raravuya Dovi OBE was a Fijian politician and lady of rank in Fiji's chiefly leadership. In 1966 she was jointly one of the first women elected to parliament, serving in the House of Representatives until 1977. She also served as Assistant Minister for Urban Development and Social Welfare from 1975 to 1977.

== Biography ==
Dovi was the eldest child of Ratu Taniela Uluiviti and Laisani Valotu of Bau; her father was an early colonial administrator under her future brother-in-law Lala Sukuna. The elder of her two younger brothers, Nat Uluiviti, played cricket and rugby union for Fiji and later became a Senator.

After attending the Methodist mission school in Suva, Dovi began working for the Fijian Affairs Board as a clerk. She later worked for Lala Sukuna as his private secretary. She married J.A.R. Dovi, Sukuna's younger brother, who served as Roko Tui Bau and was the first Fijian to quality as a doctor. They had four children: Joni Madraiwiwi (later Vice President of Fiji), Timoci Taniela Taliai Tavanavanua, Litiana Maopa and Viviana Valotu Sofi Veisaca. Dovi later worked for Malcolm Trustram Eve when he headed enquiries into the sugar and coconut industries, and served as president of the Fiji National Council of Women.

In 1966 she joined the new Alliance Party and was briefly its secretary. In the same year, she was elected to the Legislative Council as one of two representatives of the Great Council of Chiefs, becoming one of the first female members alongside Loloma Livingston and Irene Jai Narayan. She was re-elected in 1972 from the South-Eastern Fijian national constituency. Following the elections, she was appointed Government Whip. In 1975 she became Assistant Minister for Urban Development and Social Welfare, the first woman to hold a ministerial post. However, she was not nominated for the March 1977 elections and lost her seat.

Dovi was awarded an OBE in the 1978 Birthday Honours. She died in September 1983 at the age of 53.
