= Speaker of the House of Representatives of Fiji =

The Speaker was the presiding officer of the Fijian House of Representatives. At its first session following a general election, the House members elected a Speaker and a Deputy Speaker. With a view to ensuring impartiality, the Speaker was not allowed to be a member of the House, though he was required to qualify for membership. The Deputy Speaker, however, was elected from among members of the House.

The office of Speaker was an essential feature of the parliamentary system, and has proved to be the most durable of all the Westminster parliamentary traditions.

The House of Representatives of Fiji was preceded by Legislative Council of Fiji. In the 2013 Constitution, the House of Representatives was abolished, and replaced by a single chamber Parliament.

== List of speakers of the House of Representatives of Fiji (1970–2013) ==
No.	Portrait	Speaker	Political party	Term of office	Ref
1		Sir Ronald Kermode		1970–1972	
2		R. D. Patel	National Federation Party	1972–1976	
3		Sir Vijay R. Singh	Alliance Party	1976–1977	
4		Mosese Qionibaravi	Alliance Party	1977–1982	
5		Tomasi Vakatora	Alliance Party	1982–1987	
6		Militoni Leweniqila	Alliance Party	1987	
vacant				1987–1992	
7		Dr. Apenisa Kurisaqila	Fijian Political Party	1992–2000	
vacant				2000–2001	
8		Ratu Epeli Nailatikau	Independent	2001–2006	
9		Pita Nacuva	United Fiji Party	2006	
vacant				2006–2013	
abolished				2013–present	

== See also ==
- House of Representatives of Fiji
- Senate of Fiji
- President of the Senate of Fiji
