= Ram Jati Singh =

Fijian politician (1908–1992)

Ram Jati Singh, OBE (1908–1992) was a Fiji Indian politician and landlord who was elected to the Legislative Council in the 1966 general elections on the National Federation Party (NFP) ticket. He was re-elected in the 1968 by-election with an increased majority.

He was the father of the Fijian politician Raman Pratap Singh, and the grandfather of Australian politician Lisa Singh. He had 9 sons and 3 daughters.

== Notes and references ==
- Narendra P. Singh, With the Gods and the Sea, Veran Press, NSW, Australia, 2003, ISBN 1876454121
