= Robert Munro (lawyer) =

Fijian lawyer and politician

Sir Robert Munro CBE

President of the Senate
- In office 1970–1982
- Succeeded by: Wesley Barrett

Chairman of the Fiji Broadcasting Commission
- In office 1953–1961

Nominated Member of the Legislative Council
- In office 1945–1946

Personal details
- Born: 2 April 1907 New Zealand
- Died: 12 July 1995 (aged 88)

Sir Robert Lindsay Munro (2 April 1907 – 12 July 1995) was a New Zealand-born lawyer who held several prominent positions in Fiji, including being the first chairman of the Fijian Broadcasting Corporation and the first President of the Senate.

== Biography ==
Munro was born in New Zealand, one of four brothers and a direct descendant of John Knox. One of his brothers, Leslie later became an MP and President of the United Nations General Assembly. After being educated at Auckland Grammar School, he attended Auckland University College, earning an LLB. He qualified as a barrister and solicitor in 1929. He also captained the New Zealand hockey team.

Munro moved to Fiji to join a law firm. In 1937 he married Ragnhilde Mee, a nurse with whom he had three children. In 1943 he was appointed to the Fiji Education Board and Education Advisory Council, serving until 1970. In 1945 he was also appointed a temporary nominated member of the Legislative Council. In 1946 he was a founder of the Fiji Town Planning Board, serving as its chairman until 1953. He was appointed Norwegian consul in Fiji in 1949.

In 1953 the Fiji Broadcasting Commission was established, with Munro as its first chairman, a role he held until 1961. He also served as president of the Fiji Law Society from 1960 until 1962 and again from 1967 to 1969. In the 1962 Birthday Honours he was given a CBE. In 1963 he became president of the Family Planning Association, a post he remained in until 1987. In this role, he spent nine years as Regional Vice-President of the International Planned Parenthood Federation.

At independence in 1970, a Senate was established and Munro was appointed as its first president by Prime Minister Kamisese Mara. During his time in the chair, he once suspended the Fiji Times from the Senate for three months after it published quotes he had not made. He was knighted in the 1977 Silver Jubilee and Birthday Honours, and remained president of the Senate until 1982.

He died in July 1995 at the age of 88.
