= R. D. Patel =

Fijian politician

Raojibhai Dahyabhai Patel

Speaker of the House of Representatives of Fiji
- In office 1972–1976
- Preceded by: Ronald Kermode
- Succeeded by: Vijay R. Singh

Member of House of Representatives
- In office 1972–1976
- Succeeded by: Surendra Prasad
- Constituency: Ba Communal (Indian)

Member of Legislative Council
- In office 1966–1972
- Constituency: Ba Communal (Indian)

Personal details
- Born: India
- Died: Fiji
- Party: National Federation Party
- Relatives: A. D. Patel (brother)
- Profession: Lawyer

Raojibhai Dahyabhai Patel was an Indo-Fijian lawyer and politician, who was better known as the younger brother of A. D. Patel. To distinguish between the two, he was generally referred to as R.D. A member of parliament from 1966 until 1976, he was Speaker of the House of Representatives between 1972 and 1976.

== Early life ==
R.D. Patel was born in the Kheda district of Gujarat in India. He arrived in Fiji after his brother had established his law practice in Nadi. Like his brother, he was a lawyer and worked together with him before establishing his own law practice in Ba.

== Political career ==
In the elections for the expanded Legislative Council in 1966, he was nominated for the Ba Indian Constituency. This was the most marginal seat in the 1963 election, in which Sidiq Koya had managed to defeat James Shankar Singh by only 518 votes. With the redrawing of the constituency's boundaries, the seat had become even harder for the Federation Party (NFP) to win, but after a hard campaign, R.D. Patel defeated James Shankar Singh by only 293 votes. He increased his majority in the 1968 by-election to 2000.

== Rivalry with Sidiq Koya ==
After the death of A.D. Patel in 1969, R.D. was touted as the next leader but the party chose Sidiq Koya instead. There was dissatisfaction within the National Federation Party with the concessions made by Koya to facilitate Fiji's independence, so after the 1972 election, when R.D. Patel was made the Speaker of the House of Representatives, many assumed that it was an attempt by Koya to get R.D. out of his way. While he was Speaker, he did not refrain from making public comments regarding the way Sidiq Koya was conducting his duties as leader of the NFP.

His term as Speaker was not without controversy, and when he adjourned Parliament to delay debate on a Bill that his party opposed, a vote of no-confidence was held on him in May 1973, passing by 21 votes to 15. However, with the constitution requiring a two-thirds majority for a Speaker to be removed from office, he remained in the chair. He later resigned as Speaker in 1976, only to become embroiled in the emerging conflict within the NFP. Differences within NFP were patched up for the elections held in March 1977, but R. D. Patel stood against Sidiq Koya as an independent candidate. Although he lost the election, he won a significant number of votes and "softened" Sidiq Koya for the first defeat of his political career six months later in the September elections.

R.D. Patel became the de facto leader of the Gujarati community in Fiji after his brother's death and he spent the rest of his life in community service, in particular with the Gujarat Education Society of Fiji.
