= Ujagar Singh =

Fijian politician

Ujagar Singh was a Fiji Indian politician who was elected to the Legislative Council in the 1968 by-election from the Nasinu Indian Communal Constituency.
