= Vijay R. Singh =

Fijian politician (1931–2006)

The Honourable Sir Vijay Raghubar Singh KBE

22nd Attorney General of Fiji
- In office 1977–1979
- Monarch: Elizabeth II
- Governor General: Ratu Sir George Cakobau
- Prime Minister: Ratu Sir Kamisese Mara
- Preceded by: John Falvey
- Succeeded by: Andrew Deoki

Cabinet Minister (Various portfolios)
- In office 20 September 1967 – 1976
- Monarch: Elizabeth II
- Governors General: Sir Robert Foster; Ratu Sir George Cakobau
- Prime Minister: Ratu Sir Kamisese Mara
- Governor: Sir Robert Foster; Until 10 October 1970
- Chief Minister: Ratu Sir Kamisese Mara; Until 10 October 1970

Speaker of the House of Representatives of Fiji
- In office 1976–1977
- Monarch: Elizabeth II
- Governor General: Ratu Sir George Cakobau
- Prime Minister: Ratu Sir Kamisese Mara
- Preceded by: R. D. Patel
- Succeeded by: Mosese Qionibaravi

Member for Social Services
- In office 1966–1967
- Monarch: Elizabeth II
- Governor: Sir Robert Foster; Until 10 October 1970
- Preceded by: A. D. Patel
- Succeeded by: Himself; As Minister for Social Services

Member of the Legislative Council of Fiji
- In office 1966–1972

Member, House of Representatives of Fiji
- In office 1972–1977
- Speaker: R. D. Patel (1972-1976); Himself (1976-1977)

Senator of Fiji
- In office 1977–1979
- Appointed by: Prime Minister of Fiji
- President of the Senate: Sir Robert Munro

Member, House of Representatives of Fiji
- In office 1982–1985
- Speaker: Tomasi Vakatora

Personal details
- Born: 13 July 1931 Yalalevu, Ba Province, Colony of Fiji, British Empire
- Died: 25 September 2006 (aged 75) Brisbane, Queensland, Australia
- Party: Alliance Party (1965-1979); National Federation Party (1979-1985)
- Spouse: Lady Maya Singh
- Children: 1 son, 1 daughter
- Profession: Lawyer, Trade unionist
- From 1985 to 1987 he was Chief Executive of Fiji Sugar Cane Growers Council

Sir Vijay Raghubar Singh, KBE (13 July 1931 – 25 September 2006) was an Indo-Fijian lawyer and politician who held Cabinet office in the 1960s and 1970s. Vijay Singh served in Prime Minister Ratu Sir Kamisese Mara's government in a variety of positions, including Attorney-General, and was president of the Indian Alliance, a division of the ruling Alliance Party. He quit the party in 1979 following disagreement with Alliance leadership and later joined the opposition National Federation Party. Vijay Singh was involved in the restructure of the Fiji sugar industry and was a leading member of the Jaycees movement in Fiji.

== Early life ==
Vijay Singh was born in Yalalevu, Ba, Fiji and was the eldest of 14 children. He came from a prominent Arya Samaj family in Ba. He attended the local Arya Samaj school for primary education and obtained his secondary education at Marist Brothers High School in Suva. With no tertiary education available in Fiji, and not able to afford to travel overseas for further education, he took up employment in his uncle, Hari Shankars', accountancy and import business. Seeing his determination to pursue further studies, his uncle offered to finance him to study law. He began legal studies at Lincoln's Inn in London in 1951. He graduated with a Law degree from the University of London in 1953 after only two years, the shortest period of study permissible to sit the final examination. He became a barrister of the High Courts of England, Australia, and Fiji. In February 1954, he returned to Fiji and began to practise in Labasa. He also had offices in Nadi and Suva. In 1956 he married Maya, with whom he had a son, Vinay, and a daughter, Madhu.

== Contribution to the sugar industry ==
While in Labasa, Vijay Singh became involved in cane farmers unions and was the president of the Labasa Kisan Sangh. He was also a key player in the formation of the Federation of Cane Growers (an umbrella organisation of various sugar cane unions to negotiate with the CSR) and the subsequent negotiations that took place with the Colonial Sugar Refining Company regarding the 1960 sugar cane contract. He, together with Ayodhya Prasad, of the Viti Levu-based Kisan Sangh, signed the 1960 cane contract in defiance of the majority of the Federation of Cane Growers. He later became the President of a united Kisan Sangh and held this office until the mid-1990s. He was an active leader of the joint committee of all sugar cane growers associations, established to restructure the sugar industry and when the Sugar Cane Growers Council was established in 1985, he was selected as its first Chief Executive. He also became a director of the Fiji Sugar Marketing Company, thus providing sugar cane farmers a direct say in how Fiji's sugar was marketed.

== Political legacy ==
In 1965, together with Ratu Kamisese Mara, and other organizations opposed to the Federation Party, he was involved in the formation of Fiji's first multi-racial political party, the Alliance Party. He joined the Alliance Party independently of Ayodhya Prasad's National Congress of Fiji and worked himself to a position of influence within the Party by taking up the posts of Treasurer and Publicity Manager. When the Congress was wound up in 1967, its members joined the Indian division of the Alliance Party, the Indian Alliance, with Vijay R. Singh as President. In the 1966 election, he was elected to the Legislative Council from the East-Central cross-voting seat which covered Vanua Levu and Lau. The Federation Party had no hope of winning the seat and to confuse voters selected another Vijay Singh. From then on he started to use the name, Vijay R. Singh (Vijay Raghubar Singh - using his father's first name as his middle name.) The ploy by the Federation Party backfired, as Vijay R. Singh's opponent was a clerk and he asked the electorate, "Which Vijay Singh do you wish to vote for - the clerk or the lawyer?"

Following the Alliance Party's win in the election, he was appointed the Member for Social Services, a portfolio that had been held by A. D. Patel prior to the election. This was not a ministerial post in the modern sense, as Singh and his fellow "members" comprised a minority of the Executive Council and were technically only advisers to the governor, who retained all power. However, the portfolio, which encompassed Health, Education, Housing and Social Welfare, was upgraded to a ministerial position when responsible government was introduced in September 1967. It was during his term as Minister that the University of the South Pacific was established. He also introduced a program to extend secondary education to rural areas by the establishment of Junior Secondary Schools. He was later appointed the minister of commerce, industry and cooperatives and was instrumental in the establishment of a flour mill, steel rolling mill and a second brewery in Fiji. He played an active part in multi-party talks held in London, culminating in the new constitution and Fiji's independence in 1970.

== Alienation from the Alliance Party ==
In the 1972 election, it was clear that Vijay R. Singh was losing favour with the leadership of the Alliance Party, when he was not nominated for his existing safe seat and instead was given another (less safe) seat in a constituency where he did not have any political following. He won the election and was made Minister for Housing, Urban Development and Social Welfare. Not happy with this "demotion" he soon resigned as a Minister and resumed private practice. He was then elected Deputy Speaker of the House of Representatives of Fiji of the House of Representatives. In mid-1975, when the Minister of Education announced that the Government would not subsidize school fees for non-Fijians, Vijay Singh was among its most vocal critics, describing the decision as "deplorable because of its distressingly repellent odour of crude racialism." In 1976, he was elected the Speaker and resigned from the presidency of the Indian Alliance.

In June 1976, he became the first Indo-Fijian to be knighted by the Queen for his services as a citizen, as a member of parliament, Minister and Speaker. In the 1977 election, he lost the pre-selection for Alliance Party's nomination for his National seat to the prominent K.R. Latchan. He then began speaking out publicly on issues affecting the Indian community but accepted nomination for an Indian Communal seat that he could not win.

The Alliance Party still needed him as they needed a qualified lawyer to be the Attorney General. He was appointed to the Senate and given the portfolio of Attorney General and Minister for Economic Development. Differences between him and the Alliance leadership widened and he resigned from both the party and the Senate in 1979. In 1982, he joined the National Federation Party (NFP), whose leader's moderate style appealed to him, and soon became a key adviser to its leader, Jai Ram Reddy. He won the 1982 election on the NFP ticket in a national constituency in his home town of Ba but his attempts to use foreign media to influence the election backfired and the NFP lost the election.

== Later years ==
In 1985 he resigned his seat in the House of Representatives and began work as chief executive of the Sugar Cane Growers Council but this career was cut short by the Fiji coups of 1987. In order to bring pressure on the regime in Fiji to restore democracy, he lobbied at the Commonwealth Heads of Government meeting in Vancouver in October 1987 to have Fiji expelled from the Commonwealth. He succeeded but was barred from returning to Fiji, having been declared persona non-grata. He then settled in Australia. After the restoration of democracy in Fiji he returned and resumed his law practice in Suva in 1991.

Singh's last public contribution was his book, Speaking Out, published in 2006, in which he recited his version of the events surrounding the coups in Fiji. The book offended Saula Telawa (the leader of the fringe New Nationalist Party), who called for the book to be banned in Fiji. Singh's strident criticism of some ministers of the Methodist and other churches for supporting the coups was insensitive to Christian beliefs and to the predominantly Christian indigenous Fijians, claimed Telawa, whose party calls for indigenous supremacy and for Christianity to be established as the state religion.

Singh's memoir also made controversial claims that Sitiveni Rabuka, the architect of the 1987 coups, had personally told him that he was the main instigator behind the scenes of the 2000 coup also, and that his main target was not the government of Mahendra Chaudhry, but the aging Ratu Mara, who was now president. Pleading sub judice, Rabuka refused to comment. In an audio interview broadcast on Fiji Live on 17 August, barely six weeks before his death, Singh claimed that an emotional Ratu Mara, who had abruptly resigned the Presidency in the midst of the coup crisis, had told him of his own suspicions about Rabuka. Although unsubstantiated, Singh's claims were not new: Mara's own last recorded interview had expressed strong suspicions about Rabuka's possible involvement in the 2000 coup. Singh's claimed conversation with Rabuka was, however, the first known purported confession from Rabuka.

Sir Vijay R. Singh died on 25 September 2006 in Brisbane, Australia, after a long battle with cancer.

Government offices
Preceded by A. D. Patel	Member for Social Services; 1966-1967	Succeeded by Himself; As Minister for Social Services
Preceded by	Cabinet Minister; 1967-1976	Succeeded by
Preceded by R. D. Patel	Speaker of the House of Representatives of Fiji; 1976-1977	Succeeded by Mosese Qionibaravi
Political offices
Preceded by	Member, Legislative Council of Fiji; 1966-1972	Succeeded by
Preceded by	Member, House of Representatives of Fiji; 1972-1977	Succeeded by
Preceded by	Senator of Fiji; 1977-1979	Succeeded by
Preceded by	Member, House of Representatives of Fiji; 1982-1985	Succeeded by
Legal offices
Preceded by John Falvey	Attorney General of Fiji; 1977-1979	Succeeded by Andrew Deoki
