= General electors =

Fijian term

"General Electors" is the term formerly used in Fiji to identify citizens of voting age who belonged, in most cases, to ethnic minorities. The 1997 Constitution defined General Electors as all Fiji citizens who were not registered as being of Fijian, Indian, or Rotuman descent. Also included were citizens who did qualify to be registered in the above categories, but who chose not to be. Persons of biracial or multiracial ancestry could opt to enroll either as General Electors, or as descendants of any of the other three groups to which they had an ancestral claim. General Electors were thus a diverse electorate, whose members included Europeans, Chinese, Banaban Islanders, and many smaller groups. They were allocated 3 seats in the House of Representatives, the lower and more influential house of the Fijian Parliament.

The 1997 Constitution of Fiji was a compromise between what it saw as the ideal of universal suffrage, and the practical reality of the need to protect the communal interests of Fiji's diverse ethnic communities. The House of Representatives reflected this compromise, with 46 members chosen for "communal electorates" by voters on closed electoral rolls comprising citizens of ethnic Fijian (23), Indo-Fijian (19), and Rotuman (1) ancestry, with a further 3 reserved for General Electors. Another 25 members were open to citizens of all races, and were elected by universal suffrage.

Over the years, the exact definition of General Electors varied, as did their parliamentary representation. Prior to 1994, biracial and multiracial voters were also included automatically. That year, James Ah Koy, a popular politician of ethnic Fijian and Chinese descent, successfully lobbied for a law change to allow him to register as a Fijian, rather than as a General Elector. The 1997 Constitution codified this change, giving citizens of mixed ancestry multiple options for registration. (Citizens were allowed to register for only one category, but for a small fee could change their registration at any time).

In the transitional years of the 1960s, when the British colonial rulers were preparing Fiji for independence, General Electors were allocated 10 seats in the 40 member legislature. Seven of these were elected on a closed roll consisting only of General Electors; the remaining 3 were chosen by universal suffrage. The 1970 constitution, under which Fiji became independent, reduced their representation to 8 out of 52, of which 3 were elected on the closed roll and 5 by universal suffrage. At the constitutional conference in London in April 1970, the then-Prime Minister, Ratu Sir Kamisese Mara, strongly resisted pressure to reduce the General Electors' representation further, arguing that with the numbers of ethnic Fijians and Indo-Fijians so evenly balanced, they needed the minorities as a buffer between them. Politics may have been a factor, too: General Electors were strong supporters of Mara's Alliance Party: in six parliamentary elections over a twenty-year period, they never voted against it.

In the wake of the 1987 coup, a new constitution was promulgated in 1990 aimed at enforcing and institutionalising ethnic Fijian dominance. General Electors' representation was reduced to 5 out of 71, but all were now elected on the closed roll, thereby increasing the influence of politicians responsible only to General Electors, whom the Fijian nationalists still saw as allies. A Constitutional review in 1997, however, agreed on a more equitable distribution. General Electors would be allocated 3 out of 46 "communal electorates," with the opportunity to contest, with all other groups, the 25 Open electorates. At any rate, with almost seven percent of the communal seats allocated to them, their representation was now close to their percentage of the Fijian population.

Throughout the 1990s, General Electors generally supported the General Voters' Party (a reconstitution of what had been the European faction of the now-disbanded Alliance Party), and its successor, the United General Party, (now the United Peoples Party). In the 2001 election, however, they divided their three seats among three different parties. Subsequently, the United General Party leader, Millis Beddoes, was appointed Leader of the Opposition when the Fiji Labour Party leader, Mahendra Chaudhry, declined the position. This was the first time that a General Electors' representative had served in this capacity.

A new constitution was promulgated in September 2013, abolishing ethnic representation in the newly constituted unicameral Parliament of Fiji. As a formal electoral constituency, the General Electors ceased to exist.
