= Federation Party =

- Founded: 21 June 1964
- Preceded by: Citizens Federation
- Ideology: Social democracy Federalism
- Political position: Centre-left
- Colours: Brown

The Federation Party was Fiji's first formal political party. The Citizens Federation, which had won three of the four seats reserved for Indo-Fijians at the 1963 elections, decided to formalize its role as a political party, which was officially founded on 21 June 1964 with A. D. Patel as President and Sidiq Koya as Vice-President. The merger took place in time for the party to participate in the 1965 constitutional conference which was called to map out a path towards independence from the United Kingdom. In 1968, the Federation Party merged with the National Democratic Party to form the National Federation Party, which is now (2021) the oldest political party in Fiji still in existence.

== 1965 Constitutional Conference ==
When, in late 1964, when the Government announced a constitutional conference to decide on Fiji's move to independence, it asked each ethnic group to select its own delegates. A.D. Patel nominated himself and three other Federation Party members, James Madhavan, C. A. Shah (nominated Indian member who had joined the Federation Party) and S. M. Koya. It was claimed that these did not represent the Indian community and an impasse was avoided when it was decided to invite all unofficial members to the London constitutional conference. At the conference the main difference amongst the members was that while the Federation Party members asked for common roll and immediate independence, the others wanted only a minimal change to the existing constitution.

The British Government decided to introduce cross-voting as a compromise between the Fijian and European delegates on one side and the Indians on the other. According to the cross-voting system, multiracial electorates voted for candidates of different ethnic groups. The Legislative Council was enlarged to 36 members, consisting of 14 Fijians (9 elected on a communal roll, 3 on a cross-voting roll, and two nominated by the Great Council of Chiefs), 12 Indians (9 elected on a communal roll and 3 on a cross-voting roll) and 10 Europeans (7 elected on an acommunal roll and 3 on a cross-voting roll). Some of the non-contentious proposals by the Federation Party were accepted. These were the establishment of Public Service Commission, Police Service Commission, and Judicial and Legal Services Commission and a Bill of Rights.

== From 1966 until the death of A.D. Patel ==
The outcome of the constitutional conference was a major issue during the election, which was the first election in Fiji contested on party lines. The Federation Party was expected to win at least the three cross-voting seats in the western division because of its predominantly Indian population but managed to win only the 9 Indian communal seats. The Alliance Party won 22 seats but the three independents and the two Council of Chiefs nominees joined it to give it a total strength of 27. Ratu Kamisese Mara of the Alliance Party became the Chief Minister and A.D. Patel became the Leader of the Opposition.

Ethnic tensions escalated following the adoption of responsible government in 1967, when Patel's arch-rival, the Lauan chief Ratu Kamisese Mara was appointed Chief Minister on 20 September. Mara's Alliance Party was a coalition of indigenous and European factions, with minimal Indo-Fijian participation. Patel and the NFP were consigned to the opposition benches. In protest at the new government's refusal to call a second constitutional conference, Patel led the nine Federation Party legislators in a mass walkout in September 1967.

Missing two consecutive sections of the Legislative Council resulted in the forfeit of their seats, forcing by-elections. The ensuing by-elections were marked by inter-ethnic violence. All nine Federation Party legislators were returned with increased majorities, winning 78.55% of the votes cast. A.D. Patel won by 7903 votes to 2772 for M.V. Pillay. There were demonstrations by ethnic Fijians and calls to not renew native land leases and extreme elements called for Indians to be deported from Fiji. Relations between the Indo-Fijian and indigenous communities were at a new low.

The Federation Party, represented by most of its lawyer Councillors, took up the case on behalf of the farmers when arbitration proceedings were begun on 19 August 1969 for the new cane contract. The Federation Party rejected the last cane contract, blaming it for leading the farmers deeper into debt, attacked the monopoly position of CSR, its secret accounting procedures, and concealed profits and asked for a fairer price for cane based on the price of sugar and its by-products. The Denning contract awarded the growers, 65% and the millers 35% of the proceeds of all sale, including molasses. It further guaranteed the growers a minimum price of $7.75 per ton of cane paid in two instalments. Denning commended A.D. Patel for having mastery of all the facts and problems of the sugar industry and presenting them with skill and understanding.

== Merger with the National Democratic Party ==
In November 1968, the Federation merged with the National Democratic Party to form the National Federation Party. Patel and Koya became the President and Vice-President, respectively, of the merged party. Apisai Tora and Isikeli Nadalo, both indigenous Fijians, were leading figures in the NDP, and the merger brought well-known Fijians into the party for the first time. The attempt to position itself as a multi-racial party failed to translate into significant electoral support in the indigenous Fijian community.he NFP never succeeded in getting ten percent of the Fijian vote at any poll. It did, however, manage to elect several Fijians to what became the House of Representatives after independence in 1970, owing to cross-voting in the renamed national constituencies.
