= A. D. Patel =

Fijian politician

Ambalal Dahyabhai Patel

Member for Social Services
- In office 1964–1966
- Succeeded by: Vijay R. Singh

Leader of the Opposition
- In office 1966–1969
- Succeeded by: Sidiq Koya

Member of the Legislative Council
- In office 1944–1950
- Preceded by: B. D. Lakshman
- Succeeded by: Tulsi Ram Sharma
- Constituency: Northern and Western (Indian)

Member of the Legislative Council
- In office 1963–1966
- Preceded by: Seat created
- Succeeded by: Seat abolished
- Constituency: Western (Indian)

Member of the Legislative Council
- In office 1966–1969
- Constituency: South-West Viti Levu

Personal details
- Born: 13 March 1905 Kheda, British India
- Died: 1 October 1969 (aged 64)
- Relatives: R. D. Patel (brother)

Ambalal Dahyabhai Patel, better known as A.D. Patel (13 March 1905 – 1 October 1969), was a Fijian politician, farmers' leader and founder and leader of the National Federation Party. Patel was uncompromisingly committed to a vision of an independent Fiji, with full racial integration. He was one of the first to advocate a republic, an ideal not realized in his lifetime. He also advocated a common voters' roll and opposed the communal franchise that characterized Fijian politics.

== Early life ==
Patel was born in the Kheda district of Gujarat, India, on 13 March 1905. He had three brothers and a sister. Ambalal and his younger brother, R. D. Patel, became barristers in Fiji (hence they were known as A.D. and R.D.). Ambalal received his primary and secondary education in Nadiad, which was the site used by Gandhi when he began his non-violent protest in India. He developed a habit of reading very early in his school days and excelled in secondary school. He then entered the prestigious Gujarat College in Ahmedabad and studied economics, politics and history. He graduated with Bachelor of Arts with honours in 1925 at the age of 20.

Following his early academic success, he was sent to prepare to sit for the Indian Civil Service (ICS) examination. He enrolled in the London School of Economics to improve his chances of success in the exam by gaining direct experience of the English intellectual, social and political scene. In London he rubbed shoulders with other intellectuals from the sub-continent and became aware of the plight of Indians living in the other colonies. He changed his original plan for an ICS career without conferring with his parents joined the Middle Temple to qualify as a barrister, graduating in 1928 at the age of 23.

== First marriage ==
Patel's father tried to persuade him to return and practice law in India and to help with the education of his younger siblings, but in the end helped pay his son's fare from London to Fiji, where he arrived on 11 October 1928. A reason for Patel to not want to return to India was his relationship with an English divorcee, Patricia Catherall Seymour, who had a son from her previous marriage. This was unacceptable for the Patel clan in India, especially since he had been betrothed to a girl from his community before leaving for London. Patricia Seymour arrived in Suva with her young son in 1933, and she and Patel were formally married on 25 January 1934. Their inter-racial marriage was strained by racially defined social hierarchy in Fiji. Patricia was ostracised by the local Europeans and she was unable to communicate with the local Indians. The couple separated in 1939 and divorced in 1943 and Patricia left for New Zealand.

== Early involvement in politics ==
Patel was involved in the 1929 Legislative Council election campaign, together with S. B. Patel and Vishnu Deo, but was ineligible to stand as he did not meet the two-year residency requirement for candidates. He was involved in discussions with the Governor, Sir Murchison Fletcher, to resolve the political crisis brought about by the walkout of Fiji Indian members of the Legislative Council when their demand for common roll was rejected.

By 1930 Patel had taken up leadership positions in a number of organisations. These included president of the Fiji Indian Congress, formed from the merger of two rival organisations, president of the Indian association of Fiji, president of the Indian Chamber of Commerce and Patron of the Gujarat Mandal.

In 1935, when there was a proposal to have members of the Legislative Council nominated, instead of elected, Patel, together with Vishnu Deo, led the anti-nomination campaign from outside parliament as President and Secretary of the Indian Association of Fiji.

== First election ==
Patel stood in the 1937 Legislative Council election for the North Western Indian Division. His opponent was Chattur Singh, a law clerk. Chattur Singh polled 671 votes to Patel's 651. Patel's loss was a surprise, especially since he was supported by the Indian Leadership in Fiji, which included Vishnu Deo. His defeat was due to a number of factors. Chattur Singh was a well known Ba resident, he was the President of the Ba branch of the Indian Association and his elder brother, Parmanand Singh, was one of the 3 Indians elected to the Legislative Council in 1929, Patel had angered the Muslim community because of his strong public stance against nomination (The Muslims had asked for their own representative to be nominated), Patel was a Gujarati whom the farmers saw as exploiters because of the high interest rate charged by the Gujarati merchants. The deciding factor was that Chattur Singh had turned the election to one between Fiji-born and India–born and Patel did not make the situation better when he labelled Singh as having been born in a cane field.

== General Manager of Sangam ==
In 1930 when the Sangam set up its first school, Patel became its manager. A. D. worked closely with Sadhu Kuppuswami, the founder of the Sangam, and Swami Avinashananda, sent by the Ramakrishna Mission on a fact finding mission to find out ways of promoting South Indian languages. On 31 October 1937 the Sangam was registered as a limited liability company, with Patel as general manager. Patel managed to persuade the government to exempt the Sangam from laws limiting ownership of land so that the Sangam could own up to one thousand acres (4 km^{2}). Furthermore, Patel sought Sangam representation on the Board of Education, appealed for help in getting teachers from India to teach South Indian languages, and sought building grants from the Government. His persistence paid off when the Government paid the cost to bring two South Indian teachers from India to teach in Sangam schools. Patel's involvement in the Sangam deepened with the arrival of Swami Rudrananda in 1939.

== Establishment of the Maha Sangh ==
Although, in 1938, he had rejected overtures by the Kisan Sangh to take over its leadership, in June 1941, Patel formed the Maha Sangh with the support of Swami Rudrananda. In 1943, he led the sugar cane farmers on a prolonged strike after his demands for an increase in the price of sugar cane in line with inflation was rejected by the Colonial Sugar Refining Company. When the majority of farmers refused to harvest their cane, the Government invoked the Defence Regulation and restricted Patel and Swami Rudrananda to a radius of five miles (8 km) from their homes in Nadi and required them to inform the police in person of their movements. Both Patel and Rudrananda decided to disobey the order and it landed both of them in court. This stirred up the farmers and a large number gathered in Nadi, holding prayer meetings. Shops were closed throughout the Western division. Both were fined £50 each or one month's prison in default. Both refused to pay, but before the five days allowed was over, an anonymous well-wisher paid the fine but Patel later won the case on appeal. The strike in the middle of a world war and his call for Indians to not join the army until they were given the same pay and conditions as Europeans, created a rift between Indians and Fijians which is remembered to this day.

== Election wins and losses ==
The 1943 strike propelled Patel to the forefront of the political arena in Fiji and he easily won the 1944 Legislative Council election, defeating the sitting member for North West Viti Levu, by 1841 votes to 554. He retained the seat in the 1947 election, defeating Chattur Singh by 1972 votes to 1106. In 1948, with the support of three of the five ethnic Indians in the Legislative Council, he was appointed to the Executive Council, outmaneuvering his one-time ally Vishnu Deo. In the legislative council elections in 1950, however, he was defeated by Tulsi Ram Sharma of the rival Kisan Sangh. In the 1953 election, he was defeated by his old rival, Ayodhya Prasad of the Kisan Sangh, by 2718 votes to 1919 votes. During his days in the political wilderness, Patel concentrated on his law practice and continued to support the Sangam and the Ramakrishna Mission.

== Family life ==
In 1947, while in India, Patel married Leela Ben, 20-year-old daughter of an old acquaintance of his. Patel then was 42 years old. They had five children and the break from politics between 1950 and 1963 allowed Patel to devote more time to his family and to his law practice.

== 1960 sugar cane dispute ==
With the 1950 contract due to expire in 1960, the Colonial Sugar Refining Company (CSR), in January 1959, drafted a new contract which rolled back most of the gains made by the farmers in the last 20 years. The growers were suspicious of the Company and in May 1959 decided to work together by forming the Federation of Cane Growers. Patel was a leading member of the Federation. A number of meetings were held between the Growers Federation, the Company and the Government. The Company refused to back down as it had a lot of sugar in stock and the talks soon broke down. The Governor suggested a commission of inquiry but this was rejected by Patel, who instead proposed a court of arbitration.

On 24 July 1960, Ayodhya Prasad of Kisan Sangh and Vijay R. Singh of Labasa Kisan Sangh, broke away and signed an agreement with CSR for the purchase of the 1960 crop. Tensions rose as Patel's opponents, B. D. Lakshman and Vijay R. Singh, accused him of again dividing the Indians and leading them further into debt and some Fijians, including Ratu Sir Kamisese Mara, made calls to have Patel deported. The government appointed a commission of inquiry, headed by Sir Malcolm Trustram Eve, into the sugar industry. The Federation Committee was represented by Patel, assisted by S.M. Koya. Patel wanted legislation compelling CSR to keep it book of accounts in Fiji so that the Company could not cheat farmers from the proceeds of molasses, establishment of growers co-operative mills to break the monopoly of the CSR, setting up of an independent Sugar Board to oversee smooth functioning of the industry and the abolition of the Sugar Price Stabilisation Fund.

The finding of the commission was mostly against the demands of Patel. The idea of cooperative mill was rejected because the commission believed that the farmers could not manage it when could not even manage farms on their own. The commission supported CSR's idea of setting up wholly owned subsidiary for managing its activities in Fiji and the South Pacific Sugar Mills Limited was born. Future levies to the Sugar price Stabilisation Fund were abolished, although the fund remained in existence. Instead of a Sugar Board the commission recommended an Advisory Sugar Council. The commission agreed that the CSR had profited from molasses but did not recommend price increases demanded by growers. The commission supported the Company's submission of production control by weight instead of area. On the question of sharing the proceeds from the sale of sugar, the growers ended up worse off, getting a basic share of 57.75%, much less than what had been obtained under the 1950-1959 contract (62.6%). Eve also criticised Patel for adopting policies that harmed the growers and not showing a greater sense of responsibility to the country of his adoption.

== Formation of Federation Party ==
The Federation Committee contested the 1963 Legislative Council election under the banner of Citizens Federation. It was not a properly constituted political party but sought to promote economic, cultural and political progress and stability in a united Fiji. All three Citizen's Federation candidates were elected to the Legislative Council. Patel defeated Deo Sharma, president of the Kisan Sangh by 6244 votes to 3346.

The success of the Citizens Federation in the 1963 elections, and the impending constitutional convention, prompted Patel to transform the Citizens Federation into a fully fledged political party. The Federation Party came into existence on 21 June 1964, with Patel as president and S.M. Koya as vice-president.

== Member for Social Services ==
The Membership System was introduced on 1 July 1964, and Patel was appointed as the Member for Social Services taking over responsibility for cultural activities, education, health, prisons, social welfare and charitable societies. During his two years, as Member for Social Services, he carried out a number of significant changes. These included the establishment of the Western Regional Library in Lautoka with branches in Ba, Nadi and Sigatoka, the establishment of the Fiji National Provident Fund, reform to the prisons systems to laying greater emphasis on the reformative side of prisons. Patel promoted non-racial schools and authorised the closure of schools to reduce fragmentation, duplication of effort, unnecessary competition and communal segregation. He attempted to remove race form the names of schools but was unsuccessful due to strong opposition from Fijians. He also urged the Fiji Teachers Union and the Fijian Teachers Association to unite. He also spoke out about the need for a University in Fiji.

== Events leading to independence ==
A constitutional conference in London in 1965 had made minor concessions to Indo-Fijians, abolishing educational and property qualifications for the franchise while confirming the sectarian basis of the electoral system. The September, 1966 elections were fought on the issue of the new constitution with the newly formed Alliance Party applauding it and the Federation Party denouncing it. The Federation Party won all the nine Indian communal seats, obtaining 65.25 percent of the votes cast for these seats. Patel defeated his old rival, Ayodhya Prasad by 7601 votes to 4025. Ratu Mara was elected the Chief Minister and Patel became the Leader of the Opposition.

Ethnic tensions escalated following the adoption of responsible government in 1967, when Patel's arch-rival, the Lauan chief Ratu Kamisese Mara was appointed Chief Minister on 20 September. Mara's Alliance Party was a coalition of indigenous and European factions, with minimal Indo-Fijian participation. Patel and the NFP were consigned to the opposition benches. In protest at the new government's refusal to call a second constitutional conference, Patel led the nine NFP legislators in a mass walkout in September 1967. Missing two consecutive sections of the Legislative Council resulted in the forfeit of their seats, forcing by-elections.

The ensuing by-elections were marked by inter-ethnic violence. Patel's inflammatory language - he called Ratu Mara "a crow among swans," declared that Mara was a swear-word in Gujarati, and characterized Chinese people as "eaters of cats, rats, and bats" - dissipated much of the remaining goodwill that Fijian and British leaders had towards him, and when all nine NFP legislators were returned with increased majorities (In the 1968 election, the NFP won 78.55% of the votes cast. Patel won by 7903 votes to 2772 for Manikam Pillai.), relations between the Indo-Fijian and indigenous communities appeared to be at a new low.

== The Denning Award ==
Patel again took up the case on behalf of the farmers when arbitration proceedings were begun on 19 August 1969 for the new cane contract. He rejected the Eve contract, blaming it for leading the farmers deeper into debt. He spoke about the monopoly position of CSR, its secret accounting procedures, and concealed profits. He asked for a fairer price based on the price of sugar and its by-products. The Denning contract awarded the growers, 65% and the millers 35% of the proceeds of all sale, including molasses. It further guaranteed the growers a minimum price of $7.75 per ton of cane paid in two instalments. Denning commended Patel for having mastery of all the facts and problems of the sugar industry and presenting them with skill and understanding.

== Death ==
Patel died suddenly on 1 October 1969, in the midst of negotiations leading to Fijian independence which was granted barely a year afterwards. Despite his republicanism and his strident opposition to institutionalizing ethnic and sectarian rights, which ethnic Fijians believed best protected their interests, at the time of his death he was beginning to show signs of willingness to meet indigenous leaders half-way. His successor as leader of the NFP, Sidiq Koya, did in fact agree to such a compromise with Mara at a London conference in April 1970. Mara was of the opinion, however, that had Patel lived, an agreement with him would have commanded much greater respect in the Indo-Fijian community, such was his stature among them.

Most Fijian leaders today take a kinder view of Patel. In 2005, then-Vice-President Ratu Joni Madraiwiwi concluded after a study of Patel's private correspondence that in reality he was not unsympathetic to indigenous interests, but was misunderstood.
