= Communal constituencies =

Type of Fijian electoral constituency

Communal constituencies were electoral constituencies in Fiji in which seats were allocated to particular ethnic communities and voters on communal rolls elected representatives from their own community. They were used alongside other forms of constituency during much of Fiji's colonial and post-independence electoral history.

Separate communal representation developed under British colonial rule. European voters were given reserved seats in the Legislative Council in 1904, and Indian representation was later introduced. Under constitutional reforms in 1936, three Indian members were elected from communal constituencies, while indigenous Fijians continued to be represented by nominees until direct voting was introduced in 1963. The constitutional settlement preceding independence established a 52-member House of Representatives with 27 communal and 25 national constituencies. After the 1987 coups, the 1990 Constitution made all parliamentary seats communal and provided for an indigenous Fijian majority. The 1997–1998 constitutional settlement restored a mixed system, with 46 communal seats and 25 open constituencies. Rules for multiracial voters were also changed to allow people of mixed ancestry to register on any communal roll for which an ancestor would have qualified.

== History ==
In 1904, the British colonial authorities reserved seven seats in the Legislative Council for European voters; in 1929, provision was made for wealthy Indians to elect one representative also. Although the number allocated to the various ethnic communities varied over the years, the basic manner of election did not change. It avoided electoral competition between candidates of different races.

With the constitutional reform of 1936, three Indian members of the Legislative Council were chosen by voters in communal constituencies. Indigenous Fijians, however, were represented by five nominees of the governor advised by the Great Council of Chiefs and did not vote directly for their representatives until 1963. The philosophy at the time was that this model reflected the communalism of village life; that cultural identity took priority over individual interests; and that chiefs were best placed to represent ethnic Fijians.

In the 1960s, the Indo-Fijian dominated National Federation Party (NFP) began to press for universal suffrage on a common voters' roll. Indigenous Fijian leaders opposed this demand, fearful that it would favour Indo-Fijians, who then comprised more than half of the country's population. As a compromise, a number of national constituencies were established, allocated ethnically but elected by universal suffrage, but 25 of the 36 seats in the Legislative Council remained communal.

Negotiations leading to independence from the United Kingdom were complicated by continuing demands from the NFP for a non-racial franchise. The death of the NFP founder A.D. Patel in October 1969, however, led to his replacement by Sidiq Koya, who was more flexible and enjoyed a personal rapport with Ratu Sir Kamisese Mara, the Chief Minister and leader of the Alliance Party, which represented mostly indigenous Fijians. Koya and Mara agreed to a compromise at a conference in London in April 1970, which reduced the ratio of communal constituencies over national constituencies and left open the possibility of a future move to a common voters' roll. They agreed to establish a 52-member House of Representatives with 27 communal and 25 national constituencies. Indigenous Fijians and Indo-Fijians were each allocated 12 communal constituencies; minority groups were allocated 3.

The Fiji coups of 1987 were orchestrated by hardline Fijian ethno-nationalists who forced the abolition of the national constituencies, on the grounds that they gave a non-indigenous voters a say in who represented the indigenous Fijian community. The revised constitution made all parliamentary seats communal, with a built-in indigenous majority. 37 seats were allocated to indigenous Fijians and 27 to Indians, despite the near parity of their population numbers at that time. 5 seats were assigned to minority groups.

The constitution was revised again in 1997–1998. A constitutional commission chaired by Sir Paul Reeves, a former Governor General of New Zealand, recommended retaining 25 communal constituencies, along with 45 newly created open constituencies, to be elected by universal suffrage and contested by candidates from all races. The ruling Soqosoqo ni Vakavulewa ni Taukei of Prime Minister Sitiveni Rabuka and the National Federation Party (which had formerly advocated a common roll) saw the communal seats allocated to indigenous Fijians and Indo-Fijians respectively as their power base, and insisted on reversing the ratio. Consequently, 23 seats were allocated to indigenous voters, 19 to Indo-Fijians, 1 to Rotuman Islanders, and 3 to minority groups; the remaining 25 represented open constituencies.

In the 1999 elections, the size of the overall Fijian vote across all communal constituencies was 179,218, while the vote for all Fijian parties and independents in open constituencies was 177,490.

== Multiracial voters ==
Multiracial citizens were formerly required to enroll on the General Electors's roll, or according to the race of their father. In the 1990s, Chinese-Fijian businessman and politician James Ah Koy challenged this rule in court. The law, and later the Constitution, were consequently amended to allow persons with multiple ethnic origins to register on any communal roll for which any of their ancestors, in either the male or female line, would have qualified. Many Fijian citizens of mixed Fijian and European origin, commonly known as Vasus, have since transferred from the General Electors' communal roll to the Fijian one.

This generated some controversy in the leadup to the parliamentary election scheduled for 2006. United Peoples Party leader Mick Beddoes expressed concern that electoral officials were encouraging members of minority communities to register on the Fijian communal roll, and were failing to provide them with the necessary forms to enroll as General Electors.
