= Chief Minister of Fiji =

Former head of government of Fiji

The office of Chief Minister of Fiji was established by the British colonial authorities on 20 September 1967, along with the Cabinet system of government. This was part of an ongoing move to forge modern political institutions to prepare Fiji for independence, which was granted on 10 October 1970.

The Chief Minister, who was appointed by the colonial Governor, had to retain the support of a majority of the Legislative Council. As Ratu Sir Kamisese Mara's Alliance Party controlled a majority of the seats, he was appointed to this post, which was renamed Prime Minister upon independence.

== List of chief ministers of Fiji (1967–1970) ==
№	Portrait	Name (Birth–Death)	Term start	Term end	Political party
Chief Minister of the Colony of Fiji
1		Ratu Sir Kamisese Mara (1920–2004)	20 September 1967	10 October 1970	Alliance Party

== See also ==
- Prime Minister of Fiji
