= Alliance Party (Fiji) =

Political party in Fiji

The Alliance Party, was the ruling political party in Fiji from 1966 to 1987. Founded in the early 1960s, its leader was Kamisese Mara, the founding father of the modern Fijian nation. Widely seen as the political vehicle of the traditional Fijian chiefs, the Alliance Party also commanded considerable support among the Europeans and other ethnic minorities, who, although comprising only 3–4% of Fiji's population, were over represented in the parliament (with a third of the seats before 1973, and a sixth thereafter, allocated to them). Indo-Fijians were less supportive, but the Fijian-European block vote kept the Alliance Party in power for more than twenty years.

== Formation of the Alliance Party ==
The formation of the Alliance Party was the direct result of the call, in November 1965, by the Governor, Sir Derek Jakeway, "for leaders of imagination, who have the interests of all the people of Fiji truly at heart, to build political alliances with the object of contesting elections on a common racial platform and then, if they win a majority of seats, forming a broad based administration which will be effectively self-governing". In 1965, there already existed in Fiji political organisations which represented various interest groups (but no other political party like the Federation Party). These were the Fijian Association, which was formed in 1956 to "counter the Indian demand for political reform", the National Congress of Fiji formed by Indians opposed to the Federation Party, the General Electors Association representing the Europeans and Part-Europeans, the Suva Rotuman Association, the Rotuman Convention, the Chinese Association, the All-Fiji Muslim Political Front, the Fiji Minority Party and the Tongan Organization. On 12 March 1966, all these organisations came together under the leadership of Kamisese Mara to form the Alliance Party.

== 1966 general election ==
When the 1966 general election was held, the Alliance Party had been in existence for only six months, consequently there was little co-ordination of activities between its affiliated organisations. Candidate selection was not streamlined and in four Fijian communal constituencies, the Fijian Association allowed its own members to stand against the Alliance endorsed candidates. Some candidates for the Indian communal constituencies stood in the election under the National Congress of Fiji banner. Sometimes individual ambition superseded party loyalty as seen by the case where a European member, on failing to obtain Alliance endorsement, resigned, stood as an independent, won the election, re-joined the Alliance and was made a Minister. In the end, the Alliance, won a landslide victory, taking 22 of the 34 directly elected seats. Its greatest achievement was winning the three cross-voting seats in the western division, where the large Indian majority was expected to elect Federation Party candidates. After the election the three independents and two nominees of the Great Council of Chiefs, also joined the Alliance to give it a total of 27 seats. The remaining 9 seats were won by the NFP, led by A. D. Patel. Owing to the victory of the Alliance, Ratu Mara was appointed Chief Minister when responsible government was introduced in September 1967.

== 1977 to 1987 ==
The rule of the Alliance Party was briefly challenged in the election of March 1977, when a split in the ethnic Fijian vote resulted in the loss of nine seats. The Alliance ended up with 24 seats in the 52-seat parliament, two less than the Indo-Fijian-dominated National Federation Party (NFP). A constitutional crisis developed when, three days after the election, the NFP splintered in a leadership brawl, and the Governor General of Fiji, Ratu Sir George Cakobau, asked the Mara government to remain in power in a caretaker capacity. A second election was held in September that year to resolve the impasse; the Alliance was returned with an unprecedented 36 seats out of 52.

The majority of the Alliance Party was reduced in the 1982 election, but with 28 seats out of 52, it retained office. In April 1987, the party was finally beaten by a multi-racial coalition led by Timoci Bavadra, an ethnic Fijian who nevertheless drew most of his support from the Indo-Fijian population.

After less than a month in office, the new government was deposed in a military coup led by Lieutenant Colonel Sitiveni Rabuka. After several months of turmoil, the former Prime Minister Ratu Mara, the Alliance Party leader, was called back to head a transitional government. As part of a major realignment of Fijian politics, however, the Alliance Party was dissolved.

== Attempts to revive the Alliance ==
More than fifteen years after the disbanding of the Fijian Alliance, Ratu Epeli Ganilau, Chairman of the Great Council of Chiefs from 2001 to 2004, and a son-in-law of the late Ratu Mara, formally registered the National Alliance Party of Fiji on 18 January 2005 as a claimed successor to the defunct party. Ganilau launched the new party at a mass rally in Suva on 8 April 2005.

The Fijian Alliance was considered to be a centre-right party, and was a member of the International Democrat Union, an umbrella-organization of moderate right-wing parties from many countries, including the Republican Party of the United States, the British Conservative Party, and the Australian Liberal Party.
