= Indian members of the Legislative Council of Fiji =

The number of Fiji Indians that could be elected to the Legislative Council was fixed over the years as follows:

- 1916 - 1929 - one nominated member.
- 1929 - 1937 - three elected members.
- 1937 - 1963 - three elected and two nominated members.
- 1963 - 1966 - four elected and two nominated.
- 1966 - 1972 - nine elected from communal constituencies and three from cross-voting constituencies.

== List of Indian members ==
- Badri Maharaj (1916–1923, 1926–1929) was the first Indian member of the Legislative Council in Fiji. He was nominated by the Governor in 1916 and was not very popular with Fiji Indians who wanted Manilal Doctor to be their representative. Maharaj resigned in 1923 in opposition to a proposed poll tax, but was re-nominated in 1926. He remained a member until 1929 when Indians were elected for the first time.
- Vishnu Deo (1929, 1937–1959) was first elected in 1929. He sat in the Council for only 2 weeks before walking out in protest at his proposal for common roll not being accepted. He was ineligible to contest the 1932 election, having been convicted for publishing inappropriate material. He re-entered the Council in 1937 and remained a member, representing the Southern Constituency, until 1959 when he retired due to ill-health. He was elected to the Executive Council in 1956.
- James Ramchandar Rao (1929) was one of the three Fiji Indians elected to the Legislative Council of Fiji in October 1929 when Indians in Fiji were given the first opportunity to elect their own representatives. He won the seat for the Eastern Constituency, defeating his opponent Sahim Khalil by 63 votes to 20. Two weeks after being sworn in he, together with the other two Fiji Indian representatives, resigned when a motion asking for equal political rights for Fiji Indians was defeated.
- Parmanand Singh (1929) was one of the three Fiji Indians elected to the Legislative Council of Fiji in October 1929 when Indians in Fiji were given the first opportunity to elect their own representatives. He won the seat for the North Western Constituency after defeating his opponent Dr. C. M. Gopalan. Two weeks after being sworn in he, together with the other two Fiji Indian representatives, resigned when a motion asking for equal political rights for Fiji Indians was defeated.
- K. B. Singh (1932–1947) First elected in 1932, with the support of Vishnu Deo to oppose a rebel Indian candidate. He resigned his seat soon under pressure from Vishnu Deo but was subsequently re-elected with an increased majority. He then split with Vishnu Deo and remained in Council until 1937 representing the Southern Constituency. After the 1937 he was chosen as a council member nominated by the Governor, and remained in Council until 1947. In 1946 he was appointed to the Executive Council.
- Muniswamy Mudaliar (1932–1937) He was elected to the Council in 1932 from the North Western Constituency, with the support of Vishnu Deo to provide a seconder to the common roll motion. He refused to resign after the motion was defeated and remained in the Council until the next election in 1937.
- J. B. Tularam (1937–1944) was elected from the Eastern Constituency in 1937.
- Chattur Singh (1937–1940) caused a major sensation in Fiji Indian politics when he defeated the favoured A.D. Patel for the North Western seat by 671 votes to 651 in the 1937 election. He is reputed to have won by making the issue in the election to be a contest between India born (Patel) and Fiji born (Singh).
- Said Hasan (1937 - ?) was a nominated member the Council, appointed by the Governor in 1937.
- B. D. Lakshman (1940–1944, 1959–1963)won the North Western seat in the 1940 election with the support of the Kisan Sangh and after spending 15 years in the political wilderness regained his seat in the 1959 election. He tried another comeback in 1977 but made no headway.
- A. D. Patel (1944–1950, 1963–1969) was not eligible to contest the 1929 elections because of residency requirements. In 1937 he stood for the North Western Constituency and was defeated by Chattur Singh in an upset result. With the support of the farmers union, the Maha Sangh, he contested and won the 1944 and 1947 elections. He then suffered two defeats in 1950 and 1953. He returned to politics in 1963 and formed the Federation Party and remained its leader until his death in 1969.
- Ami Chandra (1947–1950) was a nominated member of the Legislative Council in 1947.
- James Madhavan (1947–1972) was first nominated into the Council in 1947 but from 1950 has continuously represented Labasa in the Council.
- M. S. Buksh was a nominated member of the Legislative Council in 1947.
- Tulsi Ram Sharma (1950–1953) was a one-term member representing the North Western Constituency, when he defeated A.D. Patel in 1950.
- Ben Jannif (1950–1953) was a nominated member of the Council.
- Ayodhya Prasad (1953–1959) served two terms as the member for North Western Constituency.
- K. S. Reddy (1953–1956, 1966–1972) was first nominated into the Council in 1953 and in 1966 won the Western cross-voting seat as an Alliance candidate.
- Andrew Deoki (1956–1966) was initially appointed as an Indian nominated member from 1956 to 1959. He won the Southern Indian seat in the 1959 and was appointed to the Executive Council. He retained his seat in the 1963 elections but lost to Irene Jai Narayan in 1966. He stood as an independent candidate in a national seat in 1972 but did poorly. From 1979 to 1981 he was appointed to the Senate of independent Fiji, by the Prime Minister, Ratu Mara, and was a member of the cabinet as the Attorney General.
- A. R. Manu (1956–1959) was an Indian nominated member.
- Vijay R. Singh (1966–1972) was first elected to the Council as an independent candidate in 1959. He was one of the founding members of the Alliance Party and won the Vanua Levu/Lau cross-voting constituency for the party in the 1966 election. He continued to serve in the parliament of Fiji after independence - in the House of Representatives from 1972 to 1977 and in the Senate from 1977 to 1979. He held a number of senior ministerial positions.
- Sathi Narain (1959–1963) was a nominated member of the Council.
- A. H. Sahu Khan (1959–1963) was a nominated member of the Council.
- Sidiq Koya (1963–1972) was the first Muslim to be elected to the Legislative Council. He became leader of the NFP following the death of A.D. Patel in 1969. He was the first Leader of the Opposition of independent Fiji but lost the 1977 election after the NFP split into two factions. He was returned in 1982 in a reunited NFP and served as leader again from 1984 to 1987.
- C. P. Singh (Chandra Pal Singh) (1963–1966) was a nominated member of the Council.
- C. A. Shah (1963–1972) was nominated to the Council in 1963. He aligned himself with the Federation Party and won the 1966 election as an NFP candidate. He won the 1968 by-election with an increased majority.
- Irene Jai Narayan (1966–1972) was the first Fiji Indian woman to be elected to the Council when she won the Suva Indian seat for the NFP in 1966. She won the 1968 by-election with an increased majority. She remained a member of independent Fiji's House of Representatives from 1972 to 1987 winning the 1972, 1977 (March), 1977 (September) and the 1982 elections. In 1987 she joined the Alliance Party when lost it the Suva National seat and the Government. She served in the transitional government (of Sitiveni Rabuka) between 1987 and 1992 as Minister for Indian Affairs. She was a Government appointed Senator from 1994 to 1999.
- K. C. Ramrakha (1966–1972) was first elected on the NFP ticket in 1966. He returned with an increased majority in the 1968 by-election. After independence he served in the House of Representatives from 1972 to 1982.
- M. T. Khan (1966–1968) was elected on NFP tisket in 1966 but changed sides and contested the 1968 by-election for the Alliance Party and lost. He was elected to the House of Representatives in 1972 and served as a Minister.
- Ram Jati Singh (1966–1972) was first elected on the NFP ticket in 1966. He was returned with an increased majority in the 1968 by-election.
- R. D. Patel (1966–1972) was first elected on the NFP ticket in 1966. He was returned with an increased majority in the 1968 by-election. In 1972 he was elected to the House of Representatives and served as Deputy Speaker.
- Abdul Lateef (1966–1972) was elected to the Council in 1966 on the Alliance ticket representing the Southern Indian cross-voting constituency.
- Ujagar Singh (1968–1972) was first elected on the NFP ticket in 1968.
