= 1937 Fijian general election =

General elections were held in Fiji in July 1937, the first in which an equal number of Europeans and Indo-Fijians were elected.

== Background ==
The elections had originally been due in 1935, but in July 1936 the term of the Legislative Council elected in 1932 was extended until 1936 following the passing of a motion by the elected members to make the Council an entirely appointed body due to concerns that Indo-Fijian voters would outnumber Europeans. The same concerns had led to the abolition of elections to Suva Municipal Council earlier in the year.

== Electoral system ==
Following the changes to the constitution that allowed Indo-Fijians to vote in Legislative Council elections for the first time in 1929, further constitutional amendments were made in July 1936 that provided for an equal number of seats for Europeans, Fijians and Indo-Fijians in the Legislative Council, which was expanded from 25 to 31 members (with the Governor also sitting as President of the Council). The number of appointed civil servants was increased from 13 to 16, whilst there were five 'unofficial' members from each of the three main ethnic groups and the Governor sitting as President of the Council.

For Europeans and Indo-Fijians, three of the five representatives were elected from single-member constituencies, with the other two appointed by the Governor. All five Fijian members were appointed from a list of ten candidates submitted by the Great Council of Chiefs.

Voting for Europeans remained restricted to men aged 21 or over who had been born to European parents (or a European father and was able to read, speak and write English), who were British subjects and had been continuously resident in Fiji for 12 months, and who either owned at least £20 of freehold or leasehold property or had an annual income of at least £120. A total of 1,348 Europeans were registered to vote.

For Indo-Fijians, eligibility was also restricted to men aged 21 or over. They had to be a British subject or from British India, have lived continuously in the Fiji for at least two years, be able to read or write in English, Gujarati, Gurmukhi, Hindi, Tamil, Telugu or Urdu, and for the previous six months, have either owned property with an annual value of five years, had a net annual cash income of at least £75, or held a Government or municipal licence worth at least £5 annually. A total of 2,813 Indo-Fijians were registered to vote.

In both ethnic categories, civil servants were barred from voting.

== Results ==
In the four contested constituencies, 2,363 of the 2,497 registered voters participated in the election, a voter turnout of 94.6%.

Constituency	Candidate	Votes	%	Notes
European members
Eastern	Harold Brockett Gibson	143	55.2	Elected
Eastern	William Edmund Willoughby-Tottenham	116	44.8	Unseated
Eastern	Informal votes	6	–	
Eastern	Total	265	100	
Eastern	Registered voters/turnout	307	86.3	
Northern and Western	Hugh Ragg	255	55.9	Re-elected
Northern and Western	John Percy Bayly	201	44.1	Unseated
Northern and Western	Informal votes	4	–	
Northern and Western	Total	460	100	
Northern and Western	Registered voters/turnout	507	90.7	
Southern	Alport Barker	Unopposed		Re-elected
Indo-Fijian members
Eastern	J. B. Tularam	132	52.8	Elected
Eastern	Channa Bhai Patel	118	47.2	
Eastern	Total	250	100	
Eastern	Registered voters/turnout	275	90.9	
Northern and Western	Chattur Singh	671	50.8	Elected
Northern and Western	A. D. Patel	651	49.2	
Northern and Western	Informal votes	66	–	
Northern and Western	Total	1,388	100	
Northern and Western	Registered voters/turnout	1,408	98.6	
Southern	Vishnu Deo	Unopposed		Elected
Source: Fiji Elections

=== Nominated members ===
The Great Council of Chiefs submitted their list of ten candidates to the Governor in late 1936; George Tuisawau, Lala Sukuna, Isireli Tawake, Tiale Vuiyasawa, Deve Toganivalu, G. Lala, E. Mataitini, George Toganivalu, Penijamini Veli and Popi Cakobau. Cakobau died shortly after being shortlisted by the Council.

Europeans
Henry King Irving
John Maynard Hedstrom
Fijians
Lala Sukuna
Isireli Tawake
Deve Toganivalu
George Tuisawau
Penijamini Veli
Indo-Fijians
Said Hasan
K. B. Singh
Source: PIM

John Maynard Hedstrom resigned from the Council in December 1937, and was replaced by John Trotter. Deve Toganivalu resigned shortly afterwards and was replaced by Glanville Lalabalavu. Following the death of Penijamini Veli in August 1938, Tiale Vuiyasawa was appointed as his replacement.
