= 1944 Fijian general election =

General elections were held in Fiji on 29 July 1944. The term of the Legislative Council elected in 1940 was due to end in 1943, but was extended by a year by the Governor.

== Electoral system ==
The Legislative Council consisted of 32 members, including 16 'official' members who were civil servants, fifteen 'unofficial' members (five Europeans, five Fijians and five Indo-Fijians), and the Governor sitting as President of the Council.

For Europeans and Indo-Fijians, three of the five representatives were elected from single-member constituencies, with the other two appointed by the Governor. All five Fijian members were appointed from a list of ten candidates submitted by the Great Council of Chiefs.

Voting for Europeans remained restricted to men aged 21 or over who had been born to European parents (or a European father and was able to read, speak and write English), who were British subjects and had been continuously resident in Fiji for 12 months, and who either owned at least £20 of freehold or leasehold property or had an annual income of at least £120. For Indo-Fijians, eligibility was also restricted to men aged 21 or over. They had to be a British subject or from British India, have lived continuously in the Fiji for at least two years, be able to read or write in English, Gujarati, Gurmukhi, Hindi, Tamil, Telugu or Urdu, and for the previous six months, have either owned property with an annual value of five years, had a net annual cash income of at least £75, or held a Government or municipal licence worth at least £5 annually.

Special provision for overseas voting was set up for Fijian civil servants and military personnel serving outside the territory.

== Results ==
Constituency	Candidate	Votes	%	Notes
European members
Eastern	Harold Brockett Gibson	Unopposed		Re-elected
Northern and Western	Hugh Ragg	221		Re-elected
Northern and Western	John Percy Bayly	195		
Southern	Amie Ragg	451		Elected
Southern	Alport Barker	265		Unseated
Indo-Fijian members
Eastern	B. M. Gyaneshwar	399		Elected
Eastern	J. B. Tularam	201		Unseated
Northern and Western	A. D. Patel	1,841		Elected
Northern and Western	B. D. Lakshman	554		Unseated
Southern	Vishnu Deo	Unopposed		Re-elected
Source: Fiji Elections

=== Nominated members ===
Europeans
Jasper Garnett
William Granger Johnson
Fijians
Edward Cakobau
Lala Sukuna
George Toganivalu
George Tuisawau
Tiale Vuiyasawa
Indo-Fijians
A. R. Sahu Khan
K. B. Singh
Source: Pacific Islands Monthly
