= 1950 Fijian general election =

General elections were held in Fiji in August 1950. Voting took place in most locations on 26 August, and in the Lau and Lomaiviti Islands between 21 and 28 August.

== Electoral system ==
The Legislative Council consisted of 32 members, including 16 'official' members who were civil servants, fifteen 'unofficial' members (five Europeans, five Fijians and five Indo-Fijians), and the Governor sitting as President of the Council.

For Europeans and Indo-Fijians, three of the five representatives were elected from single-member constituencies, with the other two appointed by the Governor. All five Fijian members were appointed from a list of candidates submitted by the Great Council of Chiefs; usually ten names were submitted, but as there was a tie for tenth place in the vote carried out by the Council of Chiefs in July, a list of eleven was put forward.

Voting for Europeans remained restricted to men aged 21 or over who had been born to European parents (or a European father and was able to read, speak and write English), who were British subjects and had been continuously resident in Fiji for 12 months, and who either owned at least £20 of freehold or leasehold property or had an annual income of at least £120. For Indo-Fijians, eligibility was also restricted to men aged 21 or over. They had to be a British subject or from British India, have lived continuously in the Fiji for at least two years, be able to read or write in English, Gujarati, Gurmukhi, Hindi, Tamil, Telugu or Urdu, and for the previous six months, have either owned property with an annual value of five years, had a net annual cash income of at least £75, or held a Government or municipal licence worth at least £5 annually.

== Results ==
In the Eastern European constituency, Harold Brockett Gibson defeated the incumbent Fred Archibald by eleven votes, whilst in the Eastern Indian constituency James Madhavan beat J. B. Tularam by a margin of 368 votes.

Constituency	Candidate	Votes	%	Notes
European members
Eastern	Harold Brockett Gibson			Elected
Eastern	Fred Archibald			Unseated
Northern and Western	Maurice Scott	Unopposed		Re-elected
Southern	Alport Barker	316		Elected
Southern	Amie Ragg	182		Unseated
Southern	Robert Spowart	174		
Indo-Fijian members
Eastern	James Madhavan			Re-elected
Eastern	J. B. Tularam			
Northern and Western	Tulsi Ram Sharma	2,340		Elected
Northern and Western	A. D. Patel	1,858		Unseated
Southern	Vishnu Deo	1,681		Re-elected
Southern	Hari Charan	1,446		
Source: Pacific Islands Monthly

=== Nominated members ===
Europeans
Clive Elliot
Harold Gatty
Fijians
Edward Cakobau
George Cakobau
George Toganivalu
George Tuisawau
Ravuama Vunivalu
Indo-Fijians
Sadanand Maharaj
Ben Jannif
Source: Fiji Elections, Fiji Royal Gazette

== Aftermath ==
Edward Cakobau resigned from the Council in 1952 and was replaced by Tiale Vuiyasawa.
