= 1953 Fijian general election =

General elections were held in Fiji on 29 August 1953.

== Electoral system ==
The Legislative Council consisted of 32 members, including 16 'official' members who were civil servants, fifteen 'unofficial' members (five Europeans, five Fijians and five Indo-Fijians), and the Governor sitting as President of the Council.

For Europeans and Indo-Fijians, three of the five representatives were elected from single-member constituencies, with the other two appointed by the Governor. All five Fijian members were appointed from a list of ten candidates submitted by the Great Council of Chiefs.

Voting for Europeans remained restricted to men aged 21 or over who had been born to European parents (or a European father and was able to read, speak and write English), who were British subjects and had been continuously resident in Fiji for 12 months, and who either owned at least £20 of freehold or leasehold property or had an annual income of at least £120. For Indo-Fijians, eligibility was also restricted to men aged 21 or over. They had to be a British subject or from British India, have lived continuously in the Fiji for at least two years, be able to read or write in English, Gujarati, Gurmukhi, Hindi, Tamil, Telugu or Urdu, and for the previous six months, have either owned property with an annual value of five years, had a net annual cash income of at least £75, or held a Government or municipal licence worth at least £5 annually.

== Campaign ==
Leaders of the Muslim Indo-Fijian community urged a boycott of the elections, calling for separate representation and for Urdu to be taught instead of Hindi.

== Results ==
Constituency	Candidate	Votes	%	Notes
European members
Eastern	Harold Brockett Gibson	227	49.7	Re-elected
Eastern	Fred Archibald	210	46.0	
Eastern	William Edmund Willoughby-Tottenham	20	4.4	
Northern and Western	Maurice Scott	Unopposed		Re-elected
Southern	John Falvey	487	59.8	Elected
Southern	James Burton Turner	238	29.2	
Southern	Charles Phillips	89	10.9	
Indo-Fijian members
Eastern	James Madhavan	886	55.7	Re-elected
Eastern	Odin Ramrakha	706	44.3	
Northern and Western	Ayodhya Prasad	2,043	47.5	Elected
Northern and Western	A. D. Patel	1,919	44.6	
Northern and Western	Tulsi Ram Sharma	280	6.5	Unseated
Northern and Western	Babubhai Patel	54	1.3	
Northern and Western	Hari Shankar	5	0.1	
Southern	Vishnu Deo	2,365	64.5	Re-elected
Southern	Hari Charan	1,288	35.1	
Southern	Hari Charan Akheel	12	0.3	
Source: Pacific Islands Monthly

=== Nominated members ===
Type	Member
Unofficial members
Europeans	Stanley Cowled
Europeans	William Granger Johnson
Fijians	Edward Cakobau
Fijians	Kamisese Mara
Indo-Fijians	K. S. Reddy
Indo-Fijians	Abdul Samad
Official members
Accountant General	W.E. Donovan
Commissioner of Police	E.K. Laws
Comptroller of Customs	A.R. Smith
Director of Agriculture	C. Harvey
Director of Education	G. Arthur
Director of Labour	C.S. Reay
Director of Lands	R.V. Cole
Director of Medical Services	J.M. Cruikshank
Director of Public Works	J.P. Bruen
Secretary for Fijian Affairs	Lala Sukuna
Appointed	George Cakobau
Appointed	C.R. Nott
Appointed	Brahmanand Raghvanand
Ex officio
Attorney General	Brian Andre Doyle
Colonial Secretary	H.W. Davidson
Financial Secretary	E.R. Bevington
Source: Fiji Elections, Pacific Islands Monthly
