= 1956 Fijian general election =

General elections were held in Fiji in August 1956; voting took place in the Eastern constituencies between 11 and 18 August, and on 18 August in all other constituencies.

== Electoral system ==
The Legislative Council consisted of 32 members, including 16 'official' members who were civil servants, fifteen 'unofficial' members (five Europeans, five Fijians and five Indo-Fijians), and the Governor sitting as President of the Council.

For Europeans and Indo-Fijians, three of the five representatives were elected from single-member constituencies, with the other two appointed by the Governor. All five Fijian members were appointed from a list of ten candidates submitted by the Great Council of Chiefs.

Voting for Europeans remained restricted to men aged 21 or over who had been born to European parents (or a European father and was able to read, speak and write English), who were British subjects and had been continuously resident in Fiji for 12 months, and who either owned at least £20 of freehold or leasehold property or had an annual income of at least £120. For Indo-Fijians, eligibility was also restricted to men aged 21 or over. They had to be a British subject or from British India, have lived continuously in the Fiji for at least two years, be able to read or write in English, Gujarati, Gurmukhi, Hindi, Tamil, Telugu or Urdu, and for the previous six months, have either owned property with an annual value of five years, had a net annual cash income of at least £75, or held a Government or municipal licence worth at least £5 annually.

== Campaign ==
The elections were boycotted by the Muslim community in protest at not having an elected seat reserved for them. The community was instead represented by one of the two Indo-Fijian nominated members. The Fiji Muslim League requested its members not to participate in the elections in any form, whilst the Muslim Association of Fiji advised Muslims not to accept nomination to the Council.

All candidates were offered two slots on FBC radio.

== Results ==
Constituency	Candidate	Votes	%	Notes
European members
Eastern	Harold Brockett Gibson	281		Re-elected
Eastern	Fred Archibald	169		
Northern and Western	Maurice Scott	Unopposed		Re-elected
Southern	John Falvey	502		Re-elected
Southern	James Burton Turner	167		
Indo-Fijian members
Eastern	James Madhavan	1,041		Re-elected
Eastern	Jamnadas Kanji	866		
Northern and Western	Ayodhya Prasad	2,718		Re-elected
Northern and Western	K. S. Reddy	1,348		
Northern and Western	Chattur Singh	1,240		
Northern and Western	B. D. Lakshman	109		
Northern and Western	D. S. Prasad	40		
Northern and Western	Informal votes	63	–	
Southern	Vishnu Deo	1,900		Re-elected
Southern	Odin Ramrakha	1,423		
Southern	Hari Charan	14		
Southern	Informal votes	64	–	
Source: Fiji Elections, Pacific Islands Monthly

=== Nominated members ===
Europeans
Stanley Cowled
William Granger Johnson
Fijians
Edward Cakobau
George Cakobau
Kamisese Mara
Semesa Sikivou
Lala Sukuna
Indo-Fijians
Andrew Deoki
A. R. Manu
Source: Fiji Elections

== Aftermath ==
Following the elections, Lala Sukuna was appointed as the first Speaker of the Legislative Council.

A. H. Sahu Khan, leader of the Muslim Association of Fiji, replaced A. R. Manu as one of the nominated Indian members in 1957. After Maurice Scott was appointed Speaker following the death of Sukuna in May 1958, a by-election was held in the European Northern and Western constituency, in which Ronald Kermode defeated Mark White by seven votes.
