= 1959 Fijian general election =

General elections were held in Fiji in September 1959, the last in which women and ethnic Fijians were still barred from voting. Voting took place in the Eastern constituencies between 5 and 12 September, and in the Northern and Western and Southern constituencies on 12 September.

== Electoral system ==
The Legislative Council consisted of 32 members, including 16 'official' members who were civil servants, fifteen 'unofficial' members (five Europeans, five Fijians and five Indo-Fijians), and the Governor sitting as President of the Council.

For Europeans and Indo-Fijians, three of the five representatives were elected from single-member constituencies, with the other two appointed by the Governor. All five Fijian members were appointed from a list of ten candidates submitted by the Great Council of Chiefs.

Voting for Europeans remained restricted to men aged 21 or over who had been born to European parents (or a European father and was able to read, speak and write English), who were British subjects and had been continuously resident in Fiji for 12 months, and who either owned at least £20 of freehold or leasehold property or had an annual income of at least £120. For Indo-Fijians, eligibility was also restricted to men aged 21 or over. They had to be a British subject or from British India, have lived continuously in the Fiji for at least two years, be able to read or write in English, Gujarati, Gurmukhi, Hindi, Tamil, Telugu or Urdu, and for the previous six months, have either owned property with an annual value of five years, had a net annual cash income of at least £75, or held a Government or municipal licence worth at least £5 annually.

== Results ==
Constituency	Candidate	Votes	%	Notes
European members
Eastern	Harold Brockett Gibson	240	58.5	Re-elected
Eastern	Leslie Martin	170	41.5	
Eastern	Informal votes	27	–	
Northern and Western	Ronald Kermode	292	56.7	Re-elected
Northern and Western	James Sinclair White	197	38.3	
Northern and Western	Nathaniel Chalmers	26	5.0	
Northern and Western	Informal votes	20	–	
Southern	John Falvey	462	74.0	Re-elected
Southern	Sergius Tetzner	162	26.0	
Southern	Informal votes	31	–	
Total		1,627	100	
Registered voters/turnout		1,985	82.0	
Indo-Fijian members
Eastern	Vijay R. Singh	864	50.3	Elected
Eastern	Jamnadas Kanji	494	28.8	
Eastern	Muhammed Khan	360	21.0	
Eastern	Informal votes	33	–	
Northern and Western	B. D. Lakshman	2,637	38.4	Elected
Northern and Western	James Madhavan	2,158	31.4	Unseated (Note: Madhavan had been elected in the Eastern constituency in the 1956 elections but contested the Northern and Western seat in 1959.)
Northern and Western	Ayodhya Prasad	2,075	30.2	Unseated
Northern and Western	Informal votes	88	–	
Southern	Andrew Deoki	1,877	58.3	Elected
Southern	K. B. Singh	950	29.5	
Southern	Chambadan Manakadan Gopalan	221	6.9	
Southern	Devendra Pathik	89	2.8	
Southern	Odin Ramrakha	82	2.5	
Southern	Informal votes	76	–	
Total		12,004	100	
Registered voters/turnout		14,069	85.3	
Source: Fiji Elections, Pacific Islands Monthly

=== Nominated members ===
Europeans
Charles Cayzer
John Moore
Fijians
Edward Cakobau
George Cakobau
Penaia Ganilau
Semesa Sikivou
Ravuama Vunivalu
Indo-Fijians
Sathi Narain
A. H. Sahu Khan
Source: Fiji Elections

== Aftermath ==
A by-election was held in the Indian Eastern constituency in 1961, which was won by James Madhavan.
