= 1947 Fijian general election =

General elections were held in Fiji in September 1947. Voting took place in the Northern and Western and Southern constituencies on 20 September, with voting in the Eastern constituency carried out between 15 and 22 September.

== Electoral system ==
The Legislative Council consisted of 32 members, including 16 'official' members who were civil servants, fifteen 'unofficial' members (five Europeans, five Fijians and five Indo-Fijians), and the Governor sitting as President of the Council.

For Europeans and Indo-Fijians, three of the five representatives were elected from single-member constituencies, with the other two appointed by the Governor. All five Fijian members were appointed from a list of ten candidates submitted by the Great Council of Chiefs.

Voting for Europeans remained restricted to men aged 21 or over who had been born to European parents (or a European father and was able to read, speak and write English), who were British subjects and had been continuously resident in Fiji for 12 months, and who either owned at least £20 of freehold or leasehold property or had an annual income of at least £120. For Indo-Fijians, eligibility was also restricted to men aged 21 or over. They had to be a British subject or from British India, have lived continuously in the Fiji for at least two years, be able to read or write in English, Gujarati, Gurmukhi, Hindi, Tamil, Telugu or Urdu, and for the previous six months, have either owned property with an annual value of five years, had a net annual cash income of at least £75, or held a Government or municipal licence worth at least £5 annually.

The ban on civil servants voting in elections was lifted earlier in 1947, although civil servants remained ineligible to run for office. Nominations for candidates closed on 25 August.

== Results ==
Constituency	Candidate	Votes	%	Notes
European members
Eastern	Fred Archibald	182		Elected
Eastern	Harold Brockett Gibson	143		Unseated
Northern and Western	Maurice Scott	295		Elected
Northern and Western	John Percy Bayly	183		
Northern and Western	Informal votes	11	–	
Southern	Amie Ragg	369		Re-elected
Southern	Alport Barker	305		
Southern	Informal votes	5	–	
Indo-Fijian members
Eastern	James Madhavan	499		Elected
Eastern	B. M. Gyaneshwar	350		Unseated
Eastern	J. B. Tularam	83		
Northern and Western	A. D. Patel	1,972		Re-elected
Northern and Western	Chattur Singh	1,106		
Southern	Vishnu Deo	1,056		Re-elected
Southern	Andrew Deoki	516		
Southern	Informal votes	21	–	
Source: Fiji Elections

=== Nominated members ===
Europeans
Hugh Ragg
Sydney Herbert Wilson
Fijians
Edward Cakobau
Joeli Ravai
George Toganivalu
George Tuisawau
Tiale Vuiyasawa
Indo-Fijians
M. S. Buksh
Ami Chandra
Source: Fiji Elections, Pacific Islands Monthly

== Aftermath ==
Ravai resigned from the Legislative Council in June 1950 when he left Fiji, and was replaced by Etuate Mataitini.
