= List of political families in Fiji =

The following is a list of political families in Fiji.

== List ==
NOTE: Most of Fiji's political families listed below are, in fact, related by ancestry or by marriage. The Nailatikau family is a subset of the Cakobau family; both are connected by marriage - as well as by ancestral ties - with the Mara and Ganilau families. Tracing family relationships in Fiji is complicated by the fact that many prominent Fijians do not use family names).

The Bavadra Family (husband-wife)

- Timoci Bavadra - Prime Minister of Fiji (1987)
- Adi Kuini Speed (widow of Timoci Bavadra; Cabinet Minister (1999-2000)

Descendants of Seru Epenisa Cakobau Cakobau was the Fijian monarch who unified the nation in 1871, and ceded it to Britain in 1874. Many twentieth-century politicians are direct descendants of his.

- Great-grandchildren:
  - Ratu Sir Edward Cakobau - Military commander, Deputy Prime Minister (1970s).
  - Ratu Sir George Cakobau - Governor-General of Fiji (1973-1983)
  - Ratu Sir Kamisese Mara (founding father; Prime Minister 1967-1992; President 1993-2000).
  - Ro Lady Lala Mara (2nd cousin and wife of Ratu Sir Kamisese; co-founder of the Soqosoqo ni Vakavulewa ni Taukei); maternal great-granddaughter.
  - Ratu Sir Lala Sukuna (1888-1958 - Fiji's first modern statesman. Soldier, scholar, statesman; Paramount Chief; first indigenous Fijian Speaker of Fiji's Legislative Council (1950s). Maternal great-grandson.
  - Ro Teimumu Vuikaba Kepa (née Tuisaiwau) (maternal great-granddaughter; sister of Ro Lady Lala Mara) - Minister of Education (2001-2006); Member of Parliament and leader of the Social Democratic Liberal Party (2014–present).
- Great-great-grandchildren
  - Ratu Epeli Nailatikau (soldier, diplomat, President of Fiji (2009 — present); previously Deputy Prime Minister (2000-2001), Speaker of the House of Representatives (2001-2006); Minister of Foreign Affairs (2007 - 2008); son of Ratu Sir Edward Cakobau
  - Ratu Tu'uakitau Cokanauto - son of Ratu Sir Edward Cakobau (q.v.), brother of Ratu Epeli Nailatikau (q.v.); Cabinet Minister (2000 - 2001).
  - Ratu Alifereti Finau Mara (son of Ratu Sir Kamisese Mara (q.v.); soldier, leader of the Fijian Association Party and cabinet minister (1990s); Fijian Ambassador to the United Nations).
  - Adi Koila Mara Nailatikau (daughter of Ratu Sir Kamisese Mara (q.v.) and wife of Ratu Epeli Nailatikau; diplomat, cabinet minister (1999-2000), and Senator (2001-2006)
  - Ratu George Cakobau - Senator (2001-2006); son of Ratu Sir George Cakobau (q.v.)
  - Adi Litia Cakobau - Senator (2001-2006) and former Cabinet Minister; daughter of Ratu Sir George Cakobau (q.v.)
  - Adi Samanunu Cakobau-Talakuli - Senator and Cabinet Minister (2006–present) and former High Commissioner to Malaysia; daughter of Ratu Sir George Cakobau (q.v.)
- Great-great-great grandchildren
  - Adi Kuini Speed; widow of Timoci Bavadra (q.v.); Cabinet Minister (1999-2000) (also listed under Bavadra family)
- Sixth-generation descendants
  - Roko Tupou Draunidalo; daughter of Adi Kuini Speed (q.v.); Member of Parliament and President of the National Federation Party.

The Ganilau Family

- Ratu Sir Penaia Ganilau - first President of Fiji (1987-1992); maternal great-grandson of Seru Epenisa Cakobau.
  - Ratu Epeli Ganilau - son of Ratu Sir Penaia; husband of Adi Ateca Mara (daughter of Ratu Sir Kamisese Mara); soldier, co-founder of the Christian Democratic Alliance (1998), Chairman, Great Council of Chiefs (2001-2004), founder of the National Alliance Party (2005).
  - Bernadette Rounds Ganilau - wife of Ratu Rabici Ganilau (son of Ratu Sir Penaia Ganilau); United Peoples Party parliamentarian (2006).

The Khaiyum Family (son - father - father-in-law)

- Aiyaz Sayed-Khaiyum - Attorney General
- Sayed Abdul Khaiyum - Member of Parliament
- Viliame Gavoka - Member of Parliament

The Patel Family 1 (brothers)

- A. D. Patel - founder of the National Federation Party
- R. D. Patel - Speaker of the House of Representatives

The Patel Family 2 (brothers)

- Navin Patel - Member of House of Representatives 1977 - 1987
- Vinod Patel - Member of House of Representatives 1994 - 1999

The Speight Family (father-sons)

- Sam Speight - Cabinet Minister (1990s)
- George Speight - coup leader
- Samisoni Tikoinasau - Member of Parliament

The Singh Family 1 (brothers-son)

- Parmanand Singh - Younger brother - one of the first Indo-Fijian members of the Legislative Council
- Chattur Singh - Elder brother - member of Legislative Council
  - Anand Singh - Parmanand's son - member of House of Representatives and Senate

The Singh Family 2 (half-brothers - nephew)

- James Shankar Singh - elder half-brother of Uday - Alliance Minister, later joined the National Federation Party
- Uday Singh - younger half-brother of James - Alliance Party, one term member of Parliament
  - Vijay R. Singh- Nephew of the brothers - Alliance Minister, later joined the National Federation Party

The Lakshman Family (father - son - grandson)

- B. D. Lakshman -Member of Legislative Council 1940-1944 and 1959-1963
  - Prince Gopal Lakshman - son of B.D. Lakshman - Member of House of Representatives 1999-2006
    - Chaitanya Lakshman - grandson of B D Lakshman - Member of House of Representatives in 2006 and member of multi-party cabinet

The Maharaj Family (father - son)

- James Ramchandar Maharaj - Member of Legislative Council of Fiji in 1929.
  - Navin Maharaj son of James Ramchandar Maharaj - Member of House of Representatives 1987

The Madhavan Family (father - son)

- James Madhavan - member of the Legislative Council of Fiji from 1947 to 1972
  - Shiromaniam Madhavan - son of James was member of the House of Representatives of Fiji from 1992 to 1994.
