= William Granger Johnson =

Fijian businessman and politician

Nominated Member of the Legislative Council
- In office 1944–1947, 1953–1959

Personal details
- Born: 28 July 1900; Suva, Fiji
- Died: 1978 (aged 78); Australia

William Granger Johnson (28 July 1900 – 1978) was a Fijian businessman and politician, serving as a nominated member of the Legislative Council in two spells during the 1940s and 1950s.

== Biography ==
Granger was born in Suva in 1900, the only son of Australian Blance (née Wadeson) and Canadian William Henry "Tavua" Johnson. Growing up, he was given the nickname Tui (chief), becoming known as Tui Johnson. He married Val, with whom he had five children, and also joined the Fiji Defence Force, becoming a lieutenant. In 1930 he was appointed German consul in Fiji.

He went into business and after working at Brown and Joske, he joined W.R. Carpenter in 1937, going on to become managing director. He later served as chairman of the Suva Chamber of Commerce.

Following the 1944 elections, he was appointed to the Legislative Council by Acting Governor John Fearns Nicoll as one of the two nominated European members. In 1945 he was an acting member of the Executive Council, covering for the absent Hugh Ragg. Although he was not reappointed following the 1947 elections, he was nominated to the Legislative Council again in 1953, serving until the 1959 elections. He also served on Suva Town Council, representing the Muanikau ward until retiring in 1955.

Johnson retired in 1970 and moved to Queensland in Australia. He died in Australia in 1978 at the age of 78.
