= Gurkul Primary School =

Coordinates: 17°40′5.58″S 177°24′23.87″E

- Saweni, Lautoka; Fiji

Information
- Type: Private
- Established: 1918
- Principal: Jawahar Nand
- Grades: Class 1 - 8
- Affiliation: Arya Pratinidhi Sabha of Fiji

Gurkul Primary School was the first substantive school for Fiji Indians established in Fiji in 1918. Its establishment, coincided with the formation of the Arya Pratinidhi Sabha of Fiji, the Arya Samaj organisation that manages the school. The school is located at Saweni near Lautoka in the western side of the island of Viti Levu.

In 1916, at the first convention of the Arya Samaj in Fiji, it was decided to establish an Arya Samaj School either in Suva or Lautoka but later that year it was decided to establish the school in Lautoka as the members of the Arya Smaj in that area had shown a greater enthusiasm and collected more funds. The school was completed in 1918 but officially opened by the District Commissioner on 7 November 1919.

Many famous Fiji Indians have taught at the school, including Ami Chandra, Ayodhya Prasad, B. D. Lakshman and Kundan Singh Kush. In the late 1920s and early 1930s, students from the school were sent to India to pursue further education.

In the 1970s a secondary school was also built at the site and in 2005 the University of Fiji was also established at the same location.
