= K. B. Singh =

Fijian politician (1905–1979)

Kunwar Bachint Singh

Member of Legislative Council for Southern
- In office 1932–1937
- Preceded by: Vishnu Deo
- Succeeded by: Vishnu Deo

Nominated Indian Member of the Legislative Council
- In office 1937–1947

Member of the Executive Council
- In office 1946–1947

Personal details
- Born: 1905 British India
- Died: 1979 (aged 73–74) Suva, Fiji
- Profession: Teacher

Kunwar Bachint Singh OBE (1905 – 1979) was an Indo-Fijian teacher and politician. He arrived in Fiji in 1927 as a teacher for the Arya Samaj but his association with Vishnu Deo led him to play an active role in aggressively promoting the Arya Samaj and finally into politics. He was elected into the Legislative Council as a protégé of Vishnu Deo but after the election took an independent stance opposed to the wishes of the majority of the Indo-Fijians. He supported nominated rather than elected representation, actively supported the war effort and even attempted to set up a farmers union opposed to a number of existing unions. The Government rewarded him for his loyalty by nominating him into the Legislative Council three times, appointing him as a Justice of the Peace and as the first Indo-Fijian member of the Executive Council.

== Early life ==
Singh was born in 1905 in Punjab in British India. He was educated at Nadalon village high school, before joining the civil service and moving to Delhi. He moved to Singapore to study accountancy, before moving to Fiji in 1927 as a teacher and taught at Viti School near Nausori. He worked hand-in-hand with Vishnu Deo, in June 1930, to establish the Fiji Indian Labour Union to represent unemployed Punjabi immigrants.

== Political career ==
In the build-up to the 1932 elections, Indo-Fijian leader Vishnu Deo needed a candidate to oppose a rebel candidate who had nominated for a seat in the Legislative Council against the call for boycott from Vishnu Deo and other leaders, K. B. Singh was an obvious choice. He was regarded as a loyal supporter of Vishnu Deo and common roll. K.B.Singh defeated his opponent for the Southern Indian Division, capturing 79 percent of the formal votes cast.

On 14 October 1932, under the guidance of Deo, Singh put forward a motion for common roll. The Governor convinced him that his fears were unfounded and asked him to withdraw the motion so that he could discuss it with the Secretary of State. Contrary to Deo's advice, he withdrew the motion. In February 1933, the Secretary of State informed the Legislative Council that it was impracticable to have common roll. Singh resigned and was re-elected in the subsequent by-election with an increased majority over the same rival with Deo's support. However, he took his seat in the Legislative Council, contrary to Deo's instructions and evaded the common roll issue, which led to him being denounced in public meetings organised by Deo and his associates. On 23 March 1934, Singh introduced another motion for common roll which was defeated but its consequence was that new motion could not be introduced immediately after next election.

Fully aware that he would not be able to retain his seat in the next election, Singh accepted the Governor's advice and moved a motion calling for members of the Legislative Council to be nominated and not elected. The motion was passed, but the Colonial Office implemented a compromise, combining election and nomination. The Legislative Council was increased to 31, made up of 15 unofficial members, made up of 5 members from each ethnic group, and 16 official members. All the Fijian seats were to be nominated by the Great Council of Chiefs, but three each of the Indian and European seats were to be elected on communal franchise and the remaining two filled through nomination.

In June 1934 he was made a Justice of the Peace. This had previously been considered an honorary position in Fiji; however, Singh used his new status to request to sit on the bench alongside the magistrate during a court hearing in Naduruloulou. In September 1934 it was reported in Pacific Islands Monthly that he had been refused permission to do so by the District Commissioner, after which he complained to the Governor, and returned to the District Commissioner with instructions from the Governor that he be allowed to sit on the bench. The incident led to the Governor issuing a public clarification that all Justices of the Peace were occasionally invited to sit on the bench, and that Singh had not been snubbed by the District Commissioner.

Singh did not contest the 1937 elections, but was appointed to the Legislative Council by the Governor as one of the nominated members. He ran unsuccessfully against Deo in the 1940 elections, after which he was nominated again by the Governor. In 1940, K.B. Singh supported the Native Land Trust Bill, which gave control of native land to the Native Land Trust Board. In the 1943 debate in the Legislative Council, on the sugar cane dispute, he condemned the rivalry among Indian leaders when B. D. Lakshman asked for a Royal Commission and Vishnu Deo for a Court of Arbitration. He said that," when elephants fight the grass is trampled", pointing out that rivalry among Fiji Indian leaders only harmed the humble farmer. In May 1943, he was commissioned as an officer to raise recruits for the Fiji Labour Corps to support the military effort. With stiff opposition from Vishnu Deo, only 300 Indians joined the military service. In 1944, he proposed the raising of a unit of Fiji Indians to serve in the Indian Army but this was rejected by the British Government.

Singh was nominated to the Legislative Council again following the 1944 elections. In 1946 Singh was appointed to Executive Council, becoming the first Indian to serve in government. During the same year, he also attempted to establish a new union known as the Southern Division Farmers Union. There was widespread opposition to this until Vishnu Deo took over its leadership. Following the 1947 elections, he lost his place in the Legislative Council. He was made an OBE in the 1948 Birthday Honours.

Singh made several subsequent attempts to get back into the Legislative Council as an elected member, losing to Andrew Deoki in the 1959 and 1963 elections, and by K. C. Ramrakha in the 1966 election.

He died in Suva in 1979 at the age of 77.
