= Alport Barker =

Fijian newspaper owner and politician (died 1956)

Member of the Legislative Council
- In office 1923–1944, 1950–1953
- Constituency: Southern (European)

Personal details
- Born: Akaroa, New Zealand
- Died: 14 June 1956 Auckland, New Zealand
- Profession: Newspaper owner

Sir Thomas William Alport Barker CBE (died 14 June 1956) was a Fijian newspaper owner and politician. He owned the Fiji Times for several decades and was a member of the Legislative Council for over 20 years.

== Biography ==
Barker was born in Akaroa in New Zealand. His family moved to Fiji when he was young and he attended school in Suva. He worked at P.S. Solomon legal firm and was called to the bar, but did not practice law. Instead, he established a newspaper, the Western Pacific Herald in 1901. In 1909 he married Evelyn Turner, daughter of Legislative Council member James Burton Turner; they subsequently had a daughter, Molly. In 1918 Barker bought the Fiji Times, merging it with his other newspaper to form the Fiji Times and Herald. He also controlled the Samoa Herald for several years until 1936. Whilst in the newspaper business, he served as Chairman of the Suva Chamber of Commerce.

Barker was also involved in sport and was President of the Suva Rugby Union for 15 years. He was made a Commander of the British Empire in the 1946 New Year Honours, before being knighted in the 1951 New Year Honours.

After his wife died on 27 November 1951, he returned to New Zealand. He remarried in 1952, but died on 14 June 1956 in Auckland aged 82.

=== Political career ===
Barker ran for election to the Legislative Council in the Southern constituency in the 1923 elections and defeated John Linn Hunt. He was returned unopposed in the 1926 elections and was re-elected in 1929, 1932 (unopposed), 1937 (unopposed) and 1940, before losing his seat to Amie Ragg in the 1944 elections. He ran for office again in the 1947, but failed to unseat Ragg. However, in the 1950 elections he defeated Ragg by 134 votes to return to the Legislative Council. He did not contest the 1953 elections.

During his time in the Legislative Council he became a member of the Executive Council. He was also elected to Suva Town Council in January 1949, and served as Chairman of the Town Board for three years. He was mayor of the city on five occasions.

Alongside John Percy Bayly, he campaigned for ethnic Fijians to be given the franchise, travelling to the UK at his own expense to make the case to the British authorities.
