= Sadanand Maharaj =

Indo-Fijian politician (died 1962)

Sadanand Maharaj MBE JP

Member of the Executive Council
- In office 1950–1953

Nominated Member of the Legislative Council
- In office 1950–1953

Personal details
- Died: 8 April 1962 Suva, Fiji

Sadanand Maharaj (died 8 April 1962) was an Indo-Fijian politician. He served as a member of the Legislative Council and Executive Council between 1950 and 1953.

== Biography ==
Maharaj was the son of Badri Maharaj, the first Indo-Fijian member of the Legislative Council. In the late 1930s he moved to Wairuku in Rakiraki District. A keen scout, he was a scout commissioner in his district.

He contested the Indian Northern & Western seat in the 1940 elections, but was defeated by B. D. Lakshman by 1,010 to 447 votes. Following the 1950 elections, he was appointed to the Legislative Council as one of the two Indo-Fijian nominees by Governor Brian Freeston, and also became a member of the Executive Council, serving on both until 1953. He also served on the Agricultural Advisory Committee for several years and as a Justice of the Peace. In the 1959 Birthday Honours he was made an MBE for public service.

He died in Suva on 8 April 1962 at the age of 59 . (Note: Alison Mahraj paternal granddaughter taken from fathers birth certificate.)
