= 1940 Fijian general election =

General elections were held in Fiji on 20 July 1940.

== Electoral system ==
The Legislative Council consisted of 32 members, including 16 'official' members who were civil servants, fifteen 'unofficial' members (five Europeans, five Fijians and five Indo-Fijians), and the Governor sitting as President of the Council.

For Europeans and Indo-Fijians, three of the five representatives were elected from single-member constituencies, with the other two appointed by the Governor. All five Fijian members were appointed from a list of ten candidates submitted by the Great Council of Chiefs.

Voting for Europeans remained restricted to men aged 21 or over who had been born to European parents (or a European father and was able to read, speak and write English), who were British subjects and had been continuously resident in Fiji for 12 months, and who either owned at least £20 of freehold or leasehold property or had an annual income of at least £120. For Indo-Fijians, eligibility was also restricted to men aged 21 or over. They had to be a British subject or from British India, have lived continuously in the Fiji for at least two years, be able to read or write in English, Gujarati, Gurmukhi, Hindi, Tamil, Telugu or Urdu, and for the previous six months, have either owned property with an annual value of five years, had a net annual cash income of at least £75, or held a Government or municipal licence worth at least £5 annually.

In both ethnic categories, civil servants were barred from voting.

== Results ==
Constituency	Candidate	Votes	%	Notes
European members
Eastern	Harold Brockett Gibson	95	41.5	Re-elected
Eastern	William Edmund Willoughby-Tottenham	62	27.1	
Eastern	William Carlisle Baker	56	24.5	
Eastern	Patrick Costello	16	7.0	
Northern and Western	Hugh Ragg	Unopposed		Re-elected
Southern	Alport Barker	320	63.4	Re-elected
Southern	Amie Ragg	185	36.6	
Indo-Fijian members
Eastern	J. B. Tularam	127	42.5	Re-elected
Eastern	Jafar Khan	92	30.8	
Eastern	Sadhu Lal	80	26.8	
Northern and Western	B. D. Lakshman	1,010	69.3	Elected
Northern and Western	Sadanand Maharaj	447	30.7	
Southern	Vishnu Deo	783	68.1	Re-elected
Southern	K. B. Singh	366	31.9	
Source: Fiji Elections, Fiji Royal Gazette 1940

=== Nominated members ===
Europeans
Henry King Irving
John Trotter
Fijians
G.W. Lalabalavu
Lala Sukuna
George Toganivalu
George Tuisawau
Tiale Vuiyasawa
Indo-Fijians
Said Hasan
K. B. Singh
Source: Fiji Royal Gazette 1940
