= 1963 Fijian general election =

General elections in Fiji held during 17 April and 4 May 1963

General elections were held in Fiji between 17 April and 4 May 1963. For the first time, women and indigenous Fijians were given the right to vote alongside the male European and Indo-Fijian population.

== Electoral system ==
Constitutional amendments in June 1962 saw significant changes to the composition to the Legislative Council, which had remained unchanged since 1937. The Council was expanded from 33 to 37 members, of which 19 were 'official' members (usually heads of Government departments) and 18 'unofficial' members, 12 of whom were elected.

Of the 12 elected members, there were four Fijians and four Indo-Fijians elected from single member constituencies, with four Europeans elected from three seats, with the Southern constituency electing three members. Some people could choose between ethnic rolls and no provision was made for Rotumans, Pacific Islanders, Chinese and part-Chinese to vote. Voting was still limited to literate people. The Governor nominated a further two members from each of the three communities, with the Fijians being chosen from a list provided by the Great Council of Chiefs. The Legislative Councillors of each race were permitted to select two of their members to the Executive Council.

There was also a number of changes to qualifications for candidates to run for office. Indian and European civil servants were prohibited from nominating as candidates, but this provision did not apply to Fijians as there were few qualified Fijians outside the civil service. Candidates were required, not only to be eligible to be registered as a voter, but to be actually registered. This provision disqualified Ayodhya Prasad as he was out of the country during the registration period.

Voter registration took place between 1 July and 30 September 1962, with 52,935 Fijians, 36,137 Indians and 4,526 Europeans registering.

== Campaign ==
Most candidates contested the election as independents, although the Citizens Federation (which became the Federation Party in 1964) endorsed A. D. Patel, Sidiq Koya and James Madhavan, while the Kisan Sangh endorsed Deo Sharma, James Shankar Singh and Harsih Chandra Kohli respectively as their opponents. The Western Democratic Party nominated Apisai Tora and Isikeli Nadalo, both for the Western Fijian Constituency. Isikei Nadalo was also endorsed by Fijian National Party.

== Results ==
There were two significant outcomes of the elections; the secret ballot amongst Fijians led to the consolidation of the power of the Fijian establishment, notably in the Western Fijian Constituency, where the Tovata high chief, Ratu Penaia Ganilau won by 7,347 votes against local commoners Apisai Tora (1,496 votes) and Isikeli Nadalo (659 votes). In the Indian community, voters in the sugar cane districts clearly endorsed the policies of the Federation led by A.D. Patel over those of the Kisan Sangh, by electing its three candidates; A.D. Patel defeated Deo Sharma by 6,244 votes to 3,346 votes, S.M. Koya defeated James Shankar Singh by 3,998 votes to 3,480 votes and James Madhavan defeated Harish Chandra Kohli by 2,753 vote to 2,175 votes.

Constituency	Candidate	Votes	%	Notes
European seats
Northern (876 registered)	Fred Archibald	358		Elected
Northern (876 registered)	Harold Brockett Gibson	341		Unseated
Northern (876 registered)	Informal votes	38	–	
Southern (969 registered)	John Kearsley	388		Elected
Southern (969 registered)	Douglas Walkden-Brown	375		
Southern (969 registered)	Archibald Gardner	25		
Southern (969 registered)	Informal votes	29	–	
Suva (1,634 registered)	John Falvey	Uncontested		Re-elected
Western (1,047 registered)	Ronald Kermode	573		Re-elected
Western (1,047 registered)	Samuel Berwick	296		
Western (1,047 registered)	Informal votes	12	–	
Fijian seats
Central	Semesa Sikivou	10,152		Elected
Central	Livai Volavola	2,600		
Central	A. Waqabaca	228		
Central	Informal votes	257	–	
Eastern	Ravuama Vunivalu	Unopposed		Elected
Northern	Kamisese Mara	Unopposed		Elected
Western	Penaia Ganilau	7,347		Elected
Western	Apisai Tora	1,496		
Western	Peniame Naqasima	1,434		
Western	Isikeli Nadalo	659		
Western	William Toganivalu	197		
Western	Informal votes	1,189	–	
Indo-Fijian seats
Northern	James Madhavan	2,753		Re-elected
Northern	Harish Chandra Kohli	2,175		
Northern	Informal votes	76	–	
Northern Viti Levu	Sidiq Koya	3,998		Elected
Northern Viti Levu	James Shankar Singh	3,480		
Northern Viti Levu	Informal votes	50	–	
Southern	Andrew Deoki	3,722		Re-elected
Southern	K. B. Singh	2,778		
Southern	Ram Lochan Regan	1,220		
Southern	Chandra Prakash Bidesi	1,174		
Southern	A. R. Sahu Khan	498		
Southern	Informal votes	223	–	
Western	A. D. Patel	6,244		Elected
Western	Deo Sharma	3,346		
Western	M. Singh	72		
Western	Informal votes	92	–	
Source: Meller & Anthony, Fiji Elections, Pacific Islands Monthly

=== Nominated members ===
Europeans
Cyril Aidney
John Moore
Fijians
George Cakobau
Edward Cakobau
Indo-Fijians
C. A. Shah
C. P. Singh
Source: Pacific Islands Monthly

== Aftermath ==
=== By-elections ===
Following the elections, the result in the Northern European constituency (where Fred Archibald had defeated Harold Brockett Gibson) was challenged on the basis that Archibald was 'not of sound mind' and therefore ineligible to be a candidate; Archibald had previously been certified in January 1958 when he had sought treatment for mental health issues; although he had returned to normal life, the certificate had not been cancelled due to an oversight. Following the issue being raised by the challenger, the certificate was cancelled on 11 June.

Although the petition was initially dismissed as having been lodged outside the required time limit, in August the Attorney General asked the Supreme Court to declare the seat vacant. This was done by the Acting Chief Justice on 26 August, and a by-election was called for November. Archibald went on to defeat Gibson by 399 votes to 301 in the by-election, and was readmitted to the Legislative Council.

Following the death of Eastern Fijian MLC Ravuama Vunivalu in April 1964, Josua Rabukawaqa was elected as his replacement.

=== New Executive Council ===
In July 1964 a reorganised Executive Council was formed, consisting of 11 members. Seven of the members held ministerial portfolios, three of which were members of the Legislative Council.

Position	Member
Attorney-General	Justin Lewis
Colonial Secretary	P.D. Macdonald
Development Commissioner	W.B. Rogers
Financial Secretary	H.P. Ritchie
Secretary for Fijian Affairs	A.C. Reid
Minister for Communications and Works	John Falvey
Minister for Natural Resources	Kamisese Mara
Minister for Social Services	A. D. Patel
Members	Penaia Ganilau
Members	Ronald Kermode
Members	James Madhavan
Source: Pacific Islands Monthly
