= Andrew Deoki =

Fijian politician

The Honourable Andrew Indar Narayan Deoki OBE

23rd Attorney General of Fiji
- In office 1979–1981
- Monarch: Elizabeth II
- Governor General: Ratu Sir George Cakobau
- Prime Minister: Ratu Sir Kamisese Mara
- Preceded by: Vijay R. Singh
- Succeeded by: Manikam Pillai

Member of the Senate
- In office 1979–1981

Member of the Legislative Council of Fiji
- In office 1959–1966
- Preceded by: Vishnu Deo
- Constituency: Southern Indo-Fijian

Nominated Member of the Legislative Council of Fiji
- In office 1956–1959

Personal details
- Born: 1917 Fiji
- Died: 12 June 1985 (aged 67–68) Gosford, Australia
- Profession: Lawyer

Andrew Indar Narayan Deoki OBE (1917 – 12 June 1985) was an Indo-Fijian statesman who served his community as a social and religious leader, soccer administrator, member of the Legislative Council and Senate in independent Fiji and as Attorney General.

== Biography ==
Born in Suva, the son of prominent community leader Nandan Sen Deoki, Deoki attended the University of Auckland and spent seven years in New Zealand qualifying as a lawyer before returning to Fiji in 1941, going on to become a solicitor and barrister, earning admittance to the bar and Supreme Court of New Zealand, Victoria and Queensland. He was also a member of the Methodist Church.

=== Soccer administration ===
Deoki served two terms as President of the Fiji Indian Football Association, from 1951 to 1953 and from 1955 to 1958. He was responsible for the establishment of the Fiji Secondary Schools Soccer Association which took competitive soccer to high school students. He was the manager of the first Fiji team to tour overseas, managing the 1961 tour of New South Wales. He was one of the first administrators to propose opening up football to all races in Fiji, and despite opposition from some quarters, the word Indian was removed from Fiji soccer’s governing body to form the Fiji Football Association in August 1961. He subsequently became a life member of the Football Association, and was also a president of the Fiji Lawn Tennis Association.

=== Political career ===
Deoki first contested elections in 1947, when he ran for the Southern Indo-Fijian constituency in the Legislative Council elections, losing to Vishnu Deo. Following the 1956 elections he was appointed to be one of the two Indo-Fijian nominated members of the Council.

He ran for election again in the Southern constituency in 1959 and was elected with 59% of the vote. He realised that being a Christian (who made up a tiny proportion of Indo-Fijian community), he needed to maintain good relations with all sections of the Indian community, and consequently his nomination paper for the 1963 elections was signed by two Hindus, a Muslim, a Gujarati, a South Indian and a Sikh; he was re-elected.

In 1964, the Governor proposed the appointment of Deoki into the Executive Council. However, A. D. Patel objected to this, stating that “Deoki was uncooperative with him and his group” and threatened to resign as Member for Social Services. The Governor backed down and instead appointed Patel ally, James Madhavan.

In December 1964, the Governor asked each ethnic group to select its own delegates to the 1965 London Constitutional Conference. A.D. Patel nominated himself, James Madhavan, C. A. Shah and Sidiq Koya, all members of the Federation Party. The Governor stated that the Federation group did not represent all Indian political opinion in Fiji and accepted Deoki's proposal that all 18 unofficial members of the Legislative Council attend. At the Conference, while the Federation members insisted on common roll, the ethnic Fijian and European members wanted the status quo to be maintained. Deoki proposed a compromise whereby 12 seats (four from each of the ethnic groups) were elected on communal roll, 18 were elected from cross-voting seats, 6 Fijians, 6 Indians, 3 Europeans and one each from Chinese, Rotumans and Pacific Islanders, and the remaining 6 seats were to be elected on a common roll. Neither proposal was accepted, and instead the Conference decided on 25 communal seats (9 Fijians, 9 Indians and 7 Europeans), 9 cross-voting seats (three for each ethnic group) and two Fijians nominated by the Great Council of Chiefs. When the constitutional framework for Fiji was debated in the Legislative Council in December 1965, Deoki voted with the four Federation members against the new constitution.

Determined to defeat Deoki in the 1966 elections, the first to be held by universal suffrage, Patel and the Federation Party nominated Irene Jai Narayan, a teacher. Patel considered that a female candidate, a novelty at the time, would have a better chance of unseating the well-connected Deoki. The ploy succeeded: Narayan beat Deoki by 5,676 votes to 2,779 votes. Deoki was subsequently appointed Vice Chairman of the Sugar Advisory Board, which did not please Patel as Deoki was based in Suva and had little knowledge of the sugar industry.

He was awarded an OBE in the 1971 New Year Honours for his contribution to politics and sport in Fiji. In the 1972 elections he ran again as an independent candidate and received around 10% of the vote. In the same year he was appointed Director of Public Prosecutions, holding the post until emigrating to Brisbane in 1976. He returned to Fiji in 1979 when he was appointed Attorney General and was nominated to the Senate by Prime Minister Kamisese Mara. He resigned in 1981 and returned to Australia.

He died in Gosford in Australia in June 1985 at the age of 68.
