= Brahmanand Raghvanand =

Indo-Fijian civil servant

Nominated Member of the Legislative Council
- In office 1953–1955

Personal details
- Profession: Civil servant

Brahmanand Raghvanand MBE was an Indo-Fijian civil servant. He served as a member of the Legislative Council in the 1950s.

== Biography ==
Raghvanand was the son of Badri Maharaj, the first Indo-Fijian member of the Legislative Council. He was educated in Fiji and New Zealand. He became a leader of the Arya Samaj in the 1920s, but was forced to resign from the organisation by the Governor and Colonial Secretary and closely monitored for several years afterwards. During World War II he was one of the Indian members elected to the Central War Committee.

Raghvanand worked in the colonial civil service and became Assistant to the Native Lands Commissioner Lala Sukuna, the first non-European to hold principal office. In 1944 he was elected to the council of the Fiji Public Servants' Association. In the 1952 Birthday Honours he was made an MBE for his service. In 1953 Raghvanand was appointed to the Legislative Council by the Governor as one of the 'official' members. He retired in 1955.

In 1963 he was made a Justice of the Peace. He died at the age of 87.
