= Fiji Samachar =

Hindi-language newspaper published in Fiji

Fiji Samachar फिजी समाचार
- Type: Newspaper
- Owner(s): Indian Printing and Publishing Company
- Founded: 1924
- Ceased publication: 1974
- Language: Hindi
- City: Suva

Fiji Samachar (Fiji News) was a Hindi language newspaper published in Fiji from 1924 to 1974. It was published in Suva by the Indian Printing and Publishing Company and its first editor was Babu Ram Singh.

== History ==
The newspaper started as a bi-lingual Hindi and English Monthly newspaper but from 1935 became a weekly Hindi newspaper. The editorial committee was headed by Pandit Vishnu Deo and included Pandit Ami Chandra and Pandit Gopendra Narayan Pathik, all active members of the Arya Samaj in Fiji and consequently the newspaper was seen as the mouthpiece of the Arya Samaj. In the 1930s Vishnu Deo became the editor.

The newspaper was involved in a number of controversies. In 1927, the newspaper was sued for making allegations against some Fiji Indian civil servants, with Ram Singh and Vishnu Deo being charged but the charges were withdrawn after a public apology arranged by S. B. Patel. In 1932, Deo was convicted of publishing objectionable material against the religious practices of others in the newspaper.

In early 1943, the Fiji Government suspended the publication of Fiji Samachar for six months after it published record of the meeting of Central Indian Was Committee in November 1942, in which most of the speakers took the view that Indians could not be expected to enlist for the army unless they were paid the same as Europeans.

The Fiji Samachar enjoyed wide readership during the period from 1929 to 1959 when Vishnu Deo was active in politics, but lost its readers to numerous other Hindi language newspapers which began publication in the 1960s. In 1963 the newspaper was sold to S. M. Bidesi and labour problems caused it to cease publication in 1974.
