= Harold Brockett Gibson =

New Zealand-born Fijian solicitor and politician.

Member of the Legislative Council
- In office 1937–1947
- Preceded by: John Maynard Hedstrom
- Succeeded by: Fred Archibald
- Constituency: Eastern (European)
- In office 1950–1963
- Preceded by: Fred Archibald
- Succeeded by: Fred Archibald
- Constituency: Eastern (European)

Member of the House of Representatives
- In office 1966–1972
- Preceded by: Seat created
- Constituency: Northern (General Electors)

Personal details
- Born: New Zealand
- Died: 31 May 1975 (age 77) Labasa, Fiji
- Party: Independent, Alliance Party
- Profession: Solicitor

Harold Brockett Gibson OBE (died 31 May 1975) was a New Zealand-born Fijian solicitor and politician. He served as a member of the Legislative Council and House of Representatives in three spells between 1937 and 1972. He also represented Fiji in the lawn bowls competition at the 1950 British Empire Games.

== Biography ==
Gibson was born in New Zealand and qualified a lawyer in 1919. He moved to Fiji in 1926 and settled in Labasa, where he worked as a solicitor. He was also involved in business, and served as a director of Eastern Hotels and the Labasa Electricity Company.

Gibson represented Fiji in lawn bowls at the 1950 British Empire Games, competing in the Men's Fours.

He was married to Vera and the couple had a daughter named Fay.

=== Political career ===
Gibson contested the Eastern constituency of the Legislative Council in the 1937 elections and defeated incumbent MLC William Edmund Willoughby-Tottenham. He was re-elected in 1940 (again defeating Willoughby-Tottenham), and was returned unopposed in the 1944 elections. Although he lost his seat to Fred Archibald in the 1947 elections, he defeated Archibald in the 1950 elections. Gibson was re-elected again in 1953, defeating both Archibald and Willoughby-Tottenham. In the 1956 New Year Honours he was made an OBE for public services. The elections later in the year saw him elected ahead of Archibald again.

Gibson was re-elected in 1959, but defeated by his old rival Archibald in the 1963 elections. In the 1966 he returned to unseat Archibald in the Northern General electors seat. Although he ran as an independent, he later joined the Alliance Party. He retired at the 1972 elections.

Gibson was also a member of Labasa Township Board, and served for one term as its chairman.
