= Amie Ragg =

Fijian engineer, civil servant and politician

Member of the Legislative Council
- In office 1944–1950
- Preceded by: Alport Barker
- Succeeded by: Alport Barker
- Constituency: Southern (European)

Personal details
- Born: 7 October 1878
- Died: 5 September 1957 (aged 78); Suva, Fiji
- Profession: Engineer, civil servant

Amie Augustus Ragg ISO AMICE (7 October 1878 – 5 September 1957) was a Fijian engineer, civil servant and politician. He served as a member of the Legislative Council between 1944 and 1950.

== Biography ==
Ragg was born in Fiji and initially worked as a marine engineer before becoming a mechanical engineer. In 1901 he married Florence Fretheway; the couple had three children, two sons and one daughter. In middle age he joined the Department of Public Works, and after studying for the AMICE certification, he rose to become director of the department. He retired in 1938, and was awarded the Imperial Service Order the following year.

Ragg contested the Southern seat in the 1940 Legislative Council elections, but was beaten by the incumbent Alport Barker. However, in the 1944 elections he unseated Barker, becoming an MLC alongside his younger brother Hugh. He was re-elected in 1947, but lost to Barker in the 1950 elections.

He died in September 1957 at the age of 78.
