= Hugh Ragg =

Fijian businessman and politician

Member of the Legislative Council
- In office 1926–1937
- Preceded by: Henry Lamb Kennedy
- Succeeded by: Seat abolished
- Constituency: Northern (European)
- In office 1937–1947
- Preceded by: Seat created
- Succeeded by: Maurice Scott
- Constituency: Northern & Western (European)

Nominated Member of the Legislative Council
- In office 1947–1950

Personal details
- Born: 26 January 1882 Suva, Fiji
- Died: 24 May 1963 (aged 81) Suva, Fiji
- Profession: Businessman

Sir Hugh Hall Ragg (26 January 1882 – 24 May 1963) was a Fijian businessman and politician. He served as a member of the Legislative Council between 1926 and 1950.

== Biography ==
Ragg was born in Suva in 1882, the third son of Hugh Hall Ragg. He was educated at the Marist Brothers School in Suva. He worked in business for much of his life, working for firms including Brodziak & Co and Brown & Joske, before setting up his own company, H.H Ragg & Co, which he sold to Morris Hedstrom. He owned several racehorses and served as secretary of the Ba Amateur Turf Club. His first wife, Emma Dora Petrie, with whom he had eight children, died in the 1918 flu epidemic. He subsequently married Adrienne McMillian in 1920.

In his mid-50s he bought a hotel in Lautoka and established the Northern Hotels company. Working with his son David, the company built hotels in Ba, Nadi, Rakiraki and Sigatoka during the 1950s. Their Korolevu Beach Hotel, built in 1953, was the first resort in Fiji.

He was knighted in the 1947 New Year Honours.

=== Political career ===
Ragg contested the Northern constituency in the 1926 Legislative Council elections, unseating the incumbent Henry Lamb Kennedy to become a Member of the Legislative Council (MLC). He was returned unopposed in the 1929 and 1932 elections. When the number of elected European seats was reduced from six to three prior to the 1937 elections, he ran in the Northern and Western seat against fellow incumbent John Percy Bayly, winning by 54 votes. Ragg was returned unopposed again in 1940 and defeated Bayly for a second time in the 1944 elections.

Prior to the 1947 elections Ragg announced that he would not run for re-election. However, he was chosen as one of the two nominated European members for another term. During his time in the Legislative Council, he served in the Executive Council between 1945 and 1954, and was also member of the Town Boards of both Ba and Lautoka. His older brother Amie was also an MLC.

He died at his home in the Tamavua area of Suva in May 1963. His funeral was described by Pacific Islands Monthly as "probably the biggest ever seen at Suva."
