= Tiale Vuiyasawa =

Fijian chief, civil servant and politician

Member of the Senate
- In office 1970–1973
- Succeeded by: Josaia Tavaiqia

Nominated Member of the Legislative Council
- In office 1938–1950, 1952–1958

Personal details
- Died: March 1981 Suva, Fiji

Ratu Tiale Wimbledon Thomas Vuiyasawa (died March 1981) was a Fijian chief, civil servant and politician. He served as a member of the Legislative Council and Senate.

== Biography ==
Vuiyasawa was born into a chiefly family, the second son of Joni Madraiwiwi I and Litiana Maopa after Lala Sukuna, and the uncle of future Prime Minister Kamisese Mara. He attended school in Levuka before completing his education at Wesley College in Melbourne. In 1916 he enlisted in the New Zealand army, joining the 4th Maori Reinforcements. After serving in Egypt and France with the Pioneer Battalion, he was transferred to the Rarotongan Company who were in Palestine.

Returning to Fiji in 1919, he joined the civil service, becoming Native Assistant Commissioner for Lomaiviti in 1933. In 1937 he became Roko Tui of Ra Province. In the same year, he was one of the ten members put forward by the Great Council of Chiefs for the Governor to choose five nominated members of the Legislative Council. Although he was not chosen, when Penijamini Veli died the following year, Vuiyasawa was selected as his replacement. He was reappointed to the council following elections in 1940 and 1944.

In 1945 Vuiyasawa became Roko Tui of Ba Province, before being appointed Roko Tui of Cakaudrove Province two years later. He was appointed to the Legislative Council again following the 1947 elections. Although he was not reappointed after the 1950 elections, he rejoined the Council in 1952 as a replacement for Edward Cakobau after he resigned. In 1957 he was appointed to Suva City Council for a year after the resignation of Mikaele Dreu.

When the Senate was established at independence in 1970, he was one of the eight members appointed by the Great Council of Chiefs, serving until 1973. He died in March 1981 at the age of 85.
