= 1932 Fijian general election =

General elections were held in Fiji on 31 August 1932, although only one of the nine elected seats was contested.

== Electoral system ==
The Legislative Council consisted of thirteen appointed Civil Servants, nine elected members (six Europeans and three Indo-Fijians) and three Fijians appointed from a list of between four and six potential candidates presented to the Governor by the Great Council of Chiefs. The Governor also sat in the Council as its President.

Voting for Europeans was restricted to men aged 21 or over who had been born to European parents (or a European father and was able to read, speak and write English), who were British subjects and had been continuously resident in Fiji for 12 months, and who either owned at least £20 of freehold or leasehold property or had an annual income of at least £120. A total of 1,533 Europeans (127 in Eastern, 259 in Northern, 750 in Suva, 254 in Vanua Levu & Taveuni and 143 in Western) were registered to vote.

For Indo-Fijians, eligibility was also restricted to men aged 21 or over. They had to be a British subject or from British India, have lived continuously in the Fiji for at least two years, be able to read or write in English, Gujarati, Gurmukhi, Hindi, Tamil, Telugu or Urdu, and for the previous six months, have either owned property with an annual value of five years, had a net annual cash income of at least £75, or held a Government or municipal licence worth at least £5 annually. A total of 1,585 Indo-Fijians (140 in Eastern, 669 in Northern & Western and 776 in Southern) were enrolled.

In both ethnic categories, civil servants were barred from voting.

== Campaign ==
Between the 1929 elections and the 1932 elections, the leader of the Indo-Fijian community Vishnu Deo had been convicted of an offence and was barred from running for election. The community decided to nominate only two candidates for the three seats, with no-one running in the Eastern Division.

In the European seats, the only candidates were the sitting Council members, resulting in all six being returned unopposed.

== Results ==
Constituency	Candidate	Votes	%	Notes
European members
Eastern	John Maynard Hedstrom	Unopposed		Re-elected
Northern	Hugh Ragg	Unopposed		Re-elected
Southern	Henry Milne Scott	Unopposed		Re-elected
Southern	Alport Barker	Unopposed		Re-elected
Vanua Levu & Taveuni	William Edmund Willoughby-Tottenham	Unopposed		Re-elected
Western	John Percy Bayly	Unopposed		Re-elected
Indo-Fijian members
Eastern	No nominations received			
Northern and Western	Muniswamy Mudaliar	Unopposed		Elected
Southern	K. B. Singh	341	78.8	Elected
Southern	Narbahadur Singh	92	21.2	
Southern	Informal	38	–	
Source: Ali

=== Nominated members ===
Role	Member
Governor	Murchison Fletcher (until May 1936), Arthur Richards (from November 1936)
Attorney-General	Ransley Thacker (from March 1934)
Colonial Secretary	Cecil Barton (from December 1936)
Commissioner of Lands	Frederick Raymond Charlton (from October 1935)
Comptroller of Customs	John Murchie Wilson
Director of Agriculture	Henry Walter Jack
Director of Education	James Russell (from September 1934)
Director of Medical Services	Alexander Hugh Blaxell Pearce
Director of Public Works	W. Wise
Inspector-General of Constabulary	J.S. Gamble
Postmaster-General	P.F. Boyd (until July 1936), William Frederick Hayward (from October 1936)
Secretary for Indian Affairs	Victor William Tighe McGusty (from June 1936)
Secretary for Native Affairs	Hugh Claud Monckton
Treasurer	John Craig
Fijian members	Lala Sukuna
Fijian members	Deve Toganivalu
Fijian members	Popi Seniloli
Source: Fiji Blue Book for the Year 1936

== Aftermath ==
After the Legislative Council was opened, the Indo-Fijian members put forward another proposal for a common roll. It had been planned that both elected members would resign after the proposal was rejected, but Northern and Western member Muniswamy Mudaliar refused to give up his seat. Southern Division member K. B. Singh did resign and was re-elected in a by-election the following year, winning by a larger margin. The by-election was boycotted by the Muslim community, who were demanding their own reserved seat.

1933 Southern Division by-election
Candidate	Votes	%
K. B. Singh	382	93.9
Narbahadur Singh	25	6.1
Informal votes	31	–
Total	438	100
Source: Ali
