= Chattur Singh =

Indo-Fijian politician

Member of the Legislative Council for Northern & Western
- In office 1937–1940
- Preceded by: Muniswamy Mudaliar
- Succeeded by: B. D. Lakshman

Personal details
- Born: Ba, Fiji
- Profession: Law clerk, Landlord

Chandersen Chattur Singh was an Indo-Fijian politician. He caused a major sensation in the 1937 elections when he defeated A. D. Patel, a well known lawyer and political ally of Vishnu Deo.

== Early Political Activities ==
Chattur Singh was one of the first Indo-Fijians to take an active interest in politics. He opposed the Residential Tax Legislation (poll tax) of 1922, which imposed an annual tax of one pound on all Fiji residents between the ages of 18 and 60, by refusing to pay the tax. The court ordering his bicycle to be sold to pay for the tax. In the early twenties he formed the Young Men’s Indian Association of Lautoka, which in 1926 asked for an Indian member to be nominated again to the Legislative Council and Badri Maharaj was re-nominated. Singh had been an early supporter of common roll and on a visit overseas in 1929, put the case for Fiji Indians to H.S.L. Polak, the Secretary for the Indians Overseas Association. In the 1929 elections his brother Parmanand was one of the first Indo-Fijians elected to the Council. In 1931, he appealed to Jawaharlal Nehru for help for the Fiji Indians in their fight for common roll.

== The 1937 election ==
In the 1937 election, Singh decided to contest the Northern and Western Indian Division against A.D. Patel. Singh was a law clerk (for Lautoka lawyer, Douglas Charmers) while Patel was an accomplished lawyer and had the support of Vishnu Deo. Chattur Singh used an ingenious technique to fight the election. He used the Fiji Indian’s dislike of Gujarati traders and money lenders, and the fact that A.D. Patel was an India-born Gujarati, to turn the election to one between Fiji-born and India-born. Together with Ayodhya Prasad and other young men he organised a secret organisation called the New Youth Army. Singh won the election by 671 votes to Patel's 651 with 66 votes being invalid.

== Political decline ==
Later in 1937, when the Kisan Sangh was formed, its members were mainly those who had supported Singh in the election campaign. Aware of the power of the Colonial Sugar Refining Company, Singh soon distanced himself from the Kisan Sangh. He claimed to represent the mill workers and farmers in their struggle for better remuneration, but without a political base, did not have enough support to contest the next election in 1940 elections. During the Second World War, he supported the war effort and had his son enlisted in the army. In the 1947 elections Singh challenged the incumbent, A.D. Patel, and lost by 1,972 votes to 1,106. He attempted another comeback in 1956, losing to Ayodhya Prasad in a five-way race.
