= Sydney Herbert Wilson =

Fijian politician (1886–1971)

Nominated Member of the Legislative Council
- In office 1947–1950

Personal details
- Born: 1886 Levuka, Fiji
- Died: November 1971 (aged 85) Savusavu, Fiji

Sydney Herbert Wilson MBE (1886 – November 1971) was a Fijian planter and politician. He served as a member of the Legislative Council between 1947 and 1950.

== Biography ==
Born in Levuka, Wilson was a planter in the Savusavu area, where he had two plantations named Naseva and Oneva. He became president of the local Planter's club, and was elected chairman of the Union of Copra Producers in 1947.

Later in the same year he was appointed to the Legislative Council as one of the two European nominated members, serving until 1950.

Wilson was made an MBE in the 1951 Birthday Honours. He died in Savusavu in November 1971 at the age of 85.
