= Penijamini Veli =

Fijian chief, civil servant and politician

Nominated Member of the Legislative Council
- In office 1937–1938
- Succeeded by: Tiale Vuiyasawa

Personal details
- Born: 1874
- Died: 27 August 1938 (aged 64)

Ratu Penijamini Veli (1874 – 27 August 1938) was a Fijian chief, civil servant and politician. He served as a member of the Legislative Council from 1937 until his death the following year.

== Biography ==
Born in 1874, Veli joined the constabulary service in the mid-1890s. In 1898 he took over responsibility for road building in his district and went on to build over 250 km of bridal track. In 1902 he visited the United Kingdom as part of the entourage of Adolph Brewster that attended the coronation of Edward VII. He became a sub-inspector of native constabulary in 1906, before being appointed Roko Tui of Macuata Province in 1909. Although he later retired, he was subsequently reappointed to the post. He visited the United Kingdom again in 1924 as part of a tour to commemorate the fiftieth anniversary of the establishment of the Colony of Fiji.

The Legislative Council was reconstituted prior to the 1937 elections to have five Fijian nominated members, who were chosen by the Governor from a list of ten submitted by the Great Council of Chiefs. Veli was one of the ten nominated, and subsequently one of the five chosen by Governor Arthur Richards. In April 1938 he was awarded a Certificate of Honour by the Governor.

He died in August 1938 at age 64.
