= Mataitini =

Mataitini is a surname. Notable people with the surname include:

- Etuate Mataitini (1887–1967), Fijian chief and politician
- Joni Mataitini (1865–1934), Fijian chief and politician
