= A. R. Sahu Khan =

Indo-Fijian civil servant and politician

Nominated Member of the Legislative Council
- In office 1944–1947

Personal details
- Died: 1979 (aged 78) Suva, Fiji

Abdul Rahman Sahu Khan JP (died 1979) was an Indo-Fijian civil servant and politician. He served as a nominated member of the Legislative Council between 1944 and 1947.

== Biography ==
Sahu Khan joined the Fijian civil service, working as a law clerk. Following the outbreak of World War II, he was one of the Indo-Fijian members elected to the colony's Central War Committee in 1942. In 1944 he became a founding board member of the Fiji Public Servants' Association.

After the July 1944 elections, he was appointed to the Legislative Council by Acting Governor John Fearns Nicoll as one of the two nominated Indo-Fijian members. He later became a member of the National Federation Party. He served in the Council until 1947, and in 1950 he was made a justice of the peace. He later became president of the Muslim Association of Fiji. He contested the 1963 Legislative Council elections in the Southern constituency, but received only 498 votes and lost his deposit.

Sahu Khan's brother Abdul Habib also served as an MLC between 1957 and 1963. He died in Suva in 1979 at the age of 78, survived by his wife and eight children.
