= Arya Samaj in Fiji =

AUM or OM is considered by the Arya Samaj to be the highest and most proper name of God.

The Arya Samaj was the first religious, cultural and educational Fiji Indian organisation established in Fiji. From its inception, in 1904, it attracted the young, educated and progressive Hindus into its fold. During the first three decades of the twentieth century, it was the sole voice of the Indian community in Fiji and as Fiji Indians won political rights, it was not surprising that first Indian members of the Legislative Council were all Arya Samajis. The influence of Arya Samaj over the Indians in Fiji gradually waned as other organisations representing Indians were established but it remained the dominant force in politics until 1959. The modern day Arya Samaj in Fiji still speaks out on issues affecting its members and its activities are visible through the numerous educational institutions that it manages.

== History of Arya Samaj in Fiji ==
As far back as 1893, learning centres had been established by small groups of people who had organised themselves into Samajs. With the arrival of Shiu Datt Sharma from India, in 1902, a temple was established in Samabula, near Suva, which also acted as a school attended by about 60 boys and girls.

A person who had a profound influence on the establishment of Arya Samaj in Fiji was a 22-year-old man from Punjab, Behari Lal, who while on his way to Argentina via Australia, stopped over in Fiji. He found employment at the Navua Sugar Mill, but visited Suva regularly where people interested in the teachings of Swami Dayanand Saraswati gathered at the residence of Mangal Singh. Lal had a copy of the Satyarth Prakash in the Urdu language from which he read and explained portions to the congregation every Sunday.

It was this small group of Fiji Indians who included Mangal Singh, Gaji Pratap Singh, Nanku Sonar, Bihari Lal, Shiu Datt Sharma, Basdeo Rai, Inayat Hussein, Indra Narayan and Tikaram Verma, who met in Samabula on 25 December 1904 to form the Arya Samaj of Fiji. This was due to their desire to maintain their heritage and provide a platform for lifting their living standard and the inspiration they received from the teaching of Swami Dayanand Saraswati, the founder of Arya Samaj.

== Early activities of Arya Samaj ==
Arya Samaj’s work in Fiji received a boost with the arrival of Arya Samaj Missionary from India, Swami Ram Manoharanand Saraswati, who arrived in Fiji from Burma in 1913. Totaram Sanadhya, although himself a Sanatani, has written about the early contribution of Arya Samaj to providing education and religious education in Fiji and asked for them to send more educators to Fiji.

An Arya Samaji gentleman by the name of Ram Manoharanand Sarasvati went and he preached there, therefore these words of thanks. There is a very great need for this sort of religious instructor there, who knows Vedic principles and knows English as well.... We know that Arya Samaj is doing a lot of work, but aren't these givers of aid to the world, the Arya Samaj, able to send one more religious instructor to Fiji, for the benefit of our foreign-dwelling brothers?

The Arya Samaj appealed to those who wanted to build a revitalised Hinduism in Fiji suitable to the local conditions. Badri Maharaj, who built the first school for Indians in Fiji in 1898 was an Arya Samaji and so was the first Indian Lawyer to arrive in Fiji, Manilal Doctor, who had been involved in Arya Samaj in Mauritius and believed that Arya Samaj was the best sect for the individualized Indians in Fiji. The first school was built by Arya Samaj in Fiji was the Gurukul Primary School in Saweni, Lautoka in 1918.

== Educational and Religious Activities ==
Following the establishment of this school a great renaissance took place amongst Indo-Fijians to educate their children. This was supported by the arrival from India of a number of teachers, some of whom were Ami Chandra, Kundan Singh Kush and Kunwar Bachint Singh. Between 1926 and 1929 more than 100 Indo-Fijian boys and girls were sent to India to study at various Arya Samaj institutions. In the early thirties, Arya Samaj was the best organised of any Indo-Fijian organisation. It also had as its leader, Vishnu Deo and the only Hindi language newspaper in Fiji, Fiji Samachar. The Arya Samaj aggressively promoted its teaching and openly attempted to gain converts from Muslims. Arya Samaj activities in Fiji reached a peak with the arrival of another missionary, Shri Krishna Sharma from India. Conflict soon developed with Indian Christians, Muslims, South Indians and even Sanatanis who had initially supported the Arya Samaj through Hindu Sangsthans. There were debates on religious issues, but when Vishnu Deo was convicted and fined for an article in the Fiji Samachar, things quietened down.

== Educational and Political Leadership in Fiji ==
The Arya Samaj, henceforth, concentrated on its educational activities and built numerous educational institutions. Arya Samajis continued to provide leadership to the Indo-Fijians and until the 1960s most Indo-Fijian leaders were either Arya Samajis or those with close links to the Arya Samaj in Fiji. Some who served on the Legislative Council were Badri Maharaj, Vishnu Deo, Parmanand Singh, Chattur Singh, Ayodhya Prasad, Ami Chandra, K. B. Singh and Vijay R. Singh. Some Arya Samaji members of Parliament since independence have been Vijay R. Singh, Dr. Ganesh Chand, Kamlesh Kumar Arya, Surendra Prasad, Anand Singh and Davendra Singh.

== Arya Samaj of Fiji spreads Overseas ==
As Indo-Fijians have migrated overseas, they have taken their religion and culture with them Consequently, Arya Samajs have been established in a number of countries by former Indo-Fijians. The following are links to the Web Sites of some of these:

- Auckland Arya Samaj
- Arya Samaj of Australia
- Victoria Arya Samaj (Australia)
- Arya Pratinidhi Sabha of Fiji

== See also ==
- Arya Pratinidhi Sabha of Fiji
