= Jasper Garnett =

Fijian chief and politician

Nominated Member of the Legislative Council
- In office 1944–1947

Personal details
- Born: 1889; Fiji
- Died: 23 October 1951 (aged 62); Suva, Fiji

Jasper Adrian Garnett (1889 – 23 October 1951) was a Fijian farmer. He served as a member of the Legislative Council between 1944 and 1947.

Born in Fiji in 1889, he became a farmer in Tailevu. He chaired the Rewa Co-operative Dairy and was a freemason. In 1944 he was nominated by the Governor to become a member of the Legislative Council, serving until 1947. He died in Suva in October 1951 at the age of 62.

Garnett was married and had three children.
