= A. R. Manu =

Fijian politician (died 1957)

Nominated Member of the Legislative Council
- In office 1956–1957
- Succeeded by: A. H. Sahu Khan

Personal details
- Born: Fiji
- Died: 29 March 1957 (aged 48) Lautoka, Fiji

Abdul Rahman Manu (died 29 March 1957) was an Indo-Fijian businessman politician. He served as a nominated member of the Legislative Council from 1956 until his death in 1957.

== Biography ==
Born in Fiji, Manu owned a business and sugar cane farm in Lautoka District.

He was one of the founding members and president of the Maunatul Islam Association, an organisation representing Muslims who originally came to Fiji as indentured labourers from Kerala in South India. He was also an active member of the Society for the Prevention of Cruelty to Animals in Lautoka.

Following the 1956 elections, he was nominated as one of the Indo-Fijian members of the Legislative Council. Following his death the following year, A. H. Sahu Khan was nominated as his replacement.
