= Ravuama Vunivalu =

New Zealand-born Fijian solicitor and politician

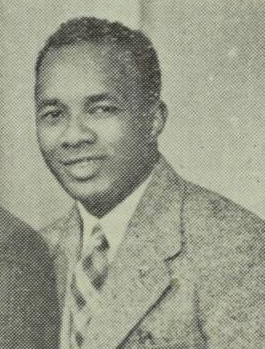
- Vunivalu in 1947

Member of the Legislative Council
- In office 1963–1964
- Succeeded by: Josua Rabukawaqa
- Constituency: Eastern (Fijian)

Nominated Member of the Legislative Council
- In office 1950–1954, 1959–1963

Personal details
- Died: 7 April 1964 (aged 42) London, United Kingdom
- Profession: Civil servant

Ravuama Vunivalu (died 7 April 1964) was a Fijian civil servant and politician. He served as a member of the Legislative Council in two spells between 1950 and his death in 1964.

== Biography ==
After excelling at school, Vunivalu won a scholarship from the Morris Hedstrom fund to study at the University of Auckland, and was only the second Fijian to earn a Bachelor of the Arts after Lala Sukuna. He won a second scholarship in 1948 to attend a postgraduate course in economics at St John's College, Cambridge. He returned to work for the civil service, which he had originally joined in 1938.

In 1950 Vunivalu was appointed as one of the five Fijian members of the Legislative Council. However, he resigned in 1954 in order to join the First Battalion of the Fiji Infantry Regiment to fight communist forces in Malaya. He returned to Fiji in 1956 and rejoined the civil service, becoming secretary of the Education Department.

Vunivalu was appointed to the Legislative Council again in 1959. Fijians were given the vote for the first time in the 1963 elections, with Vunivalu returned unopposed in the Eastern Fijian constituency.

He died during a trip to London in April 1964 at the age of 42. He was married twice, first to Faranisese Baboboa and later to Asilina Davila.
