= John Trotter (Fijian politician) =

Australian-Fijian politician (died 1954)

Nominated member of the Legislative Council
- In office 1938–1944

Personal details
- Died: 28 July 1954 Auckland, New Zealand

John Trotter (died 28 July 1954) was an Australian businessman who worked for Burns Philp in Tonga and Fiji for over 30 years. He served as a member of the Legislative Council of Fiji between 1938 and 1944.

== Biography ==
After graduating from Hawkesbury Agricultural College, Trotter moved to Tonga in 1913 to set up the Tonga Agricultural College. The following year he went to France to fight in World War I, returning to Tonga in 1918 to become manager of the Haʻapai branch of Burns Philp.

In 1933 Trotter moved to Levuka in Fiji, before relocating to Suva three years later, where he became general manager of Burns Philp in the territory. In 1938 he was appointed to the Legislative Council to replace John Maynard Hedstrom, remaining a member for six years.

Trotter retired from Burns Philp in June 1953 and moved to New Zealand. He died in Auckland in July 1954 at the age of 66, leaving a widow and two daughters.
