= Etuate Mataitini =

Fijian chief and politician

Nominated Member of the Legislative Council
- In office –1950

Vunivalu of Rewa

Personal details
- Born: 1887
- Died: 17 November 1967 (aged 79–80) Suva, Fiji

Ratu Etuate Navakamocea Mataitini (1887 – 17 November 1967) was a Fijian chief and politician. He was Vunivalu of Rewa, and a member of the Legislative Council.

== Biography ==
Mataitini was a member of the Great Council of Chiefs for over thirty years. He also served as a nominated member of the Legislative Council for several years until 1950.

He died in Suva in November 1967 at the age of 79. He was married three times, and had 13 children.
