= Deve Toganivalu =

Fijian chief and politician

Roko Tui of Bua
- In office 1909–1928
- Succeeded by: George Toganivalu

Nominated Member of the Legislative Council
- In office 1926–1938

Personal details
- Born: 1864
- Died: 21 February 1939 (age 75)

Ratu Deve Toganivalu ISO (1864 – 21 February 1939) was a Fijian chief and politician. He was Roko Tui of Bua from 1909 until 1928 and a member of the Legislative Council between 1926 and 1938.

== Biography ==
Born in 1864, Toganivalu started his career in 1880 as a clerk in Levuka. In 1888 he joined the civil service as a Native Tax Inspector. He later became the Governor's Matanivanua and a Native Stipendiary Magistrate. He resigned from the civil service in 1927.

On 1 January 1909 Toganivalu became Roko Tui of Bua, a role he held until being succeeded by his son George Toganivalu in 1928. During his tenure, Bua gained a reputation as being the best-run and most traditional province of the territory. He became a nominated member of the Legislative Council in 1926, and was appointed a Companion of the Imperial Service Order in the 1928 Birthday Honours. He resigned from the Legislative Council in 1938 and was replaced by G.W. Lalabalavu. He died in February 1939.
