= Kundan Singh Kush =

Thakur Kundan Pal Singh Kush
- Born: 1881; Muzaffarnagar, Uttar Pradesh, India
- Died: 1967 (aged 85–86); Lautoka, Fiji
- Education: Teacher training and Vedic scholar
- Occupations: Teacher, Missionary
- Spouse: Shiwa Bai
- Children: Usha, Uma, Narendra

Thakur Kundan Pal Singh Kush (1881–1967) was an Arya Samaj missionary and teacher who arrived in Fiji, from Muzaffarnagar, Uttar Pradesh, India in 1928. He first taught at the Dharamshala School in Nausori where he later became the founding Head Teacher of Vunimono Arya School in 1929. He taught in a number of Arya Samaj schools which included Gurukul Primary School near Lautoka in 1939, Arya Samaj Girls' School in Saweni, Lautoka, from 1940 to 1945, Swami Shraddanand Memorial School in Suva, Vunikavikaloa Arya School in Ra, and Veisari Primary School near Suva.

The Arya Samaj Centenary Publication, celebrating the 100th anniversary of the formation of the Arya Samaj, made the following statement about the abilities of Kush:

Thakur Kundan Kush came to Fiji in 1928 as a teacher, served the Arya Samaj with distinction. He conducted debates and lectured ably. His logic and method of presentation of arguments were really very marvellous and worthy of remark.

The Fiji Government, however, was so worried about his activities that it repeatedly inquired into his fitness to teach school children, removed him from control of one school (see below), temporarily suspended his teaching licence and censored his mail, especially his imports of Arya Samj literature.

Kush was the principal force behind the shuddhi (conversion) and sangathan (religious unions) efforts. On 29 June 1930 at a meeting of the Hindu Maha Sabha in Nausori, Kush was elected president. Resolutions passed at the meeting asked Hindus to organize themselves and to adhere to the teachings of the Hindu Dharam regarding diet and to boycott a rival newspaper (Vriddhi). As part of his shuddhi efforts, Kush made house to house visits among isolated Muslims and he with others was labelled as troublemakers by the police.

In the 1930s, Kush was dismissed as a teacher from Samabula Indian School in Suva, and the government took over its management, when Muslim and Christian parents objected to the Arya Samaj influence in the school committee.

Kush followed the principles of the Arya Samaj and supported marriage of widows, himself marrying a widow, Shiwa Bai and had three children: Usha, Uma and Narendra. He continued his religious work in Suva until his death in 1967 in Lautoka.

== See also ==
- Arya Samaj in Fiji
- Arya Pratinidhi Sabha of Fiji
- Hindu Maha Sabha
