= Said Hasan =

Indo-Fijian lawyer and politician

Nominated Member of the Legislative Council
- In office 1937–1944

Personal details
- Born: Punjab Province, British India
- Profession: Lawyer

Said Hasan was an Indo-Fijian lawyer and politician. He served in the Legislative Council between 1937 and 1944.

== Biography ==
Hasan was born in Amritsar Punjab Province in British India and earned a BA at Punjab University. He then moved to the United Kingdom and read law at Gray's Inn and studied for an LLB at the University of London. He was called to the bar in 1915.

After a spell of travelling, Hasan returned to India and worked at the Punjab High Court, as well as lecturing at the University Law College where he became its Vice Principal. He subsequently moved to Zanzibar, where he lived until moving to Fiji for a year in 1931. He then returned to India, before moving back to Fiji in 1934, where he earned a reputation as one of the best lawyers in the country.

In 1936 Hasan was appointed to the Suva Town Board, and the following year he was appointed to the Legislative Council. He also became President of the Fiji Muslim League.
