= John Falvey =

Fijian politician (1916–1990)

The Honourable Sir John Falvey KBE QC

21st Attorney General of Fiji
- In office 1970–1977
- Monarch: Elizabeth II
- Governor General: Ratu Sir George Cakobau
- Prime Minister: Ratu Sir Kamisese Mara
- Preceded by: Justin Lewis
- Succeeded by: Sir Vijay Singh

Minister without portfolio
- In office 20 September 1967 – 1970
- Monarch: Elizabeth II
- Governor: Sir Derek Jakeway; Sir Robert Foster; Until 10 October 1970
- Chief Minister: Ratu Sir Kamisese Mara; Until 10 October 1970

Member for Communications and Works
- In office 1963–1966
- Monarch: Elizabeth II
- Governor: Sir Kenneth Maddocks; Sir Derek Jakeway
- Preceded by: None (new office)
- Succeeded by: Charles Stinson

Member of the Legislative Council of Fiji
- In office 1963–1972

Senator of Fiji
- In office 1972–1979
- Appointed by: Prime Minister of Fiji
- President of the Senate: Sir Robert Munro

Personal details
- Born: John Neil Falvey; 16 January 1918 New Zealand
- Died: 13 January 1990 (aged 71) Suva, Fiji
- Citizenship: Fijian citizenship (from 1970)
- Party: Alliance Party
- Profession: Lawyer

Sir John Neil Falvey KBE QC (16 January 1918 – 13 January 1990) was a New Zealand-born Fijian lawyer, who served as Attorney General of Fiji from 1970 to 1977. Previously, he had served as legal adviser to the Fijian Affairs Board.

== Early life ==
Born in New Zealand on 16 January 1918, Falvey was the son of John and Adela Mary Falvey. He was educated at Whangarei High School, where he was head boy in his final year, and earned a university entrance scholarship with the eighth-highest marks in the national Junior Scholarship examinations. He went on to study at the University of Otago, from where he graduated with a Bachelor of Arts degree on 9 May 1939. An all-round sportsman, Falvey was awarded university blues in cricket, golf, and rugby union.

Following the outbreak of World War II, Falvey was commissioned as an officer in the New Zealand Army in 1939, and the following year was attached to the Colonial Service and posted to Fiji. He served with the Fiji Military Forces, later transferring to the Gilbert and Ellice Islands. He then moved to the Fiji Secretariat, firstly serving as an administrative officer before becoming district officer, Southern Division.

After the war, Falvey completed his legal studies, graduating with a Bachelor of Laws degree from Auckland University College in 1948. He married Margaret Weatherby, and the couple went on to have six children.

== Early political career ==
Falvey served as a member of the Legislative Council of Fiji in the 1960s.

In January 1963, Falvey signed what became known as the Wakaya letter, a document drawn up by the Great Council of Chiefs, which asserted the principle of ethnic Fijian paramountcy. This became the basic negotiating document of the Alliance Party (supported predominantly by ethnic Fijians and by Europeans) in the 1960s.

Following the 1963 elections, the first-ever held by universal suffrage, Governor Sir Derek Jakeway introduced the member system as a first step towards responsible government, which followed four years later. Three members of the Legislative Council (Ratu Sir Kamisese Mara, Dr A. D. Patel, and Falvey himself) were made members of the Executive Council of Fiji and appointed to oversee government departments. They were not "ministers" in the modern cabinet sense: they were a minority within the Executive Council, and although responsible to the Legislature, they were merely advisers to the Governor, who retained complete executive power. Falvey was appointed Member for Communication and Works, with responsibility covering meteorology, postal services, civil aviation, tourism, transport and hotels He served until 1966.

With the introduction of responsible government on 20 September 1967, Falvey was made a Minister without portfolio, meaning that he had no fixed responsibilities, but had a vote in the Cabinet and was assigned ad hoc tasks from time to time by Ratu Mara, who was now the Chief Minister of Fiji. He held this office until 1970

== Attorney General ==
In 1970, when Fiji became an independent Dominion as the Dominion of Fiji, Falvey was appointed Attorney-General by the Prime Minister, Ratu Mara. In the 1972 elections, the first since independence in 1970, the number of General electors representatives (representing ethnic minorities) in the House of Representatives was reduced from the ten they had been allocated in the former Legislative Council to eight; of these, only three were elected on a closed communal roll. Falvey did not contest this election, but was appointed to the Senate of Fiji as one of six nominees of the Prime Minister. After retiring as Attorney General, Falvey remained in the Senate until 1979, and chaired several Senate committees.

== 1987 constitutional review commission ==
Following the first of two military coups, Governor-General Ratu Sir Penaia Ganilau appointed Falvey to chair a constitutional review commission. The commission was to begin hearings on 6 July, and deliver its recommendations to the Governor General by 31 July. Its terms of reference were to "strengthen the representation of indigenous Fijians, and in so doing bear in mind the best interests of other peoples in Fiji." The Commission received 860 written and 120 oral submissions, and produced a report recommending a new unicameral legislature comprising 36 Fijians (28 elected and 8 appointed by the Great Council of Chiefs), 22 Indo-Fijians, 8 General electors, 1 Rotuman, and up to four nominees of the Prime Minister. National constituencies, ethnically allocated by elected by universal suffrage, were to be abolished, and all voting was to be communal. The Prime Minister's post was to be reserved for an indigenous Fijian.

After a second military coup on 25 September that year, and the appointment of Ganilau as first President of a newly proclaimed republic, the government submitted the recommendations of the Falvey Commission to a review committee chaired by Paul Manueli, a former Commander of the Fijian military. Some adjustments were made, and the outcome was the 1990 Constitution, which entrenched indigenous Fijian dominance.

== Other activities ==
Falvey's interests included golf, and in 1978, he was president of the Fiji Golf Association.

== Death ==
After a long illness, Falvey died in Suva on 13 January 1990, three days before his 72nd birthday. His wife, Margaret, Lady Falvey, died in Waikanae, New Zealand, in 2025, aged 102.

Government offices
Preceded by	Member for Communications and Works; 1963–1966	Succeeded by
Preceded by	Minister without portfolio 1967–1970	Succeeded by
Political offices
Preceded by	Member of the Legislative Council of Fiji; 1963–1972	Succeeded by
Preceded by	Senator of Fiji; 1972–1979	Succeeded by
Legal offices
Preceded by Justin Lewis	Attorney General of Fiji; 1970–1977	Succeeded by Sir Vijay Singh
