= B. D. Lakshman =

Indo-Fijian sugar industry person

Brahma Dass Lakshman

Member of the Legislative Council
- In office 1959–1963
- Preceded by: Ayodhya Prasad
- Succeeded by: Seat abolished
- In office 1940–1944
- Preceded by: Chattur Singh
- Succeeded by: A. D. Patel
- Constituency: Northern and Western

Personal details
- Born: 1900 Waila, Fiji
- Died: 5 October 1981 (aged 80–81) Brisbane, Australia
- Profession: Businessman, trade unionist

Brahma Dass Lakshman (1900 – 5 October 1981) was an Indo-Fijian politician, trade unionist and businessman, who had a considerable influence on Fiji’s sugar industry. He served in the Legislative Council in two spells between 1940 and 1963.

== Education and teaching career ==
Born in the village of Waila near Nausori in 1900, he was educated in Fiji before travelling to India in 1927 to attend university. He graduated from Banaras Hindu University with a BA degree. While in India, he took part in the independence struggle with Mahatma Gandhi and was jailed for four months. When Indian Prime Minister Indira Gandhi later visited Fiji, she presented a copper plate to Lakshman's family to honour his contribution. On his return to Fiji he established a high school in Gurukul on behalf of the Arya Samaj. In 1939, after some differences with the school committee he left the school and moved into Lautoka town and opened a night school, Gandhi Memorial College.

While in Lautoka he met leaders of the Kisan Sangh and offered his services to the sugar cane farmers’ union. Between 1940 and 1943 he represented the Kisan Sangh in negotiations with the Colonial Sugar Refining Company and in numerous discussions with the government. He also contested the 1940 elections to the Legislative Council with the endorsement of the Kisan Sangh, as the sitting member, Chattur Singh, had lost its confidence. He stood for the Northern and Western constituency against Sadanand Maharaj, also a member of the Kisan Sangh, and won easily with just under 70% of the vote.

Following the elections, he became a key advisor to Ayodhya Prasad during the 1943 cane strike as the Kisan Sangh and Maha Sangh vied to support from the farmers. When the Kisan Sangh split into left and right wings, he allied himself with the right wing led by Ayodhya Prasad but had secret meetings with members of the left wing. The split led to the left wing of the Kisan Sangh and Maha Sangh nominating A. D. Patel to run against him in the 1944 elections; Patel won with 77% of the vote.

In 1953, differences arose between Prasad and Lakshman, who was now the Vice President of the Kisan Sangh, regarding payment to the Fijian landowners to obtain land to construct a building for the Kisan Sangh. Lakshman was expelled from the Kisan Sangh and subsequently involved himself with organising the sugar mill workers. He became the President of the Fiji Industrial Workers Congress following the death of Ami Chandra in 1954 and was responsible for the gold mine workers strike of June 1955.

In the 1956 elections he ran against Prasad, but received only 109 votes. However, in 1958 he was elected to Lautoka Town Council with the support of the local ratepayers association. After the departure of Sidiq Koya from the Central Committee of the Kisan Sangh, Muslim supporters of the organisation were alienated. They supported Lakshman in the 1959 elections, in which he defeated Prasad. In the same year he was elected president of the Fiji Trades Union Congress. He did not contest the 1963 elections and although He put up his name for a number of other elections, he did not launch a serious campaign and remained out of politics for most of the rest of his life.

Having ventured into business, he establish a firm that manufactured buttons from mother-of-pearl shells and became involved in land deals. He died in Brisbane in October 1981 at the age of 81.
