= James Madhavan =

Fijian politician (1915–1973)

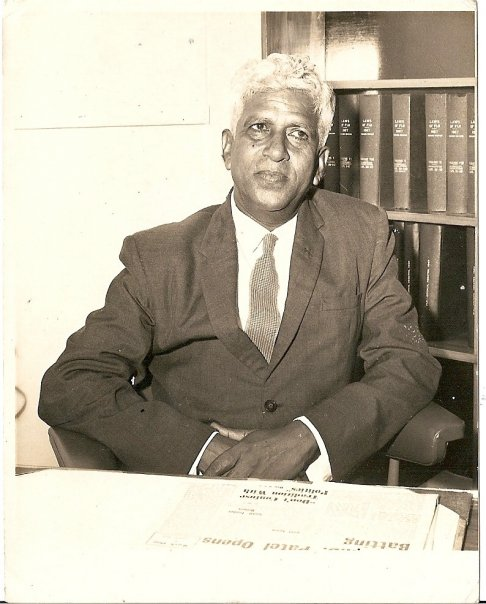

Member of the House of Representatives
- In office 1970–1972
- Constituency: North-East Vanua Levu
- In office 1972–1973
- Succeeded by: Sarvan Singh
- Constituency: Savusavu–Macuata East

Member of the Legislative Council
- In office 1947–1959
- Preceded by: B. M. Gyaneshwar
- Succeeded by: Vijay R. Singh
- Constituency: Eastern (Indo-Fijian)
- In office 1961–1963
- Preceded by: Vijay R. Singh
- Constituency: Eastern (Indo-Fijian)
- In office 1963–1966
- Constituency: Northern
- In office 1966–1970
- Constituency: North-East Vanua Levu

Member of the Executive Council
- In office 1950–1956, 1964–1966

Personal details
- Born: Fiji
- Died: 20 December 1973 Fiji
- Party: Federation Party, National Federation Party
- Spouse: Eunice Madhavan
- Profession: Teacher, Trade Unionist

James Madhavan (died 20 December 1973) was an Indo-Fijian politician. He was a member of the Legislative Council and House of Representatives for most of the period between 1947 and 1973 and had two spells in the Executive Council.

== Biography ==
Madhavan initially was a primary school teacher but when the Maha Sangh sugar cane farmers' union was formed in Labasa, he was one of its earliest members. Unlike in Viti Levu where it was mainly supported by South Indians, the Maha Sangh in Labasa had support from a wide cross-section of the Indo-Fijian community. He became the leader of Maha Sangh in Vanua Levu and when the organisation split into two opposing factions, he registered a new association known as the Vanua Levu Farmers Union. He also remained an active member of the Fiji Teachers Union and was its president in the 1950s and early 1960s, retiring from the position in 1967.

Madhavan used his status to gain election to the Legislative Council and was elected to the legislature in the Eastern Indo-Fijian constituency in 1947. After being elected, he allied himself with A. D. Patel against Vishnu Deo. When Patel lost his seat in the 1950 elections Madhavan was selected as the Indian representative in the Executive Council. He remained in the Legislative Council until losing his seat in the 1959 elections, when he changed constituencies. However, he returned to the Legislative Council after being re-elected in his previous constituency in a 1961 by-election.

He contested the 1963 elections under the banner of Citizens Federation, together with Patel and Sidiq Koya. All three won convincingly and went on to form the Federation Party in 1964. In the same year he was appointed to the new Executive Council. After being re-elected in 1966 he was appointed Deputy Speaker.

Madhavan died in December 1973 at the age of 58. His son Shiromaniam was also a politician.
