= Badri Maharaj =

Fijian politician

Member of Legislative Council (Fiji) Indian nominated member
- In office 1916 – 1923; 1926 - 1929

Personal details
- Born: 1868 Bamoli village, near Rudraprayag Uttarakhand, India.
- Died: Unknown
- Profession: Farmer

Badri Maharaj was an Indo-Fijian farmer, politician, and philanthropist. He was born as Badri Dutt Bamola however took on the surname Maharaj at some time after arriving in Fiji. He was the first Indian member of the Legislative Council serving for two periods between 1916 and 1923 and 1926 to 1929 as a nominated member, but he was not a popular choice for Fiji Indians, who preferred the lawyer, Manilal Doctor to be their representative. Despite his unpopularity, he was a man of principle and resigned from the Council in protest at what he believed was an unfair imposition of poll tax on the Fiji Indian people. He proposed an innovative system of Indian administration (panchayat) and showed himself to be ahead of his time by opposing child marriage and promoting education.

== Contribution to education ==
He was born in 1868 in Bamoli village, near Rudraprayag in the state of Uttarakhand, India, in which he ran away from the village when he was 12 and went to Agra. He came to Fiji as an indentured labourer in 1889. He was the first Fiji Indian to realise the need for schools for Indians and at his own expense founded the Wairuku Indian School, near Rakiraki, in 1898, making it the first Fiji Indian school to be established in Fiji. One of the famous Fijians to attend the school was not an Indian but Ratu Sir Lala Sukuna, regarded by many as the father of modern Fiji.

== Member of Legislative Council ==
In 1916, when it was decided to nominate an Indian to the Legislative Council, Badri Maharaj was given the honour. This choice was not popular with the Fiji Indians, who wanted Manilal Doctor, a lawyer, as their representative rather than a semi-literate farmer. There was considerable opposition to the appointment amongst Fiji Indians, and even Fiji Times suggested, instead, Manilal Doctor or C. F. Andrews, or someone else brought from India be nominated, and urged the Fiji Indians to protest.

=== Proposed panchayat system of administration ===
In 1918, Badri Maharaj suggested the establishment of panchayats as a form of Indian administration. In a letter to the Agent-General of Immigration, he outlined his ideas. He argued that panchayats would simplify the administration of justice amongst the Fiji Indians by hearing cases and arranging quick settlement of disputes. If the parties refused the authority of the panchayat, the matter could be brought before the Court. The proposed panchayat system was to include both Hindus and Muslims to minimise conflict between the two groups. Badri Maharaj saw panchayats as a way to prevent the abuses associated with child marriage and as an authority to deal with all questions relating to Indian customs and religion. He offered to choose members for the panchayats and stated that it would help preserve Indian customs, minimise dissatisfaction and promote greater unity amongst the Fiji Indians. The Agent-General of Immigration agreed that panchayats were a good idea, but after finding out more about its administration in India and other indentured-labour colonies, concluded that no panchayats existed in other indentured-labour colonies, that it was too risky and the time was not right for its introduction.

=== Opponent of child marriage ===
In 1919 the Legislative Council debated amendments to the Marriage Law to recognise religious marriage amongst the Fiji Indians. Badri Maharaj introduced an amendment to raise the legal age for marriage but retain lower age limits of thirteen for girls and sixteen for boys for legal betrothal ceremonies. He explained the Hindu culture regarding marriage at that time but the Legislative Council ignored him and never considered the possibility of granting the Fiji Indians authority to define their law.

=== Supporter of Government policies ===
Madri Maharaj was seen as a "man of character" by the Government but had little following amongst the Fiji Indian community. When Vashist Muni arrived in Fiji, in 1920, and conducted meetings in different parts of the Western Division, Badri Maharaj provided confidential reports on his activities to the Government. In one report he noted that the Sadhu’s followers were "businessmen, planters and civil servants" referring to the people who joined Vashist Muni at Penang as "renegades".

Badri Maharaj was the only Fiji Indian member of the Indian Franchise Commission, appointed in August 1920 (between the two strikes), to establish the means to provide Fiji Indians with elected representation. He was not present at most of the deliberations, even though one of the issues discussed was whether election should be through the use of panchayats, and had no influence on its outcome.

On 31 January 1920, the Governor formally appointed a Commission under the Chief Justice to enquire into and report on existing wages and the cost of living and to indicate whether existing wages and salaries provided for a reasonable livelihood, and if not, to suggest measures necessary for adjustment. Badri Maharaj was one of the commissioners.

Badri Maharaj opposed the 1920 strike by workers in the Central Division. He called for workers to return to work and was strongly opposed to the views of Manilal Doctor, who was regarded as the leader of the strikers. Badri Maharaj warned a meeting at Nausori of the danger into which they were being led by agitators. On the following day Fiji Indians were reported to be returning to work.

=== Opponent of poll tax ===
In July 1923 the Fiji Government introduced legislation to provide for an ungraduated poll tax, called the residential tax, of 1 pound to be paid by all non-Fijian adult males between 18 and 60. Badri Maharaj, the nominated Indian member of the Legislative Council, resigned his seat in protest. He did not oppose the tax in principle but argued that it should apply to voters only, not to labourers, who could not afford it. In 1926 the Young Men's Indian Association asked for an Indian member to be nominated again to the Legislative Council and Badri Maharaj was re-nominated.

== Supporter of Arya Samaj ==
Badri Maharaj was one of the founding members of the Arya Samaj in Fiji. He contributed generously to its religious and educations programs. His sons continued his work in the Arya Samaj. On 28 August 1956, during the Arya Samaj Golden Jubilee celebrations, he was posthumously awarded with the Dayanand Medal for Meritorious Service.

== Personal life ==
Maharaj's son Sadanand served as a member of the Legislative Council in the early 1950s.
