= George Toganivalu =

Fijian chief and politician

Roko Tui of Bua
- In office 1928–

Roko Tui of Ba
- In office 1946–

Nominated Member of the Legislative Council
- In office 1940–1951

Personal details
- Died: 17 June 1951 Suva, Fiji

Ratu George Toganivalu OBE (died 17 June 1951) was a Fijian chief and politician. He was Roko Tui of Bua and Ba, and a member of the Legislative Council between 1940 and 1951.

== Biography ==
During World War I he joined the Māori Battalion and served in France. When he returned to Fiji he joined the civil service, becoming Native Assistant Commissioner in Bua. He was subsequently appointed Roko Tui of the province in 1928, succeeding his father Deve.

In 1940 Toganivalu was appointed to the Legislative Council. During World War II he was a captain in the Labour Battalion of the Fiji Military Forces. He became Roko Tui of Ba Province in 1946, and was given an OBE in the 1949 New Year Honours.

He died in June 1951 in Suva. His sons Julian and William also later served as MPs.
