= Ami Chandra =

Fijian politician (1900–1954)

Pandit Ami Chandra
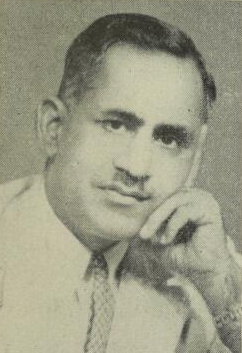
- Chandra in 1954

Nominated Member of Legislative Council
- In office 1947–1950

Personal details
- Born: 1900 India
- Died: 13 March 1954 (aged 53–54) Singapore
- Spouse: Sarvati Deviji
- Profession: Educationist, trade unionist, politician

Chandra and his wife Deviji

Pandit Ami Chandra Vidyalankar (1900 – 13 March 1954) was an Indo-Fijian educator, preacher, labour leader, politician and football administrator. He served as a member of the Legislative Council between 1947 and 1953.

== Biography ==
Chandra, a graduate of Gurukul Kangri University in India, arrived in Fiji on 22 December 1927 at the behest of the Arya Samaj, which wanted to improve the education standard of Indo-Fijian students and promote Arya Samaj in Fiji.

After a brief sojourn at Suva, he started teaching at the Gurukul Primary School in Saweni, Lautoka. In 1928 he became the Principal and under his leadership, boarding facilities were established at the school with 45 boarders out of a total population of 140, including 25 native Fijian students. During his time as Principal, the school made remarkable progress and he was commended by the Governor, Sir Murchison Fletcher.

He was the founder of the Fiji Teachers Union in 1929 and its first President. He was mentor of many of the early trade unionists and was the inspiration behind the formation of the Chini Mazdur Sangh (now known as the Sugar General Workers Union) and the Gold Mine Workers Union of Vatukoula. He was seen as a person who could be trusted by all sections of the Indian community, and when the Kisan Sangh split into two factions in 1943, both sides agreed to have the union's books audited by him. He was the president of the Fiji Industrial Workers Congress (now the Fiji Trades Union Congress), an umbrella organisation representing all but one of the unions in Fiji. He promoted multi-racial trade unions and opposed the participation of any trade union in politics.

In 1930 Chandra moved to Suva where he was instrumental in the establishment of Arya Samaj Girls School at Samabula. Later, he went to Ba, establishing another school, Arya Kanya Pathshala (Arya Girls School).

While in Ba Chandra was also recruited by the Colonial Sugar Refining Company (CSR) to teach company employees and overseers to speak proper Hindi and understand Indian culture. His greatest contribution was the series of books, Hindi Ki Pothi (Hindi Readers), that he published to enable Indian students to learn Hindi easily. These readers were compiled for students of different levels in primary schools and were used in Fiji for over twenty years.

In 1935, with support from CSR, he formed the Ba Indian Football Association with a local league which grew to four teams by 1940.

Between 1947 and 1950 he was a nominated member of the Legislative Council, working closely with Vishnu Deo.

In 1950, he opened a post primary class for youth using volunteer professionals from a cross section of society in Ba.

Chandra died in a plane crash in Singapore on 13 March 1954. He had been married to Sarvati Deviji and had four daughters; Saroj, Jyan, Pushpa and Om.

== Legacy ==
On 16 March 1954, the Fiji Industrial Workers Congress, of which he was the President, set up and opened a fund to erect a building in his emory on the family land in Samabula, Suva (but a building was constructed for this purpose by the Arya Pratinhdhi Sabah of Fiji.

On 28 August 1956, during the Arya Samaj Golden Jubilee celebrations, he was posthumously awarded with the Dayanand Medal for Meritorious Service.

In 1957, the people of Tawakubu, Lautoka honoured him by establishing a primary school, which in his honour was named, the Ami Chandra Memorial School.

He was a man of great scholarship and humility and when he died in a plane crash in Singapore, on 13 March 1954, on his way to England as the guest of the British Trades Union Congress, Fiji Indians suffered a great loss as he was also being touted as a future successor to Vishnu Deo. Reporting his death, the Fiji Times stated that, "He was a good citizen, wise in counsel, wide in sympathy, lofty in ideals and one who gave himself to the service of his fellow men."
