= Ayodhya Prasad =

Fijian politician

Ayodhya Prasad Sharma
- अयोध्या प्रसाद शर्मा

Member of Legislative Council
- In office 1953–1959
- Preceded by: Tulsi Ram Sharma
- Succeeded by: B. D. Lakshman
- Constituency: Northern and Western (Indian)

Personal details
- Born: 30 April 1909 Butana, Rohtak, Punjab, British India
- Died: 28 February 1972 (aged 62) Lautoka, Fiji
- Party: National Congress of Fiji
- Profession: Farmer, trade unionist

Ayodhya Prasad Sharma (Hindi: अयोध्या प्रसाद शर्मा, 30 April 1909 – 28 February 1972) was an Indo-Fijian farmers' leader and politician. He formed the most successful farmers' union in Fiji and forced the Colonial Sugar Refining Company to make concessions to farmers after 60 years of total control over Fiji's economy. However, other Indo-Fijian leaders formed rival unions and his initial success was not repeated. He also served as a member of the Legislative Council between 1953 and 1959.

== First trip to Fiji ==
Ayodhya Prasad was born in Butana village in the district of Rohtak in the state of Punjab in India on 30 April 1909. While studying in India, he learned about the freedom enjoyed by people in foreign countries and decided to go to one of these countries. He persuaded his father to let him travel overseas for three years and arrived in Fiji in January 1929. Since there was a shortage of teachers in Fiji he obtained a third grade teacher's certificate and started teaching in Gurkul Primary School in Saweni, Lautoka. Due to public demand he soon left for Tunaliya, Nadi where he helped to build a school. There was no syllabus for teaching Hindi and when the school inspector found him teaching Hindi using a book which aroused nationalistic spirit amongst the Fiji Indians, Ayodhya Prasad was asked to stop using the book. He refused and his registration as a teacher was cancelled. In 1931 he returned to India. On his way to India, Ayodhya Prasad met an American, with whom he had a discussion about the political situation in India. At the end of the discussion he realised that Indians were under the control of foreigners, not because the English were bad but because the Indians were not united.

== Return to Fiji ==
Ayodhya Prasad returned to Fiji in April 1932 to prepare to go to America to study. To earn money for his trip, he acquired some land in Yalalevu, Ba and started cane farming. He worked very hard on this farm but was told by the Colonial Sugar Refining Company (CSR) that most of his cane had turned into molasses and his cane had very low sugar content. The money he received for the cane was not even sufficient to cover his costs. He did not receive any statement from the company detailing the amount received for the cane and the amount deducted for costs like fertiliser. His dream of going to America was in tatters. In the 1937 Legislative Council elections he supported Chattur Singh, who defeated his more educated opponent, A. D. Patel by a narrow margin but this result was to have profound implications for the relationship between A.D. Patel and Ayodhya Prasad in later years. After the election, people who had seen the determination with which he had campaigned in the election, persuaded him to give up his dream of going to America and to organise the farmers of Fiji.

== Formation of Kisan Sangh ==
Well aware that there was great fear amongst the Fiji Indian cane farmers of the Company, he started organising the farmers union in secret concentrating among the young members of the community because they were more passionate and were unlikely to be owners or lessees of property. In September 1937, he held the first secret meeting in Drasa, Lautoka following the celebrations marking the birth of Lord Krishna. On 27 November 1937, at a meeting in Wailailai, Ba, the Kisan Sangh (Farmers' Union) was formed. The first task for the new Union was to find someone to take up leadership of the new union. A number of people which included A.D. Patel, S. B. Patel and Swami Rudhrananda, Chattur Singh and Vishnu Deo were approached, but all declined the invitation. Undeterred, Ayodhya Prasad decided that the best solution was to learn from Mahatma Gandhi and live amongst the farmers while he preached the virtues of the Union to them. He decided to set up tents on Company land in different settlements so that he and his helpers could preach from it. On 18 May 1938, with the help of his young volunteers, he set up tent on Company land starting in Nadroga which is at the Southern end of the North Western cane growing area of Viti Levu and moved along the coast to the Northern end of Viti Levu. Initially none of the local farmers approached the tent but as the farmers saw the sacrifice being made by Ayodhya Prasad and his young volunteers and the inability of the Company overseers to stop him, they gradually started to join up. Following the success of this grass-roots campaign, Ayodhya Prasad spent the next four months organising the Kisan Sangh. First village committees were formed. These committees then met and formed district committees which selected members for the Central Committee based on the membership of the district committee.

== Campaign for Cane Contract ==
On 9 February a letter was sent to the Company seeking negotiations for a cane contract but the Company ignored the Kisan Sangh. The CSR controlled the farmers through the sardars, and so Ayodhya Prasad put up candidates in the election for sardars and won most of these positions. Most sardars then took advice from the Kisan Sangh on receiving any Company directive. On seeing the strength of the Kisan Sangh, the Company started issuing statements with cane payments and circulated a contract for the next season's crop, both of which were original Kisan Sangh demands. Ayodhya Prasad and the Kisan Sangh advised the farmers not to plant crops for the following year until a suitable contract was agreed to. Under pressure from the Government, agreement was reached for a 10-year contract which included several concessions by the Company and an increase in the price of cane.

== Involvement in politics ==
By 1940 the Kisan Sangh had become the most powerful organisation in Fiji and in July 1940 had a membership of 4245 from a total of 5918 cane-farmers in the North Western districts of Viti Levu. In the Legislative Council election in 1940, B.D. Lakshman stood for the North Western Constituency with Kisan Sangh and Ayodhya Prasad's support and won easily. On 15 June 1941, A.D. Patel formed the Maha Sangh, in opposition to Ayodhya Prasad's Kisan Sangh. Ayodhya Prasad and his supporters tried to stop the formation of the new union but were not successful. In 1943, Ayodhya Prasad was devastated when some executive members of the Kisan Sangh supported the Maha Sangh in a strike for a new contract, despite the fact that the contract signed by farmers in 1940 was for a period of ten years. Ignoring pleas from Ayodhya Prasad, farmers did not start harvesting on time and lost thousands of dollars. In the meantime, efforts by the Government to restrict the movement of A.D. Patel only increased his support. By 1944, the Kisan Sangh was badly split and A.D. Patel, easily won the election for the North Western Constituency seat in the Legislative Council.

== Rebuilding the Kisan Sangh ==
It took Ayodhya Prasad until 1950 to rebuild the Kisan Sangh so that it was again the largest farmers' organisation in Fiji with support extending to the northern cane farming areas in Vanua Levu and a new farmers' union allied to the Kisan Sangh active in the Rewa area. He also managed to force the CSR to agree a new 10-year contract in 1950 which gave further increases to the price of sugar cane. In the 1950 election, a candidate supported by Ayodhya Prasad easily defeated A.D. Patel in the North Western Indian Division in the Legislative Council. Despite being involved un politics since 1937, Ayodhya Prasad, himself stood for the Legislative Council election for the first time in 1953 when he defeated his old foe, A.D. Patel by 2718 votes to 1919 votes for North Western Constituency. In the 1956 Legislative Council elections, he faced opposition from three high profile ex-Legislative Council members: K.S. Reddy, B.D. Lakshman and Chattur Singh, but won easily. In 1959, he lost his seat to his one-time ally, B.D. Lakshman, who had gained prominence as leader of sugar mill workers.

== The Twilight Years ==
In 1959, Ayodhya Prasad's Kisan Sangh joined a united cane growers' organisation, known as the Federation of Cane Growers, to negotiate the next ten-year contract. Differences again rose between Ayodhya Prasad's and A.D. Patel's supporters resulting in Ayodhya Prasad's supporters signing the new cane contract, while Patel's supporters went on strike. Ayodhya Prasad and the Kisan Sangh were blamed for the failure of the farmers to get a good deal and in the 1963 Legislative Council elections, Patel and his supporters won all the Indian Communal seats in the cane growing areas. In 1965, on the eve of the London Constitutional Conference, Ayodhya Prasad formed the National Congress of Fiji and made representation to the United Nations on behalf of Fiji Indians. In late 1965, he worked with Ratu Mara to form the Alliance Party. As Ayodhya Prasd was flexible about the system of voting, Ratu Kamisese Mara found that he could guarantee more secure land tenure to Indian farmers in return for working with the Congress to form the Alliance Party. In the 1966 Legislative Council election, he again stood against Patel, and lost by a large margin. He was disappointed with Vijay R. Singh for encouraging direct membership for Indians into the Alliance Party instead of through the National Congress of Fiji. He believed that if the Congress had remained a constituent part of the Alliance Party then Fiji Indians would have had an equal say in it. With failing health he could do little and the Fiji National Congress was wound up. Ayodhya Prasad died on 28 February 1972. He had settled in Naviyago, Drasa and was elected as the Manager of Drasa Indian School. It’s in Drasa that the end of his wonderful and unique journey of life came to an end. His funeral was attended by thousands of people. Even the then Prime Minister Ratu Mara also attended the funeral. His funeral cortege was 6 miles long. Names of his children: Pt. Ramesh Sharma, Pt Om Prakash, Criminal Lawyer Naresh Prasad Sharma, Lakshmi Chand Senior Superintendent of Police, Chandra Wati and Vidya Wati. We thank him for his distinguished services to the Nation May his soul have peace. Om Shanti. Satya Nand Sharma

== Bibliography ==
- A.P. Sharma, A History of Fiji Kisan Sangh, Vicas Press, Lautoka, Fiji 2005
