= J. B. Tularam =

Fijian politician

J B Tularam

Member of Legislative Council (Fiji) Eastern Indian Constituency
- In office 1937–1944

J. B. Tularam was a Fiji Indian member of the Legislative Council of Fiji elected from the Eastern Constituency in 1937 by defeating Channa Bhai Patel by 14 votes. The constituency was made up of the provinces of Lomaiviti, Lau, Cakaudrove and Macuata. He was a member of the council until 1944.
