= Vishnu Deo =

Fijian politician (1900–1968)

Pandit Vishnu Deo OBE
- विष्णु देव
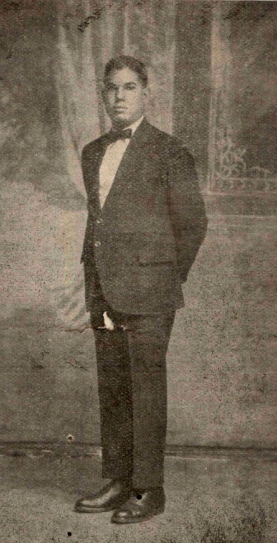

Member of the Legislative Council for Southern Division
- In office 1929, 1937 – 1959
- Preceded by: K. B. Singh
- Succeeded by: B. D. Lakshman

Member of Executive Council (Fiji)
- In office 1956–1959
- Preceded by: James Madhavan

Personal details
- Born: 17 July 1900 Navua, Fiji
- Died: 7 May 1968 (aged 67) Suva, Fiji
- Profession: Customs Agent, Editor

Pt. Vishnu Deo (Hindi: विष्णु देव) OBE (17 July 1900 – 7 May 1968) was the first Fiji born and bred leader of the Indo-Fijians. From his initial election to the Legislative Council in 1929 to his retirement in 1959, he remained the most powerful Indo-Fijians political leader in Fiji. He was a staunch supporter of Arya Samaj in Fiji and also the editor of the first successful Hindi-language newspaper to be published in Fiji.

== Early life ==
Pandit Vishnu Deo was born on 17 July 1900. He attended Marist Brothers School and had a keen intellect, becoming a fluent debater in both English and Hindi. He joined the immigration department as a clerk in 1918, taught at a school established by M. N. Naidu in Lautoka in the early 1920s, and started his own importing and exporting agency in 1927. In 1922, he had assisted the Raju Commission which had been sent to Fiji to make enquiries into the plight of the Indian community.

Vishnu Deo also founded a number of social and religious organisations. The Governor of Fiji proclaimed 15 May 1929 a public holiday to celebrate the 50th anniversary of the arrival of the first Indians in Fiji, but Vishnu Deo wanted this to be a day of mourning; at a meeting in Lautoka on 12 May 1929, it was decided to fast and pray on the day and to form the Fiji Indian National Congress. While there was an official ceremony and floats through Suva, Vishnu Deo and his associates displayed a black flag and burned the indenture system in effigy.

== Fight for equal rights ==
After a sustained campaign by Indo-Fijians for equal rights, constitutional amendments made in 1929 created three elected Indo-Fijian seats in the Legislative Council. In the elections later that year, Deo was elected to the Council, easily defeating John F. Grant in the Southern Division. Deo was sworn into the Legislative Council on 25 October 1929, and on 5 November moved a motion calling for common roll franchise. Upon the defeat of the motion, Vishnu Deo and the other two Indo-Fijians members resigned. The strength of support for his policy by the Indo-Fijians was demonstrated by the fact that when nominations were later called to fill the Legislative Council vacancies, no nominations were made.

== Second World War ==
During the Second World War, Vishnu Deo advised Indo-Fijians to enlist in the Indian Platoon only if they were paid the same wages as Europeans. He was initially appointed to the Central Indian War Committee but had his appointment terminated when he published a serial record of a Committee meeting in his newspaper, the Fiji Samachar. According to his account, a majority of members at that meeting had expressed similar views regarding Indian enlistment. Later Deo, together with other Indian members of the Legislative Council, cooperated in recruiting volunteers for the Indian Civilian Labour Force. In June 1943 he addressed workers from the Ba and Lautoka sugar mills and persuaded some to join the Labour Force at better pay than what they were getting from their employer, the Colonial Sugar Refining Company.

== Religious activities ==
Vishnu Deo was a leader of Arya Samaj in Fiji. He took a proactive role in propagating the teachings of Swami Dayanand, some of which were the establishment of a castless society, education for girls, an end to child marriage and remarriage for widows. He soon found himself at loggerheads with other religious groups, who for the first time had to deal with a Hindu society aggressively promoting re-conversion to Hinduism. He participated in public debates, and during one of these debates published material for which he was convicted and fined. He was the editor of the Hindi language newspaper, Fiji Samachar, which was regarded as the mouthpiece of the Arya Samaj in Fiji.

== Political leader ==
Although ineligible to contest the 1932 elections due to his earlier conviction, Vishnu Deo won the Southern Division seven times between 1937 and 1959. During his early political career he worked closely with the other champion of common roll in Fiji, A. D. Patel. They did not have the same view on all issues, however; for example, Deo supported education in Hindi for Indo-Fijians, whereas A. D. Patel believed that regional Indian languages were the better choice for Indo-Fijians schools. As Vishnu Deo was based in the Southern Division and A.D. Patel in the Western Division, there was no competition between the two until it was decided to nominate an Indian into the Executive Council in 1948. Both Indian leaders believed that they deserved the honour, but Patel managed to outmanoeuvre Vishnu Deo and gain the support of three of the five Indian members of the Legislative Council to become the Indian Member of the Executive Council. During the next election, however, Vishnu Deo had his revenge when a candidate he supported (Tulsi Ram Sharma) easily defeated A.D. Patel, who was kept out of the Legislative Council for as long as Vishnu Deo remained politically active.

After the 1950 Legislative Council elections, James Madhavan was chosen as the Indian member in the Executive Council. Vishnu Deo had to wait until 1956 before he finally joined the Executive Council.

== Leader of the cane farmers ==
When negotiations began for the 1950 cane contract, there was a split among the Rewa farmers. Vishnu Deo stepped in to provide a unified voice for these farmers. From a personal perspective, this action ultimately had the effect of creating a further rift between himself and A.D. Patel, because he supported A.D. Patel's lifelong opponent, Ayodhya Prasad, in the ensuing cane dispute.

== Later years ==
During his final years of public service, Deo no longer displayed his firebrand characteristics of the 1920s and 1930s, but instead had mellowed and became beloved and respected by all sections of Fiji's population.

When Radio Fiji started broadcasting in July 1954, the first Hindi voice heard over the air in Fiji was that of Vishnu Deo, who presented the inaugural address. He had been appointed to the Commission in March 1954, following the death of Ami Chandra.

On 14 September 1956 Pundit Vishnu Deo was appointed to the Executive Council. In the selection of Vishnu Deo, the Indian members displayed remarkable unity as reported by the Fiji Times (10/10/1956):

The appointment of Mr. Pdt. Vishnu Deo to the Executive Council was unanimously endorsed at a meeting of the five Indian Legislative Council members held at Nausori during the weekend. This is believed to be the first time in Fiji when all Legislative Council members of any race combined to support the candidature of one of their own members into the Executive Council.

In November 1958, in his speech to welcome the new Governor, Sir Kenneth Maddocks, he again displayed a conciliatory approach and said:

I assure you Sir, that we will at all times co-operate with you in this Council and outside the Council on all matters that are for the welfare of the Colony and every section of the community.

During the same sitting of the Legislative Council, H. B. Gibson, European member for Eastern Division, pointed out that although the rules of the Legislative Council made him the Senior Member, the Father of the House—both by length of service and by age—was Mr Vishnu Deo.

== Legacy ==
Vishnu Deo died on 7 May 1968 but his contribution to the Indo-Fijians can be seen by the number of schools and roads named after him. Some of these are:

- Vishnu Deo Road, located at Nasinu 9 ½ Miles and is the main trunk road to the newly developed suburb of Nakasi.
- Vishnu Deo Secondary School, located between Lautoka and Nadi and is also the site of the University of Fiji.
- Vishnu Deo Primary School, located in Raiwaga, Suva, was one of the first multi-racial schools established in Fiji

== See also ==
- Arya Samaj in Fiji
- Fiji Samachar
