= Executive Council of Fiji =

Council of Fiji

The colonial Governors of Fiji relied on the Executive Council for advice on proposals for legislation which, after being discussed in the Executive Council meetings, came before the Legislative Council in the form of bills. In this way, the Executive Council was the chief policy-making body and performed cabinet-like functions, but being advisory, was not yet a cabinet in function. This role changed in 1964 with the introduction of the membership system.

== The first Executive Council ==
Immediately after Fiji was ceded to the United Kingdom, on 10 October 1874, the first Governor, Sir Hercules Robinson, established an Executive Council with himself as President and comprising six other Europeans.

== Inclusion of Legislative Council members ==
Changes to the Constitution in 1916 provided for an Executive Council consisting of the Governor, Colonial Secretary, Attorney General, and such other persons as the Governor in pursuance of Royal instructions received through the Secretary of State for the Colonies, may from time to time appoint. From 1912, the Executive Council also included two unofficial (representatives of the community and not directly employed by the Government), who were European elected members of the Legislative Council. The first two European members were J. B. Turner and Henry Scott.

== Inclusion of ethnic Fijians and Fiji Indians ==
Ever since its inception in Fiji, Executive Council members were all Europeans, until Ratu Sukuna, an ethnic Fijian, was appointed in 1943. In the late 1930s, when the Colonial Office urged for an Indian appointment, the then Governor, Sir Arthur Richards, said;

A man maybe highly representative of the petty trader, the petty shopkeeper or the petty farmer but if he also has the limitations of the petty trader he would be useless as an advisor.

but an Indian, K. B. Singh was finally appointed to the Executive Council in 1946.

== Selection from Legislative Council ==
A committee formed in 1948 proposed that the five unofficial representatives of each racial group be empowered to select one of their own numbers to be a member of the Executive Council. The selection of an Indian into the Executive Council caused a rift between Indian members of the Legislative Council. A. D. Patel managed to outmaneuver Vishnu Deo for this position which made bitter enemies of these former political allies. Vishnu Deo's political machine ensured that Patel did not get elected for the next thirteen years.

== Membership System ==
On 1 July 1964, a membership system of Government was installed with the composition of the Executive Council modified to allocate a majority of the seats to unofficial members. A Fijian, an Indian and a European were granted portfolios. John Falvey was appointed Member for Communications and Works, Ratu Kamisese Mara was appointed Member for Natural Resources and A. D. Patel was appointed member for Social Services.

== See also ==
- Executive Council
- Legislative Council of Fiji
