= Edward Cakobau =

Fijian cricketer and politician

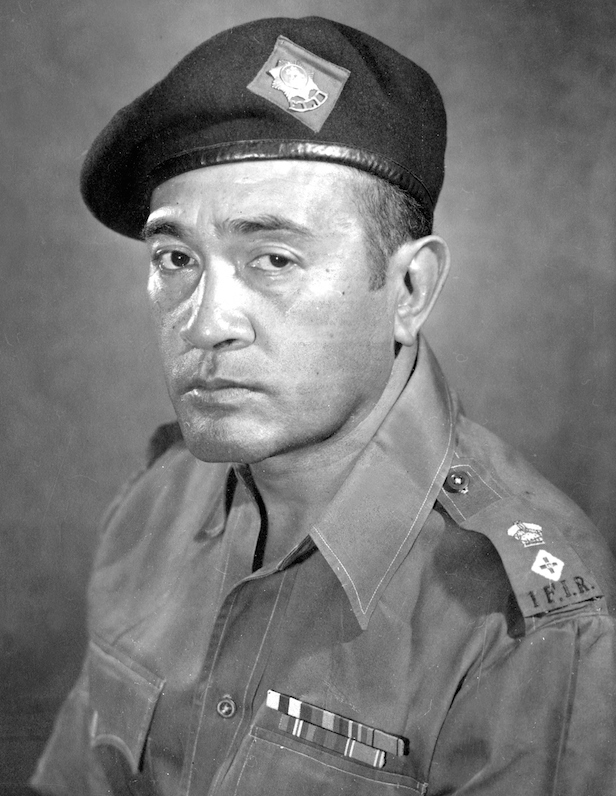
- Cakobau circa 1956

Deputy Prime Minister of Fiji
- In office 1972–1973
- Prime Minister: Kamisese Mara
- Succeeded by: Penaia Ganilau

Member of the House of Representatives
- In office 1972–1973
- Succeeded by: Mosese Qionibaravi
- Constituency: Suva East National (Fijian)
- In office 1966–1972
- Constituency: Central Cross-Voting (Fijian)

Minister for Commerce, Industry and Labour
- In office 1967–1972

Member for Commerce, Industry and Tourism
- In office 1966–1967

Nominated Member of the Legislative Council
- In office 1944–1966

Personal details
- Born: 21 December 1908 Bau, Fiji
- Died: 25 June 1973 (aged 64) Suva, Fiji

Ratu Sir Edward Tuivanuavou Tugi Cakobau KBE MC ED (21 December 1908 – 25 June 1973) was a Fijian chief, soldier, politician and cricketer. He was a member of the Fijian legislature from 1944 until his death, also serving as Minister for Commerce, Industry and Labour and Deputy Prime Minister. During the 1940s he made two appearances for the Fiji national cricket team.

== Eduaction, Family, and Early Life ==
Edward was born on December 21, 1908. He was born from Adi Litia Cakobau's realtionship with King George Tupou II of Tonga. His Mother, Litia was the granddaughter of Seru Epenisa Cakobau, the first and Only King of Fiji. He was a half-brother of Queen Salote Tupou III of Tonga.

He attended Queen Victoria School and was educated at Wanganui Technical College between 1923 and 1928, and then Auckland Technical College. Whilst in New Zealand, he played a single first-class match for Auckland in the 1930–31 Plunket Shield and later made two first-class appearances for Fiji in 1948 against Otago and Auckland. He later attended Wadham College, Oxford to study colonial administration.

== Military Career ==
He was commissioned a lieutenant During World War II and rose to the rank of Captain and Company Commander of the 3rd Battalion FMF. He fought in the Solomon Islands, for which he was awarded the Military Cross. He later returned to military service during the Malayan Emergency, serving in Malaya in 1953 and 1954, during which he became commanding officer of the Fiji Battalion.

== Political Career ==
=== Colonial Administration ===
Upon finishing his education in New Zealand and England, Edward returned to Fiji and worked as a Schoolteacher at his Old School Queen Victoria School where he was Assistant Head Master.

He later became a civil servant, starting as a clerk in the Native Affairs Department. He went on to become Assistant Commissioner and Roko Tui for Lomaiviti. He became a Member of the Great Council of Chiefs right after. He was then made District Officer at Suva twice, the second time being after he left for the Malayan emergency. He then went on to become Deputy Secretary for Fijian Affairs.

In 1944 he was appointed to the Legislative council as one of the five nominate Fijian members. He Continued to be nominated to the Legislative council till Fiji gained its Independence in 1970. While on the Council Edward was Minister for Commerce, Industry, and Tourism for 6 years.

=== Post Fiji Independence ===
He ran in the 1972 Elections (First elections of Independent Fiji). He ran for the East Suva National Constituency which is where all ethnicities voted, but all candidates had to be Fijian. He won the Seat. After the election he was made Fiji's first Deputy Prime Minister. In 1973, he died and a by-election was triggered where he was succeeded by Mosese Qionibaravi.

== Sports ==
Edward played and coached Cricket and Rugby. He managed the 1964 Fiji rugby union tour of Europe and Canada where the Fiji beat Wales and France. He was also President of the Fiji Cricket Association.

=== Cricket Statistics ===
He Played 3 matches. He played First-Class.He had 89 Runs Scored. A Batting Average of 22.25. A top Score of 47. 420 Balls Bowled. 11 Wickets. Bowling average of 18.63. He also had 1 Five Wickets in innings.

== Personal ==
Edward had 1 kid with Laisa Fonolahi a Boy named Ratu Viliame Dreunimisimisi. Edward went on to marry Adi Vasemaca Toroca and Have 3 kids with her. Ratu Epeli Nailatikau, Later Became Speaker and President. Ratu George Tu'uakitau Cokanauto, Former Fijian MP and Cabinet Minister. Ratu Keni Vuiyasawa, Fijian Military Officer and Chief.

Edward Passed away on June 25, 1973 at the Age of 64 at the Fiji Colonial War Memorial Hospital. Prior to his death he had underwent medical treatment and surgery in Auckland, New Zealand. Following his Operation he returned, but subsequently suffered a short illness before passing away. He was Given full Ceremonial State honor's. Edward Was buried on Bau, Fiji Where he was born.

== Honours, Medals, and Decorations ==
Image	Name	Reason:	Date received
	Knight Commander of the Order of the British Empire	Leadership as Deputy Prime Minister of Fiji	1971 Birthday Honours
Military Cross		Efficiency Decoration	1939–1945 Star
Pacific Star		Defence Medal (United Kingdom)	War Medal 1939–1945
Fiji Independence Medal		Queen Elizabeth II Coronation Medal	King George VI Coronation Medal

== See also ==
- List of Auckland representative cricketers
