= Legislative Council of Fiji =

Colonial era legislature

The Legislative Council of Fiji was the colonial precursor to the present-day Parliament, which came into existence when Fiji became independent on 10 October 1970.

== The first Legislative Council ==
Immediately after Fiji was ceded to the United Kingdom, on 10 October 1874, the first Governor, Sir Hercules Robinson, established an Executive Council with himself as President and comprising six other Europeans. This was a temporary measure to make policy decisions necessary to found and legitimise the new Colonial Government and to carry out the day-to-day affairs of the Government. With the arrival of Sir Arthur Gordon, on 1 September 1875, a permanent machinery for governing the new colony was established. In addition to the Executive Council, Gordon established a Legislative Council composed entirely of nominated members, of whom six were official (public officers, usually heads of Government departments), including the Governor of Fiji, the Colonial Secretary (the day-to-day executive power), the Chief Justice of Fiji and the Attorney General of Fiji; and four unofficial (representatives of the community not directly employed by the Government) members nominated by the Governor with the approval of the Secretary of State for the Colonies. Thus all ten members of the Legislative Council were Europeans.

== Elected European and Nominated Fijian Representation ==
The first step towards making the Council a popularly elected legislature was taken in 1904, when the council was reconstituted as a 19-member body consisting of the Governor, 10 official members appointed by the Governor, 6 elected members chosen by European males, and 2 Fijian members appointed by the Governor from a list of 6 nominees submitted by the Great Council of Chiefs. Persistent demands by Europeans led to an increase in their representation to seven in 1914.

== First Indian Nominated member ==
On 20 July 1916, the composition of the Legislative Council was increased to twelve nominated members of whom eleven were official members and one a British subject not holding any such office, seven elected European members and two Fijian members. On 29 January 1917, Badril Maharaj, a rich farmer from Rakiraki representing the Indian community, took the twelfth nominated seat in the Legislative Council. He served in the Legislative Council until 1923, when he resigned in opposition to the poll tax but was re-nominated in 1926 and stayed on as a member until 1929. He founded the first school for Girmitiyas descendents in Fiji called the Wairuku School in 1898. Amongst its early alumna was Ratu Sir Lala Sukuna.

== Elected Indian Representation ==
On 1 May 1929, the franchise was extended to Indian males twenty-one years of age and over who met the same income, residency, literacy and nationality qualifications as Europeans. The new Legislative Council consisted of the Governor as President, not more than thirteen official members, three nominated Fijian members, six elected Europeans and three elected Indians. Europeans and Indians were elected from separate communal rolls, while the Fijians were nominated from a panel of four to six names submitted by the Great Council of Chiefs.

== Racial parity of non-official members ==
The next major development took place in 1937, when the Legislative Council was enlarged to 32 members. Of these, 17 were official members appointed by the Governor. In addition, there were five non-official members from each of the three major ethnic groups (Fijians, Indo-Fijians, and Europeans); Indo-Fijians and Europeans directly elected 3 members each, with a further 2 being appointed by the Governor; all 5 Fijian representatives were appointed by the Governor from a list of ten names submitted by the Great Council of Chiefs. In 1954, Ratu Sir Lala Sukuna was appointed the first Speaker of the Legislative Council.

== Women and Fijians enfranchised ==
In 1963, women were enfranchised and indigenous Fijians were empowered for the first time to vote directly for their representatives on the Legislative Council. The Legislative Council elected in 1963 had 37 members. There were 12 elected members, four from each of the Fijian, Indian and European groups chosen on a communal franchise. The Governor also nominated two from each of the communities. There were to be 19 official members. The Legislative Councillors of each race were permitted to select two from their fellows to the Executive Council. Qualifications to register as a voter disallowed illiterate adults to vote, permitted some people to choose between ethnic rolls and made no provision for Rotumans, Pacific Islanders, Chinese and Part-Chinese to vote.

== Universal adult suffrage ==
The Legislative Council elected in 1966 had 36 members. 25 seats represented Communal constituencies (9 indigenous Fijians (Fijians and Pacific Islanders), 9 Indo-Fijians, and 7 General electors (Europeans, Chinese), elected on closed electoral rolls by voters registered as members of their respective ethnic groups. A further 9 members were elected from cross-voting (from 1972 referred to as National) constituencies – seats allocated ethnically (3 for each ethnic constituency) but elected by universal suffrage. The remaining 2 members were nominated by the Great Council of Chiefs. The president of the Legislative Council was H. Maurice Scott.

== Responsible government ==
Responsible government was not introduced until 1967. A four-member Executive Council had existed from 1904, but it was not a Cabinet in the modern sense: it was appointed by the colonial Governor and responsible to him alone. The first step towards adoption of the Westminster System of responsible government was taken in 1964 with the adoption of the Member system, whereby 3 members of the Legislative Council (one from each ethnic constituency) were appointed to the Executive Council and given portfolio responsibilities supervising government departments. They were not "Ministers" in the modern sense, however, as they were still responsible only to the Governor and could not be dismissed by the Legislative Council. In 1967, however, a full ministerial system was adopted, with a Cabinet responsible to the Legislature. Ratu Kamisese Mara (who was subsequently knighted in 1969) was appointed as the first Chief Minister.

== After independence ==
When Fiji became independent on 10 October 1970, the Legislative Council was replaced by the Fijian Parliament. A grandfather clause in the Constitution provided for the old Legislative Council to remain in office, with its name changed to the House of Representatives, pending the first post-independence elections of 1972.

== Speakers ==
The speaker position was created in November 1954 by letters patent. The speaker was appointed by the Governor of Fiji.

- The Governor as speaker, 1954–1956
- Lala Sukuna, 1956–1958
- Maurice Scott, 1958–1966
- Ronald Kermode, 1966–1970

== Changing Composition of Legislative Council ==
Year of change	European Members			Fijian Members		Indian Members		Total
Year of change	Official	Nominated	Elected	Nominated	Elected	Nominated	Elected	Total
1875	6	4	0	0	0	0	0	10
1904	11	0	6	2	0	0	0	19
1916	11	0	7	2	0	1	0	21
1929	13	0	6	3	0	0	3	25
1937	17	2	3	0	5	2	3	32
1963	19	2	4	2	4	2	4	37
1966	0	0	10	2	12	0	12	36
