= List of members of the Parliament of Fiji (1977) =

The members of the Parliament of Fiji from April to September 1977 consisted of members of the House of Representatives elected between 19 March and 2 April 1977, and members of the nominated Senate.

== House of Representatives ==
Constituency	Member	Party
Fijian Communal (12 seats)
Ba–Nadi	Napolioni Dawai	Alliance Party
Bua–Macuata	Militoni Leweniqila	Alliance Party
Cakaudrove	Jone Naisara	Alliance Party
Kadavu–Tamavua–Suva Suburban	Seci Nawalowalo	Alliance Party
Lau–Rotuma	Jonati Mavoa	Alliance Party
Lomaiviti–Muanikau	Solomone Momoivalu	Alliance Party
Nadroga–Navosa	Osea Gavidi	Independent
Naitasiri	Livai Nasilivata	Alliance Party
Ra–Samabula–Suva	Jone Banuve	Alliance Party
Rewa–Serua–Namosi	Sakeasi Butadroka	Fijian Nationalist Party
Tailevu	William Toganivalu	Alliance Party
Vuda–Yasawa	Josaia Tavaiqia	Alliance Party
Indo-Fijian Communal (12 seats)
Ba	Krishna Narsingha Rao	National Federation Party
Ba–Lautoka Rural	Jai Ram Reddy	National Federation Party
Labasa–Bua	Sarvan Singh	National Federation Party
Lautoka	Sidiq Koya	National Federation Party
Nadi	H. M. Lodhia	National Federation Party
Nasinu–Vunidawa	Chandra Pillai	National Federation Party
Nausori–Levuka	K. C. Ramrakha	National Federation Party
Savusavu–Macuata East	Santa Singh	National Federation Party
Sigatoka	Harish Sharma	National Federation Party
Suva City	Irene Jai Narayan	National Federation Party
Suva Rural	Chandra Prakash Sharma	National Federation Party
Tavua–Vaileka	Ram Sami Goundar	National Federation Party
General Communal (3 seats)
Northern and Eastern	Hugh Thaggard	Alliance Party
South–Central	William Yee	Alliance Party
Western	Frederick William Caine	Alliance Party
Fijian National (10 seats)
East Central	Penaia Ganilau	Alliance Party
Lau-Cakaudrove–Rotuma	Kamisese Mara	Alliance Party
North-Central	Sakeo Tuiwainikai	National Federation Party
North-Eastern	Timoci Naco	National Federation Party
North-Western	Apisai Tora	National Federation Party
South-Central Suva West	David Toganivalu	Alliance Party
South-Eastern	Asela Logavatu	National Federation Party
South-Western	Isikeli Nadalo	National Federation Party
Suva East	Mosese Qionibaravi	Alliance Party
Vanua Levu North and West	Atunaisa Maitoga	National Federation Party
Indo-Fijian National 10 seats)
East Central	K. R. Latchan	Alliance Party
Lau–Cakaudrove	James Shankar Singh	Alliance Party
North-Central	Surend Prasad	National Federation Party
North-Eastern	C. A. Shah	National Federation Party
North-Western	Kalu Singh	National Federation Party
South Central	P. K. Bhindi	Alliance Party
South-Eastern	Shiu Narayan Kanhai	National Federation Party
South-Western	Anirudh Kuver	National Federation Party
Suva	Mohammed Ramzan	Alliance Party
Vanua Levu North and West	Subramani Basawaiya	National Federation Party
General National (5 seats)
Eastern	Charles Walker	Alliance Party
Northern	Bill Crompton	National Federation Party
Southern	Charles Stinson	Alliance Party
Vanua Levu–Lau	Edward Beddoes	Alliance Party
Western	Edmund March	National Federation Party
Source: Fiji Elections

== Senate ==
Class	Member
President	Robert Munro
Council of Rotuma's Nominee	Wilson Inia
Great Council of Chiefs' Nominees	Jone Kikau
Great Council of Chiefs' Nominees	Jone Mataitini
Great Council of Chiefs' Nominees	Glanville Lalabalavu
Great Council of Chiefs' Nominees	Emosi Levula
Great Council of Chiefs' Nominees	Inoke Tabua
Great Council of Chiefs' Nominees	Kavaia Tagivetaua
Great Council of Chiefs' Nominees	Tevita Vakalalabure
Great Council of Chiefs' Nominees	Livai Volavola
Leader of the Opposition's Nominees	Chandra Prakash Bidesi
Leader of the Opposition's Nominees	Bakshi Balwant Singh Mal
Leader of the Opposition's Nominees	Ratilal Patel
Leader of the Opposition's Nominees	Kaur Baltan Singh
Leader of the Opposition's Nominees	Shiromaniam Madhavan
Prime Minister's Nominees	John Falvey
Prime Minister's Nominees	Ramanlal Kapadia
Prime Minister's Nominees	Joeli Nacola
Prime Minister's Nominees	Semesa Sikivou
Prime Minister's Nominees	Vivekanand Sharma
Prime Minister's Nominees	Tomasi Vakatora
Source: USP
