= List of members of the Parliament of Fiji (1977–1982) =

The members of the Parliament of Fiji from September 1977 to 1982 consisted of members of the House of Representatives elected between 17 and 24 September 1977 and members of the nominated Senate.

== House of Representatives ==
| Constituency | Member | Party | Notes |
Fijian Communal (12 seats)
| Ba–Nadi | Napolioni Dawai | Alliance Party | |
| Bua–Macuata | Militoni Leweniqila | Alliance Party | |
| Cakaudrove | Jone Naisara | Alliance Party | |
| Kadavu–Tamavua–Suva Suburban | Seci Nawalowalo | Alliance Party | |
| Lau–Rotuma | Jonati Mavoa | Alliance Party | |
| Lomaiviti–Muanikau | Solomone Momoivalu | Alliance Party | |
| Nadroga–Navosa | Osea Gavidi | Independent | |
| Naitasiri | Livai Nasilivata | Alliance Party | |
| Ra–Samabula–Suva | Jone Banuve | Alliance Party | |
| Rewa–Serua–Namosi | Tomasi Vakatora | Alliance Party | |
| Tailevu | William Toganivalu | Alliance Party | |
| Vuda–Yasawa | Josaia Tavaiqia | Alliance Party | |
Indo-Fijian Communal (12 seats)
| Ba | Krishna Narsingha Rao | National Federation Party–Flower | |
| Ba–Lautoka Rural | Navin Patel | National Federation Party–Flower | |
| Labasa–Bua | Sarvan Singh | National Federation Party–Flower | Singh died in 1979. Mohammed Sadiq won the resulting by-election |
| Lautoka | Jai Ram Reddy | National Federation Party–Flower | |
| Nadi | H. M. Lodhia | National Federation Party–Flower | |
| Nasinu–Vunidawa | Shiu Narayan Kanhai | National Federation Party–Dove | |
| Nausori–Levuka | K. C. Ramrakha | National Federation Party–Flower | |
| Savusavu–Macuata East | Santa Singh | National Federation Party–Flower | |
| Sigatoka | Harish Sharma | National Federation Party–Flower | |
| Suva City | Irene Jai Narayan | National Federation Party–Flower | |
| Suva Rural | Vijay Parmanandam | National Federation Party–Dove | |
| Tavua–Vaileka | Ram Sami Goundar | National Federation Party–Dove | |
General Communal (3 seats)
| Northern and Eastern | Hugh Thaggard | Alliance Party | |
| South–Central | William Yee | Alliance Party | |
| Western | Frederick William Caine | Alliance Party | |
Fijian National (10 seats)
| East Central | Penaia Ganilau | Alliance Party | |
| Lau-Cakaudrove–Rotuma | Kamisese Mara | Alliance Party | |
| North-Central | Serupepeli Naivalu | Alliance Party | |
| North-Eastern | Sakiasi Waqanivavalagi | Alliance Party | |
| North-Western | Julian Toganivalu | National Federation Party–Flower | Toganivalu died in 1977; Koresi Matatolu of the NFP–Flower won the subsequent by-election |
| South-Central Suva West | David Toganivalu | Alliance Party | |
| South-Eastern | Semesa Sikivou | Alliance Party | |
| South-Western | Isikeli Nadalo | National Federation Party–Flower | |
| Suva East | Mosese Qionibaravi | Alliance Party | |
| Vanua Levu North and West | Josefa Iloilo | Alliance Party | |
Indo-Fijian National 10 seats)
| East Central | K. R. Latchan | Alliance Party | |
| Lau–Cakaudrove | James Shankar Singh | Alliance Party | |
| North-Central | Eqbal Mohammed | Alliance Party | |
| North-Eastern | Ishwari Prasad Bajpai | Alliance Party | |
| North-Western | Jai Raj Singh | National Federation Party–Flower | |
| South Central | P. K. Bhindi | Alliance Party | |
| South-Eastern | K. S. Reddy | Alliance Party | |
| South-Western | Vivekanand Sharma | Alliance Party | |
| Suva East | Mohammed Ramzan | Alliance Party | |
| Vanua Levu North and West | Shree Ramlu | Alliance Party | |
General National (5 seats)
| Eastern | Charles Walker | Alliance Party | |
| Northern | Daniel Costello | Alliance Party | |
| Southern | Charles Stinson | Alliance Party | |
| Vanua Levu–Lau | Ted Beddoes | Alliance Party | |
| Western | Bill Clark | Alliance Party | |
Source: Fiji Elections

== Senate ==
| Class | Member | Notes |
|---|---|---|
| President | Robert Munro | |
| Council of Rotuma's Nominee | Wilson Inia | |
| Great Council of Chiefs' Nominees | Jone Kikau | Replaced by Marika Latianara in 1979 |
| Great Council of Chiefs' Nominees | Jone Mataitini | |
| Great Council of Chiefs' Nominees | Glanville Lalabalavu | |
| Great Council of Chiefs' Nominees | Emosi Levula | Replaced by Meli Loki in 1979 |
| Great Council of Chiefs' Nominees | Inoke Tabua | |
| Great Council of Chiefs' Nominees | Kavaia Tagivetaua | Replaced by Joeli Sereki in 1979 |
| Great Council of Chiefs' Nominees | Tevita Vakalalabure | |
| Great Council of Chiefs' Nominees | Livai Volavola | |
| Leader of the Opposition's Nominees | Chandra Prakash Bidesi | |
| Leader of the Opposition's Nominees | Bakshi Balwant Singh Mal | |
| Leader of the Opposition's Nominees | Ratilal Patel | Replaced by Subramani Basawaiya in 1979 |
| Leader of the Opposition's Nominees | Kaur Baltan Singh | |
| Leader of the Opposition's Nominees | Shiromaniam Madhavan | |
| Leader of the Opposition's Nominees | Colin Weaver | |
| Prime Minister's Nominees | Akanisi Dreunimisimisi | |
| Prime Minister's Nominees | John Falvey | Replaced by Wesley Barrett in 1979 |
| Prime Minister's Nominees | Ramanlal Kapadia | |
| Prime Minister's Nominees | Joeli Nacola | Replaced by Sevanaia Tabua in 1978 |
| Prime Minister's Nominees | Vijay R. Singh | Replaced by Andrew Deoki in 1979 |
| Prime Minister's Nominees | Beniram Rambissesar | Replaced by Faiz Sherani in 1979 |
Source: USP, USP
