= List of parliaments of Fiji =

This is a list of parliaments in Fiji.

Diagram	Assembly sessions	Election	From: To:	Governing party	Prime Minister	Official opposition party	Leader of the Opposition Party
		23rd general	10 October 1970 – 1972	Alliance Party	Ratu Sir Kamisese Mara	National Federation Party	Sidiq Koya
		24th general	1972 – 1977	Alliance Party	Ratu Sir Kamisese Mara	National Federation Party	Sidiq Koya
		25th general	April 1977 – June 1977	Alliance Party	Ratu Sir Kamisese Mara	National Federation Party	Jai Ram Reddy
		26th general	September 1977 – 1982	Alliance Party	Ratu Sir Kamisese Mara	National Federation Party	Jai Ram Reddy
		27th general	1982 – 1987	Alliance Party	Ratu Sir Kamisese Mara	National Federation Party	Jai Ram Reddy; Sidiq Koya; Harish Sharma
		28th general	1987 – 1987	NFP–Labour Coalition	Timoci Bavadra	Alliance Party	Ratu Sir Kamisese Mara
		29th general	1992 – 1994	SVT	Sitiveni Rabuka	National Federation Party	Jai Ram Reddy
		30th general	1994 – 1999	SVT	Sitiveni Rabuka	National Federation Party	Jai Ram Reddy
		31st general	1999 – 2000	Labour Party	Mahendra Chaudhry; Ratu Tevita Momoedonu	SVT	Ratu Inoke Kubuabola
		32nd general	2001 – 2006	SDL	Laisenia Qarase	National Federation Party; United Peoples Party; Labour Party	Prem Singh; Mick Beddoes; Mahendra Chaudhry
		33rd general	2006 – 2006	SDL	Laisenia Qarase	United Peoples Party	Mick Beddoes
		34th general	6 October 2014 – 30 September 2018	FijiFirst	Frank Bainimarama	SODELPA	Ro Teimumu Kepa
		35th general	26 November 2018 – 30 October 2022	FijiFirst	Frank Bainimarama	SODELPA	Sitiveni Rabuka; Ratu Naiqama Lalabalavu
		36th general	24 December 2022 – present	PAP–NFP–SODELPA Coalition	Sitiveni Rabuka	FijiFirst	Frank Bainimarama; Inia Seruiratu

== See also ==
- Parliament of Fiji
