= National Federation Party - Flower faction =

The Flower Faction was one of the factions of the National Federation Party (NFP) to contest the September 1977 elections in Fiji.

After A. D. Patel's death and the elevation to the leadership of Sidiq Koya, there had been dissent within the NFP. There were accusations of Koya stacking the party hierarchy with his supporters. R. D. Patel (younger brother of A.D. Patel) was the first to speak out against Koya even though Patel had been made the Speaker of the House of Representatives after the 1972 elections. He eventually resigned from the party and ran as an independent twice, but won neither election. K. C. Ramrakha was the second to openly express displeasure at Koya's leadership. He resigned his positions within the party but later withdrew his resignation.

Efforts were made to placate both sides with the splitting of the roles of the Leader of the party and the President. Koya retained the leadership and Irene Jai Narayan was made the President. Instead of healing the rift within the party, it made it worse, and in 1976 there was open confrontation between the two sides at public meetings. During the debate for amendments to the Agricultural Landlord and Tenants Act (ALTA), Koya and his supporters opposed the amendments, while the Narayan/Ramrakha faction supported it.

After mediation by S. B. Patel and Jai Ram Reddy, differences between the two sides were patched over for the March 1977 elections. The split in Fijian vote handed a surprise win to the NFP. While the NFP took four days to select a leader, the Governor General appointed a minority Alliance Government. It was alleged that some NFP members had asked the Governor General not to appoint Koya as the Prime Minister. The split reappeared after the election but this time with Jai Ram Reddy siding with the anti-Koya faction.

The two sides fielded parallel candidates for the September 1977 election with each claiming to be the official NFP. Both sides tried to use the official NFP symbol, a mango tree, for the election but the Supervisor of Elections refused to let any side use this symbol and finally allocated the dove as the symbol for the Koya faction and the flower symbol for the Narayan/Ramrakha/Reddy faction. In the election the Flower Faction only managed to win 13 seats (with 58.2 per cent of Indian communal votes) with Reddy defeating Koya for the Lautoka Indian communal seat.

During the election campaign, Irene Jai Narayan had promised Jai Ram Reddy the leadership of the Party if he defeated Koya. K.C. Ramrakha refused to accept Reddy's leadership and he and two of his supporters withdrew from the Flower faction and sat in the House as independents. Jai Ram Reddy became the Leader of the Opposition and the two factions again united prior to the 1982 elections.

Prominent members of the Flower faction were Jai Ram Reddy, Irene Jai Narayan, K. C. Ramrakha, Harish Sharma, Anirudh Kuver, Hargovind Lodhia, Isikeli Nadalo, Sarvan Singh, Atunaisa Maitoga and Julian Toganivalu.
