= 1977 Fijian constitutional crisis =

First major challenge to Fiji's democratic institutions

Fiji's parliamentary election of March 1977 precipitated a constitutional crisis, which was the first major challenge to the country's democratic institutions since independence in 1970.

Politics in the years before and after independence had been dominated by the conflicting interests of the ethnic Fijian and Indo-Fijian communities. At that time, Indo-Fijians slightly outnumbered ethnic Fijians, but by holding a virtual monopoly of the ethnic Fijian vote and by making significant inroads into the Indo-Fijian electorate (taking almost a quarter of their votes in the election of 1972), Ratu Sir Kamisese Mara's Alliance Party had maintained its grip on power. A split in the indigenous vote in 1977, however, resulted in a narrow win for the Indo-Fijian-dominated National Federation Party (NFP).

Sidiq Koya, the NFP leader, was expected to become Prime Minister.

Instead, the Governor-General, Ratu Sir George Cakobau, called on Mara to form a caretaker government, pending new elections scheduled for September. The events that led to his decision, and his reasons for it, are still mired in controversy, with different parties involved telling different versions of the situation, and conspiracy theories have abounded. What is known is that a leadership struggle immediately following the election seriously fractured the NFP. It failed to name a Cabinet for three days, and a crisis began to develop. A prominent NFP parliamentarian, Jai Ram Reddy, wondered aloud on national radio whether his party was ready to form a government, and whether it would in fact be able to do so. Ratu Mara claimed in his 1996 autobiography, The Pacific Way, that NFP politicians had approached him and asked him to remain in office, but with an NFP Cabinet; he claimed to have refused.

Some accused Jai Ram Reddy of sabotaging the formation of a government in order to challenge Koya for the leadership of the party, which he did successfully once NFP had been divided and Koya had been weakened in support. Other possible traitors within the NFP were also named. Fiji Labour Party leader Mahendra Chaudhry claimed in his 2004 book, "Children of the Indus", that parliamentarians Chand Ramrakha and Irene Jai Narayan had betrayed their own leader by telling the Governor-General that not all NFP caucus members would support Koya for Prime Minister. "There is also some basis to the story that Karam Ramrakha and Irene Jai Narayan had informed Ratu Sir George secretly that Koya did not enjoy the support of all NFP parliamentarians. Regrettably, at the hour of his triumph Koya had been stabbed in the back by his own people," he wrote. Ramrakha, now a lawyer based in Sydney, Australia, sued for defamation, saying that the claim was false and had damaged his reputation but was unsuccessful.

Others, both in Fiji and abroad, accused the Governor-General, a high chief in the Fijian chiefly hierarchy, of deliberate bias, and took his usurping of a popular election to preserve the government of his fellow-chief (and distant cousin), Ratu Mara, as an indication that the indigenous Fijian elite would not tolerate an Indo-Fijian-led government. Proponents of this theory point to the coups of 1987 and of 2000, both of which toppled governments dominated or led by Indo-Fijians, as evidence of their belief. Whether this controversial opinion is true or not, few doubt that Ratu Sir George Cakobau was pleased to be able to reappoint the government dominated by indigenous Fijians.

In a public statement, Ratu Sir George Cakobau defended his actions thus:

In the recent general election, the people of Fiji did not give a clear mandate to either of the major political parties. It therefore became the duty of the Governor-General under the Constitution to appoint as Prime Minister the Member of the House of Representatives who appeared to him best able to command the support of the majority of the Members of the House. The Governor-General has not been able to act sooner as it was not until this afternoon that he was informed who had been elected leader of the National Federation Party. The Governor-General, after taking all relevant circumstances into account, has come to the firm conclusion that the person best able to command support of the majority of the Members is the Leader of the Alliance Party, Ratu Sir Kamisese Mara. In compliance with the Constitution and acting in his own deliberate judgment the Governor-General has accordingly appointed Ratu Sir Kamisese as Prime Minister.

The September election called to resolve the impasse resulted in a landslide win for the Fijian Alliance, which remained in power for another decade.
