= List of members of the Parliament of Fiji (1994–1999) =

The members of the Parliament of Fiji from 1994 to 1999 consisted of members of the House of Representatives elected between 18 and 25 February 1994 and members of the appointed Senate.

== House of Representatives ==
Constituency	Member	Party
Fijian constituencies
Ba Provincial	Ovini Bokini	Soqosoqo ni Vakavulewa ni Taukei
Ba Provincial	Isimeli Bose	Soqosoqo ni Vakavulewa ni Taukei
Ba Provincial	Etuate Tavai	Soqosoqo ni Vakavulewa ni Taukei
Bua Provincial	Koresi Matatolu	Soqosoqo ni Vakavulewa ni Taukei
Bua Provincial	Kavaia Tagivetaua	Soqosoqo ni Vakavulewa ni Taukei
Cakaudrove Provincial	Inoke Kubuabola	Soqosoqo ni Vakavulewa ni Taukei
Cakaudrove Provincial	Sitiveni Rabuka	Soqosoqo ni Vakavulewa ni Taukei
Cakaudrove Provincial	Tevita Vakalalabure	Soqosoqo ni Vakavulewa ni Taukei
Kadavu Provincial	James Ah Koy	Soqosoqo ni Vakavulewa ni Taukei
Kadavu Provincial	Apatia Seru	Soqosoqo ni Vakavulewa ni Taukei
Lau Provincial	Viliame Cavubati	Soqosoqo ni Vakavulewa ni Taukei
Lau Provincial	Finau Mara	Fijian Association Party
Lau Provincial	Viliame Tunidau	Fijian Association Party
Lomaiviti Provincial	Joeli Kalou	Fijian Association Party
Lomaiviti Provincial	Maraia Vakatale	Soqosoqo ni Vakavulewa ni Taukei
Macuata Provincial	Militini Leweniqula	Soqosoqo ni Vakavulewa ni Taukei
Macuata Provincial	Rusiate Musudroka	Soqosoqo ni Vakavulewa ni Taukei
Nadroga and Navosa Provincial	Seruwaia Hong-Tiy	Soqosoqo ni Vakavulewa ni Taukei
Nadroga and Navosa Provincial	Sakiusa Matuku	Soqosoqo ni Vakavulewa ni Taukei
Naitasiri Provincial	Fereti Dewa	Fijian Association Party
Naitasiri Provincial	Ilai Kuli	Fijian Association Party
Namosi Provincial	Mesake Baisagale	Soqosoqo ni Vakavulewa ni Taukei
Namosi Provincial	Kiniviliame Manumanuitoga	Soqosoqo ni Vakavulewa ni Taukei
North East Urban	Josefa Dimuri	Soqosoqo ni Vakavulewa ni Taukei
Ra Provincial	Wilisoni Tuiketei Malani	Soqosoqo ni Vakavulewa ni Taukei
Ra Provincial	Joeli Nacola	Independent
Rewa Provincial	Atunaiasa Druavesi	Soqosoqo ni Vakavulewa ni Taukei
Rewa Provincial	Berenado Vunibobo	Soqosoqo ni Vakavulewa ni Taukei
Serua Provincial	Atunaisa Lacabuka	Soqosoqo ni Vakavulewa ni Taukei
Serua Provincial	Mesulame Narawa	Soqosoqo ni Vakavulewa ni Taukei
Serua/Rewa West Urban	Kelemedi Bulewa	Soqosoqo ni Vakavulewa ni Taukei
Suva City Urban	Jonetani Kaukimoce	Soqosoqo ni Vakavulewa ni Taukei
Tailevu Provincial	Litia Cakobau	Soqosoqo ni Vakavulewa ni Taukei
Tailevu Provincial	Sam Speight	Soqosoqo ni Vakavulewa ni Taukei
Tailevu Provincial	Timoci Vesikula	Soqosoqo ni Vakavulewa ni Taukei
Tailevu/Naitasiri Urban	Apolosi Biuvakaloloma	Soqosoqo ni Vakavulewa ni Taukei
Western Urban	Vilisoni Cagimaivei	Soqosoqo ni Vakavulewa ni Taukei
Indo-Fijian constituencies
Ba East/Tavua Rural	Hardayal Singh	Fiji Labour Party
Ba Urban	Vinod Patel	National Federation Party
Ba West	Mahendra Chaudhry	Fiji Labour Party
Bua	Raman Pratap Singh	National Federation Party
Cakaudrove	Satish Chandra Gulabdas	National Federation Party
Cuvu/Malomalo South/Sigatoka Urban	Mohammed Azam Khalil	National Federation Party
Labasa	Shree Ramlu	National Federation Party
Lami/Naitasiri South/Kadavu	Shiu Charan	National Federation Party
Lautoka City	Ali Ayub Husain	National Federation Party
Lautoka Rural	Jai Ram Reddy	National Federation Party
Lautoka South/Veiseisei/Yasawa	Vinod Maharaj	Fiji Labour Party
Macuata East	Parmod Chand	National Federation Party
Macuata West	Charan Jeath Singh	National Federation Party
Magodro/Ba Rural	Krishna Datt	Fiji Labour Party
Malomalo North/Nadi Rural	Harish Chandra Sharma	National Federation Party
Nadi Urban	Dorsami Naidu	National Federation Party
Nadroga East	Lekh Ram Vayeshnoi	Fiji Labour Party
Nasinu East/Rewa East	Harnam Singh Golian	National Federation Party
Nasinu North/Nausori	Narendra Arjun	National Federation Party
Nasinu South/Colo-i-Suva	Sayed Abdul Khaiyum	National Federation Party
Navosa/Serua/Namosi/Naitasiri West/Rewa West	Maan Singh	National Federation Party
Nawaka/Sabeto	Shiu Sharan Sharma	Fiji Labour Party
Ra Central	Dhirendra Kumar	National Federation Party
Suva City Central	Harilal Manilal Patel	National Federation Party
Suva City Suburban	James Raghwan Raman	National Federation Party
Tailevu/Ra East/Lomaiviti/Lau/Rotuma	Aptar Singh	National Federation Party
Tavua/Ra West	Anand Babla	Fiji Labour Party
General constituencies
Ba/Nadroga and Navosa	David Pickering	All Nationals Congress
Northern	Leo Smith	General Voters Party
Ra/Tailevu/Lomiviti/Lau/Rotuma/Naitasiri North	Vincent Lobendahn	General Voters Party
Serua/Namosi/Rewa/Kadavu/Naitasiri South	Harold Powell	General Voters Party
Suva City	Bill Aull	General Voters Party
Rotuma
Rotuma	Paul Manueli	Independent
Speaker
Speaker	Apenisa Kurisaqila	
Source: Fiji Elections
