= Harilal Manilal Patel =

Fiji Indian lawyer and politician

Member of House of Representatives (Fiji) Suva City Indian Communal Constituency
- In office 1987–1987
- Preceded by: Irene Jai Narayan
- Succeeded by: Constitution abrogated

Suva City Central Indian Constituency
- In office 1994–1999
- Succeeded by: New Constitution

Personal details
- Born: 1941 (age 84–85) Suva, Fiji
- Party: National Federation Party
- Profession: Lawyer

Harilal Manilal Patel (born 1941) is a Fiji Indian lawyer who has also been a member of the House of Representatives of Fiji.

He was born in Suva, Fiji and after completing his law degree from the University of Auckland in 1968, started working with K. C. Ramrakha and set up his own law firm in 1977. He has served as President of the Suva branch of the National Federation Party (NFP) was a member of the Suva City Council. He was a founding member of NFP Youth and unsuccessfully contested the 1977 general election as NFP-Flower Faction candidate.

For the 1987 general election, the NFP–Labour Coalition chose him as a candidate for the South City Communal Constituency which he won easily, but was a member of Parliament for a month when the military coup of 1987 put a temporary halt to his political career. In the 1994 elections, he stood as an NFP candidate for the Suva City Central Indian Constituency and won easily.
