= Shiromaniam Madhavan =

Fijian politician

Member of House of Representatives (Fiji) Labasa Indian Constituency
- In office 1992–1994fac
- Preceded by: New Constitution
- Succeeded by: Shree Ramlu

Personal details
- Born: 1944 Labasa, Fiji
- Died: 29 June 1994 (aged 49–50) Fiji
- Party: National Federation Party, Alliance Party, Fiji Labour Party

Shiromaniam Madhavan (1944 – 29 June 1994), son of a founding member of the National Federation Party (NFP), was a Fiji Indian politician who served in the Labasa Town Council and the House of Representatives. He contested numerous elections for different political parties.

He was born in Labasa, Fiji and was the son of the well known Vanua Levu politician, James Madhavan, who served in the Legislative Council of Fiji for a long time. He was a founder of the Air Pacific Employees' Association in the 1960s, serving as its Secretary and President. He had been active in politics since 1963 and was elected to the Labasa Town Council in 1973 and elected mayor in 1978. In 1982 he was again elected to the council as an independent.

He was nominated to the Senate by the Leader of the Opposition in 1974. In the September 1977 election, he supported the Dove Faction of the NFP led by Sidiq Koya. In the 1987 general election, he stood as an Alliance candidate for the Labasa/Bua Indian Communal Constituency which he lost by a large margin to his NFP–Labour Coalition opponent.

Madhavan then joined the Fiji Labour Party and won the Labasa Indian Constituency in the 1992 general election. He lost this seat in the 1994 general election to his NFP opponent who had been a lifelong friend Mr Shree Ramlu. This had caused a lot of strife but Mr Madhavan fought till the end even though he was in hospital. His elder son Prameshwaran and daughter Vijay Madhavan carried his election hope as he was hospitalised during the election.

He died on 29 June 1994 after a long illness. He was survived by his 5 children, namely, Vijay Latchmi Shardaanjali Madhavan, Prameshwaran Shiromaniam Madhavan, Vanita Vilashni Madhavan, Pratibha Priyadarshani Madhavan and Vinay James Madhavan.
