= Julian Toganivalu =

Fijian chief, civil servant and politician

Member of the House of Representatives
- In office 1977
- Preceded by: Timoci Naco
- Succeeded by: Koresi Matatolu
- Constituency: North-Western Fijian National

Personal details
- Born: 1932
- Died: 5 December 1977 (aged 45)
- Party: NFP–Flower

Ratu Julian Nasaroa Brown Toganivalu (1932 – 5 December 1977) was a Fijian chief, civil servant and politician. He was a member of the House of Representatives for three days in 1977.

== Biography ==
Toganivalu was the third son of Legislative Council member Ratu George Toganivalu, and Alice Irene Toganivalu (née Miller).

He enlisted in the Fijian Military Forces and at the age of 19 became the first Fijian to attend the Royal Military Academy Sandhurst. He later worked as a civil servant and was seconded to Nauru, where he was appointed chief executive of the Local Government Council.

In 1968 Toganivalu resigned from the civil service to join the Indo-Fijian-dominated Federation Party, becoming its organising secretary. He subsequently became a member of its successor, the National Federation Party. Toganivalu was elected to the House of Representatives as a member of the Flower faction of the party in the September 1977 elections. He was proposed as Leader of the Opposition by K. C. Ramrakha, but Jai Ram Reddy was appointed instead. He died in December the same year only three days after being sworn into office.
