= Shiu Narayan Kanhai =

Member of the House of Representatives
- In office 1977–1982
- Preceded by: Chandra Pillai
- Succeeded by: Satendra Nandan
- Constituency: Nasinu–Vunidawa Indo-Fijian Communal
- In office 1977
- Preceded by: K. S. Reddy
- Succeeded by: K. S. Reddy
- Constituency: South-Eastern Indo-Fijian National

Personal details
- Born: 1932 Nadi, Fiji
- Died: 27 March 1982 (aged 49) Suva, Fiji
- Party: National Federation Party

Shiu Narayan Kanhai (1932 – 27 March 1982) was an Indo-Fijian teacher, trade unionist and politician. He served as a member of the House of Representatives between 1977 and 1982.

== Biography ==
Kanhai was born in 1932 in Nadi. After graduating from university, he worked as a teacher. He became headteacher of the Assemblies of God Primary School in 1962, and three years later he was appointed head of the Assemblies of God high school. He later became general secretary of the Fiji Teachers Union, and was a member of the World Confederation of Organizations of the Teaching Profession.

He contested the 1966 elections to the Legislative Council as an independent candidate, finishing fourth in a field of six. In the March 1977 elections he stood as a National Federation Party (NFP) candidate in the South-Eastern Indo-Fijian national constituency and was elected to the House of Representatives after unseating the incumbent Alliance Party MP K. S. Reddy. When the NFP split, he joined the Dove faction and was re-elected in the Nasinu–Vunidawa Indo-Fijian communal constituency in the September 1977 elections.

He died in Suva in March 1982 after suffering a heart attack, survived by his wife Madhvi and their five children and three other children.
