= Sarvan Singh =

Indo-Fijian lawyer and politician

Member of the House of Representatives
- In office 1977–1979
- Preceded by: Ram Jati Singh
- Succeeded by: Mohammed Sadiq
- Constituency: Labasa–Bua
- In office 1974–1977
- Preceded by: James Madhavan
- Succeeded by: Santa Singh
- Constituency: Savusavu–Macuata East

Member of the Senate
- In office 1970–1974
- Succeeded by: Shiromaniam Madhavan

Personal details
- Born: Labasa, Fiji
- Died: 1979 (aged 45)
- Party: National Federation Party

Sarvan Singh (died 1979) was an Indo-Fijian lawyer and politician. He served as a member of the Senate and House of Representatives from 1970 until his death.

== Biography ==
Born in Labasa, Singh became a solicitor. He joined the National Federation Party and was appointed to the Senate in 1970 as one of the Leader of the Opposition's nominees. He remained in the Senate until 1974, when he successfully contested a by-election for the Savusavu–Macuata East constituency of the House of Representatives following the death of James Madhavan, and became a member of the lower house. He was subsequently re-elected in the March 1977 from the Labasa–Bua constituency. When the party split prior to the September 1977 elections he became part of the Flower faction.

He died in early 1979.
