= 1977 general election =

1977 general election may refer to:

- 1977 Australian federal election
- 1977 Danish general election
- 1977 Dutch general election
- March 1977 Fijian general election
- September 1977 Fijian general election
- 1977 Greek legislative election
- 1977 Indian general election
- 1977 Irish general election
- 1977 Israeli legislative election
- 1977 Northern Territory general election
- 1977 Norwegian parliamentary election
- 1977 Queensland state election
- 1977 Rhodesian general election
- 1977 Spanish general election
- 1977 Western Australian state election
