= Leader of the Opposition (Fiji) =

Parliamentary position of Fiji

Leader of the Opposition of the Republic of Fiji
- Coat of arms of the Republic of Fiji

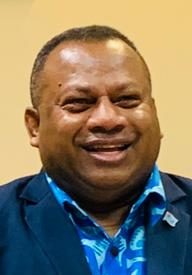
- Incumbent; Inia Seruiratu since 29 March 2023
- Term length: While leader of the largest political party in Parliament that is not in government
- Inaugural holder: Sidiq Koya
- Formation: 10 October 1970

In Fiji, the leader of the opposition (or opposition leader) is a senior politician who commands the support of the Official Opposition. The leader of the opposition is, by convention, the leader of the largest political party in the Parliament of Fiji that is not in government. This is usually this is the parliamentary leader of the second-largest caucus in Parliament. It did not originate in Fiji but has a long tradition; in British constitutional theory, the leader of the opposition must pose a formal alternative to the government, ready to form a government himself should the prime minister lose the confidence of the parliament.

Typically the leader of the opposition is elected by his or her party according to its rules. A new leader may be elected when the incumbent dies, resigns, or is challenged for the leadership. Inia Seruiratu of the FijiFirst party (independent since 2024) has been serving as the leader of the opposition since 29 March 2023.

== Description of the office ==
The leader of the opposition is chosen by a vote of all members of Parliament who declare that they do not support the government. But before the adoption of the 2013 Constitution, the leader of the opposition was formally appointed by the president. The appointment was not at the president's personal discretion, however, as he was required by the Constitution to appoint the person most acceptable to the majority of the opposition (defined as members of the House of Representatives who belong to political parties not represented in the Cabinet). In theory, that meant the parliamentary leader of the largest Opposition party. In practice, the person most eligible could decline the office, as was the case between 2001 and 2004, when Mahendra Chaudhry, whose Labour Party held 28 of the 30 Opposition seats in the House of Representatives, adamantly refused to accept the position of leader of the opposition, insisting that he and his party wanted representation in the Cabinet instead. Until he reversed his position late in 2004 (following the collapse of negotiations with Prime Minister Qarase), this forced the president to appoint Mick Beddoes, the sole parliamentary representative of the United General Party, as leader of the opposition.

Under the 1997 Constitution, the leader of the opposition chose 8 of the 32 members of the Senate, Fiji's upper house of Parliament, and had the right to be consulted about the appointment of the chief justice.

== List of leaders of the opposition in Fiji (1970–present) ==
No.	Portrait	Leader	Took office	Left office	Time in office	Party	Election	Prime minister(s)
1	Sidiq Koya	Sidiq Koya (1924–1993)	1970	1977	6–7 years	NFP	1972; 1977 (Mar)	Mara
2	Jai Ram Reddy	Jai Ram Reddy (1937–2022)	1977	1984	6–7 years	NFP	1977 (Sep); 1982	Mara
(1)	Sidiq Koya	Sidiq Koya (1924–1993)	1984	1987	2–3 years	NFP	—	Mara
3	Harish Sharma	Harish Sharma (born 1932)	1987	1987	0 years	NFP	—	Mara
4	Kamisese Mara	Ratu Sir; Kamisese Mara (1920–2004)	13 April 1987	14 May 1987	31 days	Alliance	1987	Bavadra
Vacant (14 May 1987 – 3 April 1992)
(2)	Jai Ram Reddy	Jai Ram Reddy (1937–2022)	3 April 1992	28 August 1999	7 years, 147 days	NFP	1992; 1994	Rabuka
5	Inoke Kubuabola	Ratu; Inoke Kubuabola (born 1948)	28 August 1999	3 October 2000	1 year, 36 days	SVT	1999	Chaudhry; Momoedonu
Vacant (3 October 2000 – 3 July 2001)
6	Prem Singh	Prem Singh	3 July 2001	17 April 2002	288 days	NFP	2001	Qarase
7	Mick Beddoes	Mick Beddoes	17 April 2002	21 November 2004	2 years, 218 days	UPP	—	Qarase
8	Mahendra Chaudhry	Mahendra Chaudhry (born 1942)	21 November 2004	3 June 2006	1 year, 194 days	Labour	—	Qarase
(7)	Mick Beddoes	Mick Beddoes	3 June 2006	5 December 2006	185 days	UPP	2006	Qarase
Vacant (5 December 2006 – 6 October 2014)
9	Teimumu Kepa	Ro; Teimumu Kepa (born 1945)	6 October 2014	20 November 2018	4 years, 45 days	SODELPA	2014	Bainimarama
10	Sitiveni Rabuka	Major general (Rtd); Sitiveni Rabuka (born 1948)	26 November 2018 (Note: Suspended from 26 May to 29 June 2020.)	7 December 2020	2 years, 11 days	SODELPA	2018	Bainimarama
11	Naiqama Lalabalavu	Ratu; Naiqama Lalabalavu (born 1953)	8 December 2020	24 December 2022	2 years, 16 days	SODELPA	—	Bainimarama
12	Frank Bainimarama	Rear admiral (Rtd); Frank Bainimarama (born 1954)	24 December 2022	8 March 2023	74 days	FijiFirst	2022	Rabuka
13	Inia Seruiratu	Inia Seruiratu	29 March 2023	Incumbent	3 years, 206 days	PFP (FijiFirst 2023–24)	—	Rabuka

== See also ==
- List of political parties in Fiji
- House of Representatives of Fiji
