= 1977 Fijian general election =

There were two general elections held in Fiji in 1977:

- March 1977 Fijian general election
- September 1977 Fijian general election
