= Chandra Prakash Sharma =

Indo-Fijian civil servant and politician

Member of the House of Representatives
- In office 1977
- Preceded by: Vijay Parmanandam
- Succeeded by: Vijay Parmanandam
- Constituency: Suva Rural

Personal details
- Died: 1979 Melbourne, Australia
- Party: National Federation Party

Chandra Prakash Sharma (died 1979) was an Indo-Fijian civil servant and politician. He briefly served as a member of the House of Representatives in 1977.

== Biography ==
Sharma studied at the University of Otago until he was deported, later qualifying as a chartered accountant and joined the civil service, where he became chief accountant at the Treasury. In the early 1970s he was seconded from the Ministry of Finance to the Savings Bank of Fiji. He also served as president of the Fiji Public Servants' Association.

A member of the National Federation Party, he contested the Suva Rural seat in the March 1977 elections and defeated incumbent (and former NFP member) Vijay Parmanandam and Vijay R. Singh. However, following the party's split later in the year, he did not run for re-election in the September 1977 elections.

He died in Melbourne in 1979. His son Neil later also served as an MP.
