= Fijian literature =

Among the first published works of Fijian literature, in the late 1960s and early 1970s, were Vivekanand Sharma (in Hindi), Raymond Pillai's and Subramani's short stories (in English) and Pio Manoa's poetry (in English and in Fijian). The emergence of Fiji's written literature (as distinct from oral literature) coincides with the country's transition to independence in 1970.

Dr Vivekanand Sharma wrote several novels such as "To An Unknown Horizon" (Anjaan Kshitij ki Ore), "The Waves of the Pacific" (Prashant Ki Laherein). He made several radio plays, established schools and promoted Hindi in various levels in Fiji. He has been awarded by the Government of India, Mauritius and locally by the Sanatan Pratinidhi Sabha of Fiji for his immense contribution in Fiji literature.

In 1968, the founding of the University of the South Pacific, whose main campus has been in Fiji's capital Suva, provided a stimulus for Fijian (and, more widely, Pacific Islander) literature. Creative writing courses and workshops were set up. The South Pacific Arts Society was founded at the university in 1973, and published Pacific Islander literature (poetry and short stories) in the magazine Pacific Islands Monthly. In 1974, the Society founded the publishing house Mana Publications, followed in 1976 by the art and literature journal Mana. The journal published anthologies of Fijian poetry. Playwright Vilsoni Hereniko's work also began to appear in this print at this time.

Among Fiji's most noted writers are Satendra Nandan, author of poetry, short stories and the semi-autobiographical novel The Wounded Sea, published in 1991. Fiji poet Sudesh Mishra "combines classical Indian poetic forms with an English peppered with Hindi and Fijian words"; his collections of poems include Tandava (1992) and Rahu (1997). Larry Thomas is a contemporary playwright and director. His 1998 play The Anniversary Present has been described as "captur[ing] the words and rhythms and creative power of the basilectal 'Fiji English' many of his marginalised characters speak: the young, the unemployed, disempowered women and men". Joseph Veramo is a contemporary novelist, whose works include the novel Moving Through the Streets (1994), the children's book The Shark, and Black Messiah, a collection published in 1989 which includes short stories and a novella.

== Sources ==
- "English in the South Pacific", John Lynch and France Mugler, University of the South Pacific
