= K. C. Ramrakha =

Fiji Indian lawyer, union leader, and politician (1933–2021)

Karam Chand Ramrakha
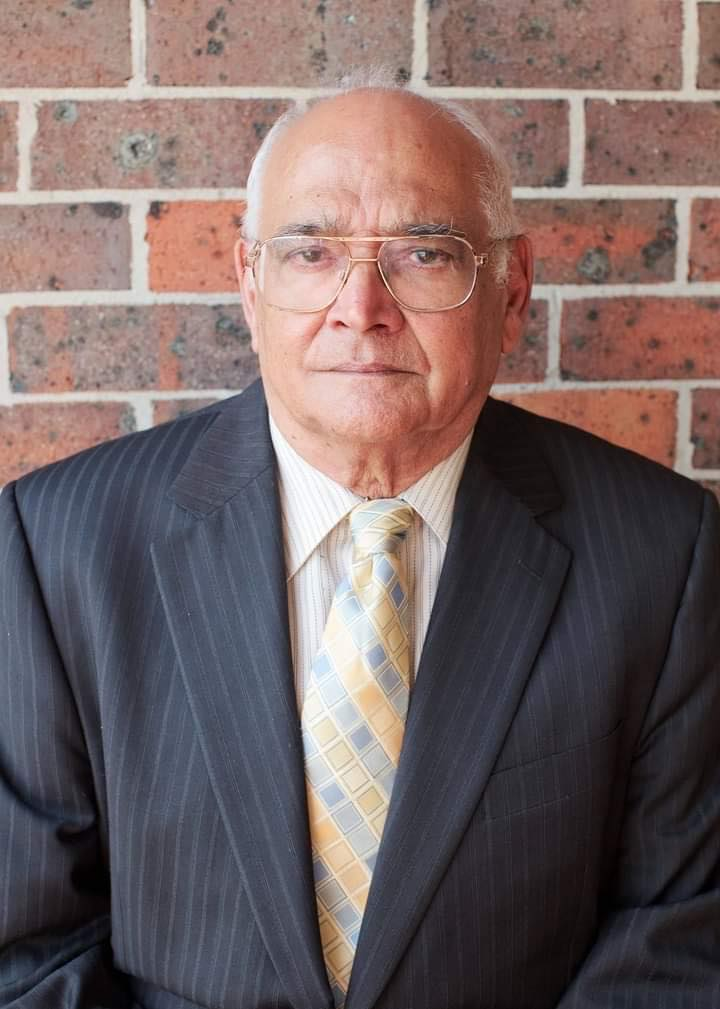

Member of Legislative Council (Fiji) Nausori Tailevu Constituency
- In office 1966–1972

Member of House of Representatives (Fiji) Nausori Levuka Constituency
- In office 1972–1982

Opposition Whip (Fiji)
- In office 1966–1977

Personal details
- Born: 18 March 1933 Nabouwalu, Fiji
- Died: 17 April 2021 (aged 88) Sydney, Australia
- Party: National Federation Party (Fiji)
- Profession: Lawyer
- He was also President of Fiji Teachers Union from 1967 to 1973

Karam Chand Ramrakha (18 March 1933 – 17 April 2021) was a former Fiji Indian lawyer, union leader and politician, who served in colonial Fiji's Legislative Council and independent Fiji's House of Representatives from 1966 to 1982.

== Entry into politics ==
K.C. Ramrakha joined the Federation Party when its support was concentrated in the sugar cane growing districts of Fiji. One of the four Indian members of the Legislative Council (Andrew Deoki, representing the Southern Constituency which included the districts of Suva, Navua, Nausori and Tailevu in the Central Division elected in 1963 was not a member of the Federation Party). In the 1966 election, A. D. Patel recruited Ramrakha as one of the candidates (the other was Irene Jai Narayan) to extend NFP's support into the Central Division. Ramrakha's main opponent was K. B. Singh, a veteran politician who had first entered the Legislative Council in 1937. Ramrakha easily defeated Singh by 3,220 votes to 677 votes with a third candidate receiving 604 votes.

== Leadership contender ==
Ramrakha soon proved himself to be an accomplished debator and was rewarded for his skills by being made the Opposition Whip in the Legislative Council. He was also elected the General Secretary of the Fiji Teachers Union. In 1969, he aided A. D. Patel in the Court of Arbitration appointed for the new sugar cane contract. When A. D. Patel died in 1969, many people thought that Ramrakha was a suitable person to take up the leadership of the National Federation Party (NFP), but the Party chose Sidiq Koya instead. After the 1972 elections, his relationship with Koya worsened and he resigned as General Secretary of the party and opposition whip in September 1972. However, he later withdrew his resignation.

== 1977 constitutional crisis ==
By 1976, the NFP was beginning to split into two factions and Ramrakha was seen to be Koya's main opponent. After the NFP patched up its differences and won the election of March 1977, Ramrakha's opposition to Koya's leadership was one of the reasons for the delay in NFP attempting to form Government. By the time elections were held again in September 1977, the NFP had split into two factions and Ramrakha became a prominent member of the Flower faction, opposed to Koya's Dove faction. Ramrakha was seen as the natural leader of the Flower faction, but Irene Jai Narayan (another Flower faction leader), without consulting others, announced during the campaign that if Jai Ram Reddy defeated Koya in the Lautoka Indian Constituency, he would become the leader.

Jai Ram Reddy did defeat Koya and became the new leader of the opposition and later the leader of a reunified NFP. Ramrakha showed his disappointment by sitting as an independent member for the rest of the parliamentary term. He did not contest the 1982 election and migrated to Australia.

== Lawsuit against Mahendra Chaudhry ==
Pacific Media Watch reported on 7 September 2004 that Ramrakha had announced his intention to sue former Prime Minister Mahendra Chaudhry. Ramrakha's grievance was related to allegations made by Chaudhry in his autobiography, Children of the Indus, that Ramrakha and Narayan had advised Governor General Ratu Sir George Cakobau against appointing Koya as Prime Minister after the NFP's electoral victory, saying that Koya did not have the support of the whole NFP caucus. Ramrakha said that the allegations were false and had damaged his reputation.

== Fiji Teachers Union President ==
He was elected the President of the Fiji Teachers Union, being the first non-teacher to hold this position. His election and his leading role in the National Federation Party caused the Fijian Teachers Association (a second teachers union representing ethnic Fijians) to withdraw from negotiations for amalgamation of the two unions.
