= National Federation Party - Dove faction =

Political party faction active in 1977

The Dove Faction was one of the factions of the National Federation Party (NFP) to contest the September 1977 elections in Fiji.

Ever since the death of A. D. Patel and the elevation to the leadership of Sidiq Koya, there had been dissent within the NFP. There were accusations of Koya stacking the party hierarchy with his supporters. R. D. Patel (younger brother of A.D. Patel) was the first to speak out against Koya even though Patel had been made the Speaker of the House of Representatives after the 1972 elections. He eventually resigned from the Party and twice (unsuccessfully) contested elections against the NFP as an independent. K. C. Ramrakha was the next one to openly express displeasure at Koya's style of leadership. He resigned his positions within the Party but later withdrew his resignation.

Efforts were made to placate both sides with the splitting of the roles of the Leader of the party and the President. Koya retained the leadership and Irene Jai Narayan was made the President. This, instead of healing the rift within the Party, made it worse and in 1976 there was open confrontation between the two sides at public meetings. During the debate for amendments to the Agricultural Landlord and Tenants Act (ALTA), Koya and his supporters opposed the amendments, while the Narayan/Ramrakha faction supported it.

After mediation by S. B. Patel and Jai Ram Reddy, differences between the two sides were patched over for the March 1977 elections. The split in Fijian vote handed a surprise win to the NFP. While the NFP took four days to select a leader, the Governor General appointed a minority Alliance Government. It was alleged that some NFP members had asked the Governor General not to appoint Koya as the Prime Minister. The split reappeared after the election but this time with Jai Ram Reddy siding with the anti-Koya faction.

The two sides fielded parallel candidates for the September 1977 election with each claiming to be the official NFP. Both sides tried to use the official NFP symbol, a mango tree, for the election but the Supervisor of Elections refused to let any side use this symbol and finally allocated the dove as the symbol for the Koya faction and the flower symbol for the Narayan/Ramrakha/Reddy faction. In the election, the Dove Faction only won three seats with Koya himself losing to Reddy.

Prominent members of the Dove faction were Sidiq Koya, Ram Jati Singh, Ujagar Singh, Surendra Prasad, Sharda Nand, Vijay Parmanandam, C. A. Shah, Apisai Tora, C.S. Pillay, and Edmund March.
