= Shree Ramlu =

Fijian politician

Member of House of Representatives (Fiji) Labasa Indian Communal Constituency
- In office 1994–1994

Personal details
- Born: Labasa
- Died: 1994
- Party: National Federation Party

Shree Ramlu was a Fiji Indian politician who won the Labasa Indian Communal seat for the National Federation Party in the 1994 general election.

He died a few months later.
