= Chandra Prakash Bidesi =

Indo-Fijian businessman and politician

Member of the Senate
- In office 1976–1982

Personal details
- Born: 22 November 1922 Suva, Fiji
- Died: 12 May 1988 (aged 65) Suva, Fiji

Chandra Prakash Bidesi OBE (22 November 1922 – 12 May 1988) was an Indo-Fijian businessman and politician. He was the son of a Indo-Fijian business man who was one of the pioneers responsible for the development of Suva City. Mr Bidesi served as a member of the Senate from 1976 to 1982.

== Biography ==
Mr Bidesi was born in the Muanivatu area of Suva in November 1922 and was educated at Muanivatu Indian School and St Columbas Claudius Memorial School. He married Ram Kuar, daughter of a prominent business man in Suva and they had six children.

He was elected to Suva City Council in 1952. Although he lost his seat in 1954, he regained it in 1956 and remained a councillor until 1976. He served as president of the Fiji Industrial Workers' Congress from 1957 to 1959 and then as vice-president from 1960 to 1962, and was also president of the Fiji Taxi Union for six years. He contested the Southern Indo-Fijian seat in the 1963 general elections, but finished fourth out of five candidates.

After the National Federation Party was created in the late 1960s, Mr Bidesi became a member. He served as Deputy Mayor of Suva from 1967 to 1968, and was a candidate in the mayoral election in 1974, but was defeated by Navin Maharaj. In 1976 he was appointed to the Senate as one of the nominees of the Leader of the Opposition Sidiq Koya, becoming leader of the National Federation Party. He remained in the Senate until 1982. Mr Bidesi was awarded an OBE in the 1984 New Year Honours.

Mr Bidesi died in the Colonial War Memorial Hospital in Suva in May 1988 after a long battle with leukaemia. He was survived by his wife and six children.
