= A. H. Sahu Khan =

Fijian politician

Nominated Member of the Legislative Council
- In office 1957–1963
- Preceded by: A. R. Manu

Nadi Township Board Chairman
- In office 1967–1970
- Succeeded by: H. M. Lodhia

Personal details
- Born: 8 June 1918 Suva, Fiji
- Died: 29 August 2007 (aged 89) Sydney, Australia
- Spouse: Chand Sahu Khan
- Children: 5

Dr. Abdul Habib Sahu Khan (8 June 1918 – 29 August 2007) served two terms as an Indian nominated member of the Legislative Council of Fiji from 1957 to 1963. His brother Abdul Rahman was also an MLC during the 1940s.

== Biography ==
Dr. Sahu Khan was born on 8 June 1918 in Suva, Fiji. In 1934, he left for New Zealand to complete his education, where was accepted into the University of Otago Dunedin School of Medicine shortly after, and became a doctor. He joined the Royal New Zealand Army Medical Corps after the beginning of World War 2, and earned 2 service medals. He returned to Fiji in 1946, where he was welcomed in the Suva City Town Hall.

He is credited with proposing the idea of the South Pacific Games during the 1959 South Pacific Conference in Rabaul, Papua New Guinea which led to the first games in Fiji in 1963.

In 1962, Alick Downer, the Australian Minister for Immigration at the time, invited Dr. Sahu Khan and his family to become citizens of Australia, to which he accepted, and moved to Sydney, where he lived the rest of his life.

He introduced the Nadi Township Board electoral system in 1967, and was the first elected chairman.

Sahu Khan died in Sydney, Australia on 29 August 2007, and was buried in Rookwood Cemetery.
