= Fijian Nationalist Party =

Political party of Fiji

The Fijian Nationalist Party (FNP) was a nationalist political party in Fiji.

== History ==
The party was established on 19 January 1974 by MP Sakeasi Butadroka after he had been expelled from the Alliance Party. Using its slogan 'Fiji for the Fijian', it called for the abolition of the common roll and two-thirds of seats in parliament to be reserved for Fijians.

Its support peaked in the March 1977 general elections, when it received 5.3% of the vote. Although it won only one seat in the 52-member House of Representatives, most of its votes came at the expense of the Alliance, allowing the Indo-Fijian-dominated National Federation Party to become the largest party in the House and precipitating a constitutional crisis. Early elections were held in September 1977, in which the party lost its only seat and saw its vote share halved.

After failing to win a seat in elections in 1982 and 1987, in 1992 the party was renamed the Fijian Nationalist United Front Party won three seats in the elections that year. However, it lost all three seats in the 1994 elections.

In the late 1990s, the FNUFP merged with the Vanua Tako Lavo Party, which shared its strong opposition to the 1997 constitution. The merged party, known as the Nationalist Vanua Tako Lavo Party, was implicated by Maciu Navakasuasua, who was convicted of offences related to the Fiji coup of 2000, in the planning of the coup which deposed the elected government of Prime Minister Mahendra Chaudhry.
