= H. M. Lodhia =

Fijian politician

Fijian House of Representatives (Indo-Fijian Communal)
- In office 1972–1985

Nadi Township Board Chairman
- In office 1970–1972
- Preceded by: A. H. Sahu Khan

Nadi Town Council Mayor
- In office 1972–1973

Personal details
- Born: Nadi, Fiji
- Party: National Federation Party
- Children: Chandrakant Lodhia, NFP treasurer

Hargovind Madhavji Lodhia served as a member of the Parliament of Fiji from 1972 to 1985, chairman of the Township Board of Nadi, and was the first mayor of the Nadi Town Council. He was awarded an MBE (Member of the Order of the British Empire) in the 1971 Birthday Honours, for services to the community.

== Political career ==
Lodhia was elected chairman of the Nadi Township Board in 1970, succeeding A. H. Sahu Khan, until the Local Government Act of 1972, which replaced the board with the Nadi Town Council. He became mayor of the town council in 1972 and served until the end of his term in December 1973. Lodhia won every parliamentary election since 1972, until in December 1985, when he resigned from the National Federation Party (NFP) in protest of S. M. Koya's leadership.
