= Bakshi Balwant Singh Mal =

Indo-Fijian businessman and politician (d1986)

Member of the Senate
- In office 1976–1982

Personal details
- Died: 6 January 1986 Suva, Fiji

Bakshi Balwant Singh Mal MBE (died 6 January 1986) was an Indo-Fijian businessman and politician.

== Biography ==
Mal immigrated to Fiji in the mid-1930s after finishing college in Punjab, later earning a degree at Victoria University in Wellington. He took over his uncle's aerated water factory and subsequently became an estate agent and property developer.

A Sikh, he served as president of the Samabula Gurudanor and was involved with building the Samabula Sikh temple in Suva. He also helped found Deenhandhu Primary School and the Indian High School and served as a governor of Indian College. He was awarded an MBE in the 1966 New Year Honours.

Having been being heavily involved in the establishment of the Federation Party in 1964, he was appointed to the Senate as one of the nominees of Leader of the Opposition Sidiq Koya in 1976, serving until 1982. He died in Suva in January 1986 at the age of 67.
