= 1992 Fijian general election =

← 1987	23–30 May 1992	1994 →

All 70 seats in the House of Representatives 35 seats needed for a majority
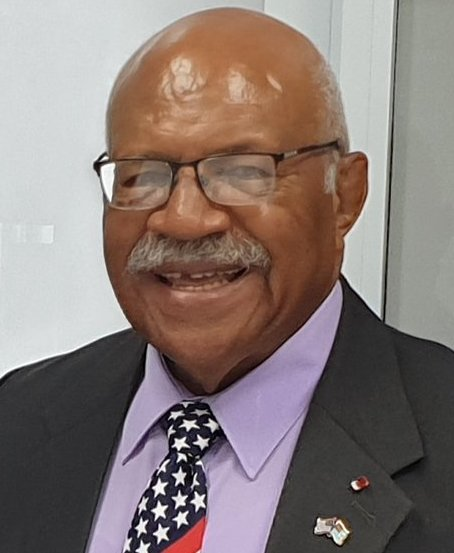

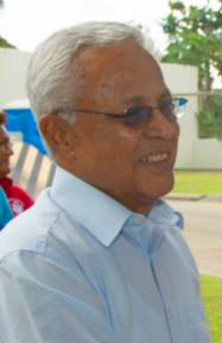

	First party	Second party
		NFP
Leader	Sitiveni Rabuka	Harish Sharma
Party	SVT	NFP
Seats won	30	14
Popular vote	154,656	56,951
Percentage	43.64%	16.07%
	Third party	Fourth party
Leader	Mahendra Chaudhry	Sakeasi Butadroka
Party	Labour	FNUF
Seats won	13	3
Popular vote	56,948	29,722
Percentage	16.07%	8.39%
Prime Minister before election
Kamisese Mara
Elected Prime Minister
Sitiveni Rabuka
SVT

General elections were held in Fiji between 23 and 30 May 1992. It was the first election held since two military coups in 1987 had severed Fiji's 113-year-old constitutional links with the British Monarchy, and later Fijian Monarchy, and ushered in a republic.

The 1992 elections were the first to be held under the new electoral system, which was deliberately biased in favour of ethnic Fijians. National constituencies, elected by universal suffrage and comprising almost half of the House of Representatives under the 1970 constitution, were abolished, and for the first time, all members of the House of Representatives were elected from communal constituencies on closed electoral rolls, for registered members of a particular ethnic group. 37 seats were allocated to ethnic Fijians and only 27 to Indo-Fijians, despite the near-equality of their numbers in the population; one seat was reserved for a representative of the Rotuman Islanders, with five constituencies reserved for General electors (an omnibus category for various minorities including Europeans, Chinese, and Banaban Islanders).

The Soqosoqo ni Vakavulewa ni Taukei led by Sitiveni Rabuka, who had instigated the 1987 coups, won 30 of the 38 seats reserved for ethnic Fijians and Rotuman; the remaining eight were won by the extremist Fijian Nationalist Party of Sakeasi Butadroka (three seats), the Soqosoqo ni Taukei ni Vanua (two seats) and independents (three). The 27 Indo-Fijian electorates were almost equally divided between the National Federation Party (which won 14 seats) and the Fiji Labour Party (13). All five of the "general electorates" were won by the General Voters Party.

== Results ==
Party	Votes	%	Seats	+/–
Soqosoqo ni Vakavulewa ni Taukei	154,656	43.64	30	New
National Federation Party	56,951	16.07	14	–
Fiji Labour Party	56,948	16.07	13	–
Fijian Nationalist United Front	29,722	8.39	3	+3
All Nationals Congress	28,189	7.95	0	New
Soqosoqo ni Taukei ni Vanua	9,321	2.63	2	+2
General Voters Party	5,079	1.43	5	New
Fijian Indian Liberal Party	1,783	0.50	0	New
Independents	11,708	3.30	3	+3
Total	354,357	100.00	70	+18
Valid votes	236,599	98.74		
Invalid/blank votes	3,013	1.26		
Total votes	239,612	100.00		
Registered voters/turnout	316,765	75.64		
Source: Nohlen et al.

== See also ==
- List of members of the Parliament of Fiji (1992–1994)
