= K. R. Latchan =

The Honourable K. R. Latchan MP
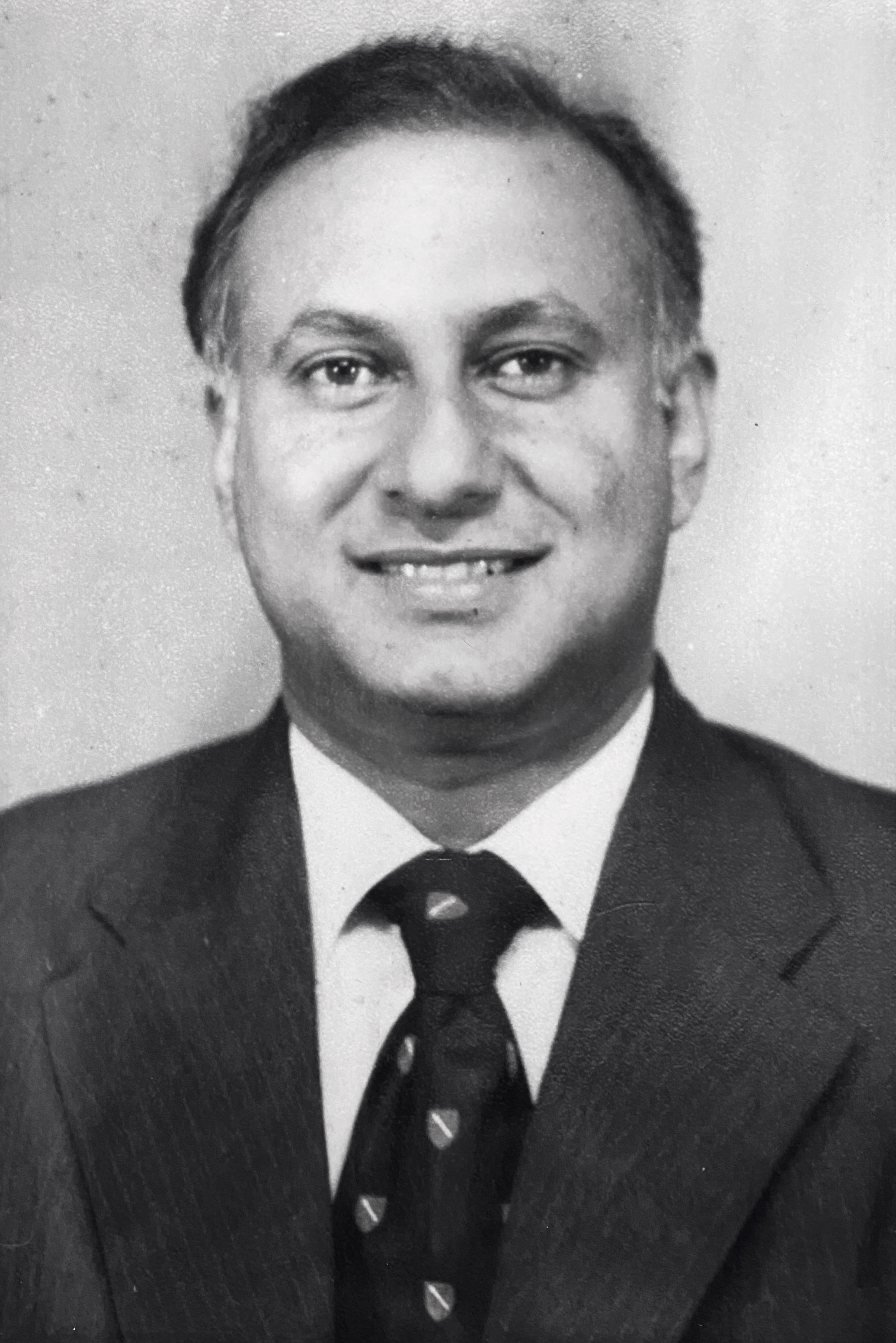

Member of House of Representatives of Fiji East Central Indian National Constituency
- In office 1977–1987
- Preceded by: Vijay R. Singh
- Succeeded by: abolished

Personal details
- Born: 15 June 1940 Korovou, Fiji
- Died: 15 June 1988 (aged 48) Nausori, Fiji
- Party: Alliance Party
- Spouse: Bijma W Latchan
- Nickname: K. R. Latchan

Ram Latchan, better known as K.R. Latchan (15 June 1940 - 15 June 1988) was a businessman, farmer and politician based in Nausori, Fiji. He was a member of the Alliance Party and House of Representatives from 1977-1987.

== Biography ==
K. R. Latchan grew up as a dairy farmer at his family farm in Tailevu Province of Fiji. His father, Khurbhur, immigrated from India in 1915 and worked as a Sirdar in the Public Works Department before settling as a farmer in the Tailevu Province. Khurbur died when Latchan was 9 years of age, he later adopted his father's name into his initial. His mother, Ram Kuar, raised her children as a single parent at the family farm.

He came into prominence as a businessman through K.R. Latchan Buses Limited, a major bus and coach service provider operating in Suva, Nausori and other eastern districts in Fiji. He started the business with the help of his mother, who had purchased the first bus, which he then expanded into a modern fleet. Latchan met Bijma Wati while operating his bus service, they married in 1966 and had 6 children. Latchan began establishing Dominion Oil Refinery Fiji Ltd in 1986, Fiji's first oil recycling and blending plant. Following his death, the company was renamed Pacoil Fiji Ltd in 1990, and company operations discontinued in 1999 due to policy changes by the Fiji Government.

Latchan became a member of the Alliance Party and wrested the seat of East Central National Constituency from Vijay R. Singh in the selection for the Alliance candidate for the 1977 Fijian General Election. He was re-elected in the 1982 and 1987 Fijian General Elections. Latchan's major political achievements includes the successful proposition for death duty to be abolished by the government. He was a member of the House of Representatives until the 1987 Fijian coups d'état.

He had a heart attack and died in Nausori, Fiji, on 15 June 1988.
