= Irene Jai Narayan =

Fijian politician

Member of Legislative Council (Fiji) Suva Indian Communal Constituency
- In office 1966–1972

Member of House of Representatives (Fiji) Suva City Indian Communal Constituency
- In office 1972–1987

Minister of Indian Affairs
- In office 1987–1992

Senator
- In office 1994–1999

Personal details
- Born: 23 February 1932 Lucknow, British India
- Died: 29 July 2011 (aged 79) Suva, Fiji
- Party: National Federation Party, Alliance Party, National Alliance Party
- Spouse: Jai Narayan
- Profession: Teacher

Irene Jai Narayan (23 February 1932 – 29 July 2011) was an Indian-born teacher and politician, who had a significant influence on politics in Fiji. She came to Fiji in 1959 after marrying Jai Narayan, a well known school Principal in Suva, and began her career as a teacher. She taught in DAV Girls School and MGM High School in Suva before entering politics.

== Member of Legislative Council ==
In 1966, she was handpicked by the then leader of the Federation Party, A. D. Patel to contest the Suva Indian Communal seat in the Legislative Council against Andrew Deoki. Deoki was an experienced political campaigner, having represented Suva in the Legislative Council since 1959 and had wide social contacts. He was the only non-Federation Indian member elected in the 1963 elections. A.D. Patel was of the opinion that a female candidate would be able to counteract some of Deoki's influence in the constituency. In the end Irene Narayan won easily by 5,676 votes to 2,779 votes. She increased her majority in the 1968 by-election. For a long time, she remained the sole Indian female member of the Legislative Council.

== Member of House of Representatives ==
Irene Narayan was elected to the Dominion of Fiji's House of Representatives in the 1972, 1977 (March), 1977 (September) and 1982 elections, from the Suva Indian Communal Constituency. In 1977 when the National Federation Party split into two factions, she joined the "Flower" faction, with Jai Ram Reddy, opposed to Sidiq Koya's "Dove" faction. In the September, 1977 election, the "Flower" faction won most of the seats reserved for Indians, Jai Ram Reddy became the Leader of the Opposition and Irene Narayan played an influential role within the "Flower" faction. In January 1977, The Fiji Times honoured her as its Woman of the Year.

== Resignation from NFP ==
She served as president of the party from 1976 to 1979. She was also the Opposition Whip from 1977 to 1979, and Deputy Leader of the Opposition from 1979 to 1985. In 1985, following the resignation of Jai Ram Reddy, she narrowly lost a bid to lead the opposition, to Sidiq Koya. Relations between her and the new leader remained strained and she resigned from the National Federation Party (NFP) after electoral setback in a by-election, accusing Koya of favouring his own supporters over party unity and stating that "the NFP has no future and is no longer virile as an opposition party."

== Member of Alliance Party ==
Between 1985 and 1987, the NFP again went through internal turmoil and many of its Parliamentarians resigned from the Party, but while most joined the fledgling Fiji Labour Party, Irene Narayan surprised everyone by joining the Alliance Party, which she had bitterly opposed throughout her political career. The Alliance Party was aware that she would not be able to hold the Suva City Indian Communal seat on its ticket and so rewarded her with the marginal seat of Suva Indian National Constituency. The Alliance had never lost this seat but in the general election of 1987, the loss of this seat led to the narrow defeat of the Alliance Party.

== Post coup politics ==
Following two military coups in 1987, she was one of the few Indo-Fijians who agreed to serve (as Minister of Indian Affairs) in the transitional government of 1987–92, a government that was widely condemned by many of her fellow Indo-Fijians for promulgating a constitution which many saw as racist as it ensured ethnic Fijian political supremacy. She served as a Senator from 1994 to 99, and in 1985 co-founded the Fiji Indian Congress. Although a Hindu, she played a leading role in the founding of the Christian Democratic Alliance in 1999.

Early in 2005, Narayen joined the National Alliance Party, a new party founded by Ratu Epeli Ganilau as an attempt to revive the defunct Alliance Party. She participated in the official launch of the party on 8 April 2005.

== See also ==
- National Federation Party
