= Sakeasi Butadroka =

Sakiasi Iliesa Bakewa Butadroka (died 2 December 1999) was a Fijian politician noted for his strident ethnic nationalism. Originally elected to the House of Representatives as a member of the ruling Alliance Party in the parliamentary election of 1972, he was expelled from the Alliance for his public attacks against the presence of Persons of Indian origin (Indo-Fijians) in Fiji. He had introduced a parliamentary motion calling for a resolution stating: "That this House agrees that the time has arrived when Indians or people of Indian origin in this country be repatriated back to India and that their travelling expenses back home and compensation for their properties in this country be met by the British Government." The motion was unanimously rejected.

Butadroka founded the Fijian Nationalist Party, which took 24.4 percent of the vote in the general election held in March 1977. Although the party won only one parliamentary seat, its votes were mostly at the expense of the Alliance. This allowed the opposition National Federation Party to win a plurality, precipitating a constitutional crisis. Three days after the election he gave a speech at a public meeting threatening bloodshed and demanding that the constitution be changed so that all Cabinet Ministers were ethnic Fijians. He was subsequently charged with unlawful assembly and inciting racial antagonism under Fiji's colonial-era Public Order Ordinance, convicted, and jailed for six months. He then lost his seat in the September 1977 Fijian general election.

Butadroka later became one of the leaders of the Taukei Movement in 1987, whose agitation formed the backdrop to the 1987 Fijian coups d'état that deposed the elected government and severed Fiji's ties to the British Monarchy that year. He was appointed to Sitiveni Rabuka's interim Cabinet following the 1987 coup as Minister of Land and Mineral Resources. As Minister, he proposed that all government-owned land would be placed under the jurisdiction of the Native Land Trust Board for the benefit of iTaukei, who would also have a right of first refusal over all sales of freehold land. The proposal was rejected by Rabuka. He strongly opposed the adoption of the present constitution, which reversed most of the provisions institutionalizing ethnic Fijian supremacy in the earlier 1990 constitution. When Parliament passed the new constitution, Butadroka publicly burnt it.

In 1999, he merged his party, now called the Nationalist United Front Party (FNUPF), with Iliesa Duvuloco's Vanua Tako Lavo Party to form the Nationalist Vanua Tako Lavo Party. The party won one seat, though Butadroka himself was not elected. The election brought the Fiji Labour Party-led People's Coalition to power, with an Indo-Fijian Prime Minister, Mahendra Chaudhry. Butadroka became involved with a campaign to destabilize the Chaudhry government, and his party was implicated by Maciu Navakasuasua, who was convicted of coup-related offences, in the planning of the coup d'état which deposed it in May 2000.
