= National constituencies =

Former feature of the Fijian electoral system

National constituencies were a former feature of the Fijian electoral system. They were created as a compromise between demands for universal suffrage on a common voters' roll, and for a strictly communal franchise, with Parliamentary constituencies allocated on an ethnic basis and elected only by voters enrolled as members of specific ethnic groups.

Demands for a common voters' roll were first raised by the Indo-Fijian-dominated National Federation Party in the early 1960s, but were resisted by leaders of the indigenous Fijian community, who feared that a common roll would favour Indo-Fijians, who were then in the majority. Concerns were also raised that as the fundamental faultline of Fijian politics was ethnic rather than ideological, direct competition between the races could lead to an escalation of ethnic tensions. As a compromise, the British colonial rulers established both communal constituencies (allocated and elected ethnically) and "cross-voting" constituencies in 1966. 25 members of the Legislative Council were elected from communal constituencies and 9 from cross-voting constituencies; the remaining 2 were nominated by the Great Council of Chiefs.

The cross-voting constituencies, which were later renamed national constituencies, were allocated ethnically but elected by universal suffrage. In the 1966 election, the first in which all adults had voted and the last before independence was granted in 1970, indigenous Fijians, Indo-Fijians, and minority groups (Europeans, Chinese, and others) were each allocated 3 cross-voting constituencies. Each elector thus had four votes: one for a communal constituency, and one for a national constituency for each of the three population groups. This required politicians to seek support from outside of their own ethnic group, without directly competing with candidates from other races.

Continued demands from the National Federation Party for a common franchise threatened to stall negotiations leading to independence. At a London conference in April 1970, however, the Chief Minister, Ratu Sir Kamisese Mara of the mainly indigenous Alliance Party and Opposition Leader Sidiq Koya of the NFP agreed to a compromise: a 52-member House of Representatives would be established, with 27 communal and 25 national constituencies. Of the national constituencies, indigenous Fijians and Indo-Fijians would each be allocated 10, and minority groups 5. Each voter had four votes: one for 'his' communal constituency and three for the national constituencies. Two maps overlapped each other: one in which Fiji was divided in ten constituencies electing one indigenous Fijian and one indo-Fijian each and one in which Fiji was divided in five constituencies for the election of 'general electors'. This arrangement remained in effect through five general elections, held between 1972 and 1987. As Fiji Islanders tended to vote along ethnic lines, the communal constituencies followed predictable patterns, with the national constituencies providing the real arena for competition.

National constituencies were abolished in the wake of the Fiji coups of 1987. Fijian ethno-nationalists, who seized power, insisted on their abolition on the grounds that they allowed non-indigenous Fijians a say in who represented indigenous voters; in the revised constitution, all parliamentary seats were allocated and elected communally. When the constitution was revised again in 1997, the constitutional convention decided not to reinstate the national constituencies, but to substitute open constituencies whose electors and candidates could be of any ethnic group.
