= Vivekanand Sharma =

The Honourable Dr. Vivekanand Sharma
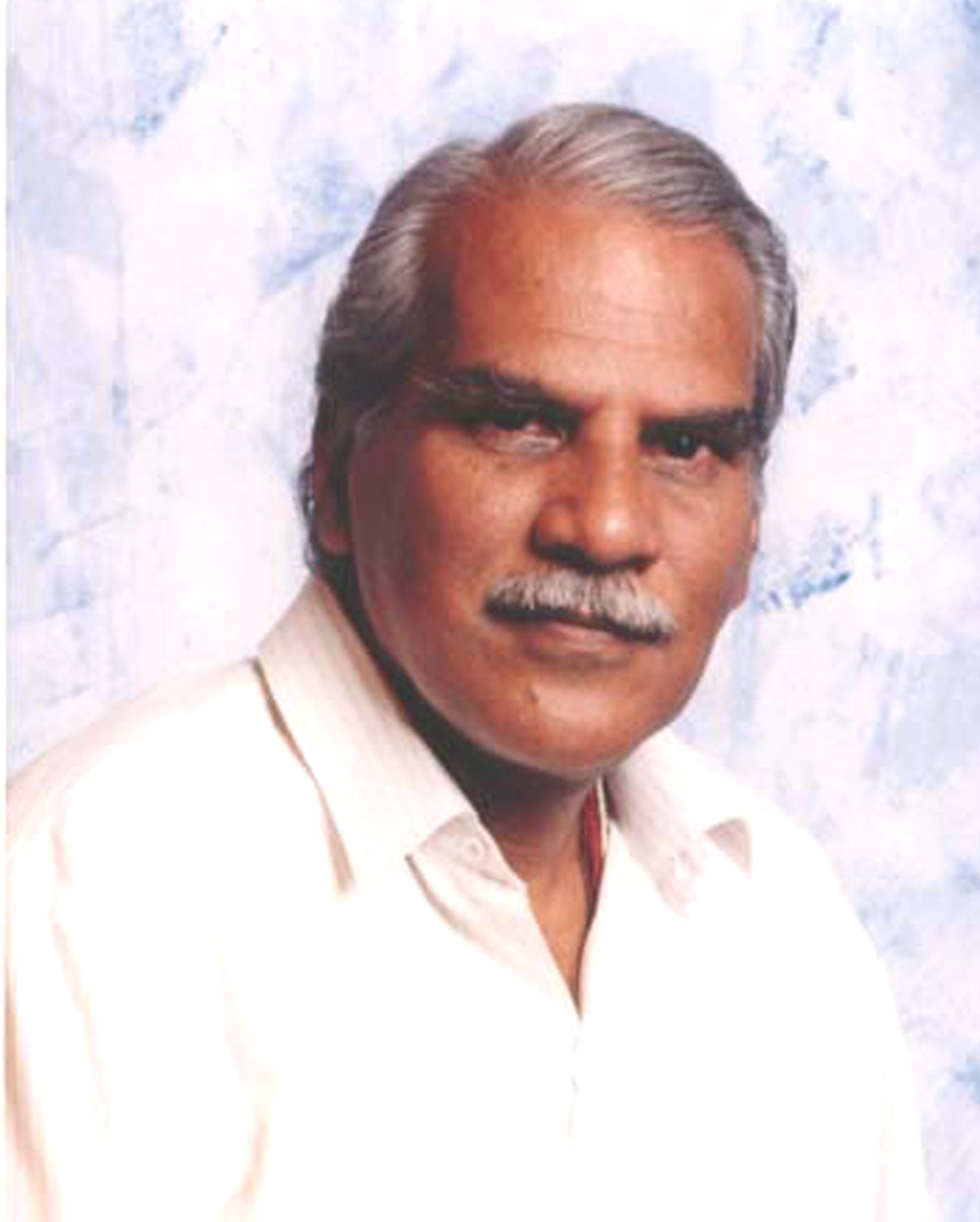

Senator
- Nominated by: Prime Minister of Fiji (Mara)
- Monarch: Elizabeth II
- Governors-General: Sir Robert Foster; Sir George Cakobau

Minister of State for Youth and Sport
- In office 1977–1981
- Prime Minister: Sir Kamisese Mara
- Preceded by: Jone Naisara
- Succeeded by: Tupeni Baba (Late On)

Member of the House of Representatives of Fiji
- In office 1977–1981
- Prime Minister: Sir Kamisese Mara
- Preceded by: Anirudh Kuver
- Succeeded by: Harish Sharma

Personal details
- Born: 1939 Nadi,Fiji
- Died: September 10, 2006(Age. 67) Brisbane,Australia
- Party: Alliance
- Education: Hindu College, Delhi (B.A.,M.A.); Sardar Patel University (Phd)

Dr. Vivekanad Sharma (1939 – 10 September 2006) was a Fiji Indian politician and religious worker but is best known for his promotion of the Hindi language in Fiji and abroad.

== Early life ==
Dr. Vivekanand Sharma was born 'in' [Nadi], Fiji into a cane farming family. He had his primary education at Votualevu Government School and secondary education at Shri Vivekananda High School after which he undertook teacher training. Upon completing his three years bond to serve the government, he went to India for further studies on 1 January 1964 and did his Bachelors and then master's degrees from Hindu College, Delhi University and later PhD in Hindi Literature from Sardar Patel University.(As per my personal records of the Family History)

== Contribution to Hindi literature ==
Dr. Sharma published a large number of books on Hindi and Hindu customs and culture. He was the founder and the President of Hindi Maha Parishad of Fiji (an organisation to promote Hindi), as well as founder, Principal and the Manager of Maharishi Sanatan College. He was the Chairman of the Hindi Work Group of Curriculum Development Unit, Ministry of Education, Fiji. He was also the Hindi Programme Coordinator at the University of the South Pacific. Upon his return to Fiji he produced several plays and used radio to promote Hindi and Hinduism. He opened a book shop in Nadi, Fiji, namely Prashant Pustak Bhandaar in 1975 for the preservation and promotion of Hindi and Indian cultures, customs and traditions in Fiji at national level. Dr. Suresh Rituparna, one of his best friends from Hindu College Delhi helped in the publication of all the books of Dr. Sharma.

== Political involvement ==
Dr. Sharma was an associate of A. D. Patel who kindled his interest in politics. He was the founder and President of International Youth Federation of the University of Delhi. He surprised everyone by standing as an Alliance candidate in the 1972 general election. He lost the election but was appointed a Senator by Ratu Sir Kamisese Mara; later he won the general election and became the Minister of State for Youth and Sports. He held Ratu Mara in high regard and wrote a book on him in Hindi. In the 1977 election, he won the South Western Indian National seat for the Alliance Party and remained in Parliament until 1981. During the time of the Qarase Government he was a national member for his Indian Council of Fiji.

== Religious activities ==
He was the founder of Votualevu Tirth Dhaam (Hindu Pilgrimage Centre). He served as the General Secretary and later as the National President of Shri Sanatan Dharm Pratinidhi Sabha of Fiji and as an advisor of Shri Sanatan Dharam Brahman Purohit Sabha of Fiji.

He died in Brisbane, Australia on 10 September 2006. He was cremated at Vatuwaqa Cemetery in Suva on Wednesday, 13 September 2006.

=== Awards ===
During World Hindi Convention in Mauritius he was appointed Vice President of World Bhojpuri Secretariat and a Senior Member of World Hindi Secretariat. He was also awarded Hindi Bhushan by the Uttar Pradesh Government of India - the first recipient of Indian origin born outside India. World Bhojpuri Convention honoured him with "Vishwa Bojpuri Sammaan" and the Vishva Hindi Sanskriti Sansthan honoured him with Vishva Hindi Sammaan. Locally, he was also decorated with the rare award of Sanatan Ratan by Shree Sanatan Dharam Pratinidhi Sabha of Fiji in 2004

=== Conclusion ===
"There may not be another Vivekanand Sharma for many years to come. He was indeed an institution and we shall ever be rini (indebteded) to him. Some of his quotable quotes are: 'How can they who leave their mothers unrobed, clothe others’ mothers in saris' 'Do your duty righteously and leave the rest on Bajrangi Baba' 'Never turn away any one disappointed from your compound' 'Language means culture, culture means identity' 'Make Hindi the vehicle of communication to protect our civilization which gives us our identity' 'Life is short, let it be great"

by Satya Nand Sharma (B.A. - Delhi Uni)
