= Harish Sharma =

The Honourable Harish Sharma

House of Representatives (Fiji) Nadi Indian Communal Constituency
- In office 1972–1987

Leader of the Opposition
- In office 1986–1987
- Preceded by: Sidiq Koya
- Succeeded by: Ratu Sir Kamisese Mara

Deputy Speaker of House of Representative
- In office 1977–1982

Deputy Prime Minister and Minister for Housing, Urban Development and Information
- In office April 1987 – May 1987
- Prime Minister: Timoci Bavadra

House of Representatives (Fiji) Malomalo North/Nadi Rural Indian Communal Constituency
- In office 1994–1999

Personal details
- Born: 3 May 1932 (age 93) Nausori, Fiji
- Party: National Federation Party
- Spouse: Ambika Devi Sharma
- Profession: Lawyer

Harish Chandra Sharma (born 3 May 1932) is a Fiji Indian politician who became the leader of the National Federation Party in 1987. He was also the leader of the organisation representing most of the Hindus in Fiji, the Shree Sanatan Dharam Pratinidhi Sabha of Fiji.

== Early life ==
Sharma was born in Nausori, Fiji in 1932. He grew up in "abject poverty". He worked as a civil servant and as an insurance agent before departing for Tasmania in 1960, where he received the LL.B. from the University of Tasmania in 1964. On his return to Fiji he first worked for Sidiq Koya then for A. D. Patel, before setting up his own law firm in 1969. He was nominated to the Senate by the Leader of the Opposition in 1970 and remained a Senator until the 1972 general election.

== Political career ==
He was first elected to the House of Representatives in 1972 as a candidate for the National Federation Party. He has contested a total of seven elections, without losing any. In 1987 he was chosen as the leader of the National Federation Party. He was instrumental in forming a coalition with the Fiji Labour Party with the coalition winning the 1987 elections. He was appointed the Deputy Prime Minister and Minister for Housing, Urban Affairs and Information in the month-long Government of Timoci Bavadra, which was deposed by Sitiveni Rabuka.

He re-entered Parliament in the 1994 general election, representing the Malomalo North/Nadi Rural Indian Constituency and served as Deputy Leader of Opposition under Jai Ram Reddy until 1999. In 2007 he was made a life member of the Fiji Law Society. At present he resides in Sydney, Australia.
