= 1994 Fijian general election =

- 18–25 February 1994

All 70 seats in the House of Representatives 35 seats needed for a majority
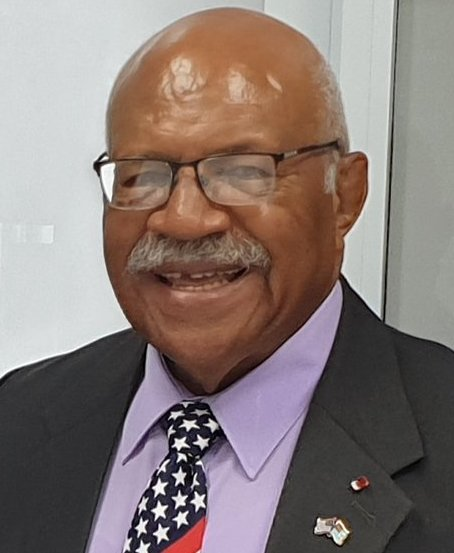

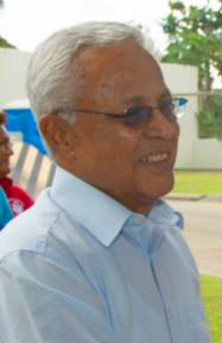

	First party	Second party	Third party
		NFP
Leader	Sitiveni Rabuka	Jai Ram Reddy	Mahendra Chaudhry
Party	SVT	NFP	Labour
Last election	30 seats	12 seats	13 seats
Seats won	31	20	7
Seat change	▲1	▲8	▼6
Popular vote	145,041	63,097	51,951
Percentage	40.91%	17.79%	14.65%
Swing	▼2.73pp	▲1.72pp	▼1.42pp
	Fourth party	Fifth party	Sixth party
Leader	Josefata Kamikamica		None
Party	FAP	GVP	ANC
Last election	—	5 seats	0 seats
Seats won	5	4	1
Seat change	New	▼1	▲1
Popular vote	34,976	4,339	21,808
Percentage	9.86%	1.22%	6.15%
Swing	New	▼0.22pp	▼1.8pp
Prime Minister before election
Sitiveni Rabuka
SVT
Elected Prime Minister
Sitiveni Rabuka
SVT

General elections were held in Fiji between 18 and 25 February 1994. This election, the second since Fiji had become a republic following two military coups in 1987, was brought about by splits within the ruling Soqosoqo ni Vakavulewa ni Taukei (SVT) and by the withdrawal of the support of the Fiji Labour Party, which claimed that Prime Minister Sitiveni Rabuka had reneged on a deal to review Fiji's electoral system, which was heavily weighted in favour of ethnic Fijians, despite their being nearly equal in number to Indo-Fijians.

The elections produced little change among the 38 seats in the House of Representatives that were reserved for ethnic Fijians and Rotuman Islanders. The SVT won 33 seats, and the Fijian Association Party of former Finance Minister Josefata Kamikamica won five. The Fijian Nationalist Party of Sakeasi Butadroka, which advocated the forced repatriation of all Fijians of Indian descent, lost the three seats that it had won in the previous election. The five "general electorates," reserved for Fiji's European, Chinese, and other minorities, showed similarly little change, with the General Voters Party winning four seats and the All Nationals Congress, one. There was a very significant change in the composition of the 27 Indo-Fijian seats, however. The Fiji Labour Party lost 6 of its 13 seats, with the National Federation Party winning the remaining 20. The NFP leader, Jai Ram Reddy, enjoyed a personal rapport with Rabuka; although they did not enter into a formal coalition, their negotiations led to a substantial overhaul of the Fijian Constitution which led to the historic election of 1999, which brought Fiji's first Indo-Fijian Prime Minister, Mahendra Chaudhry, to power.

Following the 1994 election, Rabuka formed a coalition with the General Voters Party and remained Prime Minister.

== Results ==
Party	Votes	%	Seats	+/–
Soqosoqo ni Vakavulewa ni Taukei	145,091	40.91	31	+1
National Federation Party	63,097	17.79	20	+6
Fiji Labour Party	51,951	14.65	7	−6
Fijian Association Party	34,976	9.86	5	New
All Nationals Congress	21,808	6.15	1	+1
Fijian Nationalist Party	14,446	4.07	0	−3
Soqosoqo ni Taukei ni Vanua	6,417	1.81	0	−2
General Voters Party	4,339	1.22	4	−1
Independents	12,549	3.54	2	−1
Total	354,674	100.00	70	0
Valid votes	237,307	99.06		
Invalid/blank votes	2,260	0.94		
Total votes	239,567	100.00		
Registered voters/turnout	330,092	72.58		
Source: Nohlen et al., IPU

== See also ==
- List of members of the Parliament of Fiji (1994–1999)
