= Jai Ram Reddy =

Indo-Fijian politician (1937–2022)

The Honourable Jai Ram Reddy CF

2nd Leader of the Opposition (Fiji)
- In office 1977–1983
- Governors General: Ratu Sir George Cakobau; Ratu Sir Penaia Ganilau
- Prime Minister: Ratu Sir Kamisese Mara
- Preceded by: Sidiq Koya
- Succeeded by: Sidiq Koya
- In office 1992–1999
- President: Ratu Sir Penaia Ganilau; Ratu Sir Kamisese Mara
- Prime Minister: Sitiveni Rabuka
- Succeeded by: Ratu Inoke Kubuabola

26th Attorney General of Fiji
- In office 14 April 1987 – 19 May 1987
- Monarch: Elizabeth II
- Governor General: Ratu Sir Penaia Ganilau
- Prime Minister: Timoci Bavadra
- Preceded by: Qoriniasi Bale
- Succeeded by: Alipate Qetaki

Judge of the International Criminal Tribunal for Rwanda
- In office 21 May 2003 – 31 December 2008

1st President of the Court of Appeal of Fiji
- In office 2000–2000
- President: Ratu Sir Kamisese Mara
- Succeeded by: Sir Timoci Tuivaga
- In office 2002–2003
- President: Ratu Josefa Iloilo
- Preceded by: Sir Timoci Tuivaga
- Succeeded by: Sir Gordon Ward

Senator
- In office 1972–1977
- Appointed by: Leader of the Opposition
- President of the Senate: Robert Munro
- Preceded by: Sidiq Koya

Member of Parliament for Lautoka Indian
- In office 1977–1987
- Preceded by: Sidiq Koya

Member of Parliament
- In office 1992–1999

Personal details
- Born: 12 May 1937 Lautoka, Colony of Fiji
- Died: 29 August 2022 (aged 85) Auckland, New Zealand
- Party: National Federation Party
- Spouse(s): 1. Anne Reddy; 1962-1970 (divorced); Chandra Wati Singh m. 1972
- Children: 2 sons, 2 daughters
- Education: Victoria University
- Profession: Lawyer, Judge

Jai Ram Reddy, CF (12 May 1937 – 29 August 2022) was an Indo-Fijian politician, who had a distinguished career in both the legislative and judicial branches of the Fijian government. In 1998, he received Fiji's highest honour, the Companion of the Order of Fiji, in recognition of his services to his country.

As leader of the National Federation Party (NFP), he was Leader of the Official Opposition from 1977 to 1983, and again from 1992 to 1999. He went on to serve as President of the Fiji Court of Appeal. He held this post briefly in 2000, and again from 2002 to 2003. On 31 January 2003, the United Nations General Assembly elected him as a member of the International Criminal Tribunal for Rwanda, which is responsible for the prosecution of war crimes. He died on 29 August 2022.

== Early life and career ==
Jai Ram Reddy was born into a Telugu family, to parents Pethi and Yenkattama Reddy at Latuoka Hospital on 12 May 1937, the eldest of five children. Both his paternal grandfather, Byanna Reddy, a (Kshatriya) from the Cuddapah District in what is now Andhra Pradesh. His maternal grandfather, Iyyappa Reddy, was a social worker and a founder of the Lovu Sangam Primary School, emigrated to Fiji in 1903 on the Elbe III.

Educated initially at Sri Vivekananda High School in Nadi and then at DAV College in Suva, Reddy enrolled in the University Entrance class at Wellington Technical College, New Zealand, in April 1955, and was the only non-accredited student in the college to pass the examination that year. He went on to enroll in the Law faculty of Wellington's Victoria University in 1956, graduating in 1960, when he was admitted to the New Zealand bar. He was subsequently admitted to the bar in Fiji the following year. From 1961 to 1966 he was Staff Solicitor and Associate at the law firm of A. D. Patel & Co in Nadi, Fiji. From 1966 to 1968, he served as Crown Counsel and was Principal Legal Officer in the Attorney-General's Office from 1968 to 1970. He was the senior partner in a law firm of Stuart Reddy & Co of Lautoka, Fiji. From 1988 to 1997, he was sole practitioner in Lautoka.

== Political career ==
Reddy entered politics when he was appointed to the Senate, in 1972, by the then leader of the opposition, Sidiq Koya. In 1976 he was instrumental in bringing the two factions of the party together.

Reddy replaced Sidiq Koya as leader of the NFP in September 1977, following major internal strife which had resulted in the party's missing out on forming the government despite its narrow victory in the election of March 1977, and its subsequent crushing defeat in a second election held to resolve the political stalemate in September. Under his leadership, the NFP made substantial gains in the election of 1982, but fell short of ousting the longtime Prime Minister Ratu Sir Kamisese Mara, and was subsequently deposed as party leader in favour of Koya in 1983. Reddy briefly served as Attorney-General and Minister for Justice in the Bavadra government, in April and May 1987. Following the military coups of 1987, however, he again took over the leadership of the NFP, and continued to lead the party throughout the 1990s. In the elections of 1992 and 1994, the NFP won a majority of the 27 seats in the House of Representatives then reserved for Indo-Fijians.

In the late 1990s, Reddy decided to negotiate with the Prime Minister, General Sitiveni Rabuka, on amending the 1990 constitution, which was widely perceived as racist and was compared by many to South Africa's apartheid regime, as it guaranteed the political supremacy of ethnic Fijians. As a result of these negotiations, assisted by Sir Paul Reeves, a former Governor General of New Zealand, a new constitution emerged, which removed all discriminatory provisions against Indo-Fijians (except the mainly honorary office of President, which remained reserved for a Fijian hereditary Chief). This was considered Reddy's crowning achievement. His glory was short-lived, however. In the ensuing election of 1999, he entered into an electoral pact with his former enemy, Rabuka, an alliance which proved to be his undoing. Many Indo-Fijians had not forgiven Rabuka for carrying out the coups of 1987 and for his role in the subsequent adoption of the 1990 constitution, and the NFP lost all of its seats. Reddy's parliamentary career of some twenty years had come to an end.

== Reddy as judge ==
In 2000, Reddy was appointed President of the Fijian Court of Appeal. He resigned in the wake of the overthrow of the constitutional government of Fiji in 2000, but was reappointed to the post in January 2002. He resigned the Presidency of the Court of Appeal on 18 April 2003 to take up his position with the Rwanda tribunal, but remained a member of the court. Fiji Television reported on 14 June 2006 that Reddy's term on the Rwanda tribunal, along with that of ten other members, which had been due to expire in May 2007, had been extended to December 2008.

== Personal life ==
Reddy married Anne, a geology professor's daughter in 1962. They had a son, Sanjay, and a daughter, Helen. After separating from Anne in 1970, Reddy remarried in 1972 to Chandra Wati Singh, a Hansard reporter in the Legislative Council of Fiji. They had a daughter, Sandhya, and a son, Prashant.

Government offices
| Preceded by Sidiq Koya | 1st time Leader of the Opposition; 1987 | Succeeded by Sidiq Koya |
| Preceded by Vacant | 2nd time Leader of the Opposition; 1992–1999 | Succeeded by Ratu Inoke Kubuabola |
Legal offices
| Preceded by Qoriniasi Bale | Attorney General of Fiji; 1987 | Succeeded by Alipate Qetaki |
| Preceded by None (new office) | 1st time President of the Court of Appeal; 2000 | Succeeded by Sir Timoci Tuivaga |
| Preceded by Vacant | 1st time President of the Court of Appeal; 2002–2003 | Succeeded by Gordon Ward |
Political offices
| Preceded by | Senator of Fiji; 1972–1977 | Succeeded by |
| Preceded by Sidiq Koya | 1st time Member, House of Representatives of Fiji for Lautoka Indian; 1977–1987 | Succeeded by Vacant |
| Preceded by Vacant | 2nd time Member, House of Representatives of Fiji; 1992–1999 | Succeeded by |
