= Sidiq Koya =

Fijian politician (1924–1993)

The Honourable Siddiq Moidin Koya

Member of Legislative Council
- In office 1963–1972

Member of House of Representatives
- In office 1972–1977
- Succeeded by: Jai Ram Reddy
- In office 1982–1987

Leader of the Opposition
- In office 1969–1977
- Preceded by: A.D. Patel
- Succeeded by: Harish Sharma

Personal details
- Born: 1924 Ba, Fiji
- Died: 1993 (aged 68–69) Lautoka, Fiji
- Party: National Federation Party
- Children: Faiyaz Koya
- Profession: Lawyer

Siddiq Muhy'Ddin Kwaja, officially known as Siddiq Moidin Khoya (29 February 1924 – 25 April 1993) was a Fijian politician, Statesman and Opposition leader. He succeeded to the leadership of the mostly Indo-Fijian National Federation Party (NFP) on the death of the party's founder, A. D. Patel, in October 1969, remaining in this post until 1977. He later served a second term as leader of the NFP, from 1984 to 1987.

Koya is credited with his role in paving the way for Fijian independence from Britain in 1970. The National Federation Party had been opposing plans for independence without significant changes to the constitution. The NFP, in particular, wanted a legislature to be elected by universal suffrage from a common electoral roll of all voters – a demand rejected by the main ethnic Fijian politicians, who wanted a communal franchise with parliamentary seats allocated among the different ethnic groups, elected from ethnic electoral rolls. Sidiq Koya was more willing to compromise than his predecessor, and he was instrumental in persuading his party and his people to accept independence with a communal franchise.

== Early life and family ==
Sidiq Khoja was born in Ba District to a prominent Indo-Fijian family of Malabar Muslim descent, whose parents emigrated from the Indian state of Kerala. He only went to year six in primary school and never attended high school. Being a son of a cane farmer he worked his way up and later worked for the law firm of S. B. Patel in Lautoka. He then travelled to Tasmania to obtain his law degree from the University of Tasmania. He and his wife Amina had three children, daughter Shahnaaz and sons Faiyaz and Faizal. Koya has six grandchildren, Aleisha, Benjamin, Elizabeth, Zane, Akif and Farhaan who now reside in Australia, Canada and Fiji.

== Community involvement ==
=== Kisan Sangh ===
In 1956, S.M. Koya went into partnership with N.S. Charmers, who was the legal advisor to the Kisan Sangh. This brought Koya closer to the Kisan Sangh hierarchy, and on 10 February 1957 he was elected the Vice-President of the organisation. In 1958 he was re-elected to the post. Although Koya had initially been accepted with open arms by the Kisan Sangh, which lacked any legally qualified person in its leadership team, differences soon arose between Koya and Ayodhya Prasad, who saw Koya as a threat to his leadership. Ayodhya Prasad managed to get Koya ousted from the Kisan Sangh but paid a heavy price for this as Koya worked against Ayodhya Prasad to have him defeated in the 1959 Legislative Council election.

=== Then India Maunatul Islam Association of Fiji ===
Koya also made contributions to religious and cultural organisations. He served as President and Speaker of the Then India Maunatul Islam Association of Fiji, an organisation representing Muslims of South Indian origin in Fiji. Koya's family originated from Kerala, in South India.

=== The Federation of Cane Growers ===
Koya was one of the founding members of the Federation of Cane Growers, formed in 1959 to negotiate the new cane contract with the Colonial Sugar Refining Company. He formed close ties with A.D. Patel and rose to prominence as the sugar cane dispute continued. He also involved himself with other industrial disputes in Fiji in 1959 by defending union leaders involved in strikes.

== Legislative Council Elections ==
The Federation Committee contested the 1963 under the banner of the Citizens Federation. Its three candidates, in the sugar cane growing areas, were A.D. Patel, James Madhavan, and Koya himself. All three Citizens Federation candidates were elected. Koya narrowly defeated James Shankar Singh of Ba by 3998 votes to 3480 votes, making him the first Muslim to be elected to the Legislative Council. Koya was responsible for drafting the constitution of the Federation Party which came into existence on 21 June 1964, making it the first political party in Fiji. He easily retained his seat at the 1966 general election and the 1968 by-election.

== Political career ==
=== Party Leader and towards Independence ===
Following the death of A.D. Patel in 1969, Koya was elected the leader of the National Federation Party. He adopted a conciliatory style of leadership and soon had an agreement with the leader of the Alliance Party, Ratu Sir Kamisese Mara, for independence for Fiji. There were those within his party who had opposed his leadership and with the unveiling of the new constitution the opposition from within gained strength. At this time in Fiji's history, Koya, the opposition leader, was seen as being too close to the prime minister.

=== Split in the National Federation Party ===
The first elections held after independence, in 1972, saw the NFP win 19 of the 52 seats in the House of Representatives. Opposition to Koya from within the party grew and by 1976 the party was divided into two groups when some members of his party expressed support for the Agricultural Landlord and Tenants Bill, which Koya and the NFP officially opposed. (Koya and his people did not oppose the changes but suggested the party abstain and thus defeat the bill, which required a 75% majority to help it to pass.) The differences were swept under the carpet for the parliamentary elections of March 1977. Koya led his National Federation Party (NFP) to a narrow victory, and would have become Prime Minister, but internal party strife resulted in the Governor General, Ratu Sir George Cakobau, calling on the defeated Prime Minister, Ratu Sir Kamisese Mara, to form a new government. As seen from Brij V Lal's book on the life of Jai Ram Reddy called Eye of the Storm, all 26 members of the National Federation Party sent a signed memo, that is signed by each of them to the then Governor General pledging their support for Koya. The governor General was concerned that Sakeasi Butadroka, the Fijian leader who destroyed Mara's majority by splitting 25% of the Fijian votes, would fulfil his promise made 7 April 1977 at the Old Suva Town Hall in his midday speech that if an Indian was elected Prime Minister Blood would flow. He pointed to his signature red tie. The Governor General who has asked the NFP to form government then changed his mind and appointed Ratu Sir Kamisese Mara as the prime minister. There was no internal strife as Koya and his Parliamentary Caucus spent Sunday, Monday, Tuesday and Wednesday pleading to Ratu Mara to form a coalition government and to remain Prime Minister. This "strife among us" was not evident in those four days. Koya had been opposed in the election by R. D. Patel, brother of the late leader of NFP and had won by a narrow margin. A second election to resolve the impasse was held in September that year, resulting in a heavy defeat for the NFP after it had split into two factions known as the Dove and Flower factions. Koya lost his parliamentary seat to Jai Ram Reddy, who became the new leader of the NFP. It is also often rumored that Koya had been backstabbed by his own party members who formed the flower faction on the basis that they did not want a Muslim as the prime minister. Koya's Dove faction had won only 3 seats compared to 12 won by the Flower faction.

=== Return to leadership of NFP ===
The NFP had re-united for the 1982 elections and Koya regained his seat in the general election held that year. After the resignation of Jai Ram Reddy, Koya returned to the leadership of the NFP in 1984. He was not far from controversy, and after being accused of favouring his own supporters, lost a crucial by-election in 1985. With the emergence of Fiji Labour Party (FLP), the NFP lost ground and he resigned from the leadership of the NFP before the 1987 election, when the NFP formed an electoral coalition with the Fiji Labour Party, under the leadership of Timoci Bavadra.

Preceded by A.D. Patel	Leader of the Opposition of Fiji; 1969–1977	Succeeded by Jai Ram Reddy
Preceded by Jai Ram Reddy	Leader of the Opposition of Fiji; 1984–1987	Succeeded by Harish Sharma
