= September 1977 Fijian general election =

- 17–24 September 1977

All 52 seats in the House of Representatives 26 seats needed for a majority
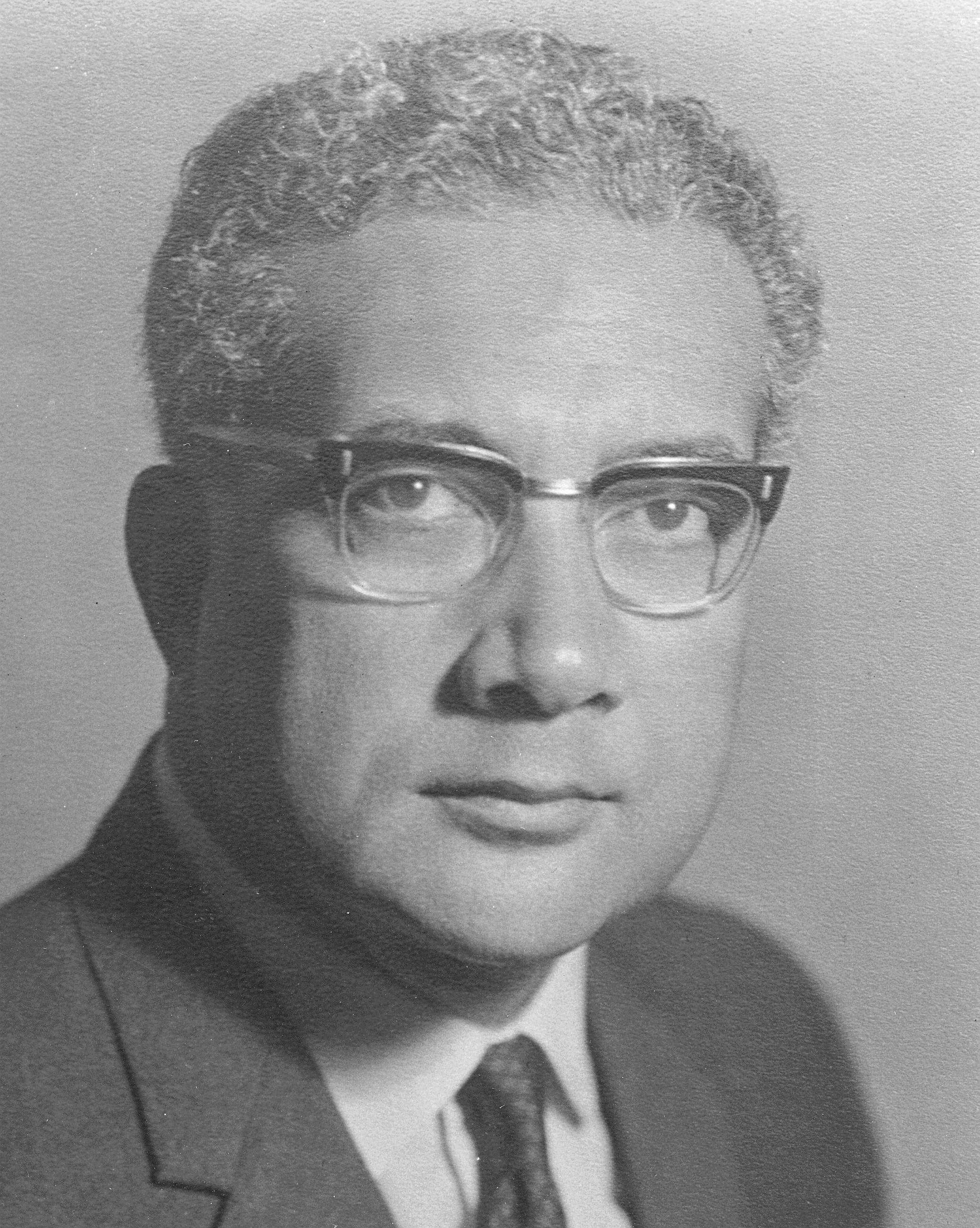
	First party	Second party	Third party
		NFP-F	NFP-D
Leader	Kamisese Mara	Jai Ram Reddy	Sidiq Koya
Party	Alliance	NFP–Flower	NFP–Dove
Seats won	36	12	3
Popular vote	378,349	171,508	149,305
Percentage	52.24%	23.68%	20.62%
Prime Minister before election
Kamisese Mara
Alliance
Elected Prime Minister
Kamisese Mara
Alliance

Early general elections were held in Fiji between 17 and 24 September 1977. They followed elections in March which resulted in a hung parliament and no party able to gain a majority. The new election resulted in a landslide win for the Alliance Party (Fiji) led by Prime Minister Kamisese Mara, which won 36 seats out of 52. It was aided by a split in the main opposition, the National Federation Party (NFP) and a decline in support for the Fijian Nationalist Party.

== Background ==
The March elections had seen the NFP win 26 seats, the Alliance 24, the Fijian Nationalist Party one and an independent one.

With divisions apparent in the NFP, Governor-General George Cakobau asked Alliance Party leader and incumbent Prime Minister Kamisese Mara to form a government, claiming that Mara was able to command a majority. However, in June the Alliance Party attempted to pass a motion of confidence in the government but lost as the sole Fijian Nationalist Party MP voted against. At the end of June Cakobau dissolved parliament, resulting in fresh elections being held.

Prior to the elections, the NFP openly split in two, with the faction of leader Sidiq Koya and a rival NFP group running against each other in 24 seats. Koya's faction was symbolised by a dove, with the rival faction using a hibiscus flower

In August Fijian Nationalist Party leader Sakeasi Butadroka was given a six month jail sentence for inciting racial hatred.

== Results ==
Koya lost his seat to a rival NFP candidate Jai Ram Reddy. Sole independent MP Osea Gavidi was narrowly re-elected, with five Alliance MPs being elected unopposed.

Party	Votes	%	Seats	+/–
Alliance Party	378,349	52.24	36	+12
National Federation Party–Flower	171,508	23.68	12	–11
National Federation Party–Dove	149,305	20.62	3	–
Fijian Nationalist Party	18,854	2.60	0	–1
Independents	6,228	0.86	1	0
Total	724,244	100.00	52	0
Valid votes	724,244	93.34		
Invalid/blank votes	51,713	6.66		
Total ballots cast	201,245	–		
Registered voters/turnout	287,081	70.10		
Source: Nohlen et al.

== Aftermath ==
Following the elections, Mara appointed a twelve-member cabinet. Jai Ram Reddy became Leader of the Opposition.

Position	Minister
Prime Minister; Minister of Foreign Affairs	Kamisese Mara
Deputy Prime Minister; Minister of Fijian Affairs and Rural Development	Penaia Ganilau
Attorney General	Vijay R. Singh
Minister of Agriculture and Fisheries	Charles Walker
Minister of Commerce, Industry and Co-operatives	Mohammed Ramzan
Minister of Education and Sport	Semesa Sikivou
Minister of Finance	Charles Stinson
Minister of Health	Ted Beddoes
Minister of Labour, Industrial Relations and Immigration	David Toganivalu
Minister of Tourism, Transport and Civil Aviation	Tomasi Vakatora
Minister of Urban Development and Housing	Jonati Mavoa
Minister of Works and Communications	James Shankar Singh
Minister of State for Co-operatives	Livai Nasilivata
Minister of State for Forests	Josaia Tavaiqia
Minister of State for Information	William Toganivalu
Minister of State for Lands and Mineral Resources	Militoni Leweniqila
Minister of State for Home Affairs	Solomone Momoivalu
Minister of State for Youth and Sport	Vivekanand Sharma

Bill Clark later became Minister of Lands and Minerals and Sakiasi Waqanivavalagi became Minister of Youth and Sport.

In a cabinet reshuffle in January 1981, Clark became Minister of Energy, David Toganivalu became Minister of Commerce and Industry, Mohammed Ramzan became Minister of Health, Tomasi Vakatora became Minister of Labour, Industry Relations and Immigration, Ted Beddoes became Minister of Tourism, transport and Civil Aviation and Waqanivavalagi added Lands and Mineral Resources to his Youth and Sport portfolio.

== See also ==
- List of members of the Parliament of Fiji (1977–1982)
