= March 1977 Fijian general election =

- 19 March–2 April 1977

All 52 seats in the House of Representatives 26 seats needed for a majority
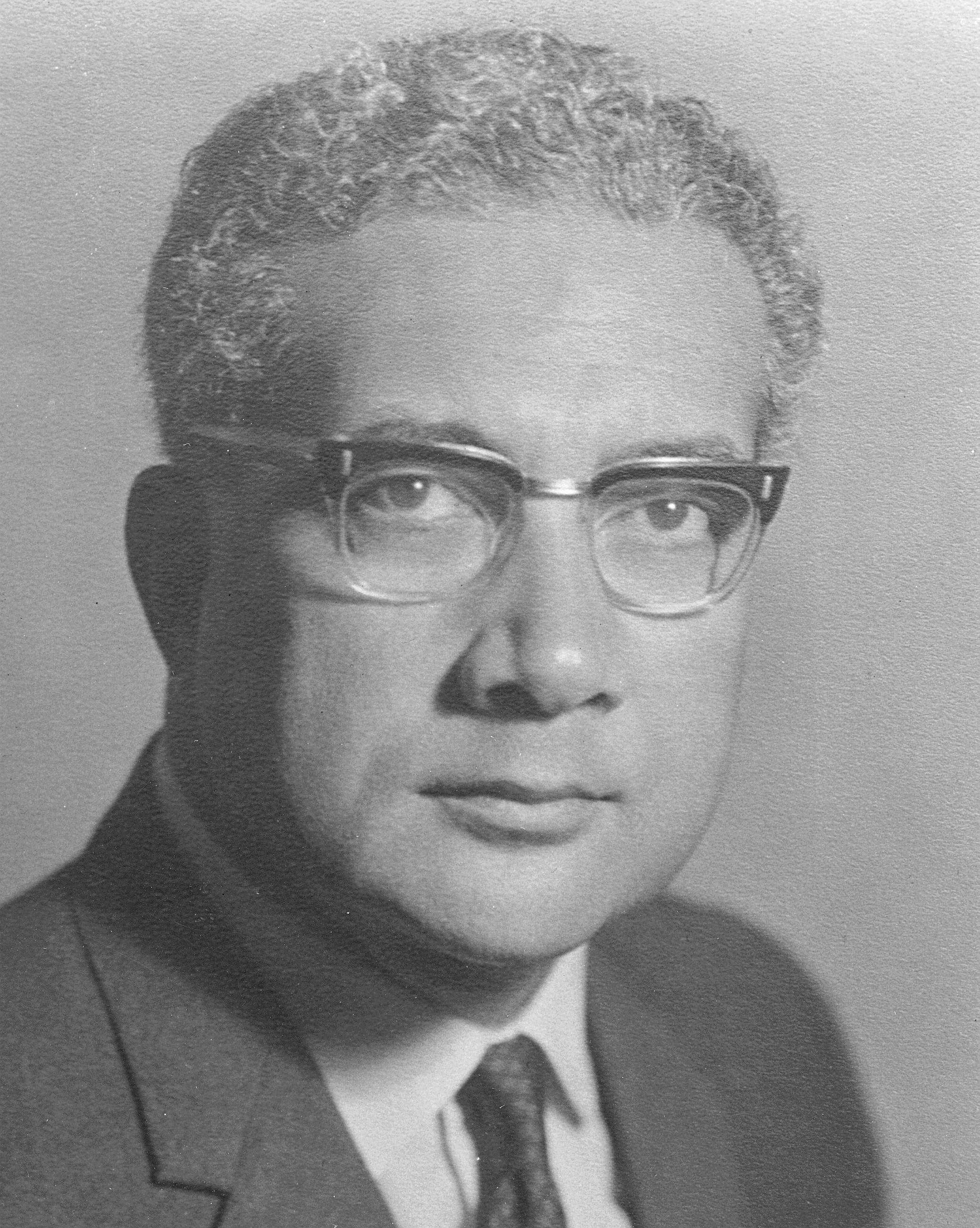

	First party	Second party	Third party
		NFP
Leader	Kamisese Mara	Sidiq Koya	Sakeasi Butadroka
Party	Alliance	NFP	Nationalist
Last election	33 seats	15 seats	–
Seats won	24	26	1
Seat change	▼9	▲7	New
Popular vote	338,523	332,764	39,238
Percentage	46.02%	45.23%	5.33%
Swing	▼6.22pp	▲9.42pp	New
Prime Minister before election
Kamisese Mara
Alliance
Elected Prime Minister
Kamisese Mara
Alliance

General elections were held in Fiji between 19 March and 2 April 1977. As a result of a split in the ethnic Fijian vote, the ruling Alliance Party of Prime Minister Kamisese Mara suffered a narrow defeat. Although the Alliance Party received the most votes, it won only 24 seats, two fewer than the Indo-Fijian-dominated National Federation Party (NFP). One seat was won by the Fijian Nationalist Party, with the remaining seat going to an independent candidate, Osea Gavidi.

Although the NFP emerged as the largest party, Governor-General George Cakobau asked Mara to form a new government, claiming that he had the support of the majority of the House. The new government remained in office until early elections in September the same year.

== Results ==
Around 25% of the Fijian vote went to the new Fijian Nationalist Party of Sakeasi Butadroka, an extremist organisation that ran on a "Fiji for the Fijians" platform and advocated the repatriation of Indo-Fijians to India.

Three ministers – Peniame Naqasima, Josua Toganivalu and Sakiasi Waqanivavalagi – lost their seats.

Party	Votes	%	Seats	+/–
Alliance Party	338,523	46.02	24	–9
National Federation Party	332,764	45.23	26	+7
Fijian Nationalist Party	39,238	5.33	1	New
Independents	25,142	3.42	1	+1
Total	735,667	100.00	52	0
Valid votes	735,667	93.91		
Invalid/blank votes	47,690	6.09		
Total ballots cast	190,291	–		
Registered voters/turnout	280,784	67.77		
Source: Nohlen et al.

== Aftermath ==
Following the elections Mara resigned as Prime Minister on 5 April and turned down offers from the NFP to participate in a coalition government. It was expected that the NFP would be unable to form a government without a majority, but independent MP Osea Gavidi announced that he would support the party, giving it a two-seat majority. However, Gavidi changed his mind the following day.

Four days after the election, Sidiq Koya arrived at Government House expecting to be offered the opportunity to form a government. However, he was told by Governor-General Cakobau that he had reappointed Mara. Cakobau then made a statement claiming that Mara had the support of the majority of MPs. Pacific Islands Monthly reported that following an NFP meeting to discuss the allocation of cabinet portfolios (in which Koya only narrowly won a vote to remain leader of the party), opponents of Koya had passed a message to the Governor-General stating that they would not support him as Prime Minister. Supporters of Koya subsequently blamed a faction led by NFP president Irene Jai Narayan for keeping the party out of office.

In June Mara moved a motion of confidence in his government. The NFP proposed an amendment that the Governor-General should ignore any request from Mara to dissolve parliament if the motion was defeated, and instead appoint Koya as Prime Minister. House Leader Jonati Mavoa claimed that the Governor-General had no legal right to ignore such a request. The NFP amendment passed after Butadroka voted in favour. However, Cakobau dissolved parliament at the end of June, with fresh elections later scheduled for September.

== See also ==
- List of members of the Parliament of Fiji (1977)
