= National Federation Party =

National Federation Party नेशनल फेडरेशन पार्टी (Fiji Hindi) Mataisoqosoqo ni National Federation (Fijian)
- Abbreviation: NFP
- Leader: Biman Prasad
- President: Parmod Chand
- General Secretary: Kamal Lyer
- Founder: A. D. Patel
- Founded: November 1968
- Preceded by: Federation Party, National Democratic Party
- Headquarters: 124 Princes Road, Tamavua, Samabula, Suva
- Youth wing: NFP Youth Wing
- Ideology: Social democracy Third Way
- Political position: Centre-left
- Colours: Red and green
- MPs in the Parliament of Fiji: 5 / 55

Election symbol

Website
- nfpfiji.org

The National Federation Party (Fiji Hindi: नेशनल फेडरेशन पार्टी; Fijian: Mataisoqosoqo ni National Federation) is a Fijian political party founded by A. D. Patel in November 1968, as a merger of the Federation Party and the National Democratic Party.

Though it claims to represent all Fiji Islanders, it is supported, in practice, almost exclusively by Indo-Fijians whose ancestors had come to Fiji between 1879 and 1916, mostly as indentured labourers. However, in the 2018 general election, the party recorded a considerable change in its support base due to the inclusion of more indigenous Fijian candidates.

== History ==
=== The formation of the Federation Party and the 1965 conference ===
The formation of the Federation Party was a direct consequence of the dispute between cane farmers and the Colonial Sugar Refining Company (CSR) in 1960 regarding the new cane contract. Farmers contested the 1963 Legislative Council election under the banner of Citizens Federation. This party was reconstituted as the Federation Party on 21 June 1964, with A. D. Patel as president and Sidiq Koya as vice-president. The merger took place in time for the party to participate in the 1965 constitutional conference which was called to map out a path towards independence from the United Kingdom. The British Government decided to introduce cross-voting as a compromise between the Fijian and European delegates on one side and the Indians on the other; nine of the 36 seats on the Legislative Council would be elected by universal suffrage, but allocated by ethnicity, divided equally among Fijians, Indians, and general electors (which consist of Caucasians, Chinese, and other minorities). The Legislative Council was enlarged to 36 members, consisting of 14 Fijians (9 elected on communal roll, 3 on cross-voting roll and two nominated by the Great Council of Chiefs), 12 Indians (9 elected on communal roll and 3 on cross-voting roll) and 10 Europeans (7 elected on communal roll and 3 on cross-voting roll). Some of the non-contentious proposals by the Federation Party were accepted. These were the establishment of a Public Service Commission, a Police Service Commission, and a Judicial and Legal Services Commission, as well as a Bill of Rights.

=== From 1966 until the death of A.D. Patel ===
The outcome of the constitutional conference was a major issue during the election, which was the first election in Fiji contested on Party lines. The Federation Party was expected to win at least the three cross-voting seats in the western division because of its predominantly Indian population but managed to win only the 9 Indian communal seats. The Alliance Party won 22 seats but the three independents and the two Council of Chiefs nominees joined it to give it a total strength of 27. Ratu Kamisese Mara of the Alliance Party became the Chief Minister and A.D. Patel became the Leader of the Opposition.

Ethnic tensions escalated following the adoption of responsible government in 1967, when Patel's arch-rival, the Lauan chief Ratu Kamisese Mara was appointed Chief Minister on 20 September. Mara's Alliance Party was a coalition of indigenous and European factions, with minimal Indo-Fijian participation. Patel and the NFP were consigned to the opposition benches. In protest at the new government's refusal to call a second constitutional conference, Patel led the nine Federation Party legislators in a mass walkout in September 1967. Missing two consecutive sections of the Legislative Council resulted in the forfeit of their seats, forcing by-elections. The ensuing by-elections were marked by inter-ethnic violence. All nine Federation Party legislators were returned with increased majorities, winning 78.55% of the votes cast. A.D. Patel won by 7903 votes to 2772 for Manikam Pillai. There were demonstrations by ethnic Fijians and calls to not renew native land leases and extreme elements called for Indians to be deported from Fiji. Relations between the Indo-Fijian and indigenous communities were at a new low.

=== The Formation of the National Federation Party ===
In November 1968, the Federation merged with the National Democratic Party to form the National Federation Party. Patel and Koya became the President and Vice-President, respectively, of the merged party. Apisai Tora and Isikeli Nadalo, both indigenous Fijians, were leading figures in the NDP, and the merger brought well-known Fijians into the party for the first time. The attempt to position itself as a multi-racial party failed to translate into significant electoral support in the indigenous Fijian community. The NFP never succeeded in getting ten percent of the Fijian vote at any poll. It did, however, manage to elect several Fijians to what became the House of Representatives after independence in 1970, owing to cross-voting in the renamed national constituencies.

Less than a year after the founding of the NFP, Patel died suddenly on 1 October 1969. His deputy, Siddiq Moidin Koya, succeeded him as party leader.

=== NFP under the leadership of Sidiq Koya ===
==== NFP and Alliance work together to attain independence ====
The party played an important role in the negotiations that led to Fiji's independence from the United Kingdom in 1970. Their original demand for a universal franchise threatened to stall the independence process, but at a conference in London in April 1970, Sidiq Koya, eventually negotiated a compromise with Ratu Sir Kamisese Mara, the leader of the Alliance Party, the main ethnic Fijian-dominated party. According to this compromise, ethnic Fijians and Indo-Fijians would each be allocated 22 seats, with 12 representing Communal constituencies (comprising voters registered as members of a particular ethnic group) and a further 10 representing National constituencies (distributed by ethnicity but elected by universal suffrage) in the 52 member House of Representatives. A further 8 seats would be reserved for General electors (Europeans, Chinese, and other minorities); 3 of these would be "communal" and 5 "national."

With the leaders of both major ethnic groups working together for the first time in Fiji's history, the transition to independence was peaceful and the euphoria of independence continued for some time. Sidiq Koya travelled with the Prime Minister to India and the United Nations and there was talk of a coalition government. There were those within the National Federation Party (NFP) who were not happy with the close relationship between Sidiq Koya and Ratu Kamisese Mara, the most notable of whom was R. D. Patel, but for the time being dissent was not being expressed openly.

==== The 1972 general election ====
The first general election since independence was held in May 1972 without the ethnic tension characteristic of the 1966 general election and the 1968 by-elections. The NFP won only 19 of the 52 seats in the House of Representatives, with Alliance Party actually increasing its share of the Indian vote. After the election, R.D. Patel, one of Koya's critics within the NFP, was elected speaker of the House of Representatives.

==== Worsening relationship between Koya and Mara ====
From mid-1975, the relationship between Koya and Mara worsened. This was firstly due to the announcement by the Minister of Education that the Government would not subsidise school fees for non-Fijians. Sidiq Koya called this "a blatant piece of racial injustice". Secondly when a former Alliance member moved a motion calling for the repatriation of people of Indian origin back to India, Koya was not happy with the measured response of the Alliance Government and accused it of "having elements which wanted to do legally what the Fijian Nationalist Party Leader, Sakeasi Butadroka, was trying to do illegally." Thirdly, the Prime Minister rejected the recommendations of the Royal Commission which investigated the voting system, claiming that implementation of the recommendation would cause bloodshed in the country.

==== Split within NFP ====
The inability of the NFP to make significant inroads into the ethnic Fijian vote kept the party in opposition in the years following independence. In the March 1977 election, however, a split in the ethnic Fijian vote enabled the NFP to win a plurality in the House of Representatives. Internal dissension, however, prevented the party from forming a government, as the party fractured over disputes about the leadership and the allocation of ministerial positions. The Governor-General, Ratu Sir George Cakobau, reappointed the defeated Prime Minister, Ratu Mara, and ordered a new election for September that year, in which the NFP was heavily defeated. For more information, see Fiji Constitutional Crisis of 1977.

=== NFP under the leadership of Jai Ram Reddy ===
A second election to resolve the impasse was held in September that year, resulting in a heavy defeat for the NFP after it had split into two factions known as the Dove and Flower factions. Koya lost his parliamentary seat to Jai Ram Reddy, who became the new leader of the NFP. Koya's Dove faction had won only 3 seats compared to 12 won by the Flower faction.

Reddy followed a policy, which had been tried once before by Koya, that of moderation in which he sought to work with the Alliance Party to bring about change instead of resorting to the divisive policies of A.D. Patel and the later years of Koya's leadership. He enjoyed a brief period of honeymoon with the Alliance and there was again talk of a coalition. Relations between the two sides deteriorated as the Alliance used its massive majority to push through legislations seen to be anti-Indian. In 1980, after Reddy criticised, Alliance's policy of reserving Crown land for use by ethnic Fijians only, he and Ratu Kamisese Mara were no longer on speaking terms.

The NFP re-united for the 1982 elections and came close to winning the election by winning 24 seats in coalition with the Western United Front (WUF). Reddy's disagreement with the Alliance Speaker of the House led to his walkout in December 1983 and to resignation from parliament in April 1984.

=== Sidiq Koya's second term as party leader ===
Sidiq Koya, who had returned to Parliament in 1982 under a unified NFP, was elected the leader following Reddy's resignation. He was not far from controversy, and was accused of favouring his own supporters for crucial appointments within the party. He barred the NFP Youth Wing from a Working Committee meeting further raising allegations of dictatorial rule.

Internal dissension reached a climax when a Koya supporter from Ba, Dr Balwant Singh Rakkha, was selected to contest the Lautoka seat vacated by Reddy's resignation. The NFP Youth Wing, put up its own candidate, Davendra Singh, a little-known small businessman. The NFP Youth Wing had the support of the former Flower faction and also claimed Reddy's support. For his part, Reddy did not openly campaign for either candidate. During the campaign, Koya turned the election into a referendum on himself, and threatened to resign if Rakkha lost. The result was a win for Singh by a narrow margin but Koya did not go ahead with his threat.

With the emergence of Fiji Labour Party (FLP), the NFP lost further ground. In the Suva City Council election of October 1985, it failed to field any candidate and the FLP won most seats and occupied the Lord Mayor's chair. In the by-election for the North Central National Seat (based in Ba district), brought about by the resignation of Vijay R. Singh, the Alliance won by a narrow margin over the FLP candidate, Mahendra Chaudhry. NFP was placed last. In December 1985, three prominent NFP parliamentarians resigned.

With his party falling apart, Koya resigned from the leadership of the NFP and was replaced by Harish Sharma.

=== Coalition with FLP ===
For the 1987 election, therefore, they formed an electoral coalition with the Fiji Labour Party under the leadership of Timoci Bavadra, an ethnic Fijian. The coalition won the election, but the new government was overthrown a month later in a military coup led by Lieutenant Colonel Sitiveni Rabuka.

A new Constitution was promulgated, providing for a built-in ethnic Fijian majority in the legislature. This condemned the NFP to permanent opposition status. When the government agreed to revise the Constitution in 1997, however, the NFP, now led by Jai Ram Reddy, played a key role in the ensuing negotiations, which resulted in the removal of the guaranteed ethnic Fijian majority from Parliament. In the election that followed in 1999, the NFP surprised many observers by forming an electoral coalition with the Soqosoqo ni Vakavulewa ni Taukei, led by their former enemy, Prime Minister Sitiveni Rabuka. This may have been a tactical mistake: many Indo-Fijians had not forgiven Rabuka for his role in the overthrow of the Bavadra government and the subsequent drafting of a constitution that they widely considered to be racist, and the NFP, for the first time in 36 years, lost all of its seats in the House of Representatives.

=== 2000–2006 ===
The NFP contested the 2001 election, on a platform calling for the establishment of a Truth and Reconciliation Commission to look into the Fiji coup of 2000, which had deposed the elected government of Prime Minister Mahendra Chaudhry, the removal of Value added tax from basic items, reduction of telephone and postal bills, national healthcare insurance for all workers, and consolidation of the independence of the judiciary. Its fortunes sank further, however. The NFP ended up with only about ten percent of the popular vote and only one parliamentary seat – which it subsequently lost in a court challenge. The party's refusal to agree to a preference deal with its one-time ally, the Fiji Labour Party, also worked against it. (At the time, Fiji had a system of preferential voting, similar to Australia's).

There were subsequently signs of a modest revival of fortunes for the NFP. Municipal elections in October 2003, for which the party formed an electoral coalition with Prime Minister Laisenia Qarase's Soqosoqo Duavata ni Lewenivanua (SDL), gave the party control of six municipalities, either in its own right or together with the SDL. Its more significant victories included gaining control of the Nadi Town Council and re-electing Chandu Umaria as Mayor of Suva. In the 2005 municipal polls, their performance was more modest, but Ba and Nadi remained in NFP hands, while an NFP/SDL coalition retained its hold on Sigatoka. In Suva, despite losing some seats, the NFP still out-polled the Fiji Labour Party, its arch-rival for the Indo-Fijian vote.

In the early 2000s, the party attempted to modernise itself. Under the presidency of Dorsami Naidu, the party made an effort to broaden its appeal to women and the disadvantaged. On 11 April 2005, Naidu announced that the NFP now regarded itself as a multiracial party and would attempt to win the support of all ethnic communities in Fiji.

==== The Reconciliation, Tolerance, and Unity Bill ====
In 2005, the NFP was at the forefront of opposition to the government's controversial proposal to establish a Reconciliation and Unity Commission, with the power (subject to presidential approval), to grant compensation to victims of the coup d'état that deposed the elected government in 2000, and amnesty to persons convicted of offences related to it. On 14 May 2005, Naidu called legislation to establish the commission "an act of terrorism", and on 20 May he went on to call for public demonstrations against the bill, which he said was "just a cover for providing amnesty to people who committed the May 2000 coup crime acts." On 27 June, Naidu announced that the NFP had started a petition against the bill, and expected to gather 150,000 signatures. The party was sending copies of the petition, along with a statement of the party's objections to the bill in English, Fijian, and Hindustani to all schools, other organisations, and islands in Fiji. Naidu said the party was opposed not only to the amnesty provisions of the legislation, but also to its compensation provisions, saying that the taxpayer should not have to foot the bill. "Those part and parcel of the 2000 coup should have their properties seized and sold to pay compensation to those affected," Naidu said. He thought, moreover, that those wanting to claim compensation should do so through the courts. He said that the petition would be presented to the parliamentary committee on Justice, Law and Order, along with the party's submission.

==== Party conference, July 2005 ====
Naidu resigned from the presidency of the party in July 2005, following his arrest on common assault and sexual assault charges. At the party's annual conference attended by more than 600 delegates in Nausori on 31 July, Raman Pratap Singh, a lawyer and former parliamentarian, was elected to replace him.

==== Towards 2006 ====
A priority for the NFP was to attempt to revive sufficient support to gain Parliamentary representation in the general election scheduled for 2006. On 12 August 2005, Pramod Rae said the party was experiencing financial difficulties. Speaking on Radio Sargam, he denied perceptions that the NFP was a "rich man's party" and said that sometimes it could not afford telephone bills, and was having to go door to door asking for donations to keep it going. Many businessmen who had once supported the NFP were now supporting the Fiji Labour Party (FLP), he lamented.

Under Fiji's so-called alternative ballot system, votes cast for low-polling candidates may be transferred to higher-polling candidates, as specified by the candidates. These transferred votes are known as "preferences." Rae said on 20 August that in pursuing negotiations with other parties for exchanges of preferences, the NFP would aim to hold the centre ground in Fijian politics and would forge alliances with parties that shared its philosophy. NFP Treasurer Ashok Bal Govind said on 21 October that neither the FLP nor the SDL had "good policies," and that the NFP would wait to see whether parties with "better policies" emerged before deciding on any electoral pacts. In the end, the NFP made arrangements with FLP candidates in some constituencies, and with SDL candidates in others.

===== Negotiations with the SDL =====
At the August conference, the party decided that a preference deal with the ruling SDL in the parliamentary election scheduled for 2006 would be conditional on the government withdrawing its Reconciliation and Unity Bill. In the last election in 2001, a similar deal, which allowed votes cast for low-polling NFP candidates to be transferred to the SDL, was crucial to the SDL victory under Fiji's transferable voting system. "You are in power today because of our preferential votes NFP gave you in 2001," said Pramod Rae, the general secretary of the party. "If you are going to pass this bill, do not count on us. We will not support you if you rail road this evil bill in Parliament."

Fiji Village reported on 9 March 2006 that Prime Minister Qarase had offered the NFP Cabinet posts, assuming the party won parliamentary representation, in exchange for a preference deal.

===== Negotiations with the FLP =====
A meeting, described as a "courtesy call", took place between officials of the NFP and the FLP on 18 August 2005. Preferential voting was among the topics discussed, but no serious negotiations were entered into, with both parties indicating that such a move would be premature. Nevertheless, a flurry of media speculation followed, with several major news services reporting in early September that the two parties were close to reaching a deal. Comments by FLP officials led credence to these rumours. On 19 September, however, Pratap Singh distanced himself and his party from the speculation that a deal with the FLP was likely. The NFP did not believe that the FLP truly represented the Indo-Fijian community, he said, who had gained nothing from what he called the "confrontational" posturing of the FLP.

According to the Fiji Sun (27 February 2006), NFP trustee Attar Singh accused the FLP of having stolen the NFP's 1982 election manifesto and using it for the 1999 election. FLP Parliamentarian Lekh Ram Vayshnoi rejected the charge as false.

=== 2006 election result ===
The election, which was finally held on 6–13 May 2006, was a disaster for the NFP. Its share of the popular vote fell to 6 percent, its lowest ever, and the party again failed to win parliamentary representation.

=== Post-2006 ===
In 2006 the Fijian government was overthrown and the Fijian parliament dissolved in a military coup. In January 2013 the military regime promulgated new regulations governing the registration of political parties, requiring all parties to have at least 5,000 members. The NFP applied for registration on 14 February, becoming one of only two existing parties to do so. Registration was granted on 3 May 2013.

The NFP elected Biman Prasad, Professor of Economics at the University of the South Pacific, as its new leader in March 2014, while Roko Tupou Draunidalo, scion of a distinguished political and chiefly family, was elected President of the party. Three NFP candidates, including Prasad and Draunidalo, were returned in the 2014 elections, the first since the 2006 coup. Prasad was the NFP Leader in Parliament and Shadow Minister for Economy from 2014 to 2022.

In June 2016, Draunidalo made remarks against the Fijian Minister for Education, Mahendra Reddy asking him if he thought the opposition side were "dumb natives" for which she was taken to the Privileges Committee who recommended that she was suspended from parliament for the remainder of the term of Parliament which ends in 2018. In January 2017 she resigned from the NFP and from parliament. Her seat was taken by Parmod Chand.

The party ran 51 candidates in the 2018 elections, ten of which were women. It gained 33,515 votes, increasing its vote share to 7.38%, but gained just three seats.

On April 8, 2022, the party formed an electoral pact with the People's Alliance, led by Sitiveni Rabuka to contest the upcoming general election. It was the second time the party allied itself with Rabuka, the last being in 1999, when the NFP, then led by Jai Ram Reddy, formed a coalition with the Rabuka-led Soqosoqo ni Vakavulewa ni Taukei (SVT). The NFP-SVT coalition was wiped out, with the SVT winning only 8 seats, and the NFP winning none.

In the 2022 elections, the party fielded 55 candidates, 5 of which were elected: Biman Prasad, who won 11,355 votes; Lenora Qereqeretabua, who won 3,741 votes; Agni Deo Singh, who won 2,308 votes; Pio Tikoduadua, who won 2,222 votes and lastly Sashi Kiran, who managed to garner 2,024 votes. The party, in total won 41,830 votes, or 8.9%, an increase from its 2018 total. It managed to form a coalition government with the People's Alliance and the Social Democratic Liberal Party (SODELPA), and elect Sitiveni Rabuka as Prime Minister, ending 16 years of the Bainimarama Prime Ministership. Its leader, Biman Prasad, was subsequently named Deputy Prime Minister, Minister of Finance, Strategic Planning, National Development and Statistics. Tikoduadua was given the role of Minister of Home Affairs, while Qereqeretabua was elected Deputy Speaker of Parliament. It was the first time in more than 30 years that the NFP was in government, the last being in 1987, when it was a coalition partner to the 1-month Bavadra Government.

== Party leadership ==
Party leadership has been divided between leader of the party and the president of the party. The leaders of the party have been: A. D. Patel 1968–1969, Sidiq Koya 1969–1977, Jai Ram Reddy 1977–1984, Sidiq Koya 1984–1986, Harish Sharma 1986–1992, Jai Ram Reddy 1992–1999, Biman Prasad 2001, Attar Singh 2001–?, Prem Singh ?–2004, Dorsami Naidu 2004–2005, Raman Pratap Singh 2005–2014 and Biman Prasad since 2014.

== Electoral history ==
=== Parliamentary elections ===
Election	Party leader	Votes	%	Seats	+/–	Position	Result
1972	Sidiq Koya	241,866	33.9%	19 / 52	▲19	▲2nd	Opposition
Mar 1977	Sidiq Koya	332,764	45.2%	26 / 52	▲7	2nd	Opposition
Sep 1977	Jai Ram Reddy	320,813	44.3%	15 / 52	▼11	2nd	Opposition
1982	Jai Ram Reddy	403,548	41.2%	22 / 52	▲7	2nd	Opposition
1987 (Note: Ran as part of NFP–FLP Coalition.)	Harish Sharma	461,056	47.1%	28 / 52	▲6	▲1st	FLP–NFP coalition government
1992	Harish Sharma	56,951	16.1%	14 / 70	▼14	▼2nd	Opposition
1994	Jai Ram Reddy	63,097	17.8%	20 / 70	▲6	2nd	Opposition
1999	Jai Ram Reddy	104,985	14.6%	0 / 70	▼20	▼3rd	Extra-parliamentary
2001	Attar Singh	32,961	10.1%	1 / 71	▲1	3rd	Opposition
2006	Raman Pratap Singh	47,615	6.2%	0 / 71	▼1	3rd	Extra-parliamentary
2014	Biman Prasad	27,066	5.5%	3 / 50	▲3	3rd	Opposition
2018	Biman Prasad	33,515	7.38%	3 / 51	0	3rd	Opposition
2022	Biman Prasad	41,830	8.89%	5 / 55	▲2	3rd	PAP–NFP–SODELPA coalition government
