= Fiji Indian organisations =

This is a synopsis of organizations formed by Indians in Fiji. When they became free from the bondage of indenture and were able to organize themselves, they founded numerous organizations to seek social and political justice. These organizations promoted the teaching of Indian languages and religious practices and also to help others in time of need. Some of the successful organizations are listed below in the order in which they were established. Some, such as the National Federation Party, are no longer exclusively Indian, but are still predominantly so.

== British Indian Association (1911) ==
The British Indian Association was established in 1911, following a severe hurricane that had brought much hardship to the Fiji Indians in the Central Division. It was formed by a group that included J.P. Maharaj (a Suva Storekeeper), Totaram Sanadhya (a pundit and social worker from Rewa), Ram Singh (a Suva printer) and Ram Rup. The meeting was chaired by Shriyut Rupram and discussed grievances such as the lack of educated leadership amongst the Fiji Indians and the dependence on European lawyers. Totaram Sanadhya was responsible for its Hindi language correspondence.

== Indian Imperial Association (1918) ==
The Indian Imperial Association (I.I.A.) came into existence in Fiji on 2 June 1918 to further the well-being of the Indian settlers in Fiji. Manilal Doctor became its first President and Ram Singh its Secretary. The association contained mainly educated Fiji Indians. It sent petitions to the Government seeking review of marriage law, an end to the death penalty and representation into the Legislative Council. The aim of the association was to ‘watch the interests of and to assist in the general improvement of the Indian community in Fiji’. As president of the I.I.A., Manilal Doctor wrote to Gandhi, other Indian leaders and the British Labour Party on the sad plight of Indian indentured laborers in Fiji. Following, the strike of 1920, the I.I.A. organized petitions in different languages, asking for Manilal to be allowed to stay in Fiji but after he was deported from Fiji in 1920, the I.I.A. collapsed.

== Arya Pratinidhi Sabha of Fiji (1918) ==
The Arya Pratinidhi Sabha of Fiji (Arya Representative Society), the national body for all the Arya Samajs in Fiji, was formed in 1918, although Arya Samaj had existed in Fiji since 1904. Its first President was Swami Manoharanand Saraswati. The Arya Pratinidhi Sabha of Fiji is affiliated to Sarvadeshik Arya Pratinidhi Sabha (World Council of Arya Samaj) based in New Delhi. Immediately after its formation the Sabha went about establishing schools in Fiji, with the first one, Gurukul Primary School, established in 1918 in Saweni, Lautoka. The Sabha owns and manages 14 pre-schools, 18 primary schools, 7 secondary schools, a commercial school, a religious training center, a youth development center and has provided the facilities and resources for the establishment of the University of Fiji.

== Indian Cane Growers Association (1919) ==
The Indian Cane Growers Association was formed on 28 September 1919 and was based in Ba district, one of the cane growing districts in the Western Division of Fiji. It was led by a former overseer of the Colonial Sugar Refining Company and included some well-to-do Indian cane farmers from Ba. The Association proposed a scheme for co-operative stores and an agricultural bank financed by the Colonial Sugar Refining Company but the company refused to finance it. The Association asked for a higher price and Indian cane farmers refused to plant any more cane. The company made concessions, although it refused to guarantee the price increases for future years and refused to continue the bonus in 1921.

== Indian Association of Fiji (1920) ==
The Indian Association of Fiji was formed in 1920 by N. B. Mitter, who was the headmaster of a school in Nadi. The Association organized laborers from the Western Division, which included Ba, Nadi, Lautoka and Nadroga. In the early 1920s Ram Singh tried to revive the defunct Indian Imperial Association as the Indian Association of Fiji but having representatives from all sections of the Indian community. It made representations to the Secretary of State for the Colonies about residential tax and other issues, but the Government regarded it as representing only the urban educated Indians and refused to recognize it. On 9 December 1934, The Indian Association was reformed, this time as a successor to the Fiji Indian National Congress. Its president was A. D. Patel and Vishnu Deo was its secretary. The Association made representations to England and India opposing the proposal for a purely nominated system of choosing members to the Legislative Council. In 1935, the Association protested to restrictions to Indian immigration to Fiji.

== Indian Reform League (1924) ==
The Indian Reform League was formed in Fiji in 1924, following the refusal of the Suva Y.M.C.A. to admit Indians. Its founder was A.W. McMillan of the New Zealand Y.M.C.A and educated Indians and Government clerks and interpreters. Its aim was to carry out social work and apply pressure for social reform, like changes to marriage laws. Since most of its members were Indian Christians, it soon acquired a sectional character. It provided volunteer nurses during the typhoid epidemic of 1925. It had a women's wing known as the Stri Sewa Sabha (Women's Service League), founded in 1934, which carried out social work amongst Fiji Indian women. The League encouraged participation in sports, including in cricket, football, hockey and lawn tennis. The League was instrumental in the formation of the Suva Football Association, which was one of the original Associations that formed the Fiji Indian Football Association.

== Then India Sanmarga Ikya Sangam (1926) ==
The Then India Sanmarga Ikya Sangam (பிறகு இந்திய சன்மார்க்க ஐக்கிய சங்கம்) was founded in Fiji by Sadhu Kuppuswami, an ex-indentured laborer, who inspired South Indians to form an organization to promote their language and culture. On 10 January 1926, while celebrating the birth of Swami Vivekananda in Rakiraki, attended by people of all districts, the idea of forming the South Indian organization was proposed. On 24 May 1926, at a meeting in Nadi, the Then India Sanmargya Ikya Sangam (TISI Sangam) was formed with Sadhu Swami. Sadhu Kuppuswami was elected the first President of Sangam and he remained its president for his lifetime. On 26 December 1927, the Madras Maha Sangam, was formed in Suva by Verrappa Muthiah Pillai in Suva and branches were soon established in Levuka and Labasa. In 1937 the Madras Maha Sangam merged with the TISI Sangam. The arrival of Swami Avinashananda and Swami Rudrananda from the Ramakrishna Mission of India provided impetus to the Sangam which proceeded to promote South Indian language and culture.

== Fiji Muslim League (1926) ==
The Fiji Muslim League is a Muslim religious and social organization based in Suva, Fiji. The League was formed on 31 October 1926, at a meeting at the Jame Masjid in Toorak, although a number of Muslim organizations had existed in Fiji since 1908. The League has made valuable contribution in the field of education in Fiji. The first school, Islamic Girls School, was already in existence in 1926. Today, the League owns and manages seventeen primary and five secondary schools plus a tertiary institution. Besides education, the League from its outset has attempted to assist in satisfying all the social needs of Muslims. Currently its involvement in social welfare is both at national and branch levels. In times of natural disasters or turmoil the League directly helps Muslims whose homes and lives are disrupted. Its charity keeps many Muslim families clothed, fed and housed, and helps them send their children to school. Since 1929 the Fiji Muslim League has sought to obtain separate representation for Muslims, in the Legislative Council till 1970, and in Parliament (both the House of Representatives and the Senate) since 1970.

== Hindu Maha Sabha (1926) ==
Hindu Maha Sabha was an organization representing various Hindu organizations and was formed in Fiji in late 1926, following the formation of All-India Hindu Maha Sabha in India. Although the organisation was formed to unite all the Hindu groups, its leadership soon came under the control of the better organized Arya Samajis. When Shri Krishna Sharma arrived in Fiji in 1927, he assumed leadership of the Sabha. The Hindu Maha Sabha (and the Fiji Muslim League) contested with the Indian Reform League (mainly supported by Indian Christians) for the right to represent Indians. The Sabha was organized at village level into sangathans (religious unions) and was led in the Suva-Nausori area by Vishnu Deo, K. B. Singh, Kundan Singh Kush and the western districts of Viti Levu by Chattur Singh and Sahodar Singh. Conflict with Muslims and orthodox Hindus led to court action and a conviction in the early 1930s and the Sabha ceased to represent all the Hindu organizations in Fiji.

== Fiji Indian National Congress (1929) ==
The Fiji Indian National Congress started as two different organizations, one formed by Vishnu Deo in Lautoka on 12 October 1929 and another formed by Dr Hamilton Beattie in Suva on 14 October 1929. As both organizations had the same aim, S. B. Patel was able to persuade them to amalgamate on 7 November 1929 to form a single organization. The aim of the Congress was to improve the status of the Fiji Indians by uniting the Indians and demanding common franchise. Vishnu Deo tried to model the Congress on the Indian National Congress, but it failed when non-Hindu members left following disagreement over the distribution of relief funds following floods in 1930.

== Fiji Teachers Union (1929) ==
Fiji Teachers Union is a union representing school teachers in Fiji. It had its beginning when on 7 December 1929, an organization known as the Teachers' Association of Fiji was formed in Lautoka, with Pandit Ami Chandra as president and W. K. Phillip as Secretary. The aim of this Association was to improve the standard of education in Fiji schools, to raise the status and to improve and safeguard the conditions of employment of its members and to work for the betterment of the community as a whole. Its membership was open to all teachers whether from Fiji or overseas, whose certification was approved by the Department of Education of Fiji. Later this Association became the Fiji Teachers Union. Although it is a multi-racial organization, the overwhelming majority of its members are of Indian origin.

== Fiji Bharatiya Mazdur Sangh (1930) ==
The Fiji Bharatiya Mazdur Sangh (Fiji Indian Labor Union) was a short-lived union formed in June 1930 by Vishnu Deo and K. B. Singh for the benefit of the newly arrived Punjabi immigrants who were finding it hard to find employment in Fiji.

== Ahmadiyya Anjuman Ishaat-i-Islam (1933) ==
Ahmadiyya Anjuman Ishaat-i-Islam was formed in 1933 by some educated Muslims in Fiji who had earlier led the Fiji Muslim League but lost control of the League they offended the majority of Muslims in Fiji, who are Sunnis, by bringing Ahmadiyya missionaries from India. Some prominent Fiji Muslim who were Ahmadiyyas were Mohammed Towahir Khan and Mohammed Sahu Khan of Lautoka, and X.K.N. Dean of Suva.

== Kisan Sangh (1937) ==
Kisan Sangh (Farmers Union) was the first successful farmers' union formed in Fiji on 27 November 1937 by Ayodhya Prasad. After initially opposing its formation, the Government and the sole sugar milling company in Fiji, Colonial Sugar Refining Company (CSR), were forced to recognize the Sangh as it gained support from most of the farmers and in 1941 won major gains for sugar cane farmers. This early success was not to be repeated with the formation of rival unions and the use of unions as power base for political aspirants. It gradually lost support and at present has an insignificant influence on Fiji's sugar industry.

== Fiji Indian Football Association (1938) ==
The Fiji Indian Football Association was formed under the leadership of Arthur Stanley Farebrother, a Suva businessman, as teams from Suva, Rewa, Ba, Levuka and Lautoka gathered in Suva for an inter-district tournament on 8 October 1938. The first inter-district football tournament was played for the Lloyd - Farebother trophy donated by Lloyd and Company and A.S. Farebrother and Company. The following year Nadi, Nadroga and Rakiraki also joined the Association. In 1943 Navua and Tailevu/Naitasiri joined the Association and Taveuni joined in 1947. In 1958, when the association celebrated its 21st inter-district tournament, 14 districts took part.

== Dakshina India Andhra Sangam (1941) ==
The Dakshina India Andhra Sangam of Fiji was formed on 20 April 1941, under the leadership of Alipati Tataiya and Veeranna, at the Gallau Temple in Ra. The aim of the new Sangam was to promote Telugu language and culture. Initially Telugus in Fiji were members of the TISI Sangam, but its domination by the more numerous Tamils led to the formation of the Andhra Sangam.

== Maha Sangh (1941) ==
Akhil Fiji Krishak Maha Sangh (All Fiji Farmers’ Grand Union) was a sugar cane farmers' union formed on 15 June 1941 in opposition to the existing union, the Kisan Sangh. The people responsible for the formation of a second sugar cane farmers' union in Fiji were A. D. Patel and Swami Rudrananda. The union was supported mainly by the South Indian sugar cane farmers in Fiji. The Maha Sangh provided the support base for the launch of the political career of A. D. Patel. The Sangh was one of the unions that joined the umbrella organization, the Federation of Cane Growers to negotiate the 1960 sugar cane contract with the CSR and remained within this organization as it grew to be a fully fledged union. The original members of the Sangh remained the main support base for the Federation of Cane Growers and its successor, the Fiji Cane Growers Association.

== Maunatul Islam Association of Fiji (1942) ==
Maunatul Islam Association of Fiji (MIAF) represents approximately 30% of the Sunni Muslims in Fiji who are mostly followers of Imam Shafi. The followers of Imam Shafi in Fiji are the descendants of Muslims of Malayalam origin who came to Fiji under the indenture system from Kerala in South India between 1903 and 1916. The other Sunni Muslim organization in Fiji, the Fiji Muslim League, represents all other Sunni Muslims in Fiji who are mostly followers of Imam Hanafi. The organization originally operated under the name of Then India Maunatul Islam Association of Fiji since it was officially formed in 1942. One of the most prominent past President and Speaker of the Association was the late Hon S.M. Koya.

== Rewa Planters Union (1943) ==
The Rewa Planters Union was formed on 14 July 1943 at a meeting attended by 1500 cane farmers from Rewa Province, Fiji. The union was formed in reaction to the strike of cane farmers taking place in the Western Division. The Government had appointed a commission to inquire into the farmers' grievances and the Rewa farmers wanted to send a representative to it. The Rewa Planters Union took an active role in the negotiations for the 1950 cane contract. With the closure of the Nausori sugar mill in 1959, the union ceased to exist.

== Southern Division Kisan Sangh (1946) ==
The Southern Division Kisan Sangh was formed in 1946 by a former member of parliament, K. B. Singh, due to personal differences with the president of the Rewa Planters Union. There was widespread opposition to this until Vishnu Deo took over its leadership. The Southern Division Kisan Sangh took an active role in the negotiations for the 1950 cane contract. With the closure of the Nausori sugar mill in 1959, the union ceased to exist.

== Vishal Sangh (1946) ==
Vishal Sangh (Great Union) was a cane farmers union established in Fiji on 1 September 1946, by mainly Sikh farmers, who refused to re-join the Kisan Sangh after its reunification following the split of the Kisan Sangh into two factions in 1943. It was led by Mehar Singh, one of the founding members of the Kisan Sangh and its former vice-president. The Vishal Sangh played an active role in negotiations for cane contracts in 1950 and 1960 but always aligned itself with A. D. Patel and the Maha Sangh.

== Labasa Kisan Sangh (1950) ==
The Labasa Kisan Sangh (Labasa Farmers Union) was formed in 1950 as negotiations began for the new cane contract and was based on the island of Vanua Levu in Fiji. It was sponsored by the Kisan Sangh and Ayodhya Prasad based in the western districts of Viti Levu and was in competition of the Maha Sangh, which had also spread its activities to Vanua Levu. Due to its distance from the main island and communication problems, this union remained autonomous from the main body in Viti Levu and provided the political power base for Vijay R. Singh.

== Federation of Cane Growers (1959) ==
The Federation of Cane Growers was formed as an umbrella organization to negotiate the new cane contract due to take effect from 1960 with the Colonial Sugar Refining Company. Talks on the new contract started on 5 January 1960. The farmers’ representatives were from the Maha Sangh, the Vishal Sangh, the Labasa Kisan Sangh, and the Kisan Sangh. The united front did not last as the two Kisan Sanghs accepted the contract offered by the company while the Maha Sangh and Vishal Sangh opposed it and called their members out on strike.

== Ahmadiyya Muslim Community (1960) ==
The Ahmadiyya Muslim Community, although not an Indian only organization, it does however originate from India and many of the members in Fiji are of an Indian descent. The community also runs a school in Fiji, the Ahmadiyya Muslim school and holds the distinction of managing the largest mosque in the South Pacific, the Fazle Omar Mosque.

== Citizens Federation (1963) ==
The Federation of Cane Growers Committee contested the 1963 Legislative Council election under the banner of Citizens Federation. It was not a properly constituted political party but sought to promote economic, cultural and political progress and stability in a united Fiji. All three Citizen's Federation candidates were elected to the Legislative Council. In the Western Constituency, A.D. Patel defeated the president of the Kisan Sangh by 6244 votes to 3346, in the North Viti Levu Constituency, Sidiq Koya defeated James Shankar Singh by 3,998 votes to 3,480 and in the Northern Constituency James Madhavan defeated won by 2,753 votes to 2,175. There was no Citizens Federation candidate in the Southern Constituency, won by Andrew Deoki. All the three candidates opposing the Citizens Federation candidates were supporters of the Kisan Sangh

== Federation Party (1964) ==
The success of the Citizens Federation in the 1963 elections, and the impending constitutional convention, prompted A. D. Patel to transform the Citizens Federation into a fully fledged political party. The Federation Party came into existence on 21 June 1964, with A.D. Patel as president and S.M. Koya as vice-president. In 1968 it merged with the National Democratic Party to form the National Federation Party, which is still a player on the Fijian political scene.

== National Congress of Fiji (1965) ==
The National Congress of Fiji was formed on 10 January 1965 in Lautoka, Fiji by Ayodhya Prasad, the Secretary of the Kisan Sangh. The Congress sent a telegram to the Secretary General of the United Nations stating that 80,000 Fiji Indians wanted to settle in a foreign country. The telegram had the desired result, as under pressure from the United Nations the Colonial Secretary called a Constitutional Conference for 26 July 1965. Ayodhya The Congress was bitterly opposed to A. D. Patel and the Federation Party. In October 1965, Ayodhya Prasad met Ratu Kamisese Mara and suggested the establishment of a new political party made up of the Fijian Association and National Congress of Fiji. In the 1966 elections, two members of the Congress contested the election for the Alliance Party and lost. With Vijay R. Singh supporting direct membership of the Alliance, relations between him and Prasad worsened and the National Congress was wound up in 1967.
