= Indian Cane Growers Association =

Agricultural association of Indian cane farmers in Fiji (founded 1919)

- Formation: 28 September 1919
- Type: Agricultural association
- Headquarters: Ba Province, Western Division, Fiji
- Leader: Theodore Riaz
- Key people: Ramgarib Singh; Randhir Singh; Vashist Muni

The Indian Cane Growers Association was formed on 28 September 1919 and was based in Ba Province, one of the cane growing districts in the Western Division of Fiji. It was led by Theodore Riaz and included some well-to-do Indian cane farmers from Ba, like Ramgarib Singh and Randhir Singh. The Association proposed a scheme for co-operative stores and an agricultural bank financed by the Colonial Sugar Refining Company but the company refused to finance it. The Association asked for a higher price and Indian cane farmers refused to plant any more cane. The company made concessions, although it refused to guarantee the price increases for future years. The company refused to continue the bonus in 1921 and in the ensuing strike, it was Vashist Muni who assumed leadership of all cane farmers in Fiji.

== See also ==
- Kisan Sangh
- Vishal Sangh
- Maha Sangh
- Federation of Cane Growers
- National Farmers Union of Fiji
- Sugar Cane farmers unions in Fiji
