= Sugar cane grower associations in Fiji =

Farmer's union

Sugar cane grower associations in Fiji represent sugar cane farmers−growers both in contemporary Fiji and have a long history in the preceding British Colony of Fiji. They served as trade unions to collectively negotiate with sugar mills.

Some of the Fijian sugar cane growers associations had provincially based areas of suppoer, as indicated by their names: Nadroga Fijian Cane Growers Association in Nadroga-Navosa Province, the Ra Fijian Cane Growers Association in Ra Province, and the Ba Fijian Cane Growers Association in Ba Province. Other regionally based unions include Labasa Kisan Sangh, the Rewa Planters Union, and the Southern Division Kisan Sangh.

Other groups were formed to provide leverage to ethnic sections of the community, such as Indians in Fiji and indigenous Fijian people.

== History ==
The first cane grower association in Fiji was the Indian Cane Growers Association, established in 1919. It negotiated with the Colonial Sugar Refining Company, the predominant sugar cane plantations and raw sugar production company established in 1880. The 1921 strike by sugar cane farmers was a spontaneous action led by Vashist Muni.

Umbrella organisations were formed to present a united front in negotiating with the CSR and later the Fiji Sugar Corporation (FSC) (est. 1973). In 1959, the Federation of Cane Growers was formed, and in 1980 the Joint Committee of Cane Growers Associations was formed.

=== Organization by ethnicity ===
The Fijian cane growers unions were ethnically and provincially based as indicated by their names; Nadroga Fijian Cane Growers Association, the Ra Fijian Cane Growers Association, and the Ba Fijian Cane Growers Association. Some unions claimed to be open for everyone but their membership indicated sectional interest. For example, the Maha Sangh had a predominantly South Indian membership, the Vishal Sangh had a predominantly Sikh membership, and the Kisan Sangh had a predominantly North Indian membership.

In 1959, when the Federation of Cane Growers was negotiating the new cane contract with the Colonial Sugar Refining Company (CSR), three indigenous Fijian cane farmers unions were set up to send three Fijian delegates to the Federation although ethnic Fijians made up less than 5% of the cane farmers.

== List of organizations ==
Current and former sugar cane farmers−growers unions in Fiji, by date established, include:

- 1919 - Indian Cane Growers Association
- 1934 - Planters Association
- 1937 - Kisan Sangh
- 1941 - Maha Sangh
- 1953 - Rewa Planters Union
- 1946 - Vishal Sangh
- 1946 - Southern Division Kisan Sangh
- 1950 - Labasa Kisan Sangh
- 1959 - Federation of Cane Growers
- 1959 - Nadroga Fijian Cane Growers Association
- 1959 - Ra Fijian Cane Growers Association
- 1959 - Ba Fijian Cane Growers Association
- 1979 - National Farmers Union of Fiji
- 1980 - Joint Committee of Cane Growers Associations
- 1992 - Fiji Cane Growers Association

== See also ==
- Sugar industry in Fiji
- Trade unions in Fiji
