= Rewa Planters Union =

Rewa Planters Union (also known as Rewa Cane Growers Union) was formed on 14 July 1943 at a meeting attended by 1500 cane farmers from Rewa Province, Fiji. The union was formed in reaction to the strike of cane farmers taking place in the Western Division. The government had appointed a commission to inquire into the farmers' grievances and the Rewa farmers wanted to send a representative to it. The union was led by Ram Krishna Chaudhary with Faiz Mohammed as Secretary.

From 1946, the union worked closely with a second union established in the Rewa cane growing area, the Southern Division Kisan Sangh under the leadership of Vishnu Deo. This co-operation was a far cry from the rivalry that existed between the Kisan Sangh and Maha Sangh, the two major unions in the Western Division.

The Rewa Planters Union took an active role in the negotiations for the 1950 cane contract. With the closure of the Nausori sugar mill in 1959, the union ceased to exist.

== See also ==
- Southern Division Kisan Sangh
- Sugar Cane farmers unions in Fiji
