= Labasa Kisan Sangh =

The Kisan Sangh had been active in the Western Division of Fiji since 1937 but had not seen the need to expand its activities to other sugar cane growing districts because of transportation problems and the fact that the other districts combined had far fewer cane farmers than the Western Division. By 1950, the Maha Sangh, a rival to the Kisan Sangh, was well established in Labasa in the Northern Division. As negotiations began for the 1950 cane contract, the Kisan Sangh decided to spread its activities to the Northern Division and the Labasa Kisan Sangh was formed with support from Viti Levu.

After 1954, the leadership of the Labasa Kisan Sangh passed to young lawyer, Vijay R. Singh. The Labasa Kisan Sangh, remained autonomous from the main body based in Viti Levu mainly because of personal differences between Ayodhya Prasad and Vijay R. Singh. In 1959, the Labasa Kisan Sangh was one of the cane farmers unions which formed the Federation of Cane Growers to negotiate the new cane contract with the Colonial Sugar Refining Company. In 1960, the Labasa Kisan Sangh together with the Viti Levu-based Kisan Sangh, signed the cane contract in defiance of the majority of the members of the Federation. After Ayodhya Prasad's retirement from public life, Vijay R. Singh, who was then a Government Minister, became the nominal leader of the Kisan Sangh.

== See also ==
- Sugar Cane farmers unions in Fiji
