= Lautoka City (Indian Communal Constituency, Fiji) =

Former electoral constituency in Fiji

Lautoka City Indian Communal is a former electoral division of Fiji, one of 19 communal constituencies reserved for Indo-Fijians. Established by the 1997 Constitution, it came into being in 1999 and was used for the parliamentary elections of 1999, 2001, and 2006. (Of the remaining 52 seats, 27 were reserved for other ethnic communities and 25, called Open Constituencies, were elected by universal suffrage). The electorate covered the City of Lautoka, in the west of the main island of Viti Levu.

The 2013 Constitution promulgated by the Military-backed interim government abolished all constituencies and established a form of proportional representation, with the entire country voting as a single electorate.

== Election results ==
In the following tables, the primary vote refers to first-preference votes cast. The final vote refers to the final tally after votes for low-polling candidates have been progressively redistributed to other candidates according to pre-arranged electoral agreements (see electoral fusion), which may be customized by the voters (see instant run-off voting).

=== 1999 ===
Candidate	Political party	Votes	%
Ganeshwar Chand	Fiji Labour Party (FLP)	6,146	61.34
Jagannath Sami	National Federation Party (NFP)	3,720	37.13
Mohammed Rauf Khan	Party of National Unity (PANU)	153	1.53
Total		10,019	100.00

=== 2001 ===
Candidate	Political party	Votes	%
Ganeshwar Chand	Fiji Labour Party (FLP)	5,899	72.53
Faiaaz Ali	National Federation Party (NFP)	1,880	23.11
Hasmukh Chauhan	New Labour Unity Party	319	3.92
Beni Sami	Germit Heritage Party (GHP)	36	0.44
Total		8,134	100.00

=== 2006 ===
Candidate	Political party	Votes	%
Jai Gawander	Fiji Labour Party (FLP)	7,629	79.89
Rakesh Kumar	National Federation Party (NFP)	1,590	16.65
Rosemary Santanji	National Alliance Party (NAPF)	172	1.80
Azizul Dean	Soqosoqo Duavata ni Lewenivanua (SDL)	158	1.65
Total		9,549	100.00

== Sources ==
- Psephos - Adam Carr's electoral archive
- Fiji Facts
