= Paresh Narayan =

Australian economist (born 1977)

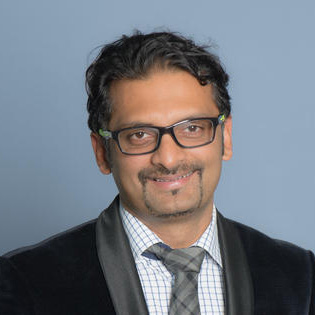
- Narayan in 2016
- Born: February 18, 1977 (age 49); Navua District, Fiji

Academic background
- Education: Monash University; University of the South Pacific

Academic work
- Discipline: Financial Econometrics; Finance; Energy Economics
- Institutions: Monash University; Deakin University; Griffith University; University of the South Pacific; Central Queensland University
- Awards: Mollie Hollman Medal (2004); Emerald Excellence in Research Award (2007); Scopus Young Researcher Award (2014); Mahatma Gandhi Pravasi Samman Award (2015); Gold Medal, The Indian Econometric Society (2015)
- Website: Information at IDEAS / RePEc

Paresh Kumar Narayan (born 18 February 1977), is a Fijian-Australian academic of Fiji Indian origin. He was Australia's youngest Professor of Finance, and is now at Monash University.

== Study in Australia ==
In 2001, he was awarded a Monash graduate school scholarship to study in Australia for three years. Narayan completed his PhD in 18 months. His doctorate thesis, An Econometric Model of Tourism Demand and a Computable General Equilibrium Analysis of the Impact of Tourism: The Case of Fiji Islands was assessed to be the most outstanding work, earning him the Mollie Hollman Medal in 2004 at Monash University.

== Employment History ==
On completion of his doctoral studies, Narayan was appointed a lecturer at the Griffith Business School, on the Gold Coast, Australia, and was promoted to senior lecturer in 2005. In 2006, he became associate professor.

Narayan is presently an Alfred Deakin Professor at the Deakin Business School. He is the Director of the Centre for Economics & Financial Econometrics Research at Deakin University. He is also an adjunct Professor of finance in INCEIF (International Centre for Education in Islamic Finance) Malaysia

== Papers and awards ==
He has published more than 130 papers in renowned journals all over the world.

He has written chapters in books like South Asia in the Era of Globalisation: Trade, Industrialisation and Welfare; Economic Impact of Fiji's Sugar Industry, CGE Modelling and Behaviour of J-Curve.

He is an advisor to Econtech, one of Australia's leading economic consultancy firms, and two years ago he won the prestigious Excellence in Research Award, which he received from the Emerald Institute, a leading publishing institute in United Kingdom.

In 2014, Narayan received the Scopus Young Researcher award for the best three authors in Australia in the Social Science category under the age of forty. In 2015, Narayan was awarded the Mahatma Gandhi Pravasi Samman Award for non-resident Indians who have made substantial contributions to the profession, including contributions to public policy. In 2015, he also received the Gold Medal and Citation by the Indian Econometric Society.

== View on Fijian Economy ==
Narayan blamed the ousted Qarase government and its failure to implement macroeconomic management and stability for the post coup economic decline in Fiji. Earlier he had criticized the Qarase Government's 2007 budget as being "economically sick".
