= Tulsi Ram Sharma =

Fijian politician

Member of Legislative Council (Fiji) for North Western Indian Division
- In office 1950–1953
- Preceded by: A. D. Patel
- Succeeded by: Ayodhya Prasad

Personal details
- Profession: Lawyer

Tulsi Ram Sharma MBE was the first Indo-Fijian to qualify as a lawyer. He served one term as member of the Legislative Council and three terms as the President of Fiji Indian Football Association. He was one of the founding members of the Maha Sangh, but his association with farmers' union was short-lived. In 1941 he was appointed to Central Indian War Committee, formed by the Government to enlist the support of Indians to the war effort.

== Member of Legislative Council ==
After completing his law degree, Tulsi Ram started practising in Lautoka. In 1950, the two main organisations active in politics in the sugar cane growing districts of Fiji were the farmers’ unions, Kisan Sangh and Maha Sangh. A. D. Patel was the incumbent for the North West Indian Division and had the support of Maha Sangh while the preferred candidate for Kisan Sangh was Ayodhya Prasad. When Tulsi Ram also put up his nomination, Ayodhya Prasad withdrew in his favour as he did not want to split the anti-Patel votes. With the support of the Kisan Sangh, Tulsi Ram won the election by 2340 votes to 1850 votes. After the election Tulsi Ram declared his neutrality as he wanted both farmers’ unions to work together. The Kisan Sangh withdrew its support for Tulsi Ram and he was destined to be a one-term member of the Legislative Council.

== President of Fiji Indian Football Association ==
Tulsi Ram Sharma was the second President of the Fiji Indian Football Association, taking over its leadership two years after its formation in 1938. He served three terms as President; 1940–1945, 1948–1950, and 1954. Under his leadership Football Associations were formed in most districts of Fiji and a regular inter-district soccer tournament was organised. He also encouraged the inclusion of players of all races in his Association, although it was not until 1961 that the name was changed to Fiji Football Association.

== Bibliography ==
- A.P. Sharma, Farmers Struggle in Fiji: a History of Fiji Kisan Sangh, Vicas Press, Lautoka, Fiji, 1962
- M. Prasad, Sixty Years of Soccer in Fiji 1938–1998: The Official History of Fiji Football Association, Fiji Football Association, Suva, 1998
