= Indian Association of Fiji =

Name to facilitate the plight of Indo-Fijians

The Indian Association of Fiji is the name used by organisations established in Fiji seeking to unite different groups within the Fiji Indian community to facilitate the plight of Indians in Fiji.

== Origins ==
Initially created in 1920 by Nk. B. Mitter(the headmaster of a school in Nadi), the Association organised labourers from the Western Division, such as Ba, Nadi, Lautoka and Nadroga. The Association did not have any influence on the 1921 strike which affected the western districts of Fiji as it was led by a recently arrived missionary from India, Vashist Muni.

The early 1920s were dark days for the Fiji Indians with the failure of the 1920 and 1921 strikes and large numbers of ex-indentured labourers waiting for ships to be repatriated back to India. In the early 1920s Ram Singh tried to revive the defunct Indian Imperial Association as the Indian Association of Fiji but having representatives from all sections of the Indian community, with Ilahi Ramjan (a Muslim) as President, Ram Singh (a Hindu) as Secretary and Deoki (a Christian) and Ram Samujh (a Hindu) as vice-presidents. It made representations to the Secretary of State for the Colonies about residential tax and other issues, but the Government regarded it as representing only the urban educated Indians and refused to recognise it.

On 9 December 1934, the Indian Association was reformed, this time as a successor to the controversial Fiji Indian National Congress (formed in 1929), to safeguard and further the political rights of the Indian community in Fiji. Its president was A. D. Patel and Vishnu Deo was its secretary. The Association made representations to England and India opposing the proposal for a purely nominated system of choosing members to the Legislative Council. In 1935, the Association protested to restrictions to Indian immigration to Fiji. In 1936, Charles Freer Andrews made his third visit to Fiji on the invitation of the Association.

The Association was revived in 1946, but this time it concentrated on education. It started two schools: Deenbandhu Primary School and Indian High School (now known as Jai Narayan College and which has, on record in the Fiji Islands Education System, the current best academic performance for over a decade ), both located in Samabula, Suva.

At the 26th Annual General Meeting of the Association, held at Indian High School, J. F. Grant retired as President and was replaced by Hari Charan.

== Bibliography ==
- Gillion, K. L. (1977). The Fiji Indians: Challenge to European Dominance 1920-1946. Australian National University Press, Canberra. pp. 51, 104, 117, 152, 155. ISBN 0-7081-1291-9.
- Sharma, Guru Dayal (1987). Memories of Fiji: 1887 - 1987. Guru Dayal Sharma, Suva, Fiji. pp. 75–76.
