= Rudrananda =

Rudrananda may refer to:

- Swami Rudrananda, Swami from Tamil Nadu (b. 1901)
- Rudi (Swami Rudrananda), Albert Rudolph, from Brooklyn, New York (1928–1973)
