= Jai Gawander =

Jai Shree Gawander

Member of House of Representatives (Fiji) Lautoka City Indian Communal Constituency
- In office 2006–2006
- Preceded by: Ganesh Chand
- Succeeded by: vacant

Personal details
- Party: Fiji Labour Party
- Profession: Agricultural Scientist
- Chief Executive of Sugar Cane Growers Council from 2007

Jai Shree Gawander is a Fijian civil servant and former politician of Indian descent. He was appointed the chief executive officer of the Sugar Cane Growers Council on 31 March 2007. He was previously a member of the House of Representatives and research manager at the Sugarcane Research Centre in Lautoka, Fiji.

== Sugarcane research ==
Gawander rose to prominence because of his research on plant nutrition, sugarcane agronomy and general management of sugarcane research in Fiji and the transfer of this information and technology to 23,000 sugar cane growers. He also carried out research on the extent of climate change and its impact on sugar cane production and the loss of soil and nutrients from the undulating cane areas due to erosion and surface run off. He has been a member of Fiji Institute of Technology and a member of International Society for Sugar Technologist.

In March 2005, he chaired a workshop on "Raising Awareness on Linking Climate Forecasting and Decision Making Practices for the Fiji Sugar Industry".

== Political involvement ==
In the 2006 general election, he was the Fiji Labour Party candidate for the Lautoka City Indian Communal Constituency, previously held by Ganesh Chand and he won easily by getting 80% of the votes cast.

== CEO of Sugar Cane Growers Council ==
On 31 March 2007, he was appointed the chief executive officer of the Fiji Sugar Cane Growers Council, replacing Jagannath Sami who was sacked in January for alleged mismanagement.
