= S. B. Patel =

Fijian lawyer

Shivabhai Bhailalbhai Patel, commonly known as S.B. Patel, was a London trained barrister, who arrived in Fiji, from India, on 24 December 1927. He was a man of calm and philosophical nature and had considerable influence on Fiji politics, always working behind the scenes. Even the Government of Fiji used him as a channel of communication with Fiji Indian leadership.

He was born in the Kheda district of Gujarat in India and had worked with Gandhi when he initiated satyagraha in Kaira District, in 1918, to secure suspension of revenue assessment on failure of crops, then went to Rangoon and London. His decision to come to Fiji was the result of Dr Hamilton Beattie's correspondence with Henry S. L. Polak regarding the problems of the Fiji Indians. Polak suggested that Patel go to Fiji to practise law and help organise the Indian community. He was reluctant at first, but at Gandhi's urging agreed to come to Fiji. While studying in London he met A. D. Patel and is credited with being responsible for getting him to come to Fiji.

On his arrival in Fiji, he had first-hand experience with the division among Fiji Indians when he was welcomed by two rival groups at Suva wharf, one led by Beattie and the other by Vishnu Deo. It was the mediation of S.B. Patel which led to the merger of the two rival organisations, each called Fiji Indian National Congress, to form a single national organisation in 1929.

He, together with A.D. Patel and Vishnu Deo planned tactics which led to Vishnu Deo moving a motion calling for common roll. S.B. Patel was actually present in the public gallery as Vishnu Deo moved the historic motion. After the walkout by Indian members, the Governor convened a meeting of Indian leaders and S.B. Patel was one of the delegates. In 1934, when the fight for common roll was being conducted from outside the Legislative Council, S.B. Patel chaired meetings called by the umbrella organisation, the Indian Association of Fiji.

During the 1943 sugar cane strike, it was through S.B. Patel, that a meeting was arranged between the Government and the Maha Sangh. When negotiations started for the 1950 cane contract, it was S.B. Patel who persuaded the five farmers' unions to work together. In 1976, when the National Federation Party (NFP) was hopelessly divided, it was again S.B. Patel who managed to get the two sides to patch up their differences and fight the March 1977 election as a united party. The NFP won this election.

== See also ==
- Gujaratis in Fiji
- National Federation Party
