= Sadhu Kuppuswami =

Sadhu Kuppuswami (1890–1956) was a Fiji Indian religious leader.

He was awarded the title "Sevaka Ratnam" in 1941

== Early life ==
Kuppuswami, the son of Govind Swamy Naidu, was born in the village of Konoor, Tamil Nadu, India in 1890. He was literate in Tamil and Telugu and was a police officer in India. He arrived in Fiji on 27 April 1912 as an indentured labourer, abroad the Sutlej III. He served his five years of indenture in Tavua. He then tried cane farming but soon gave it up to join the Melbourne Trust Company in Rakiraki as a two-horse ploughman. His father, an Orthodox South Indian, ensured that his son was given the best to develop his knowledge of South-Indian religion, culture and art in his mother tongue Tamil from a young age.

== Formation of South Indian Organisation ==
At Rakiraki, he met T.A.J. Pillai, a court clerk, and stayed with his family while teaching Tamil to local children. During the influenza epidemic of 1918, Sadhu Swami did a lot of relief work by transporting the sick to hospital. He was also impressed with efforts by Vashist Muni to improve the plight of Fiji Indian farmers and workers. On 10 January 1926, while celebrating the birth of Swami Vivekananda in Rakiraki, attended by people of all districts, the idea of forming a South Indian organisation was proposed. On 24 May 1926, at a meeting in Nadi, the Then India Sanmargya Ikya Sangam (TISI Sangam) was formed with Kuppuswami as its first President.

== Propagating his Mission ==
After the formation of the Sangam, Kuppuswami and others travelled throughout Fiji, setting up schools and temples. Aware of the need for qualified help in establishing the Sangam in Fiji, he appealed to the Ramakrishna Mission in India who sent Swami Avinashananda to reorganise the Sangam. Swami Avinashananda was replaced by Swami Rudrananda who had great influence in Fiji's religious, cane farming and political activities.

== Everlasting Honour ==
After many years of dedicated service, Kuppuswami was honoured with the title of Sevaka Rathnam (Jewel of Service) in 1941 by the TISI Sangam. He died suddenly on 2 August 1956. His remains were interred at the Sri Siva Subramaniya temple in Nadi.

== See also ==
- South Indians in Fiji
