= Queensland Institute of Business and Technology =

Griffith College (Formerly QIBT)
- Affiliations: Griffith University, Navitas
- Location: Australia; 27°32′28″S 153°03′55″E; 27.965698°S 153.381028°E
- Campus: Mount Gravatt and Gold Coast
- Website: https://www.griffith.edu.au/college

Griffith College is a higher education institution and pathway college, located on Griffith University's Mount Gravatt and Gold Coast campuses. Griffith College delivers higher education programs as a registered Higher Education Provider with the Commonwealth Government's Tertiary Education Quality and Standards Agency. Griffith College is registered on the Commonwealth Register of Institutions and Courses for Overseas Students as required by the Education Services for Overseas Students (ESOS) Act 2000. In December 2015 Griffith College rebranded from Queensland Institute of Business and Technology to Griffith College to reflect its role as a pathway college to Griffith University.

Griffith College has been in partnership with Griffith University since 1997 and has taught more than 14,000 students since then.

== Programs ==
The school provides university level Diploma programs in the areas of Science, Commerce, Criminology & Criminal Justice, Engineering, Design, Hotel Management, Social and Psychological Science and Information Technology. The Diploma programs mirror the first year of a selection of bachelor's degrees at Griffith University allowing students to gain entry to Year 2 of the Bachelor upon successful completion of their Diploma. It also delivers a Foundation Program and associate degree in Commerce and Business. These programs are offered in partnership with Griffith University, and are recognised by many other universities in Australia for entry with advanced standing.
