= Krishna Reddy =

Krishna Reddy or Krishnareddy may refer to:

- Bojjala Gopala Krishna Reddy (born 1949), Srikalahasti MLA in 1994, 1999 and 2009
- Krishna Reddy (artist) (1925-2018), Indian printmaker and sculptor
- Krishna S. Reddy (1916–), Fiji Indian school teacher and member of the Legislative Council
- S. V. Krishna Reddy (born 1966), Indian film director
- Vishal Krishna Reddy (born 1977), Indian film actor
