= Muhammad Faiz =

Muhammad Faiz may refer to:

- Muhammad Faiz (footballer), Indonesian footballer
- Mohammad Faiz, Indian singer

== See also ==
- Faiz Mohammad (disambiguation)
