= Griffith University =

Public research university in Brisbane, Australia

Coordinates: 27.5526°S 153.0539°E

- Motto: Make it matter
- Type: Public research university
- Established: 30 December 1971; 54 years ago
- Accreditation: TEQSA
- Academic affiliations: Utrecht Network (AEN); Innovative Research Universities (IRU); ACU; CILECT; OUA
- Budget: A$1.16 billion (2023)
- Chancellor: Andrew Fraser
- Vice-Chancellor: Jessica Vanderlelie
- Total staff: 4,642 (FTE, 2023)
- Students: 44,427 (2023)
- Undergraduates: 30,924 bachelor (2023)
- Postgraduates: 8,442 coursework (2023); 1,931 research (2023); 2,104 other (2023)
- Other students: 1,026 (2023)
- Location: Gold Coast, Logan and Brisbane, Queensland, Australia
- Campus: Urban, parkland and regional with multiple sites
- Named after: Samuel Griffith
- Colours: Red
- Sporting affiliations: UniSport; EAEN
- Website: griffith.edu.au

Griffith University is a public research university in South East Queensland, Australia. The university was founded in 1971 and officially opened in 1975. The university has five campuses, at Gold Coast, Nathan, Logan, South Bank, and Mount Gravatt. A sixth campus, to be located at the Treasury Building in the Brisbane CBD, will open in 2027. The university was named in honour of Sir Samuel Walker Griffith, who was twice Premier of Queensland and the first Chief Justice of the High Court of Australia.

The university offers undergraduate, postgraduate, and research programs across a range of disciplines, including business, law, science, health, education, engineering, and the arts.

Griffith University was originally opened in Nathan, Queensland, as a single campus of 451 students, but has expanded to include five campuses in three cities, the largest of which is the Gold Coast campus at Southport and the Nathan campus in Brisbane. The Mount Gravatt and South Bank campuses are also located in Brisbane, while the Logan campus is at Meadowbrook.

Griffith University is a verdant university and a member of the IRU.

== History ==
=== Beginning ===
In 1965, 174 hectares (430 acres) of natural bushland at Nathan was set aside for a new university campus. Initially, the site was to be part of the University of Queensland, which was experiencing strong demand in humanities and social sciences. By 1970, a new tertiary institution was being mooted, and Theodor Bray (later Sir Theodor Bray) was asked by the Queensland Government to establish a second for Brisbane and the third for the state.

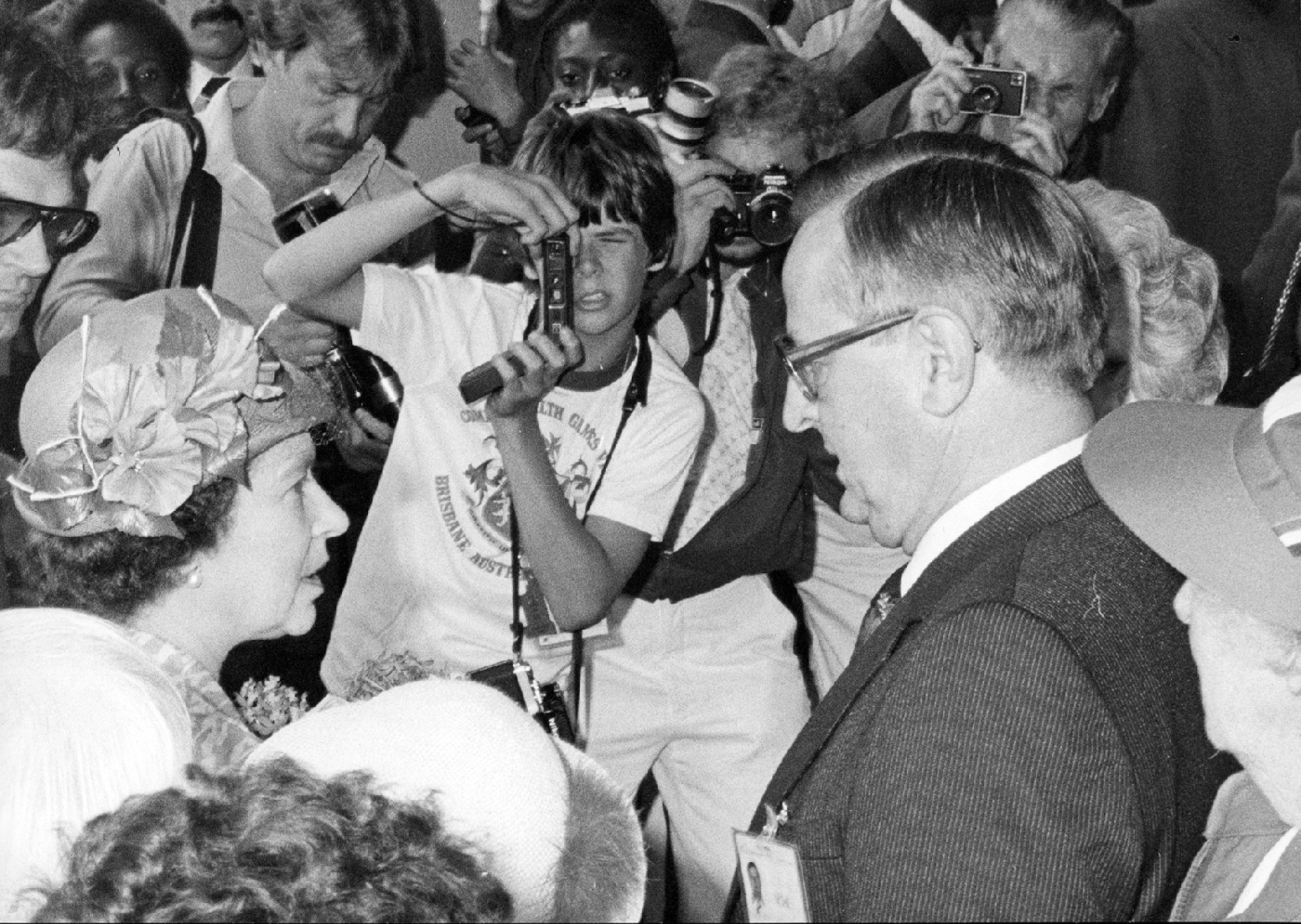
Queen Elizabeth II in conversation with Vice Chancellor Professor John Willett at the Games Village (Nathan campus), 1982.

Coat of arms of the university historically used on testamurs and official documents

After several months of discussion, the government announced on 24 December 1970 that Bray would head a committee charged with establishing Griffith University.

In 1982, Queen Elizabeth II visited the Nathan campus during the Commonwealth Games and met with the university's Vice Chancellor, Professor John Willett, at the Games Village.

On 30 September 1971, the Queensland Government officially created and recognised Griffith University with the passing of the Assent to Griffith University Act 1971. On 5 March 1975, Griffith University began teaching 451 students in four schools: Australian Environmental Studies, Humanities, Modern Asian Studies, and Science.

=== Expansion ===
In the 1990s, the Dawkins Revolution saw several tertiary education reforms in Australia, resulting in a series of amalgamations of colleges and universities. In 1990, the Mount Gravatt Teachers College (est. 1969) and Gold Coast College of Advanced Education (est. 1987) became official campuses of Griffith University, remaining in the same location today. The Queensland Conservatorium of Music continued the higher education mergers and became an official part of Griffith University in 1991. Originally established in 1957, the new entity became known as Queensland Conservatorium Griffith University. In 1992, Griffith's amalgamations were completed with the Queensland College of Art (QCA), established in 1881 and recognised as the oldest continuously operating art training institution in Australia, officially becoming part of the university.

Griffith's fifth campus, Logan, opened in 1998. Located in the suburb of Meadowbrook, on an area of green fields south of Brisbane, the Logan campus was established to specifically address the interests and needs of the Logan City area.

Griffith University was an official Partner of the Gold Coast 2018 Commonwealth Games. Over 500 students and staff were closely involved in the planning and delivery of the event.

== Campuses ==
Griffith University's campuses are distinctive for their nature-based settings within urban environments.

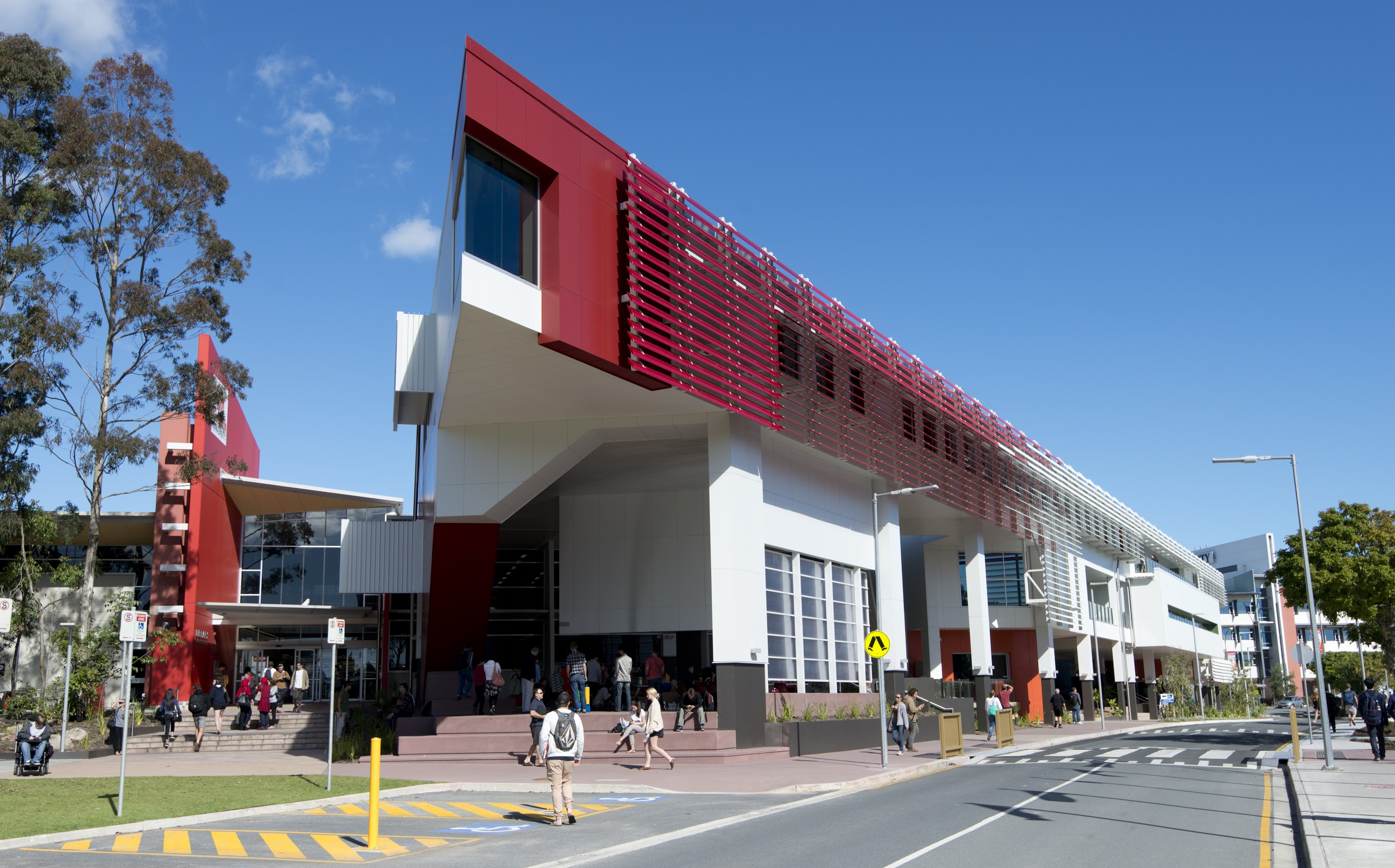
Library at the Griffith University Gold Coast campus.

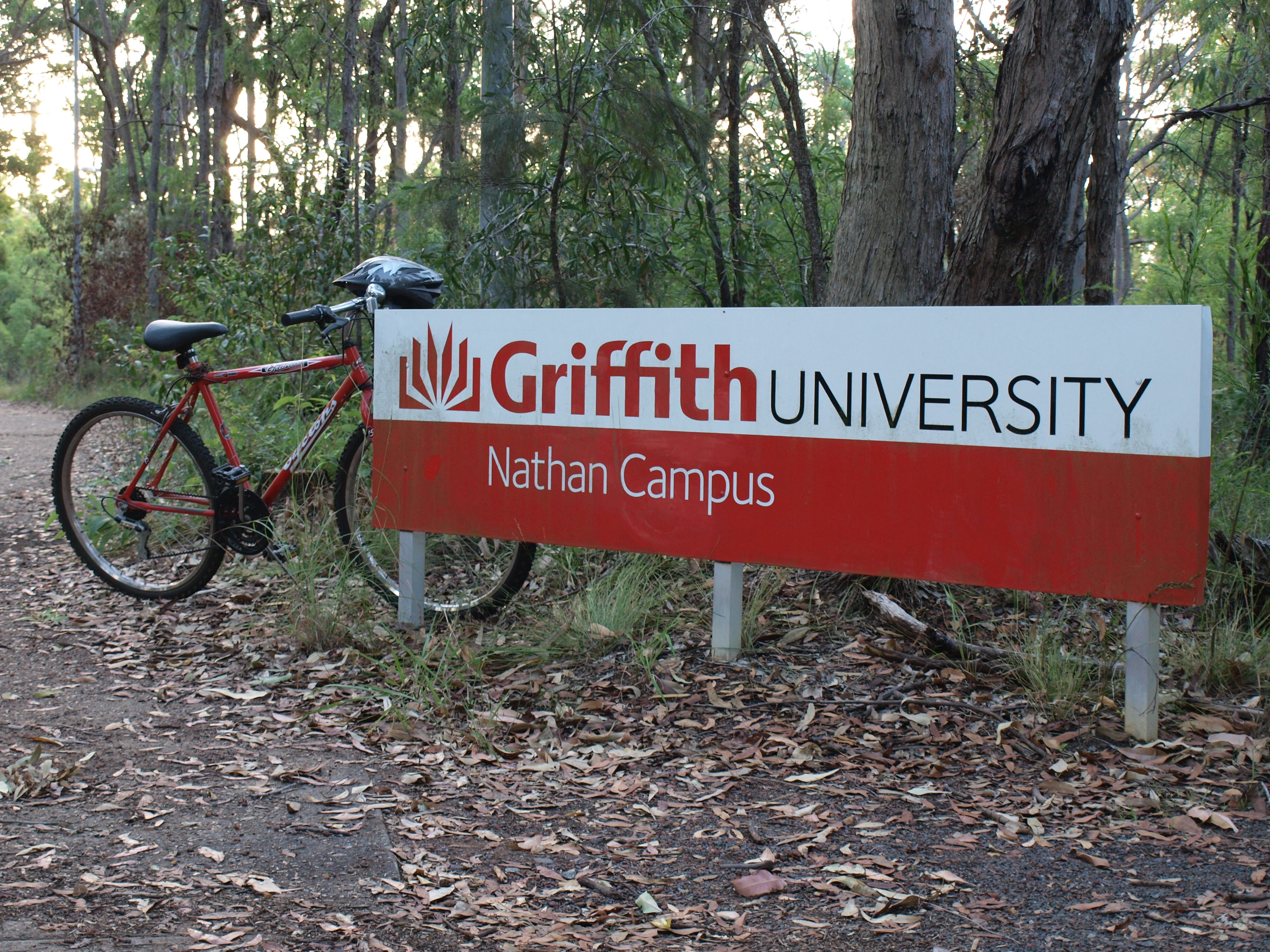
Griffith University (Nathan campus) from Stadium Path

=== Gold Coast campus ===
The Gold Coast campus is located in the Gold Coast suburb of Southport. Set in native bushland, on the land of the Aboriginal Yugambeh and Kombumerri peoples, this campus hosts over 19,000 students.

The campus opened the Griffith Health Centre and the neighbouring Gold Coast University Hospital in 2013, and opened the Griffith Business School building in 2014. The campus is serviced by two Gold Coast light rail (G:link) stations and is a major interchange for bus routes.

=== Logan campus ===
Hosting approximately 2,000 students, Logan campus offers degrees in human services and social work, nursing and midwifery, business, and education.

=== Nathan campus ===
Nathan, Griffith's foundation campus, is situated on the edge of Toohey Forest approximately 10 kilometres from the Brisbane CBD. Nathan hosts over 13,000 students and offers degrees in business and government, engineering and information technology, environment, humanities and languages, law, and science and aviation.

The buildings at the Nathan campus were designed to fit into the environment by Roger Kirk Johnson, the founding architectural designer of the campus, following the slope of the land and using architectural means of cooling. The library building was designed by Robin Gibson and won the first national award for library design. The clusters of buildings, sports facilities, bushland reserves, and recreational areas are connected by integrated networks of walking paths. On the northern edge of the campus lies the Dunn Memorial.

In 2013, Sir Samuel Griffith Centre was opened on the Nathan campus. The building operates off the grid and is powered by a combination of photovoltaics and hydrogen. The campus has two residential colleges for students and a range of sporting facilities.

=== Mount Gravatt campus ===
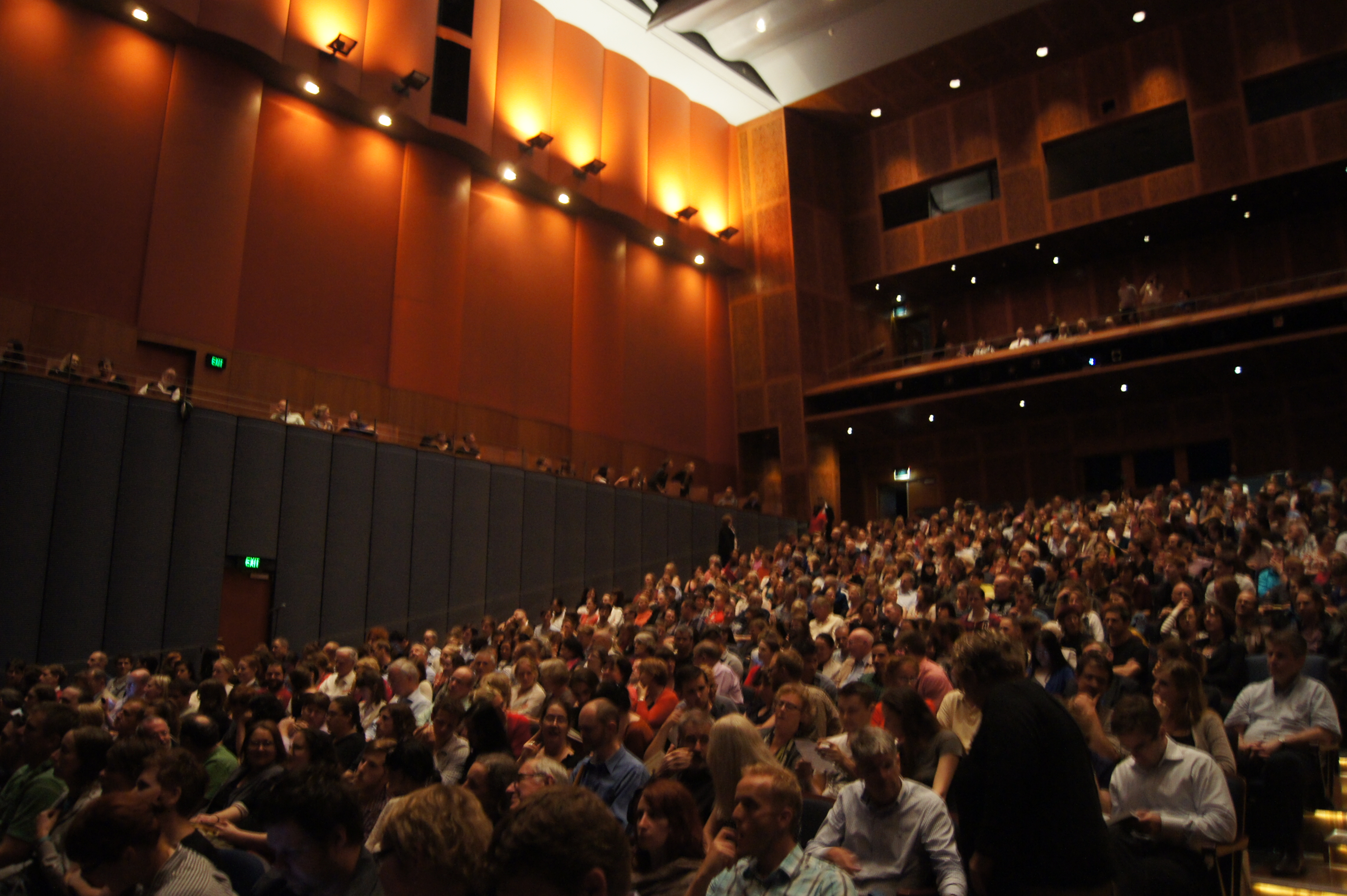
Queensland Conservatorium of Music

The Mount Gravatt campus, adjacent to the Nathan campus, hosts 4,400 students. It is the university's social sciences and humanities hub and the base for research into crucial social issues, including education and suicide prevention. The campus is situated on the edge of Toohey Forest. The campus includes an aquatic and fitness centre, with a heated pool and indoor and outdoor recreation areas, co-located with a 16-court tennis centre, a training oval, and basketball and netball courts. On-campus student accommodation is also available.

Griffith University intends to leave the Mount Gravatt campus by the end of 2026.

=== South Bank campus ===
Located in Brisbane's cultural precinct, the South Bank campus is Griffith University's creative hub. It encompasses Griffith's Queensland College of Art and Queensland Conservatorium, the Griffith Film School and the Griffith University Art Museum and Ship Inn. As of 2020, enrolment for all four units is about 3,400 students.

=== Future Brisbane City campus ===
On 6 September 2024, Griffith University announced that they would be purchasing the historic Treasury Building in Brisbane, and converting it into the university's sixth teaching campus, which will open in 2027. The new campus will accommodate students and staff from the Schools of Business, IT and Law, and will also serve as a centre for “postgraduate and executive education”.

== Organisation ==
Griffith University is structured in four academic groups, with teaching offered through a range of schools, colleges, and departments.

=== Arts, Education, and Law ===
- School of Criminology and Criminal Justice
- School of Education and Professional Studies
- School of Humanities, Languages and Social Science
- Griffith Law School
- Queensland College of Art
- Griffith Film School
- Queensland Conservatorium

=== Griffith Business School ===
- Department of Accounting, Finance and Economics
- Department of Management
- Department of Tourism and Marketing
- School of Government and International Relations

=== Griffith Health ===
- School of Applied Psychology
- School of Health Sciences and Social Work
- School of Medicine and Dentistry
- School of Nursing and Midwifery
- School of Pharmacy and Medical Sciences

=== Griffith Sciences ===
- School of Engineering and Built Environment
- School of Environment and Science
- School of Information and Communication Technology

== Academic profile ==
=== Research ===
Griffith researchers work in 38 centres and institutes, investigating areas such as water science, climate change adaptation, criminology and crime prevention, sustainable tourism, and health and chronic disease.

The university's major research institutes include:

- Advanced Design and Prototyping Technologies Institute (ADaPT)
- Australian Rivers Institute
- Cities Research Institute
- Environmental Futures Research Institute
- Griffith Asia Institute
- Griffith Criminology Institute
- Griffith Institute for Educational Research
- Griffith Institute for Tourism
- Institute for Glycomics
- Institute for Integrated and Intelligent Systems
- Menzies Health Institute Queensland (formerly the Griffith Health Institute)
- Griffith Institute for Drug Discovery (GRIDD)
- Queensland Quantum and Advanced Technologies Institute (QUATRI)

Additionally, Griffith hosts several externally supported centres and facilities, including:

- Australian Institute for Suicide Research and Prevention
- National Climate Change Adaptation Research Facility
- Smart Water Research Centre
- NHMRC Centre of Research Excellence in Nursing

==== Research commercialization ====
Griffith offers research commercialization and services for business, industry, and government through Griffith Enterprise.

==== Other centres ====
As well as research centres and institutes, Griffith has several cultural and community-focused organizations. These include the EcoCentre, which provides a space for environmental education activities, exhibitions, seminars, and workshops; and the Centre for Interfaith & Cultural Dialogue (formerly the Multi-Faith Centre).

==== Recognised research ====
In 2021, a research team led by the university discovered a new type of tree frog in New Guinea which is commonly known as the "chocolate frog".

=== Academic reputation ===
University rankings

Global – Overall
- ARWU World: 301–400 (2025)
- CWTS World: 289 (Note: The CWTS Leiden Ranking is based on P (top 10%).) (2024)
- QS World: 230 (2027)
- QS Employability: 301–500 (2022)
- THE World: 251–300 (2026)
- USNWR Global: 238 (25/26)

National – Overall
- ARWU National: 14–20 (2026)
- CWTS National: 13 (2024)
- ERA National: =12 (2018)
- QS National: 18 (2026)
- THE National: 14–20 (2026)
- USNWR National: 16 (25/26)
- AFR National: =19 (2025)

In the 2024 Aggregate Ranking of Top Universities, which measures aggregate performance across the QS, THE and ARWU rankings, the university attained a position of #236 (17th nationally).

National publications

In the Australian Financial Review Best Universities Ranking 2025, the university was tied #19 amongst Australian universities.

Global publications

In the 2026 Quacquarelli Symonds World University Rankings (published 2025), the university attained a position of #268 (18th nationally).

In the Times Higher Education World University Rankings 2026 (published 2025), the university attained a position of #251–300 (tied 14–20th nationally).

In the 2025 Academic Ranking of World Universities, the university attained a position of #301–400 (tied 14–20th nationally).

In the 2025–2026 U.S. News & World Report Best Global Universities, the university attained a position of #238 (16th nationally).

In the CWTS Leiden Ranking 2024, the university attained a position of #289 (13th nationally).

=== Student outcomes ===
The Australian Government's QILT (Note: Abbreviation for Quality Indicators for Learning and Teaching.) conducts national surveys documenting the student life cycle from enrolment through to employment. These surveys place more emphasis on criteria such as student experience, graduate outcomes and employer satisfaction than perceived reputation, research output and citation counts.

In the 2023 Employer Satisfaction Survey, graduates of the university had an overall employer satisfaction rate of 80.1%.

In the 2023 Graduate Outcomes Survey, graduates of the university had a full-time employment rate of 73.9% for undergraduates and 89.1% for postgraduates. The initial full-time salary was A$70,000 for undergraduates and A$95,000 for postgraduates.

In the 2023 Student Experience Survey, undergraduates at the university rated the quality of their entire educational experience at 80.2% meanwhile postgraduates rated their overall education experience at 78.8%.

== Student life ==
=== Student organisations ===
==== Nathan, Logan, Southbank, and Mt Gravatt ====
Griffith University has a wide array of cultural, intellectual, sporting, and social groups. On the Nathan campus, Campus Life supports many clubs and societies including political and religious affiliated organisations. The Griffith University Student Representative Council (GUSRC) represents undergraduate students and the Griffith University Postgraduate Students Association (GUPSA) represents post-graduate students in all campuses apart from the Gold Coast. GUPSA is a constituent member of the Council of Australian Postgraduate Associations.

==== Gold Coast ====
The students of the Gold Coast campus are uniquely represented by board members of the Student Guild, as defined by the Griffith University Act 1998, and Student Guild staff manages clubs and societies on the Gold Coast campus, as well as student issues related to academic and student advocacy, financial and legal issues, wellbeing, and welfare. The Student Guild Board is an elected group of students that represent all Gold Coast students, while the Gold Coast Association of Postgraduates (GCAP) represents postgraduate students. The Student Guild receives SSAF funding from Griffith University to support the management and provision of services and funding to student-led clubs and societies.

=== Student Academy of Excellence ===
The Student Academy of Excellence, formerly Griffith Honours College, offers high-achieving students potential opportunities to enrich their university experience through mentoring, international experiences, leadership roles, and community engagement activities.

=== Griffith Sports College ===
Students who are elite athletes are eligible to join Griffith Sports College, which provides support by helping them balance sporting and university commitments. The Griffith Sports College supports elite athletes to achieve sporting and academic excellence. Distinguished alumni spans 82 Olympians, 13 Paralympians and many Commonwealth Games athletes, including Emma McKeon, Madison de Rozario, Cameron McEvoy, and Ashleigh Gentle.

=== UniSport Nationals ===
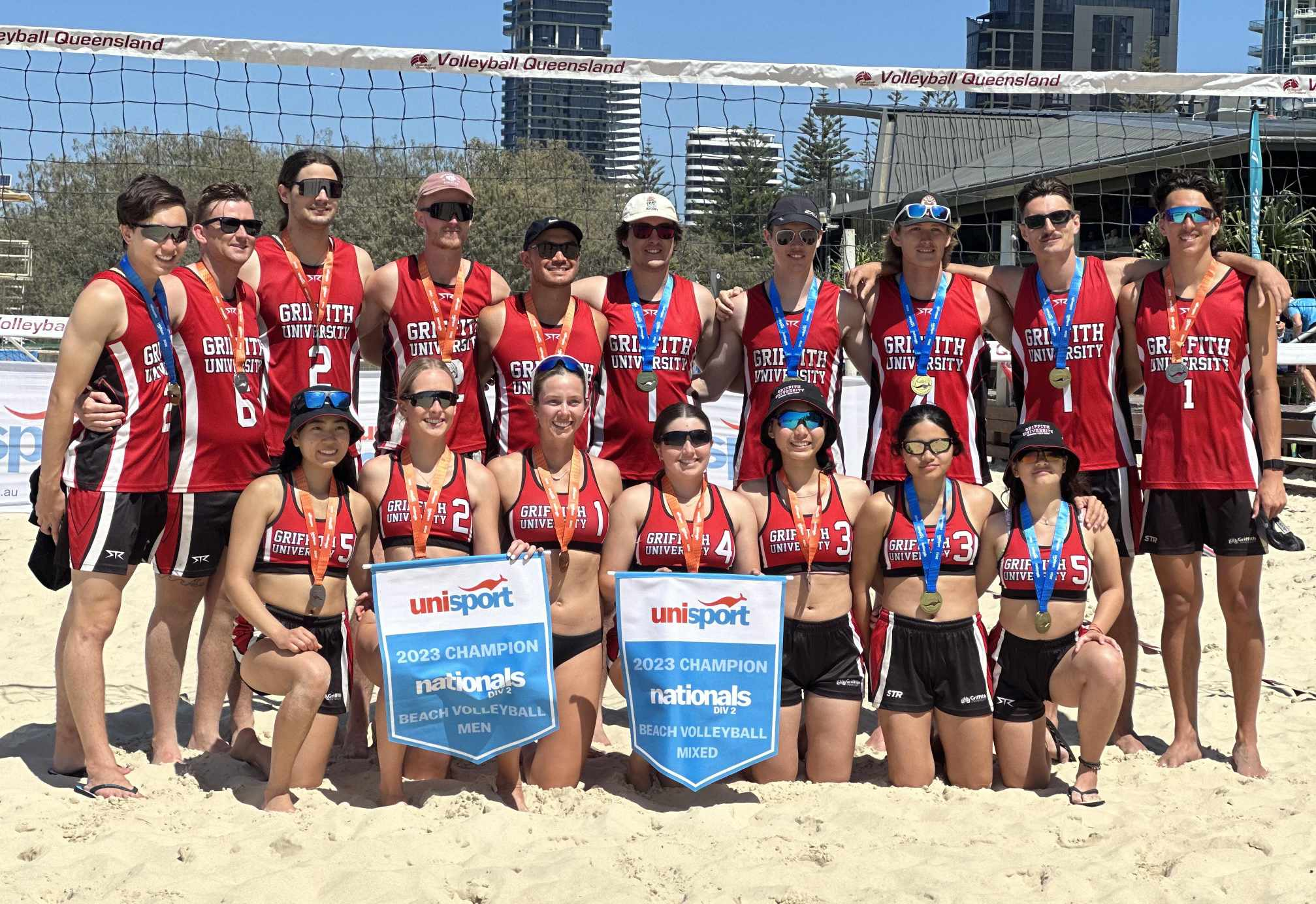
Griffith University's Beach Volleyball Team at the UniSport Nationals 2023 held on the Gold Coast, Queensland.

Griffith University competes in Australia's largest annual multi-sport event hosts 42 member universities that compete against each other in 31 different sports. Griffith Sport supports Griffith Team Leaders to assist in the coordination and management of their respective sports teams. Sporting clubs are vital conduits for fostering and facilitating participation in national-level competitions such as UniSport Nationals.

=== GUMURRII Student Support Unit ===
The GUMURRII Student Support Unit (SSU) is the heart of Griffith's Aboriginal and Torres Strait Islander community and is located on each of Griffith's five campuses. GUMURRII is a dedicated Student Support Unit for Aboriginal and Torres Strait Islander students. Aboriginal and Torres Strait Islander staff assist students from recruitment to orientation, providing undergraduate and postgraduate support through to graduation.

=== Griffith College ===
Located on Griffith University's Mount Gravatt and Gold Coast campuses, Griffith College, formerly the Queensland Institute of Business and Technology, offers undergraduate diplomas in a range of areas, which provide a pathway into many of Griffith's degree programs.

=== Griffith English Language Institute ===
Students from non-English-speaking backgrounds can study English at the Griffith English Language Institute (GELI). A wide range of English language courses is available to help students improve their English for work, travel, study, or everyday purposes.

=== Residential colleges ===
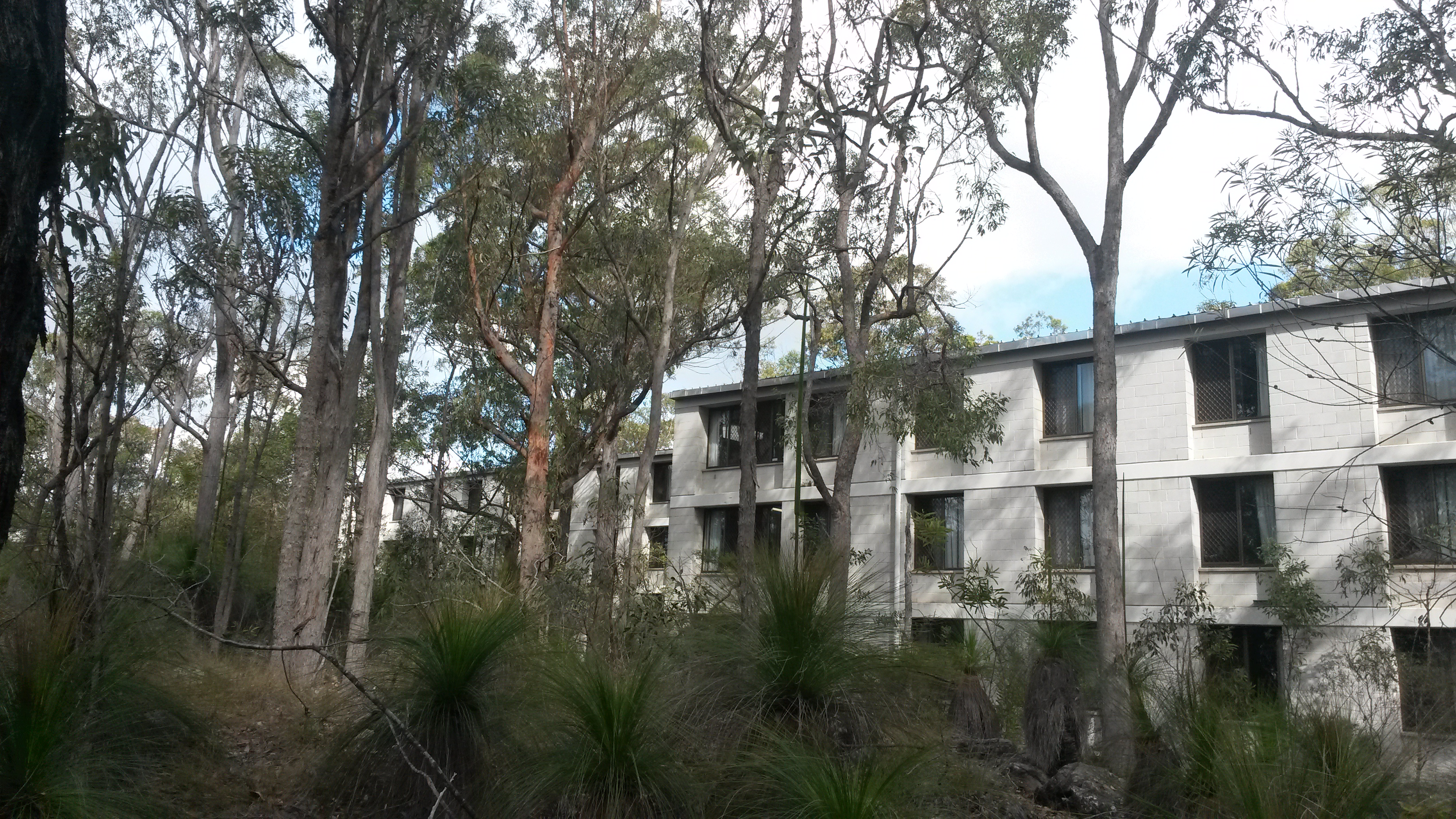
Kinaba, KGBC colleges, Griffith University Nathan campus

Griffith University has four residential colleges, with two located on its Nathan campus and one each on its Mt Gravatt and Gold Coast campuses. The three colleges located in Brisbane compete in the sporting Inter-College Cup, also known as the ICC. The premier event of the ICC is the Phar Cup, where both female and male teams compete in rugby league matches against each other. The colleges are as follows:

- Bellenden Ker College, a.k.a. BK, is a co-educational college located on the Nathan Campus in the Toohey forest reserve.
- KGBC, also known as "The Flats", consist of four co-educational undergraduate and postgraduate apartments on the Nathan Campus.
- Mt Gravatt College, a.k.a. MG, is a co-educational college located on the Mt Gravatt Campus which itself sits on the hill for which the surrounding suburbs are named.
- Griffith University Village is a collection of co-ed apartments on the Gold Coast Campus.

=== Safe Campuses initiative ===
Between 2011 and 2016, there were 46 officially reported cases of sexual abuse and harassment on campus released by the university, resulting in no expulsions and one six-month suspension, the highest reported stats in Queensland at the time. This was fewer than the 2017 Australian Human Rights Commission report on sexual assault and harassment, which found reported figures higher than this.

Following the release of the report, Griffith University established the Safe Campuses Taskforce. The Taskforce and its working parties are working to ensure Griffith's campuses provide safe, inclusive and respectful environments for all students and staff.

== Alumni ==
Griffith University has over 300,000 alumni. Notable graduates have been journalists, musicians, actors, artists, filmmakers, photographers, athletes, activists, and politicians in the Parliament of Australia and the Parliament of Queensland.

== See also ==
- List of universities in Australia
