= Mehar Singh =

Fijian trade unionist

Padri Mehar Singh was one of the founding members of Fiji's Kisan Sangh when it was established in 1937. He remained a prominent member of the union until 1943, when he and Ramcharan Singh led a faction that supported a strike instigated by the rival union, Maha Sangh, led by A. D. Patel. While most of his supporters rejoined the Kisan Sangh led by Ayodhya Prasad in 1946, Mehar Singh and his remaining supporters, mainly Sikhs, formed the Vishal Sangh. This union with a small support base remained a junior partner to the Maha Sangh from then on.
