= Southern Division Kisan Sangh =

The Southern Division Kisan Sangh was formed in Fiji in 1946 by a former member of parliament, K. B. Singh, due to personal differences with the president of the Rewa Planters Union, Ram Krishna Chaudhary. There was widespread opposition to this until Vishnu Deo took over its leadership and worked together with Ram Krishna Chaudhary and his union.

In 1948, Vishnu Deo and A. D. Patel parted ways after having worked together since 1929 and this affected the sugarcane industry as Vishnu Deo aligned himself with Ayodhya Prasad and the Kisan Sangh and was opposed to A.D. Patel's Maha Sangh.

The Southern Division Kisan Sangh took an active role in the negotiations for the 1950 cane contract. Vishnu Deo's union and Ayodhya Prasad's Kisan Sangh opposed the contract as presented by the Colonial Sugar Refining Company, while A.D. Patel's Maha Sangh supported it.

With the closure of the Nausori sugar mill in 1959, the union ceased to exist.

== See also ==
- Sugar Cane farmers unions in Fiji
