= Sugar Cane Growers Council =

Sugar Cane Growers Council represents the sugar cane farmers in Fiji. It is made up of 38 members elected by the farmers and eight members nominated by the government. The Sugar Cane Growers Council election is held every three years. The Council has a chief executive, the first one being Vijay R. Singh, and a chairman.

In elections held in March 1992 the National Farmers Union won 33 of the 38 Council seats. In the 1998 elections, the National Farmers Union won 22 seats. In 2001, the National Farmers Union won 21 seats while the Fiji Cane Growers Association won 16 seats and one seat went to an independent. The National Farmers Union retained its majority in 2004, winning 22 of the 38 seats contested, the Fiji Cane Growers Association won fourteen seats, and the remaining two seats went to independent candidates. The National Farmers Union polled 52 per cent of all votes cast compared to the Fiji Cane Growers Association's 42 percent. The eight members nominated by the government and the two independent candidates hold the balance of power. Since the National Farmers Union is supported by the Government Party's main rival, the Fiji Labour Party, government appointees to the Council have always been rivals of the National Farmers Union.

On 27 December 2006, military commander Commodore Voreqe Bainimarama, who had taken power in a military coup on 5 December, suspended Jagannath Sami, the chief executive, the council, and Chairman Vijendra Autar, citing abuse of office, misuse of funds, irregularities in the elections of the Board of Directors and $80,000 growers' funds being used without proper approval by board members who went on a recent trip to India. Commodore Bainimarama also revoked the appointment of eight council members by the deposed government of Laisenia Qarase.

On 31 March 2007, former Fiji Labour Party parliamentarian Jai Gawander was appointed as the new chief executive officer of the Council. The General Secretary of the Fiji Cane Growers Association, Bala Dass questioned why all the Fiji Labour Party members were being elected to run the affairs of the Sugar Cane Growers Council board. Dass said that the appointment was contrary to what the Interim Government was preaching.

== List of chief executives ==
- Vijay R. Singh (1985–1987)
- Grish Maharaj (1987–2000)
- Jagannath Sami (2000–2006)
- Jai Gawander (2007–2009)
- Sundresh Chetty (2009–present)
