= Jagannath Sami =

Fijian footballer

Jagannath Sami has been a soccer player representing a premier district side in the Fiji Football Association competitions, a leader of the sugar mill workers, a leader of a farmers' union, a politician and chief executive officer of the Sugar Cane Growers Council but he is best known for the controversy surrounding his dismissal as the CEO of the SCGC by the military regime of Commodore Josaia Voreqe (Frank) Bainimarama following the military coup of 2006.

== Soccer player, coach and manager ==
Sami became known nationally as a soccer player when he, together with three of his brothers (known as the Sami brothers), helped lift his home soccer district team of Labasa from a struggling first division side to a serious contender for the Fiji Football Association competitions in the premier division, in the 1970s. Jagannath Sami's soccer career started when he first represented the Lautoka soccer team in 1972, playing his first game in that year's Pala Cup against Suva. The following year he represented the Nadogo Soccer Association, a second division district team from Vanua Levu, as player/coach and helped the team win the second division Inter District Soccer Trophy for the first time. From 1974 until 1979 Jagannath represented the Labasa soccer side with his brothers Anand, Gopal and Abhilasha. Jagannath represented the Fiji National side with brother Anand in 1976. He was awarded the Jamnadas Gold Trophy that year as the best right winger in Fiji. In 1980, he was elected the manager of the Labasa Soccer Side and the following year he was elected chairman of the board of Control. In 1981 Sami was elected the president of the Labasa Soccer Association becoming the youngest of a Premier Division in Fiji.

== Union activities ==
As an employee of the Fiji Sugar Corporation, Sami rose through the ranks to become the National President of the 250 management staff union, the Sugar Milling Staff Officers Association. He was also elected vice-president of the Fiji Trades Union Congress to represent the sugar sector. He began his involvement in sugar cane growers politics as the general secretary of the Fiji Cane Growers Association. He assisted the cane lorry drivers during its 5-day strike, in addressing their grievances with the Lautoka Mill Management, for better facilities and amenities at the mill yard. He subsequently facilitated the registration of the Fiji Cane Transport Operator's Association and was elected its first general secretary. He also assisted in the formation and registration of the South Pacific Distillery Worker's Association and the Lautoka Fishermens' Association.

== Political candidacy ==
In the 1994 Parliamentary elections he contested a Vuda Indian Communal seat for the National Federation Party but lost to his Fiji Labour Party opponent. He was similarly defeated in the 1999 elections, contesting the Lautoka Communal Seat.

== CEO of Sugar Cane Growers Council ==
Jagannath Sami was appointed to as the chief executive of the Sugar Cane Growers Council of Fiji in 2000. He owed appointment to the 16 Fiji Cane Growers Association (FCGA) and the 8 Government appointed members who together formed a majority in the council. (The National Farmers Union (NFU) had 21 members).

He used unconventional methods to assist farmers by directly approaching the Great Council of Chiefs, taking a delegation of the Cane Growers Council and made submissions to help solve the country's land lease problems, claiming that political leaders had politicised the land issue and could not resolve the problem.

== Dismissal from Growers Council ==
=== Suspension ===
Sami was suspended from Growers Council on 27 December 2006 by Commodore Josaia Voreqe (Frank) Bainimarama, the Commander of the Republic of Fiji Military Forces and Acting President of Fiji. Bainimarama alleged that Sami had manipulated the council's operations to serve certain political and personal agendas. Earlier he had questioned the acting Police Commissioner on his statement that rule of law was still intact in the country and had been warned by the military to not make any comments against it.

After his appointment as Chief Executive he faced constant opposition from the other farmers' union, the National Farmers Union (NFU) so it came as no surprise when the NFU supported his suspension.

=== Legal controversy ===
Sami responded to his suspension by announcing that he was going to sue the Military Commander and the attorney general. He filed his legal challenge on 16 January 2007, in the Lautoka High Court, which ordered his reinstatement the next day. When he attempted to enter his office after the verdict handed down by Justice John Connors, however, his staff informed him that Military personnel had instructed them to prevent him from entering the premises. This was directly contrary to the court ruling.

In response to the verdict, Interim Attorney-General Aiyaz Sayed-Khaiyum said that Justice Connors must have been uninformed about Sami's formal dismissal, the day before by the president of the Republic of Fiji. He reported that No sealed copy of the order had been served in his office, Khaiyum said. He said that the government would "honour" the court order "when served", and that the judge would be "formally informed" when the matter returned to court on 23 January. President Ratu Josefa Iloilo had signed the Promulgation (Decree No. 1) terminating Sami's contract, Khaiyum said the next day.

=== Attempted return to work ===
On the basis of the court verdict, Sami attempted to return to work, accompanied by a police escort, on 18 January. Military personnel surrounded the premises that morning and took Sami away for interrogation at the Police Western Division Headquarters. He was later admitted to the coronary care unit of Lautoka Hospital after complaining of chest pains. Sources said he showed no sign of physical injury, but appeared psychologically traumatised.

On 26 January 2007, Justice John Connors ordered the Military to stop harassing Sami, warning that any interference with him could compromise any legal proceedings that he was a party to.

=== Hiding ===
Director of Immigration Viliame Naupoto announced on 25 January that Sami had been banned from leaving Fiji. Two days later, Sami went into hiding, following alleged threats against him and his family. His lawyer, Shalend Krishna, also alleged that harassment and intimidation from the Military had prevented him from obtaining the necessary decree from the Government Printery to file court pleas on Sami's behalf.

=== Latest developments ===
The SCGC finalised Sami's termination at the first meeting of the new 11-member board on 1 February 2007, and resolved to appoint a three-member team to investigate all council business during Sami's tenure, including allegations that he had misused council funds to finance a lawsuit challenging his suspension.

On the same day, Sami's lawyer Shalend Krishna filed writs in the Lautoka High Court, naming President Iloilo, interim prime minister Bainimarama, the Republic of Fiji Military Forces, the Ministry of Home Affairs, and interim attorney-general Khaiyum as defendants in a civil case challenging the authority of the president to dismiss him. Sami was also claiming damages for the termination of his contract, as well as for the travel ban.

Justice John Connors gave the five defendants fourteen days to acknowledge the amended documents.

== Notes ==
Preceded by Grish Maharaj	Chief Executive Officer of Fiji Sugar Cane Growers Council; 2000–2006	Succeeded by Jai Gawander
