= Vishal Sangh =

Vishal Sangh was a cane farmers' union established in Fiji on 1 September 1946, by mainly Sikh farmers, who refused to re-join the Kisan Sangh after its reunification following its split into two factions in 1943. It was led by Mehar Singh, one of the founding members of the Kisan Sangh and its former vice-president.

The Vishal Sangh played an active role in negotiations for cane contracts in 1950 and 1960 but always aligned itself with A. D. Patel and the Maha Sangh. It was regarded by many as a tool of A.D. Patel in his political ambitions. The Sikhs supporting the Vishal Sangh remained loyal members of Federation Party for many years.

Because of its small support base, the Vishal Sangh had an insignificant impact on the Fiji sugar industry after 1960.

== See also ==
- Federation of Cane Growers
- National Farmers Union of Fiji
- Sugar Cane farmers unions in Fiji
