= Faiz Mohammad =

Faiz Mohammad may refer to:

- Faiz Muhammad Kateb, Afghan writer and historian
- Faiz Muhammad, Pakistani wrestler
- Haji Faiz Mohammed, Guantanamo Bay detainee

== See also ==
- Muhammad Faiz (disambiguation)
