= Fiji Cane Growers Association =

The Fiji Cane Growers Association (FCGA) is a cane farmers' union established in 1992 by supporters of the National Federation Party (NFP).

After the 1987 military coup in Fiji, most of the farmers' unions curtailed their activities, leaving the National Farmers Union (NFU) as the only active farmers' union in the country. Consequently, when elections were held for the Sugar Cane Growers Council in March 1992, the NFU won 33 of the 38 elected positions. It then came as no surprise when the NFP, which had decided to contest the May 1992 elections, tried to shore up its support amongst cane farmers by setting up a rival union, the FCGA. This move paid dividends to the NFP as it won 14 of the 27 seats reserved for Indians in the House of Representatives and its leader, Jai Ram Reddy, became the Leader of the Opposition.

Although the FCGA has never won the majority of the seats in the Growers Council, it has been able to exercise control over the council with the help of independents and the 8 Government appointed Councillors.

Following the 2006 Fijian coup d'état the military regime arbitrarily dismissed the chief executive of the council, Jagannath Sami. The military regime subsequently ignored a court order that he be reinstated. He was replaced by Jai Gawander.
