= Ganesh Chand =

Fijian academic and former politician of Indian descent

Dr. Ganeshwar Chand
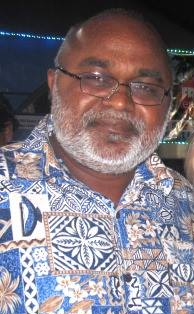

Member of House of Representatives (Fiji) Lautoka City Indian Communal Constituency
- In office 1999–2006
- Preceded by: None (new constitution)
- Succeeded by: Jai Gawander

Minister for Local Government, State Planning, and Housing (Fiji)
- In office 1999–2000

Personal details
- Party: Fiji Labour Party
- Profession: Academic, former Vice Chancellor of three universities

Dr. Ganeshwar Chand, better known as Ganesh Chand, is a Fijian academic and former politician of Indian descent. He was Vice-Chancellor of Solomon Islands National University from 2019 to 2022. He was a founder of the University of Fiji and serves as a trustee of the Fiji Institute of Applied Studies and as editor of Fijian Studies: A Journal of Contemporary Fiji and the Global Girmit Institute. He was Vice-Chancellor of the Fiji National University from February 2010 until he left his post after a disagreement with the University Council in December 2014.

== Background, and political involvement ==
From 1999 to 2006, Chand represented the Lautoka City Indian Communal Constituency, one of 19 reserved for Indo-Fijians, having won for the seat for the Fiji Labour Party (FLP) in the parliamentary elections of 1999 and 2001. He was Minister for Local Government, National Planning, Housing and Environment in the government of Prime Minister Mahendra Chaudhry, in 1999 and 2000.

On 19 May 2000, he was among the 43 members of the People's Coalition Government, led by Mahendra Chaudhry, taken hostage by George Speight and his band of rebel Republic of Fiji Military Forces (RFMF) soldiers from the Counter Revolutionary Warfare Unit. He was released on 13 July 2000 after 56 days of captivity.

Chand was considered one of the more moderate members of the FLP, and spoke against the practice of using the "fear factor" to attract votes. He also made headlines on 21 November 2005, when he spoke of the positive aspects of the government's budget, and praised the government for implementing some of the Opposition's recommendations. He added that the budget was the best of all the government's bad budgets.

Chand is considered an authority on Indian migration to Fiji, and has written and spoken extensively on the vast economic and cultural contribution of the Indian diaspora, including their critical role in the early development of jazz music in the Lautoka region.

Chand announced his retirement from active politics in 2004. He spearheaded the establishment of the University of Fiji. He was publicly critical of FLP leader Mahendra Chaudhry's choices of Senators for the 2006–2011 term, saying that the appointment of a close relative of Chaudhry's among the Senators could be interpreted by the public as nepotism.

== GOPIO Award ==
The Fiji Live news service reported on 29 December 2005 that at a conference of the Global Organisation of People of Indian Origin (GOPIO) on 5–6 January 2006, Chand would be one of five people to receive the Pravasi Bharatiya Community Service Award. The others were Diljit S. Rana of Ireland, B.R. Shetty of Abu Dhabi, Sudha Acharya, executive director of the South Asian Council for Social Services (SACSS). There was also a special recognition award to Pavan Kumar Darisi of the World Arya Vysya Mahasabha. Chand, an accomplished jazz flautist, performed an abbreviated rendition of the Oscar Peterson standard 'I Love Paris' at the prizegiving reception. The awards, which are granted to persons of Indian ancestry for their contributions to the countries they are members of, were presented by Governor Sushil Kumar Shinde of Andhra Pradesh.

The conference was held as a prelude to the Pravasi Bharatiya Divas, which ran from 7–9 January. The theme of the conference is "Global Indian Diaspora: Today and Tomorrow". Chand was one of the speakers at the conference, one of many organized by GOPIO since its inception in 1989.

Chand was the second citizen of Fiji to receive this award, the first being Mahendra Chaudhry in 2004. The citation for the award praised him for his role in campaigning for the restoration of democracy in Fiji in the wake of the two coups which deposed the Bavadra government and severed Fiji's links to the British Monarchy in 1987, and also noted his role in the establishment of the University of Fiji to cater for underprivileged students. He was also an accomplished author, the citation said.

== Lawsuit ==
It was announced on 5 September 2006 that Chand was suing the Fiji Times for what he claimed was a defamatory report on the front page of the newspaper, on 26 August 2000. The report claimed that police were investigating his alleged involvement in the theft of government property, including furniture, from his office. Chand told the High Court in Suva that he knew nothing of any investigation until reading the allegations in the Times. Police had questioned him and searched his home, from which some items had also been stolen, he said, but he did not consider that to constitute a police investigation.

Times counsel Ian Roche told the court on 21 September 2006 that the report had been "accurate" and in the public interest. Justice Gwen Philips adjourned the case to 3 November, the Times reported.

Chand claimed F$150,000 in damages and a further F$75,000 in aggravated damages, and a court order to prevent further defamation. He also demanded a front-page apology in Fiji's three daily newspapers. Judgment was delivered in early 2007 in favour of the Fiji Times. Chand appealed the judgment to the Fiji Court of Appeal, which upheld the High Court's decision.

== Director of FIT ==
On 25 September 2007, Dr Chand was appointed the Director of the Fiji Institute of Technology (FIT).

== Vice-Chancellor of Fiji National University ==
In 2009, Chand was appointed the Chairperson of an Interim Council given the responsibility of establishing a national University for Fiji. Other members comprised the heads of government tertiary institutions. The university was established in 2010. On 2 November 2009, it was announced that Chand would be the first Vice-Chancellor of the new Fiji National University, which was formed by the merger of six tertiary colleges in Fiji, including FIT. The university progressed to considerable acclaim by the Government. On 29 December 2014, Chand's contract was "brought to an amicable end" after he was paid the balance of his contract.

On 1 April 2015, Chand was accused of abuse of office by the Fiji Independent Commission Against Corruption, for allegedly using $213,000 of university funds to pay for the medical treatment of the Chairperson of the FNU Council in 2012. Chand stated that the medical treatment of the chairperson was under the Health scheme which covered medical costs of all FNU Council members, including its chairperson. After a long investigation, the prosecution withdrew the case on 29 November 2018 because it claimed that it could not find the key prosecution witnesses, a claim which is incorrect as the witness has a public profile (Poasa Koroitamana, who operates a business in the US with his contact details readily available on social media), and was contacted many times by FICAC but he refused to provide false evidence as FICAC wanted him to. Chand maintained that the prosecution was politically motivated by some Government Ministers who felt threatened by his defense of academic freedom, and some senior staff who were threatened by internal audits implicating them in abuse of large sums of money.

== Vice-Chancellor of Solomon Islands National University ==
On 5 March 2019, Chand was appointed the new Vice-Chancellor of Solomon Islands National University. Allegations and counter-allegations of misdemeanors surfaced in 2020. Chand was suspended by the Trades Disputes Panel and his work permit refused by Immigration, forcing him to leave the country in November 2020. The university appealed against the TDP decision and took the matter to the High Court, which in a judgment delivered on 8 February 2021 (Case 415 of 2020), declared the bodies making the allegations "illegal", and vindicated the Vice Chancellor and the university. In July 2021, it was reported that the university had terminated the contracts of all academic staff on the orders on Chand, who remains in Fiji. On 19 August 2021, it was reported by the Solomon Star that the university was close to financial collapse, due to the decision to exclude students with fee arrears and the shortage of qualified teaching staff. On 12 September 2021, it was reported that the SINU Council had frozen Chand's pay because he was unable to return to the Solomon Islands. Three days later, it was reported that enrolments had collapsed from 8,000 at the start of the year to 2,000, with almost no academic staff employed to teach. His position was terminated in 2022.
