= Griffith Business School =

Australian University

Coordinates: 27.962658°S 153.383088°E

Griffith Business School is part of Griffith University in South-East Queensland, Australia. It is a public university with more than 43,000 students circa 2015.

== Academic departments ==
The academic departments offer a range of undergraduate and postgraduate business programs. Areas include franchising, tourism, real estate, and property development, international business, Asian studies, and employment relations.

- Department of Accounting, Finance and Economics
- Department of Employment Relations and Human Resources
- Department of Business Strategy and Innovation
- Department of Marketing
- Department of Tourism, Sport and Hotel Management
- School of Government and International Relations

== Research and Academic Centres ==
Griffith Business School has several research facilities in Asian studies and business, franchising, sport management, tourism, work and employment relations, and governance and public policy.

The school’s four research centers include:

- Centre for Governance and Public Policy — examining governments' capacity, sustainability and accountability.
- Centre for Work, Organisation, and Wellbeing — developing research that is distinctive and relevant to the future of work.
- Griffith Asia Institute — analyzing developments in Asia and the South Pacific's politics, economics, societies, and cultures.
- Griffith Institute for Tourism produces tourism research that has both an academic and external impact.

In addition, five academic centers include:

- Asia Pacific Centre for Franchising Excellence — addressing the need for dedicated research and education in the rapidly growing franchising industry.
- Asia Pacific Centre for Sustainable Enterprise — finding practical and integrated solutions to sustainability issues.
- APEC Study Centre is one of two Australian member institutions in the APEC Study Centre Consortium (ASCC), based at the Griffith Asia Institute.
- Griffith Centre for Personal Finance and Superannuation — producing research in personal finance and superannuation for both academic and external impact.
- Social Marketing @ Griffith — influencing behavior that benefits individuals and communities for the greater social good.

== Accreditation and Professional Associations ==
Griffith Business School has many industry partnerships, including professional connections and accreditations. These include:

- Association of Chartered Certified Accountants
- Australian Human Resources Institute
- Australian Marketing Institute
- Australian Securities and Investments Commission
- CPA Australia
- Chartered Institute of Purchasing and Supply
- Financial Planning Association of Australia
- Financial Services Institute of Australasia
- Institute of Chartered Accountants in Australia
- International Centre of Excellence in Tourism and Hospitality Education

== MBA ==
The Griffith MBA is ranked among Australia's leading MBA programs in CEO Magazine and its 2017 MBA Rankings.

The MBA program was awarded the top rating of five stars with the Graduate Management Association of Australia (GMAA) 5-star rankings. The MBA retained its #4 position among the Top 5 MBA programs in Australia, per the 2017 Australian Financial Review (AFR) BOSS Magazine MBA survey. This Australian MBA ranking is conducted every two years and is primarily based on the feedback of recent alums.

== Notable alumni ==
- Bruce Djite, former footballer and business executive
