= Navua District, Fiji =

District in Serua Province, Fiji

Coordinates: 18°12′S 178°9′W

Navua District is located within Serua Province in the Central Division of Fiji. During colonial times it was a sugar growing area, but the closure of the sugar mill in Navua in 1923 led to a decline in economic activity in the district. The construction of a resort at Pacific Harbour in the 1970s and an influx of tourist related activities has led to increases in economic activity in the area.

== Famous people from Navua ==
- C.P. Singh
- B. D. Lakshman
- Chaitanya Lakshman
- Prince Gopal Lakshman
- Paresh Narayan
- Vashist Muni
- Vishnu Deo

== See also ==
- Navua River
- Navua F.C.
- Ratu Suliano Matanitobua
