= Swami Rudrananda =

Personal life
- Born: Muthukrishnan; 11 March 1901 Manalmedu, Tanjore District, Madras Presidency, British India, (now in Mayiladuthurai district, Tamil Nadu, India)
- Died: 30 June 1985 (aged 84) Nadi, Ba Province, Dominion of Fiji (now Republic of Fiji)

Religious life
- Religion: Hinduism
- Order: Ramakrishna Mission
- Philosophy: Vedanta

Religious career
- Teacher: Swami Shivananda

Swami Rudrananda (11 March 1901 – 30 June 1985), born Muthukrishnan, was an Indian Hindu monk and a disciple of the 19th-century Indian mystic, Swami Shivananda, the direct disciple of Ramakrishna. After moving to Fiji in 1936 he became one of the country's most respected Indo-Fijian leaders, and was a founder of the National Federation Party.

== Early life ==
Born into a wealthy family in the village of Manalmedu in Thanjavur district, he was the first son of Kothandaraman and Bhagyam.

== Career ==
Swami Rudrananda's interests spanned social reform, the congress party of India and poetry by Subramanya Bharathi. He also followed the work of Swami Vivekananda.

In 1923, Mayavaram was flooded due to a heavy downpour. As a flood relief measure, Monks from Ramakrishna Mission travelled to the area. They needed a local contact person who could interact with people affected by the flood, to measure the severity of the flood. Muthukrishnan spoke Tamil, Telugu and English, so he was well suited to help. This interaction led to a growing interest in the Ramakrishna Order, which he later joined at the age of 25, a decision supported by his mother. While his father was initially apprehensive of the idea, eventually he came around to support his son, influenced by the mother's support.

Kalki Krishnamurthy was his childhood friend. To Kalki, his friend Muthukrishnan was a courageous boy who supported him when other boys threatened him.

=== Editor ===
He worked as an editor for Sri Ramakrishna Vijayam magazine for some time. During that time, as per Swami Rudrananda's request, Kalki Krishnamurthy translated the book Our Mother Land by Swami Vivekananda into Tamil.

=== Fiji ===
Rudrananda was sent to Fiji by the Ramakrishna Mission in 1939, as Swami Avinashananda moved to Sri Lanka, to assist Then India Sanmarga Ikya (T.I.S.I.) Sangam in its religious and cultural activities. Swami Rudrananda consolidated and expanded the activities of T.I.S.I. Sangam based at Sangam Ashram in Nadi.

Swami Rudrananda was fondly called a "SarkkariSami", as he was working for the betterment of sugar cane workers in Fiji.

He implemented several measures, notably that Sangam work for all people instead of serving only south Indians. A saffron colored flag was designed for Sangam. Education and Temple constructions were considered as primary needs.

Swami Rudrananda was the first to introduce multiracial and multicultural activities in Fiji to bring the ethnic groups together. He made sure that the Sangam schools and Sri Vivekananda High School were open to all ethnic groups. Swami Rudrananda also organised interfaith services.

He acquired properties for Sangam including freehold land at Savusavu (130 acres) and Madhuvani, Rakiraki (1037 acres). The Sangam Sarada Printing Press was started, on 15 August 1948, to address the educational needs of the community at large.

Publications like Sangam in Tamil, Pacific Review in English, Jagriti in Hindi, and Na Pacifica in Fijian were published and circulated to give voice to the Indian community.

Although Rudrananda initially refused to take part in union or political activities, he worked with A. D. Patel to help found the Maha Sangh. During the 1943 strike, the government restricted his movements amid calls for deportation to India. He remained an active member of the Federation Party. During the strike, he was sentenced to imprisonment with hard labor along with Patel.

In 1951, Rudrananda attempted to amalgamate the Sangam and Ramakrishna Mission into a single organization. This was seen by some South Indians as an attempt by the mission to take over the assets of the Sangam. There was widespread protest, although the founder of the Sangam, Sadhu Kuppuswami, supported Rudrananda. A compromise was reached when the Sri Vivekananda High School was transferred to the Mission and the Sangam ran its schools.

=== Tirukkural in Fiji ===
He got Dr. Berwick to translate the Thirukkural into Fijian.

== See also ==
- Ramakrishna Mission
- South Indians in Fiji
