= Fiji Indian National Congress =

On the fiftieth anniversary of the arrival of the first Indians in Fiji, two different organisations called the Fiji Indian National Congress were formed in Fiji. The acting Governor of Fiji, Alfred W. Seymour, despite European opposition, declared 15 May as a public holiday and as a day of rejoicing. Vishnu Deo and his supporters wanted the day to be marked as a day of mourning and on 12 May, at a meeting in Lautoka, it was decided to form the Fiji Indian National Congress. On 14 May, at another meeting in Suva, Dr Hamilton Beattie, who had taken upon himself the responsibility of improving the status of the Indian community, formed another organisation with the same name.

Vishnu Deo wrote to Jawaharlal Nehru, asking for a copy of the constitution on the Indian National Congress, saying that Indians in Fiji wanted to form a similar Congress and Nehru gave his blessing. On 7 October 1929, at a meeting in Lautoka organised by S. B. Patel, the two Congresses agreed to amalgamate and 7 November 1929 the amalgamation was formalised at a meeting in Suva. S. B. Patel wrote:

We have a National Congress of Fiji. The unity and solidarity among the Indian settlers here today are as they never were before. All sections stand united in one demand for the common franchise. We are all coming closer together day by day. We intend organising provincial and district congresses in all important quarters, and passing resolutions demanding the common franchise, in every Congress committee. We intend to take up the work of educating the masses for political consciousness,

The Congress did not manage to achieve the stated goal, as Patel had hoped, of uniting the Indians in Fiji and disagreement over the distribution of relief funds following floods in 1930 caused the non-Hindu members to leave the Congress.
