= Federation of Cane Growers =

The Federation of Cane Growers was formed as an umbrella organisation to negotiate the new cane contract due to take effect from 1960 with the Colonial Sugar Refining Company.

== Negotiations for 1960 cane contract ==
Talks on the new contract started on 5 January 1960. The farmers’ representatives were K. S. Reddy, P.G. Shankar, Ram Niwaz, Ranga Reddy and S.M. Koya, representing the Maha Sangh, Ram Swami Pillay, Shankaran Nair and Ram Narain representing a second faction of the Maha Sangh, Shiu Dutt, Biryam Singh, Bechu Prasad, Y. Subramaniam and A. D. Patel representing the Vishal Sangh, Vijay R. Singh and Girwar Prasad representing the Labasa Kisan Sangh, and John Percy Bayly, Shiu Nath, Abdul Gani and Ayodhya Prasad representing the Kisan Sangh. The united front did not last as the two Kisan Sanghs accepted the contract offered by the Company while the Maha Sanghs and Vishal Sangh opposed it and called their members out on strike. There were many cases of intimidation, damage to property burning of sugar cane. The crushing of sugar cane which normally begins in May was delayed until October and the growers suffered huge losses. Security forces were called out to break the strike. A Commission of Inquiry was set up and the growers were obliged to accept a contract that protected the millers from any financial risk and left the farmers with a worse outcome than they had had in the last contract.

== From union to political party ==
The supporters of the 1960 strike put up candidates in the sugar cane districts in the 1963 Legislative Council election under the banner of Citizens Federation and all won by large margins. The Federation of Cane Growers members of Legislative Council, together with other like-minded individuals formed the Federation Party in 1964. The name was later changed to National Federation Party with the inclusion of two minor ethnic Fijian parties. Until 1987, the Federation of Cane Growers was the main farmers' union in Fiji, while the National Federation Party was the main party of the Fiji Indians.

== See also ==
- Vishal Sangh
- Maha Sangh
- Kisan Sangh
- National Farmers Union of Fiji
