= South Indians in Fiji =

Indians in Fiji are mainly descendants of the 15,132 contract labourers who were brought to Fiji between 1903 and 1916. This represents about 25% out of a total of 60,965 contract labourers who were brought to Fiji between 1879 and 1916. They were forced in to ships from Madras and were mainly recruited in the districts of North Arcot, Madras, Krishna, Godavari, Visakhapatnam, Tanjore, Malabar and Coimbatore. More than half of the labourers from South India were recruited from North Arcot and Madras, but most of those recruited in Madras were originally from North Arcot and Chingleput.

== South Indian Languages ==
The language spoken by the South Indian labourers was only included in the emigration passes issued in 1903. Of the 589 labourers from South India in 1903, the number of people speaking each language is shown below.

Language	Number	Percentage
Telugu	318	54.0%
Tamil	164	27.8%
Malayalam	31	5.4%
Kannada	17	2.9%
Marathi	33	5.6%
Hindustani	25	4.2%
Total	589	100.0%

In later years more Telugu than Tamil speakers came from South India, as can be seen from subsequent census figures. According to the 1956 census, the number of households speaking each language was as follows:

language	Number	Percentage
Hindustani	17,164	65.9%
Hindi	3,644	14.0%
Telugu	1,498	5.8%
Urdu	1,223	4.7%
Gujarati	830	3.2%
Tamil	797	3.1%
Gurumukhi	468	1.8%
Malayalam	134	0.5%
Other Languages	273	1.0%
Total	26,031	100.0%

Although by 1956 Hindustani (Fiji Hindi) was being used in most Fiji households, the numbers still using South Indian languages indicate that there were twice as many Telugus than Tamils. Malayalam was the third most common South Indian language. From 1929 to 1963, the ability to read and write in Telugu or Tamil was accepted as a literacy qualification to be a voter for elections to the Legislative Council. In 2005, it was revealed that in the 20 primary schools managed by TISI, out of the 4,940 students, 1,765 took Tamil classes and there were only 489 learning Telugu.

== Religious Background of South Indians ==
The South Indian immigrants were made up of a smaller population of Muslims (1,091 Muslims out of 15,132) and a greater proportion of Christians than their North Indian counterparts. The Hindus, who form the majority, belonged to over a hundred different castes.

== Life during Indenture ==
Although South Indians were used to working overseas, most found it difficult to adjust to the Fiji Indian society already established in Fiji. Language was a major problem as they had to learn Hindustani, the language of the plantation. During indenture, there was a high suicide rate amongst South Indians.

== Revival of South Indian Culture ==
At the end of his indenture period, Kuppuswami, Naidu, an ex-policeman and indentured labourer, took up the cause of the South Indians in Fiji. He gave up worldly pleasures, taking up the life of a sadhu (holy man). He was a devotee of Swami Vivekananda, Ramana Maharishi, Ramalinga Swamigal and Ramakrishna Paramahamsa. He later became known amongst his colleagues and South Indians in particular, as Sadhu Swami. He conceived the idea of a South Indian Organisation and worked, towards this goal with the help of other South Indians who could understand his feelings and were prepared to provide assistance towards the cause. According to the data published by TISI in 2002, Tamil was learnt by 1,738 students in 17 schools between grades 1-8 and Telugu by 255 students in 3 schools.

== Birth of Sangam ==
Sadhu Kuppuswami founded the Then India Sanmarga Ikya Sangam (TISI Sangam) after travelling to all parts of Fiji where South Indians were settled, and inspiring them to congregate at the Nadi Sri Siva Subramaniya Swami Temple on Swami Vivekananda's Birthday on 12 January in 1926, where they gave birth to the organisation which is today known as "Sangam". Sadhu Swami was elected the first President of Sangam and he remained its president for his lifetime.

On 26 December 1927, the Madras Maha Sangam, was formed in Suva by Verrappa Muthiah Pillai in Suva and branches were soon established in Levuka and Labasa. In 1937 the Madras Maha Sangam merged with the TISI Sangam.

== Maunatul Islam Association of Fiji (MIAF) ==
Maunatul Islam Association of Fiji (MIAF) represents approximately 30% of the Sunni Muslims in Fiji who are mostly followers of Imam Shafi. The followers of Imam Shafi in Fiji are the descendants of Muslims of Malayalam origin who came to Fiji under the indenture system from Kerala (Malabar) in South India between 1903 and 1916. The organisation originally operated under the name of Then India Maunatul Islam Association of Fiji since it was officially formed in 1942. The original officials were; President: Late Shahbud Dean, Vice President: Late Hajji Moidin Koya, Secretary: Mohammed Shafique, Treasurer: Late Hon A. R. Manu. One of the most famous past President and Speaker of the Association was the late Hon S.M. Koya, who was the leader of the National Federation Party and Leader of Opposition in Fiji for a number of years. The name of the Association was changed in 1982 to Maunatul Islam Association when a new constitution was drawn.

== Swami Avinashananda ==
The early years of the Sangam had their share of problems, but the arrival, on 21 May 1937, of Swami Avinashananda from the Ramakrishna Mission of India, on the invitation of Sadhu Swami, saw the beginning of the golden years of Sangam. Although he spent just a brief period of eleven months in Fiji, Swami Avinashananda was able to consolidate the structure of Sangam and lay down the principles on which it was to function in later years. Swami Avinashananda had the Sangam legally registered as an organisation under the company's act, and A. D. Patel became its general manager. Thus legalised, Sangam and its community set forth in earnest to develop schools and temples to foster South Indian languages, culture and religion in all parts of Fiji. At present, the Sangam controls 21 Primary and 5 Secondary Colleges with innumerable Temples and Kindergartens spread throughout the country.

== Swami Rudrananda ==
Swami Avivashananda was replaced by Swami Rudrananda in 1939. He was soon followed by Ganeshwar Rao, a Telugu teacher, and Rama Krishnan, a Tamil teacher, to teach South Indian mother tongues in the Sangam Schools and to uplift the general standard of Sangam. Rama Krishnan was the first ever graduate teacher to be posted to Nadi Sangam School as its Head Teacher, and Ganeshwar Rao worked with him as his assistant. As a dedicated teacher, the late Rama Krishnan formed the Youth Wing known as the Then India Valibar Sangam (TIV Sangam) and introduced the Inter-District Competition in Soccer, athletics, and Music and Art to encourage the development of South Indian language and culture.

Swami Rudrananda consolidated and expanded the activities of T.I.S.I. Sangam based at Sangam Ashram in Nadi. He acquired properties for Sangam. These included freehold land at Savusavu (130 acres (53 ha)) and Madhuvani, Rakiraki (1037 acres). The Sangam Sarada Printing Press was started on 15 August 1948 to cope with the educational needs of the community at large. Publications like Sangam in Tamil, Pacific Review in English, Jagriti in Hindi, and Na Pacifica in Fijian were published and circulated to give vent to the voice of the Indian community as a whole.

Swami Rudrananda was fondly called as "SarkkariSami" by people as he was majorly working for the betterment of sugar cane workers.

== Women's Wing ==
A Women's Wing was also formed in 1938 as the Then India Sanmarga Maathar Sangam which launched the very simple and humble charitable task of Pidi Arisi, (A handful of rice) which every South Indian householder was required to set aside each day for charity before commencing their household cooking. This noble concept was introduced by Swami Avinashananda as one of the projects to assist in running a hostel for children of poor parents and others living far away from Nadi to gain an education at Nadi Sangam School, which was the first and the largest Sangam School for that time.

== Andhra Sangam ==
The TISI Sangam was dominated by the more numerous Tamils, and concern by the minority Telugus about the promotion of their language led to the formation of their own Sangam. Under the leadership of Veeranna, the Dakshina India Andhra Sangam of Fiji was formed on 20 April 1941 at the Gallau Temple in Ra.

== Shri Vivekananda High School (Now Swami Vivekananda College) ==
The Sangam, continued its pursuit to provide higher education to its pupils by becoming the first non-Government Organisation to start a private Secondary School, the Shri Vivekananda High School, on 9 March 1949. Shri Vivekananda High School began in a very humble way in the T.I.V. Sangam's Gymnasium Hall, in the Nadi Sangam Primary School compound, with 25 students, headed by Mr K.S.Reddy as Principal and Messers Gopal Swami Naidu and Krishna Narsingha Rao as the two assistants. Students from all parts of Fiji, even as far away as Vanua Levu, came to attend the school. As this school grew in strength, it had to shift to the premises of Lora Murugan. It was here that Shri Vivekananda High School developed and later moved to its present site in Malolo and is now managed by the Ramakrishna Mission.

Sangam, Schools and Temples sprang up in different villages and settlements. The Colonial Sugar Refining Company assisted the Sangam by providing land to build schools and temples and having its Field Officers act as school managers. Mother tongue was given priority over other subjects in the schools, and the South Indian languages and culture flourished throughout the country for several decades till the Sangam celebrated its Silver Jubilee in 1951.

With the advent of changes in the education system and the introduction of new examinations in Primary Schools, the emphasis gradually shifted from vernacular and creative subjects to mere academic pursuits. Preparing students for the examinations became the hallmark for the teachers, and keen competition developed as to which school got the largest number of passes became the theme for parents, management and teachers alike. This shift in trend became the cause of the gradual decline of the South Indian languages as they were not examination subjects.

== Ramalingar Mission ==
Concern with the decline of South Indian culture and tradition led to the formation of Fiji Sutha Sanmarga Sangam, a branch of Ramalinagar Sangam in Suva on 14 April 1966, under the leadership of Appa Pillai. He conducted a monthly South Indian program on Radio Fiji and travelled around the country teaching Tamil language and culture and distributing Tamil Readers sourced from India.

== Sangam Rejuvenated ==
With the revival of the Annual Convention, Sangam members from all parts flocked to Lovu during the Easter Holidays of 1976 to rejuvenate the Sangam and later in the same year celebrated its Golden Jubilee from 8th to 10 October 1976 at Nadi. Once again, the organisation was streamlined, and the management commenced functioning smoothly under the new administration. The next decade, from 1976 to 1986, saw gradual improvement in the management and organisation of Sangam assets and properties, and attention was once again drawn towards the revival of the South Indian Languages, religion and culture. The revival of Sangam activities together with the arrival of Shivacharya Mahalinga Gurukkal, whose services were made available to Nadi Siva Subramaniya Swamy Temple in 1984 by the Government of Tamil Nadu as the Chief Priest boosted the activities at the Temple, and devotees flocked to the Temple in very large numbers to witness and participate in the many new and unique religious ceremonies conducted at the Temple for the first time.

== Sri Siva Subramaniya Swami Temple ==
It was realised that a new and bigger National Temple was needed, and a move to acquire a new site began in earnest. The foundation for a new temple was laid at the old site in 1976 during the Golden Jubilee Celebrations by His Excellency the High Commissioner for the Government of India in Fiji. In 1983 new lease was acquired for the Crown land, and the reconstruction programme began with the Bhoomi Pooja in January 1984, followed by the inauguration of building work by the late Deputy Prime Minister in April 1984. The construction work moved another step forward in 1986 when the work of pile driving was completed under the chairmanship of Hon. Jai Ram Reddy. The actual Construction work began in earnest after a lull of some five years under a new Reconstruction Committee led by Narayan Reddy as the chairman. The temple was built in the best traditions of ancient Dravidian Indian Temple architecture as well as the principles of sacred architecture of the Vastu Vedic tradition. The consecration ceremonies of their new national temple were held on July 15, 1994.

== Famous South Indians ==
Sidiq Koya, who was the first Muslim to be elected to the Legislative Council, in 1963, was a South Indian. He became leader of the opposition National Federation Party (NFP) in 1969 and was instrumental in attaining independence for Fiji. He was succeeded as leader of the NFP by another South Indian, Jai Ram Reddy. Some other famous South Indians were M. N. Naidu, a businessman, Sadhu Kuppuswami, founder of TISI Sangam, Swami Rudrananda, missionary and farmers’ leader and politician K. S. Reddy, Muniswamy Mudaliar, and James Madhavan, Manikam Pillai, Y. P. Reddy, S. V. Chetty.

== See also ==
- Swami Rudrananda
- Indo-Fijians
- Gujaratis in Fiji
- Sikhism in Fiji
- Fiji Hindi
