= Kisan Sangh =

Farmers' union in Fiji

- Kisan Sangh
- Founded: 27 November 1937
- Location: Fiji

Kisan Sangh was the first farmers' union formed in Fiji on 27 November 1937. This was the result of one man's determination to address the plight of Fiji's Indian cane farmers. Ayodhya Prasad had arrived from India in 1929, and after a stint as a teacher took up cane farming and thus obtained firsthand experience of the problems faced by Fiji Indian cane farmers.

== Formation of Kisan Sangh ==
Well aware that there was great fear amongst the Fiji Indian cane farmers of the Colonial Sugar Refining Company, he started organising the farmers union in secret and concentrated among the young members of the community because they were more passionate and were unlikely to be owners or lessees of property. At first, Ayodhya Prasad held meetings in secret but by 27 November 1937, he had enough support to hold a public meeting in Wailailai, Ba, to form the Kisan Sangh (Farmers' Union). The first task for the new Union was to find an existing Fiji Indian to take up leadership of the new union. A number of people which included A. D. Patel, S. B. Patel and Swami Rudrananda, Chattur Singh and Vishnu Deo were approached, but all declined the invitation. Undeterred, Ayodhya Prasad decided that the best solution was to learn from Mahatma Gandhi and live amongst the farmers while he preached the virtues of the Union to them. He decided to set up tents on Company land in different settlements so that he and his helpers could preach from it. On 18 May 1938, with the help of his young volunteers, he set up on Company land starting from Nadroga which was at the Southern end of the North Western cane growing area of Viti Levu and moving along the coast to the Northern end of Viti Levu. Initially none of the local farmers approached the tent but as the farmers saw the sacrifice being made by Ayodhya Prasad and his young volunteers and the inability of the Company overseers to stop him, they gradually started to join up. Following the success of this grass-roots campaign, Ayodhya Prasad spent the next four months organising the Sangh. First village committees were formed. These committees then met and formed district committees which selected members for the Central Committee based on the membership of the district committee. There were six district committees.

== Attempts to negotiate with the Company ==
On 5 February 1939, 36 members of the central board of the Kisan Sangh met at the residence of Mohammed Twahir Khan in Lautoka. Mohammed Twahir Khan was unanimously elected the President. Ayodhya Prasad was elected the Secretary. An office was set up in Mr Khan's residence and a letter written to the Company asking for the following:

- The farmers be allowed to keep the second ratoon crop.
- The Company provide a statement with its payment.
- The Company allow the Kisan Sangh’s representative to check the weighing of cane.
- The price of cane not be based on sugar content, but on tonnage.
- The Company not force farmers to work on the train line and to cut its cane.
- The Company and Kisan Sangh meet and draw up a contract for the sale of cane to the Company.
- The Company provide lease on its land in a legal way and each block of land not be less than 16 acres (65,000 m^{2}).
- The Company allow the farmers to plant rice.

When the Company refused to negotiate with the Kisan Sangh, a deputation met the Governor and informed him of the farmers' plight.

== Taking control of cane harvesting ==
The Kisan Sangh put up candidates as Sardar for each of the cane-cutting gangs. Out of a total of 110 gangs in the North Western district, Kisan Sangh's candidates were elected in 85. The Kisan Sangh supporting Sardars refused to send farmers to work in the Sugar Mills. The Kisan Sangh Sardars also informed the Company's overseers that its members will not clear weeds from the Company's train lines. Soon more evidence emerged that the Government had put pressure on the Company to change the way in which it behaved towards to farmers. When the first cane payment was made by the Company, the farmers were also provided with a written account stating the rate at which they had been paid and the amount of deductions. The Company also opened a school for its overseers where they were taught to speak Hindi and the proper manner of communicating with farmers.

== Campaign for cane contract ==
At end of the 1939 cane-cutting season, the Kisan Sangh decided to press for a firm contract for the sale of cane to the CSR Company. At a meeting of farmers from all districts in Lautoka it was unanimously decided not to plant cane until the Company had agreed to a contract. The meeting specifically asked for a 10-year contract, that the price of cane not be based on sugar content, and the price of cane be 16 shillings and six pence as long as the price of sugar remained below 10 dollars per ton and any income more than 10 pounds be shared equally between the Company and the farmers.

When the Company refused to negotiate, Ayodhya Prasad and other Kisan Sangh leaders then concentrated on working amongst the farmers to ensure that the farmers did not plant cane and instead planted Rice, Corn and Peas, confident that if the farmers stuck together, the Government would pressure the Company to act since the strike would have a devastating effect on Fiji's economy.

On 17 January 1940, the Company unilaterally produced a contract and the Company overseers started approaching the farmers to sign it. The contract met some of the demands of the Kisan Sangh. On 27 January, a deputation from the Sangh met the Governor. The Governor advised that since the Company had taken out a contract, the farmers should start planting cane. On 30 January, at a large public meeting in Lautoka the Kisan Sangh advised the farmers to start planting the cane but not to sign the contract.

Finally the Company agreed to meet the farmers (but not as Kisan Sangh representatives). On 6 April 1940, representatives of the Kisan Sangh met the Company's inspector and the Mill Manager at Rarawai Mill in Ba. E.F. Smith (the Company Inspector) explained the contents of the Company offered contract and offered not to implement some of the strict conditions of the contract.

== Formation of rival farmers' union ==
In June 1940, news was received of the setting up of a rival farmers' union by A.D. Patel and Swami Rudrananda. The Central Committee of the Kisan Sangh met and decided that members of the Sangh would attend the inaugural meeting of the Maha Sangh and oppose its inception. At 2:00 p.m. on 15 June, a big crowd of Sangh members gathered in the grounds of Nadi Sangam School. While the meeting for the establishment of Maha Sangh was taking place inside the school, Kisan Sangh members held their own meeting in the grounds and opposed the setting up of a second union but Police had been warned beforehand and Sangh leaders were arrested for not dispersing.

During July, A.D. Patel and Swami Rudrananda started holding meetings to promote their union. Those farmers that had been hired by the Company to campaign against the Kisan Sangh during the strike of 1940 joined the Maha Sangh. The former Sardars removed by Kisan Sangh also joined the new union. Under the influence of Swami Rudrananda, who was himself a South Indian, all but a handful of South Indian farmers who had been members of the Kisan Sangh now joined the Maha Sangh.

In 1943, some executive members of the Kisan Sangh supported the Maha Sangh in a strike for a new contract, despite the fact that the contract signed by farmers in 1940 was for a period of ten years. Ignoring pleas from Ayodhya Prasad, farmers did not start harvesting on time and lost thousands of dollars. In the meantime, efforts by the Government to restrict the movement of A.D. Patel only increased his support while the Kisan Sangh was badly split.

== Rebuilding the Kisan Sangh ==
It took Ayodhya Prasad until 1950 to rebuild the Kisan Sangh so that it was again the largest farmers' organisation in Fiji with support extending to the northern cane farming areas in Vanua Levu and a new farmers' union allied to the Kisan Sangh active in the Rewa area. He also managed to force the Colonial Sugar Refining Company (CSR) to agree a new 10-year contract in 1950 which gave further increases to the price of sugar cane.

In 1959, Kisan Sangh joined a united cane growers' organisation, known as the Federation of Cane Growers, to negotiate the next ten-year contract. Differences again rose between the Kisan Sangh and Maha Sangh supporters resulting in Kisan Sangh's supporters signing the new cane contract, while A.D. Patel's supporters went on strike. The Kisan Sangh was blamed for the failure of the farmers to get a good deal.

== Kisan Sangh and Fiji Indian politics ==
Kisan Sangh's support was concentrated in the North Western districts of Viti Levu and it consistently affected its result. In the 1940 Legislative Council election, the Kisan Sangh supported B.D. Lakshman won North Western Constituency seat in the Legislative Council. Following the split within the Kisan Sangh, A.D. Patel easily won in 1944. A.D. Patel managed to retain this seat with a reduced majority in 1947. In the 1950 election, Tulsi Ram Sharma, who was supported by Kisan Sangh, won the seat by 2340 votes to 1850 votes for A.D. Patel. The Kisan Sangh general secretary, Ayodhya Prasad, was himself elected as the member for North Western Constituency in 1953 and 1956. In 1959, Ayodhya Prasad lost his seat to his one-time ally, B. D. Lakshman.

In the election for the expanded Legislative Council in 1963, three Kisan Sangh supported candidates, lost to A.D. Patel's Citizen's Federation candidates. In the 1966 Legislative Council election, Ayodhya Prasad again stood against A.D. Patel, and lost by a large margin.

== Negotiations for 1960 Contract ==
In 1959, the Maha Sangh and four other cane farmers' unions formed an umbrella organisation known as the Federation of Cane Growers to negotiate with the Colonial Sugar Refining Company for the new cane contract. While negotiations were still in progress, the Kisan Sangh withdrew from the Federation and signed the contract offered by the sugar company, leaving the Maha Sangh as the dominant group within the Federation of Cane Growers.

== The Decline of the Kisan Sangh ==
In the 1970s and 1980s, the Kisan Sangh gradually lost support to the Federation of Cane Growers, which is affiliated to the National Federation Party. When the Fiji Labour Party was formed in 1985, the FLP-affiliated National Farmers Union further eroded the Kisan Sangh, which is at present only a minor player in Fiji sugar industry.

== See also ==
- Vishal Sangh
- Maha Sangh
- Federation of Cane Growers
- National Farmers Union of Fiji
