= Maha Sangh =

Defunct labor union

Akhil Fiji Krishak Maha Sangh (All Fiji Farmers’ Grand Union) was a sugar cane farmers' union formed on 15 June 1941 in opposition to the existing union, the Kisan Sangh. Supporters of Kisan Sangh tried to stop the formation of the Maha Sangh but were unsuccessful. The people responsible for the formation of a second sugar cane farmers' union were A. D. Patel and Swami Rudrananda. The union was supported by the South Indian sugar cane farmers in Fiji.

== The 1943 Strike ==
The Maha Sangh claimed that the 1940 sugar cane contract was not fair to cane farmers, and in 1943 its members went on strike supported by dissident members of the Kisan Sangh, led by Padri Mehar Singh and Ramcharan Singh. The farmers did not gain anything from the strike, but A.D. Patel emerged as a new leader for Fiji Indians and in the 1944 Legislative Council election won the North West Indian seat. The strike action in the middle of the second world war, caused the native Fijians to view the Fiji Indians with suspicion and drove a wedge between the two major races in Fiji.

== Maha Sangh splits into two Factions ==
The Maha Sangh continued to compete with the Kisan Sangh for the support of farmers in the 1940s and 1950s but had its own share of internal divisions. When K.S. Reddy was nominated into the Legislative Council, the leader of the Maha Sangh, A.D. Patel, was for the first time faced with a possible challenge to his leadership, as Reddy was also based in Nadi, was a South Indian like most Maha Sangh supporters and held the powerful position of General Secretary of the union. Competition between the two reached a crisis on 31 March 1956, when at a meeting in Nadi, Reddy asked non-financial members to leave. Their refusal to leave led to police being called and tear gas used. K.S. Reddy later joined the Alliance Party while A.D. Patel had formed the Federation Party, which later merged into the National Federation Party.

== Negotiations for 1960 Contract ==
In 1959, the Maha Sangh and four other cane farmers' unions formed an umbrella organisation known as the Federation of Cane Growers to negotiate with the Colonial Sugar Refining Company for the new cane contract. While negotiations were still in progress, the Kisan Sangh withdrew from the Federation and signed the contract offered by the sugar company, leaving the Maha Sangh as the dominant group within the Federation of Cane Growers.

== See also ==
- Kisan Sangh
- Vishal Sangh
- Federation of Cane Growers
- National Farmers Union of Fiji
