= National Farmers Union of Fiji =

Trade Union in Fiji

The National Farmers Union' (NFU) is one of Fiji's largest trade unions. It was launched in Labasa in July 1978 under the auspices of the Fiji Trades Union Congress, with Mahendra Pal Chaudhry as its first General Secretary. The union was initially based in Vanua Levu but gradually extended its operations to Viti Levu.

== Early Years as a Vanua Levu based Union ==
Although the union was initially only based in Vanua Levu, it had an immediate impact on Fiji's sugar industry, as it exposed the corruption in allocating newly released cane farming land to Minister's wives. It also successfully objected to the appointment of Government representatives to the Sugar Cane Growers Council. In 1981, the NFU had its first major dispute with the Fiji Sugar Corporation (FSC) when it sought compensation for losses incurred by farmers due to the abnormal closure of the Labasa Mill. In the early 1980s, the NFU joined other farmers' unions under an umbrella organisation known as, the Joint Committee of Cane Growers Associations, to take part in the restructure if the sugar industry in Fiji. In 1985, the NFU took industrial action to raise the forecast price of sugar cane from $17.50 per ton to $20 per ton. The NFU also assisted farmers who had suffered losses due to natural disasters.

== As a National Union ==
In 1986, the NFU extended its activities to Viti Levu, and branches were formed in all cane growing districts. Negotiations for a new master award began in 1989 under difficult circumstances as Fiji was under a military dictatorship following the coups in 1987. The NFU asked for 80% of the proceeds from sugar sales to be given to the farmers and a relaxation of the burnt cane penalty. The Sugar Tribunal, instead, decreased the growers' share of proceeds and increased burnt cane penalties. When the FSC refused to entertain any further discussions, the NFU took the matter before the courts. It lost the case but lodged an appeal. While the appeal was in progress, the NFU launched an industrial campaign and held mass rallies. On 30 June 1990, the regime agreed to return to the existing cane contract. Following this win by the NFU, the regime continued to intimidate its leaders but was unsuccessful, mainly due to support from overseas unions and sugar consuming countries.

== Main Union for Sugar Cane Growers ==
An indication of the support enjoyed by the NFU was evident in the general elections of 1992 when Labour Party candidates, supported by NFU won all but one of the rural seats. The Sugar Cane Growers Council elections were held, for the first time since the 1987 coup, in March 1992 and the NFU won 33 of the 38 Council seats.

During the 1997-1998 drought, the NFU asked the Government to assist the farmers. After the Government refused, the NFU boycotted harvesting, forcing the Government to provide farmers with a cash grant and rehabilitation assistance.

== Competition with rival union ==
To undermine the support of NFU, the NFP decided to set up a rival organisation, the Fiji Cane Growers Association, which resulted in the farmers being split although the NFU still enjoys majority support. The support for the two unions can be gauged by the composition of the Sugar Cane Growers Council, which has 38 members elected by the farmers and eight members nominated by the Government. The Sugar Cane Growers Council election is held every three years.

In the 1998 Sugar Cane Growers Council elections, the NFU won 22 seats. In 2001, the National Farmers Union won 21 seats while the Fiji Cane Growers Association won 16 seats. One seat went to an independent. In 2004, the NFU retained its majority in the Sugar Cane Growers Council, winning 22 of the 38 seats contested. It had increased its support by one seat compared to the last results while its rival, the NFP-backed Fiji Cane Growers Association managed only fourteen seats, down two seats from the previous elections. The remaining two seats went to independent candidates. National Farmers Union polled 52 per cent of all votes cast compared to the Fiji Cane Growers Association's 42 percent.

The eight members nominated by the Government and the two independent candidates hold the balance of power. Since the NFU is supported by the Government Party's main rival, the Fiji Labour Party, Government appointees to the Council have always been rivals of the NFU.

== See also ==
- Kisan Sangh
- Federation of Cane Growers
- Fiji Cane Growers Association
- Sugar Cane farmers unions in Fiji
