= Vashist Muni =

Sadhu Vashist Muni
- Born: 1888; Benares, Uttar Pradesh, India
- Died: Unknown; India
- Occupation: Hindu Missionary

Sadhu Vashist Muni was a Hindu missionary from India, who came into prominence in Fiji when he assumed the leadership of the strike in the western districts of Fiji in 1921. Mystery surrounded him during his short stay in Fiji (May 1920 – March 1921) and tales of his miraculous deeds still circulate in Fiji. The Government could not find out much about him from its sources of intelligence but deported him in the belief that he was an agent of Gandhi. After his arrest, the Government House in Suva was struck by lightning and destroyed which only heightened the belief in the power this mysterious sadhu (holy man).

== Early life ==
He was born in Banaras, India, in 1888 and was an orthodox Hindu who spoke Hindi and English fluently. He left Calcutta on 23 March 1919 and arrived in Fiji, via Australia in May 1920. His head was shaven, he wore a light orange robe and carried a light pink umbrella with him. He was greeted with enthusiasm by the local Indian community on his arrival in Fiji. Some thought of him as a reincarnation of Lord Vishnu.

== Activities in Fiji ==
=== Educationist and Missionary ===
Initially he carried out educational work in areas where Fiji Indians were concentrated and is reputed to have doubled the attendance of a school in Lautoka by walking through the settlements and talking to parents. He built a school in Navua, enrolling boys to study Hindi, as he wanted children to be proud of their heritage. He discouraged Indians from attending Christian schools. He donated books to schools and stated that his mission was religious. He came to the attention of the Government in November 1920 when it became aware of his non-political educational work. The Government wanted to have discussions with him on Indian education but did not manage to arrange a meeting with him.

Although he was appalled at the treatment of Indians in Fiji he publicly stated his intention of working through constitutional means to improve the plight of the Fiji Indians. He did not agree with those who were encouraging Indians to return to India. The Fiji Government suspected that he might be an agent of Gandhi and asked Government officials to report on his activities. In one such report he was referred to as the "mystery man", as giving sound advice to the people and responsible for the loss of the influence that N.B. Mitter had enjoyed.

=== 1921 Strike ===
Although the workers of the north-western districts were organised by N.B. Mitter, the strike which began on 11 February 1921, in Ba, was a spontaneous action of the workers and farmers. It spread to all the western districts and Labasa. The strike was peaceful and well organised.

== Deportation ==
On 20 March 1921, while he was addressing a gathering of farmers and labourers at a school in Tavua, he was requested to accompany a police party to Lautoka, on the understanding that the Government wanted to have discussions with him. From Lautoka he was taken by ship to Suva and deported from Fiji on 23 March 1921. On the day when he was deported, the Government House in Suva was destroyed by lightning and the ship on which he was brought to Suva struck a reef.

== Return to India ==
His deportation did not end the strike, which dragged on for six months. After his deportation to India, he made an appearance at the depot in Calcutta where ex-indentured labourers had gathered to ask for return to Fiji. He asked them not to return, undertook a hunger strike and publicly cursed C.F. Andrews, whom he accused of being a recruiter. This seemed to have the desired effect as Andrews was able to bring political pressure on the Indian Government to stop further labour ships departing for Fiji.

== Legacy ==
Although Vashist Mini spent very little time in Fiji, his legacy lives on. There are a number of schools named after him, some of which are:

- Vashist Muni Primary School, Maqere, Tavua
- Vashist Muni Primary, Navua
- Vashist Muni College, Navua
