= Colonial Sugar Refining Company (Fiji) =

In 1873, Colonial Sugar Refining (CSR) began operations in Fiji in 1880 and until it ceased operations in 1973, had a considerable influence on the political and economic life of Fiji. Prior to its expansion to Fiji, CSR was operating sugar refineries in Melbourne and Auckland. The decision to enter into the production of raw sugar and sugar cane plantation was due to the company's desire to shield itself from fluctuations in the price of raw sugar needed to run its refining operations. In May 1880 Fiji's Colonial Secretary John Bates Thurston persuaded CSR to expand into operations into Fiji by making available 2,000 acres (8.1 km^{2}) of land to establish plantations.

== Mills ==
Sugar production had started in Fiji with the collapse of the cotton price in early 1860s. Many small sugar mills were established but these were mismanaged and unprofitable. During the period of low sugar prices in the 1890s, most of these mills closed, leaving only four mills in operation in Fiji at the turn of the century. CSR's first mill in Fiji started crushing sugar cane in Nausori in 1882. Another mill was built at Viria and crushed from 1886 to 1895. It was closed because it was too small to be viable.

The Chalmers brothers built the Penang Mill in 1880 and sold it to Melbourne Trust Company in 1896. The mill was enlarged with machinery from Mago Island (where a mill had closed in 1895) and the increased crushing capacity together with favourable weather conditions enabled the mill to operate independently. The Penang was closed down in 1922 but reopened in 1925 by the Penang Company. In 1926 it was taken over by the CSR.

Other mills were established in Ba in 1886, in Labasa in 1894 and in Lautoka in 1903. At this stage there was only one other non-CSR mill in operation in Fiji. The Navua sugar mill was built by Stanlake Lee in 1884 and operated under the name of Fiji Sugar Company Limited. The mill never made any profit and relied on CSR for support. The CSR did not buy the mill when it came up for sale in 1905 because it wanted other millers in the colony, so that they could approach the Government jointly over tax concessions. It was bought by the British Columbia Refining Company in 1906 and operated as the Vancouver-Fiji Sugar Company. It still failed to make any profit and was closed in 1923. The Nausori Mill was shut down in 1959 because of low sugar content in the cane supplied to it.

== Fijian cane suppliers ==
When sugar mills were being set up in Fiji in the 1870s and 1880s it was hoped that Fijians would be the major supplier of cane. Initially cane was grown by Fijians as a tax crop. Each province was assessed for tax and if the value of the crop handed to the Government exceeded the assessment, a refund was paid to the province. In 1884 Fijians produced 8,884 tons of cane which was 12% of the total cane crushed that year. By 1900, cane supplied by Fijians had risen to 15,447 tons but as a proportion to the total this was only 6%. After 1902, when a change in Government policy allowed cash to be paid for tax, cane supplied by Fijians decreased so that by 1914 cane produced by Fijians was negligible.

== European contractors ==
In 1880, settlers in Rewa had agreed to grow cane for the CSR for 10 shillings a ton. Even with a bonus in 1884 and 1885, planters were unable to earn a living. Many planters wanted to sell their unprofitable land but CSR would not allow this. When the contract expired, CSR was forced to take over these plantations. The CSR acquired more land for growing cane and by 1914 controlled over 100,000 acres (400 km^{2}). There also arrived in Fiji a new set of landholders who either planted cane themselves or leased their land for cane planting.

== European tenants ==
In 1890, CSR started leasing its estates to plantation managers and others with capital. At this time there was a general belief that cane plantations were economically viable due to improved cultivation methods and CSR tenants generally paid less rent than other contractors. From 1905 the CSR came under increasing pressure, by overseers, to lease its large estates because the overseers wanted a share in the profit of the sugar industry.

In 1908, the management of CSR decided to divide its estates into 400 to 1,000 acres (1.6 to 4.0 km^{2}) lots and lease them to its overseers because it was noted that relationship between tenants and their labourers were better than between the company overseers and its Indian labourers. By 1914, most of the CSR's cane was bought from these tenants. One negative effect this had on CSR was that while all the experienced overseers had become tenants, it was left with inexperienced overseers, which led to labour troubles.

== See also ==
- Chelsea Sugar Refinery
- Sugar mills in Fiji
- Rail transport in Fiji#Cane trains
