= Blue Ribbon campaign (Fiji) =

Political campaign in Fiji

The "Blue Ribbon campaign" was the name for the campaign promoting support for the controversial legislation introduced by the Fijian Government in 2005 to establish a Reconciliation and Unity Commission. The name specifically comes from the blue ribbons promoted by the ruling United Fiji Party as a sign of support for the bill. This campaign had the strong support of Prime Minister Laisenia Qarase, Attorney General Qoriniasi Bale, and other members of the ruling coalition and was warmly welcomed by imprisoned coup instigator George Speight. The proposed Commission was intended to have the power (subject to presidential approval) to grant compensation to victims, and amnesty to perpetrators, of the coup d'état which deposed the elected government in May 2000.

The following individuals and organizations declared their support for the legislation.

== Prime Minister Laisenia Qarase ==
Despite mounting controversy and passionate public pronouncements both for and against the legislation, Prime Minister Laisenia Qarase emphatically rejected calls for a national referendum, stating on 23 May 2005 that there is no legislation providing for a referendum to be held. He said that it was the government's prerogative to pass any legislation it wished, and that he did not want to comment further. He referred all questions to Attorney-General Qoriniasi Bale, who was out of the country at the time.

On 27 May, the Fiji Human Rights Commission agreed to hear a complaint filed by four Opposition parliamentarians – Poseci Bune and Daniel Urai of the Fiji Labour Party, Mick Beddoes of the United Peoples Party, and Ofa Swann of the New Labour Unity Party. This decision was criticized on 20 June by Joji Kotobalavu, a spokesman for the Prime Minister, who said that it was inappropriate for the commission to accept complaints about bills before they were tabled and before the public had had a chance to express its views.

Speaking in Auckland, New Zealand on 11 June, Prime Minister Qarase said that his government detected strong support for the legislation from "important and large sections of opinion" – but that media coverage failed to reflect that. He said that the legislation would make it easier for people to come forward who might otherwise be unwilling or afraid to talk. "Some of those already convicted, may be prepared to make a clean breast of things. Others may decide to keep their secrets and remain in custody, with no amnesty", Qarase said.

Qarase reiterated on 14 June that there would be no general amnesty; the proposed Commission is intended to look at each case individually, and recommend amnesty only for those found to be deserving. He said there would be no general amnesty and every applicant would have to argue their case individually. He said that applicants would have to persuade the Commission that their motives for involvement in the coup were not criminal. They would also have to make full disclosure of everything they knew.

Qarase said that many people were opposed to the legislation because they misunderstood how its amnesty provisions would function. He also implied that they were mean-spirited: "They favour the strict application of punishment as retribution or revenge. There is apparently no room in their thinking for amnesty, as an ingredient of restorative justice. The offenders are not deserving of any form of mercy and forgiveness."

He said that there was international precedent for the legislation. "The sections of the Bill dealing with amnesty were not plucked out of thin air. They have been taken from legislation adopted and successfully used elsewhere. The principles of amnesty are well known and accepted internationally. We have done the research on this", he declared.

Prime Minister Qarase said on 8 July that he thought the legislation would end investigations into the 2000 coup. Speaking at a meeting in Kubulau in Bua Province, Qarase said that the legislation was necessary to prevent the investigations from dragging on endlessly. "I mean, if 10,000 to 20,000 people are going to be investigated, God knows when it will end," he declared. "Trial after trial and the list goes on. About 2500 people have been investigated. Those who turned up in Parliament was close to 20,000 people." He added, however, that litigation currently in progress will not be affected, except at the discretion of the courts.

Qarase said on 14 July that the debate on the legislation involved many issues of critical importance to the country. He acknowledged that sensitive questions of race and culture were at stake, but insisted that it was important to "learn to respect each other's views and to differ without anger or ill will."

On 22 July, Qarase announced that if the legislation were passed, there would be an inquiry into the underlying causes of the 2000 coup, as well as the earlier 1987 coups. "We need to concentrate more than ever on identifying the reasons for the upheavals of 1987 and 2000 and making sure that such tragedies never happen again," Qarase said at a meeting of the National Advisory Council, a think-tank representing Fiji's ethnic communities, which he chairs. He said there was a fundamental lack of trust between Fiji's two main racial groups, coupled with radically different understandings of the events of 2000. For most indigenous Fijians, he said, the coup was about indigenous rights, whereas for most Indo-Fijians, it was simply a lawless act of terrorism. He did not condone the acts, he said, but believed that it was time to bring closure to the painful aftermath of the coup, which had dragged on long enough. "Wounds are reopened when cases go to court and convictions handed down. Racial tensions increased and there was further uncertainty and apprehension," he said. (The Prime Minister's comments were rejected the next day by Opposition Leader Mahendra Chaudhry, who said that the principal reason behind the coups of both 1987 and 2000 was greed, and that it was a "lie" to say that they were carried out in the name of indigenous interests).

At an address to the Lautoka Chamber of Commerce on 23 July, Qarase spoke at length about the bill. He said there was "no question" of withdrawing it, as to do so would be a "denial" of democracy. He denied that the fundamental purpose of the bill was to pardon all who were imprisoned on coup charges. "There is no free pass to amnesty for anyone," he insisted. He also said that while he recognized that expatriate businessmen working in Fiji had a right to comment on issues that were directly related to their commercial and professional undertakings, they "should exercise care and discretion to avoid crossing the line into active politics." His admonition reinforced a warning to the Fiji Employers Federation from the Ministry of Home Affairs that foreign workers and businessmen who spoke against the government would risk forfeiting their permits. Conference participants were not allowed to question the Prime Minister about the parts of his speech related to the Unity Bill.

On 26 July, Qarase reacted angrily to remarks by Opposition Leader Mahendra Chaudhry, who accused him of manipulating the country's Provincial Councils and using them as rubber stamps to gather support for the legislation, and that it was presumptuous for the councils to speak on behalf of all people in their respective provinces. Qarase said that indigenous Fijians were capable of making up their own minds. "It is an insult for him to think Fijians cannot think and make decisions on their own," he said. Chaudhry should learn not to brush aside the remarks of Fijians, the Prime Minister said. He also rejected claims by Lauan Senator Adi Koila Nailatikau, the daughter of former Prime Minister, President, and Paramount Chief of Lau that most Provincial Council members who endorsed the bill had not understood it properly. Qarase said that on the contrary, most people were well informed about the legislation, and supported it because they did understand it and agreed with it.

The Prime Minister reiterated on 27 July that there would be no referendum. He claimed that he personally favoured one, but said the Constitution did not allow for it. "It's a pity, a serious oversight but I personally am in favour of carrying out a referendum," he said.

Qarase said it would not be possible to investigate and charge all the individuals, estimated at over 30,000, who had converged at the parliamentary complex during the crisis of May 2000. He considered reconciliation to be the only way forward. He admitted, however, that the bill would be no guarantee against future coups. It would, however, create an atmosphere conducive to reconciliation, tolerance, and unity, he considered. "However, with a resounding yes I say we can reconcile and that it really is a matter of the heart," he said.

Qarase also said that the government was fine-tuning the bill to ensure its compliance with the Constitution.

On 28 July, Qarase hailed the decision of the powerful Great Council of Chiefs and the Methodist Church to endorse the legislation. "The decision was made in the best interest of the country and a significant milestone in the process of consultation," he said. Earlier, in an address to the Great Council, Qarase had reiterated a previous assertion that to withdraw the bill would be a denial of democracy. The government would not withdraw it, he said, but would adjust the details of it to accommodate the views of all sections of the community. He also said that a National Council of Reconciliation and Unity would soon be established, which would explore ways to foster reconciliation and cooperation among Fiji's diverse ethnic groups.

Faced with continuing opposition to the bill, Qarase pleaded with opponents such as Opposition Leader Mahendra Chaudhry and United Peoples Party leader Mick Beddoes to give the bill a chance, saying they had "a rare opportunity to help bridge the obvious gulf between our people." Speaking on Fiji TV on 30 July, he insisted that the bill was not about the Fijian people as an ethnic group, but about the country as a whole. "I think the overwhelming Fijian support for the Bill is saying we are offering a hand of reconciliation, a hand of forgiveness, a hand of friendship, a hand of repentance and unity. I were in Chaudhry's shoes I would grab the opportunity to try and establish dialogue through this Bill with the Fijian people to promote reconciliation and unity and I will do the same with Mr Beddoes as well," Qarase said.

In a statement on 4 August, the Prime Minister insisted that the bill was not just for the benefit of indigenous Fijians, but for all the country's citizens. It was his personal push for national reconciliation, he said, and it would be up to members of the public as to how to respond.

On 16 August, Prime Minister Qarase rebuffed an offer to negotiate the legislation, provided that it was withdrawn pending the reaching of a consensus and that it be referred to the Tanaloa talks, a University of Hawaii-mediated forum for government-opposition negotiations that took place during 2004. The Tanaloa talks had been a failure, Qarase said, and it was unacceptable for the opposition to set preconditions for negotiations. "I welcome his willingness to discuss the Reconciliation and Unity Bill with the Government but he has put forward two ... quite impossible pre-conditions. One of those conditions is that the Reconciliation Bill must be referred to the Talanoa Dialogue and secondly we must withdraw the bill even before we discuss it. He wants to start afresh. Now this is not a trade union. We are running a government, and if he wants to come in engage the Government in discussion on this very important issue, he must come in without any pre-conditions", the Prime Minister declared.

== Attorney-General Qoriniasi Bale ==
On 15 June, Attorney-General Qoriniasi Bale declared that the fate of the government was linked to the passage of the bill. "If the Bill goes down, the Government goes down with it," Bale told a public meeting in Suva. At the same meeting, however, Jale Baba, National Director of the ruling United Fiji Party, denied that the legislation was being pushed for electoral reasons, saying that politically speaking, it was not advantageous to the government which was, he claimed, promoting it on principle, not for political gain.

On 29 June, Attorney-General Bale conceded that adjustments to the bill were possible, but criticism would be considered only if it was constructive. He was responding to concerns raised by Ratu Isaia Gonewai, Deputy Chairman of the Nadroga-Navosa Provincial Council, about the impact of criticism from foreign organizations and governments. Bale responded that while he was open to discussion about altering some of the details, the government would not be influenced by foreign intervention, and that if local and international opponents continued to lobby against the bill without making any constructive suggestions on how to improve it, parliament would probably pass it intact.

Bale claimed that the bill was essential for reconciliation between Fiji's two main ethnic groups. "The Bill is important to overcome the differences in the country before it reaches the extreme of major bloodshed as experienced in other countries. We want to get rid of the huge distrust and racial hatred that is being harboured by some members of the country's two major races as a result of the May 2000 coup," he said.

On 21 July, Bale claimed that the bill had been in the pipeline for a long time. The aftermath of the 2000 crisis was negatively affecting the fabric of society, he said, and the government had long wanted to address that, but had delayed doing so until now because it could be misinterpreted as an attempt to cover up the actions of wrongdoers. But five years later, there was still no end in sight, and "the government felt it was time to do something about it proactively," he said. He did not expect everybody to be happy with the government's moves. "There will always be division in the views of our people, whether we are doing right or adequately."

Reacting to statements from Military Commander Commodore Frank Bainimarama that whatever amendments might be forthcoming, the Military was still opposed to the legislation, Bale declared on 26 October that the Military was entitled to its opinion, but it was not the government. The government and not the Military, he said, was the final arbiter on the bill. He denied claims that the bill was unconstitutional, saying that proposed amendments were to take account of public opinion, not to correct noncompliance with the Constitution.

Bale also said that the government would not require additional funding to set up the envisaged Commission.

== Other politicians and chiefs ==
- Former Prime Minister Sitiveni Rabuka took a measured position in relation to the government's proposed commission. On 19 May 2005, Rabuka said that the objective of the commission should not merely be to grant amnesty and compensation, but to uncover the truth about who was involved in the coup, directly or indirectly. "It should be able to get to all those who were behind the coup and not only us who were widely accused of taking part. It should be able to reveal those who planned it, financed it and executed it," Rabuka said. The prospect of amnesty, he said, might encourage some individuals to come forward who might otherwise be unwilling to talk.
- Joe Vala Cakau, a former publicity director for the Fijian Political Party, said the bill, which would promote unity among all of Fiji's communities, was long overdue. In a statement on 23 May, he said persons on trial or in prison for coup-related offenses were also victims in their own way. "I am sure that most people would like to get on with their lives and forget about the past," Cakau said.
- Ratu Amenatave Rabona Ravoka, a senior chief from Bua Province, said on 28 May that "every right thinking person should support the bill." He said that forgiveness was an important part of Fijian culture. He supported the compensation provisions of the legislation also. "A lot of people may have lost more than what the compensation can cover," he said, "but at least the Government was able to recognise their hurt and loss."
- Nationalist Vanua Tako Lavo Party General Secretary Iliesa Duvuloco said on 10 June that his party strongly supported the bill, and announced plans for a march through the streets of Suva. Leaders of the Nationalist Party have been imprisoned for coup-related offences. He was joined on 8 July by Soane Nakuna and Soane Tobewaqiri, both unsuccessful candidates for the party in the parliamentary election of 2001. People opposed to the bill did not know the true meaning of reconciliation, they said. "These people should go and read the Gospel according to Matthew from chapters five to seven if they want know the true and correct interpretation of reconciliation," Tobewaqiri said. He said the Fiji Law Society, which strongly opposed the bill, was a stumbling block to reconciliation. He also said that chiefs involved in the 2000 coup may have had the best of intentions, saying that they had a right to leadership.
- Ratu Aca Soqosoqo, a Kadavu chief, said in a parliamentary submission on 15 June that despite his initial reservations, he supported the bill. He had prayed over it, he said, and was convinced that it was "from God," and that all Christians should support it. "If you're a Christian support this Bill," he said. "It is from God."
- Senator Adi Litia Cakobau (one of nine Senators nominated by the Prime Minister) announced a campaign on 19 June to educate the people on the bill. The Fiji Institute for Research and Education (FIRE), which she leads, would embark on a leaflet campaign. The leaflets, titled Na Dodonu ni Taukei ("The Rights of Indigenous Fijians") would promote the bill as safeguarding the rights of the Fijian people as owners of the land, she said. She complained that laws dating from colonial times made it difficult for ethnic Fijians to protect their landowning rights, a situation she said contravened Article 17 of the Universal Declaration of Human Rights. Besides Cakobau, FIRE includes Senator Asesela Ravulu, who is also a professor at the University of the South Pacific, and Mere Samisoni, a businesswoman.
- The Vugalei Landowners Association, which includes members from the districts of Bau, Vugalei, Tai Vugalei, Naitasiri, Viria and Nausori, gave guarded approval to the legislation on 28 June. Vugalei chief Ratu Netava Tagi said that despite reservations about some of the amnesty provisions, the association supported the legislation in principle. He said that those responsible for the upheaval of 2000 should face the brunt of the law, but that those who had followed them should not be punished. "We believe that those who had followed those inside the Parliamentary complex should not be punished because they were just followers who knew nothing about the law," Tagi said.
- Jale Baba presented the parliamentary submission of the ruling United Fiji Party (SDL), of which he is the Director, on 30 June. He said that amnesty was constitutional and should be an integral part of the justice system. This bill would, he said, "allow the people of Fiji to hear and come to terms with the truth of the events that led to and followed the May 2000 crisis." He said it was not true that the bill's purpose was to keep the coalition government intact, and accused the opposition Fiji Labour Party, which opposes the bill, of having done the same thing when it tried to broker a coalition deal with the Conservative Alliance (a nationalist party, a number of whose prominent members have been convicted of coup-related offences). Baba denied that the amnesty provisions of the 1990 and 1997 Constitutions had contributed to the 2000 coup, and doubted that harsher penalties would have deterred it, saying that there were countries which executed coup-plotters but still had coups.

While supporting the legislation, Baba denied on 26 October that it was reflective of SDL policy. It was a government initiative, he said, not a party one, and would not affect their support base.

- Former Parliamentarian Timoci Silatolu, currently serving a life-sentence for his role in the coup, said at a court appearance on 8 July that he was in favour of the bill, and was seeking permission from prison authorities to deliver a submission to Parliament's Justice, Law and Order committee, which is looking into the legislation. "I believe the Bill is within the ambits of the Constitution and I fully support it," Silatolu said.
- Senator Apisai Tora harshly criticized the Military on 23 August for opposing the legislation. He said that the Military was playing politics and not following democratic procedure, and he took a dim view of military teams visiting villages to campaign against the bill.

== Provincial Councils ==
- The Ba Provincial Council declared its support for the bill on 5 July, following a vote of 23-2 by the chiefs of the province, the nation's largest. This vote followed clarifications from Attorney-General Bale, following reservations expressed by certain Council members on 28 June.
- The Bua Provincial Council announced on 11 July that its chiefs and members had voted unanimously to support the bill, following a special visit from Prime Minister Qarase and a team from the Attorney-General's office, which explained the legislation in detail. Council Chairman Ratu Filimoni Ralogaivau told the Prime Minister that the council fully supported the bill.
- The Cakaudrove Provincial Council endorsed the bill at a special meeting in Yaroi Village in Savusavu on 14 July. The Council Chairman, former Prime Minister Sitiveni Rabuka, declared a personal interest in the matter, as one under investigation for his alleged involvement in the 2000 coup, and declined to chair the meeting, handing over to his deputy, Ratu Sairusi Daugunu.
- The Council of Rotuma declared its support for the bill on 1 July. Council Chairman Injimo Managreve said that forgiveness was a part of the island's culture. Managreve said the seven traditional chiefs from the island had all endorsed the bill, and the seven elected members of the council had followed suit. "We are being looked after by the Government and the GCC of Fiji and if anything happens to them we will also go down with them. That is why we are standing behind them and supporting them with their new Bill," he said.
- Kadavu Provincial Council Chairman Ratu Josateki Nawalowalo said on 23 June that he supported the bill. He said it was time for Fijians to focus on positives, not negatives, and called on opponents of the legislation to get behind the government and support its initiatives to take the country forward. He also invited Attorney-General Bale to address the council to explain the provisions of the legislation more fully, after which the Provincial Council unanimously endorsed it. On 27 June, he pleaded with military and other opponents of the legislation to give it a chance, as the chiefs, "in their wisdom," had endorsed it. He expressed hope that common sense would prevail.

Meanwhile, Sitiveni Qio, the youth coordinator of the Kadavu Provincial Council, said that teams of soldiers that were travelling throughout the country to explain the Military's opposition to the legislation to rural Fijians, would not be welcome in Kadavu.

- The Macuata Provincial Council announced on 13 July that it was supporting the bill, following a meeting with Prime Minister Qarase.
- The Naitasiri Provincial Council declared its support on 1 July. Council chairman Ratu Solomoni Boserau said that the forgiveness was the only way for the country to move forward. "We need to forgive those who have hurt us and get on with life. We cannot continue to live together with hurt because it only leads to division. The Bill will bring us together and that is why we are supporting it," Boserau said.
- The Ra Provincial Council endorsed the bill on 8 July, saying that it could ease some of the pain, misery, and suffering experienced in 2000. Chairman Simione Naikarua said that some members of the council had opposed it on the basis of a "misconception" about what the bill contained, and he thanked a visiting government team for having given a presentation in the Fijian language. They had been assured, he said, that the bill "would not impinge on the integrity and independence and will not interfere in the work of the judiciary, the Director of Public Prosecutions and the police."
- The Rewa Provincial Council came out in favour of the bill on 15 July. Council Chairperson Ro Teimumu Kepa, who is also a Cabinet Minister in the Qarase government, described the legislation as "a way of bringing the country back to stability." She said that all nine districts of the province had endorsed the bill after its amnesty provisions, which had concerned many of them, had been explained by a team led by Attorney-General Bale.
- The Serua Provincial Council voted to support the legislation on 5 July. Council Chairman Atunaisa Lacabuka said that the bill would promote unity among Fiji's diverse races and would provide a way forward for reconciliation. The council also tied its support for the legislation to native Fijian land rights and cultural values, which Lacabuka said were based on Christian principles. These principles should be taught, he considered, to non-Christians - a reference to the 94 percent of Indo-Fijians who are either Hindu or Muslims.
- The Tailevu Provincial Council declared its support for the bill on 6 July. Council Chairman Josefa Serulagilagi said that they were satisfied with an in-depth explanation from Attorney-General Bale, and took it as "a good and healthy sign that democracy is alive and well."
- At a meeting from which the media were barred, the Lau Provincial Council voted on 25 July to endorse the bill. It was the last of Fiji's fourteen Provinces to vote on the matter, and the vote of support followed similar verdicts from the other thirteen Provincial Councils. The vote was seen as significant, however, as the Lau Islands are the homeland of Prime Minister Qarase and Attorney-General Bale, the chief promoters of the bill, and of the late Prime Minister, President, and Paramount Chief of Lau, Ratu Sir Kamisese Mara, whose family is bitterly opposed to it. Nine of the Province's thirteen districts voted in favour of the legislation, with two opposed. One district abstained, and one did not send any representatives to the meeting. Radio Legend News reported that the two districts opposed to the bill were Lomaloma and Lakeba, Mara's home area. His daughter, Senator Adi Koila Nailatikau, was too disappointed to speak to the media following the vote, but later said that the Council members had not adequately understood the ramifications of the bill and how it would undermine the judiciary.
- The Provincial Councils of Lomaiviti, Namosi, and Nadroga-Navosa have also endorsed the bill.

== The Great Council of Chiefs ==
The Great Council of Chiefs endorsed the bill at a meeting on 27 July. The endorsement came after more than two months of reserving judgement in the light of vociferous public objections.

On 18 May, Ratu Ovini Bokini, Chairman said that the Great Council had not been consulted and was "in the dark" about the bill. He said that attempts to obtain a copy of the bill from the government had come to nothing. The government had not released its draft bill, but a copy was leaked to the media and was published by the Fiji Times.

Ratu Bokini's comments drew an immediate response from Prime Minister Laisenia Qarase, who said that he saw no need for prior consultation with anybody. "Any Bill is drafted without consulting any party or stakeholders is because it contains what the Government wants to be included in the Bill," Qarase said.

The Great Council of Chiefs had the power to pass or block the bill by instructing its 14 Senators in the 32 Member Senate on how to vote. As they hold the balance of power between the 9 Senators appointed by the Prime Minister and the 8 appointed by the Leader of the Opposition, a block vote by the chiefly Senators would decide the outcome. On 19 July, however, Great Council secretary Asesela Sadole said that their Senators would not be instructed on how to vote, but would be left free to follow their consciences.

In a speech to mark Ratu Sukuna Day on 30 May, in honour of Fiji's first modern statesman, Ratu Sir Lala Sukuna, Bokini cautioned against a one-sided approach to reconciliation, saying that it was not something that could be forced. "It must be allowed to grow through a shared understanding of what we all want and where we are all heading," he said. "Only then can we negotiate seriously about what to give and what to take and this process takes time and patience," he said.

Great Council secretary Sadole announced on 17 July that the council had translated the bill into Fijian for the perusal of its members, pending a meeting to be held in the third week of July. Sadole said that the council would consider the bill on its own merits, without reference to what outsiders have been saying for or against it. "Most people have not actually sat down to read the Bill. It seem that most of their opinions is formed by other opinions. We do not want outside consultations to influence the meeting and by taking out our own translation, it can really help," Sadole said.

Meanwhile, Opposition Leader Mahendra Chaudhry warned the chiefs against possible deception by the government. He said that the government had already misled church leaders about the bill, and could not be trusted not to similarly mislead the chiefs. National Alliance Party President Ratu Epeli Ganilau similarly called on the government not to try to "fool" the Great Council of Chiefs.

A Great Council of Chiefs meeting to consider the bill, starting on 26 July, is now considered likely to approve it, as 45 of its 55 members are delegates from Fiji's fourteen Provinces and one Dependency (Rotuma), all of which have endorsed the legislation. The Fiji Military Forces and the Methodist Church are to make submissions at the meeting, but the secretariat of the Great Council had refused a request from the opposition Labour Party (FLP) to make one, ostensibly because of time constraints and on the ground that if they accepted a submission from the FLP, they would have to accept one from every political party.

The Great Council qualified its endorsement of the bill by urging the government to consider the concerns raised by its opponents, including the Military. The council supported the maintenance of law and order, but upheld the prerogative of the government to make whatever laws it considered fit, adding that there are legal channels that opponents may use to challenge such laws. They also affirmed that the nation's chiefs represent the entire population, not only indigenous Fijians.

Prime Minister Qarase hailed the decision, saying that he had received the "overwhelming support of the Fijian people," but Opposition Leader Mahendra Chaudhry said that the chiefs had failed to address the issue properly, and that he would continue to fight the bill. Another opponent of the bill and former Great Council of Chiefs Chairman Ratu Epeli Ganilau said that he would have expected the chiefs to have taken more time to consider and debate the matter, but that their decision would make no difference in the end because it was Parliament that would decide on the bill.

Military commander Commodore Frank Bainimarama, one of the most unyielding opponents of the legislation who had attacked it in an address to the Great Council lasting more than an hour, issued a statement on 29 July strongly critical of the decision. Bainimarama said that the Military accepted the decision of the Great Council to endorse the legislation, but said that the Military would continue to oppose it.

Great Council Chairman Bokini said on 30 July that the chiefs had endorsed the legislation on the basis of a number of reasons that the Military should consider. They had supported the bill on the basis of truth and justice, and of the Christian beliefs upheld by the great majority of their members. It was the norm in Fijian culture to resolve differences through dialogue and consensus, he maintained. He hoped that the Military would take these considerations into account.

== Religious organizations ==
The Methodist Church announced its support for the bill on 19 July, according to the Rev. Timoci Nawaciono, head of the church's Nasea circuit. The church reaffirmed this stance at its annual conference on 11 October, and on 19 October, the church's general secretary, Rev. Ame Tugaue, said that "all Christians" supported the bill. Methodist support was much coveted by the government, as almost two-thirds of indigenous Fijians are affiliated to the denomination.

- Kelepi Lesi, Vice-President of the Catholic League, endorsed the bill in a parliamentary submission on 30 June. His stand was in contrast to that of Archbishop Petero Mataca, who opposed the legislation.

== Other public figures and organizations ==
- Former Chief Justice Sir Timoci Tuivaga spoke cautiously, but said that it could work provided that the various parties involved were willing to make it work.
- Jaiwant Krishna of the Labasa Chamber of Commerce expressed qualified support for the bill. The reconciliation provisions were good, he said, on 13 May. He cautioned, however, that it would work only if implemented in an honest and democratic way.
- Representatives from Lomaiviti Province endorsed the bill on 5 July. Filimone Balaimua, the Roko Tui Lomaiviti (executive head of the Lomaiviti Provincial Council) said that it would lead to reconciliation among all of Fiji's ethnic communities. He added that the council had reservations about some of the amnesty provisions, and would be recommending certain amendments in their submission to Parliament.
- Lawyer Kitione Vuataki said on 10 July that if the Fiji Law Society went ahead with its threatened judicial challenge to the amnesty clauses in the legislation, lawyers who supported the bill might split from the society to form a separate organization. "The Law Society itself will haemorrhage because there are lawyers like me who support the Bill and we have our freedom of association and freedom of speech," Vuataki said. He warned that if the Law Society challenged the bill in the courts, he would likewise consider challenging the Legal Practitioner's Act and the 1997 Constitution. He said that if the Reconciliation, Tolerance, and Unity Bill should be put to a referendum, as the Law Society insists, the same should be required of the Constitution and the Legal Practitioner's Act.

Vuataki said he did not believe in unconditional amnesty, but believed that the proposed law would stanch the "hemorrhaging" of society. "I totally oppose that type of amnesty as was provided for Rabuka's group in the 1990 and 1997 Constitution. However, I favoured amnesty in exchange for hard data to pull the thorn out of a people who are suffering in pain," he said. He likened the bill to a doctor's stethoscope to check a nation whose institutions including the chiefs of the land, the army, police, civil service, judiciary, and the legal profession. were hemorrhaging. "One does not wait for the final heart attack for the nation to collapse," he said.

Vuataki added on 13 July that he had not received any of the five emails that Law Society President Graeme Leung said were sent out to members concerning the legislation, and said that a couple of lawyers who supported the bill were prepared to take the society to court over the issue.

- The women's organization Soqosoqo Vakamarama i Taukei endorsed the bill on 21 July, according to Adi Finau Tabakaucoro, a representative from Tailevu. Speaking in the Suva suburb of Nabua, Tabakaucoro disassociated herself from the anti-bill stand of the National Council of Women (q.v.), and said that the decision of the Soqosoqo Vakamarama to support the bill had been unanimous, a claim that appeared to contradict earlier statements opposing the bill by spokeswoman Ravesi Johnson on 26 May, as well as the presence at the meeting of Adi Koila Nailatikau, an avowed opponent of the legislation.

== See also ==
- Fiji Truth and Reconciliation Commission
- Qualified positions on the bill
- Military opposition to the bill
- Military-church relations in Fiji
- International reaction to the bill
- Church involvement in Fiji coups
