= 2006 Fijian presidential election =

- 8 March 2006
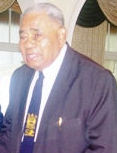
Nominee	Josefa Iloilo
Party	Independent
President before election
Josefa Iloilo
FijiFirst
Elected President
Josefa Iloilo
FijiFirst

Elections to the offices of President and Vice-President of Fiji took place on 8 March 2006, when the Great Council of Chiefs met as an electoral college at the Tradewinds Convention Centre in Lami. The Great Council re-elected President Ratu Josefa Iloilo (who had recently turned 85) and Vice-President Ratu Joni Madraiwiwi to another five-year term.

== Iloilo's retirement plans ==
Speaking on condition of anonymity, a member of President Iloilo's family told the Fiji Times on 29 November 2005 that he did not intend to seek another term when his present term ended on 13 March 2006. The family member said that the President had already hinted of his plans during a speech at the 2005 Fiji Business Excellence Awards in Nadi, in which he said it might be his last official function. His plans to retire were motivated not by concerns about his health, but by his desire to spend more time with his family and tribe, of which he is the Paramount Chief, the source said.

Great Council of Chiefs Chairman Ratu Ovini Bokini said that the Great Council had received no official notice of any retirement plans. The President's official secretary, Rupeni Nacewa, Prime Minister Laisenia Qarase, and Ratu Jeremaia Tavaiqia, a relative of the President, also said that they had not been informed of any such intention.

On 20 December 2005, Commodore Frank Bainimarama, the Commander of Fiji's Military forces, told a parade that President Iloilo would in fact be retiring in 2006. The president's office confirmed on 11 January 2006 that the President did intend to retire in March, following a tour of the Middle East. The Vice President, Ratu Joni Madraiwiwi, who already performs many of the President's official functions, is considered a likely successor. Ratu Ovini Bokini said on 17 January 2006, however, that the Great Council of Chiefs had yet to be notified of any such decision.

== Iloilo reconsiders ==
On 2 February 2006, the office of the Great Council of Chiefs announced that Iloilo had indicated his willingness to serve for another term, defying months of speculation about his imminent retirement. The announcement was welcomed by Rev. Akuila Yabaki of the Citizens Constitutional Forum, a human rights organization. President Iloilo and Vice-President Ratu Joni Madraiwiwi were a "formidable partnership" which gave many citizens a sense of security in a time of uncertainty, Yabaki said.

Military spokesman Captain Neumi Leweni spoke out on 7 February to deny rumours, reported on Radio Gold, that the Military Commander, Commodore Frank Bainimarama, had pressured the President into offering himself for reappointment despite his advanced age and ambiguous health. The Military had not been involved in any way, Leweni said.

National Alliance Party (NAPF) President Ratu Epeli Ganilau, a former Chairman of the Great Council of Chiefs, said on 7 February that the Great Council should be left in peace to make its decision, which should be fully respected, as it was their prerogative to choose the President. Comments from certain individuals, whom he did not identify, had been disrespectful, he said. His sentiments were shared by Pramod Rae, General Secretary of the National Federation Party (NFP), and by Ratu Josateki Nawalowalo, Chairman of the Kadavu Provincial Council, who was quoted by the Fiji Times on 10 February as saying that the chiefs must be allowed to decide the matter, in their wisdom, without interference.

== Military concerns ==
On 10 February, Captain Leweni warned that as the President is constitutionally the Commander-in-Chief of the Military, they would not allow any chief implicated in the 2000 coup to be appointed to this position. The Military reiterated this stance on 16 February, following a Fiji Television report that a prominent chief with links to the 2000 coup was being considered for the post of vice-president. Fiji Village identified this chief as Ratu Jope Seniloli, the former vice-president who resigned in disgrace in November 2004 following his conviction on coup-related offences. Several Tailevu chiefs were reportedly campaigning for his reinstatement.

Great Council of Chiefs Chairman Ratu Ovini Bokini was quoted by Fiji Village on 22 February that the Great Council did not have the authority to reject any nomination. Seniloli himself, however, revealed that he was not eligible for reinstatement, as he was still technically serving his prison sentence extramurally.

Fiji Village reported on 23 February 2006 that some chiefs wished to nominate Ratu Naiqama Lalabalavu, the Tui Cakau (Paramount Chief of Tovata) for the office of President or Vice-President. Lalabalavu, who was also Fiji's Minister for Transport, served an eight-month prison sentence (most of it extramurally) in 2005 for his role in an army mutiny) connected with the coup.

Although the contents were not revealed, the Fiji Sun claimed on 21 February that the Military had sent a seven-page letter to President Iloilo, threatening to invoke the "Doctrine of necessity" if a coup-convict was appointed president or vice-president. The next day, Captain Leweni said that with an incumbent president and vice-president willing to serve for another term, it would be "pointless" to nominate anyone else. Rabukawaqa reiterated this stance on 22 February, but denied knowledge of the seven-page letter alleged to have been sent.

According to Fiji Live, Attorney-General Qoriniasi Bale revealed on 23 February that the Constitution is silent on whether persons convicted of criminal offences are eligible to hold public office.

Fiji Live quoted Rabukawaqa on 24 February as reiterating the Military's opposition to any coup convict being appointed president or vice-president. He strongly criticised Attorney-General Qoriniasi Bale for saying that there was no constitutional bar to an ex-convict holding the Presidency or Vice-Presidency, but denied that the Military had threatened to use the Doctrine of Necessity should such a scenario occur.

In another Fiji Live report on 7 March, Rabukawaqa called on the Military to make a wise choice. "Our concern will be the character and the credibility of the nominations of the people who will actually sit in the office of the President and the Vice President," Rabukawaqa said. No person who would bring the office into disrepute should be chosen, he insisted. He refused, however, to say what the Military might do if a coup-convict were to be appointed, saying that he would not comment on hypothetical scenarios. His comments followed a call the previous day from the Prime Minister to respect the rule of law and avoid interfering in the selection of the president and vice-president. Laisenia Qarase said that he himself would not attempt to influence the decision, even though he was constitutionally entitled to be consulted.

== Others' comments ==
The Military was not the only institution expressing misgivings about the election. Soqosoqo ni Vakavulewa ni Taukei (SVT) General Secretary Ema Druavesi said on 16 February that she would not be surprised if Seniloli returned to office, as numerous coup-convicts had already been reinstated in the positions they had held. She alleged that Seniloli's possible return was part of a government campaign against the Military – and should be ready to answer for it.

Poseci Bune, Deputy Leader of the Fiji Labour Party (FLP), similarly claimed that there were moves to replace President Iloilo with a pro-Government chief who would remove Commodore Frank Bainimarama from his position as Commander of the Republic of Fiji Military Forces. Prime Minister Laisenia Qarase, however, rejected Bune's claims as outrageous, saying that the government would not interfere with the decision of the Great Council of Chiefs.

In a further comment quoted in the Fiji Times (26 February), Ratu Epeli Ganilau said that the Great Council of Chiefs already had selection criteria, which were adopted in 1992. While the Constitution allowed any Fijian citizen, in principle, to hold the Presidency or Vice-Presidency, the criteria of the Great Council required the person chosen to be of chiefly birth, experienced, and well regarded as a national leader. "Also, the person appointed must not be convicted of any crime at all," Ganilau declared. President Iloilo and Vice-President Madraiwiwi had both been selected on the basis of these criteria, Ganilau said. He claimed to have met, in his then capacity as Chairman of the Great Council of Chiefs, former Vice-President Seniloli following his treason conviction, with a view to protecting the office.

Asesela Sadole, General Secretary of the Great Council of Chiefs, responded on 28 February by saying that it was the Great Council that had established the selection criteria, and was at liberty to change it. It was only a guideline, he said.

Party of National Unity (PANU) leader Ponipate Lesavua endorsed Iloilo on 27 February and called on the chiefs of Ba and Burebasaga to rally behind him. He hoped that in making their selection, the chiefs would consider that no country should be ruled by ex-convicts. "We need clean and honest people running the nation so our chiefs should give them (Iloilo and Madraiwiwi) a second chance rather than choosing those people that have come out of jail for offences that could be described to be similar to murder," the Fiji Times quoted him as saying.

Although endorsing Iloilo for president and Madraiwiwi for vice-president, Fiji Labour Party (FLP) leader Mahendra Chaudhry told Fiji Live on 5 March that a magnanimous gesture would be to appoint a non-indigenous Fijian to one of the two most senior positions. He also declared his opposition to any coup-convict being given one of the positions. "It's a great challenge to the integrity of our nation," he said.
