= Naiqama Lalabalavu =

President of Fiji since 2024

The Honourable Ratu Naiqama Lalabalavu MBE
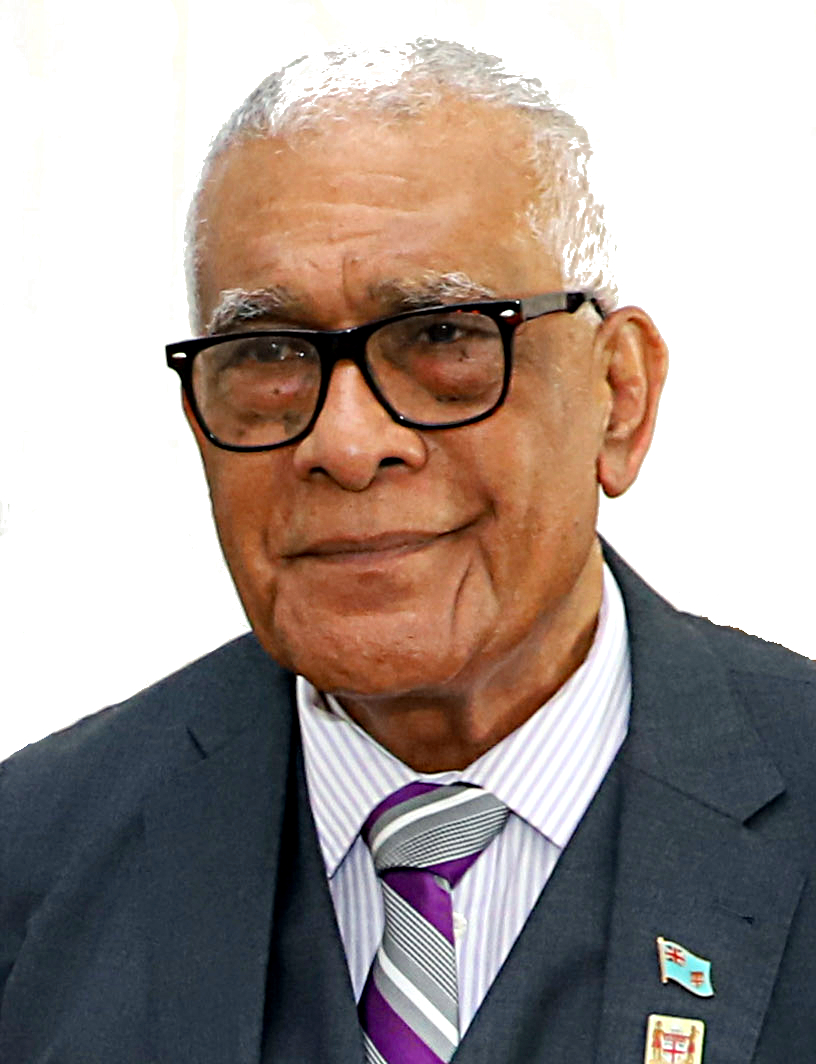
- Lalabalavu in 2026

7th President of Fiji
- Incumbent
- Assumed office 12 November 2024
- Prime Minister: Sitiveni Rabuka
- Preceded by: Wiliame Katonivere

3rd Speaker of Parliament
- In office 24 December 2022 – 12 November 2024
- Prime Minister: Sitiveni Rabuka
- Preceded by: Epeli Nailatikau
- Succeeded by: Filimoni Jitoko

Leader of the Opposition
- In office 8 December 2020 – 24 December 2022
- Prime Minister: Frank Bainimarama
- Preceded by: Sitiveni Rabuka
- Succeeded by: Frank Bainimarama

Member of Parliament
- In office 17 September 2014 – 8 December 2020
- Preceded by: Office established

Member of The Fiji House of Representatives
- In office May 1999 – December 2006
- Preceded by: Ratu Inoke Kubuabola
- Succeeded by: Office abolished
- Constituency: Lau Taveuni Rotuma; Until 2009; Cakaudrove East; Until Coup d'état

Personal details
- Born: 23 December 1953 (age 72)
- Party: SVT (1999-2001); CAMV (2001-2006); Soqosoqo Duavata ni Lewenivanua (2006); SODELPA (2014-2024)
- Spouse: Emily Lalabalavu
- Children: Ratu Atonio Rabici Lalabalavu
- Education: Clark University (MIA), Harvard University (Attended)
- Profession: Politician
- Portfolio: Minister of Fijian Affairs

Ratu Naiqama Tawakecolati Lalabalavu MBE (Fijian pronunciation: [naiŋɡama taɰakeðolatʃi lalambalaβu]; born 23 December 1953) is a Fijian Paramount Chief and the current President of Fiji. He has served as the leader of the opposition and as Speaker of the Parliament of Fiji.

He was appointed a Member of the Order of the British Empire (MBE) in the 1981 Birthday Honours for public and community service.

On 31 October 2024 he was elected President of Fiji; he took office on 12 November 2024.

== Tui Cakau ==
In 1999, Lalabalavu succeeded his late father, Ratu Glanville Lalabalavu, as the Tui Cakau, or Paramount Chief of Cakaudrove and of the Tovata Confederacy, one of three confederacies to which all Fijian tribes belong. He was challenged in court by Ratu Epeli Ganilau, son of former Fijian President Ratu Sir Penaia Ganilau who had himself held the Tui Cakau title prior to his death in 1993, but in 2001, the Supreme Court ruled in favour of Lalabalavu.

He is a convert to Roman Catholicism.

Lalabalavu is the father of SODELPA Member of Parliament Dr Ratu Atonio Lalabalavu.

== Political career ==
Lalabalavu was elected to represent the Lau-Taveuni-Rotuma Open Constituency in the House of Representatives in 1999 as a candidate of the ruling Soqosoqo ni Vakavulewa ni Taukei (SVT), one of only 8 SVT candidates to win seats. He defeated his chiefly rival, Ratu Epeli Ganilau of the Christian Democratic Alliance, by a margin of 58 per cent to 32 per cent.

Lalabalavu was appointed Minister for Fijian Affairs by George Speight during the 2000 Fijian coup d'état.

By the time the 2001 election was held to restore democracy, some major political realignments had taken place. Now a leading member of the Conservative Alliance, a nationalistic party which included many supporters and associates of George Speight, the chief instigator of the 2000 coup, Lalabalavu won the Cakaudrove East Fijian Communal Constituency, one of 23 reserved for ethnic Fijians in the House of Representatives. In the coalition government that was subsequently formed, Lalabalavu was appointed Minister of Lands and Mineral Resources. The appointment was later harshly criticised by Senator Adi Koila Nailatikau, daughter of former President Ratu Sir Kamisese Mara, who had been deposed in the coup. She accused him of having ordered the burning of the Matailakeba Cane Farm in Seaqaqa (owned by Ratu Mara) in the midst of an army mutiny at Sukanaivalu Barracks in Labasa on July 29, 2000.

On 6 April 2003, it was reported that Lalabalavu had called for an overhaul of the country's constitutional institutions. Political authority, he said, should be returned to Fiji's chiefs. He said that as it was the chiefs who ceded the islands to the United Kingdom in 1874, paramount authority should have been returned to them when independence was granted in 1970. As a first step, he proposed the abolition of the Senate, the functions of which could be taken over by the Great Council of Chiefs, he said. He opined that restoring the authority of the chiefs would lead to a breaking down of Fiji's race barriers, as the chiefs would then be the leaders not only of the indigenous people, but of all races. His proposal was rejected by Ratu Epeli Ganilau, who was then the Chairman of the Great Council.

He was the Minister for Lands and Minister for Mineral Resources in the Cabinet of Prime Minister Laisenia Qarase, but was forced to resign after being convicted of unlawful assembly and jailed for his actions during the coup. He was subsequently released under a compulsory supervision order, having served only 11 days of his eight month sentence.

The Fiji Village news service reported on 23 February 2006 that some chiefs wished to nominate Lalabalavu for the office of President or Vice-President in the 2006 presidential election. When the Great Council of Chiefs met on 8 March, however, it reelected unopposed Ratu Josefa Iloilo and Ratu Joni Madraiwiwi as President and Vice-President, respectively.

Following the parliamentary election held on 6–13 May 2006, he became Minister for Fijian Affairs again, as well as Minister for Lands and Provincial Development. He was deposed in December 2006 by the 2006 Fijian coup d'état.

== Post-coup career ==
Lalabalavu ran as a candidate for the Social Democratic Liberal Party in the 2014 election, winning 6668 votes, the 6th highest-polling candidate. Following the election he was appointed Shadow Minister for Lands and Mineral Resources.

In May 2015, Lalabalavu was referred to the privileges committee for making derogatory comments about Speaker of Parliament Dr Jiko Luveni at a constituency meeting. He was suspended from Parliament for two years. On July 15, 2015, Ratu Naiqama launched a constitutional challenge, heard by Chief Justice Anthony Gates, against Speaker Jiko Luveni and Attorney General Aiyaz Sayed-Khaiyum for his suspension. The case was argued in September 2015, but the suspension expired before a decision was made.

In June 2015, Lalabalavu was elected as SODELPA president. He was re-elected in June 2017.

Lalabalavu had planned to retire from politics, but changed his mind and stood for re-election in the 2018 elections. He was elected, winning 2,165 votes.

On 22 October 2024, he was nominated by the People’s Alliance for the presidency of Fiji. On 31 October he was elected president in the 2024 Fijian presidential election, defeating Meli Tora 37 votes to 16. He was sworn in on 12 November.

Political offices
Preceded by Ratu Glanville Lalabalavu	Tui Cakau; 1999–	Succeeded by Incumbent
Preceded by Sitiveni Rabuka	Leader of the Opposition; 2020–2022	Succeeded by Frank Bainimarama
