= 2000 Fijian presidential election =

- 18 July 2000
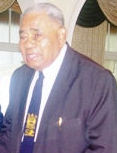
Nominee	Josefa Iloilo
Party	Independent
President before election
Kamisese Mara
Alliance
Elected President
Josefa Iloilo
FijiFirst

A Presidential election took place in Fiji on 18 July 2000, to replace Ratu Sir Kamisese Mara, who had resigned, possibly under pressure from the Military, during the Fiji coup of 2000. The Great Council of Chiefs, an assembly of mostly hereditary chiefs which is constitutionally empowered to elect the President, chose the Tui Vuda (Paramount Chief of Vuda), Ratu Josefa Iloilovatu Uluivuda (commonly known simply as Ratu Josefa Iloilo), who had been Vice-President under Mara, to succeed him. Iloilo had already exercised Presidential duties since 13 July, when the Military had asked him to take over the office.

One of his earliest acts as President was to reappoint Laisenia Qarase, who had been chosen by the Military in July, as Prime Minister on 10 September 2000.

== See also ==
- Fiji
- 1999 Fijian general election
