= Lau Taveuni Rotuma (Open Constituency, Fiji) =

Former electoral division of Fiji

Lau Taveuni Rotuma Open is a former electoral division of Fiji, one of 25 open constituencies that were elected by universal suffrage (the remaining 46 seats, called communal constituencies, were allocated by ethnicity). Established by the 1997 Constitution, it came into being in 1999 and was used for the parliamentary elections of 1999, 2001, and 2006. The electorate covered the Lau Islands, Taveuni and some of its outliers including Rabi Island and Kioa, and the remote dependency of Rotuma.

The 2013 Constitution promulgated by the Military-backed interim government abolished all constituencies and established a form of proportional representation, with the entire country voting as a single electorate.

== Election results ==
In the following tables, the primary vote refers to first-preference votes cast. The final vote refers to the final tally after votes for low-polling candidates have been progressively redistributed to other candidates according to pre-arranged electoral agreements (see electoral fusion), which may be customized by the voters (see instant run-off voting).

=== 1999 ===
| Candidate | Political party | Votes | % |
| Ratu Naiqama Lalabalavu | Soqosoqo ni Vakavulewa ni Taukei (SVT) | 7,911 | 57.96 |
| Ratu Epeli Ganilau | Christian Democratic Alliance (VLV) | 4,423 | 32.41 |
| Adi Senimili Tuivanuavou | Fijian Association Party (FAP) | 1,099 | 8.05 |
| Waisea Qoronalau | Nationalist Vanua Tako Lavo Party (NVTLP) | 215 | 1.58 |
| Total | | 13,648 | 100.00 |

=== 2001 ===
| Candidate | Political party | Votes | % |
| Savenaca Uluibau Draunidalo | Independent | 7,081 | 56.38 |
| Kini Marawai | Conservative Alliance (CAMV) | 2,849 | 22.68 |
| Seru Buliruarua | Soqosoqo ni Vakavulewa ni Taukei (SVT) | 2,630 | 20.94 |
| Total | | 12,560 | 100.00 |

=== 2006 ===
| Candidate | Political party | Votes | % |
| Savenaca Uluibau Draunidalo | Soqosoqo Duavata ni Lewenivanua (SDL) | 10,888 | 78.52 |
| Fani Tago Vosaniveibuli | National Alliance Party (NAPF) | 2,553 | 18.41 |
| Ratu Pio Naiqama | Independent | 223 | 1.61 |
| Ilisoni Taoba | Independent | 204 | 1.47 |
| Total | | 13,868 | 100.00 |

== Sources ==
- Psephos - Adam Carr's electoral archive
- Fiji Facts
