= Seruvakula =

Seruvakula is a surname. Notable people with the surname include:

- Semi Seruvakula (died 2018), Fijian chief and politician
- Viliame Seruvakula, Fijian military officer
