= 2000 presidential election =

2000 presidential election may refer to:

- 2000 Federal Republic of Yugoslavia presidential election
- 2000 Fijian presidential election
- 2000 Finnish presidential election
- 2000 Ghanaian presidential election
- 2000 Mexican general election (includes a presidential election)
- 2000 Polish presidential election
- 2000 Taiwan (Republic of China) presidential election
- 2000 Romanian presidential election
- 2000 Russian presidential election
- 2000 Senegalese presidential election
- 2000 Turkish presidential election
- 2000 United States presidential election
- 2000 Uzbekistani presidential election
- 2000 Venezuelan presidential election
