= Inoke Takiveikata (vice president) =

Vice-President of Fiji

Ratu Inoke Takiveikata is a Fijian politician who served two non-consecutive terms in the 1990s as one of two vice presidents of Fiji.

His first term of office, which he shared with Ratu Sir Josaia Tavaiqia, was from 1990 to 2 June 1992, when he stepped down in favour of Ratu Sir Kamisese Mara. His second term, during which he shared the office initially with Tavaiqia and later with Ratu Josefa Iloilo, ran from 12 January 1994 to 18 January 1999, when Iloilo assumed the office on his own.

Takiveikata was a chief from Lasakau on the island of Bau.

He is not to be confused with another Ratu Inoke Takiveikata, who was also a politician, who in 2004 was convicted of offences connected with an army mutiny that followed the 2000 coup.
