= Ovini Bokini =

Ratu Ovini Bokini Ratu (3 November 1944 – 15 January 2009) was a Fijian chief and political leader. Bokini, who held the chiefly title of Tui Tavua, succeeded Ratu Epeli Ganilau as Chairman of the Great Council of Chiefs on 21 July 2004, and was re-elected to this post for a full three-year term on 27 July 2005.

A formal gathering of mostly traditional chiefs chosen by the country's 14 provincial councils, along with some appointees of the national government and the Council of Rotuma, the Great Council of Chiefs functioned as an electoral college to select Fiji's President, along with 14 of the 32 members of the Senate. Informally, the Council advised the Fijian government on every aspect of political life. Although not mandated by the Constitution, the chairman's role was therefore a very influential one.

During late April 2007, all members of G.C.C were suspended by the Interim Prime Minister, Frank Bainimarama. The suspension included the chairman, Ovini Bokini and all other members of G.C.C after the President's nomination for the Vice-President position was rejected by some G.C.C members.

== Unusual appointment ==
Bokini was chosen to fill this position after his predecessor, Ratu Epeli Ganilau, had become embroiled in political controversy, calling for the resignation of the then-Vice-President, Jope Seniloli (who has since been convicted of treason for his role in the coup d'état that deposed the elected government in 2000), and proposing the revival of the country's former ruling political party, the Alliance Party, as a multi-racial party, hinting that he would play a role in it. Many politicians feared that Ganilau was compromising the neutrality of the Council, and it is thought that government pressure played a role in the decision of the Cakaudrove Provincial Council to replace him as their representative with someone less controversial. Without membership of the Council, Ganilau was ineligible to serve as its chairman.

The sentencing of Vice-President Seniloli to four years' imprisonment for treason on 6 August 2004 created fears of a possible power vacuum should anything happen to the ailing 83-year-old President, Josefa Iloilo. Constitutional experts, however, said that as Chairman of the Great Council of Chiefs, Bokini could choose to assume the role of Vice-President in an interim capacity. Seniloli resigned on 29 November, paving the way for President Iloilo to nominate, and the Great Council to approve, Joni Madraiwiwi as the new Vice-President on 15 December.

== Position on the Unity Bill ==
On 18 May 2005, Bokini complained that the Great Council of Chiefs had not been consulted, or even officially informed, about the government's controversial legislation to establish a Reconciliation and Unity Commission with the power, subject to presidential approval, to compensate victims and pardon perpetrators of the 2000 coup. Attempts by the Great Council to obtain a copy of the bill for study and discussion had come to nothing, he said. On 30 May, in a speech to mark Ratu Sukuna Day in honour of Fiji's first modern statesman, Lala Sukuna, he cautioned that reconciliation was not something that could be forced or one-sided. "It must be allowed to grow through a shared understanding of what we all want and where we are all heading," he said. Only with good leadership and the support and goodwill of other ethnic groups could indigenous Fijians seriously negotiate about what to give and what to take – a process that would take time and patience. He proposed the Fijian language as a common bond to unite Fiji's diverse ethnic communities, saying that especially in rural areas, Fijian was widely used as a common language.

Later, however, he came out strongly in favour of the Unity Bill.

== 2006 coup d'état ==
Bokini condemned the 2006 Fijian coup d'état, which overthrew the government of Prime Minister Laisenia Qarase. Bokini said that the Great Council of Chiefs would refuse to recognise the interim government appointed by the Republic of Fiji Military Forces. He angrily denounced his predecessor, Epeli Ganilau, who claimed to sympathise with the motives though not the method of the coup, for claiming to be mediating between the Great Council of Chiefs and the Military. "I never made a request to meet the commander. Whoever said that is lying. I don't intend to see the commander. He has to make a request to me if he wants to meet me," Bokini declared. On 7 December 300 villagers blocked the entrance to Tavualevu Village, in response to a rumour that the military was coming to arrest Bokini, a rumour the army quickly denied.

== Background and career ==
Bokini hailed from the village of Tavualevu and held the chiefly title of Tui Tavua, as Paramount Chief of the Tavua District of Ba Province. He was the son of Ratu Etuate Bokini and Sereima Lalavanua. He held various positions of employment in the Fiji Sugar Corporation before joining Fiji's House of Representatives. He was a member of the House of Representatives in the 1990s, and also served in the Cabinet, holding a variety of portfolios. In addition to chairing the Great Council of Chiefs, he has also served as Chairman of the Ba Provincial Council.

Bokini was married to Tavo Bokini, with whom he had four children. He died on 15 January 2009 at his home in Tavua.

Preceded by Ratu Epeli Ganilau	Chairman of the Great Council of Chiefs; 2004-Mid April 2007	Succeeded by Frank Bainimarama
