= Ministry of iTaukei Affairs (Fiji) =

Government ministry of Fiji

- Coat of arms of Fiji

Agency overview
- Jurisdiction: Republic of Fiji
- Ministers responsible: Ifereimi Vasu, Minister for iTaukei Affairs; Isikeli Tuiwailevu, Assistant Minister for Itaukei Affairs
- Website: itaukeiaffairs.gov.fj

The Ministry of iTaukei Affairs is a Ministry of Fiji responsible for the preservation of Fijian culture and the economic and social development of indigenous Fijians. The current Minister for iTaukei Affairs is Ifereimi Vasu.

== Responsibilities ==
The Ministry is tasked in formulating government policies and programs focused entirely on the indigenous population. The Ministry provides a direct link between government, iTaukei institutions and its administration across the fourteen provinces. Through its institutes, it keeps official records relating to iTaukei land, fishing grounds, headship titles, traditional knowledge and expressions of culture.

The Ministry is also tasked to deal with disputes over land, fishing grounds, chiefly and traditional headship titles. The Ministry also formulate advocacy programmes to safeguard the language and culture of the iTaukei.

== Government Agencies ==
- Itaukei Affairs Board
- Itaukei Fisheries and Lands Commission
- Itaukei Land Trust Board

== See also ==
- Fijians
