= Blue Ribbon campaign =

Blue Ribbon campaign may refer to:

- Blue Ribbon Online Free Speech Campaign—an international, online campaign for freedom of expression on the Internet, orchestrated by the Electronic Frontier Foundation in the mid-1990s through early 2000s
- Blue Ribbon Campaign Against Child Abuse—a US-based, mostly offline ribbon campaign against child abuse in late 1990s
- Blue Ribbon campaign (Fiji)—controversial legislation proposed by the Fijian government to establish a Reconciliation and Unity Commission.

For other uses of blue ribbons, see blue ribbon.

- Blue Ribbon campaign (Myanmar) Academics from Myanmar Technological and Computer Universities protest against the career promotion rules applied by the Ministry of Education, which they claim are opaque and arbitrary.
