= Nationalist Vanua Tako Lavo Party =

- Leader: Iliesa Duvuloco
- President: Viliame Savu
- Founded: 1999
- Dissolved: 2013
- Merger of: Fijian Nationalist Party; Vanua Tako Lavo Party
- Headquarters: Suva, Fiji
- Ideology: Christian nationalism; Christian right; Fijian nationalism; Social conservatism; Until 2006: Anti-Indian sentiment
- Political position: Right-wing to far-right

The Nationalist Vanua Tako Lavo Party (NVTLP) was a Fijian political party which championed Fijian ethnic nationalism. It was led by Iliesa Duvuloco, while Viliame Savu served as the party's president.

== Founding and ideology ==
The party was founded in the late 1990s by a merger of Sakeasi Butadroka's Fijian Nationalist Party and Iliesa Duvuloco's Vanua Tako Lavo Party. Both leaders strongly opposed the adoption of the present constitution, which they publicly burnt when Parliament passed it. The party campaigned on a platform of "Fiji for the Fijians and that their rights at all times should be preserved," as Butadroka put it.

In April 2006, party secretary Viliame Savu announced that the NVTLP was dropping its demand for the expulsion of ethnic Indians who were born in Fiji. "We no longer share that view now because if you Indian or European born here, you will be still a Fiji citizen," he told the Fiji Sun. The party would continue to fight for indigenous rights, however, and would continue to campaign for Christianity to be established as the official religion of Fiji.

== The Fiji coup of 2000 ==
A number of senior figures from the NVTLP, including Duvuloco and the party executive, Samuela Konataci, have been convicted of offenses related to the Fiji coup of 2000 and have served prison sentences. On 21 September 2005, Maciu Navakasuasua, a former NVTLP stalwart who was imprisoned for three years for his role in the coup, went public with allegations that the coup was actually planned by the NVTLP and that George Speight, who fronted the rebellion, was only a spokesman who usurped its leadership. Duvuloco refused to comment on the allegations, saying that he thought the country should look forward rather than backward. However, the party President, Viliame Savu, supported Navakasuasua's version of events, saying that he was admitting the party's role in the coup in order to clear his conscience.

== Towards 2006 ==
- See main article: Fiji election of 2006.

In August 2005, the NVTLP joined the Grand Coalition Initiative Group, an electoral coalition of five political parties led and supported mostly by indigenous Fijians, to contest the election due in 2006. All parties participating in the coalition would share "preferences" under Fiji's instant run-off voting system, which allows votes to be transferred from low-polling candidates to higher polling-candidates, according to a ranking of "preferences" specified by the candidates, though voters may customize the ranking. The party has expressed confidence that the election will unite the people of Fiji. Konataci said that some candidates of the NVTLP would probably be women.

Party leader Iliesa Duvuloco complained on 12 April that some 30 NVTLP candidates had been disqualified because they could not afford to pay the F$500 deposit required by the Elections Office, in lieu of the 250 signatures from electors they had failed to collect. Claiming that most indigenous Fijians were poor, Duvuloco was quoted in the Fiji Sun as saying that the required deposit was an injustice.

=== Calls for all land to be returned ===
On 6 March 2006, Radio New Zealand quoted Duvuloco as calling for all freehold land to be restored to indigenous landowners. He also condemned the present Constitution, which he called a betrayal of the Fijian people. In a separate report, the Daily Post newspaper quoted him as saying that former Vice-President Ratu Jope Seniloli should be appointed President, at the Great Council of Chiefs meeting on 8 March. He saw Seniloli, who resigned the Vice-Presidency in November 2004 in disgrace following his conviction on coup-related offences, as providing the "good strong leadership" which Fiji needed.

=== Election result ===
The party did not win any seats in the 2006 election.

== 2006 coup and aftermath ==
In 2009 party leader Iliesa Duvuloco was arrested for breaching the military regime's emergency laws by distributing pamphlets calling for an uprising against the military regime.

In January 2013 the military regime promulgated new regulations governing the registration of political parties, requiring all parties to have at least 5,000 members. All existing parties had to re-register under the new regulations. The party was not one of the two to re-register, and as a result was wound up and its assets were forfeited to the state.
