= Iliesa Duvuloco =

Fijian politician

Iliesa Duvuloco (c.1948 – 1 September 2017) was a real estate businessman and a former Fijian politician and leader of the Nationalist Vanua Tako Lavo Party. He was involved in the 2000 coup d'état and jailed for 18 months.

Duvuloco formed the Nationalist Vanua Tako Lavo Party in 1999 through a merger of his own Vanua Tako Lavo Party and Sakeasi Butadroka's Fijian Nationalist Party, both of which championed ethnic nationalism and indigenous Fijian political supremacy.

Duvuloco supported the controversial 2006 Reconciliation, Tolerance, and Unity Bill, which proposed to establish a Commission empowered to compensate victims and pardon perpetrators of the 2000 coup which deposed the elected government of Prime Minister Mahendra Chaudhry in May 2000. He has refused to comment on allegations made by Maciu Navakasuasua, who was convicted of coup-related offences, that he was a party to the planning of the coup.

In April 2009 Duvuloco was one of five men arrested for breaching the military regime's emergency regulations by distributing pamphlets calling for an uprising against the military regime. He was subsequently hospitalised after this arrest.
