= Cakaudrove East (Fijian Communal Constituency, Fiji) =

Former electoral division of Fiji

Cakaudrove East Fijian Provincial Communal is a former electoral division of Fiji, one of 23 communal constituencies reserved for indigenous Fijians. Established by the 1997 Constitution, it came into being in 1999 and was used for the parliamentary elections of 1999, 2001, and 2006. (Of the remaining 48 seats, 23 were reserved for other ethnic communities, and 25, called Open Constituencies, were elected by universal suffrage). The electorate covered eastern areas of Cakaudrove Province; it included south-eastern Vanua Levu and the nearby islands of Taveuni, Rabi, and Kioa.

The 2013 Constitution promulgated by the Military-backed interim government abolished all constituencies and established a form of proportional representation, with the entire country voting as a single electorate.

== Election results ==
In the following tables, the primary vote refers to first-preference votes cast. The final vote refers to the final tally after votes for low-polling candidates have been progressively redistributed to other candidates according to pre-arranged electoral agreements (see electoral fusion), which may be customized by the voters (see instant run-off voting).

=== 1999 ===
Candidate	Political party	Votes	%
Ratu Inoke Kubuabola	Soqosoqo ni Vakavulewa ni Taukei (SVT)	5,135	78.66
Ratu Inoke Tabualevu	Christian Democratic Alliance (VLV)	1,099	16.84
Josua Gabirieli	(UNLP)	294	4.50
Total		6,528	100.00

=== 2001 ===
Candidate	Political party	Votes	%
Ratu Naiqama Lalabalavu	Conservative Alliance (CAMV)	3,278	56.09
Ratu Inoke Kubuabola	Soqosoqo ni Vakavulewa ni Taukei (SVT)	1,742	29.81
Ratu Josefa Lului	Soqosoqo Duavata ni Lewenivanua (SDL)	824	14.10
Total		5,844	100.00

=== 2006 ===
Candidate	Political party	Votes	%
Ratu Naiqama Lalabalavu	Soqosoqo Duavata ni Lewenivanua (SDL)	6,120	88.86
Melania Lutuvakula	National Alliance Party (NAPF)	480	6.97
Vilimone Vosarogo	Independent	287	4.17
Total		6,887	100.00

== Sources ==
- Psephos - Adam Carr's electoral archive
- Fiji Facts
