= Josefa Lalabalavu =

Ratu Josefa Lalabalavu
- 9th Tui Cakau; Paramount Chief of Cakaudrove Province; Fiji
- Born: 1860; Somosomo, Taveuni, Fiji
- Died: 10 June 1905 (aged 44–45); Somosomo, Taveuni, Fiji
- Spouse: 1st Adi Furi; 2nd Tupou Moheofo
- Father: Ratu Goleanavanua
- Mother: Adi Elenoa Mila

Ratu Josefa Lalabalavu (1860 – 1905) was the 9th Tui Cakau from 1879 to 1905. He was the Paramount Chief of the Cakaudrove Province in Fiji. He was the son of Ratu Goleanavanua and father of Ratu Glanville Wellington Lalabalavu.

== Early life ==
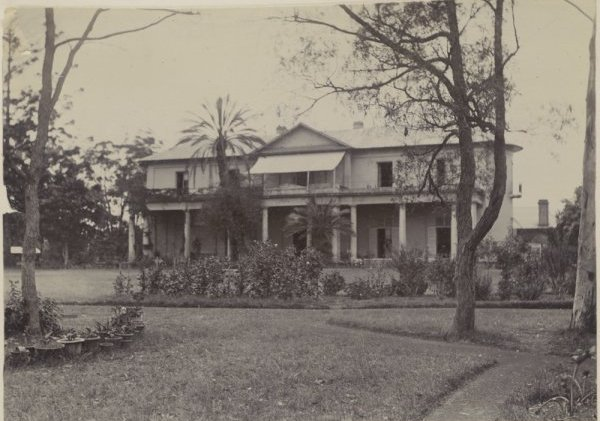
Lalabalavu attended Newington College at Newington House on the Parramatta River at Silverwater.

Lalabalavu was born in Somosomo, Taveuni, Fiji, to Ratu Goleanavanua and Adi Elenoa Mila in 1860. When his father, the 8th Tui Cakau, was dying he was committed to the care of Sir John Bates Thurston, then Britain's honorary consul in Fiji.

Like Ratu Josefa Celua, the youngest son of Ratu Seru Epenisa Cakobau, King of Fiji, Lalabalavu was enrolled at Newington College in Sydney, Australia, in 1874. After schooling in Australia he returned to Fiji and Thurston’s household.

== Installation ==
Lalabalavu was officially installed as Tui Cakau in August 1880 in the presence of Arthur Hamilton-Gordon, 1st Baron Stanmore, Governor of Fiji as reported by the Fiji Times and The Sydney Morning Herald.

== Later life ==
After visiting Sir Willian Clarke in Melbourne in July 1879, The Australasian reported that; “he has adopted English dress, and his tastes and general mode of life are decidedly English. It is said that his influence with the natives has suffered on that account, but the deference paid to him by his people is not less than that paid to chiefs who have followed the old models closely. His knowledge is extensive, and his conversation, especially when he is dealing with the flora of his native land, most interesting. The article said that; he keeps up two establishments, a native house in the village of Somosomo, Taveuni, where his wife, the daughter of a Tongan chief, resides with her family, and & wooden building, with wide verandahs, in which he accommodates his European guests.”
