= Tui Cakau =

Paramount chief of Cakaudrove Province, Fiji

The Tui Cakau (Fijian pronunciation: [tui ðakau]) is the Paramount Chief of Cakaudrove Province in Fiji.

== Recent history ==
The current Tui Cakau is Ratu Naiqama Lalabalavu; he was installed on 8 May 2001 in succession to his father, Ratu Glanville Lalabalavu, who died in 1999. In April 2002, the courts dismissed a challenge from a rival claimant, Ratu Epeli Ganilau.

Perhaps the best-known Tui Cakau in modern times was Ratu Sir Penaia Ganilau, who held the title from 1988 to 1993. He was Fiji's last Governor-General and first President. The present Tui Cakau, Ratu Naiqama Lalabalavu, led a political party, the Conservative Alliance (CAMV) and was a Minister in the government of Prime Minister Laisenia Qarase from 2000 to 2005, when he was convicted of involvement in the coup d'état that deposed the elected government in 2000. On 3 April he became the first-ever Cabinet Minister to be imprisoned while in office, and resigned from the Cabinet four days later. He was released on 14 April, to serve the remainder of his eight-month sentence extramurally. He is the highest-ranked chief in modern times to have been imprisoned.

Following his release, Lalabalavu was reinstated as a Cabinet Minister. The CAMV merged with Prime Minister Qarase's Soqosoqo Duavata ni Lewenivanua (SDL) ahead of the 2006 elections, and Lalabalavu remained in both Parliament and the Cabinet until a military coup deposed the government on 5 December 2006. He returned to Parliament at the 2014 elections as a candidate of the Social Democratic Liberal Party (SDLP), the successor to the SDL.

== A brief history ==
The Tui Cakau ruled what was effectively an independent state until 1865, when Cakaudrove joined the Confederacy of Independent Kingdoms of Viti under the chairmanship of Seru Epenisa Cakobau, the Vunivalu of Bau. This lasted only until 1867, when the Confederacy was split into two units, the Kingdom of Bau (ruled by Cakobau) and the Tovata Confederacy (consisting of the present-day provinces of Cakaudrove, Bua, Macuata and Lau). The Tovata Confederacy was headed by the Tui Lau,Enele Ma'afu, who reigned until the Tovata Confederacy joined the united Kingdom of Viti in 1871.

== Title holders ==
Order	Tui Cakau	Reigned	Lived
1.	Rokevu	unknown
2.	Ratu Ratavo		unknown
3.	Ratu Vakamino		unknown
4.	Ratu Naiqama	? - c.1829	? - c.1829
4.	Ratu Yavala	c.1829 - 1845	? - 1845 (Buli mai Vuna)
5.	Ratu Ralulu	1845	? - 1845
6.	Ratu Tuikiakila	1845 - 1854	? - 1854
7.	Ratu Raivalita	1854 - 1862	? - 1862
8.	Ratu Goleanavanua	1862 - 1879	? - 1879
9.	Ratu Josefa Lalabalavu	1879 - 1905	1860 - 1905
10.	Ratu Joni Antonio Rabici	1905 - 1925	? - 1925
11.	Ratu Glanville Wellington Lalabalavu	1925 - 1946	? - 1946
12.	Ratu Josefa Ratavo Lalabalavu	? - ?
13.	Ratu Sir Penaia Ganilau	1988 - 1993	28 July 1918 - 15 December 1993
14.	Ratu Glanville Lalabalavu	1993 - 1999	1929 - 29 October 1999
15.	Ratu Naiqama Lalabalavu	8 May 2001 – present	...
