= Epeli Ganilau =

Fijian military officer and politician (1951–2023)

Brigadier-General Ratu Epeli Ganilau, MC, MSD, (10 October 1951 – 23 March 2023) was a Fijian military officer and politician. His career previously encompassed such roles as Commander of the Fiji Military Forces and Chairman of the Bose Levu Vakaturaga (Great Council of Chiefs). On 15 January 2007 he was sworn in as Minister for Fijian Affairs in the interim Cabinet formed in the wake of the 2006 Fijian coup d'état which deposed the Qarase government on 5 December 2006.

== Early life ==
Ganilau was educated at Wanganui Collegiate School, in New Zealand, from 1965. He later graduated from the University of the South Pacific and from the Royal Military Academy, Sandhurst, England, and the Royal New Zealand Air Force Staff College.

== Military career ==
He enlisted in the Royal Fiji Military Forces in June 1972, and attended the Royal Military Academy Sandhurst in the UK. He had served several tours of duty with the UN forces in Lebanon (UNIFIL) and with the Multinational Force & Observers (MFO) in Sinai, Egypt. In 1979, as a company commander with the Fijian battalion serving with UN forces in Lebanon (1st Battalion, Fiji Infantry Regiment) Ganilau was awarded the Military Cross (MC) for his leadership on operations at a time when UN forces and the Fijian battalion in particular, was being frequently attacked by armed groups in southern Lebanon. He attended the RNZAF Staff College in Auckland, NZ, and rose through the ranks to attain the rank of Brigadier. In July 1991, he was appointed Commander of the Military, succeeding Sitiveni Rabuka. He held this office for eight years, retiring in 1999 to pursue a career in politics.

== First foray into politics ==
In 1998, he helped to found the Christian Democratic Alliance, which won three seats in the House of Representatives in the 1999 election, although he personally was not elected. He chose not to run in the 2001 elections. He also contested the traditional title of Tui Cakau in 2001 which was vacant at the time. Ratu Naiqama Lalabalavu succeeded to the title of Tui Cakau, the Paramount Chief of the Tovata Confederacy which encompasses the provinces of Cakaudrove and Lau.

== Chairman of the Great Council of Chiefs ==
Ganilau was appointed to the Bose Levu Vakaturaga (Great Council of Chiefs) in 1999 as one of six representatives of the Fijian government. Ganilau was elected chairman on 3 May 2001 after his predecessor, Sitiveni Rabuka, stepped down amid accusations that he (Rabuka) may have been involved in the George Speight-led ethno-nationalist coup that deposed Fiji's elected government in May 2000. The Bose Levu Vakaturaga was a formal assembly of Fijian hereditary chiefs, along with a number of specially qualified commoners, chosen mainly by Fiji's provincial councils. The Council of Chiefs also had a constitutional role in functioning as an electoral college to elect the President of the Republic of Fiji, the Vice-President of Fiji, as well as 14 of the 32 Senators.

As chairman, Ganilau took a strong stand for law and order, and supported the prosecution of persons implicated in the 2000 coup. On 11 April 2003, he was quoted as saying that the ethnic politics promoted by nationalist politicians had resulted in coups that caused immense damage to the country. He spoke in support of Commodore Frank Bainimarama, who was then becoming increasingly vocal in his criticism of the Qarase government's ethno-nationalist leanings and sympathies for the 2000 coupists.

Both Ganilau and Army Commander, Frank Bainimarama, viewed Qarase's appeals to the primordial instincts of indigenous Fijians with deep suspicion. They saw Qarase's affirmative action policies and his subtle use of imagined threats to indigenous Fijian interests as polarising society along ethnic lines. They resented Qarase's use of ethnicity as a device to mobilise indigenous Fijian support. As far as Ganilau and Bainimarama were concerned, Fiji under Qarase was sliding headlong down a slippery slope towards a divided society with the spectre of a failed state looming large on the horizon. More importantly, it was a view shared by the Army.

On 6 August that year, Ganilau said that all persons implicated in that coup should be brought to justice, regardless of their position in the community. Culture and tradition should not, he said, impede the investigation of chiefs who had participated in the George Speight coup. He also rejected a call from Ratu Naiqama Lalabalavu, a Cabinet Minister and the Paramount Chief of the Tovata Confederacy, for the Great Council of Chiefs to replace the Senate as the upper house of the legislature. Ganilau argued that the chiefly system with its class distinctions and quasi-feudal values was incompatible with the democratic values underpinning modern representative government. To merge the two would create further confusion in the minds of indigenous Fijians who were already subject to two different administrative systems i.e. the laws and regulations of the central government viz a viz the laws regulating indigenous Fijian society under the Fijian Affairs Act (administered by the Ministry of i'Taukei Affairs).

Ganilau held the chairmanship until 21 July 2004 when Prime Minister Qarase did not renew Ganilau's membership on the Council and replaced him with Ratu Ovini Bokini, a former deputy chairman and the chief of Tavua.

He was a government appointee to the Council and the government decision not to renew his membership effectively removed him from that body.

The Qarase government gave no reason for its decision not to reappoint Ganilau but there were strained relations between Ganilau and the ethno-nationalists in Qarase's Cabinet who did not agree with Ganilau's multiracial agenda. Information Minister and staunch nationalist, Simione Kaitani, had criticised Ganilau for calling for the resignation of Vice-President Ratu Jope Seniloli, who in 2004 was on trial for his involvement in the 2000 ethno-nationlist coup led by George Speight. Defending Seniloli, Kaitani argued that Seniloli was legally entitled to a presumption of innocence until proven guilty and until such guilt was proven, Seniloli should remain as President. Kaitani went on to accuse Ganilau of hypocrisy, saying that he (Ganilau) was involved in the forced resignation of his father-in-law, Ratu Sir Kamisese Mara, as President on 29 May 2000.

There were also accusations that Ganilau was undermining the so-called political neutrality of the Bose Levu Vakaturaga with his calls for a revival of the defunct Alliance Party, the multi-racial political party founded by Ratu Mara, which governed Fiji from 1967 to 1987. Ganilau's call received support from a number of political factions, including the Indo-Fijian-dominated National Federation Party, but received a cold reception from Prime Minister Qarase's Soqosoqo Duavata ni Lewenivanua. They saw Ganilau's multiracial agenda as an unwelcome threat to the nationalist i'taukei vote they required to remain in power. Ganilau had hinted that he himself would play a role in reviving the proposed Alliance with its focus on multiracialism. The decision to oust Ganilau from the leadership of the Great Council of Chiefs was widely seen as a move by Qarase to prevent Ganilau from using the Council as a platform to advance his (Ganilau) political agenda. Clearly, Qarase regarded Ganilau as a threat and had set a course to neutralise him.

Both Qarase and Ganilau held visions of Fiji that were incompatible. Ganilau had ideas of a united multiracial Fiji that was modelled on Ratu Mara's Alliance government that governed the Dominion of Fiji from 1970 to 1987. In that set up the chiefs played an important mediating role among the various races in Fiji. Ganilau yearned for a return to those heady days when leadership was respected, political power was in the hands of respected Fijian high chiefs and race relations were stable. But in 1987 Mara and his chiefs lost power and indigenous Fijian paramountcy was restored through the Rabuka coup. After the coup of 1987, race and racial issues dominated the political discourse. Indigenous Fijian ethno-nationalism ran rampant. It divided Fiji society along racial lines. Ethnic minorities were marginalised. The Indo-Fijian community in particular was targeted. Many of them were thrown off the land they leased. Displaced Indo-Fijians congregated in refugee camps in some of the major towns. For the first time refugee camps were established in Fiji; indeed the whole South Pacific region. Thousands migrated overseas depriving Fiji of valuable human capital. This was the spectre that haunted Ganilau and other moderates like him who represented the silent majority in Fiji. They saw first hand the cost of racial politics and undertook to guard against its re-emergence. These issues provided the context for Ganilau's multiracial vision. It was a vision that competed against the primordialism pursued by Qarase and the ethno-nationalists behind him.

== Founder of the National Alliance Party ==
On 18 January 2005, Ganilau formally registered the National Alliance Party of Fiji. Joining him were university lecturer Meli Waqa as party secretary, and Manu Korovulavula as treasurer. Ganilau said the party would be multiracial and would pursue national reconciliation, something he had attempted without success as Chairman of the Bose Levu Vakaturaga. "I was quite outspoken about the need to respect the rights all citizens in Fiji during my role as chairman of the Great Council of Chiefs," he said, "but that did not go down well with some. That is why I decided it was best to continue the fight on a political platform."

In a speech to the Fiji Institute of Accountants on 28 April 2005, Ganilau called for a sense of national unity to be built by an emphasis on common values, shared by Indo-Fijians as well as indigenous Fijians. These values should, he said, include a vision of the kind of society Fiji should be – "a Fiji where people of different ethnicities, religions and cultures can live and work together for the good of all, can differ without rancour, govern without violence and accept responsibility as reasonable people intent on serving the best interest of all". He called racism "a primary force of evil designed to destroy good men," and asked all Fijian citizens to learn from the past to build a better future. "I would like to make the point that we cannot undo the past but we can learn from it, and we cannot predict the future but we can shape and build it," Ganilau said.

On 3 May 2005, Ganilau strongly criticised Prime Minister Qarase for his calls for ethnic Fijians to unite politically to provide stable national leadership. Ganilau said this policy was "divisive and a travesty of good governance and responsible leadership in a multiracial country like Fiji." He called on his fellow-chiefs to take a stand against what he considered a move to pit indigenous Fijians against other races. Ganilau also spoke of the importance of chiefly institutions, saying that chiefs provided permanent leadership for the Fijian people, unlike politicians who could be dismissed at the ballot box and were susceptible to the temptation to appeal to voters' racist sympathies to win power. "Very often, to remain in power the easiest option for them would be to play the racist card, drum up fears of marginalisation and extinction of other ethnic groups," he said. He said the country would prosper if all political leaders would support the role of chiefly leaders and make "a serious effort" to bring together all the people of Fiji.

In a speech to the Lautoka Rotary Club on 13 May 2005, Ganilau called for better pay for professional and skilled workers, and also attacked racial discrimination in the employment, saying that it was socially and economically harmful and resulted in second rate replacements for talented people. "When we leave out people on the grounds of ethnicity we limit our options, he said. "As such, we become poorer because we are not making optimum use of our human resources, thereby depriving us of the returns and full benefit of our capabilities."

== Domestic policies ==
Ganilau was an outspoken but moderate chief and politician, who opposed the divisive and inflammatory statements of political leaders. He was an idealist in many respects with a vision for a united, multicultural Fiji. Perhaps his greatest error as a politician lay in his underestimation of the strength and persistence of ethnic politics in Fiji. In opposition, Laisenia Qarase, advocated for policies to benefit indigenous Fijians, who are the majority population compared to the ethnic Indian minority.

=== Reconciliation, Tolerance, and Unity Bill ===
Ganilau spoke against the plans of the Qarase government to establish a Reconciliation and Unity Commission, with the power to grant amnesty to perpetrators of the 2000 coup and compensation to its victims. Ganilau first aired his opposition to the bill on 4 May 2005, saying that it was an unwarranted interference in the judicial process and represented a naïve and uncaring attitude to people who had suffered as a result of the coup. On 18 May he went further, saying that he saw "nothing reconciliatory about the bill" and that "To use the word reconciliation is a gross violation of the rights of everyone in this nation."

On 16 June, Ganilau continued his attack on the legislation. He said that there was a widespread belief in Fiji that it was designed to provide for the freeing of coup perpetrators, a belief supported by the Tui Vaturova, Ratu Ilisoni Rokotuibua who said early in June that it would allow members of the Counter Revolutionary Warfare Unit, who had been jailed for mutiny, to be released. Having built up such expectations, Ganilau said, the government had better be prepared for a strong backlash if they are not fulfilled. He criticised Qarase for expecting the people, as ordinary mortals, to do as only God could do by legislating forgiveness and freeing people from the consequences of their actions.

On 23 June, Ganilau accused the Prime Minister of having committed a "monumental deception" by asking church leaders to support the legislation without honestly explaining its real purpose to them. He was reacting to revelations from Roman Catholic Archbishop Petero Mataca and other church leaders that at a meeting with the Prime Minister on 2 May, they had been told of the reconciliation and compensation provisions of the legislation, but not about its amnesty provisions. "It does not say much about the credibility of the Prime Minister for him to be saying publicly that the Christian churches support the bill after these deliberate acts of deception." Ganilau said. He called on churches to join with other religions to put together an alternative blueprint to the government's reconciliation proposals.

=== Law and order, moral values ===
Speaking at the Crime Prevention/Reconciliation Sports Day in Flagstaff on 4 June 2005, Ganilau called on the older generation to instill basic moral values in their children. "Increasing lawlessness and criminal activity can be interpreted as discourteous behaviour and lack of respect for other people and their property. So what we need to do if we want to salvage the situation is to go back to the basics," he said. The same day, he strongly criticised the country's leadership, saying that they were taking Fiji in the wrong direction, "spreading their gospel of fear and hate and not doing anything to help the ordinary people put bread on their table for their families." He warned against retaliation, however: "I believe we must not fight fire with fire, we will be burnt." The only way extremist ethno-nationalists could be stopped from destroying the nation, he said, was to deny them the opportunity to control the destiny of the nation. This was seen as an oblique reference to the ethno-nationalists in Qarase's cabinet. He also called on people to respect one another, saying that it was the only way for lasting unity and reconciliation.

At the 80th birthday celebration of Satya Sai Baba at Lautoka's Girmit Centre on 23 November 2005, Ganilau called for more religious programs to promote morality in private and public life. Most politicians were selfish and lacked moral values, he claimed. Teaching young people good values at home and at school would be "useless" if adults and political leaders were doing what children were taught not to do, he declared. He said that the country had strayed from spiritual values and had lost its way, with bribery, extortion, misuse of public funds, abuse of office, and racism having become common place at all levels of government. He claimed that the number of beggars and unschooled children was increasing while politicians were engaged in "egotistical pursuits."

In the same address, Ganilau also declared that all religions have the same essential teaching about the unity of divinity and the cultivation of universal love, and condemned those he considered responsible for creating "confusion" and "chaos" by "fragmenting divinity". "How often have we seen the bigotry of the religious fanaticisms and intolerance that have occurred in Fiji?" he asked. "Temples have been desecrated, places of worship are destroyed, all in the prejudice view that one religion is the true one and others are not."

=== Ethnic relations ===
Ganilau was a guest speaker at the Lautoka conference of the Fiji Labour Party, with which his own party subsequently formed a coalition to contest the general election scheduled for 2006, on 30 July 2005. Calling for changes in the attitudes of indigenous Fijians to allow everyone born in Fiji to be classified as "Fijian," he said that the country could not afford to remain fragmented and polarised on racial lines, and that racially based measures enacted by the present government were shortening the fuse on a time bomb. "Government seems unaware that the more race-based measures it tries to put in place the faster that time bomb burns to detonation point," Ganilau said. He said that until Fiji Islanders got out of their ethnic boxes and embraced multiculturalism, Fiji's future as a nation would not be secure. He expressed disbelief that after a century and a quarter of sharing the land, the level of cultural interaction between the major racial groups was so low.

Speaking at the launch in Rakiraki of his own party's campaign for the 2006 election on 6 August 2005, Ganilau said that the future of the nation's children would not be secure unless the people freed themselves from what he called "the comfort zone of our race." He said it was important to break down the imaginary ethnic wall separating the people. "We should not allow ourselves, individually or our ethnic communities to become easy tools for politics of race that will continue to segregate us mentally and emotionally," he said. He strongly criticised recent moves to form an ethnic Fijian electoral block, saying that would be divisive and would never lead to national unity. He accused "unscrupulous politicians" of promoting racially divided visions for Fiji.

He continued his attack on racially divisive politics with a number of speeches and interviews in the last week of August. He condemned Senator Apisai Tora for saying that indigenous Fijians would not accept a non-indigenous Prime Minister, and charged the government with fostering ethnic tensions to distract the public from its own "non-performance". He also accused the government of handling its relations with Opposition parties in a "crude and amateurish way" which prevented any cross-party agreement on land reform, necessary for obtaining the two-thirds parliamentary majority for amending the Constitution. This would create a mess for the next government to clean up after the 2006 election, Ganilau said on 27 August.

=== Chiefs and the political order ===
On 4 September, Ganilau strongly criticised Prime Minister Qarase for comments made at the Commonwealth Parliamentary Association in Nadi on 29 August. Qarase had said that while Fiji "accepted" western-style democracy, it was an alien concept and certain aspects of it clashed with Fijian traditions, in which chiefs were at the apex by virtue of their birth and rank. Ganilau ridiculed Qarase's speech, saying that Fiji's political and judicial institutions were firmly rooted in western democracy and that the Fijian people should not be "misled" by the Prime Minister's claims that democracy was alien to the country. "Mr Qarase should answer whether he wants the western system of governance which allows him to be Prime Minister, or the Fijian tradition which requires the chiefs to rule by virtue of their birthright and rank. Otherwise, he is just being hypocritical to save face," Ganilau said.

Ganilau spoke out on 16 September to dismiss claims that most of Fiji's problems were being caused by the "disrespect" of Indo-Fijians and other non-indigenous communities towards the country's chiefs. Making a parliamentary submission on controversial Unity Bill, Masi Kaumaitotoya had declared that the jailing of chiefs on coup-related offences was a clear sign of disrespect, and that indigenous Fijians were being taken advantage of by others. In response, Ganilau said as the former Chairman of the Great Council of Chiefs that he believed that the chiefs were well respected by all communities. He also called on his fellow chiefs to play a greater role in promoting national unity by serving all citizens in their district or confederacy, regardless of race. Chiefs who had participated in the 2000 coup should not get preferential treatment, he added.

=== The AIDS crisis ===
There was a spike in AIDS cases in Fiji, jumping from only 10 cases in the year 2000 to 111 in 2003, with indigenous Fijians making up 80% of cases. Ganilau signed an agreement with the UN AIDS Pacific in 2004, and planned follow up meetings to determine how to combat the spread of the virus. Fiji's Great Council of Chiefs hosted a week-long workshop called 'Accelerating Action Against Aids in the Pacific' that was also sponsored by UNAIDS.

Speaking at the Pan Pacific HIV/AIDS Conference in Auckland, New Zealand in late October 2005, Ganilau called for strong leadership to confront HIV/AIDS, saying that it was a global war which threatened the very future of Pacific Islands nations. "We can only ignore this battle at the cost of being regarded by future generations of Pacific Islanders as lacking the will, the foresight, the understanding to tackle this issue, which threatens our very future," he told the delegates.

=== Criticism of affirmative action ===
Launching the Lautoka branch of his party on 24 November 2005, Ganilau said that affirmative action in favour of indigenous Fijians had not benefited ordinary Fijians, but had served only to facilitate the survival of the government in power and acted as a cover-up for the lack of effective policies. Instead of affirmative action, he said, the government should do more to assist Fijian landowners to develop their land commercially, and to improve educational and economic opportunities for ordinary people.

=== The politicisation of the military ===
In an interview with Australian ABC Television's Asia Pacific Focus programme on 27 November 2005, Ganilau regretted the way the military had become politicised since the 1987 coups. People including former failed politicians with no military training whatsoever were rewarded for their political support of Rabuka by being commissioned as officers. These included senior NCOs who were promoted beyond their competence to commissioned rank thus leaving a yawning gap at the NCO level that resulted in a loss of capability. The high standards of professionalism of the Fijian military was seriously compromised. Its reputation as an apolitical professional military organisation was in tatters. It would take several years, he said, before the military could regain its professional standards and the respect it previously enjoyed from the community.

== 2006 election ==
The National Alliance Party announced on 17 March 2006 that Ganilau would lead the party into the election scheduled for 6–13 May, and that he would contest the Suva City Open Constituency. The attempt was unsuccessful; neither Ganilau nor any of his party's candidates were elected.

== 2006 coup d'état ==
Months of tension between the government and the Republic of Fiji Military Forces culminated in a military coup on 5 December 2006. Citing alleged governmental corruption, Ganilau told Fiji Television that he supported the "cause" of the military, but not its method, and denied public rumours that he had been a party to the planning of the coup. He called on his fellow-chiefs, however, to accept the "reality" of the Military takeover and work to move the country forward. He also claimed that he had been asked to mediate between the Great Council of Chiefs and the Military, as a former head of both bodies, but the council chairman, Ratu Ovini Bokini, angrily denied making any such request. "I never made a request to meet the commander. Whoever said that is lying. I don't intend to see the commander. He has to make a request to me if he wants to meet me," Bokini declared. In making that statement Bokini regarded the Great Council of Chiefs as remaining above secular politics as well as the various institutions of government, including the Army. It was an unrealistic and erroneous notion given the history of chiefly support for the ethno-nationalist coups of 1987 and 2000.

In the interim government that was formed after the coup, Ganilau served for one year as Minister of Defense, at the request of President Ratu Josefa Iloilo, but resigned a year later when it became clear that the interim government was not delivering on its promise to hold elections.

Ganilau was the Minister of Defense under Bainimarama, but resigned in 2010.

== 2013 Constitution ==
Frank Bainimarama and those behind him had ideas to create another Constitution that would purportedly assuage ethic Fijian fears and form the basis of a united, multicultural Fiji. The drawing up of a new Constitution was a complicated process that needed time. Indeed, it was not until 2014 that national elections under a new (2013) Constitution took place. Critics of the 2013 Constitution of Fiji say it should have been put to a referendum to give it credibility. They say it was foisted upon the people without their consent. For the Bainimarama government the elections of 2014 and 2018 gave legitimacy to the Constitution.

The unfettered powers the Bainimarama government enjoyed during its term as an unelected military government (2006-2014) led it to retain some of the draconian laws and decrees it had introduced during its tenure. It retained the modus operandi of maintaining a very close watch over the population where dissenters and potential dissenters were victimised. New rules and regulations covering virtually every activity in society led some to complain that Fiji was a small country with so many rules. Those who disagreed with the decisions of government were soon marginalised. Fijians living overseas including academics who were critical of government policy were banned from ever returning to Fiji. Senior public servants who did not toe the government line were soon pushed out to pasture and investigated by the government's 'anti corruption" watchdog. The security forces exceeded their powers in the bashing of dissenters. It created a climate of fear. Government was accused of paranoia.

Democracy was a facade, the critics argued. Real power was being exercised by two men backed by the Army and Police: viz the inarticulate Prime Minister reading from prepared scripts written for him by hired US publicity agents QORVIS; backed by his ambitious Indo-Fijian Attorney General and Deputy Prime Minister who saw things in black and white and who micro-managed all aspects of government policy and administration. He was regarded as the 'real prime minister' making decisions behind the scenes for his bumbling leader. He was a man not to be crossed, a highly polarising figure.

The i'Taukei (indigenous population) felt their rights were being eroded and their identity disrespected. The results of the 2018 elections confirmed the polarisation of races. The noble aims of the 2013 Constitution existed only in theory. At the practical level, the personal attacks and mudslinging against the indigenous leaders and those opposed to government served to galvanise political unity within the indigenous population against the Bainimarama government. Group identity and solidarity in the face of perceived threats was being emphasised by the Opposition. Ironically, the political behaviour of the Bainimarama government towards its political opponents compelled the latter to play upon the primordial instincts of indigenous Fijians. Backed into a corner the Opposition had no other choice. They were between a rock and a hard place.

Ratu Epeli Ganilau was named a presidential candidate in 2015, but the position was won by Jioji Konrote. Konrote was not a member of the Council of Chiefs. This election was the first secret ballot cast under the 2013 Fijian Constitution.

In the November 2018 elections, the governing Fiji First Party was returned with a very much reduced majority securing just over 50% of the votes and losing six seats in the process. A strategic shift in voting patterns against the Fiji First government had taken place. In the face of perceived threats to its identity indigenous Fijian group interests increasingly came to determine their political choices. Whether this trend will gain sufficient momentum over the next four years to bring about a change of government in 2022 remains to be seen. Ni sa moce.

== Personal life ==
Ganilau hailed from the village of Somosomo, in Taveuni. He was the son of the late Ratu Sir Penaia Ganilau, the first President of the Republic of Fiji (1987–1993). Like his late father, Ratu Epeli was a member of the same Mataqali Valelevu (the tribal landowning unit) of which the Tui Cakau is the head. Originally they were a migrant tribe who referred to themselves as the Ai Sokula who settled and subsequently merged with their host society, the Cakaudrove people on the south coast of Vanua Levu near the village of Vunisavisavi. The Ai Sokula led by their chief, the Tui Cakau, achieved ascendancy over others through conquest. They subsequently moved to Taveuni and later occupied the village site of Somosomo which became the seat of the Tui Cakau and the Vanua of Lalagavesi. Ratu Epeli was a member of the Ai Sokula (the term refers to the chiefs of the Vanua of Lalagavesi). He was a relative of the current Tui Cakau (Ratu Naiqama Lalabalavu). Ratu Epeli Ganilau was married to Adi Ateca Mara, the eldest daughter of Ratu Sir Kamisese Mara, the founding father of modern Fiji. Adi Ateca died in November 2018. They had two sons and two daughters. Ganilau also had nine grandchildren. His hobbies included rugby, boxing, and shooting.

Ganilau died on 23 March 2023, at the age of 71.

Political offices
Preceded by Sitiveni Rabuka	Commander of the Republic of Fiji Military Forces; 1992–1999	Succeeded by Frank Bainimarama
Preceded by Sitiveni Rabuka	Chairman of the Great Council of Chiefs; 2001–2004	Succeeded by Ratu Ovini Bokini
