= Ratu Sir Lala Sukuna Day =

Public holiday in Fiji

Ratu Sir Lala Sukuna Day (commonly known as Ratu Sukuna Day) was a national public holiday in Fiji until the year 2010, when the Prime Minister, Commodore Voreqe Bainimarama, declared both Ratu Sir Lala Sakuna Day and National Youth Day to no longer be public holidays. It was originally celebrated annually on the last Monday of May, in honour of Lala Sukuna (1888-1958), the national father of modern Fiji, whose death anniversary falls on 30 May. The week leading up to Ratu Sukuna Day is marked by public celebrations with speeches and events, with an address from the President of Fiji on the closing day. Members of the public enter Parliament grounds to polish Sukuna's statue.

== 2000 Festivities ==
Ratu Sukuna Day in 2000 was marred by the insurrection instigated by George Speight on 19 May 2000, which led to the dismissal of the elected government on 27 May. On Ratu Sukuna Day, Fijian citizens woke up to hear of the military takeover the night before, in the wake of the resignation, possibly forced, of the President, Ratu Sir Kamisese Mara.

== 2005 festivities ==
Ratu Sir Lala Sukuna Day in 2005 was celebrated in 19 centers around Fiji, including on the island of Rotuma. 24 May saw the beginning of a week of celebrations that culminated on 30 May with an event at Suva's Albert Park, with President Ratu Josefa Iloilo as the chief guest.

Prime Minister Laisenia Qarase launched the festivities under the theme of Unity in Diversity on 24 May by officially opening the new Ratu Sukuna Memorial School in Nabua. The newly completed Great Council of Chiefs complex was opened the same day, and Qarase officially launched a website about Ratu Sukuna. A song has also been composed to mark the celebrations. The Fiji Museum in Suva also hosted an exhibition featuring photographs, along with medals, walking sticks, and a glass-encased tabua (whale's tooth) that had belonged to Ratu Sukuna.

Alluding to the ethnic, religious, and political divisions that have riven Fiji in recent years, Ratu Josateki Nawalowalo, the national organizer of the celebrations, described Ratu Sukuna as "a master of reconciliation" from whom the present generation should learn. "This is the kind of leader we should try to emulate because he was true to himself and rose to the occasion when faced with daunting challenges, always proving to the nation that they could depend on him."

=== Critical voices ===
A few discontented voices were raised. On 23 May, Meli Bogileka, general secretary of the People's National Party and a former minister in the Chaudhry government (1999-2000) said that Ratu Sukuna's achievements had been overstated, and overlooked the way his policies had confined native Fijians to pocket settlements and villages which, Bogileka considered, had impeded their progress. His comments drew an immediate rebuff from the government, which in a press release said that Bogileka's statement was inaccurate and insensitive, and should be "treated with the contempt it deserves." Bogileka reiterated his comments on 26 May, saying that Sukuna should have used his chiefly position to encourage indigenous Fijians to work rather than remain in their villages in the name of culture. "I stand wholeheartedly by the comments I made because it is the truth and the poverty that indigenous Fijians are now facing is largely because we rely too much on our families for our survival and cannot really fend for ourselves like other races do," Bogileka said.

Senator Ratu George Cakobau, son of former Governor-General Ratu Sir George Cakobau, said on 25 May that unless Ratu Sukuna's vision for Fiji was followed, the celebrations would be a waste of money.

=== Removal as a national holiday ===
On March 18, 2010, Commodore Voreqe Bainimarama announced that both Ratu Sir Lala Sakuna Day and National Youth Day would no longer be treated as public holidays, as a result of a Cabinet decision to amend the Employment Relations Promulgation. This announcement was met by some confusion and was further clarified by the Ministry of Information on March 22, 2010. The Ministry of Information published a press release stating that these two days were not in need of a public holiday in order to celebrate them.

=== Reinstatement as national holiday ===
During his inaugural address to the nation prime Minister Sitiveni Rabuka announced they will reinstate Ratu Sukuna Day.
