= Injimo Managreve =

Fijian politician

Injimo Managreve is a former chairman of the Council of Rotuma, the legislative body for the Fijian island dependency which enjoys a considerable degree of local autonomy.

== Politics ==
Managreve was a strong supporter of the Prime Minister Laisenia Qarase's government's controversial Reconciliation, Tolerance, and Unity Bill. Subject to presidential approval, this Commission would have had the power to compensate victims and pardon perpetrators of events connected with or related to the civilian coup d'état which overthrew the elected government in May 2000. Speaking after a Council meeting on 1 July 2005, Managreve said that forgiveness was a part of Rotuman culture. He also said that it was important for Rotumans to support the national government, because their fate was linked to that of the country as a whole. "We are being looked after by the Government and the GCC of Fiji and if anything happens to them we will also go down with them. That is why we are standing behind them and supporting them with their new Bill," he said.
