= Savenaca Draunidalo =

Fijian politician (1950–2007)

Savenaca Uluibau Draunidalo (1950 – 22 December 2007), known sometimes by his chiefly title of Ratu, was a Fijian politician, who served in the Cabinet from 2001 to 2006, when a military coup ended his ministerial career. He died in a fishing accident on 22 December 2007, when his outboard boat capsized and hit him when he was en route to Naroi to celebrate the 21st birthday of his youngest daughter, Bulou Gavidi Draunidalo. Draunidalo was from the chiefly family of Naroi, Moala, in the Lau Islands.

Draunidalo was a career soldier who rose to the rank of colonel and founded the largest battalion in the Fiji Army, the Third Infantry Regiment (3FIR). He was awarded the Military Cross by Her Majesty the Queen in recognition of his services with the Fiji Infantry Regiment serving in Lebanon as part of the United Nations Peace Keeping Force United Nations Peace Keeping Missions in the Middle East and in Bougainville.

Draunidalo also served in the civil service, holding such posts as Deputy Permanent Secretary of Home Affairs and Commissioner Eastern. In the election held in September 2001, Draunidalo, won the Lau Taveuni Rotuma Open Constituency. Though elected as an independent candidate, he was appointed to the Soqosoqo Duavata ni Lewenivanua (SDL)-dominated Cabinet as Minister for Works and Energy. In the parliamentary election held on 6–13 May, he retained his seat with a large majority, and was subsequently appointed Minister for Public Enterprises.

Draunidalo was the first husband of the late Adi Kuini Speed, a paramount chief (who held the title of Tui Noikoro) and Deputy Prime Minister in the Chaudhry government of 1999–2000. They had two children: Tupou Draunidalo, a lawyer and Vice President of the Fiji Law Society, and Captain Isireli Draunidalo, a Commissioned Officer of the Republic of Fiji Military Forces. Draunidalo subsequently married Salesia Mataitoga, with whom he had two daughters - Adi Illeyah and Bulou Gavidi, who were both educated at New Zealand universities.
