= Naiqama =

Naiqama is a name of Fijian origin. Notable people with the name include:

- Kevin Naiqama (born 1989), Australian-Fijian Rugby League player
- Wes Naiqama (born 1982), Australian-Fijian Rugby League player
- Naiqama Lalabalavu (born 1953), Fijian Chief
