= Maciu Navakasuasua =

Fijian nationalist

Maciu Navakasuasua is a Fijian public figure and former political organizer. An explosives expert, Navakasuasua said that on behalf of the Nationalist Vanua Tako Lavo Party, an extremist party which advocated the "repatriation" to India of Indo-Fijians, two prominent businessmen had tried to hire him to assassinate Prime Minister Mahendra Chaudhry in 1999 while he was passing through Nadi International Airport. Navakasuasua served a three-year prison sentence on Nukulau Island for coup-related offences.

In an interview with the Fiji Sun in September 2005, Navakasuasua claimed that George Speight was just a frontman for the coup. He had been co-opted by the organizers one day before the execution of the coup, on 19 May 2000, and had proceeded to usurp the leadership, Navakasuasua claimed.

Navakasuasua, who told the Sun that a religious conversion experience had led him to confess what he knew, alleged that some police officers were not taking the investigation of coup-suspects seriously enough, noting that his own 13-page submission had been largely ignored. Among other allegations, Navakasuasua implicated then Cabinet Minister Konisi Yabaki in the coup plot, allegations angrily denied by Yabaki.

The Sun reported on 13 March 2006 that Navakasuasua had recently met Military Commander Commodore Frank Bainimarama and had revealed all that he knew about the individuals involved in the planning and execution of the coup. Bainimarama confirmed the meeting, which he described as "fruitful." Navakasuasua endorsed claims that he had been threatened with death if he ever returned to Fiji. The claims, made by coup accomplice Josaia Waqabaca, had been reported to the police and the army, and by Commodore Bainimarama, who said he was not surprised as Navakasuasua had implicated some powerful people.
