= Semi Seruvakula =

Fijian chief and politician (died 2018)

Ratu Semi Bayameyame Seruvakula (died 4 December 2018) was a Fijian chief and former politician, who served as Assistant Minister for Education in the interim Cabinet formed by Laisenia Qarase in the wake of the Fiji coup of 2000. He held office until an elected government took power in September 2001.

Seruvakula was the chief of Nasautoka village in Wainibuka District, which is part of Tailevu Province.

His son is Ratu Viliame Seruvakula.
