= Minister for iTaukei Affairs =

The Minister for iTaukei Affairs is the Cabinet Minister responsible for the preservation of Fijian culture and for the economic and social development of indigenous Fijians and the Ministry of iTaukei Affairs. Before 2013, the position was called Minister for Fijian Affairs.

Prior to 1999, the Minister for Fijian Affairs also presided over the Great Council of Chiefs, but after that the Great Council elected its own Chairman. The following individuals have held the office since the ministerial system was established in 1967, when Fiji was still a British colony. If the Minister was simultaneously the Prime Minister, this is indicated by an asterisk.

The current Minister is Ifereimi Vasu.

== List of ministers ==
Order	Minister	Term of office	Prime Minister served under
1.	Ratu Sir Penaia Ganilau	1967–1970	Ratu Sir Kamisese Mara
2.	Ratu Sir George Cakobau	1970–1972	Ratu Sir Kamisese Mara
3.	Ratu William Toganivalu	1972–1977	Ratu Sir Kamisese Mara
.	Ratu Sir Penaia Ganilau	1977–1983	Ratu Sir Kamisese Mara
4.	Ratu Sir Kamisese Mara	1983–1985	*
5.	Ratu David Toganivalu	1985–1987	Ratu Sir Kamisese Mara
6.	Timoci Bavadra	1987	*
7.	Ratu Josua Toganivalu	1987	Governor-General; Ratu Sir Penaia Ganilau
8.	Ratu Meli Vesikula	1987	Governor-General; Ratu Sir Penaia Ganilau
9.	Vatiliai Navunisaravi	1987–1992	Ratu Sir Kamisese Mara
10.	Sitiveni Rabuka	1992–1994	*
11.	Adi Samanunu Cakobau Talakuli	1994–1995	Sitiveni Rabuka
.	Sitiveni Rabuka	1995–1997	*
12.	Ratu Finau Mara	1997–1999	Sitiveni Rabuka
13.	Adi Kuini Speed	1999–2000	Mahendra Chaudhry
14.	Ratu Epeli Nailatikau	2000–2001	Laisenia Qarase
15.	Laisenia Qarase	2000–2006	*
16.	Ratu Epeli Ganilau	2007–2008	Frank Bainimarama
17.	Frank Bainimarama	2008–2022	*
18.	Ifereimi Vasu	2022–present	Sitiveni Rabuka
