= Josaia Tavaiqia =

Fijian chief and politician

Ratu Sir Josaia Tavaiqia, KBE (1931 – 17 November 1997) was a Fijian chief and politician.

He served as one of two vice presidents of Fiji from 1990 until his death in 1997. (From 1990 to 1999, Fiji had two vice-presidents concurrently).

Tavaiqia, who held the chiefly title of Tui Vuda, or Paramount Chief of Vuda. He is one of the subdivisions of Ba Province, died on 17 November 1997 at the age of 66. He was succeeded, both as Tui Vuda and as vice-president by Ratu Josefa Iloilo.

He was a civil servant before he ventured into politics, serving as a Cabinet Minister in the administration of Ratu Sir Kamisese Mara in the 1970s-1980s. He was well known for his efforts to improve the livelihood of the people of the Ba Province. During his tenure as Minister for Forests, Tavaiqia negotiated with landowners to lease marginal land with little use for any agricultural development to the Fiji Pine Commission and later Fiji Pine Limited.

Preceded by (new office)	Vice-President of Fiji; 1990–1997	Succeeded by Ratu Josefa Iloilo
Preceded by ??	Tui Vuda ???–1997	Succeeded by Ratu Josefa Iloilo
