= Ifereimi Vasu =

Fijian politician

The Honourable Ifereimi Vasu MP
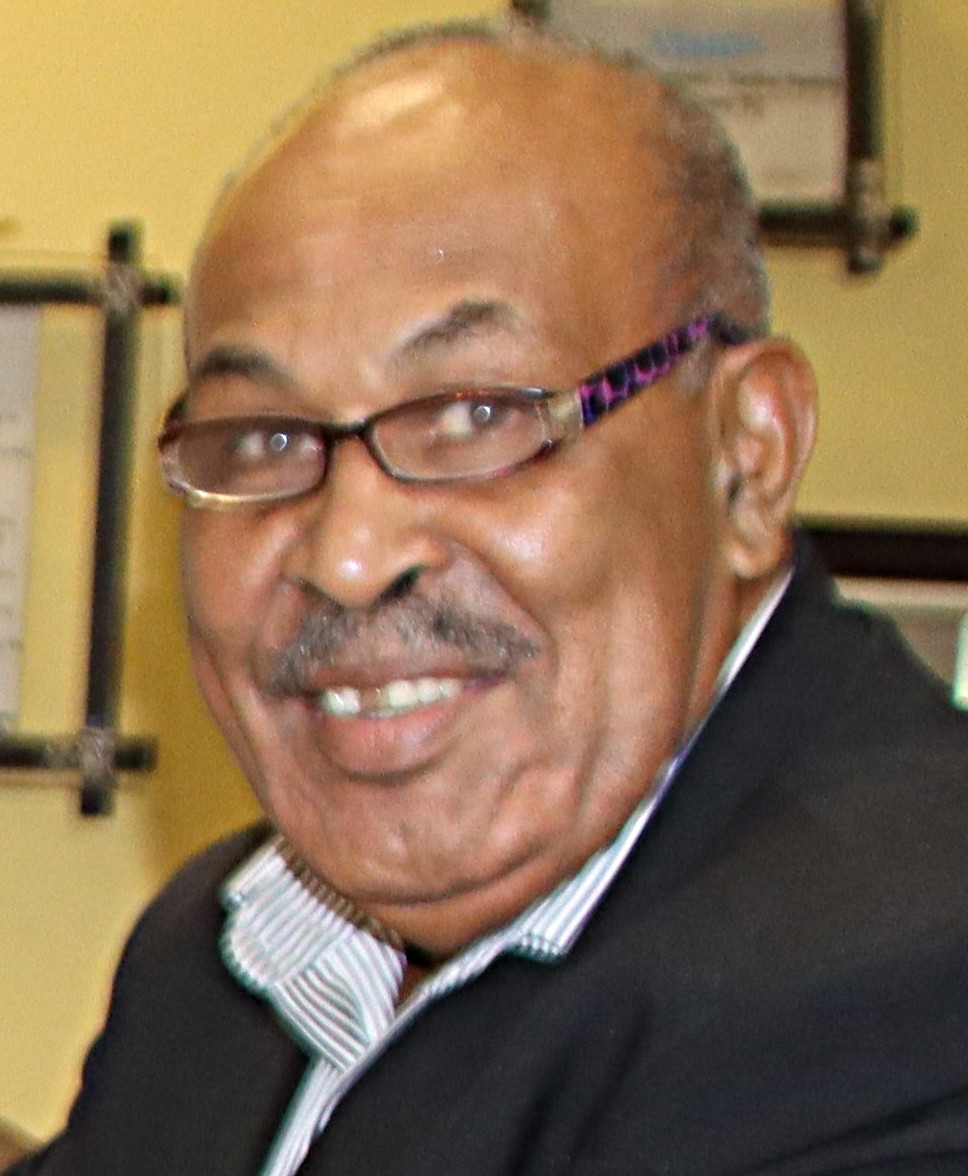

Minister for iTaukei Affairs
- Incumbent
- Assumed office 24 December 2022
- Prime Minister: Sitiveni Rabuka
- Preceded by: Frank Bainimarama

Minister for Culture, Heritage and Arts
- Incumbent
- Assumed office 24 December 2022

Member of the Fijian Parliament for SODELPA List
- Incumbent
- Assumed office 14 December 2022
- Preceded by: Premila Kumar

Personal details
- Born: 1959 or 1960 (age 65–66)
- Party: Social Democratic Liberal Party

Ifereimi Vasu (born ~1960) is a Fijian politician and Cabinet Minister. He is a member of the Social Democratic Liberal Party (SODELPA).

Vasu previously served in the Republic of Fiji Military Forces, reaching the rank of lieutenant colonel. He did not participate in the 1987, 2000, or 2006 coups, being in training or overseas at the time. Following the 2006 Fijian coup d'état he was appointed as commissioner for the Eastern District by the Bainamarama regime. In 2011 he was appointed Corrections Service Commissioner. As corrections commissioner he oversaw the imprisonment of former prime minister Laisenia Qarase.

In December 2015 he was fired as corrections commissioner and charged with abuse of office following an investigation by the Fiji Independent Commission Against Corruption. He was acquitted by the High Court of Fiji in December 2019.

In June 2022 he was selected as a SODELPA candidate for the 2022 Fijian general election. He was elected to the Parliament of Fiji with 1427 votes. On 24 December 2022 he was appointed Minister for iTaukei Affairs, Culture, Heritage and Arts in the coalition government of Sitiveni Rabuka.
