= Tui Vuda =

Traditional title of a district chief in Fiji

Tui Vuda is the traditional title of the paramount chief of the vanua o Vuda in Ba Province on Fiji's northwest coast. The mandate of Tui Vuda is said to trace its lineage to Lutunasobasoba, one of the founding fathers of Fiji.

The most recent person to hold the title is Ratu Josaia Tuivou Tavaiqia. Ratu Tuivou was installed as Tui Vuda on the 13 of August, 2026 ; a day after the funeral of the late Tui Vuda Ratu Eparama Kitione Tavaiqia.

The Kingmakers of Vuda reverently guard their traditional role of ensuring that Vuda always has a father to lead the vanua.

Other former Tui Vuda & statemen of Fiji include the former Vice-President of Fiji Ratu Sir Josaia Tavaiqia and the former President of Fiji Ratu Josefa Iloilo Uluivuda
