= Viliame Seruvakula =

Ratu Viliame Seruvakula is a former Fijian military officer and politician.

== Biography ==
He is the son of former politician Ratu Semi Seruvakula.

Seruvakula joined the army in the early 1980s and served in the Sinai Peninsula and in Lebanon from 1986 to 1987 as a platoon commander in the Charlie company of the First Battalion, Fiji Infantry Regiment. He opposed the 2000 coup, and when rebels from the Counter Revolutionary Warfare Unit mutinied at Suva's Queen Elizabeth Barracks on 2 November 2000, he led the third infantry battalion in a counter-offensive to retake the barracks from the rebels.

Following the mutiny, Seruvakula made some controversial statements in the media. He alleged that he had been offered F$250,000 to support George Speight's attempted coup in May, and that former Prime Minister Sitiveni Rabuka (who led two coups in 1987) had incited the mutiny and attempted to overthrow the military commander, Commodore Frank Bainimarama. His police statement became the subject of several investigations, and Rabuka was charged but ultimately acquitted as a result of his allegations.

Seruvakula joined the New Zealand Army in 2001. He resigned from the military in early 2006 to take up a post with the Peace and Security division of the United Nations. He was elected as Chairman of the Great Council of Chiefs in 2024.
