= Chairman of the Great Council of Chiefs =

1999–2012 office heading a Fijian constitutional body

The Chairman of the Great Council of Chiefs is the presiding officer, chairman and highest authority of the Great Council of Chiefs (Fijian: Bose Levu Vakaturaga) an advisory body to the Parliament of Fiji. The chairman is elected by the members of the Great Council of Chiefs and is expected to be politically impartial.

The Great Council of Chiefs is the formal assembly of Fiji's senior hereditary chiefs, along with some representatives of the national government and provincial councils, who may or may not be hereditary chiefs themselves. It also had a constitutional role in functioning as an electoral college to choose the President of the Republic, as well as 14 of the 32 Senators.

Following the adoption of the ministerial system of government in 1967, the Minister for Fijian Affairs (the Cabinet Minister responsible for indigenous cultural and economic development) presided over the Great Council of Chiefs. This arrangement continued until the constitutional changes of 1999, when the Great Council chose its own Chairman for the first time.

The following tables list the Fijian Affairs Ministers from 1967 to 1999, and Chairmen of the Great Council of Chiefs since that date.

== Ministers for Fijian Affairs (1967–1999) ==
Ministers of Fijian Affairs since 1999 are not included, as they no longer preside over the Great Council. If the Minister was simultaneously the Prime Minister, this is indicated by an asterisk.

Order	Minister	Term of office	Prime Minister served under
1.	Ratu Penaia Ganilau	1967–1970	Ratu Sir Kamisese Mara
2.	Ratu Sir George Cakobau	1970–1972	Ratu Sir Kamisese Mara
3.	Ratu William Toganivalu	1972–1977	Ratu Sir Kamisese Mara
.	Ratu Sir Penaia Ganilau	1977–1983	Ratu Sir Kamisese Mara
4.	Ratu Sir Kamisese Mara	1983–1985	*
5.	Ratu David Toganivalu	1985–1987	Ratu Sir Kamisese Mara
6.	Timoci Bavadra	1987	*
7.	Ratu Josua Toganivalu	1987	Governor-General; Ratu Sir Penaia Ganilau
8.	Ratu Meli Vesikula	1987	Governor-General; Ratu Sir Penaia Ganilau
9.	Vatiliai Navunisaravi	1987–1992	Ratu Sir Kamisese Mara
10.	Sitiveni Rabuka	1992–1994	*
11.	Adi Samanunu Cakobau-Talakuli	1994–1995	Sitiveni Rabuka
.	Sitiveni Rabuka	1995–1997	*
12.	Ratu Finau Mara	1997–1999	Sitiveni Rabuka

== Chairmen of the Great Council of Chiefs ==
Since 1999, when the Council chose its own chairman for the first time, the following individuals have held the office. In April 2007, the council was suspended by "interim prime minister" and military leader Frank Bainimarama, who had taken power in a coup in December 2006. In February 2008, Bainimarama announced that he was appointing himself chairman of the council. In early August 2008, it was announced that the Great Council of Chiefs was ready to reconvene. It would be chaired by the Minister for Fijian Affairs - namely, at that time, Commodore Bainimarama. In October 2008, Ratu Epeli Nailatikau was named Minister of Indigenous (Fijian) Affairs, and therefore also Chairman of the Great Council of Chiefs.

In April 2009, Nailatikau was appointed Vice-President of Fiji.

Order	Chairman	Term of office
1.	Sitiveni Rabuka	1999–2001
2.	Ratu Epeli Ganilau	2001–2004
3.	Ratu Ovini Bokini	2004 – April 2007
4.	Frank Bainimarama	February 2008 – October 2008
5.	Ratu Epeli Nailatikau	October 2008 – March 2012
6.	Ratu Viliame Seruvakula	February 2024 – present
