= Jope Seniloli =

Ratu Jope Naucabalavu Seniloli (14 June 1939 – 28 June 2015) was a Fijian chief who held the title of Turaga Taukei Naua and who served as Fiji's vice-president from 25 March 2001 to 29 November 2004, when he was forced to resign following his conviction for treason on 6 August 2004, and the rejection of his appeal early in November.

== Biography ==
Seniloli was appointed vice-president in 2000 as an apparent gesture of appeasement towards the supporters of the 2000 coup which deposed the lawfully elected government of President Ratu Sir Kamisese Mara and Prime Minister Mahendra Chaudhry. The 6 August 2004 verdict found Seniloli guilty of unlawfully proclaiming himself President during the coup, and of illegally swearing in cabinet ministers, including George Speight, the chief instigator of the coup, as Prime Minister. Seniloli's lawyer, Mehboob Raza, maintained that he had done so only "under duress," at gunpoint, a defence rejected by High Court Justice Nazhat Shameem, who agreed with the state prosecutor that Seniloli had known of the coup plot in advance and had deliberately aided and abetted it. Shameem said that she had originally intended to sentence Seniloli to six years' imprisonment, but had opted for a four-year sentence instead, taking account of his many years of service to Fiji, including thirty-three years as a schoolteacher.

Along with Seniloli, the Deputy Speaker of the House of Representatives, Ratu Rakuita Vakalalabure, and three other defendants, were sentenced to terms of between one and six years for the same offence.

In a controversial move, Attorney-General Qoriniasi Bale announced on 29 November 2004 that he had decided to release Seniloli from prison on medical grounds, a decision which angered the Labour Party. "The FLP is outraged by the jailed VP's early release from prison," declared Senator Jokapeci Koroi, the national president of the Labour Party. "This is nothing but a conspiracy by the Government to save those who are in positions of power." Koroi called the release of Seniloli, who had served less than four months of his four-year term, an "act of defiance to subvert the course of justice and the rule of law." Reverend Akuila Yabaki of the Citizens Constitutional Forum also criticized the release.

The military forces were also displeased, and took what was widely seen as an extraordinary step by issuing a public statement. Captain Neumi Leweni of the Republic of Fiji Military Forces media cell called the early release "an insult to our sense of justice and the rule of law" and a "riot." "We are falling fast into the abyss and if nothing is done about this quickly, we will continue falling, never to recover," Leweni said. He and other senior military said they believed the release of Ratu Jope was a political ploy to gain the support of "the same type of people who gathered in droves at the parliamentary complex in 2000" – a reference to the supporters of the coup. The officers predicted that if the Attorney General was not reined in quickly, there could be "a return to the mayhem of 2000." Leweni's judgement that Ratu Seniloli's release threatened national security was subsequently backed up by Commodore Frank Bainimarama, the Commander of the Armed Forces.

Joji Kotobalavu, a spokesman for Prime Minister Laisenia Qarase, rejected the criticism and said that the military had acted improperly by issuing a political statement. The senior officers should have notified the Home Affairs Ministry of their feelings privately, he said, adding that by publicly airing their opinions, the military was creating a climate of "uncertainty," leading people to wonder whether the government or the military was running the country.

Ratu Seniloli's early release was coupled with his resignation from office. Although not stated, this was believed to be a condition of his release. A government spokesman said that Ratu Seniloli would receive a pension equivalent to 30 percent of his vice-presidential salary.

By law, prisoners are not eligible for release until half their sentence has been served, but a special case was made for Seniloli due to the poor state of his health. He was released into "compulsory supervision," under which he was required to report daily to the police, and was not allowed to change his address or travel outside of Fiji without permission.

The Fijian Constitution assigned a purely ceremonial role to vice-president, with one important exception: he assumeed the powers and duties of the presidency in the event of the President being unable to carry out his duties. With the 84-year-old president, Ratu Josefa Iloilo suffering from Parkinson's disease and requiring frequent visits to Australia for medical treatment, the resignation of the vice-president left Fiji with no one to take Iloilo's place should he had become incapacitated, and the appointment of a successor was considered a priority. On 15 December 2004, the Great Council of Chiefs approved President Iloilo's choice of Ratu Joni Madraiwiwi as the new vice-president of Fiji.

- See main article: 2006 Fiji presidential election

On 16 February 2006, the Fiji Village news service claimed that some Tailevu chiefs were quietly campaigning for the Great Council of Chiefs to reinstate Seniloli as vice-president. The Council was due to meet as an electoral college on 8 March to choose the president and vice-president, whose terms were due to expire. Without naming Seniloli, the military expressed its opposition to any coup-convict being appointed president or vice-president. Seniloli himself, however, revealed to Fiji Village on 22 February that as he was still technically serving his prison sentence extramurally, he was not eligible for reinstatement.

He died on 28 June 2015 at the age of 76.

Preceded by Ratu Josefa Iloilo	Vice-President of Fiji; 2001–2004	Succeeded by Ratu Joni Madraiwiwi
