= Josefa Iloilo =

President of Fiji from 2000 to 2009

His Excellency Ratu Josefa Iloilo CF MBE MSD KStJ
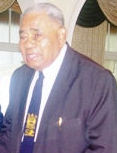
- Iloilo in 2008/2009

President of Fiji
- In office 4 January 2007 – 30 July 2009
- Prime Minister: Frank Bainimarama (acting)
- Vice President: Epeli Nailatikau
- Preceded by: Frank Bainimarama (acting)
- Succeeded by: Epeli Nailatikau (acting)
- In office 13 July 2000 – 5 December 2006
- Prime Minister: Tevita Momoedonu; Laisenia Qarase; Tevita Momoedonu; Laisenia Qarase
- Vice President: Jope Seniloli; Joni Madraiwiwi
- Preceded by: Kamisese Mara
- Succeeded by: Frank Bainimarama (acting)

Personal details
- Born: 29 December 1920 Vuda, Ba, Colony of Fiji
- Died: 6 February 2011 (aged 90) Suva, Fiji
- Party: Alliance
- Spouse: Salaseini Kavunono
- Relations: Samisoni Tikoinasau (son-in-law); Henry Speight (grandson)
- Profession: Teacher

Ratu Josefa Iloilovatu Uluivuda, CF, MBE, MSD, KStJ (29 December 1920 – 6 February 2011) was a Fijian politician who served as the 3rd President of Fiji from 2000 until 2009 following the 2000 Fijian coup d'état, excluding a brief period from 5 December 2006 to 4 January 2007 amid the 2006 coup d'état. He held the traditional title of Tui Vuda, the paramount chief of the Vuda district in Ba Province on Fiji's northwest coast. Like many Fijian people, he rarely used his surname and was known simply as Josefa Iloilo. He announced on 28 July 2009 that he would be leaving office on 30 July. At the age of 88, he was the world's oldest incumbent head of state.

On 5 December 2006, Commodore Frank Bainimarama, Commander of the Republic of Fiji Military Forces and former Acting President amid the 2000 coup d'état, seized power in a new coup d'état and assumed presidential powers. This followed failed attempts on Iloilo's part to mediate a solution to the long-running impasse between the military and the government of Prime Minister Laisenia Qarase. However, his powers were restored by Bainimarama on 4 January 2007. Iloilo also endorsed Bainimarama's coup on the same day, in his first public address since the coup. He appointed Bainimarama as Prime Minister the following day.

After Fiji's Court of Appeal had ruled that the removal of Prime Minister Laisenia Qarase and the appointment of Fiji's interim regime following the military coup in 2006 was unlawful, on 10 April 2009 Iloilo dismissed the judges and abrogated the country's constitution. Iloilo claimed to have the "full support" of the security forces and directed the military to take "all reasonable steps" to maintain law and order.

== Career ==
Iloilo worked as a school teacher from 1939 to 1968 and civil service administrator, which he introduced the Boy Scouts Movement to the country, establishing scout troops on the Fijian islands. He later became a member of the House of Representatives. He subsequently served as a Senator in the 1990s, and was President of the Senate prior to his becoming Vice-President of Fiji on 18 January 1999. He was in this position under President Ratu Sir Kamisese Mara in 1999 and 2000, when Prime Minister Mahendra Chaudhry's government was overthrown by Fijian nationalists led by George Speight in the Fiji coup of 2000. He was sworn in as President on 13 July 2000, but legal experts consider that he was constitutionally the President as of 29 May, the date on which Ratu Mara had been removed from office by the military, and to which his resignation in December that year had been backdated. Iloilo refused to intervene directly in the disputes among politicians, but quietly reached out to disaffected factions, including the Indo-Fijian community. In 2001, he persuaded the military to allow a return to democracy.

== Political controversies ==
On 20 June 2005, the Fiji Times reported that "a reliable source" close to the government had accused Iloilo of refusing to discipline Commodore Frank Bainimarama, the Commander of the Republic of Fiji Military Forces, for his public criticism of government policies. The source said that Iloilo had refused repeated requests from the Home Affairs Minister, Josefa Vosanibola, to take disciplinary measures against Bainimarama for publicly opposing the early release of prisoners convicted of coup-related offences, as well as the proposed establishment of a Reconciliation and Unity Commission (called the "Reconciliation Bull" by Bainimarama) with the power (subject to presidential approval) to compensate victims and pardon convicted participants in the coup. The source said that the President's refusal to act was making the Home Affairs Minister look foolish and incompetent, and suggested that Iloilo was not following the Constitution. As President, Iloilo was the Commander-in-Chief of the Military, but, according to the source, was required by Section 96 of the Constitution to act on the advice of the appropriate Cabinet Minister, in this case the Home Affairs Minister.

According to an unconfirmed report in the Fiji Times on 25 June, Iloilo and his Vice-President, Ratu Joni Madraiwiwi, had asked Prime Minister Laisenia Qarase to withdraw the government's controversial legislation to establish a Reconciliation and Unity Commission, with the power to compensate victims and pardon perpetrators of the 2000 coup. The Prime Minister reportedly replied that he would "consider" the matter. Spokesmen for the President and Prime Minister declined to confirm or deny the report, which was written by freelance journalist Wainikiti Bogidrau, the wife of senior army officer, Major Setareki Bogidrau. On 27 June, the Fiji Labour Party claimed on its website to have known of the meeting before the article was published, and further alleged that the Prime Minister had intended to ask the President to use his position as Commander-in-chief of the Military to curb Bainimarama's public criticism of the bill, and that he was taken aback by the President's request to withdraw the legislation.

In his traditional speech opening Parliament on 1 August, Iloilo said that the government had introduced it for the purpose of fostering unity and stability. His speech welcomed the public debate, saying that reconciliation was "a difficult but necessary process", and it called on parliamentarians to uphold the law. He also said "As parliamentarians you must carefully examine your conscience on the deliberation of sensitive issues and not be swayed by divisive racial remarks which have been a common and unfortunate hallmark of debate in our Parliament."

== Views on the chiefly system ==
In an opening address to the Great Council of Chiefs on 27 July 2005, Iloilo told his fellow-chiefs that they needed to adapt to the modern era, or else risk "simply becoming decorations."

Iloilo recalled warnings from Fiji's first modern statesman, Ratu Sir Lala Sukuna (1888–1958), that the chiefs risked becoming an irrelevance if they did not take their leadership role seriously and prove that they had the qualifications and authority that their ancestors had possessed. "We should never forget Ratu Sukuna's warning about the dangers of chiefs simply becoming decorations. He said if that happened they were finished. He declared chiefs could only be sure of their people continuing to follow them as long as they appreciated that chiefly authority was better than anyone else's." He called on chiefs to be educated and trained for leadership. "Before we are in a position to advise our people on the right course we must also make sure that we have the knowledge and the awareness required to fulfill this duty properly. If we do not have this, we can not lead. When we are equipped with leadership skills that complement traditional rank, we are appropriately prepared to provide the inspiration, the motivation and guidance expected of us."

== Personal life ==
Iloilo was a lay-preacher for many years, and was Vice-President of the Methodist Church of Fiji and Rotuma in 1997 and 1998. In September 2004, he hosted a state dinner for the Argentine-born American evangelist Luis Palau. He delivered the opening address at Fiji's National Day of Prayer on 15 May 2005. He called on Fijians to seek God's wisdom to find the way forward for the nation, and said he considered prayer to be "as important to our nation as breath is to our lives". Reminding Christians of the Jewish Year of jubilee, a year for cancelling all debts owed by one's fellow-man, Iloilo called on the people to pursue both personal and national reconciliation and forgiveness, saying that they would reap what they sowed. "Whatever you sow you shall reap. If you sow the seeds of harmony, peace and goodwill you will reap the fruits thereof. If you sow the seeds of discord, hatred and injustice you cannot expect to reap good results."

== Second term: 2006–2009 ==
Speaking on condition of anonymity, a member of Iloilo's family told the Fiji Times on 29 November 2005 that he did not intend to seek another term when his first term ended on 13 March 2006. The family member said that Iloilo had already hinted of his plans during a speech at the 2005 Fiji Business Excellence Awards in Nadi, in which he said it might be his last official function. His plans to retire were motivated not by concerns about his health, but by his desire to spend more time with his family and tribe, of which he was the Paramount Chief, the source said at the time. On 2 February 2006, however, the office of the Great Council of Chiefs announced that Iloilo had indicated his willingness to serve for another term. He celebrated his 85th birthday at Lautoka's First Landing Resort on 29 December 2005.

The Great Council of Chiefs met at the Tradewinds Convention Centre in Lami on 8 March and re-elected Iloilo to another five-year term. On 5 December 2006 Commodore Frank Bainimarama, Commander of the Republic of Fiji Military Forces, seized power in a coup d'état and assumed presidential powers. This followed failed attempts on Iloilo's part to mediate a solution to the long-running impasse between the military and the government of Prime Minister Laisenia Qarase. However, his powers were restored by Bainimarama on 4 January 2007. Iloilo also endorsed Bainimarama's coup on the same day, in his first public address since the coup. He appointed Bainimarama as Prime Minister on 5 January.

=== Suspension of Fijian Constitution ===
The Court of Appeal ruled on 9 April 2009 that Bainimarama's government was illegal; the court also ruled that Iloilo should appoint a new Prime Minister, while specifically excluding both Bainimarama and Qarase. Iloilo then announced on 10 April that he was abrogating the constitution and dismissing the judges; according to Iloilo, the court's decision left Fiji without a government, but "the machinery of government must continue". He said that he would soon appoint a new interim government and that a new election would be held by September 2014. He subsequently re-appointed Prime Minister Bainimarama, with a mandate to pursue his reforms and bring about democratic elections no later than 2014.

Prominent Fiji academic Brij Lal, co-author of the abrogated Constitution, voiced strong criticism against the President's actions:

"This was all a total charade, just a hoax that spits in the face of democracy. The President is a senile old man, a puppet in the pocket of the military. It was planned all along that he would look after Bainimarama and strengthen the regime, and no justice would be done."

== Retirement and death ==
Interim Prime Minister Bainimarama announced on 28 July 2009, that President Iloilo had informed him that afternoon of his intention to retire from office on 30 July. No reason was given, but media outlets pointed out that at the age of 88, he was the world's oldest Head of State. Vice-President Ratu Epeli Nailatikau would serve as Acting President until Cabinet announced, and the Chief Justice formally appointed a substantive President, as stated by Acting Prime Minister Bainimarama.

Iloilo, was at the time of his retirement as the President of Fiji 88 years old and there had for a long time been speculation about the state of his health. He suffered from Parkinson's disease and during his presidency required regular medical treatment in Australia. lloilo died on 6 February 2011 at the age of 90.

Regnal titles
Preceded by Josaia Tavaiqia	Tui Vuda; 1997–2011	Incumbent
Political offices
Preceded by Josaia Tavaiqia; Inoke Takiveikata	Vice-President of Fiji; 1997–2000	Succeeded by Jope Seniloli
Preceded by Kamisese Mara	President of Fiji; 2000–2006	Succeeded by Frank Bainimarama; Acting
Preceded by Frank Bainimarama; Acting	President of Fiji; 2007–2009	Succeeded by Epeli Nailatikau; Acting
