= Great Council of Chiefs =

1876–2012 & 2023– Fijian constitutional body

Great Council Of Chiefs
- "Bose Levu Vakaturaga"
- Founder: Arthur Hamilton-Gordon, 1st Baron Stanmore
- Headquarters: Veiuto Parliament Complex, Suva, Fiji
- Members: 55
- Chairman: Viliame Seruvakula
- Deputy Chair: Tevita Mara

The Great Council of Chiefs (Fijian: Bose Levu Vakaturaga) is a Fijian constitutional body. It previously existed from 1876 to March 2012 and was restored in May 2023.

It is different from the House of Chiefs, a larger body that includes all hereditary chiefs, although membership of the two bodies overlapped to a considerable extent. The Great Council of Chiefs in its most recent form was established under Section 116 of the now-defunct 1997 Constitution, but it actually predated the Constitution by many years, having been established by the British colonial rulers as an advisory body in 1876, two years after Fiji was ceded to the United Kingdom.

The current chairperson is Ratu Viliame Seruvakula.

== History ==
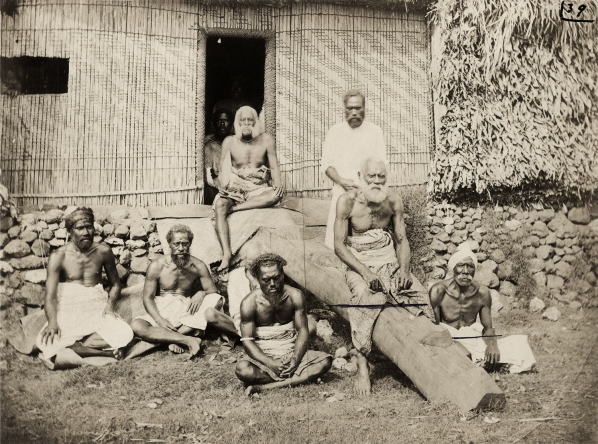
Photograph of a meeting of the Great Council of Chiefs in Waikava in 1876. The Great Council of Chiefs meeting at Waikava, opened by Governor Gordon on 20 November 1876, lasted nearly 3 weeks. Gordon outlined his plans for indirect rule and established procedures for future meetings. Numerous resolutions were adopted and at the end of the meeting a letter to the British Queen was signed by the principal chiefs. Various people came to the climax of the meeting which included a feast, dancing and a solevu (ritual festival with exchange of goods). The image shows senior members of the Great Council of Chiefs, with Cakobau seated at the top of the ramp above his brother Ratu Josefa Celua. The chief to his left, wearing a white masi turban is likely Musudroka, the Vunivalu of Rewa.

The Great Council of Chiefs (GCC) was established in 1876 under the governorship of Sir Arthur Gordon (in office: 1875-1880). The body originated following consultations with chiefs, who advised Sir Arthur on how best to govern the colony's indigenous population. In the words of anthropologist Robert Norton, it "embodied the privileged relationship of trust and protection established between the Fijians and the British".

During the era of British colonial rule (1874 to 1970), meetings of the Great Council of Chiefs took place every year or two, "with rich ceremonial protocol", and chaired by the British governor. Council members advised the governor with regards to policy on indigenous affairs. Until 1963 the GCC also selected indigenous representatives for the colonial Parliament. Its nominees to Parliament in the 1950s and early 1960s included Ratu Sir Lala Sukuna, Ratu Sir Kamisese Mara, Ratu George Cakobau, Ratu Edward Cakobau and Ratu Penaia Ganilau, who would become leaders in government. In 1963, this function of the Council was abolished as indigenous Fijians obtained the right to elect their representatives to Parliament.

In the 1950s, the Council ceased to be reserved for chiefs; its "membership [...] was broadened to allow representation of trade unions and other urban organizations". All members remained indigenous, however.

Fiji's first Constitution, adopted upon independence in 1970, gave the Council the right to nominate eight of the twenty-two members of the Senate.

Following the 1987 military coups conducted by Lieutenant Colonel Sitiveni Rabuka, the Council reverted to being an exclusively aristocratic body, its membership reserved to high chiefs. Rabuka argued that hereditary chiefs should retain paramount decision-making power.

The 1990 Constitution thus enhanced the Council's power, authorising the GCC to appoint 24 of the Senate's 34 members, and thus making the Senate a GCC-dominated body. The Council would also, henceforth, appoint the President of Fiji and the Vice-President.

The 1997 Constitution reduced the GCC's representation in the Senate to 14 members (out of 32), but recognised its right to name Presidents and Vice-Presidents.

From the late 1980s onwards, the Great Council of Chiefs was compromised by manipulation by the government. Following the coup of 2000, however, it worked, with mixed success, to regain its independence. In 2001, it dismissed 1987 coup leader and former prime minister Sitiveni Rabuka from its own chairmanship, in the midst of allegations about his possible involvement in the coup of 2000. It also cut its former ties with the Soqosoqo ni Vakavulewa ni Taukei political party (which it had originally sponsored in the early 1990s), and declared its intention to eschew party politics in the future; although individual members of the Council would, of course, remain free to participate in politics as individuals.

In June 2004, the Great Council of Chiefs was plunged into crisis when the Government decided not to reappoint Ratu Epeli Ganilau as one of six Government representatives on the Great Council; the Cakaudrove Provincial Council did not give him one of their three seats either. These decisions had the effect of prematurely ending Ganilau's term as Chairman of the Council, as its regulations require the chairman to be a member. It is thought that Ganilau's open disagreement with several senior government figures, including Vice-President Ratu Jope Seniloli and Information Minister Simione Kaitani, along with fears that he was undermining the neutrality of the Great Council to use it as a platform from which to advance his own political ambitions, were factors in the Cakaudrove Provincial Council's decision. Ganilau was replaced by Ratu Ovini Bokini, who was thought to be more sympathetic to the government. Bokini was re-elected to a full three-year term on 27 July 2005, and Ratu Sakiusa Makutu of Nadroga-Navosa was chosen as his Deputy, succeeding Ro Jone Mataitini, who decided not to seek re-election.

Despite Fiji's membership of the Commonwealth of Nations at that time as a republic, the Great Council recognised Queen Elizabeth II as its traditional Queen or paramount chief.

On 20 April 2005, the Fijian government announced plans to grant greater formal powers to the Great Council. This proposal was immediately opposed by Fiji Labour Party leader Mahendra Chaudhry, who said it would lead to "dual government" in Fiji, and also drew criticism from Ratu Epeli Ganilau. The former chairman of the Great Council, now the interim president of the National Alliance Party, said that he believed that the powers of the Council were already sufficient.

In a controversial move, the Great Council decided on 28 July 2005 to endorse the government's Reconciliation, Tolerance, and Unity Bill, which aimed to establish a commission empowered to compensate victims and to pardon perpetrators of the 2000 coup. Opponents, including former Great Council chairman Ganilau, labelled this as just a legal device to free government supporters who had been convicted and imprisoned on coup-related charges.

In April 2007 Commodore Frank Bainimarama, author of the December 2006 military coup, suspended the Council. It was not, however, abolished. In February 2008, the interim government announced that Bainimarama, as Minister for Indigenous Affairs, was appointing himself as Chairman of the Council. As Chairman, he would appoint all other members, acting on the recommendation of the provincial councils, and would have the authority to discipline, suspend, or dismiss any member.

The interim government asked provinces to submit nominees for the Great Council of Chiefs by 15 July 2008. If certain provinces did not provide nominees, Bainimarama would name GCC members to represent those provinces himself.

On 5 August 2008, it was announced that the Great Council of Chiefs was ready to reconvene. It would be composed of three chiefs from each of the fourteen provinces, and would be chaired by the Minister for Fijian Affairs, who at that time was Commodore Bainimarama.

On 14 March 2012, Bainimarama announced that President Ratu Epeli Nailatikau had "approved decrees that formally de-establish the Great Council of the Chiefs". He accused the Council of having "become politicised to the detriment of Fiji's pursuit of a common and equal citizenry".

The 2022 Fijian general election saw Fiji elect a hung parliament. Four parties won seats in the Fijian Parliament: the governing FijiFirst party of then-Prime Minister Frank Bainimarama, the new People's Alliance party of former prime minister Sitiveni Rabuka, the National Federation Party (NFP) of Biman Prasad and the Social Democratic Liberal Party (SODELPA) of Bill Gavoka. While the NFP had already agreed to support the People's Alliance before the election, SODELPA had not declared a position prior to the election and thus became the kingmaker. SODELPA subsequently joined the People's Alliance-NFP coalition under certain conditions, one of which was bringing back the Great Council of Chiefs. These conditions were agreed upon.

In April 2023, President Wiliame Katonivere confirmed that the Council would return and hold its first meeting in May 2023. The reconstitution ceremony took place on the island of Bau on May 24, 2023. National champion Ratu Banuve Tabakaucoro received the honour of welcoming the state President and Prime Minister with the ceremonial offering of kava. Ratu Viliame Seruvakula was elected as Chairman of the Council in 2024.

== Historical composition ==
The Great Council had most recently consisted of 55 members, mainly hereditary chiefs along with some specially qualified commoners. The composition was as follows:

- The president of Fiji (ex officio)
- The vice-president of Fiji (ex officio)
- The prime minister of Fiji (ex officio)
- 6 members appointed by the president, on the advice of the Minister for Fijian Affairs
- 42 provincial councillors (3 chosen by each of Fiji's 14 provincial councils)
- 3 representatives of the Council of Rotuma
- 1 life member (Sitiveni Rabuka)

These arrangements came into being on 9 June 1990. Previously, 22 parliamentarians holding seats allocated to indigenous Fijians held membership ex officio in the Great Council of Chiefs, along with 2 or 3 representatives from each of the 14 provincial councils. In addition, there were 8 chiefs and 7 commoners chosen by the Minister for Fijian Affairs. Following two military coups in 1987, the Council decided to abolish the right of elected parliamentarians to hold ex officio council membership, and to reduce the number of government appointees.

Except for the life member (1987 Fiji coups d'état leader and current Prime Minister of Fiji, Sitiveni Rabuka), all members served four-year terms.

The Council also recognized Elizabeth II, former Queen of Fiji, as Paramount Chief, but she was not formally a member of the Council.

== Constitutional role ==
In the 2013 Constitution, there has not been any role assigned to the Great Council of Chiefs.

According to the 1997 Constitution, the Great Council of Chiefs had two major powers:

- It functioned as an electoral college to elect the president and vice-president of Fiji, for a five-year term. In certain circumstances prescribed by the Constitution, it might remove the president or vice-president from office, in the case of felony, incompetence, negligence, or being unable to carry out their constitutional duties.
- It chose 14 of the 32 members of the Senate. (Although senators were ceremonially appointed by the president, his role was a mere formality: the Constitution obligated him to accept and appoint the 14 nominees chosen by the council, as well as 18 senators nominated by other institutions (Prime Minister 9, Leader of the Opposition 8, Council of Rotuma 1). Filling nearly half of the seats in the Senate, the nominees of the Great Council of Chiefs had an effective veto if they voted as a block, as they were almost certain to be joined by enough of the other senators to muster a majority. They did not always vote as a block, however: Fiji's chiefs are a very diverse body. In practice, the Great Council of Chiefs delegated its prerogative of choosing Senators to Fiji's fourteen provincial councils, with each province choosing one senator.

In addition to these constitutionally mandated functions, the Great Council of Chiefs had other roles that might from time to time be prescribed by law. In addition, it was considered almost compulsory for the government to consult and secure the approval of the Council before making major changes to the Constitution, although nothing in the Constitution required it to do so.

== See also ==
- Malvatu Mauri (House of Chiefs) of Vanuatu
- House of Ariki
