= Vice-President of Fiji =

Defunct political office in the Government of Fiji

Vice-President of the Republic of Fiji
- Coat of arms of the Republic of Fiji

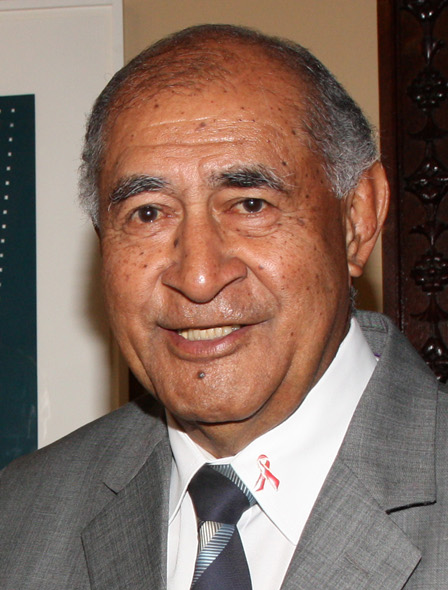
- Epeli Nailatikau; Last office holder
- Appointer: Great Council of Chiefs (1990–2009); President of Fiji (2009–13)
- Formation: 1990
- First holder: Josaia Tavaiqia; Inoke Takiveikata
- Final holder: Epeli Nailatikau
- Abolished: 6 September 2013 (permanently vacant since July 30, 2009)
- Superseded by: Chief Justice of Fiji

The position of the vice-president of the Republic of Fiji was created in 1990, to provide a constitutional successor to the president of Fiji, in the event of the latter's death or resignation, or of his otherwise being unable to carry out his duties. The vice-president's role in government was mostly ceremonial as its sole purpose was to replace the president in his absence, death, or inability to hold office. The vice-presidency was abolished in 2013, with the powers of the office transferred to the Chief Justice of Fiji, who has a dormant commission which is triggered when the position of president of Fiji is either vacant or when the president is either absent or ill.

== History of the office ==
Under the terms the 1990 Constitution of Fiji, the vice-presidency was divided between two persons, styled first vice-president and second vice-president, respectively, but a single person held the office of vice-president from 1999, when the 1997 Constitution of Fiji came into effect.

Under the terms of the 1997 Constitution, the vice-president was appointed by the Great Council of Chiefs, after consultation with the prime minister. In April 2009, however, the Constitution was suspended, following the earlier suspension of the Great Council of Chiefs in April 2007. Six days after the suspension of the Constitution, the government issued a decree stating that the vice-president would henceforth be appointed by the president. Ratu Epeli Nailatikau was appointed vice-president the following day.

Under the terms of the 2013 Constitution, the vice-presidency was abolished, with its duties and powers transferred to the chief justice.

Being appointees of the all-indigenous Great Council of Chiefs, Fiji's vice-presidents, like its presidents, have all been indigenous Fijians (of chiefly rank). In 2007, Reverend Akuila Yabaki, Director of the Citizens Constitutional Forum, suggested that "the time may be right now to allow a person from any race to take up this position".

== Vice-presidents ==
=== First vice-presidents ===
No.	Portrait	First Vice-President	Took office	Left office	Time in office	Party	President
	Josaia Tavaiqia	Ratu Sir; Josaia Tavaiqia (1931–1997)	1990	2 June 1992	2 years, 153 days	Independent	Penaia Ganilau
	Kamisese Mara	Ratu Sir; Kamisese Mara (1920–2004)	2 June 1992	15 December 1993	1 year, 196 days	Independent	Ratu Sir Penaia Ganilau
Vacant (15 December 1993 – 12 January 1994)
	Josaia Tavaiqia	Ratu Sir; Josaia Tavaiqia (1931–1997)	12 January 1994	17 November 1997 †	309 days	Independent	Ratu Sir Kamisese Mara
	Inoke Takiveikata	Ratu; Inoke Takiveikata	17 November 1997	18 January 1999	1 year, 62 days	Independent	Ratu Sir Kamisese Mara

=== Second vice-presidents ===
No.	Portrait	Second Vice-President	Took office	Left office	Time in office	Party	President
	Inoke Takiveikata	Ratu; Inoke Takiveikata	1990	2 June 1992	2 years, 153 days	Independent	Ratu Sir Penaia Ganilau
	Josaia Tavaiqia	Ratu Sir; Josaia Tavaiqia (1931–1997)	2 June 1992	12 January 1994	1 year, 224 days	Independent	Ratu Sir Penaia Ganilau; Ratu Sir Kamisese Mara
	Inoke Takiveikata	Ratu; Inoke Takiveikata	12 January 1994	17 November 1997	3 years, 309 days	Independent	Ratu Sir Kamisese Mara
	Josefa Iloilo	Ratu; Josefa Iloilo (1920–2011)	17 November 1997	18 January 1999	1 year, 62 days	Independent	Ratu Sir Kamisese Mara

=== Vice-presidents (single office) ===
No.	Portrait	Vice-President	Took office	Left office	Time in office	Party	President
	Josefa Iloilo	Ratu; Josefa Iloilo (1920–2011)	18 January 1999	29 May 2000	1 year, 132 days	Independent	Ratu Sir Kamisese Mara
Vacant (29 May 2000 – 25 March 2001)
	Jope Seniloli	Ratu; Jope Seniloli (1939–2015)	25 May 2001	29 November 2004	3 years, 188 days	Independent	Josefa Iloilo
	Joni Madraiwiwi	Ratu; Joni Madraiwiwi (1957–2016)	15 December 2004	5 December 2006	1 year, 355 days	Independent	Josefa Iloilo
Vacant (5 December 2006 – 17 April 2009)
	Epeli Nailatikau	Ratu Brigadier general (Rtd); Epeli Nailatikau (1941–2026)	17 April 2009	30 July 2009	104 days	Independent	Josefa Iloilo
Vacant (30 July 2009 – 6 September 2013)
Abolished (6 September 2013 – present)
