= Angie Heffernan =

Angenette (Angie) Heffernan is a Fijian human rights and democracy activist and executive director of the Pacific Centre for Public Integrity (PCPI). Prior to PCPI she was a prominent regional environmental political campaigner for Greenpeace Australia for eight years, during which she campaigned against Japanese plutonium shipments in the South Pacific. She established the Pacific Centre for Public Integrity with Suliana Siwatibau and social justice campaigner Aisake Casimira to combat perceived corruption and bad governance in the Pacific region, She is known for her strong stance against political and state corruption and for her outspoken opposition to the 2006 Fijian coup d'état.

Prior to the 2006 coup she campaigned against the early release of those involved in the 2000 Fijian coup d'état, and against the government's Reconciliation, Tolerance, and Unity Bill.

== The 2006 coup ==
On 15 December 2006, Heffernan strongly criticized Fiji Human Rights Commission (FHRC) Director Shaista Shameem for failing to oppose the coup and human rights violations allegedly committed by the country's military rulers. On 28 December, she called on Shameem to resign, claiming that the FHRC had done nothing to help six activists who claimed to have been detained and assaulted at Suva's Queen Elizabeth Barracks in the early hours of 25 December. On 4 January 2007, Heffernan condemned a report written by Shameem excusing the Military for overthrowing a government that was "illegally constituted."

Heffernan also voiced fears that the country could be slipping into dictatorship, the Fiji Times reported on 16 December.

On 20 December, she spoke out against granting immunity to Military officers and soldiers, saying it would set a dangerous precedent that would legitimize Military coups. On 21 January, she criticized President Ratu Josefa Iloilo for granting immunity to the Military Commander, Commodore Frank Bainimarama and all others associated with the coup and with the interim government formed in early January, saying that the President had acted unconstitutionally, the Fiji Sun quoted her as saying.

== Into hiding ==
On 24 January 2007, Heffernan announced that threats from the Military had led to the closure of the PCPI office for one week. The next day, Suliana Siwatibau, the PCPI chairperson, said that Heffernan had been threatened and that the Military was looking for her, which Land Force Commander Colonel Pita Driti confirmed. Heffernan and fellow-activist Laisa Digitaki had been making "inciteful" comments, he claimed. Later that day, Heffernan said she feared for her life and that of her three children, and had gone into hiding.

The police announced on 28 January that they had begun an investigation into Heffernan and Digitaki on the basis of a formal complaint from the Military.

Heffernan was arrested by soldiers in civilian clothes at a Sigatoka hotel on 30 January. Apprehended at the same hotel was another government critic, Tupou Draunidalo, vice-president of the Fiji Law Society. Both women were taken in for interrogation by the Military and police. Police Director of Uniform Operations Jair Khan said that Heffernan could be charged with breaching the Public Order Act.

In April 2007 the High Court of Fiji ordered the military regime not to interfere with Heffernan's freedom of speech. In June 2007 the Fiji Court of Appeal overturned the order. Shortly afterwards, her lawyer was deported from Fiji by the military regime.
