= People's Charter for Change, Peace and Progress =

2008 Fijian proposed supplement to the constitution

The People's Charter for Change, Peace and Progress (initially, People's Charter for Change and Progress) was a proposed legal document which would have complemented the 1997 Constitution of Fiji. It would have established compulsory guidelines for any government policy in Fiji over the coming years. The People's Charter was due to be completed and come into force prior to the scheduled 2014 general election.

A draft version of the Charter was released to the public in early August 2008. Input from the public was to be received in August and September. Council member Filimoni Kau stated that objections would be considered, but that the Charter would go ahead in any case.

== Context ==
The People's Charter was the brainchild of interim Prime Minister Frank Bainimarama, head of the Republic of Fiji Military Forces, who overthrew the elected Prime Minister Laisenia Qarase in December 2006. Bainimarama alleged that Qarase was corrupt and racist, and declared that a People's Charter was necessary in order to prevent corruption and racism within future elected governments.

== Content and aims of the Charter ==
=== Stated objective ===
In April 2007, a draft version of the Charter was published. The draft, intended as a general presentation of the future Charter's aims, began with a statement that "Fiji’s politics and overall governance have been dominated by and deeply mired in divisive, race-based politics, policies, and institutions". Consequently, the text authors state, "Fiji needs to become a more progressive and a truly democratic nation; a country in which its leaders, at all levels, emphasize national unity, racial harmony and the social and economic advancement of all communities regardless of race or ethnic origin."

The overall objective of the Charter is defined as follows:

To rebuild Fiji into a non-racial, culturally-vibrant and united, well-governed, truly democratic nation that seeks progress, and prosperity through merit-based equality of opportunity, and peace.

Much emphasis is laid on the necessity to prioritise national unity over the politics of separate ethnic communities.

In August 2008, shortly before the Charter was due to be released to the public, it was announced that it recommended a change in the name of Fiji's citizens. If the proposal were adopted, all citizens of Fiji, whatever their ethnicity, would be called "Fijians". At present, the word "Fijian" does not denote a nationality, and refers exclusively to indigenous Fijians. Citizens of Fiji are referred to as "Fiji Islanders". The proposal would change the English name of indigenous Fijians from "Fijians" to itaukei, the Fijian word for indigenous Fijians.

Archbishop Petero Mataca summed up the Charter by saying it would "reinforce the quality and sustainability of democracy in Fiji" and "provide a clearer vision of the principles and values we want to live by".

=== Short-term consequences ===
Commodore Bainimarama said that the People's Charter would prevent any candidate for the 2009 general election from campaigning on racist and divisive policies. Such candidates would be barred from taking part in the election.

"That will be taken care of by the charter so if anybody with Qarase-like policies comes in, the charter will automatically remove them."

Asked by a journalist whether Qarase would be allowed to take part in the election, Bainimarama said he would: "That is also in the commitment we had yesterday and that was [sic] always been there".

In May 2008, Bainimarama added that the military would enforce future governments' compliance with the provisions of the Charter.

=== Methodology ===
The Charter was prepared by a National Council for Building a Better Fiji (NCBBF), supposed to be "broadly representative of Fiji society (including leaders and representatives from the civil society including NGOs, the private sector, religious and community organisations, employers/workers and youth organisations, and the political parties)".

The NCBBF held its first meeting on January 16, 2008. It reportedly began with an "in depth" assessment of the state of the nation.

Officially, the NCBBF's work on the Charter is overseen by an independent monitoring group, which reports directly to President Ratu Josefa Iloilo. The monitoring group was chaired by Sela Molisa, a member of the Parliament of Vanuatu. Reverend Amy Chambers is also a member of the monitoring group. The NCBBF itself is composed of three task teams, one (co-chaired by Ratu Josefa Serulagilagi and Attorney General Aiyaz Sayed-Khaiyum) tasked with focusing on good governance, another (co-chaired by Ratu Josateki Nawalowalo and Finance Minister Mahendra Chaudhry) on economic growth, and the third (co-chaired by Loraini Tevi and Health Minister Dr. Jiko Luveni) on "social cultural identity and nation building."

On June 24, 2008, the NCBBF made several recommendations, all of them in line with Bainimarama's original aims. These included:

- abolishing communal electoral rolls, and replacing them with proportional representation
- abolishing compulsory voting
- reducing the voting age to 18
- new anti-discrimination laws.

The NCBBF advocated implementing electoral reforms before holding any election. A representative of the Council stated: "The NCBBF is of the firm view that change is long overdue and that Fiji urgently needs a new electoral system based on equal suffrage - that is one person, one vote, equal value."

On August 5, 2008, the NCBBF announced that it had endorsed a draft Charter document, which was to be released shortly thereafter. Fijilive reported that the NCBBF planned to "gauge the views of the people on the draft Charter via a public awareness campaign over the next six weeks". Meetings would be held in public venues, the Charter would be advertised in the media, and there would be "consultations by public relations teams at grassroots level in all the villages and settlements throughout the country".

==== Implementation ====
It was unclear how the People's Charter would be officially implemented. The interim government announced that the public would be consulted, but no official reference to a referendum was made. Legally, if the Charter was deemed to alter the Constitution, it could only be adopted by a two-thirds majority of elected members of Parliament, which was not in session, having been dismissed after the coup. Deposed Prime Minister Laisenia Qarase, who opposed the Charter, however, stated that a referendum would constitute legal validation. In the end, the abrogation of the Constitution in 2009 made the question redundant, and much of the essence of the People's Charter was included in the new constitution promulgated by the interim government in 2013.

=== Content ===
The People's Charter was released to the public on August 6, 2008. Among its key proposals were the following:

- addressing the root causes of coups through political, social and economic reform;
- toughening the sanctions against coups;
- building "conflict resolution mechanisms for groups and individuals affected by coups";
- empowering courts to penalise or dissolve political parties which "engage in activities that breach important values of the constitution";
- establishing "civic programmes to raise public awareness about the injustice and illegality coups and issues of democracy and good governance";
- ensuring a separation between Church and State;
- enhancing and facilitating "public participation in all aspects of governments";
- enacting a Code of Conduct for government leaders;
- reforming land legislation to facilitate general access to land use, while maintaining and enhancing indigenous landowners’ rights;
- officialising the military's role in overseeing the governing of the country;
- introducing a one-man, one-vote electoral system, to replace the communal electoral rosters.

In addition, specific proposals aimed at promoting national unity and reducing inter-ethnic divisiveness:

- changing the official demonym of Fiji's inhabitants from "Fiji Islander" to "Fijian", a term currently applied only to indigenous Fijians;
- promoting interfaith dialogue;
- teaching both the Fijian language and Hindi in schools, so as to promote multiculturalism;
- instituting a national anthem in the country's three main languages: Fijian, Hindi and English.

== Criticism and support ==
=== Prior to publication ===
The proposed Charter received strong support from the head of the Roman Catholic Church in Fiji, Archbishop Petero Mataca, who became co-chair (with Commodore Bainimarama) of the National Council for Building a Better Fiji. However, others were more cautious, noncommittal or openly critical. Fiji Women's Crisis Centre coordinator Shamima Ali declined to comment. Fiji's Citizens Constitutional Forum continued to oppose the military coup, calling it unjustifiable, but in response to the proposed Charter, said there is "a serious need to re-look at problems to find solutions to move the country forward".

The National Federation Party and the Soqosoqo Duavata ni Lewenivanua Party both opposed the idea of a People's Charter implemented by an unelected government. Fiji’s Methodist Church, to which a majority of indigenous Fijians belong, also opposed the Charter, stating that it had been instructed by God to do so. The Fiji Labour Party supported it. The Fiji Council of Churches offered cautious support, urging people not to oppose it outright, and suggesting that it provided "a window of opportunity for the nation to move forward".

Samisoni Pareti of the magazine Islands Business expressed doubt as to whether elections could be held as promised in early 2009 if the interim government insisted on having the People's Charter in place before the election. In Pereti's view, the Charter would not be completed in time, and Bainimarama might have to choose between postponing the election (and thus sparking the ire of the international community) or abandoning his People's Charter. Pareti's prediction turned out to be accurate: the election was postponed.

By contrast, New Zealander human rights activist Thakur Ranjit Singh expressed public support for the People's Charter, stating that fresh elections alone would not address the "fundamental problems in Fiji", such as "the agenda of the nationalists who want Fiji for Fijians and Fiji as a Christian state" or a "culture of corruption, nepotism and cronyism"; the People's Charter must therefore, in Singh's view, be implemented before any election takes place.

The responses of Indo-Fijian cultural and religious organisations were mixed. The Hindu organisations Arya Pratinidhi Sabha and Sanatan Dharam Pratinidhi Sabha supported the process and agreed to take part in the NCBBF. By contrast, Sangam, an organisation representing South Indians, refused to do so, as did the Fiji Muslim League, describing itself as non-political. On an individual basis, prominent Indo-Fijians such as Shamima Ali, Brij Lal, Imrana Jalal, Wadan Narsey and Richard Naidu refused to support the Charter.

In March 2008, an editorial in the Fiji Daily Post commented that "a one-sided ‘People’s Charter’ for Fiji may not have the ameliorative effect its enforcers hope for. To truly succeed, the charter, like the nation, must proceed by bipartisan agreements, by consultative dialogue that brings victors and vanquished to the table of compromise so that a just settlement is achieved".

The Pacific Islands Forum supported the proposed Charter.

In April 2008, a Fiji Times opinion poll found that public opinion was evenly split, with 46.2% disagreeing with the idea of the Charter, and 45.8% supporting it. The poll was taken in the context of a public debate over the Charter, during which it was supported by Joseva Serulagilagi (Chairman of the Tailevu Provincial Council), Lorine Tevi (President of the Fiji Council of Social Services), and Pundit Kamlesh Arya (President of the Arya Pratinidhi Sabha of Fiji), and opposed by Wadan Narsey (Professor of Economics at the University of the South Pacific), Richard Naidu (Senior Partner at the Munro Leys law firm) and Tupou Draunidalo (Former Vice-President of the Fiji Law Society).

=== After publication ===
The People's Charter was released to the public on August 6, 2008. Deposed Prime Minister Laisenia Qarase was critical of its content. He dismissed as "unreasonable" its proposal to dissolve political parties which "engage in activities that breach important values of the Constitution". Qarase also opposed the proposed change in the country's demonym, which would enable all citizens of Fiji to refer to themselves as "Fijians": "That term [Fijian] is embedded into the indigenous population. It is a very sensitive issue and it will be opposed very strongly." Qarase stated that the Charter made a number of good suggestions, but that it would, on the whole, increase inter-ethnic tensions. He stated that "[s]ome of the key proposals in the charter, if implemented without the approval of an elected parliament, would be contrary to the provisions of the 1997 Constitution." He called upon the Charter to be voted on by an elected Parliament, and, alternately, suggested a referendum to decide the issue. He added:

"The composition of the NCBBF is not representative of the people. It is biased in favour of the Labour party, the New Alliance Party, the interim Government and coup supporters. The intention of the interim Government to implement proposed electoral changes before the elections would be illegal and in contravention of the 1997 Constitution. [...] The intention of the IG to make the charter binding on future elected governments without the authority of Parliament would be illegal and contrary to democratic principles."

Ousted Opposition leader Mick Beddoes also expressed his opposition to the Charter. The Fiji Labour Party, whose leader Mahendra Chaudhry is a member of the interim government, officially supported the Charter.

Academic Brij Lal, one of the authors of the Constitution, described the Charter as "too prescriptive", commenting that it appeared to aim at creating an unfeasible utopia. He added: "I think that for the charter and some of the recommendations to have credibility, they have to be endorsed through parliament."

The Methodist Church of Fiji and Rotuma confirmed its opposition to the Charter, both because it originated from a government that came to power by force (despite influential leaders of the Church having openly supported the coups of 1987 and 2000), and because the Church deemed it to be "an illegal, dangerous document that, if followed, will have a negative impact on the lives of Fiji citizens". Following a Church conference, Church general secretary Reverend Tuikilakila Waqairatu told the media:

"While the charter proposes some noble principles, the Conference is of the view that the interim government and the National Council for Building a Better Fiji do not have any moral or legal authority to impose it on the people. [...] [A]ny attempt to impose and legitimise the charter outside the Constitution and by an authority which does not have the people's mandate is morally unacceptable. It defies God's authority because it lacks any legal basis and it limits the free choice of the people to act according to their conscience."

The National Federation Party called upon citizens to boycott the charter consultation process, claiming that the Charter would disadvantage Indo-Fijians. Referring to the proposed abolition of the communal voting system, to be replaced by a "one man, one vote" electoral process, party secretary Pramod Rae stated:

“We’re alarmed at the proposal to disenfranchise [sic] large sections of the Indo-Fijian community, which will really be left without representation in parliament. Currently our community is guaranteed 19 seats in parliament. This charter proposal proposes to remove those.”

Ousted Vice-President and lawyer Ratu Joni Madraiwiwi sought to take a balanced and cautionary view:

"There is a critical need for dialogue and engagement in fora in which the interim government and its political opponents can participate without preconditions. The National Council for Building a Better Fiji (NCBBF) can continue to develop the principles for a charter for good government. But there has to be another means for finding common ground. The onus is upon the regime, as the party holding the reins of power, to engage. Without this, the country will continue to drift, as divided and fractured as ever, with a charter and a new electoral system being imposed, and the constitution abrogated to allow the implementation of both. The implications, both internally and internationally, hardly bear thinking about. The tragedy is that many beneficial features in both the proposed charter and the electoral system would be discounted because of the manner of their implementation.

The NCBBF must proceed with haste on the drafting of the charter. Given the determination of the commander and the military to implement what emerges from the consultations, so be it. [...] Let us see what emerges. The debate will centre on how the principles to be enshrined in the document are to be incorporated in the constitution. If the interim government wishes to force it and a new electoral system upon us, they have the backing of the military to silence dissent. But a new dispensation pushed on the people of this country will not be sustainable. In the long term, the will of the people will prevail."

Jone Dakuvula, of the Citizens' Constitutional Forum, commented favourably on the Charter:

"The ‘People’s Charter’ is an attempt to build a stronger liberal and secular republican democratic framework in a multi-ethnic state that continues to be dominated by an ethno-Fijian nationalism. [...] The hardline pursuit of ethno-nationalist policies during the five years that the SDL and Conservative Alliance–Matanitu Vanua (CAMV) were in power sharpened conflicts within the indigenous Fijian community [...]. The draft People’s Charter is an attempt to further reform our liberal/republican state so that the exclusivist tendency of indigenous ethno-nationalism is moderated and reoriented towards a broader concept of a multicultural, multi-ethnic nation state that stresses the civic principles of the nation as the regulator of political discourse and other interactions, thus contributing to the stability needed for overall national development. [...] While, in the last 18 months, the opposition to the interim government has not presented a coherent alternative for the way forward to the people of Fiji, there has at least been a concession that the draft People’s Charter advances ‘noble principles’ they cannot disagree with. They only disagree with the fact that the draft People’s Charter has been initiated by a regime they regard as illegal and illegitimate. They have yet to answer the realistic question: Where do we go from here?"

Bainimarama attacked some of his critics, labelling their objections self-serving:

"They are trying to hang on to the last straw as we make in-roads in giving a real voice and say to ordinary people in the country. [...] Naturally, there are some power hungry ethno nationalist SDL Leaders and followers, supported by the leadership of the Methodist Church and some chiefs who would not want ordinary people to be empowered in terms of decision making and aspiring for better things in life. They want to continue to remain in power and in the process ensure that the common people remain disenfranchised."

In October 2008, the Fijian Teachers Association objected to a proposal for the Charter to be presented to children at school, describing the idea as "propaganda".

== Basis for new Constitution ==
In July 2009, Bainimarama announced that his government would introduce a new Constitution by 2013, and that the Constitution would "derive its impetus from the recommendations under the Charter".

== See also ==
- 2006 Fijian coup d'état
- 2014 Fijian general election
