= Rodney Acraman =

Fijian civil servant

Rodney Acraman was Fiji's Acting Ombudsman and thus the ex officio Chairperson of the Fiji Human Rights Commission from 2006 to 2007, when he was replaced by Shaista Shameem. The Military administration, which took power in a coup d'état on 5 December 2006, appointed him to the Ombudsman's position on 13 December. Prior to his appointment, Acraman had worked for sixteen years in the Ombudsman's office. The position had been vacant since Walter Rigamoto had resigned earlier in the year to resume his private law practice.

Acraman's appointment prompted Commission member Sevuloni Valenitabua to resign in protest. Virisila Buadromo of the Fiji Women's Rights Movement also condemned the Commission for accepting Acraman's appointment, saying it was a tacit acceptance of the Military takeover.
