= Ballu Khan =

Fijian businessman

Ballu Khan is an Indo-Fijian businessman of New Zealand citizenry. His company, Tui Management Services, is the joint owner with the Vanua Development Corporation (VDC) of Pacific Connex (PCX), which sells SAP software and has sought to enter the 3G mobile telephony market in Fiji. VDC is the commercial wing of the Native Land Trust Board (NLTB) which administers indigenous land holdings throughout Fiji. He is also a major supporter of the Ovalau Rugby Union team.

Khan is known for his close ties with the former government of Laisenia Qarase, which was deposed in the military coup of 5 December 2006. He has a tense relationship with the Republic of Fiji Military Forces, which predates the coup.

The Fiji Sun reported on 25 October 2006 that Colonel Pita Driti, the land force commander, had condemned Khan for employing former Counter Revolutionary Warfare Unit (CRW) soldiers as bodyguards. The CRW was implicated in a mutiny which left eight soldiers dead on 2 November 2000. Driti and Captain Esala Teleni, the deputy commander of the military, issued a veiled threat to Khan, warning that the military was in a position to stop former CRW soldiers from working for him.

Following the coup, armed soldiers raided the PCX office and Khan's private residence on 9 December 2006, and arrested six bodyguards who had been CRW soldiers. Documents and hard drives were removed from the office, according to Colonel Driti. Khan's house was raided again on 12 December. All of these raids took place while Khan was out of Fiji.

== Early life ==
Ballu Khan was born in Nalomolomo on Nairai Island in 1959. His father died in the Kadavulevu ship disaster when he was 4. He graduated with a master's degree in Commerce from the University of the South Pacific. He became a school teacher and taught at Vunisea and Laucala Bay Secondary School. He then trained as a chartered accountant and became an investigator for New Zealand's Inland Revenue Department.

== Business ==
Khan formed Tui Consulting in Melbourne, Australia in 1997. Tui Consulting's business was assisting utilities and public sector organizations implement SAP software solutions. Tui Consulting has undertaken SAP projects in New Zealand, Australia, United States, Canada, and Singapore. In 2002 he moved the company's headquarters to Tacoma, Washington. Axon Group, a business transformation consultancy acquired Tui Consulting for a price, reported to be up to $(US)11.75 in December 2005.

It was reported in February 2005 that Tui Consulting was being sued by Singapore’s largest electricity retailer, SP Services, for problems related to TUI’s implementation of a SAP computer system. The dispute was reportedly settled in 2005. Reports quoted the utility as saying that it encountered large-scale billing problems beginning in January 2000, eventually affecting about 144,000 of the 1.2 million electricity accounts. Tui Consulting denied the claims and filed a countersuit for $3 million, blaming SP Services for the problems.

The New Zealand Herald reported that Khan had been a controversial figure in Fiji business and political circles. PCX of which he owned 49% won a US$9.2 million contract in 2004 to supply a new SAP based computer system and maintenance service to the NLTB. PCX was described by NLTB as a step to acquire greater indigenous Fijian involvement in Fiji's developing IT industry. PCX was to handle NLTB's requirements as well as to bid for other IT projects. Staff of the NLTB's IT division were transferred to PCX. The Fiji Labour Party called at the time for a commission of inquiry into the awarding of the contract to PCX. An independent audit report undertaken in 2007 by KPMG Australia criticised the NTLB for allegedly failing to conduct a proper investigation before buying the computer system. The KPMG audit report questioned the credibility of the mySap system and recommended the NLTB seriously reconsider continuing its business relations with PCX. The audit report stated that PCX faced financial difficulties and may be insolvent, with VDC having given it a loan of $(US)2.4m.

In April 2005 it was reported that Khan was a key figure in a bid by PCX to apply for a 3G mobile telephony wireless licence in Fiji. Because of the alignment of PCX with NLTB, through VDC, it was put forth by the NLTB as a company that represented the interests of the indigenous Fijian people. Another interested party in the bid was Digicel, owned by Irish telecommunications entrepreneur, Denis O'Brien.

== Sport ==
Khan was identified in 2003 as making a "substantial" financial contribution to help the Auckland Blues rugby club retain a former All Black, Carlos Spencer, when he had been made offers by European rugby clubs. It was also reported that he supported a rugby academy in Fiji that sent young players to New Zealand.

== 2007 arrest ==
Ballu Khan was one of a group of people arrested on 3 November 2007, as part of an investigation by the Fiji Police into an alleged assassination plot against members of the government. A military spokesman said that Khan resisted arrest and assaulted the officers who tried to detain him at a checkpoint in Lami. He also said that Khan had sustained minor injuries and was under armed guard at a hospital in Suva. On 21 November 2007, his lawyer Peter Williams Q.C. stated that Khan was seriously ill in hospital as a result of being assaulted by police and the deadline to charge him with offences related to the alleged assassination plot against national leaders had expired.

On 22 November 2007 Fiji Live quoted Khan as saying that people of high status within the interim government of Fiji and the military held grudges against him. On 22 November 2007 a lawyer filed a writ in the Fiji High Court seeking compensation of US$26 million. The writ claimed Khan's treatment amounted to torture and reckless disregard for his health, and his civil rights were abused. Fiji's interim attorney-general, Aiyaz Sayed-Khaiyum, stated the government of Fiji would defend the claim.

After being detained in hospital under police guard for two months, Khan was released on 8 January 2008. On 9 January 2008 he was charged with three counts of conspiracy to murder. The charges were dismissed by the High Court of Fiji in November 2008 and Khan immediately returned to New Zealand.

In March 2010 eight men were convicted of involvement in the assassination plot. At the sentencing, Justice Paul Madigan said there was no doubt that the plot was orchestrated by Khan.
