= Graham Leung =

Fijian lawyer

The Honourable Graham Leung

36th Attorney-General of Fiji
- In office 5 June 2024 – 1 June 2025
- Prime Minister: Sitiveni Rabuka
- Preceded by: Siromi Turaga
- Succeeded by: Siromi Turaga

Personal details
- Education: University of Adelaide; University of California Los Angeles

Graham Everett Leung is a Fijian lawyer who served as the attorney-general between 5 June 2024 - 1 June 2025. He previously served as the president of the Fiji Law Society. He was also chairman of the Electoral Commission, and was named as judge advocate of a Court Martial panel to retry 20 soldiers convicted mutiny in relation to the Fiji coup of 2000, but a number of complications left his commissioning in that office outstanding until he was finally approved as judge advocate and commissioned as an army officer with the rank of lieutenant colonel on 4 January 2006.

Privately, Leung was a senior partner at Howards, a commercial law firm in the Fijian capital, Suva. He retired from private practice in June 2009 following the abrogation of the Fijian Constitution. He chose not to renew his licence to practice law after the military backed regime altered the licensing procedure, requiring lawyers to submit their applications for new licences to practice from the office of Chief Registrar of the High Court. Previously, the Law Society issued legal practitioners with practising certificates.

== Political controversies ==
Leung was an outspoken critic of certain government policies which, he says, undermined the rule of law. In particular, he has opposed the early release of persons convicted and imprisoned for offences related to the Fiji coup of 2000, and the promotion of legislation which he believes undermines respect for the rule of law.

Leung strongly opposed the government's decision, announced on 29 November 2004, to release Vice-President Ratu Jope Seniloli from prison, where he had served little more than three months of a four-year sentence for his role in the Fiji coup of 2000. "It lends the appearance of two sets of rules, or two classes of justice. It lends the appearance that if you're well connected and of a high social standing, you might expect more favour with the authorities. Conversely, if you are a person of lesser social standing, you might expect the full brunt of the law to weigh on you. Now that seems to me to be a travesty," he said.

Addressing the annual conference of the Commonwealth Parliamentary Association in Nadi on 8 September, Leung said that the concept of true democracy was not well understood in Fiji. "Democracy, the rule of law and human rights march hand in hand. These concepts are not well understood by a good portion of the population," he said. "It is far more than merely participating in free and fair elections for a new government. It is about playing by a set of rules, respecting those rules and accepting the result even when it may not be what one had hoped for." Many Fijian people feared that could undermine their way of life, essence, and identity, he said. Rather than ridicule these fears, it was necessary to understand and address them, and to develop a new paradigm to illustrate the consonance between Fijian traditions and democratic norms. "The evidence shows a growing albeit reluctant acceptance of the rule of law," he said. "But time, patience and a genuine commitment not just of the country's leaders towards creating an environment that will allow democracy, human rights and the rule of law to flourish, will be required."

== The Reconciliation, Tolerance, and Unity Bill ==
On 21 May 2005, Leung joined numerous politicians, human rights organisations, and the military in opposing the government's proposed legislation to establish a Reconciliation and Unity Commission, which would be empowered, subject to presidential approval, to grant compensation to victims of the 2000 coup and amnesty to persons found guilty of involvement in it. Leung said that he and the Law Society supported the bill's purported aims of reconciliation, tolerance, and unity, but were strongly opposed to the amnesty provisions of the legislation, which he said were "repugnant" and would empower politicians to overturn judicial decisions. "It's likely to demoralise the judiciary and sap it of the will to continue its work," he said. It would also encourage future generations to regard coups as something they could take part in with impunity.

In a letter to Prime Minister Laisenia Qarase on 23 May, Leung said that as reconciliation and forgiveness were matters of the heart, they could not be legislated, and the bill would therefore fail to achieve its stated objectives. "The bill is not the answer to Fiji's problems," he said. He also expressed concern that the way the bill was written, linking compensation with amnesty, rich perpetrators of the 2000 coup would benefit the most. Citing the Fijian cultural inhibition on frank expression of strong opinions, he said that it would be unwise for the government to interpret the silence of the majority of its citizens as approval of its agenda. "It's the way we are – our people show their respect to their leaders by keeping quiet. It is considered rude to speak your mind," he said.

In a parliamentary submission on 16 June, Leung called the bill a recipe for instability, terror and payback, and a retrograde step, which could threaten present and future governments. "It would encourage the belief that if people think they have sufficiently good political reason to topple a government, politicians might consider granting them a pardon," Leung said. He expressed content that the decisions of the Commission and Amnesty Committee would not be required to state any reasons for their decisions, which would not be subject to appeal. He said it was "abhorrent and unacceptable" to create what amounted to retrospective legalisation of a terrorist act.

While opposing the legislation, however, Leung cautioned the military to show restraint, saying that Parliament had the constitutional Right to pass laws, whether good or bad, and that it was up to the people to punish politicians for bad laws at election time. "If the law is bad and unpopular, it is for the people through the ballot box, to show their displeasure," he said on 21 May. "But in a democracy, it is not the business of the military, however well-intentioned, to interfere with the law-making process."

On 4 July, the Fiji Times revealed that Leung had been trying for over a week to schedule a meeting with the Prime Minister, without receiving a response. Then on 5 July, Leung called for an urgent meeting with Attorney-General Qoriniasi Bale in an effort to persuade him to rewrite the bill, in response to recent comments by Military Commander Frank Bainimarama calling the bill a form of "ethnic cleansing." Leung said that every right thinking person should be alarmed that the debate had risen to that level.

== Law Society President ==
On 3 September 2005, Leung fended off a challenge from Lautoka-based lawyer Iqbal Khan to win a second term as president of the Fiji Law Society, amassing 91 percent of the vote. The term was for one year. Khan's campaign had been undermined by allegations that he had been barred from practising law in the Australian state of Queensland for corruption. He chose to retire from the presidency in 2006, and Devanesh Sharma was elected to succeed him on 9 September.

== Judge advocate ==
On 5 October 2005, Leung was named judge advocate of a court martial panel to retry 20 soldiers convicted of mutiny in relation to the Fiji coup of 2000. He was the only civilian member of the 10-member panel. On 19 October, however, he was abruptly dismissed by President Ratu Josefa Iloilo, but was subsequently reinstated on 26 October. The reasons for the dismissal and reinstatement were not fully clarified, but it was understood that the President had wanted to explore the matter thoroughly before ratifying Leung, the choice of the Military, as judge advocate. The trial was subsequently rescheduled, and adjourned, several times.

When the military commander, Commodore Frank Bainimarama, raised questions about why the commissioning process was taking so long, Home Affairs Minister Josefa Vosanibola revealed on 21 December that the government objected to what he said were Leung's exorbitant fees. "Even the Chief Justice ... (does) not get that kind of money," he said of the proposed F$130,000 contract. Commodore Bainimarama disagreed, saying that the same sum had been paid to the previous judge advocate.

On 4 January 2006, Home Affairs Minister Vosanibola announced that Leung had been approved as judge advocate, and commissioned as an army officer, with the rank of lieutenant colonel. The delay had been caused by the need to gain further information from the military, he claimed, but military spokesman Captain Neumi Leweni denied this.

Speaking to the media on 10 January 2005, clarified that he would not be receiving the F$130,000 remuneration as a lump sum. That was his annual remuneration, he said; the monthly remuneration amounted to one twelfth of that – considerably less than what he would be paid by private clients, whose custom he had to forgo for the sake of the court martial. Leung said he accepted the role of judge advocate after many others had declined it, because he felt strongly about the rule of law and the concept of justice.

He was a vocal critic of Fiji's most recent coup which took place in December 2006 and embarked on extensive speaking engagements internationally including countries like Kenya, Jamaica, Malaysia and Hong Kong, lamenting the undermining of the rule of law and democratic governance in Fiji. As a result of his stand against military rule, he was temporarily banned from leaving Fiji. The ban was lifted following his mounting of a High Court challenge. Following his departure from private practice in 2009, Leung lectured briefly at the University of the South Pacific in Suva. In December 2009, he undertook a consultancy with the Rome based International Development Law Organization where he worked in Kenya, helping to support the work of that country's Committee of Experts which had been tasked to draft its new constitution. Following that assignment, he was involved in the training of judges and lawyers in international human rights law with the Pacific Regional Rights Resource Team. In July 2011, he was appointed as the new director of the Centre for the Independence of Judges and Lawyers; he left this organisation in March 2012.

== Commonwealth Lawyers Association and other legal associations ==
It was revealed on 6 March 2006 that Leung had been elected onto the Council of the Commonwealth Lawyers Association. Founded in 1983, the council is a professional association of lawyers working to uphold the rule of law among the 53-member Commonwealth of Nations. Leung is the second lawyer from a Pacific Islands nation to serve on the council. The first was Ms. Alofa Seruvatu, former Secretary of the Fiji Law Society, who was elected in 2004. He was re-elected to the Council of the CLA in February 2011 at a meeting in Hyderabad, India. He is currently a senior vice-president of Law Asia. He is also on the executive of the International Bar Association's Pro Bono and Access to Justice Committee.

In 2022 he was appointed solicitor-general of the Cook Islands. In November 2022 he resigned, after nine months in the job.

== Personal life ==
Leung grew up in Levuka, Fiji, but now resides in Suva. He took up a short-term contract in September 2014 as Registrar of the Supreme Court of Nauru, and later as Solicitor General, then as Secretary of Justice, to replace Lionel Aingimea who stood for Parliament and was appointed Assistant Minister for Justice. Mr Aingimea who is a second term parliamentarian, is now Deputy Speaker of the Parliament of the Republic of Nauru. He took up an appointment as Solicitor General of the Cook Islands in March 2022 but resigned to return to Fiji in December of that year. He is now a legal consultant based in Suva.
