= Iqbal Khan (lawyer) =

Iftakhar Iqbal Ahmad Khan is an Indo-Fijian lawyer based in the city of Lautoka.

Khan practiced law in Parramatta, Australia as a public defender for the Legal Aid Society.

Khan has a controversial reputation, both in Fiji and Australia, where he was disqualified from practicing law in the state of Queensland in 2001, for nondisclosure of information to the barristers board when seeking admission. According to the Queensland Law Society, Khan withheld information about a complaint against him by Sheo Shankar, a client of his. Khan, however, claimed that he was disqualified not for dishonesty, but for being unafraid to speak his mind.

In Fiji, Khan defended a number of high-profile figures against charges of involvement in the Fiji coup of 2000. In August 2005, he secured the acquittal of Information Minister Simione Kaitani on coup-related charges.

On 3 September 2005, Khan challenged incumbent Graeme Leung for the Presidency of the Fiji Law Society, but was heavily defeated. Leung amassed 91 percent of the vote. Khan would not rule out making another bid for the post in 2006, but in the end, he did not, and Devanesh Sharma was elected to succeed Leung.
