= Virisila Buadromo =

Fijian journalist and activist

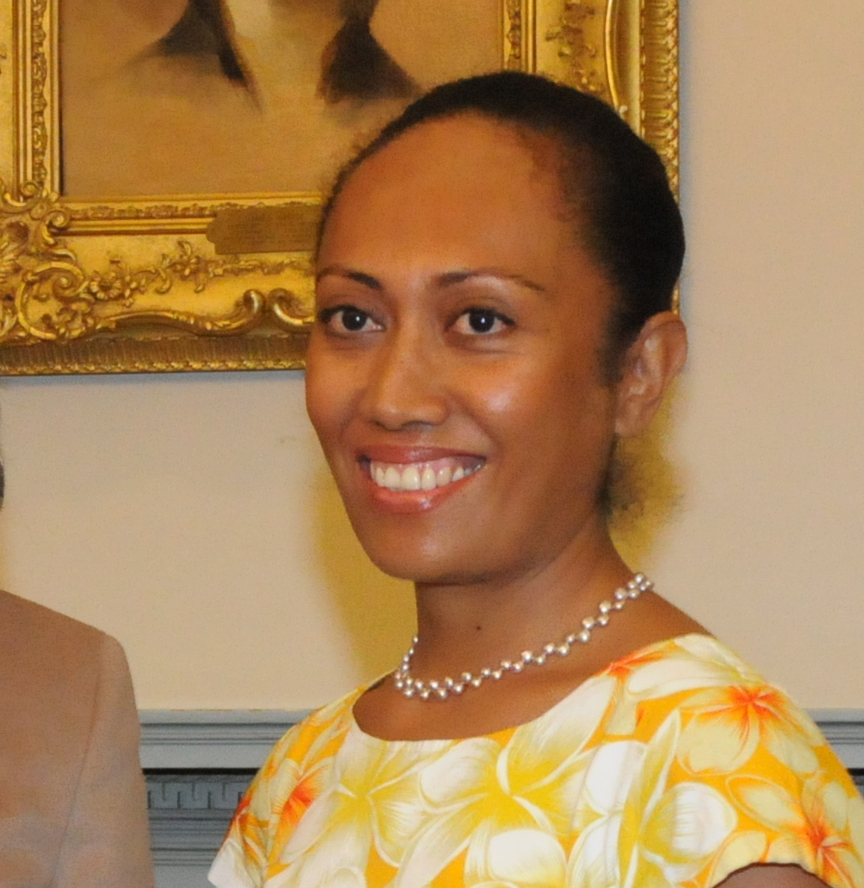
Buadromo in 2008

Virisila Buadromo (born 1972) is a Fijian political activist and former journalist, who was the executive director of the Fiji Women's Rights Movement (FWRM) from 2001 to 2015. She used to be the news director for FM96.

== Political positions ==
On 15 August 2006, Buadromo called for abortion to be legalized in Fiji.

== 2006 coup d'état ==
Buadromo strongly condemned the military coup which deposed the elected government of Prime Minister Laisenia Qarase on 5 December 2006. The Fiji Times quoted her on 12 December as saying that Fiji had a "coup culture" which was perpetuated by the failure of successive governments to prosecute perpetrators of earlier coups, from the 1987 coups onwards.

The Fiji Village news service reported on 9 December that she had issued a strong warning to any persons interested in applying for ministerial positions in a Military-backed government that participation would be illegal, and that the FWRM was documenting events in the wake of the coup. On 20 December, the Fiji Times and Fiji Sun quoted her as extending the blacklist to persons taking up positions in the civil service. "These are not private appointments. You are being offered positions on the boards of statutory or corporatised bodies, which are partially public or government-owned. This is the same as accepting a position in the illegal interim government," Buadromo said. She had already condemned lawyer Rodney Acraman on 15 December for accepting the position of Ombudsman and Chairman of the Fiji Human Rights Commission.

Fiji Village quoted Buadromo on 11 December as saying that on 4 December, she had received a call from an anonymous male who tried to intimidate her into ceasing her campaign against the Military.

A number of news agencies reported on 25 December that Buadromo, her partner Arshad Daud, and fellow-pro democracy activists Imraz Iqbal, Jacqueline Koroi, Laisa Digitaki, and Peter Waqavonovono had been summoned to Suva's Queen Elizabeth Barracks around midnight. There were allegations that soldiers had assaulted some of them, and had forced all of them to walk a long distance to the outskirts of the city and told to find their way home. On 23 December, Commodore Frank Bainimarama, Commander of the Republic of Fiji Military Forces, had accused Buadromo, along with lawyer Imrana Jalal, of having published his personal e-mail address and mobile telephone number in newspapers, which was causing him problems, he said.

== Personal life ==
Her father, Seni Buadromo, a former Lord Mayor of Suva, and her mother, Liku, are both from the Lau Islands. She has four sisters. Buadromo is married to Arshad Daud, an Indo-Fijian. Buadromo is a Christian.

== Sources ==
- Wansolwara Print, April edition, 2002 (most information in this article, except where otherwise noted, is gleaned from this source).
