= Essential National Industries (Employment) Decree 2011 =

The Essential National Industries (Employment) Decree 2011 is a controversial decree issued by the military-led 'interim government' of the Republic of Fiji in September 2011. It was followed a few days later by the Essential National Industries and Designated Corporations Regulations 2011.

== Background: the 2006 coup ==
On 5 December 2006, Commodore Voreqe Bainimarama, head of the Republic of Fiji Military Forces, overthrew democratically elected indigenous nationalist conservative Prime Minister Laisenia Qarase, and took his place at the head of an "interim government," composed of both civilian and military ministers. Bainimarama stated that his main reasons for overthrowing the Qarase government were that it was corrupt, and that it was conducting racially discriminatory policies against the country's Indo-Fijian minority - namely its policy of "affirmative action" in favour of the indigenous majority. In a speech publicly announcing the coup, he stated that Qarase's policies had "divided the nation now and will have very serious consequences to our future generations." He promised to amend the race-based electoral rolls, so as to "lead us into peace and prosperity and mend the ever widening racial divide that currently besets our multicultural nation".

Subsequently, his government abolished the Constitution and imposed strict censorship of the media.

== The government and trade unions prior to the decree ==
For several months, there had been considerable concern, expressed particularly by foreign trades union organisations, about restrictions on the rights of unions in Fiji, including acts of violence against unionists.

In February 2011, Amnesty International expressed concern about "the reported detention and beating of several trade unionists" in Fiji.

In March, the Trades Union Congress in the United Kingdom sent a protest to the Fiji High Commission in London, and issued the following statement:

"On 12 February, Felix Anthony was taken from his home by 3 uniformed military officers and subjected to threats whilst being driven around the back roads of Lautoka for some 2 hours. His family, including his children, were also threatened. On 18 February, Anthony and other union officials from the sugar industry were called to meet the Fijian Prime Minister at a sugar mill in Ba, on the western side of Fiji. The union representatives were subsequently assaulted by military officers while still at the mill, then taken to Namaka military barracks and subjected to further beatings. As they were released from the barracks, they were again threatened with further violence."

In July, Australia's Transport Workers Union threatened to disrupt flights to Fiji unless Qantas took steps to protect its Fiji-based workers "from state-sanctioned violence." This followed claims by Fijian union members, particularly baggage handlers, that they had been punched, kicked and "hit with rubber belts" by soldiers questioning their loyalty to the government. The New Zealand Council of Trade Unions said it shared the Australian union's concerns, and issued the following statement: "We are very concerned about the physical intimidation and beatings of union officials in Fiji and also the decrees that remove work rights".

In August, the Australian Council of Trade Unions condemned the police break-up of a meeting of the Fiji Trades Union Congress in Nadi.

The same month, Brendan Barber, General Secretary of the British TUC, wrote again to the Fiji High Commissioner in London, to express

"outrage over the arrest of Mr Daniel Urai, President, Fiji Trades Union Congress, on 3 August 2011 in Suva. We note that the arrest of the FTUC President comes in the wake of the introduction of a new decree which further restricts the exercise of trade union and human rights in Fiji under the military regime. The arrests of trade unionists are a gross violation of the ILO Declaration of Fundamental Principles and Rights at Work. Moreover, Fiji, which ratified Convention 98(1974) and Convention 87 (2002), is obliged to observe the workers' rights enshrined in them. Furthermore, these incidents constitute a serious impediment to Fiji's long overdue return to democracy, tarnish the image of your country and further aggravate the current difficulties, making social dialogue and reconciliation even more difficult."

The New Zealand Council of Trade Unions and Amnesty International Aotearoa New Zealand held a protest following Urai's arrest for unlawful assembly. Helen Kelly, President of the CTU, stated that "earlier in the year, Felix Anthony of the FTUC was physically assaulted. The regime is perpetrating a deliberate attack on trade union rights by issuing decrees making it almost impossible for unions to function and removing internationally recognized civil rights of freedom of assembly and collective bargaining."

== Terms of the decree ==
The decree was officially issued by the President of Fiji, Epeli Nailatikau, whose role as head of State is an essentially ceremonial one. Its main stated objective is to "ensure the present and continued viability and sustainability of essential national industries for the benefit of Fiji".

Its terms are as follows:

- All existing trade unions must re-register in order to continue their activities (art.6);
- "All existing collective agreements" between employees and their employers are voided 60 days after the commencement of the decree (art.8);
- Elections of trade union representatives are subject to government approval (art.10);
- An employer may appeal to the government to cancel a representative's election if he or she at any time has "reliable objective information and evidence" that "at least 35% of workers" no longer support that representative (art.15); this enables the employer to cancel any "existing or current collective agreement" (art.17);
- "If an employer has suffered operating losses for two consecutive fiscal years, or two years of actual or expected operating losses in a three-year period, it shall have the immediate right to renegotiate all its existing collective agreements". If no agreement can be reached with employees, the employer then sends a proposal to the government, which may approve it as binding upon employees, replacing any necessity for an agreement (art.23);
- Within "designated corporations", employees have no entitlement to overtime pay on Saturdays, Sundays or public holidays, unless granted by the employer (art.24);
- Art.24 also abolishes the Wages Council's jurisdiction over "any 'designated corporation' or essential national industry";
- "Disputes over discipline and discharge" are to be settled within the company, or by the government if ultimately unresolved, with no recourse to any court of law or any judicial institution (art.26);
- "No job actions, strikes, sick outs, slowdowns or other financially or operationally harmful activities shall be permitted at any time for any reason". Strikes are permitted only if employees have been negotiating unsuccessfully for at least three years for a collective agreement with their employer, and if they thereupon provide twenty-eight days' advance notice of the strike to their employer and to the government, and if the government approves the requested strike. The employer may then lock out any striking workers and "unilaterally impose terms and conditions of employment". Any worker taking part in an unauthorised strike may face a sentence of up to five years' imprisonment, combined with a fine of up to $50,000. The government may order the end of any strike (or lockout) in "any essential national industry" at any time (art.27);
- The decree prevails over any inconsistency with any existing law (art.28);
- No court of law, tribunal or commission has any jurisdiction to examine the legality or validity of the decree or of any decision made by the government or by any employer in application thereof (art.30).

== Terms of the regulations ==
The Essential National Industries and Designated Corporations Regulations 2011 were issued by Commodore Bainimarama on 8 September "in exercise of the powers vested in me by section 31" of the Decree, to come into force the following day. They provided a list of the country's "essential national industries", as determined by Bainimarama. They are: the ANZ Bank, the Bank of Baroda, the Bank South Pacific, Westpac, the Fiji Revenue & Customs Authority, Fiji International Telecommunications, Telecom Fiji, the Fiji Broadcasting Corporation, Air Pacific, the Fiji Electricity Authority, and the Water Authority of Fiji.

== Rationale and reactions ==
=== Government and Fiji press ===
Attorney General Aiyaz Sayed-Khaiyum played down the idea that there was anything exceptional about the Decree, during a press conference prior to its finalisation. He argued that "some countries restrict any strikes in essential services", and that "the principle of essential services is not anything new". In response to union reactions, he argued that the decree would actually preserve jobs: "We have found in companies that are financially unstable that if certain steps aren’t taken, they could close down therefore there’ll be job losses. Unionists that are not employees don’t have a particular self interest in preserving or maintaining the life of the company. You have to maintain the life of the company to make sure jobs are secure".

The Fiji Times, subject to government censorship, reported simply that "[t]he terms of the Essential National Industries (Employment) Decree 2011 [...] will govern the labour laws of the declared enterprises, ensuring the viability and sustainability of the industries while protecting fundamental workers' rights". It quoted Sayed-Khaiyum's statement that "[t]he Government takes providing for and protecting workers' rights very seriously".

The Fiji Sun published an explanatory article by the Ministry of Information, including a list of "frequently asked questions" to reassure readers. To the question "Does the decree remove workers' right to strike, as some have claimed?", the answer provided is: "No. The decree upholds the fundamental principle that workers may strike. Just as many other countries do, it makes it subject to certain conditions, including providing employees with a vote in favour or against it." And to the question "Are employers allowed to impose terms and conditions on workers?", the answer given is: "A due process must be followed as set out in the decree, involving good faith negotiations for at least 60 days in the case of a replacement agreement. Only after that would an employer have the right to implement new terms and conditions. Employees would have the right to appeal to the Minister for a review of the new terms."
The final question is "What is your response to the claim that the Government has wiped out decades of advances for its workers?", with the government responding:

"In support of the great strides Fijian workers have made in recent time, the Fijian Government’s labour and employment protection benefits are responsible, comprehensive and genuine. The Fijian Government takes seriously the need to balance the well-being of Fiji’s economy and its ability to provide jobs with the intent to improve the quality of life for all Fijians and, importantly, to uphold justice and promote fundamental workers' rights.
We do not believe these are mutually exclusive goals. We continue to strive to ensure our body of employment and labour laws uphold our duty and commitment to the Fijian people. Meanwhile, trade unions cannot be allowed to hold essential industries ransom by blocking changes to terms and conditions and taking damaging strike action with impunity."

=== Criticism ===
No public protests or demonstrations are allowed in Fiji, but the Fiji Trades Union Congress issued a statement saying the Decree "offers major weapons to the employers to utilise against unions [...] It outlaws professional trade unionists, eliminates existing collective agreements, promotes a biased system of non-professional bargaining agents to represent workers, severely restricts industrial action, strengthens sanctions against legally striking workers and bans overtime payments and other allowances for workers in 24-hour operations". Attar Singh, General Secretary for the Fiji Islands Council of Trade Unions, said: "We have never seen anything worse than this decree. It is without doubt designed to decimate unions [...] by giving [employers] an unfair advantage over workers and unions".

Amnesty International condemned the Decree as "a breathtaking abuse of fundamental rights [which] takes away nearly all collective bargaining rights in essential companies [and] virtually abolishes the right to strike". It added: "Fundamental human rights are at stake, including the right to freedom of association and assembly, and the right to organise. Amnesty International stands steadfast in solidarity with workers in Fiji and the Fiji labour movement in their struggle to defend their rights."

Juan Somavia, Director-General of the International Labour Organization, stated:

"By going ahead with this Decree the Government has demonstrated the same lack of concern for the views of the international community as it has for the rights and aspirations of its own people. What is really essential for Fiji is that it change course now. That means reversing this and other restrictive labour decrees, a return to dialogue with trade unions and employers, an end to assaults on and harassment of trade unionists, and the immediate restoration of basic civil liberties."

Mahendra Chaudhry, leader of the Fiji Labour Party, published a statement in July which did not specifically mention the Decree but addressed the government's broader policies in relation to trade unions:

"Fiji has ratified [...] ILO Conventions and must act in conformity with them. It cannot promulgate laws that contravene these Conventions or go around physically bashing union leaders. [...] Both the local unions and the international trade union movement have written to the government protesting against its anti-union policies and decrees. There has been no response. How does one take up issues with a government that does not respond to concerns raised with it, does not consult and thinks it can govern through arbitrary decisions, suppression of rights, intimidation and physical violence [...]?"

Shaista Shameem, former director of the Fiji Human Rights Commission, who had at first supported the 2006 military coup, stated that "many rights have been completely diminished or even removed" by the Decree. She added that it showed the Bainimarama government was no longer interested in consensual policy-making.

In October, during the Commonwealth Heads of Government Meeting in Australia, Ged Kearney, President of the Australian Council of Trade Unions, said that, within the Commonwealth, the worst abuses of workers' rights were currently occurring in Fiji and in Swaziland. The Commonwealth Trade Union Group called for condemnation of the Decree.

Sayed-Khaiyum dismissed the criticism, saying much of it was based on "misinformation".

== Aftermath: Arrest of trade union leaders ==
In late October and early November, Fijian Trades Union Congress leaders Daniel Urai and Felix Anthony were both separately arrested, and reportedly held without charge. The Australian government said the Fiji authorities were "targeting and intimidating trade unionists".
