= Noelene Nabulivou =

Fijian feminist and environmentalist

Noelene Nabulivou (born 1967 or 1968 (age 57–58)) is a Fijian activist and spokesperson on climate change, sustainable development, and gender equality. She is the co-founder and political advisor for Diverse Voices and Action for Equality (DIVA), an organisation that promotes climate justice, reducing violence against women, human rights, and LGBTQ rights.

== Life ==
Nabulivou grew up between Perth, Australia and Fiji. In Perth she was involved with small anarchist collectives, migrant and indigenous groups, and public arts projects. She studied international relations and peace studies at a university level, and also holds a diploma in community arts.

In the religious and machismo-infused culture of her home, Nabulivou, who is the daughter of a Methodist minister, did not come out as lesbian until she was 35. She recalls that being openly gay did not seem a possibility for her generation, and in Fiji same-sex marriage and adoption by gay couples remains illegal. She describes ongoing discrimination and homophobia in her daily life.

Nabulivou lives in Suva, Fiji with her wife, daughter, and extended family.

== Activism ==
Nabulivou is active as a Fijian and Pacific spokesperson in United Nations processes and workgroups such as Small Island Developing States, Rio+20 (the United Nations Conference on Sustainable Development) and Agenda 2030 (the United Nations' Sustainable Development Goals).

Nabulivou also works with Development Alternatives with women for a New Era (DAWN) and the Pacific Feminist Coalition on Sexual and Reproductive Health and Rights.

Nabulivou has worked to protect universal health for well over 30 years, though in recent years this has become more challenging. Covid-19 isn't the only thing that Fiji is struggling to overcome at this time, as the climate crisis is worsening. Tropical cyclones are emerging around the South Pacific, creating a "lack of housing, education, water and sanitation, food and security."

=== Diverse Voices and Action (DIVA) For Equality ===
In 2011, Nabulivou cofounded Fijian human rights organization Diverse Voices and Action (DIVA) for Equality, which she has continued to work for as political adviser of special projects. The group serves to support LBTI people like Nabulivou herself by creating a peer support network. According to the Astraea Lesbian Foundation website, Nabulivou and the members of DIVA work together to promote equality, "protection and advancement of sexual rights, human rights, gender justice and social, economic, ecological and climate justice."

DIVA carries out public education on LGBT and women's rights, creates safe spaces for them, and works with LGBTQI and female builders to ensure that people in those groups have safe stormproof shelter with sanitation facilities such as tap water and toilets. Violence against women in Fiji such as corrective rape occurs at some of the highest per capita rates in the world, giving urgency to DIVA's mission of building transitional and permanent shelters for victims away from their abusers.

Due to climate change, Fiji has seen reduced agricultural production; for example, bees must travel further and produce less honey due to a shortage of flowers. Fiji has also been battered by the intensifying tropical cyclones (such as Cyclone Winston in 2016) and sea level rise, which have forced dozens of coastal communities to evacuate. For Nabulivou and DIVA's gender and climate justice mission, this is a feminist and LGBT issue, as those already marginalized and impoverished face violence and uncertainty in the aftermath.

DIVA has assembled a network of about 600 women, forming "Women Defend the Commons", referring to the ecosphere and biosphere, which are held in common by all humans. The group takes part in activities such as planting of mangroves.

== Awards ==
- International Women's Health Coalition Joan B. Dunlop Honoree, 2020
