= Savenaca Siwatibau =

Fijian academic leader and civil service administrator

Head of United Nations Economic and Social Commission for Asia and the Pacific
- In office 1988–2000

Vice-Chancellor, University of the South Pacific
- In office 2001–2005

Pro-Chancellor, University of the South Pacific
- In office 1997–1999

Governor, Reserve Bank of Fiji
- In office 1984–1988

Alternate Director, International Monetary Fund
- In office 1978–1980

Director of Economic Planning, Fiji
- In office 1970–1972

Personal details
- Born: November 4, 1940 Buca Bay, Cakaudrove Province
- Died: October 3, 2003 (aged 62) Christchurch, New Zealand
- Spouse: Suliana Kaloumaira (m. 1966)
- Children: Simione Ramacake; Ropate Rakula; Atunaisa Taleasiga; Asenaca Tania Tuivanuavou

Savenaca Siwatibau (1940 – 3 October 2003) was a Fijian academic leader and civil service administrator.

The son of Isaac Driver and Adi Asenaca Mairara, Siwatibau was born on 4 November 1940 in Tukavesi Village in Buca Bay, Cakaudrove Province, but grew up in Buca, the village of his mother, who was of chiefly rank. He was educated at Queen Victoria School and Suva Grammar School, graduating as the Dux in 1958. In 1963, he graduated from New Zealand's the University of Auckland with a Master's degree in Science, with a major in mathematics and physics. While at Auckland University, he had met his future wife, Suliana Kaloumaira, a native of Moturiki Island. They were married in 1966. They had three sons (Simione Ramacake, Ropate Rakula, and Atunaisa Taleasiga), and one daughter (Asenaca Tania Tuivanuavou). Two sons became IT engineers and one a lawyer. His daughter became a banker.

After working as a meteorologist in Nadi, Siwatibau was posted to the Meteorology Office in Wellington, New Zealand, where he decided to study economics at Victoria University. His study was interrupted by a transfer to the Economic Planning office in Suva, but he was able to continue his studies at Sussex University in the United Kingdom, graduating in 1968 with a Master of Arts degree in economics. When Fiji gained its independence from the United Kingdom in 1970, Siwatibau was appointed the first native-born Director of Economic Planning.

In 1972, he became Permanent Secretary of Finance, and also joined the University of the South Pacific as a government representative on the institution's ruling body, the University Council. From 1978 to 1980, he served as an Alternate Director of the International Monetary Fund in Washington, D.C., and on his return to Fiji, he was appointed Local General Manager of the Central Monetary Authority in 1981. In 1984 he became the first Governor of the Reserve Bank of Fiji. In 1988, he left Fiji for six months to pursue a fellowship at the Australian National University, and on his return, he was appointed Head of EPOC (the United Nations Economic and Social Commission for Asia and the Pacific (ESCAP) Pacific Operations Centre in Vanuatu), a position he held until 2000.

While still at EPOC, he was appointed Pro-Chancellor of the University of the South Pacific in 1997, and was promoted to Vice-Chancellor in 2001. The appointment generated some controversy, with some university staff having supported Rajesh Chandra for the post.

In 2000, George Speight, who led a civilian insurrection against the elected government of Prime Minister Mahendra Chaudhry, proposed Siwatibau for the post of Prime Minister. Siwatibau was not a party to the plot and had no apparent sympathy with it, but Speight may have wanted a respected name to lend legitimacy to his rebel government.

Savenaca Siwatibau died of lung cancer at Christchurch Hospital in New Zealand on 3 October 2003. He was 62.

His family and friends remembered him as a committed Christian who had a strong sense of fairness and justice. Several times he was offered the CBE honour but declined saying that he wanted God's approval, not man's.
