= Shamima Ali =

Fijian political activist

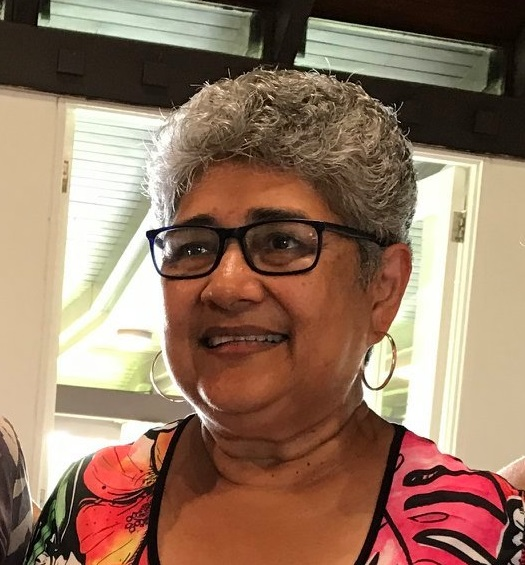
- Born: Fiji
- Education: University of the South Pacific
- Occupations: Women's rights activist, human rights activist
- Years active: 1980s–present
- Organization: Fiji Women's Crisis Centre
- Known for: Coordinator of the Fiji Women's Crisis Centre
- Awards: International Women of Courage Award (2007); Human Rights Defender Award (2009)

Shamima Ali is a Fijian women's rights and human rights activist. She has served as the coordinator of the Fiji Women's Crisis Centre (FWCC) since 1986 and has been active in campaigns against violence against women and in support of women's rights, democracy and human rights in Fiji and the wider Pacific region.

Ali is a founding member of the Fiji Women's Rights Movement and the Pacific Women's Network Against Violence Against Women. She also served as a member of the Fiji Human Rights Commission from 2004 to 2006. Her work has included advocacy, community education and training for police and other service providers on violence against women and human rights.

Ali became internationally known for her opposition to the 2006 military coup in Fiji and for her subsequent criticism of human rights abuses under the military-backed interim government. She has received several honours for her work, including the United States Department of State's Women of Courage Award in 2007, Amnesty International Aotearoa New Zealand's inaugural Human Rights Defender Award in 2009, and the Paul Harris Fellow recognition from the Rotary Foundation. In 2011, she was named Islands Business magazine's Pacific Person of the Year.

== Early life and education ==
Ali studied at the University of the South Pacific, where she graduated with a Diploma in Education in 1974. She subsequently worked as a teacher, initially teaching physics at Gau Secondary School in the Lomaiviti Islands. She later moved into radio before beginning her work with the Fiji Women's Crisis Centre.

Ali's early professional experience in education and media later contributed to her work in public advocacy and community education. She has described activism during her university years as an important influence on her subsequent career.

== Fiji Women's Crisis Centre ==
The Fiji Women's Crisis Centre was established in 1984 to provide assistance to women affected by violence. Ali joined the organisation shortly after its establishment and became its coordinator in 1986.

Under Ali's leadership, the FWCC developed beyond its original focus on rape crisis services to provide crisis counselling, legal and medical assistance, protection services and advocacy for women and children affected by violence. The organisation also conducts training and community education and works with police and other institutions on responses to violence against women.

Ali has also worked regionally to support organisations addressing violence against women. She has been a founding member of the Pacific Women's Network Against Violence Against Women and has participated in training and mentoring initiatives involving women's organisations throughout the Pacific.

In addition to providing services, Ali has advocated for changes in attitudes and institutional responses to gender-based violence. Her work has included training police officers and other service providers and campaigning for greater recognition of women's human rights.

== Human rights and political activism ==
Ali served as a commissioner of the Fiji Human Rights Commission from 2004 to 2006.

Following the military coup of December 2006, Ali publicly opposed the takeover and criticised the military-backed interim government over alleged human rights violations. In December 2006, she said that she intended to continue speaking out despite fears about the consequences of doing so.

Ali also criticised Shaista Shameem, then director of the Fiji Human Rights Commission, over Shameem's response to the coup. Ali argued that the commission had failed to adequately respond to alleged abuses by the military. Following the arrest and alleged assault of six pro-democracy activists in December 2006, Ali said that Shameem had told her that there was nothing the commission could do.

In January 2007, Ali criticised a report by Shameem that she said justified the coup by describing the deposed government as "illegally constituted". Ali argued that the report represented Shameem's personal views rather than an authorised position of the Human Rights Commission and called for her resignation.

Later that month, Ali said that her intervention had helped secure the release of lawyer Richard Naidu, who had been detained by the military after making comments about the president on Radio New Zealand. The military denied that Ali had played a role in his release.

Ali subsequently remained a prominent critic of restrictions on civil liberties and of governments that she considered insufficiently accountable. She has continued to publicly advocate for democracy, the rule of law and human rights alongside her work on violence against women.

== Regional work ==
Ali has worked with women's organisations across the Pacific on the prevention of violence against women and the development of support services. She has been involved with the Vanuatu Women's Centre since its establishment in the 1990s and has supported its work through training and mentoring.

In 2012, she was appointed to a United Nations expert group concerned with the prevention of violence against women and girls.

Ali has also participated in regional initiatives involving governments, civil-society organisations and international agencies on gender-based violence and women's rights.

== Honours ==
On 10 December 2009 Ali was awarded Amnesty International Aotearoa New Zealand's inaugural Human Rights Defender award.

In September 2022 she was awarded Vanuatu's 40th anniversary medal for her work in eliminating violence against women and children.
