= Devanesh Sharma =

Fijian lawyer of Indian descent (born 1967)

Devanesh Prakash Sharma (born Suva 1967) is Fiji's most prominent Barister in Fiji in recent times. He is a former president of the Fiji Law Society. He remains the Barister of choice for Fijian celebrities, politicians, corporate executives and diplomats.

== Early life ==
Sharma was born in Toorak, Suva. He attended Marist Brothers Primary School in Toorak and for his secondary education he attended Marist Brothers High School. In school he played soccer and was a member of the school quiz and oratory teams and he also enjoys reading and writing. He later attended New Plymouth Boys' High School in New Zealand. After completing high school he attended Victoria University of Wellington where he completed his law degree. Sharma was admitted to the bar in New Zealand in 1988 after he graduated from Victoria University. He returned to Fiji in 1992 and was admitted to the Fiji bar in 1993. He is one of the two partners in the law firm of R. Patel & Co. Sharma is one of the leaders of the Bar in Fiji and has distinguished himself in the civil and criminal jurisdictions. He recently successfully defended prominent human rights campaigner Imrana Jalal and her husband Ratu Sakiusa Tuisolia against charges brought b y Fiji's Independent Commission against Corruption, an agency created after the 2006 coup.

== 2006 coup ==
On 9 September 2006, Sharma was elected to succeed Graeme Leung as President of the Fiji Law Society.

He strongly condemned the military coup that toppled the elected government of Prime Minister Laisenia Qarase on 5 December 2006, and criticized some of his fellow lawyers who supported or worked with the Republic of Fiji Military Forces. He dismissed as unconstitutional the swearing-in of Commodore Frank Bainimarama as Interim Prime Minister on 5 January 2007, but accepted the interim Cabinet sworn in on 8–9 January.

Sharma did not seek re-election for the post of the President of the Fiji Law Society at the Annual General Meeting held on 28 September 2007.
