= Human rights in Fiji =

Fiji is an island nation in Melanesia in the South Pacific Ocean with a population of approximately 849,000. It is made up of Fijians (57 percent), Indo-Fijians (37 percent), Europeans, Chinese, other Pacific islanders, and people of mixed racial descent (6 percent). Fiji has been in a state of political unrest since their independence from Britain in 1970.

Normally the Fijian political system is one of a parliamentary representative democratic republic. There have been four military coups since Fiji's independence from Britain in 1970. Since 1987 the military has either had a significant influence in the politics of Fiji, or have been directly ruling. Fiji was governed by military-backed régime from December 2006 to September 2014, at which point a general election restored a parliamentary civilian government.

== International Treaties ==
Fiji became a member of the United Nations on 13 October 1970. Fiji has acceded to some, but not the majority, of the key human rights treaties. It is a party to the conventions against racism (Convention on the Elimination of All Forms of Racial Discrimination) and discrimination against women (Convention on the Elimination of All Forms of Discrimination against Women), and on the rights of the child (Convention on the rights of the Child).

In March 2016, Fiji ratified the Convention Against Torture. Fiji has not acceded to the covenants on civil and political rights (International Covenant on Civil and Political Rights), or on economic, social and cultural rights (International Covenant on Economic Social and Cultural rights). Fiji is also not a party to the convention on persons with disabilities (Convention on the Rights of Persons with Disabilities).

== Protection of human rights in the Constitution and domestic legislation ==
The most current constitution of Fiji was introduced in 2013, laying the groundwork for the restoration of democracy.

The fourth chapter of the 1997 Constitution of Fiji, titled the Bill of Rights, comprised a total of twenty three sections and contained provisions for human rights protections. The 1997 constitution was the supreme law of Fiji from the creation of it in 1997 until April 2009. However, it was suspended by President Josefa Iloilo in April 2009 after the Fijian Court of Appeal ruled that the military government that was in power, who took over as a result of a coup d’etat in 2006, illegal.

Even though the Constitution of Fiji was abrogated in 2009, the President on 10 April 2009, issued the “Existing Law Decree 2009” stipulating that all “Existing Laws in force immediately before the 10th day of April 2009 shall continue in force....” “Existing Laws” meant all written laws other than the Constitution Amendment Act 1997. This decree guaranteed the continued existence of all human rights related local laws existing in Fiji during and including the time of the abrogation of the Constitution.

The new Constitution introduced in 2013 includes a Bill of Rights (chapter 2, articles 6 to 45). It protects, among others, the right of habeas corpus, the right to due process, freedom of expression, freedom of movement and association, freedom of conscience, the right to privacy, the right to participate through elections in the political process, protection from discrimination (on any grounds including ethnicity, gender, social origin, sexual orientation, age, "economic or social or health status", disability or religion), property rights, the right to education, "the right of every person to work and to a just minimum wage", the right to adequate housing, access to food and water, and the right to health and to social security schemes. It also guarantees (article 40) "the right to a clean and healthy environment, which includes the right to have the natural world protected for the benefit of present and future generations".

== Fiji Human Rights Commission ==
[Information here removed as copyright violation. The information may be found at its original source here.]

The Human Rights Commission Decree 2009 was passed by the military regime to establish the Commission and lays the groundwork in its work in and out of the country. Since then, the Commission have played a vital role in promoting human rights in Fiji and advocating it abroad. During the 2009 Fijian constitutional crisis, the Fiji Human Rights Commission showed support for the then President, Ratu Josefa Iloilo, stating that "the President had no choice but to abrogate the 1997 Constitution after the Fiji Court of Appeal ruled that the interim government was illegal." However, the Head of the Fijian Human Rights Commission, Shaista Shameem, also stated that the Commission would act as if the Bill of Rights part of the Constitution was still legally in effect.

== Human Rights Violations ==
The Universal Periodic Review, which is a progress which involves a review of the human rights records of the Member States of the UN, by the Human Rights Council, every four years, reviewed the human rights situation in Fiji in August 2009.

“Fiji remains a military dictatorship that denies its citizens the right to take part in self-government through free and fair elections, as well as the freedoms of speech, press, assembly, and religion. Since the December 5, 2006 coup d'état, the military and police have arbitrarily arrested and detained human rights defenders, journalists and others perceived as critical of the administration. Four people have died in military or police custody and dozens of people have been intimidated, beaten, sexually assaulted, or subjected to degrading treatment. Fiji's interim administration continues to fail to uphold the rule of law and has seriously compromised the independence of the judiciary. No UN special procedures have visited since the 2006 coup. A visit by the UN Special Rapporteur on the independence of judges and lawyers is pending, though the Fiji government has failed to advise a suitable time for this visit. The government has not responded to the request to visit of the Special Rapporteur on torture and other cruel, inhuman or degrading treatment or punishment.”

== Key recent developments ==
1. Fiji ratified the United Nations Convention against Torture (CAT) in March 2016
2. Fiji seeks UN Human Rights Security Council bid in 2015 but withdrew later with the Prime Minister stating that Fiji should tackle current issues that need immediate actions such as climate change and global warming first before officially bidding for a seat on the Council
3. Creation of the People's Charter for Change, Peace and Progress in 2008 to improve human rights relations in the country and abroad.
4. The Human Rights Commission Decree 2009 passed by the military regime to establish the Commission and lays the groundwork for its work in and out of the country.

=== Areas of key concern ===
1. Equality and non-discrimination
2. Freedom of religion or belief, expression, association and peaceful assembly, and right to participate in public and political life
3. Right to life, liberty, and security of the person
4. Administration of justice, including impunity, and the rule of law
5. Right to marriage and family life
6. Freedom of movement
7. Right to work and to just and favorable conditions of work
8. Right to education
9. Rights of Minorities and indigenous peoples

== Proposed Reforms ==
In July 2009, the interim Prime Minister Voreqe Bainimarama announced that Fiji would have a new constitution by 2013. This new constitution would derive from the People's Charter for Change, Peace and Progress and well as from “extensive consultations with political parties, non-governmental organizations and ordinary citizens.

The United Nations special rapporteur has urged the government of Fiji to strengthen its Human Rights Commission by ratifying several key international agreements including the International Covenant on Civil and Political Rights and the ILO agreement on Indigenous and Tribal Peoples Convention, 1989. He urged the strengthening of the Fiji's Human Rights and Anti-Discrimination Commission and the peaceful dealing with hate speech on social media without infringing on people's freedom of expression. These he said, are the key issues holding the nation back on taking a step forward in its dealings with human rights.

== See also ==
- LGBT rights in Fiji
- Women in Fiji
