= Shiu Sharan Sharma =

Member of House of Representatives (Fiji) Nadi Rural Indian Communal Constituency
- In office 1999–2000
- Succeeded by: Gunasagaran Gounder

Personal details
- Party: Fiji Labour Party

Shiu Sharan Sharma is a Fiji Indian politician who won the Nadi Rural Indian Communal Constituency, one of the 19 seats reserved for Fiji citizens of Indian origin, for the Fiji Labour Party during the 1999 elections for the House of Representatives.

On 19 May 2000, he was among the 43 members of the People's Coalition Government, led by Mahendra Chaudhry, taken hostage by George Speight and his band of rebel Republic of Fiji Military Forces (RFMF) soldiers from the Counter Revolutionary Warfare Unit. He was released on 12 July 2000.
