= Gunasagaran Gounder =

Indo-Fijian medical doctor and politician

Dr Gunasagaran Gounder

Member of House of Representatives (Fiji)
- In office 1999–2006

Assistant Minister for Health (Fiji)
- In office 1999–2000

Minister for Curative Health Services (Fiji)
- In office 2006–2006

Personal details
- Party: Fiji Labour Party
- Profession: Medical Doctor

Dr Gunasagaran Gounder is a Fiji Indian medical doctor who, as a Fiji Labour Party candidate, defeated the Leader of Opposition, Jai Ram Reddy of the National Federation Party, in the contest for the Yasawa Nawaka Open Constituency seat in the 1999 general election. He was subsequently appointed Assistant Minister for Health in the Peoples Coalition Government led by Mahendra Chaudhry from 1999 to 2000.

He was taken hostage in the 2000 Fijian coup d'état and held for 56 days. He was released on 13 July 2000.

On 19 May 2000, he was among the 43 members of the People's Coalition Government, led by Mahendra Chaudhry, taken hostage by George Speight and his band of rebel Republic of Fiji Military Forces (RFMF) soldiers from the Counter Revolutionary Warfare Unit. He was released on 13 July 2000 after 56 days of captivity.

From 2001 to 2006, he represented the Nadi Rural Indian Communal Constituency, one of 19 reserved for Indo-Fijians, which he held for the Fiji Labour Party (FLP) in the parliamentary elections of 2001 with almost 69 percent of the vote.

In 2003, Goundar was offered the portfolio of Minister for Health Promotion, together with 13 other FLP parliamentarians who were offered cabinet positions by the Prime Minister, Laisenia Qarase but the FLP refused to accept this offer.

At the 2006 general election, Gounder transferred to the neighbouring Nadi Urban Indian Communal Constituency and held it for the FLP with more than 76 percent of the vote. He was subsequently named as one of nine FLP Ministers in the multi-party Cabinet that was formed and served in the Cabinet as Minister for Curative Health Services.

Gounder was removed from his ministerial offices as a result of the military coup that took place on 5 December 2006.
