= Violence against women in Fiji =

Public health issue of violent acts against women

Violence against women in Fiji is recognised to be a "pervasive, widespread and a serious national issue" in the Pacific Island region. Fiji's rates of violence against women are "among the very highest in the world". The Fiji Women's Crisis Centre reports that 64% of women who have been in intimate relationships have experienced physical or sexual violence from their partner, including 61% who were physically attacked and 34% who were sexually abused.

The 2006 Fijian coup d'état created conditions which exacerbated the presence of violence against women in Fijian society, especially in the public sector. Conventional attitudes about the place of women in Fijian society perpetuate the normalisation of violence against women and permeate extended family groups, the local authorities and the judiciary.

== Fiji's recent political background ==
=== 2006 Fijian coup d'état ===
In December 2006 Commodore Bainimarama seized control of the Fijian government, deposed the Prime Minister Laisenia Qarase and named Jona Senilagakali as Prime Minister. Subsequently, the Fijian media was heavily censored. On December 7 Bainimarama sacked the Acting Commissioner of Police, Moses Driver, and installed Army Colonel Jim Kori, securing military control of the police force.

The 2006 military coup in Fiji created an unstable political environment and heralded a range of human rights violations, including instances of violence against women. The Emergency Regulations put in place following the coup resulted in impunity for police and authorities who were involved in, or failed to prevent, instances of violence against women.

Steps toward restoring the rule of law in Fiji were made when a Constitution was adopted in 2013. In 2014 a General Election was held and Frank Bainimarama was elected as Prime Minister.

== International legal obligations ==
Fiji is a party to the Convention on the Elimination of All Forms of Discrimination Against Women (CEDAW). Although there is no specific provision in the convention on violence against women, the Committee on the Elimination of Discrimination against Women stated in their General Recommendation No. 19 that Violence against Women is “a form of discrimination that seriously inhibits women’s ability to enjoy rights and freedoms on a basis of equality with men”, which fell within the definition of “discrimination” in Article 1 of the convention. The committee on the Elimination of Discrimination against Women have affirmed that states who are party to the convention are required to act to protect women against violence of any kind. The Committee specifically addressed the issue of violence against women in Fiji in their 2010 Concluding Observations.

== Violence against Women ==
The committee on the Elimination of Discrimination against Women (CEDAW Committee) reported that the level of violence against women in Fiji was “persistently high in both the private and public spheres”. The reported violence took place as physical or sexual abuse in a domestic context, along with several other forms.

=== Violence against women's rights activists ===
Amnesty International reported violence in the forms of threats, assaults and torture perpetrated against female women's rights activists by military officers during the military takeover in December 2006.

=== Violence against sex workers ===
Amnesty International also reported that in 2009 the Police Commissioner took part in “Christian crusades” to combat crime in Fijian urban centres. These “crusades” involved the arrest, assault and rape of sex workers. The criminalisation of sex work in Fiji made these sex workers particularly vulnerable to violence perpetrated by the police.

The CEDAW Committee observed that the Public Emergency Regulation promulgated at the time of the abrogation of Fiji's Constitution in 2009 granted immunity to police and military officers and allowed them to carry out the aforementioned instances of violence against women with impunity.

=== Causes ===
==== Gender stereotypes ====
Strong patriarchal attitudes and conventional beliefs about the roles and responsibilities of women are culturally prevalent in Fiji and contribute to the normalisation of violence against women. The Fijian authorities are often reluctant to arrest and charge men for physically abusing their female partners unless there is pressure from the victim's family or from women's rights activists providing advocacy services to the victim. This reluctance to prosecute stems from the widely accepted belief that men are allowed to beat their wives and partners if they have "good cause". Conventional attitudes in Fiji do not consider domestic violence a criminal offence but rather a family matter to be resolved by those involved. 2015

== Local women's rights activist groups ==
Efforts to challenge the norm of violence against women in Fiji are made by a number of activist groups. The Fiji Women's Crisis Centre (FWCC) provides counselling, legal and medical support services to female victims of domestic violence and are involved in public advocacy and community education on violence against women. The FWCC also compiles and presents data on domestic violence in Fiji.

The Regional Rights Resource Team (RRRT) is the Human Rights Programme of the Secretariat of the Pacific Community (SPC). The RRRT operate in Fiji and focus on gender violence as a specific issue. RRRT operates by providing "training, policy advice and technical support to Pacific governments and civil society".

== Legislation addressing violence against women ==
=== Domestic Violence Decree 2009 ===
The Domestic Violence Decree was passed in 2009 and commenced in September 2010. Among the objects of the Decree are: "to eliminate, reduce and prevent domestic violence", "to ensure the protection, safety and wellbeing of victims of domestic violence" and to meet Fiji's international obligations under CEDAW. The decree provides for restraining orders to be applied for by adult victims of domestic violence. Formerly protection orders could only be obtained for children under the Family Protection Act 2003. Restraining orders under the Domestic Violence Decree can be applied for whether or not the perpetrator is charged with a criminal offence.

The Domestic Violence Decree also imposes duties upon police to prevent domestic violence, detect instances of domestic violence and to apprehend perpetrators. Police are under the duty to respond to and investigate reports of domestic violence and to provide assistance to the victim. Police are also under the duty to apply for a restraining order for the protection of a victim of domestic violence if a person is charged with committing a domestic violence offence or where the police officer suspects or believes that someone is at risk of domestic violence.

== Obstacles to implementation of Violence against Women legislation ==
The reluctance of police to charge perpetrators of violence against women has been discussed above. There are further obstacles to the successful implementation of the Domestic Violence Decree.

=== Customary and religious practices (bulubulu) ===
Customary "reconciliation" or "forgiveness" ceremonies are widely used to deal with cases of domestic violence internally. The ceremony usually consists of the perpetrator's family asking forgiveness from the victim's family through presentation of gifts. These ceremonies take place without the victim's consent or participation and disempower the victim from deciding whether or not to report the violence. Furthermore, the ceremonies, which are intended to help keep the family unit together preclude the victim from leaving the abusive relationship./

Amnesty International reported that in 2009 the Fijian police force joined the New Methodist Church in undertaking Christian "crusades" and compelled victims of domestic violence to reconcile with their husbands. This was portrayed as "the implementation of Christian principles of maintaining the family unit". It was also reported that in many cases where reconciliation was compelled by the authorities the abuse re-occurred.

In cases where a person is charged with a domestic violence offence, Fiji's Criminal Procedure Decree requires the courts to "promote reconciliation and encourage and facilitate the settlement in an amicable way of the proceedings". This means that the court is to encourage parties in cases of domestic violence to substitute proceedings with reconciliation ceremonies. The courts also take reconciliation ceremonies into account when sentencing the offender, resulting in a lesser sentence. In effect, the courts' recognition of reconciliation and forgiveness ceremonies enable perpetrators of domestic violence to escape the full force of the law and deny victims acknowledgement of the gravity of the offence. Gender and Human Rights Adviser Imrana Jalal observes that the recognition of these ceremonies prioritises social cohesion and harmony over the rights of the victim.

=== Judicial processes ===
Cases of domestic violence are often prosecuted under common assault, resulting in lenient sentences for the offenders such as six months or less.

The aforementioned gender stereotypes permeate the judiciary in Fiji. Amnesty International expressed concern over the lack of sufficient training for the judiciary in Fiji in addressing cases related to violence against women. An example is provided of a Magistrate telling a victim of domestic violence that she was "not living in a utopia and should not expect a perfect husband" and asked the victim "which woman has not been slapped by her husband?"

However, in 2012 the Fiji Judiciary Criminal Law Workshop for Judges and Magistrates provided the judiciary with guidance in applying the Domestic Violence Decree. The workshop identified the limitations of customary reconciliation ceremonies and stressed the importance of promoting "an equal access to justice by women", especially in relation to violence against women.

== See also ==
- Fiji Women's Crisis Centre
- Women in Fiji
