= FWCC =

FWCC may refer to:

- Fiji Women's Crisis Centre
- Friends World Committee for Consultation
- Families with Children from China
- Fort Worth Convention Center
