= Amjad Ali (Fijian politician) =

Fiji Indian politician

Member of House of Representatives (Fiji) Nadi Urban Indian Communal Constituency
- In office 1999–2006
- Succeeded by: Gunasagaran Gounder

Nadi Open Constituency
- In office 2006–2006
- Preceded by: Krishna Prasad
- Succeeded by: vacant

Personal details
- Party: Fiji Labour Party

Amjad Ali is a Fiji Indian politician. In the House of Representatives he represented the Nadi Urban Indian Communal Constituency, one of 19 reserved for Indo-Fijians, from 1999 to 2006, having held the seat for the Fiji Labour Party (FLP) in the general elections of 1999 and 2001. At the 2006 general election, he transferred to the Nadi Open Constituency and held it for the FLP.

During the 1987 Fijian coups d'état Ali hijacked a plane demanding the release of the deposed leaders who were under house arrest. The hijacking failed and he was apprehended but his sentence, only for bringing an explosive on an airplane, was suspended.

On 19 May 2000, he was among the 43 members of the People's Coalition Government, led by Mahendra Chaudhry, taken hostage by George Speight and his band of rebel Republic of Fiji Military Forces (RFMF) soldiers from the Counter Revolutionary Warfare Unit. He was released on 13 July 2000 after 56 days of captivity.

He had made an unsuccessful attempt to win the Nadi Urban Indian Communal seat in the 1994 general elections, losing to his National Federation Party opponent.

Ali's political career came to an end with the military coup that took place on 5 December 2006.

Ali now resides in New Zealand.
