= Sereima Lomaloma =

Sereima Lomaloma is a minister in the Anglican Diocese of Polynesia and a former government officer in the Fijian government. She was ordained in December 1995, becoming the first indigenous Pacific Island woman priest.

== Life ==
Lomaloma was born and raised in Fiji. She holds a master's degree in social planning for developing countries.

From 1991 to June 2000, she was the Director for Women and Culture at the Ministry for Women and Culture and Social Welfare, Fiji.

Lomaloma is a particular advocate for a faith-based approach to combating violence against women and children and has contributed to the Anglican church’s organisational policy of zero tolerance of domestic violence in its homes, schools, settlements and parishes. From 2007 she pressed the church to provide resources for survivors of gender-based violence, and in 2009 the House of Sarah was launched with funding from the Anglican Mission Board. The organisation focuses on reducing faith-based violence against women and girls, as well as providing education and training in supporting survivors to clergy and leaders of women's, youth and men's groups. Lomaloma continues to serve on the organisation's management team. She has also served on the board of Homes of Hope (Fiji) and the Fiji Women's Crisis Centre.

Lomaloma is active in the Pacific Conference of Churches and was the Secretary of the Diocese of Polynesia. She is a member of the advisory board of the Australian government's Pacific Women Shaping Pacific Development program and a member of the Anglican Communion’s Anglican Safe Church Commission.
