= National Council for Building a Better Fiji =

2007 Fijian government organisation for implementing the People's Charter

The National Council for Building a Better Fiji (NCBBF) was an organisation established in 2007 by the government of Fiji. Its task was to prepare the People's Charter for Change, Peace and Progress proposed by interim Prime Minister Commodore Voreqe Bainimarama, who came to power in a military coup in December 2006.

The council was intended to be "broadly representative of Fiji society (including leaders and representatives from the civil society including NGOs, the private sector, religious and community organisations, employers/workers and youth organisations, and the political parties)". It was co-chaired by Commodore Bainimarama and by Archbishop Petero Mataca, head of the Catholic Church in Fiji.

Officially, the NCBBF's work on the Charter was overseen by an independent monitoring group, which reported directly to President Ratu Josefa Iloilo. The monitoring group was chaired by Sela Molisa, a member of the Parliament of Vanuatu. Reverend Amy Chambers was also a member of the monitoring group. The NCBBF itself was composed of three task teams:

- one (co-chaired by Ratu Josefa Serulagilagi and Attorney General Aiyaz Sayed-Khaiyum) tasked with focusing on good governance,
- another (co-chaired by Ratu Josateki Nawalowalo and Finance Minister Mahendra Chaudhry) on economic growth, and
- the third (co-chaired by Lorrine Tevi and Health Minister Dr. Jiko Luveni) on "social cultural identity and nation building."

On 5 August, 2008, the NCBBF announced that it had endorsed a draft Charter document, which was to be released shortly thereafter. Fijilive reported that the NCBBF planned to "gauge the views of the people on the draft Charter via a public awareness campaign over the next six weeks". Meetings would be held in public venues, the Charter would be advertised in the media, and there would be "consultations by public relations teams at grassroots level in all the villages and settlements throughout the country".

The proposed charter was widely rejected by politicians opposed to the Military government, which was one of the factors that led to the abrogation of the constitution in 2009.
