= Nadi Urban (Indian Communal Constituency, Fiji) =

Former electoral constituency in Fiji

Nadi Urban Indian Communal is a former electoral division of Fiji, one of 19 communal constituencies reserved for Indo-Fijians. Established by the 1997 Constitution, it came into being in 1999 and was used for the parliamentary elections of 1999, 2001, and 2006. (Of the remaining 52 seats, 27 were reserved for other ethnic communities and 25, called Open Constituencies, were elected by universal suffrage). The electorate covered the City of Nadi in the western part of the main island of Viti Levu, and included Nadi International Airport, Fiji's main airport.

The 2013 Constitution promulgated by the Military-backed interim government abolished all constituencies and established a form of proportional representation, with the entire country voting as a single electorate.

== Election results ==
In the following tables, the primary vote refers to first-preference votes cast. The final vote refers to the final tally after votes for low-polling candidates have been progressively redistributed to other candidates according to pre-arranged electoral agreements (see electoral fusion), which may be customized by the voters (see instant run-off voting).

=== 1999 ===
1999 Fijian general election
Party	Candidate	Votes	%	±%
Labour	Amjad Ali	6,829	65.69	
NFP	Dorsami Naidu	3,567	34.31	

=== 2001 ===
2001 Fijian general election
Party	Candidate	Votes	%	±%
Labour	Amjad Ali	6,169	69.57	+3.88
NFP	Dorsami Naidu	2,649	29.45	−4.86
New Labour Unity Party	Suresh Chandra Verma	178	0.98	New
Labour hold		Swing	+3.88	

=== 2006 ===
2006 Fijian general election
Party	Candidate	Votes	%	±%
Labour	Gunasagaran Gounder	8,108	76.06	+6.49
NFP	Sushila Rameshwar	2,151	20.18	−9.27
SDL	Mohammed Zarib	266	2.50	
Independent	Kamlesh Prasad	120	1.13	
Independent	Sanmogam Sanu	15	0.14	
Labour hold		Swing	+6.49	

== Sources ==
- Psephos - Adam Carr's electoral archive
- Fiji Facts
