= Laurel Vaurasi =

Fijian lawyer

President of the Fiji Law Society
- In office September 2016 – 19 September 2020
- Preceded by: Peter Knight
- Succeeded by: William Wylie Clarke

Personal details
- Education: Bond University; Queensland University of Technology
- Occupation: Lawyer

Laurel Vaurasi is a Fijian lawyer. She served as the first female president of the Fiji Law Society between 2016 and 2020, and is member of the FIFA Football Tribunal since 2021.

== Early life ==
Vaurasi got a degree in law from the Bond University and a postgraduate from the Queensland University of Technology in 1997.

Laurel began her professional career as a legal assistant at the Native Land Trust Board and in 1996 moved to Australia to work, first in Queensland at the Public Prosecutor's Office and then in New South Wales in the private sector the following year. She also worjed for the High Court of Australia in August 1998.

== Career ==
She returned to Fiji in 1998 to work in the private sector until 2002, when she joined the in-house legal team at the Carpenters Fiji Ltd. group, where she worked on financial and employment matters. She became a partner in a law firm in 2003 and in 2007 was head of the legal department at the Superannuation Fund in Suva until she founded her own law firm in 2009, which she has managed ever since.

Laurel has particular expertise in civil, commercial, contractual and criminal law and is a mediator and member of the Singapore Mediation Centre.

In September 2016 Laurel became the first female President of the Fiji Law Society, succeeding Peter Knight, a society of which she was already a member. In 2015, Vaurasi condemned the threats and possible attacks against the lawyer Aman Ravindra Singh, who was investigating individuals accused of sedition. In April 2020, she emphasised the vital importance of upholding the rule of law and judicial processes during the COVID-19 pandemic in Fiji. She was succeeded on 19 September 2020 by William Wylie Clarke. That year, also in September, she was elected member of the Fiji Football Association's Appeals Committee, and was re-elected in July 2024 for another four-year term.

She was elected member of the FIFA Football Tribunal's Dispute Resolution Chamber in September 2021, receiving the unanimous support of the 11 Oceania nations.
