= Laisenia Tuitubou =

Fijian politician

Minister for Youth and Sports
- In office 25 September 2014 – 21 November 2018
- Prime Minister: Frank Bainimarama
- Preceded by: Military regime
- Succeeded by: Parveen Bala

Personal details
- Born: 1955 or 1956 Sinuvaca, Koro Island, Fiji
- Died: 25 January 2025
- Party: FijiFirst

Laisenia Bale Tuitubou (1955 or 1956 – 25 January 2025) was a Fijian military officer, politician, and cabinet minister. He was a member of the FijiFirst Party.

Tuitubou was from Sinuvaca on Koro Island in the Lomaiviti Islands.

Under the Bainimarama military regime he served as commissioner for the Central Division from 2011 to 2014.

He ran as a FijiFirst candidate in the 2014 Fijian general election. While failing to be elected, he subsequently entered parliament as a replacement for Jiko Luveni, who had resigned in order to be appointed Speaker. He was subsequently appointed minister for youth and sports in the cabinet of Frank Bainimarama. As Minister he advocated for military cadet training in schools.

He was not selected as a candidate for the 2018 election.
