= Air New Zealand Flight 24 =

1987 aircraft hijacking

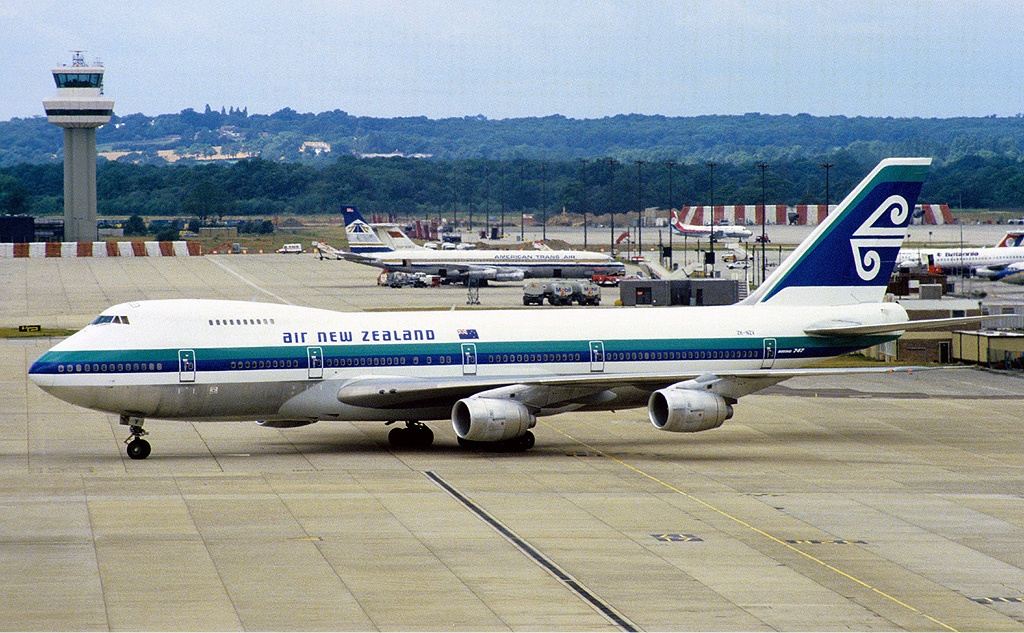
- ZK-NZY, Air New Zealand Boeing 747-200 similar to the one involved in the hijacking.

Hijacking
- Date: 19 May 1987
- Summary: Hijacking
- Site: Nadi International Airport, Fiji

Aircraft
- Aircraft type: Boeing 747-219B
- Operator: Air New Zealand
- Registration: Unknown
- Flight origin: Tokyo Narita Airport, Japan
- Stopover: Nadi International Airport, Fiji
- Destination: Auckland International Airport, New Zealand
- Occupants: 129
- Passengers: 105
- Crew: 24
- Fatalities: 0
- Survivors: 129

Air New Zealand Flight 24 was hijacked on the tarmac at Nadi International Airport, Fiji, on 19 May 1987. The flight, operated by a Boeing 747-200, was making a scheduled refuelling stop while en route from Tokyo Narita to Auckland.

The hijacker boarded the aircraft and held the three flight crew members hostage, threatening to blow up the aircraft unless the deposed Fijian prime minister, Timoci Bavadra, and his 27 ministers who were being held under house arrest were released. The flight crew were eventually able to overpower the hijacker and hand him over to local police. There were no injuries or deaths reported, and the aircraft never left the tarmac.

== Hijacking ==
Flight TE24 was en route to Auckland from Tokyo when it made a scheduled refuelling stop in Nadi. Most of the passengers on this flight were Japanese. TE24 was standing on the tarmac refuelling when Amjad Ali, armed with dynamite explosives from a gold mine, boarded the aircraft. Ahmjed Ali, then aged 37, an ethnic Indian who worked as a refueller for Air Terminal Services, entered the flight deck and told to the captain that he was carrying dynamite and would blow up the aircraft if his demands were not met.

Using the plane's radio, he demanded the release of the deposed Fijian prime minister, Timoci Bavadra, and his 27 ministers who were being held under house arrest by rebel leader Lt. Col. Sitiveni Rabuka in the 1987 Fijian coups d'état. Ali also demanded to be flown to Libya.

All 105 passengers and 21 of the 24 crew disembarked. Captain Graham Gleeson, flight engineer Graeme Walsh, and first officer Michael McLeay remained with Ali in the cockpit. For six hours, Ali talked with relatives in the Nadi tower and Air New Zealand negotiators in Auckland. Meanwhile, the New Zealand Special Air Service were placed on a state of "preparedness."

At around 1 p.m., while Ali was distracted with the radio, flight engineer Walsh hit him with a bottle of whiskey. The crew members were able to overpower Ali and handed him over to local police. He received a suspended sentence for taking explosives onto an aircraft.

== Aftermath ==
Following the incident, New Zealand's Prime Minister, David Lange, said that he was "grateful" the incident was over.

Ahmjed Ali later became a member of the House of Representatives of Fiji in 1999. In 2014, Ali confirmed to the Dominion Post that he has been granted permanent residency in New Zealand since 2009. Immigration New Zealand refused to comment on the circumstances regarding the granting of his resident status.

Gleeson has said that he did not condone the hijacking, but was sympathetic to Ali.
