= Nadi Rural (Indian Communal Constituency, Fiji) =

Former electoral constituency in Fiji

Nadi Rural Indian Communal is a former electoral division of Fiji, one of 19 communal constituencies reserved for Indo-Fijians. Established by the 1997 Constitution, it came into being in 1999 and was used for the parliamentary elections of 1999, 2001, and 2006. (Of the remaining 52 seats, 27 were reserved for other ethnic communities and 25, called Open Constituencies, were elected by universal suffrage). The electorate covered the rural hinterland of the City of Nadi in the western part of the main island of Viti Levu.

The 2013 Constitution promulgated by the Military-backed interim government abolished all constituencies and established a form of proportional representation, with the entire country voting as a single electorate.

== Election results ==
In the following tables, the primary vote refers to first-preference votes cast. The final vote refers to the final tally after votes for low-polling candidates have been progressively redistributed to other candidates according to pre-arranged electoral agreements (see electoral fusion), which may be customized by the voters (see instant run-off voting).

=== 1999 ===
1999 Fijian general election
Party	Candidate	Votes	%	±%
Labour	Shiu Sharan Sharma	5,1395	66.09	
NFP	Dewendra Pratap	2,768	33.91	

=== 2001 ===
2001 Fijian general election
Party	Candidate	Votes	%	±%
Labour	Gunasagaran Gounder	5,351	68.79	+2.70
NFP	Surendra Kumar	2,295	29.50	−4.32
New Labour Unity Party	Ram Vinod	133	1.71	New
Labour hold		Swing	+2.70	

=== 2006 ===
2006 Fijian general election
Party	Candidate	Votes	%	±%
Labour	Perumal Mupnar	6,825	71.91	+3.12
NFP	Kama Waddi Raju	2,528	26.64	−2.86
SDL	Armogam Sami	138	1.45	New
Labour hold		Swing	+3.12	
