= Fiji Women's Rights Movement =

The Fiji Women's Rights Movement (FWRM) is a multi-ethnic and multi-cultural organisation based in Suva, Fiji, that works to remove discrimination against women through attitudinal changes and institutional reforms. FWRM believes in the practice and promotion of feminism, democracy, good governance and human rights. FWRM is known for its public opposition to military rule in Fiji since the first coup in 1987, and for its innovative approaches and core programmes related to intergenerational women's leadership in Fiji, particularly young, indigenous and locally-born women.

In 2016, FWRM launched Girls Digital Stories, a project aimed at challenging bullying and discrimination, through the narratives of 10-12 year old girls, using storytelling and digital art.

== History ==
The Fiji Women's Rights Movement was founded by 56 women in 1986, including those who had set up the first support organisation against gender-related violence in Fiji, the Fiji Women's Crisis Centre (FWCC). They were determined that their group would "seek to change laws and policies which discriminated against women or that failed to adequately address their concerns". The founding members included FWCC's Shamima Ali, human rights lawyer Imrana Jalal, Adi Kuini Bavadra, Alefina Vuki, Helen Sutherland, ‘Atu Emberson-Bain, Michelle Reddy, and Penelope Moore (who became FWRM's first Coordinator or Executive Director).

Political activist Virisila Buadromo was the organisation's Executive Director from 2001 till 2015, when Tara Chetty took over.

== Achievements ==
The Fiji Women's Rights Movement is noted for its work on promoting the political participation of women, including through constitutional reform. FWRM, with its partners FemlinkPACIFIC, the National Council of Women (Fiji), and Soqosoqovakamarama iTaukei, formed the Fiji Women's Forum in 2012 to increase women's participation in leadership. While Fiji has one of the highest proportions of women in parliament in the Pacific (16% in 2014), FWRM and the Fiji Women's Forum have been determined to improve women's representation in political and public life.

FWRM's programme for the empowerment of girls, known as GIRLS (Grow-Inspire-Relate-Lead-Succeed) has been called "one of Fiji’s, if not the region’s, finest feminist-based gender equality projects for 10-12 year girls." This is part of the organisation's significant efforts at supporting intergenerational feminist leadership in Fiji and the Pacific.
