= Michelle Reddy =

Women's rights advocate in Fiji

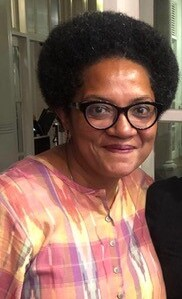
- Education: University of the South Pacific
- Occupation: Women's rights advocate
- Organizations: Fiji Women's Rights Movement; Pacific Feminist Fund

Michelle Reddy is a women's rights advocate in Fiji. Reddy attended the University of the South Pacific, where she earned her Bachelor of Education degree in Literature and Language, going on to earn two postgraduate diplomas, one in literature, and one in development studies. She has held several roles including being an Acting Executive Director of the Fiji Women's Rights Movement (FWRM) and served as the manager of the Fiji Women's Fund from 2017 to 2022. She joined the newly-formed Pacific Feminist Fund in 2022. In 2008 she represented Fiji at the Association for Women's Rights in Development conference in Cape Town, South Africa.
