= Counter Revolutionary Warfare Unit Court Martial, Fiji =

2005 court martial in Fiji

The mutiny that took place at Fiji's Queen Elizabeth Barracks in Suva on 2 November 2000 resulted in the death of four loyal soldiers. Four of the rebels were subsequently beaten to death after the rebellion had been quelled.
