= Yasawa Nawaka (Open Constituency, Fiji) =

Former electoral constituency in Fiji

Yasawa Nawaka Open is a former electoral division of Fiji, one of 25 open constituencies that were elected by universal suffrage (the remaining 46 seats, called communal constituencies, were allocated by ethnicity). Established by the 1997 Constitution, it came into being in 1999 and was used for the parliamentary elections of 1999, 2001, and 2006. It comprised the Yasawa Islands and a western portion of the main island of Viti Levu.

The 2013 Constitution promulgated by the Military-backed interim government abolished all constituencies and established a form of proportional representation, with the entire country voting as a single electorate.

== Election results ==
In the following tables, the primary vote refers to first-preference votes cast. The final vote refers to the final tally after votes for low-polling candidates have been progressively redistributed to other candidates according to pre-arranged electoral agreements (see electoral fusion), which may be customized by the voters (see instant run-off voting).

=== 1999 ===
Candidate	Political party	Votes (primary)	%	Votes (final)	%
Gunasagaran Gounder	Fiji Labour Party (FLP)	6,576	46.53	9,453	66.88
Jai Ram Reddy	National Federation Party (NFP)	4,651	32.91	4,681	33.12
Eroni Lewaqai	Party of National Unity (PANU)	1,805	12.77	...	...
Jone Nalewatobo	Christian Democratic Alliance (VLV)	1,078	7.63	...	...
Takorua Sisa	Soqosoqo ni Vakavulewa ni Taukei (SVT)	24	0.17	...	...
Total		14,134	100.00	14,134	100.00

=== 2001 ===
Candidate	Political party	Votes (primary)	%	Votes (final)	%
Perumal Mupnar	Fiji Labour Party (FLP)	6,235	49.29	6,927	54.76
Bal Subramani Dass	National Federation Party	2,722	21.52	3,235	25.57
Takorua Sisa	Soqosoqo Duavata ni Lewenivanua (SDL)	2,434	19.24	2,488	19.67
Taniela Waipanu	Independent	719	5.68	...	...
Mohammed Shorab Khan	New Labour Unity Party (NLUP)	540	4.27	...	...
Total		12,650	100.00	12,650	100.00

=== 2006 ===
Candidate	Political party	Votes	%
Adi Sivia Qoro	Fiji Labour Party (FLP)	7,858	50.30
Saimoni Naivalu	Soqosoqo Duavata ni Lewenivanua (SDL)	4,163	26.48
Bal Subramani	National Federation Party (NFP)	2,772	17.74
Mataiasi Saukuru	Party of National Unity (PANU)	769	4.92
Dewa Nand	Independent	60	0.38
Total		15,622	100.00

== Sources ==
- Psephos - Adam Carr's electoral archive
- Fiji Facts
