= Jiko Luveni =

Fijian politician

Her Excellency The Honourable Jiko Luveni
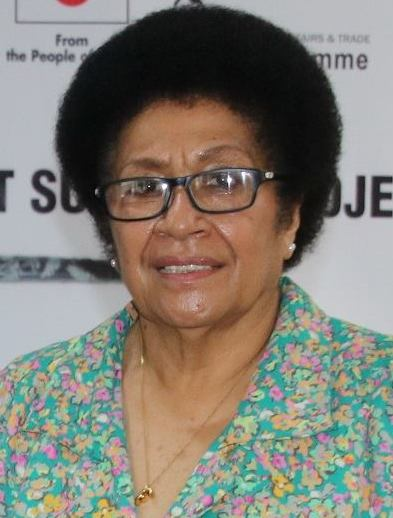

1st Speaker of the Parliament
- In office 6 October 2014 – 22 December 2018
- Prime Minister: Frank Bainimarama
- Preceded by: Office established
- Succeeded by: Epeli Nailatikau

Personal details
- Born: 1946
- Died: 22 December 2018 (aged 71–72)
- Party: FijiFirst
- Spouse: Inoke Luveni
- Education: Adi Cakobau School
- Alma mater: Fiji School of Medicine

Jiko Fatafehi Luveni (c. 1946 – 22 December 2018) was a Fijian politician and Speaker of the Parliament of Fiji. She was a member of the FijiFirst party before resigning her party membership in order to take up the position of Speaker. This was because the Fijian Speaker is not a Member of Parliament and cannot be a member of a political party pursuant to section 77(1)(a) and section 77(7)(b)(ii) of the Fijian Constitution.

== Early life ==
The daughter of a former shopkeeper turned shipping magnate, Luveni came from the village of Nukuni on the island of Ono-i-Lau, in the Lau archipelago. She was educated at Lautoka Fijian School and then at Nabua Secondary School in Suva, before enrolling in Adi Cakobau School in Sawani. She graduated from the Fiji School of Dentistry in 1967, the first Fijian woman to do so. After graduation, she worked for twenty years for the Ministry of Health, before working for the United Nations Population Fund as project manager for reproductive health from 1987 to 2002. She resigned three years ahead of the expiry of her term to take up a post as HIV project officer for the Ministry of Health, working as project manager for Fiji Network for People Living with HIV, a non-governmental organization.

From 2007 to 2008 Luveni served on the board of the interim Fiji Sports Council.

== Political career ==
In January 2008 Luveni was appointed Minister of Health and then as Minister of Social Welfare, Women and Poverty Alleviation in the interim government headed by Prime Minister Commodore Voreqe Bainimarama. She was also co-chair of a government task team established to make recommendations regarding "social cultural identity and nation building" for the proposed People's Charter for Change, Peace and Progress.

In 2013 Luveni indicated that she would stand as part of Bainimarama's proposed political party. She was elected Chairperson of the Lau Provincial Council in April 2014, succeeding Filipe Bole, but after being announced as a parliamentary candidate for the FijiFirst party in July 2014, she resigned that post after only three months in office. She was succeeded by Ilisoni Taoba. In the 2014 election she received 2,296 votes and was elected to parliament as the 14th highest-polling Fiji First candidate. She resigned her seat immediately following the election in order to become Speaker, the first Fijian woman to hold the position. Her place as an MP was taken by Laisenia Tuitubou. She was formally elected Speaker on October 6, 2014.

== Death ==
On 22 December 2018, Luveni died at the age of 72.
