= Perumal Mupnar =

Fijian politician

Member of House of Representatives (Fiji) Yasawa Nawaka Open Constituency
- In office 2001–2006
- Preceded by: Gunasagaran Gounder
- Succeeded by: Adi Sivia Qoro

Nadi Rural Indian Communal Constituency
- In office 2006–2006
- Preceded by: Gunasagaran Gounder
- Succeeded by: vacant

Personal details
- Party: Fiji Labour Party

Perumal Mupnar is a former Fijian politician of Indian Tamil descent, who held the Yasawa Nawaka Open Constituency in the House of Representatives for the Fiji Labour Party in the parliamentary election of 2001. In the parliamentary election held on 6–13 May 2006, he transferred to the Nadi Rural Indian Communal Constituency and held it for the FLP.

He was appointed a Senator following the 1999 election.

In 2003 he was one of the 14 FLP parliamentarians offered a cabinet position in the multi - party cabinet by Laisenia Qarase. He was offered the portfolio of Ministry for Transport but the FLP members did not take up the offer as they regarded the portfolios to be trivial.

After the 2006 general election, he became the Fiji Labour Party Whip in the House of Representatives.

He fell out with FLP leader, Mahendra Chaudhry, after speaking out against Chaudhry's choice of Senators following the 2006 election.
