= Siromi Turaga =

Fijian politician

The Honourable Siromi Turaga MP
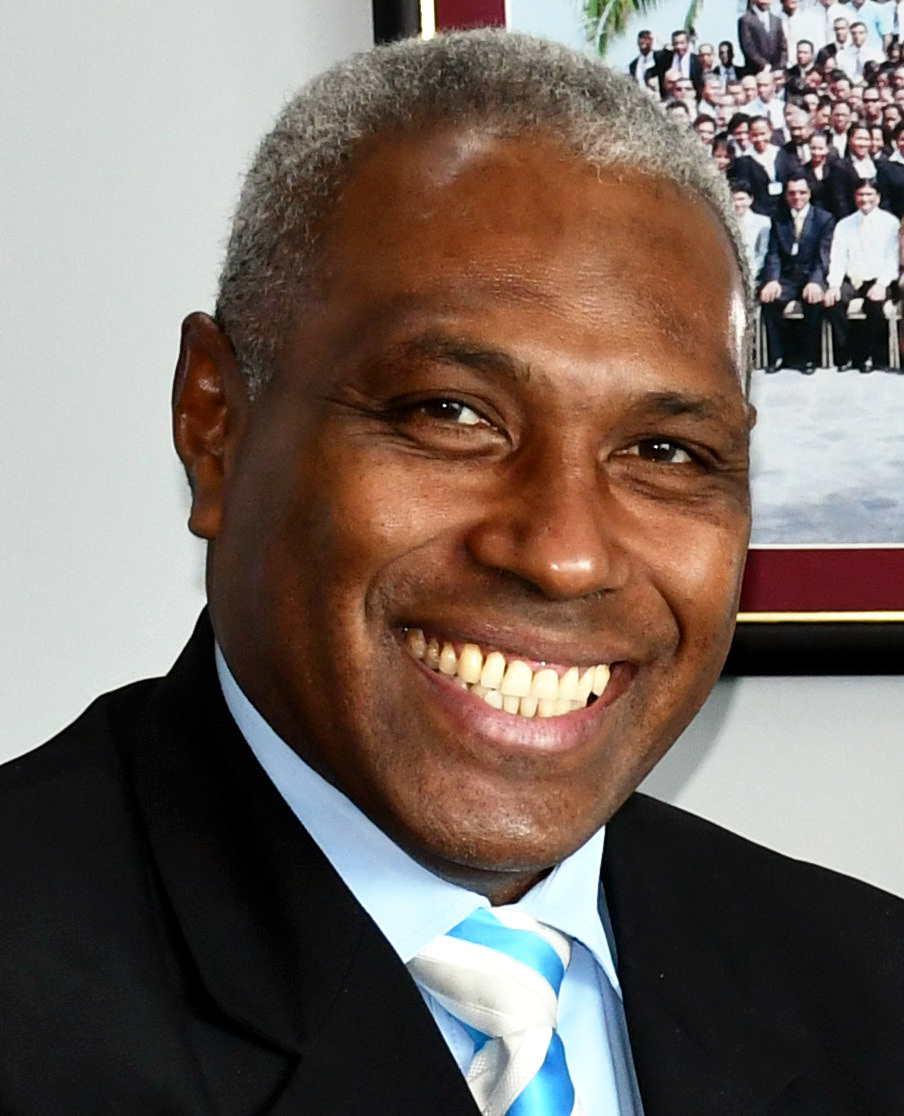
- Turaga in 2023

35th Attorney-General of Fiji
- In office 24 December 2022 – 5 June 2024
- Prime Minister: Sitiveni Rabuka
- Preceded by: Aiyaz Sayed-Khaiyum
- Succeeded by: Graham Leung

Minister for Justice
- In office 24 December 2022 – 13 October 2026
- Prime Minister: Sitiveni Rabuka
- Preceded by: Aiyaz Sayed-Khaiyum

Member of the Fijian Parliament for PA List
- Incumbent
- Assumed office 14 December 2022

Personal details
- Born: 1967 or 1968 (age 57–58) Tovulailai, Fiji
- Party: People's Alliance

Siromi Dokonivalu Turaga is a Fijian lawyer, politician, and former cabinet minister who served as Attorney-General of Fiji from 2022 to 2024 and justice minister from 2022 to 2026. He is a member of the People's Alliance.

Turaga was born in Tovulailai on Nairai in the Lomaiviti Islands and educated at AOG Primary School in Kinoya and Central Fijian School in Nausori. After studying in Australia on a Fijian Affairs Board scholarship he attended the University of the South Pacific, where he studied history and politics, and Saint Peter's University in the United States, where he studied political science. He joined the Fijian civil service in 1991 as a cadet in the prime minister's office, and later studied law. Admitted as a lawyer in 1999, he worked for the Attorney-General's office before being appointed a magistrate in 2012. In April 2020 during the COVID-19 pandemic he acquitted two men of breaching a curfew on the grounds that the charge was defective as the Prime Minister had no power to order arrests under the Public Health Act. The ruling was subsequently set aside by the High Court, and in May 2020 his contract as a magistrate was not renewed. He later claimed that he was fired for ruling against the government.

In May 2022 he was announced as a People's Alliance candidate for the 2022 Fijian general election. During the election campaign he said that he supported jailing FijiFirst leaders Frank Bainimarama and Aiyaz Sayed-Khaiyum if there were charges that supported it.

He was elected to the Parliament of Fiji with 2860 votes. On 24 December 2022 he was appointed Attorney-General in the coalition government of Sitiveni Rabuka.

In March 2024 he was investigated by police over his handling of a 2022 divorce case. On 5 June 2024 he was stripped of his role as Attorney-General over advice on an MP's pay rise. He was replaced by Graham Leung.

He resigned as justice minister in October 2026 after an intimate video was posted to his Facebook profile.
