= Counter Revolutionary Warfare Unit =

First Meridian Squadron
- Cap badge of the Republic of Fiji Military Forces
- Active: 1987-2000
- Country: Fiji
- Branch: Army
- Type: Special forces
- Role: Close protection Counter-Revolutionary Warfare; Counter Terrorism; Special operation Unconventional warfare
- Size: One squadron. Around 80 men after establishment
- Part of: Republic of Fiji Military Forces
- Garrison/HQ: Suva

Commanders
- Colonel-in-Chief: President of Fiji
- Notable commanders: Ilisoni Ligairi

The Counter Revolutionary Warfare Unit or CRWU was the common name for the First Meridian Squadron, the unit's formal name, which had been disbanded in 2000. It was a special forces group of the Republic of Fiji Military Forces, and was the brainchild of former Military Commander and former Prime Minister, Major-General Sitiveni Ligamamada Rabuka.

The unit had gained notoriety in Fiji for being involved in the Fijian 2000 coup d'état and the subsequent court martial of the renegade CRW soldiers involved, as well as being accused of attempting to assassinate Frank Bainimarama after he took power by overthrowing the illegal, civilian, Fijian government that took power from Prime Minister Mahendra Chaudhry in the 2000 Fijian coup d'état. Its founding officer Ilisoni Ligairi had also gained notoriety alongside his unit for participating in the mutinies.

== Origin ==
Although Rabuka was mainly responsible for his initiating the unit's existence, it is widely regarded that the unit's founding father, organizer and director was former British 22nd Regiment Special Air Service officer, Major Ilisoni Ligairi BEM, a retired SAS Permanent Staff instructor who, upon returning to Fiji for retirement after serving a 20-year stint with the 22 and 21 SAS regiments in Great Britain in 1984, was called up for service at the request of Sitiveni Rabuka to form the elite unit in 1987.

=== Formation ===
On 15 May 1987, Ligairi, given the temporary rank of captain at the time, began working on the selection of a tightly knit Close Protection Group (CPG) for tasks ranging from bodyguard and close protection mainly for Rabuka and visiting VIP personnel and intelligence gathering to specialist EOD and counter insurgency work. He modeled the new group and its concepts around the selection criteria and other elements on the SAS.

As more interested soldiers applied for the challenging selection course, the unit evolved steadily under Ligairi's supervision from C.P group to C.R.W (Counter Revolutionary Warfare Unit), trained with the latest techniques in Close Quarters Battle and Counter-terrorism, and tasked with being on 24-hour standby for any terrorist activity that posed a threat to the small island nation.

At one point, a review on the unit had recommended the dissolution of the CRW in 1995 as they acted like mercenaries instead of actually conducting their duties.

== Operations ==
Most of their operations were kept a closely guarded secret. As their responsibilities increased so did their roles. By 1997 the CRW's size had increased twofold and Ligairi introduced new troops into the squadron, Air and Boat. The unit also changed its name: First Meridian Squadron. It was now a small fully fledged Special Forces group. Their training and exercises were conducted in joint with U. S. Navy SEALs and MI6 as well as operating as a member of the newly formed PASOC (Pacific Special Operations Command). After 12 years of nurturing the unit and introducing the concept of Special Warfare, Ligairi retired from the Fiji Military Forces in February 1999.

They have also trained with Australian, British and New Zealand special forces.

== Mutiny ==
The unit continued to function in its primary roles, their secrecy and professionalism shrouded in an aura of mystique common in special forces worldwide until on 19 May 2000 they hit the local and world news headlines when a number of their members took the new ethnic Indian Prime Minister Mahendra Chaudhry and his Labour-led coalition government of Fiji hostage at the Parliament of Fiji complex led by failed business entrepreneur George Speight and Ilisoni Ligairi. Reports have been said that the decision by Frank Bainimarama to disband the CRW had also fueled the mutiny.

The mutiny that took place at Fiji's Queen Elizabeth Barracks in Suva on 2 November 2000, resulted in the death of four loyal soldiers. Five of the rebels were subsequently beaten to death after their capture over their involvement in the mutiny. A total of 42 soldiers from the Counter Revolutionary Warfare Unit were subsequently convicted of involvement in the mutiny.

After this incident, the unit was officially disbanded and its members dishonorably discharged. Many complained of not being paid properly by the Fiji Government for their service.

Lieutenant Colonel Viliame Seruvakula of the Third Fiji Infantry Regiment in 2001 had said the creation of the CRW was not the right thing to do as the military was not trained to face their own kind.

== Criticism ==
Critics have said that the CRW was formed to be loyal to its commanding officers instead of being loyal to the military and the country.

The CRW was compared to the Praetorian Guard, being used for a violent solution in case that anyone "tried to do to him what he did to the Bavadra and then Mara governments in 1987."

== Post-CRWU disbandment ==
Ballu Khan, a prominent and somewhat controversial entrepreneur of Indian descent, has employed at least eight former CRW unit members as drivers and bodyguards. This has drawn the ire of the Fiji Military and Colonel Pita Driti, the Land Forces Commander, has warned Khan that if any of the soldiers cause problems for the government, the military will be "out to get him first". Some ex-CRWU operators were spotted in Papua New Guinea conducting security work.

Six ex-CRWU officers were arrested and charged for plotting to assassinate Frank Bainimarama with one of the accused not showing up himself in court.

Ligairi had created a security company called Ronin High Risk Company and had defended its establishment, saying that it doesn't threaten Fiji's national security.
