= Women in Fiji =

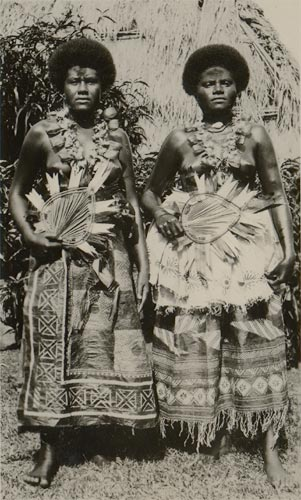
- Native Fijian women, 1935.

Gender Inequality Index
- Value: 0.318 (2021)
- Rank: 77th out of 191

Global Gender Gap Index
- Value: 0.676 (2022)
- Rank: 106th out of 146

Women in Fiji live in or are from the Republic of Fiji. On March 8, 2007, The Fiji Times ONLINE described Fijian women as playing an important role in the fields of economic and social development in Fijian society. The women of the Republic of Fiji are the "driving force" in health service as nurses and medical doctors. They are also key players and managers in the tourism and entertainment industries, as well as teachers in the field of education.

According Vilimaina Rakaseta "the presence of very young children and larger family sizes contribute to the low level of labour force participation of Fijian and Indian women in Fiji." By culture and tradition, a woman in Fiji lives in a paternalistic and patriarchal society wherein she has a secondary role at home performing household chores that include cooking meals and cleaning the house. As community and village members women are treated as subservient to men.

The National Council of Women of Fiji was founded in 1968. Anaseini Qionibaravi became the first female member of the Senate of Fiji, Taufa Vakatale the first female Deputy Prime Minister in 1997, and Teimumu Kepa the first female Leader of the Opposition. Nazhat Shameem was the first female judge in Fiji (upon her appointment as a Judge of the High Court of Fiji in 1999). She was also the first woman to serve as a prosecutor. In 2008, Shameem and Jocelynne Scutt became the first females to sit on the Court of Appeal of Fiji.

== Eating customs ==
By tradition, most of the cooking is performed by Fijian women. Indo-Fijian cuisine may include food made from starch and involves the use of relishes made from vegetables. If available, meat and fish are also eaten. Flatbread may be made from locally grown rice or from imported flour. For religious reasons Hindu Indo-Fijians avoid consuming beef and Muslim Indo-Fijians avoid consuming pork.

== Violence against women ==
Violence against women in Fiji is recognised to be "pervasive, widespread and a serious national issue" in the Pacific Island region. Fiji's rates of violence against women are "among the very highest in the world". The Fiji Women's Crisis Centre reports that 64% of women who have been in intimate relationships have experienced physical or sexual violence from their partner, including 61% who were physically attacked and 34% who were sexually abused.

The 2006 Fijian coup d'état created conditions which exacerbated the presence of violence against women in Fijian society, especially in the public sector. Conventional attitudes about the place of women in Fijian society perpetuate the normalisation of violence against women and permeate extended family groups, the local authorities and the judiciary. Customary and religious practices like bulubulu (forgiveness ceremonies) deal with domestic violence cases within the family, usually either precluding prosecution for the perpetrator or reducing their sentence.

== See also ==
- Fiji Women's Crisis Centre
