= Fiji Law Society =

- Type: Bar association
- Region served: Fiji
- Website: fijilawsociety.com

The Fiji Law Society is the official body that registers and regulates the activity of all lawyers in Fiji. Historically, the President of the Fiji Law Society was a member ex officio of the Judicial Service Commission.

The Fiji Law Society condemned the military coup which deposed the government of Prime Minister Laisenia Qarase on 5 December 2006. Fiji Times and Fiji Village reported on 9 December that the society had barred seven military lawyers from practicing, and warned any lawyers against accepting the positions of Attorney-General or Solicitor-General in the interim government. After an interim government was announced on 5–9 January 2007, the Society recognized its reality, but not its legality.

The Society condemned what it saw as interference in the Judiciary by the military-backed government, after Chief Justice Daniel Fatiaki and Chief Magistrate Naomi Matanitobua were sent on forced leave on 3 January 2007, and Anthony Gates sworn in as Acting Chief Justice on 16 January.

Not all members of the Society supported its stance against the interim government. Rajendra Chaudhry, son of former Mahendra Chaudhry, a former Prime Minister and the first Minister for Finance in the interim administration, spoke out on 24 January 2007, objecting to what he saw as personal opinions held by Sharma and Draunidalo being presented as official positions of the Fiji Law Society - without consulting its members, many of whom shared his concerns, he claimed. He called for a special meeting to deal with the issue, and threatened to join a breakaway body if his grievances were not addressed. The next day, Draunidalo announced that Sharma had ordered such a meeting, in order to "crush" internal opposition to its anti-coup stance.

The Fiji Human Rights Commission (FHRC) announced on 26 January 2007 that it had commenced legal proceedings against the FLS for suspending the practicing certificates of five Military lawyers on 7 December 2006. The FHRC was seeing an injunction to allow Colonel Mohammed Aziz, the Military's Director of Legal Services, and one other Military lawyer to resume practice. Aziz said the suspension made it impossible for him and his fellow-military lawyers to represent their clients, and that the decision was biased because he and the FLS President were opposing counsel in an upcoming trial.

Devanesh Sharma was elected to replace Graeme Leung as President of the Fiji Law Society on 9 September 2006, with Tupou Draunidalo as vice-president. On 28 September 2007, at the Annual General Meeting, Suva lawyer Isireli Fa, was elected president of the Fiji Law Society. On 27 September 2008, Fa was succeeded as president by Dorsami Naidu, who held the position continuously until 14 June 2014, when he was succeeded by Peter Knight. Between 2016 and 2020 Laurel Vaurasi served as the first female to be elected president of the Society.
