= Jahir Khan =

Mohammed Jahir Khan is a former senior Fijian police officer of Indian descent. In May 2007, he resigned from the position of Senior Superintendent to take up his new post in Solomon Islands as the new Police Commissioner. He held this position until May 2008, when he was reportedly asked to step down by Solomon Islands Prime Minister Derek Sikua.

Upon Khan's departure from the Solomons, the Solomon Times reported that he praised RAMSI for its commitment, whereas ABC Radio Australia reported that he criticised it for its lack of consulting of the Solomon Islands Police Force.
