= Suliana Siwatibau =

Fijian political activist

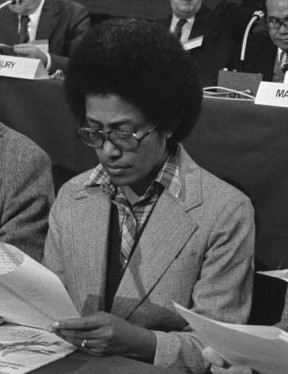
- Siwatibau in 1981

Personal details
- Born: Suliana Kaloumaira
- Spouse: Savenaca Siwatibau

Suliana Siwatibau (née Kaloumaira) is a former Fijian political activist, who served as the Chairperson of the Pacific Centre for Public Integrity (PCPI) as of January 2007. She has also chaired the Coalition for Democracy and Peace.

== Relations with the Qarase government ==
Siwatibau led a group called Concerned Mothers Group Against the Bill in opposition to the Laisenia Qarase's government's Reconciliation, Tolerance, and Unity Bill. She said on 16 June 2005 that the widespread opposition to the legislation was motivated not only by its contents, but also because of what she said was the government's unwillingness to proceed with its development in a transparent and consultative process. Opposing amnesty for perpetrators of political crimes, she called instead for more direct compensation of the victims of such crimes. "I do not see why they want to claim for compensation when this could be done through the Ministry of Labour on the workmen's compensation of something like F$20,000," she said.

Siwatibau expressed concern that the legislation threatens the independence of the judiciary. She also said she was alarmed that it would have a corrupting effect on the minds and character of the future generation, which would threaten the future stability and prosperity of the nation. Children, she said, should not be exposed to this "coup culture".

Reacting to the decision of the Great Council of Chiefs to endorse the bill, Siwatibau said on 29 July that they had not been given enough time to deliberate on the matter. Over four fifths of the Great Council members are delegates of the country's fourteen Provincial Councils, which all endorsed the bill – something which came as no surprise to Siwatibau as they had been briefed only by the government and were required to make a decision on the spot, without being given the opportunity to hear alternative viewpoints. At the very least, she said, the Provincial Councils should have been given a Fijian translation of the bill.

== The 2006 coup ==
In late 2006 she condemned the Republic of Fiji Military Forces for having executed a military coup on 5 December.

== Personal life ==
A native of Moturiki Island in the Lomaiviti archipelago, Siwatibau was married to the late academic leader and former Vice-Chancellor of the University of the South Pacific, Savenaca Siwatibau, from 1966 till his death in 2003. They had three sons – Simione Ramacake, Ropate Rakula, and Atunaisa Taleasiga – and one daughter, Asenaca Tania Tuivanuavou.
