= Nikhat Shameem =

Fijian linguistics academic

Nikhat Shameem is a Fijian academic in the field of linguistics. Her research interests include language maintenance and shift of pidgins, creoles and minority languages, language teaching and assessment, and sociolinguistic surveys. Shameem also leads initiatives to preserve and revitalise the Fiji-Hindi language.

== Biography ==
Shameem was born and raised in Suva, Fiji, and studied education at the University of the South Pacific. She completed a diploma in teaching English as a second language, and a PhD in applied linguistics, at Victoria University of Wellington, New Zealand. She completed a master's degree in business administration at the University of Cumbria, England, graduating in 2019.

Shammem worked for UNICEF in Nigeria, Zimbabwe and the Sudan, and returned to Fiji in 2018. In 2019, she was appointed interim director of the Fiji Higher Education Commission.

Shameem speaks Fiji Hindi and is active in preserving and revitalisting the language. In 2019, she published a book of poetry in Fiji Hindi, and is the only person to have written and published poetry in this language.

== Publications ==
- Shameem, N. (1992). Arrival, and other stories. Wellington Multicultural Educational Resource Centre.
- Shameem, N. (2019). Let the conch speak. Nikhat Shameem.
