= Imrana Jalal =

Fijian lawyer and activist

Imrana Jalal, also known as Patricia Jalal, is a Fijian lawyer and activist of Indian descent.

== Biography ==
Jalal served as a Human Rights Commissioner on the Fiji Human Rights Commission, and human rights advisor to the Pacific Regional Rights Resource Team and the United Nations United Nations Development Program and as a member of the Geneva-based International Commission of Jurists, to which she was elected in May 2006. She is a founding member of the Fiji Women's Rights Movement. She continues to sit on its board as a non-residential Permanent Founding Member. She is associated with the international networks Women Living Under Muslim Law (Pakistan), and the Asia Pacific Forum for Women, Law and Development (Thailand).

Jalal worked at the Asian Development Bank in Manila, Philippines for 7 years, as a Principal Social Development Specialist (Gender & Development). Jalal was appointed to the Inspection Panel of the World Bank in January 2018 for a term of 5 years. She was made Chair of the Inspection Panel in December 2018 and will hold that position until June 2021, making her a Vice-President of the World Bank. Jalal is currently working full-time and is based in Washington, D.C., US, at the World Bank HQ. The Inspection Panel is the World Bank's international accountability mechanism, receiving complaints against the Bank's projects and investments in the developing world.

In January 2023 she was awarded the Ruth Bader Ginsburg Medal of Honour by the World Jurists Association for her work on strengthening the rule of law.

== 2006 coup ==
Jalal is an international human rights lawyer and women's rights activist known as an outspoken opponent of the Military regime that seized power on 5 December 2006. She was until recently a gender specialist at the Asian Development Bank in Manila. In January 2018 she was appointed as an Inspection Panel member of the World Bank's Inspection Panel. In December 2018 she will take over as Chair of the Panel. The Inspection Panel is the World Bank's accountability mechanism.

The Fiji Times reported on 11 December 2006 that she had filed a complaint on 5 December, alleging that an anonymous male caller had threatened to publish embarrassing details about Jalal's personal life, if she did not stop opposing the Military junta that had taken power. "I am not pro-Qarase. I am pro-democracy and for the rule of law," the Times quoted her as having said the previous day (10 December). She claimed the call had been traced to a telephone box close to the Queen Elizabeth Barracks at Nabua.

The Fiji Sun later clarified on 15 December that she accused the anonymous caller of threatening her with rape. Military spokesman Major Neumi Leweni denied any knowledge of the threats. On 19 December, the Fiji Sun quoted Josaia Rasiga, the Police Criminal Investigations Director, as saying that Jalal had lodged a complaint that was being investigated.

On 14 December, the Military administration terminated Jalal's membership of the board of Posts Fiji. The Fiji Times reported on 20 December that she had refused to accept her termination, and sent apologies for her absence from a meeting while traveling. A source told the Times that she had warned the board chairman, Mahendra Patel, that if he withheld any papers from her, he would later have to answer for it in a court of law.

On 23 December, Commodore Frank Bainimarama, Commander of the Republic of Fiji Military Forces, accused Jalal, along with women's rights campaigner Virisila Buadromo, of having published his personal e-mail address and mobile telephone number in newspapers, which was creating difficulties for him.

== Personal life ==
Jalal, who hails from Suva, Fiji, has been married since 2003 to an indigenous Fijian chief, Ratu Sakiusa Tuisolia. He, too, was dismissed by the Military from a senior civil service position, as chief executive officer of Airports Fiji Limited.
