= Buca Bay =

Bay in Fiji

Coordinates: 16.660°S 179.857°E

Buca Bay is an isolated area on the Fijian island of Vanua Levu. The four villages within this bay are Vunikura, Loa, Buca and Tukavesi. It serves as a terminus for ferries that cross between Vanua Levu and Taveuni.

Electricity is an uncertain factor in Buca Bay, with different villages opting for different source of power including village generator, individual private generator, solar power and Hydro.

Most inhabitants are small farmers, or try to make a living working in other cities or villages in Vanua Levu. Buca Bay is accessible by bus from Savusavu, about 65 kilometres (40 mi) away via the Hibiscus Highway. Upgrading of the rural road was announced in 2011.

Opposite the bay is the island of Kioa, inhabited by Tuvaluans relocated due to overcrowding and lack of adequate food supplies on their home island. The island of Rabi is also visible from Buca Bay.

Natuvu is the site of a new clinic (The Mission at Natuvu Creek), specializing in eye, dental and non-invasive medical treatment. The clinic was scheduled to be operational in February 2008 with water and fuel service at the jetty for yachts and boats. Permanent moorings for short term stays were also planned.
