= Sakiusa Tuisolia =

Fijian chief

Ratu Sakiusa Tuisolia also known as Tu Saki is a Fijian chief from the province of Naitasiri, an economist and businessman, and a former civil servant who served for seven years as an economist with the Ministry of Finance and National Planning, then another seven years as Chief Policy Adviser to three successive Fijian Prime Ministers and was also Deputy CEO in the Office of the Prime Minister. He is married to Fijian lawyer Imrana Jalal.

From 2003 to 2006, Tuisolia was chief executive officer of the government-owned Airports Fiji Limited. He was dismissed by the military regime a few days after the 2006 Fijian coup d'état, on 12 December. When the Military accused him of "financial discrepancies", however, he reacted angrily, saying that was "a total and blatant lie". They are making these wild and falsified allegations to justify the coup. He accused the Military of conducting a witch hunt against him because he was known to be anti-coup and anti-military.

In February 2008 he was charged with 22 counts of abuse of office and 22 counts of fraud by the Fiji Independent Commission Against Corruption. He subsequently resigned as president of the Fiji Rugby Union. He was acquitted of all charges in November 2010. Following the trial, he moved to the Philippines.

In December 2009 he and his wife were charged by FICAC for illegally operating their business, a fish and chip shop. This was reduced to a single count of giving false information to a public servant, The case was dropped by the regime in June 2011.

In 2009, Tuisolia was appointed Pacific Ocean 2020 Coordinator by the International Union for Conservation of Nature. He currently works as a country representative for the Global Green Growth Institute.
