= 2000 Fijian mutinies =

Mutinies occurring during a civilian coup d'état

Two military mutinies took place in connection with the civilian coup d'état that occurred in Fiji in 2000, the first while the rebellion instigated by George Speight was in progress, and the second four months after it had ended.

== The Sukunaivalu Barracks mutiny (7 July 2000) ==
On 7 July 2000, rebel soldiers supporting George Speight overran the Sukunaivalu Barracks in Labasa, the largest town on the northern island of Vanua Levu.

== The Queen Elizabeth Barracks mutiny (2 November 2000) ==
The second mutiny, which took place on 2 November 2000 at Suva's Queen Elizabeth Barracks, was led by Captain Shane Stevens. It left three soldiers dead. In the aftermath of the failed attempt to depose the Military Commander, Commodore Frank Bainimarama, four of the rebels were tortured and killed by loyal soldiers.

=== Court martial ===
On 16 August 2005, the Fiji Court of Appeal delivered a landmark ruling, ordering a retrial of 20 soldiers from the Counter Revolutionary Warfare Unit (CRW) who had been convicted in a court martial of participating in the 2000 coup and in a subsequent mutiny in November 2000, and sentenced to prison terms of between three and six years.

== Bibliography ==
- Trnka, S. (2011). State of Suffering: Political Violence and Community Survival in Fiji. United States: Cornell University Press., ISBN 9780801461880 Read
- Pretes, M. (2008). Coup: Reflections on the Political Crisis in Fiji. United States: ANU E Press., ISBN 9781921536373 Read
- Baba, T., Nabobo-Baba, U., Field, M. (2005). Speight of Violence: Inside Fiji's 2000 Coup. Australia: Pandanus Books., ISBN 9781740761703 Read
