= Shaista Shameem =

Fijian lawyer and university administrator

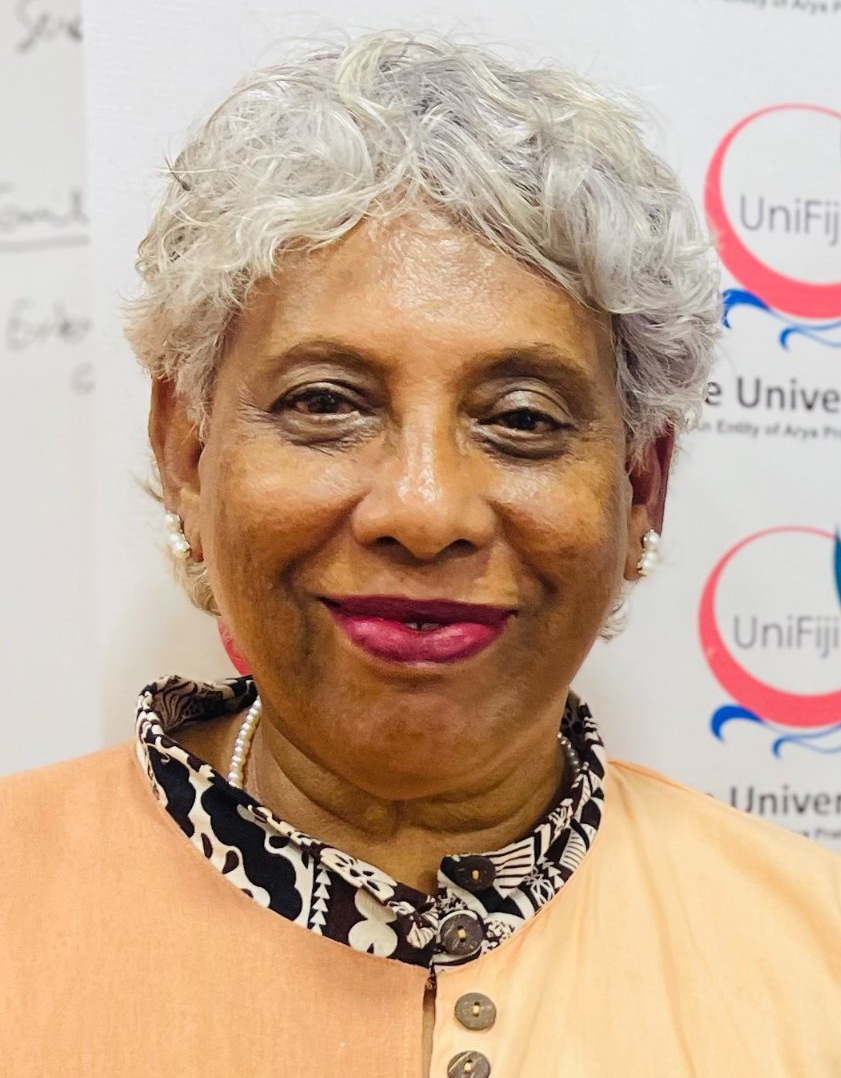
- Shameem in 2023

Director of the Fiji Human Rights Commission
- In office 2002–2007

Chairperson of the Fiji Human Rights Commission
- In office 2007–2009

Ombudsman of Fiji
- In office 2007–2009

United Nations Special Rapporteur on the Use of Mercenaries
- In office 2004–2005

Chairperson of the United Nations Working Group on the Use of Mercenaries
- Incumbent
- Assumed office 2009

Personal details
- Relatives: Nazhat Shameem (sister); Nikhat Shameem (sister)
- Education: University of the South Pacific; University of Auckland; University of Waikato
- Occupation: Lawyer, academic

Shaista Shameem is a Fijian lawyer. She was the director of the Fiji Human Rights Commission (FHRC) from 2002 to 2007, and its director and chairperson from 2007 to 2009. A graduate of the University of the South Pacific, she holds a PhD in sociology from the University of Waikato and a Masters in Law from the University of Auckland. She also holds a Doctorate in Juridical Science.

After working in the media and as a sociology lecturer in New Zealand, Shameem returned to Fiji and was involved in the constitutional case of Chandrika Prasad v the State which reinstated the 1997 Constitution following the coup d'état of 2000 led by George Speight. She served in 2004-05 as United Nations Special Rapporteur on the Use of Mercenaries and has since 2005 been a member of the UN Working Group on Mercenaries. In 2005 Shameem was invited to assist a UN assessment of the courts in Timor-Leste, but was prevented from visiting the territory. In 2009 she was elected chair of the Working Group. She was a member of the advisory board of the Association for the Prevention of Torture (APT). She is currently the acting vice-chancellor of the University of Fiji and is Dean of the JDP School of Law.

== Personal life ==
Shaista's sister Nazhat Shameem is a judge, and another sister Nikhat Shameem is an academic linguist. Their father hailed from Multan, in present-day Pakistan, while their mother was born in Fiji.

== 2006 coup ==
On 5 January 2007, Shameem published a report defending the December 2006 military coup, alleging that the previous government of Laisenia Qarase had committed human rights violations and crimes against humanity. She maintained that the 2006 elections were unlawful, and supported claims that Australia had intended to invade Fiji. Shameem acted as amicus curiae in the case of Qarase v the State where she submitted that the President of Fiji acted lawfully in dismissing the Prime Minister on 5 December 2006 and installing the military commander as Interim Prime Minister on 5 January 2007. While the High Court upheld this claim, in 2009 the Appeal Court overturned the decision and ruled that the 2006 coup and the President's action were unlawful.

== Ombudsman ==
On 16 July 2007, Fiji's Constitutional Offices Commission (COC) announced the appointment of Dr Shameem as Ombudsman, designated as an ex officio position to the chairperson of the Fiji Human Rights Commission. The international human rights NGO Human Rights Watch described her appointment as unlawful, and was highly critical of the FHRC's endorsement of the coup.

Shameen ceased to lead the FHRC in 2009 when it was reconstituted under new legislation.

In 2011, she strongly criticised the military-led government's Essential National Industries Employment decree, which "takes away nearly all collective bargaining rights in essential companies [and] virtually abolishes the right to strike". Shameem said the decree showed the government had abandoned its "previous consensus building approach", and adopted an autocratic mode of government, "diminish[ing] or remov[ing]" workers' rights.
