= Pita Driti =

Fijian soldier

Lieutenant Colonel Pita Driti is a former Fijian soldier who played a prominent role in the 2006 Fijian coup d'état. He served as the Land Force Commander of the Republic of Fiji Military Forces, the third most senior position in the Military.

Driti was educated at Suva Grammar School.

In the leadup to the coup, Driti accused the Australian government of infiltrating mercenaries into Fiji. He also demanded that Prime Minister Laisenia Qarase be investigated for attempting to remove RFMF commander Frank Bainimarama. In the aftermath of the coup he instigated a witch-hunt for critics of the military regime, who were rounded up and taken to the RFMF barracks in Suva, beaten and intimidated.

In June 2007 Driti was proposed for the position of High Commissioner to Malaysia. His appointment was repeatedly delayed after Malaysia refused to accept him. In September 2008 Suliasi Lutubula was appointed to the position.

In April 2009 he was made an Officer of the Order of Fiji.

In October 2009 Driti was proposed to lead a contingent of soldiers for the United Nations Assistance Mission for Iraq. In February 2010 the United Nations rejected the proposal on the basis that Driti was the subject of credible allegations of human rights abuse.

In October 2010 Driti and Tevita Mara were unexpectedly placed on extended leave and replaced as Land Force Commander and 3rd Fiji Infantry Regiment commander respectively. In May 2011 both were charged with sedition, and Driti was also charged with inciting mutiny. Mara subsequently fled to Tonga, causing a diplomatic incident. Driti was tried in November 2013, with the military regime alleging that he and Mara had plotted to remove Bainimarama from power. Despite being found not guilty by a panel of assessors, he was convicted of inciting mutiny. On 13 December 2013 he was sentenced to five years' imprisonment, with a minimum non-parole period of four years by judge Paul Madigan. He was granted weekend release from prison in December 2017.

Following his release in February 2018 Driti made a traditional apology to Bainimarama and senior RFMF officers.
