= Fiji Women's Crisis Centre =

Fijian non-governmental organization

The Fiji Women's Crisis Centre (FWCC) is a non-government organization (NGO) in Fiji. Established in 1984, it offers counselling and legal, medical, and practical support to woman and children victims of violence in Fiji.

== History ==
The Women's Crisis Centre started in August 1984. The founding group met in 1983, when women of a variety of races, nationalities, religions and beliefs, got together and expressed a fear about the number of sexual attacks on women in and around the city of Suva. The group was worried about the lack of support for women. There was no official body to provide help, so the women decided to work towards providing such a service themselves.

The centre is funded by donations and by small grants, occasionally from the government. It is a charitable trust affiliated to the National Council of Women. However, the National Council of Women has not provided much help to the centre; the WCC however still wished to be affiliated to the NCW. Presently, the centre is made up of about 30 women, mostly locals and some expatriates. Its aim is to continue to increase the number of local women members, and the Centre constantly works to this end.

Shamima Ali has served as a coordinator or director of FWCC for many years.

FWCC provides training for police so that they can better understand issues relating to sexual harassment and rape.

As of 2021 the centre employs 16 staff. It is governed by a board of four trustees.

== See also ==
- Violence against women in Fiji
- Sereima Lomaloma
