= Queen Elizabeth Barracks, Suva =

Fijian Army base

Queen Elizabeth Barracks is a Fijian Army base, located in the suburb of Nabua, in Suva and is the national headquarters of the Fijian military.

The barracks, commonly known as QEB, was the scene of an unsuccessful army mutiny on 2 November 2000. Four soldiers were killed, and four of the rebels were beaten to death after being captured. It was from QEB that the Fiji military coordinated its coup d'état on 5 December 2006.
