= Fiji Human Rights Commission =

Human rights authority in Fiji

The Fiji Human Rights Commission (FHRC) was created by presidential decree in 2009, succeeding the entity of the same name established as an independent statutory body under the 1997 Constitution of the Republic of the Fiji Islands.

== The 1997 Commission ==
The Constitution defined the Commission's purpose as to protect and promote human rights for the people of Fiji and to help build and strengthen a culture of human rights in Fiji.

The mandate of the Commission, set out in the Human Rights Commission Act 1999, was to educate the general public about human rights and to make recommendations to the government about matters affecting human rights. The Commission's complaints and legal divisions were empowered to receive complaints of alleged violations of human rights, investigate them, and seek to resolve the issues by conciliation or by referral to the Commission's legal division for court action. The Commission could refer complaints to the relevant ministry or department if the matter was not within the Commission's jurisdiction.

In 2007, the Fiji Human Rights Commission created controversy when its chairwoman Dr Shaista Shameem expressed support for the 2006 coup. Consequently, the FHRC was suspended from (and later resigned from) the regional network of human rights bodies, the Asia Pacific Forum, and from the International Co-ordinating Committee, the co-ordinating and accreditation body for national human rights institutions (NHRIs). A review by the ICC stated that the FHRC "lacked both credibility and independence". The interim Prime Minister Frank Bainimarama issued an assurance that his government was committed to upholding the law and protecting human rights as in the constitution.

The FHRC later commissioned an inquiry into the 2006 general election which had brought the subsequently deposed Prime Minister Laisenia Qarase to power. The Commission of Inquiry delivered a report which "identifie[d] deficiencies and anomalies at every stage of the election process", maintaining that the democratic legitimacy of Prime Minister Qarase's deposed government had been questionable.

In October 2007, Shameen criticised United Nations Human Rights Commissioner Louise Arbour for allegedly "only hearing one side of the story regarding what was happening in Fiji" – that is, for criticising Commodore Bainimarama's interim government.

During the 2009 Fijian constitutional crisis, the Fiji Human Rights Commission supported the then President, Ratu Josefa Iloilo, stating that "the President had no choice but to abrogate the 1997 Constitution after the Fiji Court of Appeal ruled that the interim government was illegal." Shameen also stated that the Commission would act as if the Bill of Rights part of the Constitution was still legally in effect. The Commission was closed by police for one day but then allowed to reopen.

== The 2009 Commission ==
In May 2009, President Iliolo's Human Rights Commission Decree 2009 (No. 11) reconstituted the institution, considerably reducing its independence. The Decree stipulated that "the functions, powers and duties of the Commission do not extend to receiving complaints against, or investigating, questioning or challenging, the legality or validity of the Fiji Constitution Amendment Act 1997 Revocation Decree 2009, or such other Decrees made or as may be made by the President", thus prohibiting it from challenging any extant or future Decrees whether or not they were compatible with human rights. Any complaints or proceedings already under way on such matters were annulled.

The new Commission, according to the Decree, was to have a chair appointed by the President, and two other members appointed by him on the advice of the Prime Minister. Notwithstanding provisions in the UN Paris Principles as to the security in office of NHRI members, Decree No. 11 stated that any of the three members could be removed from office by the President for matters such as "misbehaviour", or by giving one month's notice. The government had unlimited powers to give the Commission "general policy guidance", and was responsible for the structure and management of the body.

The appointments envisaged by the Decree, which removed Shaista Shameen from office as Chairwoman (and as Ombudsman, an office to which she had also been appointed), have never been made (as of October 2011); thus the Commission has since existed merely as an office and a staff group, but without the members required to direct its operations. Although there have been numerous allegations of serious human rights abuses in Fiji after the Decree, the Commission has not brought any proceedings in relation to them.

== See also ==
- Human rights in Fiji
