= List of heads of state of Fiji =

This article lists the heads of state of Fiji, from the establishment of the Kingdom of Fiji in 1871 to the present day.

Currently, the head of state of Fiji is the president of the republic, appointed by the Parliament for a three-year term under the terms of the Constitution of 2013.

The current president is Ratu Naiqama Lalabalavu. He was elected on 31 October 2024, and sworn in on 12 November 2024.

== Tui Viti (King of Fiji) (1871–1874) ==
| Name | Lifespan | Reign start | Reign end | Notes | Family | Image |
|---|---|---|---|---|---|---|
| Seru Epenisa Cakobau | c. 1815 – 1 February 1883 (aged c. 67–68) | 5 June 1871 | 10 October 1874 | Son of Tanoa Visawaqa | | Seru Epenisa Cakobau of Fiji |

Note that Cakobau had been the Vunivalu (Warlord/Paramount Chief) of Bau since 1852. He had long styled himself the Tui Viti (King of Fiji), but had not been recognised as such by other chiefs, and he exercised no direct authority outside his domain of Bau until he united the country under his leadership in 1871. His ancestors, going back as far as 1770, have often – erroneously – been listed as "kings" of Fiji.

== British period (1874–1970) ==
On 10 October 1874, Cakobau signed the Deed of Cession, that granted the British Empire sovereignty over the islands. From 1874 to 1970, the British monarch was Fiji's formal head of state.

| Name | Lifespan | Reign start | Reign end | Notes | Family | Image |
|---|---|---|---|---|---|---|
| Victoria | 24 May 1819 – 22 January 1901 (aged 81) | 10 October 1874 | 22 January 1901 | | Hanover | Victoria of the United Kingdom |
| Edward VII | 9 November 1841 – 6 May 1910 (aged 68) | 22 January 1901 | 6 May 1910 | Son of Victoria | Saxe-Coburg and Gotha | Edward VII of the United Kingdom |
| George V | 3 June 1865 – 20 January 1936 (aged 70) | 6 May 1910 | 20 January 1936 | Son of Edward VII | Saxe-Coburg and Gotha (until 1917); Windsor (from 1917) | George V of the United Kingdom |
| Edward VIII | 23 June 1894 – 28 May 1972 (aged 77) | 20 January 1936 | 11 December 1936 (abdicated) | Son of George V | Windsor | Edward VIII of the United Kingdom |
| George VI | 14 December 1895 – 6 February 1952 (aged 56) | 11 December 1936 | 6 February 1952 | Son of George V | Windsor | George VI of the United Kingdom |
| Elizabeth II | 21 April 1926 – 8 September 2022 (aged 96) | 6 February 1952 | 10 October 1970 | Daughter of George VI | Windsor | Elizabeth II of the United Kingdom |

=== Governors ===
The British monarch was represented by a governor, who acted on the advice of the British government.

== Queen of Fiji (1970–1987) ==
Fiji became an independent Commonwealth realm on 10 October 1970, and Elizabeth II assumed the role of Queen of Fiji.

| Name | Lifespan | Reign start | Reign end | Notes | Family | Image |
|---|---|---|---|---|---|---|
| Elizabeth II | 21 April 1926 – 8 September 2022 (aged 96) | 10 October 1970 | 6 October 1987 (deposed) | Daughter of George VI | Windsor | Elizabeth II of Fiji |

=== Governors-general ===
The Queen of Fiji was represented by a governor-general, who acted on the advice of the Fijian government.

| No. | Portrait | Name (Birth–Death) | Term of office | | | Monarch (Reign) |
| No. | Portrait | Name (Birth–Death) | Took office | Left office | Time in office | Monarch (Reign) |
|---|---|---|---|---|---|---|
| 1 | | Sir Robert Sidney Foster (1913–2005) | 10 October 1970 | 13 January 1973 | 2 years, 95 days | Elizabeth II |
| 2 | | Ratu Sir George Cakobau (1912–1989) | 13 January 1973 | 12 February 1983 | 10 years, 30 days | Elizabeth II |
| 3 | | Ratu Sir Penaia Ganilau (1918–1993) | 12 February 1983 | 6 October 1987 | 4 years, 236 days | Elizabeth II |

== Presidents (1987–present) ==
Fiji was proclaimed a republic on 7 October 1987, upon the deposition of the Fijian monarchy following two military coups.

| No. | Portrait | President | Took office | Left office | Time in office | Party | Election | Prime minister(s) |
|---|---|---|---|---|---|---|---|---|
| — | Sitiveni Rabuka | Major General; Sitiveni Rabuka (born 1948); Acting; Head of the Interim Military Government | 7 October 1987 | 5 December 1987 | 59 days | RFMF | — | — |
| 1 | Penaia Ganilau | Ratu Sir; Penaia Ganilau (1918–1993) | 5 December 1987 | 15 December 1993 † | 6 years, 10 days | Independent | 1987 | Mara; Rabuka |
| 2 | Kamisese Mara | Ratu Sir; Kamisese Mara (1920–2004) | 16 December 1993; Acting until 18 January 1994 | 29 May 2000 | 6 years, 165 days | Independent | 1994 | Rabuka; Chaudhry; Momoedonu |
| — | Frank Bainimarama | Commodore; Frank Bainimarama (born 1954); Acting; Head of the Interim Military Government | 29 May 2000 | 13 July 2000 | 45 days | RFMF | — | Qarase |
| 3 | Josefa Iloilo | Ratu; Josefa Iloilo (1920–2011) | 13 July 2000 | 5 December 2006 | 6 years, 145 days | Independent | 2000; 2006 | Qarase; Momoedonu; Qarase |
| — | Frank Bainimarama | Commodore; Frank Bainimarama (born 1954); Acting; Head of the Interim Military Government | 5 December 2006 | 4 January 2007 | 30 days | RFMF | — | Senilagakali |
| (3) | Josefa Iloilo | Ratu; Josefa Iloilo (1920–2011) | 4 January 2007 | 30 July 2009 | 2 years, 207 days | Independent | — | Bainimarama |
| 4 | Epeli Nailatikau | Ratu Brigadier General (Rtd); Epeli Nailatikau (1941–2026) | 30 July 2009; Acting until 5 November 2009 | 12 November 2015 | 6 years, 105 days | Independent | 2009 | Bainimarama |
| 5 | Jioji Konrote | Major General (Rtd); Jioji Konrote (born 1947) | 12 November 2015 | 12 November 2021 | 6 years | FijiFirst | 2015; 2018 | Bainimarama |
| 6 | Wiliame Katonivere | Ratu; Wiliame Katonivere (born 1964) | 12 November 2021 | 12 November 2024 | 3 years | People's Alliance (FijiFirst 2021–24) | 2021 | Bainimarama; Rabuka |
| 7 | Naiqama Lalabalavu | Ratu; Naiqama Lalabalavu (born 1953) | 12 November 2024 | Incumbent | 1 year, 336 days | People's Alliance | 2024 | Rabuka |

== See also ==
- Monarchy of Fiji
- President of Fiji
- Prime Minister of Fiji
