= Filipe Bole =

Fijian politician (1936–2019)

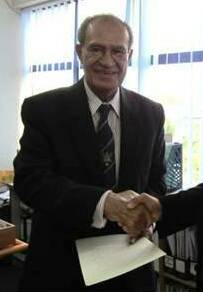
- Bole in 2012

Deputy Prime Minister of Fiji
- In office June 1992 – 1993 - ? Serving with Timoci Vesikula
- Prime Minister: Sitiveni Rabuka

Personal details
- Born: 23 August 1936
- Died: 19 June 2019

Filipe Nagera Bole CBE, CF (23 August 1936 – 19 June 2019) was a Fijian politician who hailed from the village of Mualevu on the island of Vanua Balavu in the Lau Group. He had a reputation as one of Fiji's few politicians untainted by scandal, and was noted for his moderate views. In October 2003, he endorsed calls for an end to racially segregated voting, saying that electing all members of the House of Representatives by universal suffrage would make voters and politicians think of the common national good, rather than communal interests.

== Education and early career ==
He was educated at Victoria University of Wellington, New Zealand, and at Auckland Teachers College. He subsequently worked as a teacher in Fiji, before going into the civil service where he served from 1972 to 1980 in a number of government departments. He was also a member of the Council of the University of the South Pacific in Suva from 1974 to 1980. He was Fiji's Ambassador to the United States and the United Nations from 1980 to 1983, when he became a project administrator of the Pacific Islands Development Program in Honolulu, Hawaii, where he remained until 1986.

== Political career ==
Returning to Fiji, he entered politics and served as Minister for Education in 1986 and 1987. Following two coups d'état in 1987, he was appointed Minister for Foreign Affairs, holding office till 1988, then served as Minister for Youth and Sport from 1989 to 1992. Bole was elected to the House of Representatives in the election held to restore democracy in 1992, and was subsequently appointed Foreign Minister again. Apart from a brief interruption in 1994, he remained in this post until 1997. Bole was also Deputy Prime Minister for a short time from June 1992 to 1993. He transferred from the House of Representatives to the Senate in 1994 but remained in the Cabinet. While remaining Minister for Foreign Affairs, he concurrently held portfolios as Minister for Civil Aviation and Tourism from 1995 to 1996, and as Minister for National Development in 1997. That year, he became Minister for Information, a post he held till 1999 when his Soqosoqo ni Vakavulewa ni Taukei was defeated in the parliamentary election that May, an election in which Bole himself failed to win the Suva City Fijian Communal Constituency.

In the 2001 election, Bole led the campaign of the Fijian Political Party, but it failed to win any seats. In June 2002, Bole founded the Fiji Democratic Party (FDP) as a merger of some members of the Fijian Political Party, the Christian Democratic Alliance, the Fijian Association Party, and the New Labour Unity Party. However, in early 2005, the FDP decided to officially disband and merge into the National Alliance Party, a new party founded by Ratu Epeli Ganilau, as a claimed successor to the defunct Alliance Party which ruled the country from 1967 to 1987. Bole went on to assume a leading role as a spokesman for the new party, and unsuccessfully contested the Samabula Tamavua Open Constituency for the party in the 2006 election.

Bole's last elective position was as Chairman of the Lau Provincial Council, from 12 July 2011 to April 2014, when he was succeeded by Jiko Luveni. His appointment was controversial: the day before taking office, he was defeated in his bid for the chairmanship by Adi Ateca Ganilau, daughter of former Prime Minister and President Ratu Sir Kamisese Mara by 17 votes to 15. She stepped aside in his favour, apparently under pressure from the military-backed regime in Suva, who were pursuing charges against Adi Ateca's brother, Roko Tevita Uluilakeba Mara.

== Policies ==
On 27 April 2005, he called for an overhaul of Fiji's education system. He advocated full government funding, saying that the present user-pays system puts a heavy financial burden on many parents. He also said that instruction in English only was creating difficulties for students not fluent in it.

On 1 August 2005, Bole called for a review of Fiji's electoral system to represent all races proportionally in the House of Representatives. This would, he said, get rid of the antagonistic racial politics that have characterized Fiji for many years. The common voters' role was "just toilet paper where everybody is just listed," and that in contests for open electorates, citizens were apt to vote on racial lines. "This fear of racial politics is still endemic among many in Fiji today and we cannot change it but perhaps to have proportionate voting system can bring our people together," Bole said.

On 21 May 2007, Bole was nominated to the position of Chairman at the Fiji Islands Revenue and Customs Authority. He was appointed to the three-year position by interim Finance Minister, Mahendra Chaudhry.

== Academic appointment ==
It was reported on 5 September 2006 that Bole had been appointed a Senior Fellow with the Centre for International and Regional Affairs at the University of Fiji.
