= Finau Mara =

Fijian politician (1957–2020)

Ratu Alifereti Finau Mara (1957 – 15 April 2020) was a Fijian lawyer, politician, and diplomat. He was best known as the eldest son of former Prime Minister and President Ratu Sir Kamisese Mara. Since December 2001, he held the official position of Roving Ambassador and High Commissioner, representing Fiji's interests in Pacific Island nations. It was reported on 13 March 2006 that he had been chosen to succeed his late father as Paramount Chief of the Lau Islands, but in 2009 the succession was still unclear, with Mara reportedly refusing to discuss the issue with the village elders.

== Education and career ==
Mara graduated from New Zealand's University of Otago with an LLB (Law) degree in 1983. This was followed by an LLM (Master's degree in Law) from Cambridge University in the United Kingdom in 1986. Meanwhile, he had served as a Legal Officer in the Attorney General's Chamber from 1984, rising to Principal Legal Officer in 1986. In 1987, he was appointed Fiji's Chief Administrative Officer for Foreign Affairs, and in 1991 he became Chargé d'affaires at the Fijian Embassy in Washington, D.C.

Upon returning to Fiji, Mara was elected to the House of Representatives in 1994 and served for a single term. During this time, he held Cabinet office as Minister for Fijian Affairs from 1997 to 1999, during which time he also served as Chairman of the Native Land Trust Board. He also led the Fijian Association Party from 1996 to 1998. In 1999 he was appointed to a diplomatic post, but returned to Fiji in the wake of the coup d'état that deposed his father from the Presidency in 2000. The following year, however, he took up his post as Roving Ambassador and High Commissioner.

On 13 August 2005, Foreign Minister Kaliopate Tavola said that Mara was being considered as a possible successor to Ratu Tevita Momoedonu as Ambassador to Japan. Momoedonu's term was due to expire in September, and he had indicated that he wished to return to Fiji. In the end, Mara was not appointed, however.

In 2006 Mara was appointed ambassador to the United States but did not take up the position. He was again appointed to the position in 2008. His departure from Fiji to take up the post was reportedly delayed by "internal processes" in the Ministry of foreign Affairs. The offer was eventually withdrawn with the government citing Mara's inability to meet a deadline due to protracted personal affairs. The Fijian ambassador to the United States as of December 2010 was Winston Thompson.

== Tui Nayau candidate ==
On 18 March 2005, it was announced that five elders from his home island of Lakeba had visited him in Suva to invite him to succeed his late father as Tui Nayau, or Paramount Chief of the Lau Islands. Although not strictly hereditary, the title is traditionally held by a male in the chiefly Vuanirewa Clan, a tradition his father reportedly wanted upheld. One village elder, who chose not to be named, said that Mara had both the blood ties and the modern education expected of a Paramount Chief. "He is a high chief, whose parents are both paramount chiefs and have strong blood ties with all the chiefly households in Fiji and Tonga, is young and can look after his people," the elder said.

Others expressed disappointment, however, that the elders had gone public before Ratu Finau had made a final decision on accepting the invitation, saying that the publicity was an insult to him and the other children of the late Ratu Mara.

As of July 2005, there was still no public announcement as to whether Mara had accepted the invitation to become the Tui Nayau, but his elder sister, Adi Ateca Ganilau, said that discussions between the family and the mataqali (clan) were ongoing. She said there was no time limit; her father had been installed only after three years of discussions.

In July 2006 Mara was endorsed by the Vuanirewa clan to succeed his late father as Tui Nayau, or Paramount Chief of Lau. A date for installation had yet to be finalized.

In October 2015 Mara was again elected to succeed his late father as Tui Nayau.

== Personal life ==
Mara had two children (Adi Lawedua Mara and Ratu Salesi Kinikinilau Mara) with Vitinia Buadromo.

Mara died on 15 April 2020.
