= Fiji Democratic Party =

Political party in Fiji

The Fiji Democratic Party (FDP) was a political party in Fiji. It was active between June 2002 and April 2005.

It was founded by Filipe Bole, a former Cabinet Minister, as a merger of the Soqosoqo ni Vakavulewa ni Taukei (which had dominated the government in the 1990s), the Fijian Association Party, the Christian Democratic Alliance, and the New Labour Unity Party. All but the last of these had been eliminated from Parliament in the parliamentary election of 2001. The party aimed to secure a niche in the middle ground of Fijian politics, offering a multiracial alternative to the Soqosoqo Duavata ni Lewenivanua/Conservative Alliance coalition of Prime Minister Laisenia Qarase (supported almost exclusively by indigenous Fijians) on the one hand, and the Fiji Labour Party of former Prime Minister Mahendra Chaudhry (supported mostly by Indo-Fijians) on the other. Among its policies was a proposal to abolish race-based voting and to introduce universal suffrage for all electorates (at present, 46 of the 71 seats in the House of Representatives represent ethnic communities and are elected from closed electoral rolls).

In April 2005, the FDP announced its own dissolution and merger with the newly formed National Alliance Party of Fiji, founded by Ratu Epeli Ganilau, a chief whose father and father-in-law both served as President of Fiji. Filipe Bole was appointed a spokesman for the new party.
