= 2015 Fijian presidential election =

Election of Jioji Konrote

- 12 October 2015

50 members of the Parliament of Fiji 25 votes needed to win
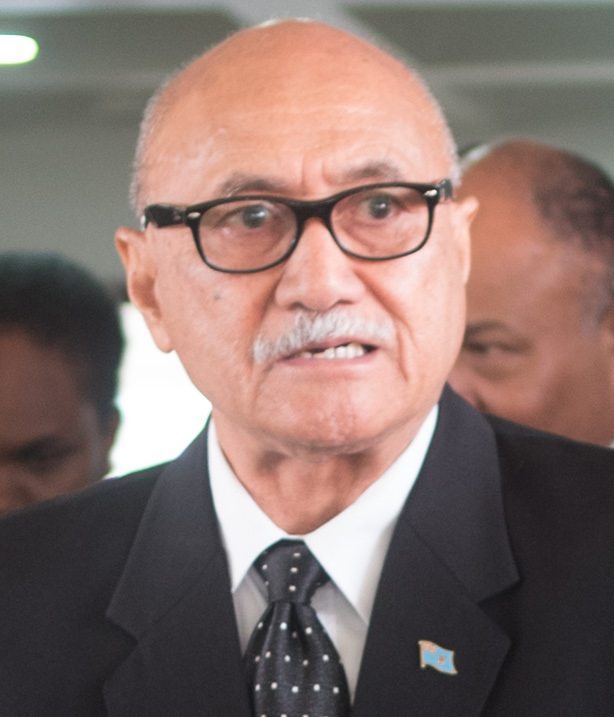

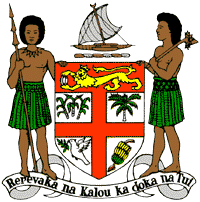
Nominee	Jioji Konrote	Ratu Epeli Gavidi Ganilau
Party	FijiFirst	Social Democratic Liberal Party
Electoral vote	31	14
Percentage	63.3%	28.6%
President before election
Ratu Epeli Nailatikau
Independent
Elected President
Jioji Konrote
FijiFirst

The first election for the office of President of Fiji since the new 2013 Constitution was drafted were held in Fiji on 12 October 2015. This was also the first time the President of Fiji was not elected by the Great Council of Chiefs.

Jioji Konrote was nominated by sitting Prime Minister F.V. Bainimarama and the FijiFirst Government. While the Leader of Opptition Ro Teimumu Kepa nominated Ratu Epeli Gavidi Ganilau, Son of the Late Former President Penaia Ganilau. Konrote beat Ganilau 31-14. The Honorables Prem Singh, Biman Prasad, and Roko Tupou Draunidalo voted to abstain. And the Honorable Ratu Naiqama Lalablavu was not Present at the time due to a suspension from Parliament. Critics Argue that the president should be a symbol of Unity, And Konrote was a MP and Cabinet Minister for the ruling FijiFirst Government.

== Results ==
Candidate	Party	Votes	%
Jioji Konrote	FijiFirst	31	68.89
Epeli Ganilau	Social Democratic Liberal Party	14	31.11
Total		45	100.00
Valid votes		45	97.83
Invalid/blank votes		1	2.17
Total votes		46	100.00
Registered voters/turnout		50	92.00
Source: The Fiji Village
