= Office of the Prime Minister (Fiji) =

Office of the Prime Minister of Fiji

- Valenivolavola ni Paraiminisita (Fijian) प्रधानमंत्री के कार्यालय (Fiji Hindi)
- Coat of arms of Fiji

Agency overview
- Jurisdiction: Government of Fiji
- Annual budget: ▼$14.8m FJD
- Ministers responsible: Sitiveni Rabuka, Prime Minister of Fiji; Sakiusa Tubuna, Assistant Minister for the Office of the Prime Minister
- Website: pmoffice.gov.fj

The Office of the Prime Minister (OPM) is a government office of Fiji responsible for coordinating the work of the prime minister and the cabinet under sections 91 and 92 of the Constitution of Fiji.

The Office of the Prime Minister is to provide coherent policy advice to the prime minister and coordinate, facilitate, monitor and evaluate government programs. It is also in charge of other government ministries.

== History ==
In 1970, the Chief Minister's Office, which it was called at that time, served the newly independent Fiji with a few staff. Ratu Sir Kamisese Mara was the first prime minister to occupy the office along with his permanent secretary Robert Sanders.

== Responsibilities ==
The office has jurisdiction over the Immigration Department responsible for the travel of Fijian citizens across the border. This includes the issuance of passports, entry and departure permits and processing of applications of citizenships. The office also facilitate funding to outer islands for community projects and oversees the administration of Rotuma, Kioa and Rabi Island councils.

== Divisions ==
- Executive Support Office (Permanent Secretary's Office) – responsible for providing executive support to the prime minister and permanent secretary.
- Cabinet Office – provides administrative and secretariat support to the cabinet.
- Corporate Services Division (CSD) – provides corporate support services to the office of the prime minister.
- Development Cooperation and Facilitation Division – responsible in conducting actions on offer of assistance to the government of Fiji by a donor country.
- Public Relations and Media Division – promotes the government intent by engaging with the community through the media.
- Client Services Division – engages with the general public about their concerns.
- Policy Division – responsible in analysing policies, programmes and key issues and providing recommendations and advice accordingly.
- Private Office – providing administrative support and services to the prime minister and his partner.
