= Ateca Ganilau =

Fijian chief (1951–2018)

Adi Ateca Moceiwaqa Mara Ganilau (1951 – 16 November 2018) was a Fijian public figure and the eldest daughter of the former Prime Minister and President, the late Ratu Sir Kamisese Mara. Later in life she made many statements to the press about her family and the government.

== Personal life ==
Ganilau married former National Alliance Party leader Ratu Epeli Ganilau in 1973. He was the son of the late Governor-General and President, Ratu Sir Penaia Ganilau.They had two sons and two daughters.

== Fiji History ==
Her father was Chief Minister when Fiji gained its independence from the United Kingdom, and held leadership positions until a coup d'état in the year 2000. Gunmen led by George Speight kidnapped the Prime Minister, Mahendra Chaudhry, several Cabinet ministers, including her sister, Koila Nailatikau, and a number of parliamentarians. Her father was officially reinstated after the coup d'état was quashed, but he chose to step down at that time.

Adi Ateca Ganilau said that her father had resigned and had refused to return because he was upset by the abrogation of the Constitution. "He did not agree with the abrogation of the Constitution. That was probably why he refused to return to office. It was not that the military pressured him to move out," Ganilau said. She called for a thorough investigation into the abrogation of the Constitution, and for those who were legal advisers at the time to be answerable for their actions.

== Opposition to government legislation ==
Ganilau joined her husband and her younger sister, Senator Adi Koila Nailatikau, in opposing the government's controversial Reconciliation, Tolerance, and Unity Bill, which proposed the establishment of a Commission empowered, subject to presidential approval, to compensate victims and pardon perpetrators of the coup d'état of May 2000. Speaking on 25 June 2005, Ganilau said that the Mara family had not been consulted about the legislation, was opposed to it, and would accept no compensation offered by the commission to be established.

Ganilau said that her family was still reeling from the effects of the coup. She thought it "ridiculous" that the government was trying to "excuse people involved in the coup", even after the Fiji Week reconciliation ceremonies that ran from 4 to 11 October 2004, which she called a "failed presentation." She said that it was "not on." She called it "a forced idea" and questioned the government's motives for promoting it. "If the move to reconcile and compensate came from the coup perpetrators maybe, I would have given it some thought but coming from the Government is hard to accept," she stated.

Ganilau said she was opposed to granting amnesty to people implicated in coup-related charges. "It would set a dangerous precedent, that is why I am not condoning it," she declared.

In a further statement on 25 July, Ganilau said that the 2000 coup had not been spontaneous, but a premeditated and carefully planned act, which she accused some members of the present Senate of knowing about in advance.

== Biography controversy ==
The Fiji Times quoted Ganilau on 8 January 2006 as criticizing the Qarase government for supporting the writing of an independent biography of the life of her father, while working to release from prison the very people who had deposed him. This was contradictory, she said. "On one hand they want to praise him but on the other they are working to free those people who ousted him through the Reconciliation Bill." She reiterated her previously stated opposition to the release of coup-convicts, saying that if alive, her father would have preferred justice to take its course.

== Lau Provincial Council controversy ==
Ganilau was elected Chairperson of the Lau Provincial Council's on 11 July 2011, succeeding her brother, Roko Tevita Uluilakeba Mara. She defeated Filipe Bole by 17 votes to 15. She was removed by the military regime the next day for being unwilling to work with the government, and Bole was re-imposed as chair. Following the sacking, the military regime announced that in future it would appoint provincial council chairs.
