= Joseph Browne (civil servant) =

Fijian civil servant

Joseph Browne (born April 14, 1948) is a Fijian civil servant, who was Official Secretary to the late President, Ratu Sir Kamisese Mara, prior to Mara's possibly forced resignation during the insurrection which deposed the constitutional government in 2000. He had first been employed by Mara in 1985 when the latter was still Prime Minister, and had remained with him through the various offices he held, including the Vice-Presidency and Presidency. He is now the head of the Immigration Department.

Browne has denied claims that he participated in planning or executing Mara's resignation. On 29 May 2000, Mara was evacuated to the RFNS Kiro, ostensibly for his own protection following orchestrated threats to himself and his family. This followed a report from the Director of the Police Special Branch, Berenado Daveta, based on intelligence gathered from an undercover agent working among the insurrectionists. Browne has said that he agreed to the President's evacuation because he was suspicious of troop movements at Government House.

The following day, a group including Browne, military commander Commodore Frank Bainimarama, Great Council of Chiefs Chairman and former Prime Minister Sitiveni Rabuka, Police Commissioner Colonel Isikia Savua, and Mara's son-in-law, Ratu Epeli Ganilau, a former military commander, visited Mara aboard the vessel, presented a tabua (whale's tooth) in a formal apology, and asked him to abrogate the Constitution. Mara refused, and resigned. It is not clear to what extent the members of the delegation all knew why they were there. Mara was convinced that Rabuka and Savua had conspired against him, while Ganilau has said that he stayed on "as a witness." Browne has emphatically denied any prior knowledge of the purpose of the visit to the warship, but told Fiji News on 30 April 2001 that he understood why Mara might have suspected his loyalty. The previous day, Mara had told Fiji Television that he had no idea why Browne had asked him to agree to be evacuated.

Browne spoke out against military participation in Mara's funeral, which spanned three days (28–30 April 2004), saying that it was "the height of hypocrisy" to have military officers, who had unceremoniously deposed the President from office, honouring him at his funeral.

Browne also expressed scepticism about the doctrine of necessity pleaded by the officers as their justification for asking Mara to resign, saying that only a court of law could validate the Doctrine of Necessity. He has revealed that in a letter he wrote to Ratu Mara after the appointment of Ratu Josefa Iloilo as his successor, he said that his removal from office had been "treasonous."

Browne has said that he has had his reputation battered and his integrity questioned by claims that he was a party to a coup against the late President.

Browne is from Somosomo village, Taveuni. He is the son of Adi Losalini Browne, a sister of the late President and Tui Cakau - Ratu Sir Penaia Ganilau.
