= 2024 Fijian presidential election =

Election of Ratu Naiqama Lalabalavu

- 31 October 2024

55 members of the Parliament of Fiji 28 votes needed to win
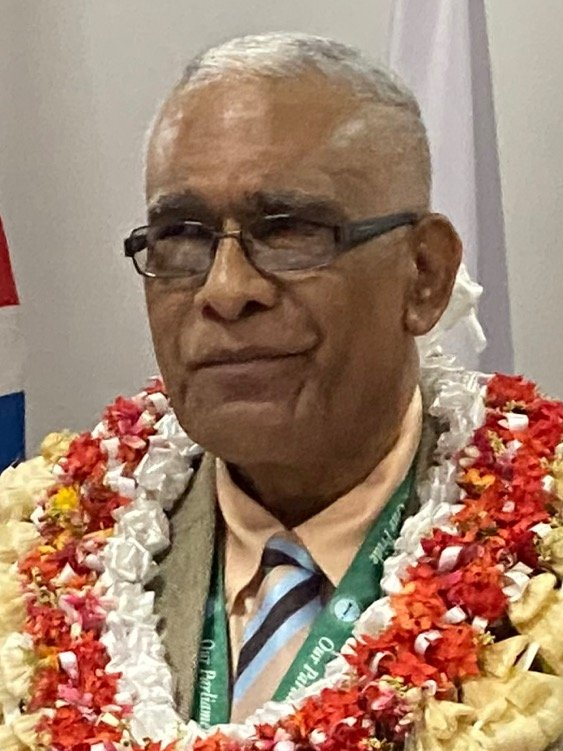
Nominee	Ratu Naiqama Lalabalavu	Ratu Meli Tavaiqia Tora
Party	People's Alliance	Independent
Electoral vote	37	16
Percentage	69.81%	30.19%
President before election
Ratu Wiliame Katonivere
People's Alliance
Elected President
Ratu Naiqama Lalabalavu
People's Alliance

An indirect election was held in Fiji on 31 October 2024, in which members of parliament elected the president. Incumbent Speaker of the Parliament of Fiji Ratu Naiqama Lalabalavu was nominated by Prime Minister Sitiveni Rabuka following the withdrawal of the previous nominee, President Ratu Wiliame Katonivere.

Lalabalavu won the election with 37 votes, defeating the opposition nominee, Ratu Meli Tavaiqia, who received 16 votes. Lalabalavu was officially sworn in as the 7th President of Fiji on 12 November 2024.

== Background ==
As per the country's 2013 constitution, the President is appointed by the Parliament of Fiji with both the Prime Minister and the Leader of the Opposition nominating one name each to the Speaker. To be nominated, candidates must hold only a Fijian citizenship and is not a member or holds any office in any political party. Incumbent President Ratu Wiliame Katonivere who took office in 2021 was expected to secure his second term in office. His nomination was confirmed by Prime Minister Sitiveni Rabuka, who leads a coalition government. Parliament was scheduled to appoint the President on 3 October, however it was postponed to the end of the month due to concerns regarding the presidential nomination.

On 17 October, Prime Minister Rabuka confirmed that the Coalition government's nominee remained President Katonivere. Rabuka had earlier expressed discomfort with certain nominees, leading him to withdraw his initial nomination. In an interview with Fiji Village, Prime Minister Rabuka mentioned that Speaker Lalabalavu had doubts in regards to allegations raised against President Katonivere. Ultimately, those allegations were dismissed by the Fiji Independent Commission Against Corruption (FICAC). FICAC had verified the assets and liabilities declared and concluded that there was no evidence to support the claims.

However on 23 October, President Katonivere formally withdrew his name from nomination. Prime Minister Rabuka later clarified that he did not ask President Katonivere to reject his nomination, but had pointed out facts about a complaint that could potentially lead to criminal investigations to protect the President's integrity. Rabuka then consulted his People's Alliance party and nominated incumbent Speaker Ratu Naiqama Lalabalavu, while the Leader of Opposition Inia Seruiratu nominated the Chair of the Ba Provincial Council, Ratu Meli Tavaiqia. Ro Teimumu Kepa who had previously contended for President in 2021 against Katonivere, confirmed earlier in February 2024 that she would not be seeking the presidency. Instead, she expressed her full support for incumbent President Katonivere.

The National Federation Party and SODELPA (coalition partners of the People's Alliance) supported Speaker Lalabalavu's nomination. The Opposition Group of 9 also supported the nomination. However, former Prime Minister Mahendra Chaudhry voiced strong opposition, arguing that Lalabalavu’s record and close ties to Prime Minister Rabuka’s home province of Cakaudrove made him unsuitable. The country's women rights group in statement said Speaker Lalabalavu is unfit to be President citing his history of misogynistic remarks, including a past suspension from Parliament for derogatory comments directed at former Speaker Jiko Luveni.

== Results ==
On 31 October, the coalition government's nominee and incumbent speaker Ratu Naiqama Lalabalavu was elected President of Fiji. The election took place during a roll call in Parliament, presided over by Deputy Speaker Lenora Qereqeretabua. Lalabalavu received 37 votes with support from all members of the People's Alliance, NFP and SODELPA, including the Opposition Group of 9. The Opposition's nominee Ratu Meli Tavaiqia got only 16 votes.

Candidate	Party	Votes	%
Ratu Naiqama Lalabalavu	People's Alliance	37	69.81
Ratu Meli Tavaiqia	Independent	16	30.19
Total		53	100.00
Valid votes		53	100.00
Invalid/blank votes		0	0.00
Total votes		53	100.00
Registered voters/turnout		53	100.00
Source: Fiji Village

Lalabalavu remained Speaker until he was officially sworn into office of President on 12 November 2024. That same day, in a special parliamentary sitting, former Judge Filimone Jitoko was elected as Speaker, succeeding Lalabalavu in that role.
