= Constitution of Fiji =

Supreme law of Fiji

The Constitution of Fiji is the supreme law of Fiji. There have been four Constitutions since the first was adopted in 1970. The first constitution, adopted in 1970 upon independence, was abrogated following two military coups in 1987. A second constitution, the Constitution of the Sovereign Democratic Republic of Fiji, was adopted in 1990. Its discriminatory provisions, which reserved the office of Prime Minister and a built-in majority in the House of Representatives for indigenous Fijians (although they were at that time a minority of the population) proved very unpopular with the Indo-Fijian community, which comprised almost half the country's population, and in the mid 1990s the government agreed that it should be rewritten. The third constitution, The Constitution of the Republic of the Fiji Islands dates from 1997. The current constitution was implemented in 2013.

== Background ==
Fiji's first constitution, implemented in 1970 at the time of independence from the UK, contained negotiated provisions to enshrine the political supremacy of the minority indigenous population. When an Indo-Fijian dominated government was elected despite these safeguards, the 1987 Fijian coups d'état took place, resulting in even tighter measures in the 1990 constitution.

Widespread Indo-Fijian dissent, coupled with a population shift back to an indigenous majority, prompted a more inclusive approach in the 1997 constitution. This was followed by the election of the first Indo-Fijian Prime Minister, and the violent, failed civilian coup of 2000. The 2013 constitution gave Indo-Fijians equal status in the country.

== 1970 Constitution ==
The 1970 Constitution went into effect 9 October 1970, signaling Fiji's independence from Britain (though it remained a member of the Commonwealth).

The Constitution set up a House of Representatives requiring 22 seats to represent voters registered as Fijian, 22 to those registered as Indian, and 8 to voters registered as neither.

There was a 1977 Fijian constitutional crisis, after the 1977 elections, which prevented a smooth transfer of power.

In 1987, Timoci Bavadra became Prime Minister and formed a cabinet which included a majority of Indian cabinet members. Prior cabinets had always had a small number of Indian cabinet members. The Fijian Army raided the House of Representatives, arrested several cabinet members and the Prime Minister, the first of two 1987 Fijian coups d'état, and the 1970 Constitution was suspended.

== 1990 Constitution ==
The Constitution of the Sovereign Democratic Republic of Fiji, was adopted in 1990 which changed the proportion of representation in parliament with 37 Fijian members, 27 Indian members, 5 general voters, and one representative for the island of Rotuma. It was set up as an interim document, with a review scheduled in 7 years.

== 1997 Constitution ==
Fiji's third constitution was called the Constitution of the Republic of the Fiji Islands and was the supreme law of Fiji from its adoption in 1997 until 2009. It was also suspended for a period following the 2000 coup d'état.

=== Constitutional process ===
In 1995, a three member Fiji Constitution Review Commission was appointed. Their report was presented to the President Ratu Sir Kamisese Mara on 6 September 1996. The report was subsequently tabled in Parliament, at a joint sitting of the Senate and the House of Representatives, on 11 September. A parliamentary committee, composed of members of both chambers, was established to study the report.

Eight months later, the committee tabled its response in Parliament on 14 May 1997, endorsing most of the recommendations. The Great Council of Chiefs, a powerful gathering of mainly high chiefs which, among other prerogatives, elects the President of Fiji, also endorsed the report in June. The Constitution (Amendment) Bill 1997 was passed by the House of Representatives on 3 July that year, and by the Senate on 10 July. President Mara signed it into law on 25 July 1997. It took effect from 27 July.

Under its provisions, ethnic Fijians agreed to give up their guaranteed majority in the House of Representatives and their monopoly on the Prime Minister's office, but in return, their ownership of most of the land was written into the constitution. Their rights were also protected by institutionalising of the Great Council of Chiefs, which retained its power to elect the President and 14 of the 32 Senators.

The 1997 constitution was only the second national constitution to explicitly protect against discrimination based on sexual orientation (section 38). The first one was South Africa's in 1996.

=== 2000 and 2006 coups, 2009 abrogation ===
The 1997 constitution was abrogated by Commodore Frank Bainimarama, who organised a counter-coup to neutralise a civilian coup d'état led by George Speight, and subsequently formed an Interim Military Government. In March 2001 the Court of Appeal of Fiji reinstated the constitution in Republic of Fiji Islands v Prasad, and new parliamentary elections under it were held in September 2001.

On 5 December 2006, the Military again overthrew the government. Commodore Bainimarama, who once again became acting Head of State, stated that the Constitution would remain in effect, but said on 17 December that "as a last resort", it could be abrogated if no other way could be found to ensure immunity from prosecution for soldiers involved in the takeover.

In the April 2009 crisis, President Josefa Iloilo suspended the Constitution and dismissed all judges after the Court of Appeal ruled the military government from 2006 illegal.

=== Amendments ===
At the end of September 2005, the government introduced legislation to amend the Constitution so as to allow parliamentarians and other senior government officials to serve as members of Provincial Councils, the Fijian Affairs Board, or the Great Council of Chiefs. Prime Minister Laisenia Qarase told the House of Representatives that the amendments, to which the Opposition Fiji Labour Party had agreed at the Tanaloa Talks in 2003, were necessary to allow chiefs to hold multiple positions if their subjects so wished.

In 2005, several prominent figures were affected by the constitutional ban on politicians holding other public offices. These included Ro Teimumu Kepa, the Paramount Chief of the Burebasaga Confederacy, who was required to relinquish her chairmanship of the Rewa Provincial Council, which was deemed to be incompatible with her position as a member of the House of Representatives and as a Cabinet Minister.

Even though the Labour Party agreed to the amendments in 2003, it has indicated that it will oppose them now. The FLP is bitterly opposed to other government legislation, such as the Reconciliation, Tolerance, and Unity Bill which may be passed with a simple majority, and it is thought that its stated intention to oppose these amendments, which require a two-thirds majority in both houses, may be a ploy to force the government to negotiate on the Unity Bill.

== New Constitution for 2013 ==
In July 2009, following the suspension of the Constitution in April, interim Prime Minister Voreqe Bainimarama announced that Fiji would have a new Constitution—its fourth—by 2013. It would remove the ethnic-based provisions of the electoral system. The voting age would be lowered to 18, and the number of seats in Parliament, as well as the "need for a Senate", would be reviewed during the preparatory phase. The new Constitution would derive from the People's Charter for Change, Peace and Progress, and from "extensive" consultations with political parties, non-governmental organisations and ordinary citizens.

== Proposed ==
In 2026, there is a proposed constitutional change that included re-introducing references to God and Christianity in the preamble.

== See also ==
- People's Charter for Change, Peace and Progress
