= Politics of Fiji =

- Polity type: Parliamentary Representative Democratic Republic
- Constitution: Constitution of Fiji

Legislative branch
- Name: Parliament of Fiji
- Type: Unicameral
- Presiding officer: Filimone Jitoko, Honorable Speaker

Executive branch
- Head of state
- Title: President
- Currently: Naiqama Lalabalavu
- Appointer: Parliament
- Head of government
- Title: Prime Minister
- Currently: Sitiveni Rabuka
- Appointer: President
- Cabinet
- Name: Cabinet of Fiji
- Current cabinet: Cabinet of Sitiveni Rabuka
- Leader: Prime Minister

Judicial branch
- Courts: The Supreme Court, The High Court, Court of Appeal, and The Magistrates Court

The politics of Fiji take place with the framework of a parliamentary representative democratic republic. Fiji has a multiparty system with the Prime Minister of Fiji as head of government. The executive power is exercised by the government. Legislative power is vested in both the government and the Parliament of Fiji. The judiciary is mostly independent of the executive and the legislature.

Following the 2006 Fijian coup d'état, the power was subsumed by the military. Nominal head of state Ratu Josefa Iloilo abolished the Constitution of Fiji and dismissed all Courts, after the Court of Appeal ruled that the post-coup Bainimarama government was illegal. A new Constitution was made known to the public in September 2013, and a general election was held in September 2014, won by Bainimarama's FijiFirst Party.

The Economist Intelligence Unit rated Fiji as a "hybrid regime" in 2018.

Fiji politics has historically, preceding British colonization, been characterized by a powerful role for chieftains. There have been several coups in Fiji's post-independent history. Fiji politics has heavily shaped by Ratu Sir Kamisese Mara, who was chief minister in the colonial government since 1966 and later served in post-independent Fiji as Prime Minister and President.

== Constitutional structure ==
=== Executive branch ===
Main office-holders
Office	Name	Party	Since
President	Naiqama Lalabalavu	People's Alliance	12 November 2024
Prime Minister	Sitiveni Rabuka	People’s Alliance	24 December 2022

Fiji's Head of State is the president. He is elected by Parliament of Fiji after nomination by the prime minister or the Leader of the Opposition, for a three-year term. Although his role is largely an honorary one, modelled after that of the British Monarchy, the president has certain "reserve powers" that may be used in the event of a national crisis. In practice, attempts by the president to assert the reserve powers have proved problematic. In 2000, in the midst of a civilian coup d'État against the elected government, President Ratu Sir Kamisese Mara announced on 27 May that he was assuming executive authority, but was evidently forced to resign two days later by the military commander, Commodore Frank Bainimarama.

The president is also the Commander-in-Chief of the Armed Forces.

Actual executive power is in the hands of the cabinet, presided over by the prime minister. The prime minister is elected by Parliament, under the 2013 Constitution of Fiji.

Under the former constitution, which was abrogated at the behest of the military-backed interim government in 2009, the prime minister was formally appointed by the president, but had to be acceptable to a majority of the House of Representatives. In practice, this usually reduced the president's role to little more than a formality, with the position automatically going to the leader of the political party or coalition that controlled a majority of seats.

There were times, however, when there was no clear majority in the House of Representatives. The parliamentary election of 1992 was inconclusive, and the position of the largest party, the Soqosoqo ni Vakavulewa ni Taukei, was further undermined by subsequent defections. On such occasions, the president had to take on the role of an arbitrator. After consulting with all the parliamentary factions, he would appoint as prime minister the person he judged to be the most acceptable to the majority in the House of Representatives. If no such person could be found, the president was required to order a new election.

Another situation requiring presidential intervention arose following the 1999 election. The People's Coalition won a landslide victory; with the largest party in the coalition, the Fiji Labour Party, winning a majority in its own right. Some of the smaller parties in the coalition expressed unease at the prospect of Mahendra Chaudhry, the Labour Party leader and an Indo-Fijian, becoming prime minister, saying that he would be unacceptable to indigenous Fijian voters that they represented. President Mara, however, persuaded them to accept Chaudhry as prime minister.

The cabinet, consisting of around 10 to 25 ministers, is formally appointed by the president on the nomination of the prime minister.

According to the former 1997 constitution, the cabinet was supposed to reflect the political composition of the House of Representatives, with every party holding more than 8 seats in the House entitled to proportionate representation in the cabinet. In practice, this rule was never strictly implemented. In 1999, Chaudhry refused to give Ministerial posts to the Soqosoqo ni Vakavulewa ni Taukei (SVT), saying that its demands were unacceptable. From 2001 to 2004, Prime Minister Laisenia Qarase, whose coalition dominated by his Soqosoqo Duavata ni Lewenivanua had narrowly won the 2001 election, refused to include the Fiji Labour Party in his cabinet, and avoided implementing several subsequent Supreme Court verdicts ordering him to do so by appealing each successive verdict, until the Labour Party announced late in 2004 that it was no longer interested in joining the cabinet. Under the 2013 Constitution, the Cabinet is no longer required to reflect the political composition of Parliament.

The FijiFirst party, led by Prime Minister Frank Bainimarama, won outright majority in the country’s 51-seat parliament both in 2014 election and narrowly in 2018 election. In October 2021, Tui Macuata Ratu Wiliame Katonivere was elected the new president of Fiji by the parliament.

On 24 December 2022, Sitiveni Rabuka, the head of the People’s Alliance (PAP), became Fiji’s 12th prime minister, succeeding Bainimarama, following the December 2022 general election.

=== Legislative branch ===
Under the 2013 Constitution, Fiji's Parliament is unicameral. Its 50 members are elected for four-year terms by Party-list proportional representation, with the entire country voting as a single constituency. To win election to Parliament, a political party (or an independent candidate) must win five percent of the total valid vote nationwide. Fiji's system differs from that of many other countries using the party-list system, however, in that voters do not vote for a party, as such, but for an individual candidate. Each voter is allowed to vote for only one candidate. The votes for all candidates on a party ticket are pooled, their aggregate as a percentage of the total valid vote (minus votes cast for parties falling short of the five-percent threshold) determining the number of seats in Parliament to which their party is entitled. The eligible number of candidates from a political party are elected in the order of the number of votes they received individually. In the 2014 elections, for example, the FijiFirst Party polled 59.2 percent of the valid vote. When votes for small parties polling less than the five-percent threshold were excluded, this entitled FijiFirst to 32 of the 50 seats. These were filled by the 32 FijiFirst candidates who polled the highest number of votes as individuals.

Before the adoption of the 2013 Constitution, Fiji's Parliament consisted of two houses. The more powerful of the two chambers, the House of Representatives, had 71 members, elected for five-year terms. 25 were elected by universal suffrage. The remaining 46 were reserved for Fiji's ethnic communities and were elected from communal electoral rolls: 23 Fijians, 19 Indo-Fijians, 1 Rotuman, and 3 "general electors" (Europeans, Chinese, and other minorities). The House chose a Speaker, who was not allowed to be a present member of the House.

The "upper chamber", the Senate, was primarily a house of review: it could not initiate legislation, but could amend or reject it. The 32 senators were formally appointed by the president on the nomination of the Great Council of Chiefs (14), the prime minister (9), the Leader of the Opposition (8), and the Council of Rotuma (1). Senators as well as Representatives could serve as cabinet Ministers.

When the Parliament was bicameral, the attorney-general, Fiji's top legal official who sits in the cabinet, was the only member of Parliament permitted to attend sessions of both chambers. The attorney-general had voting rights only in the chamber they were elected or appointed to and authorised to attend and participate in debates in the other chamber.

=== Judicial branch ===
Fiji maintains an independent judiciary, with judicial power vested in three courts (the High Court, Court of Appeal, and Supreme Court) established by the Constitution, which also makes provision for other courts to be set up by Parliament; Magistrates' Courts have accordingly been set up. The High Court and the Supreme Court are both presided over by the Chief Justice (currently Kamal Kumar); the Chief Justice is barred, however, from membership of the Court of Appeal, which comprises three judges. The Appeal Court, which did not exist prior to the 1997 Constitution, has the power "to hear and determine appeals" from judgements of the High Court; decisions of this court may be further appealed to the Supreme Court, whose decision is final. The judiciary managed to maintain its independence from political control in the aftermath of the coups of 1987. Following the 2000 coup, however, its integrity was compromised, in the eye of many, when three judges (including Daniel Fatiaki, who later became Chief Justice) advised then-President Ratu Sir Kamisese Mara to abrogate the constitution. Mara refused and resigned; a military administration replaced him. Then Chief Justice recognised the military government, triggering widespread disappointment to those who had seen the judiciary as a model of independence. On 15 November 2000, however, the High Court forced the reinstatement of the 1997 Constitution, which had been abrogated in June following the forced resignation of President Ratu Sir Kamisese Mara on 29 May.

Following the military coup of 2006, the Military dismissed Chief Justice Daniel Fatiaki and appointed the more pliable Anthony Gates in his place. Following a Court of Appeal decision in 2009 that the Military-backed interim government was illegal, President Ratu Josefa Iloilo abrogated the constitution, dismissed all judges, and reappointed the interim government. Some judges were subsequently reappointed and some were not.

=== Local government ===
There are four administrative divisions (Central, Eastern, Northern and Western), each under the charge of a commissioner appointed by the central government. The divisions are further subdivided into fourteen provinces, each of which has a provincial council. In addition, the island of Rotuma has the status of a dependency, and enjoys a degree of internal autonomy, with its own island council.

Ethnic Fijians have their own administration in which councils preside over a hierarchy of provinces, districts, and villages. The councils deal with all matters affecting ethnic Fijians. The 55‑member Great Council of Chiefs (Bose Levu Vakaturaga in Fijian) included 3 representatives from each of Fiji's 14 provinces and 1 dependency, 3 ex-officio members (the President, Vice-President, and Prime Minister), and 6 government appointees; former prime minister Sitiveni Rabuka was a life-member. The Great Council of Chiefs advised the government, and also functioned as an electoral college to appoint the president of the republic, as well as 14 of the 32 Senators. This prerogative of the Council was delegated to the 14 provincial councils, each choosing one senator. It was a constitutional oddity that even though Fiji became a Republic in 1987, Queen Elizabeth II was by the Great Council of Chiefs as the Tui Viti, the Paramount Chief, until 2012, when the council was disestablished.

Suva, Lautoka, and nine other towns have municipal governments, with city or town councils, each chaired by a mayor. These are responsible for the local affairs of all citizens, and are elected by universal suffrage.

== Contentious issues ==
Most of Fiji's political controversies are related to the ethnic fault line that characterises Fijian politics. Fiji's former constitution imposed disabilities on a group that constitutes a large part of the population on the pretended basis of race. It has caused an exodus of the Indians, who until the late 1980s formed a slight majority in Fiji.

=== Land tenure ===
One of the main issues that has fuelled the contention over the years is land tenure. Indigenous Fijian communities very closely identify themselves with their land. In 1909 near the peak of the inflow of indentured Indian labourers, the land ownership pattern was frozen and further sales prohibited. Today over 80% of the land is held by indigenous Fijians, under the collective ownership of the traditional Fijian clans. Indo-Fijians produce over 90% of the sugar crop but must lease the land they work from its ethnic Fijian owners instead of being able to buy it outright. The leases have been generally for 10 years, although they are usually renewed for two 10‑year extensions. Many Indo-Fijians argue that these terms do not provide them with adequate security and have pressed for renewable 30‑year leases, while many ethnic Fijians fear that an Indo-Fijian government would erode their control over the land.

The Indo-Fijian parties' major voting bloc is made up of sugarcane farmers. The farmers' main tool of influence has been their ability to galvanise widespread boycotts of the sugar industry, thereby crippling the economy.

=== Citizenship and residency issues ===
Multiple citizenship, previously prohibited under the 1997 constitution (abrogated April 2009), has been permitted since the April 2009 Citizenship Decree and established as a right under Section 5(4) of the September 2013 Constitution.
