= 2021 Fijian presidential election =

Election of Wiliame Katonivere

- 22 October 2021

51 members of the Parliament of Fiji 26 votes needed to win
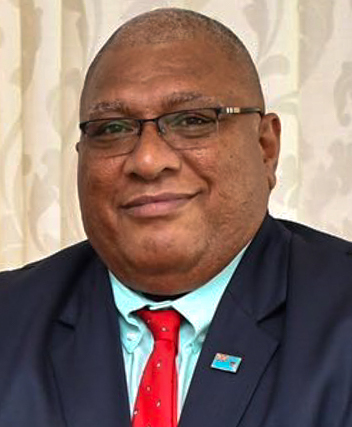

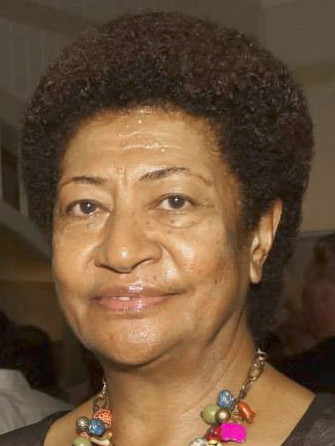
Nominee	Wiliame Katonivere	Teimumu Kepa
Party	FijiFirst	SODELPA
Electoral vote	28	23
Percentage	54.90%	45.10%
President before election
Jioji Konrote
FijiFirst
Elected President
Wiliame Katonivere
FijiFirst

Indirect presidential elections were held in Fiji on 22 October 2021, in which members of parliament elected the president.

Wiliame Katonivere was nominated as the FijiFirst government's candidate by Prime Minister Frank Bainimarama, while Teimumu Kepa was nominated by Opposition Whip Lynda Tabuya. Katonivere was able to gain the support of a majority of MPs in the first round of voting, defeating Kepa by 28 votes to 23. An opposition MP, Mosese Bulitavu of SODELPA, also voted for Katonivere.

Two former prime ministers weighed in on the appointment; Mahendra Chaudhry called on the nominees to be disqualified, citing Section 83 (1) (c) of the 2013 constitution, which requires that the holder of the office not be affiliated with any political party as Katonivere was the incumbent president of FijiFirst party, and Kepa was a member of SODELPA. Meanwhile Sitiveni Rabuka praised Katonivere's appointment, adding that it showed that the people still have respect for the chiefly system of Fiji.

== Results ==
Candidate	Party	Votes	%
Wiliame Katonivere	FijiFirst	28	54.90
Teimumu Kepa	Social Democratic Liberal Party	23	45.10
Total		51	100.00
Valid votes		51	100.00
Invalid/blank votes		0	0.00
Total votes		51	100.00
Registered voters/turnout		51	100.00
Source: The Fiji Times
