= Fijian Association Party =

Political party in Fiji

The Fijian Association Party (FAP) was a political party in Fiji. It played a significant role in Fijian politics throughout the 1990s but lost all of its seats in the House of Representatives in the parliamentary election of 2001.

The FAP was founded in 1994 by Josefata Kamikamica, head of the Native Land Trust Board and a former Minister of Finance. Following the parliamentary election of 1992, Kamikamica and five of his supporters had left the Soqosoqo ni Vakavulewa ni Taukei of Sitiveni Rabuka and unsuccessfully challenged him for the Prime Ministership, attempting to build a coalition government with the Indo-Fijian opposition. The party won five seats in the general election of 1994, which was called three years early because of political instability. Following Kamikamica's death from cancer in 1996, Ratu Finau Mara (the son of then-President Ratu Sir Kamisese Mara) took over the leadership. In 1998, he was replaced by Adi Kuini Speed, the widow of former Fiji Labour Party (FLP) Prime Minister Timoci Bavadra, who had been deposed in a coup led by Rabuka, then a lieutenant colonel in the army, in 1987. Speed joined the FAP in 1995 after falling out with her late husband's party over the direction in which Mahendra Chaudhry, the new leader, was taking it.

In the parliamentary election of 1999, the FAP joined with Chaudhry's FLP as part of the People's Coalition, an electoral alliance which also included a number of smaller parties. The FLP, supported mostly by Indo-Fijians, sought partnerships with parties led by ethnic Fijians in order to broaden its support base. The FAP won ten seats in the 71-member House of Representatives, its best result ever. The FAP initially proposed Speed for Prime Minister, saying that she would be more acceptable to indigenous Fijians than Chaudhry. President Mara, however, persuaded her to accept Chaudhry as Prime Minister, pointing out that the FLP had won a majority - 37 seats - in its own right. Towards the end of 1999, Speed survived a challenge to her leadership of the FAP in a divisive High Court case, which resulted in backbencher Ratu Tu'uakitau Cokanauto and his supporters splitting from the party.

The government of which the FAP was a part was deposed in the Fiji coup of 2000, instigated by George Speight. An election to restore democracy was held in 2001, but by this time many of its members had left to join the new Soqosoqo Duavata ni Lewenivanua of Laisenia Qarase. The FAP contested only 15 seats, on a platform of alleviating poverty through income-generating projects, reducing health costs and increasing education assistance for poor families, promoting indigenous Fijian culture, and increasing the participation rate of women at all levels of decision making. The party also attempted to make inroads into the Indo-Fijian electorate, accusing the United Fiji Party of promoting racism. The electorate was polarized to an extent not seen for more than a decade, however, with ethnic Fijians rallying behind the Soqosoqo Duavata ni Lewenivanua and its ally, the Conservative Alliance, and Indo-Fijians behind the FLP. All FAP candidates, including Speed, were defeated.

In June 2002, most members of the FAP joined with three other parties, including its former rival, the Soqosoqo ni Vakavulewa ni Taukei, to form the Fiji Democratic Party under the leadership of Filipe Bole. In April 2005, this party dissolved itself in order to merge with the newly formed National Alliance Party of Fiji, founded by Ratu Epeli Ganilau. A rump of the FAP continued for some time, under the leadership of Ratu Inoke Seru.
