= Suva City Urban (Fijian Communal Constituency, Fiji) =

Former electoral constituency in Fiji

Suva City Fijian Urban Communal is a former electoral division of Fiji, one of 23 communal constituencies reserved for indigenous Fijians. Established by the 1997 Constitution, it came into being in 1999 and was used for the parliamentary elections of 1999, 2001, and 2006. (Of the remaining 48 seats, 23 were reserved for other ethnic communities and 25, called Open Constituencies, were elected by universal suffrage). The electorate covered the central part of Suva City.

The 2013 Constitution promulgated by the Military-backed interim government abolished all constituencies and established a form of proportional representation, with the entire country voting as a single electorate.

== Election results ==
In the following tables, the primary vote refers to first-preference votes cast. The final vote refers to the final tally after votes for low-polling candidates have been progressively redistributed to other candidates according to pre-arranged electoral agreements (see electoral fusion), which may be customized by the voters (see instant run-off voting).

In the 2001 and 2006 elections, Mataiasi Ragiagia won with more than 50 percent of the primary vote; therefore, there was no redistribution of preferences.

=== 1999 ===
Candidate	Party	First preferences		Final preferences	
Candidate	Party	Votes	%	Votes	%
Viliame Volavola	FAP	1,408	15.32	5,311	57.78
Filipe Bole	SVT	3,700	40.26	3,880	42.22
Lili King	VLV	2,131	23.19		
Susana Tuisawau	FLP	1,170	12.73		
Josaia Waqabaca	NVTLP	782	8.51		
Total		9,191	100.00	9,191	100.00
Registered voters/turnout		9,191	–		
FAP win					

=== 2001 ===
Candidate	Party	Votes	%
Mataiasi Ragigia	SDL	4,874	55.75
Filipe Bole	SVT	1,586	18.14
Seini Nawalowalo	NLUP	1,108	12.67
Aca Soqosoqo	CAMV	911	10.42
Apaitia Seru	NVTLP	126	1.44
Sereana Lewanirabe	DNT	77	0.88
Atama Matauloki	Independent	60	0.69
Total		8,742	100.00
Registered voters/turnout		8,742	–
SDL gain from FAP			

=== 2006 ===
Candidate	Party	Votes	%
Mataiasi Ragigia	SDL	7,205	73.04
Peni Volavola	SDL	880	8.92
Apete Naitini	NAP	760	7.70
Josaia Waqabaca	FLP	675	6.84
Miriama Cama	NFP	157	1.59
Akuila Bale	Independent	142	1.44
Semi Uluivuya	NAVTLP	46	0.47
Total		9,865	100.00
Registered voters/turnout		9,865	–
SDL hold			

== Sources ==
- Psephos - Adam Carr's electoral archive
- Fiji Facts
