= Josaia Waqabaca =

Fijian political organizer

Josaia Waqabaca (pronounced [tʃoˈsaja βaŋɡamˈbaða]) is a Fijian public figure and former political organizer, who turned police informant about the Fiji coup of 2000. Waqabaca was convicted and imprisoned in 2001 for plotting to kidnap the Military Commander, Commodore Frank Bainimarama, in 2000.

A former official of the Nationalist Vanua Tako Lavo Party (NVTLP), Waqabaca claims to have been hired by two businessmen, at the behest of the party, to help bomb Nadi International Airport and strategic positions in Suva after the People's Coalition had come to power in the general election of 1999, and to have initially participated in, before withdrawing from, the campaign of unrest that led to the coup d'état which deposed the Chaudhry government in May 2000. He supported similar allegations made by coup-convict Maciu Navakasuasua.

In an interview with the Fiji Sun, published on 22 December 2005, Waqabaca said that a religious conversion experience had led him to confess his role in the 2000 coup.

The Fiji Sun reported on 6 March 2006 that Waqabaca had applied for the Fiji Labour Party (FLP) nomination for the Suva City Fijian Communal Constituency for the upcoming parliamentary election, due on 6–13 May 2006. He described the ethnic politics to which he had once subscribed as "suicidal" and that dialogue with other ethnic leaders was the only way forward. He went on to contest the seat, receiving 675 votes, or 6.84 percent of the 9,865 votes cast. He thus became one of a mere handful of FLP candidates to poll more than five percent in a Fijian communal constituency.

The Fiji Sun quoted Waqabaca on 16 March as saying that in late February, he had been confronted by Cabinet Minister Ted Young and rebuked for not joining the ruling Soqosoqo Duavata ni Lewenivanua (SDL), and later by the businessmen who had planned the bombing of Nadi airport, who had forced him to sign a denial of his earlier media plans. He had signed the denial only out of fear for his life, he emphasized.
