= Tevita Mara =

Fijian chief

Ratu Tevita Kapaiwai Lutunauga Uluilakeba Mara is a Fijian career soldier.

== Biography ==
He held the rank of Lieutenant Colonel as of early 2006. On 3 February, he was named Army Chief of Staff, succeeding Colonel Meli Saubulinayau, who was a close relative of his. This position is the fourth highest in the Fijian Military, behind that of the Military Commander (Commodore Frank Bainimarama), Deputy Commander and Chief of Staff RFMF (Captain Esala Teleni) and the Land Force Commander (Lieutenant Colonel Pita Driti). Mara held the position for several months, before he was appointed Commanding Officer of the Third Infantry Regiment, a key position in the Fiji Army as he controls the infantry division, that has about 500 gun-carrying soldiers. He attended his staff course at Malaysian Armed Forces Staff College, Haigate, Kuala Lumpur, Malaysia in 2005 (Class 34/2005).

In May 2011 he was charged with mutiny and accused of attempting to overthrow Bainimarima's government. He fled Fiji on 9 May 2011 with the aid of the Royal Tongan Navy, and has been declared a fugitive by the Fijian government under the Extradition Act. Mara released a video on 14 May criticising Bainimarima and the Fijian Attorney-General, Aiyaz Sayed-Khaiyum. He subsequently met with officials in Australia and New Zealand.

Mara is the only surviving son of the late Ratu Sir Kamisese Mara, Fiji's longtime Prime Minister and President. He first joined the Army in 1988. His older brother, Ratu Finau Mara, has also served in the Army. His older sister, Adi Koila Nailatikau is married to the military-appointed President of Fiji, Ratu Epeli Nailatikau. Mara currently serves as an advisor to the King of Tonga, where he enjoys the privileges of a noble in the Pacific island kingdom.

Mara returned to Fiji in March 2023, following the defeat of the Bainimarama regime in the 2022 Fijian general election. He was cleared of charges against him and was endorsed by the Vuanirewa Clan to the title of Tui Nayau, Sau ni Vanua ko Lau, Tui Lau.

In July 2025 he was invested with the titles of Turaga Tui Nayau, Sau Ni Vanua Ko Lau and Tui Lau.

He has only been married once and since divorced.
