= Mataiasi Ragigia =

Fijian politician

Mataiasi Vave Ragigia (died 20 October 2012) was a Fijian politician who served in the now-defunct House of Representatives. He held the Suva City Urban Fijian Communal Constituency, which he won for the ruling Soqosoqo Duavata ni Lewenivanua Party (SDL) in the parliamentary election of September 2001, defeating the incumbent Ratu Viliame Volavola of the Fijian Association Party (FAP).

Ragigia's election came on his second attempt. In the previous election of 1999, he had contested the Suva City Open Constituency for the Soqosoqo ni Vakavulewa ni Taukei, but had lost to Ofa Duncan of the United General Party.

Ragigia retained his seat with over 73 percent of the vote at the Fiji election of 2006. Fiji Village reported on 25 September 2006, however, that his position was in jeopardy as he had been absent from two sittings of the House. Mary Chapman, Parliament's Secretary-General, revealed, however, that Ragigia had written to Parliamentary Speaker Pita Nacuva to explain his absence on mainly medical grounds, and that Nacuva would wait for the report of the next medical examination before making a decision on whether to declare Ragigia's seat vacant. The question was made redundant by the military coup of 5 December 2006.
