= Hari Punja =

Fijian businessman

Hari Punja, OF, OBE (born 1936) is an Indo-Fijian businessman and Chairman of Hari Punja Group of Companies. Hari Punja and Sons Limited is a very diversified (and probably the largest) company in Fiji.

Hari Punja was born in Fiji and received his education in Fiji and Australia. He trained as a chemical engineer. Punja joined the business in 1960. He has served as a mayor of Lautoka and on a number of prestigious boards such as Fiji Broadcasting Commission and Fiji Sugar Corporation. He served as a Senator from 1996 to 1999.

Following the passage of the Media Industry Development Decree 2010 by the military regime, Punja resigned from the board of Fiji Television and sold his stake in radio company Communications Fiji Limited.

== Honors ==
Punja has been bestowed with many credentials and honors. Some of these include:

- Order of the British Empire (OBE)
- Justice of the Peace (JP)
- Order of Fiji: Bestowed by the President of Fiji, Ratu Sir Kaisese Mara
- The Fiji National Millennium Committee recognized Hari Punja as an outstanding contributor in shaping the nation of Fiji during the 20th Century
- He was named as one of the 10 most successful businessmen living outside India in "The Encyclopedia of the Indian Diaspora" (2006) by Professor Dr. Brij Lal (Australian National University)
- Punja was rated the 6th most influential person in the Pacific region through a poll carried out by the Australian-based Pacific Magazine.
