= Resignation of Kamisese Mara =

2000 resignation of the president of Fiji

Fiji's President, Ratu Sir Kamisese Mara resigned under duress on May 29, 2000, and handed power over to Commodore Frank Bainimarama. In what politicians have called a "coup within a coup," Ratu Mara was whisked away on a warship on May 28. "If the Constitution goes, I go," he defiantly declared. A group including Police Commissioner Isikia Savua asked for his resignation.

Chaudhry, for his part, has claimed that Ilisoni Ligairi, Speight's security chief, told him that Savua and former Prime Minister Rabuka were involved in the planning of the coup. "Ligairi can't lie as he was very much involved and is now awaiting trial at Nukulau Island," Chaudhry said.

The military regime that took over appointed Ratu Josefa Iloilo as president. After the coup had been quashed, the High Court ruled on 15 October 2000 that Mara's replacement was unconstitutional and ordered his reinstatement, but Mara decided to spare the country further constitutional trauma by resigning officially, with his resignation retroactive to May 29, 2000.

The Police declared that they were facing many challenges in their investigation, finding many officers uncooperative. Then on 30 April 2004, Police spokesman Mesake Koroi, said that a lot of hearsay and rumours were going around that would not stand up in court. Many witnesses were refusing to talk. "Unfortunately we are hitting a brick wall in our investigations at the moment," Koroi said.

== See also ==
- 2000 Fijian coup d'état

== Bibliography ==
- Trnka, S. (2011). State of Suffering: Political Violence and Community Survival in Fiji. United States: Cornell University Press., ISBN 9780801461880 Read
- Pretes, M. (2008). Coup: Reflections on the Political Crisis in Fiji. United States: ANU E Press., ISBN 9781921536373 Read
- Baba, T., Nabobo-Baba, U., Field, M. (2005). Speight of Violence: Inside Fiji's 2000 Coup. Australia: Pandanus Books., ISBN 9781740761703 Read
