= Tevita Momoedonu =

Fijian politician (1946–2020)

The Right Honourable Ratu Tevita Momoedonu

Prime Minister of Fiji
- In office 14 March 2001 – 16 March 2001; Acting
- President: Ratu Josefa Iloilo
- Preceded by: Laisenia Qarase
- Succeeded by: Laisenia Qarase
- In office 27 May 2000 – 27 May 2000; Several Minutes
- President: Ratu Sir Kamisese Mara
- Preceded by: Mahendra Chaudhry
- Succeeded by: Vacant

Personal details
- Born: Ratu Tevita Momoedonu; 13 January 1946 Lautoka, Fiji
- Died: 26 November 2020 (aged 74) Lautoka, Fiji
- Party: Labour Party; Bei Kai Viti

Ratu Tevita Momoedonu (13 January 1946 – 26 November 2020) was a Fijian politician who served as the fifth Prime Minister of Fiji twice – each time extremely briefly. Both appointments were to get around constitutional technicalities; his first term of office – on 27 May 2000 lasted only a few minutes. His second term – from 14 to 16 March 2001 was for two days. He subsequently served his country as Ambassador of Fiji to Japan. Using his chiefly title of "Taukei Sawaieke", he later led pushed for the Yasana of Ba to secede from the Burebasaga and Kubuna Confederacies to form their own fourth confederacy under the Tui Vuda, Ratu Josefa Iloilo, who died in 2011.

== First appointment ==
In 1999, Momoedonu had been elected on the Fiji Labour Party (FLP) ticket to represent the Vuda Open Constituency in the House of Representatives, and subsequently appointed to the Cabinet. He was the only minister not present in the Parliament building when George Speight stormed the complex on 19 May 2000, taking Chaudhry and other government members hostage and staging a coup d'état. The President, Ratu Sir Kamisese Mara, wanted to assume emergency powers to deal with the situation, but was unable to do so, because constitutionally, the President is not allowed to act except on the advice of the Prime Minister – and Prime Minister Chaudhry, being in captivity, was unable to render such advice. In a move which some legal scholars have questioned as being of doubtful constitutional validity, Mara therefore dismissed Chaudhry and appointed Momoedonu in his place on 27 May, so that Momoedonu could "advise" him to suspend Parliament and assume emergency powers. Upon tendering the requisite advice, Momoedonu promptly resigned. The whole procedure had taken only a few minutes. (The move backfired when, two days later, Mara was himself deposed by the Commander of the Fiji Military Forces, Commodore Frank Bainimarama).

== Interim Minister; second appointment as Prime Minister ==
Momoedonu served as Minister for Labour and Industrial Relations in the interim Cabinet formed by Laisenia Qarase in the midst of the upheaval that followed the coup. He held this position until September 2001.

Momoedonu's second appointment as Prime Minister, on 14 March 2001, came in the wake of an Appeal Court verdict that the interim government of President Josefa Iloilo and Prime Minister Laisenia Qarase, both of whom had taken office when the coup had been put down, was unconstitutional, and ordered that the previous government be reinstated. That would mean reinstating Ratu Mara as president or else convening the Great Council of Chiefs to elect a new president. Mara moved to spare the country further constitutional trauma by resigning officially, retroactive to 29 May 2000 (the day on which he had been deposed), thereby validating the Iloilo regime, which was duly affirmed by the Great Council of Chiefs. The court verdict was also widely interpreted to mean that Mahendra Chaudhry should be reinstated as Prime Minister, but President Iloilo disagreed. He argued that defections from Chaudhry's Labour Party meant that he no longer had majority support in the House of Representatives, and therefore the President was not obliged to appoint him.

Iloilo had apparently decided already that the best way forward for Fiji was to take the question of the country's leadership back to the people, but he could not constitutionally call an early election except on the advice of the Prime Minister – advice that he was sure Chaudhry would refuse to render. He therefore appointed Momoedonu. There was a legal argument, albeit a flimsy one, that as the last "lawfully appointed" Prime Minister under the last constitutional President, Ratu Mara, Momoedonu should be reappointed. Cynics, including former House of Representatives Speaker Tomasi Vakatora, saw the appointment more as a case of nepotism: Momoedonu was President Iloilo's nephew. The appointment, although brief, entitled him to a lifetime pension amounting to 20 percent of the Prime Minister's salary.

Momoedonu rendered his formal advice to President Iloilo to dissolve Parliament and call a general election. Mission accomplished, Momoedonu resigned the next day, allowing Laisenia Qarase to resume the office of Prime Minister. In the ensuing election, Qarase was confirmed as Prime Minister when his newly formed Soqosoqo Duavata ni Lewenivanua won a plurality. Momoedonu, however, stood as a candidate for the House of Representatives on the Bei Kai Viti Party ticket, but was defeated.

== Ambassador to Japan ==
In 2002, Momoedonu was appointed Fiji's Ambassador Extraordinary and Plenipotentiary to Japan, and duly presented his credentials to Emperor Akihito on 7 October that year. His term expired in March 2006, and he returned to Fiji.

== Later career ==
The Fiji Sun reported on 12 March 2006 that Momoedonu was being considered as a possible leader for the Party of National Unity (PANU), which was reestablished in early 2006 following its deregistration the previous year, and which absorbed the People's National Party (PNP) and Momoedonu's old BKV in March 2006. This did not eventuate, however, and he entered private sector business as Chairman of Ba Provincial Holdings, Ltd.

Political offices
Preceded by Mahendra Chaudhry; Laisenia Qarase	Prime Minister of Fiji; 2000; 2001	Succeeded by office declared vacant Laisenia Qarase
Diplomatic posts
Preceded by ?	Ambassador of Fiji to Japan; 2002–2006	Succeeded by Ratu Inoke Kubuabola
