= People's Coalition (Fiji) =

Political alliance in Fiji

The People's Coalition was an alliance of three political parties in Fiji, formed in March 1999 to contest the parliamentary election to be held in May that year. The three parties were the Fiji Labour Party (FLP), led by Mahendra Chaudhry, the Fijian Association Party (FAP), led by Adi Kuini Speed, and the Party of National Unity (PANU), led by Apisai Tora.

Campaigning against the SVT-NFP-UGP coalition supporting the incumbent Prime Minister Sitiveni Rabuka, the People's Coalition won a landslide victory, taking 52 of the 71 seats in the House of Representatives. Of these, 37 seats were from Chaudhry's FLP, and, despite protests from the FAP, Chaudhry was sworn in as Fiji's first ethnic Indo-Fijian Prime Minister.

A fourth party, the Christian Democratic Alliance (VLV), joined the coalition after the election.

All members of the coalition had defections both before and after the coup d'état which deposed the Chaudhry government in May 2000. All except the FLP disappeared from the House of Representatives at the election held to restore democracy in September 2001.
