= Jioji Konrote =

President of Fiji from 2015 to 2021

Major-General The Honourable George Konrote CF MC

President of Fiji
- In office 12 November 2015 – 12 November 2021
- Prime Minister: Frank Bainimarama
- Preceded by: Ratu Epeli Nailatikau
- Succeeded by: Ratu Wiliame Katonivere

Personal details
- Born: Jioji Konousi Konrote; 26 December 1947 (age 78) Rotuma, Fiji
- Party: FijiFirst
- Spouse: Sarote Faga Konrote
- Children: 2
- Education: Natabua High School

Military service
- Allegiance: Republic of Fiji
- Branch/service: Republic of Fiji Military Forces
- Rank: Major-General

Major-General Jioji "George" Konousi Konrote, OF, MC (born 26 December 1947) is a Fijian politician and retired Major-General of the Fiji Military who served as the President of Fiji from 2015 to 2021. After commanding a peacekeeping mission in Lebanon, Konrote served as Fiji's High Commissioner to Australia from 2001 to 2006, as Minister of State for Immigration briefly in 2006, and as Minister for Employment Opportunities, Productivity and Industrial Relations from 2014 to 2015. He was the first non-iTaukei president (as he is Rotuman), the first not to be a chief, and the first Seventh-day Adventist to be elected by parliament, as previous presidents were selected by the Great Council of Chiefs.

== Early life and military career ==
Konrote is a native of the island of Rotuma. His days as a pupil at Natabua High School in Lautoka, Fiji, are described in the prize-winning book on Fiji Kava in the Blood by Peter Thomson.

A career soldier, Konrote enlisted into the RFMF in 1966 and trained with New Zealand and Australian defence forces, studying at institutions such as the Australian College of Defence and Strategic Studies and the Australian Defence Force Academy in Canberra, Australia, (where he became a Fellow in 1996), and Harvard Kennedy School at Harvard University in 2000.

Rising through the ranks of the Fijian military, he commanded battalions of Fijian soldiers in their peacekeeping efforts in Lebanon during the Fiji's UNIFIL campaign, and was subsequently appointed Deputy Force Commander of the UNIFIL operation, and finally the United Nations Assistant Secretary-General and Force Commander in Lebanon. In recognition of his contributions in these fields, Konrote was awarded the UNIFIL Peace Medal (1978), the Military Cross (UK, 1982), the Order of Merit (Italy, 1997), the Order of the Cedar (Lebanon, 1999) and was made an Officer of the Order of Fiji (Military Division) in 1997.

== Diplomatic and political career ==
From 2001 to 2006, Konrote served as Fiji's High Commissioner to Australia. After his appointment, equivalent to that of an ambassador, expired at the end of March 2006, he was elected to represent the Rotuman Communal Constituency in the 2006 election, and he was subsequently appointed as Minister of State for Immigration and Ex-Servicemen in the Cabinet of Laisenia Qarase. His role in this portfolio abruptly ended when the government was deposed in a military coup led by Commodore Frank Bainimarama on 5 December 2006.

Despite serving in the Qarase government, Konrote became a candidate for Bainimarama's party, FijiFirst, in the 2014 election, winning 1,585 votes. He was subsequently appointed as Minister for Employment Opportunities, Productivity and Industrial Relations in September 2014.

On 12 October 2015, Konrote resigned from Parliament after being elected as President of Fiji. He was sworn in on 12 November 2015. Prince Harry and Meghan, Duchess of Sussex ate at the State dinner at the GPH with Parliament Speaker Dr. Jiko Luveni, President Jioji Konrote and First Lady Sarote, on 23 October 2018.

Political offices
Preceded by Ratu Epeli Nailatikau	President of Fiji; 2015–2021	Succeeded by Ratu Wiliame Katonivere
