= Ratu =

Austronesian honorific title for male Fijians of chiefly rank

Ratu ([ˈrɑːtu]) is an Austronesian title used by male Fijians of chiefly rank. An equivalent title, adi (pronounced [ˈandi]), is used by females of chiefly rank. In the Malay language, the title ratu is also the traditional honorific title to refer to the ruling king or queen in Javanese culture (though it has since been used in modern contexts to refer to both queen regnant and queen consort of any nation, e.g. "Ratu Elizabeth II" and "Ratu Camilla"). Thus in Java, a royal palace is called "keraton", constructed from the circumfix ke- -an and Ratu, to describe the residence of the ratu.

Ratu: A chiefly title for men used alone as a form of address, or in front of the chief's name, only in certain places The source of the Fijian title is Verata, and it has spread throughout Fiji during the past century, now applied to many local, minor chiefs as well as the major ones. The concept of his type of title is from Tonga. Strictly speaking, the title belongs only in Verata. In their time, Cakobau or Tanoa, his father, never themselves used the title of Ratu. It does not appear with Cakobau's name or any other chief's name in the Deed of Cession of 1874. (Exceptionally, in the 1850s, Ratu Mara Kapaiwai was one of the few who did use the word Ratu, though that may have been a name rather than a title.) It has been affixed to the names of Tana and Cakobau by later Fijians, retroactively. The Cakobau Memorial Church on Bau Island is now referred to as the Ratu Cakobau Church. Ratu may also be used as a personal first name or second name. The title may be acquired as part of a chiefly name, by a namesake. In such cases, it does not imply chiefly status. Adi is the female equivalent, sometimes heard as Yadi in Lau.

== Etymology ==
Ra is a prefix in many titles (ramasi, ramalo, rasau, ravunisa, ratu), and tu means simply "chief". The formal use of "ratu" as a title in a name (as in "Sir" in British tradition) was not introduced until after the cession of 1874. Until then, a chief would be known only by his birth name and his area-specific traditional title.

Regional variations include ro in Rewa and parts of Naitasiri and Tailevu, roko in parts of Naitasiri, Rewa and Lau (particularly the Moala group), ra in parts of Vanua Levu, particularly the province of Bua.

In all those places, it is used as a title preceding the person's name, much like "prince", "duke", "earl", "baron" or "lord".

The semantics, however, are a little different in Fijian although the name and title are usually reversed, for example:

In English, one would say His Royal Highness (Styling) Prince (address/title) Phillip (name), Duke of Edinburgh (noble title).

In Fijian, one would say, Gone Turaga Na (Styling) Roko Tui Bau (noble title), Ratu (address/title) Joni Madraiwiwi (name).

== Fijian nobility ==
The Fijian nobility consists of about seventy chiefs, each of whom descends from a family that has traditionally ruled a certain area. The chiefs are of differing rank, with some chiefs traditionally subordinate to other chiefs. The Vusaratu clan is regarded as the highest chiefly clan, with regards to the people of Bau until the rise of the Tui Kaba clan leader, who exiled all Vusaratu members. They are the heirs of Ratu Seru Epenisa Cakobau, the Vunivalu of Bau or Tui Levuka (Paramount Chief of Bau, on the eastern side of Viti Levu, Fiji's most populous island), He proclaimed himself "Tui Viti/King of Fiji" in 1871. (He was only recognised by the British and a few provinces of Viti Levu) He along with 12 high Chiefs subsequently ceded the islands to the United Kingdom in 1874.

Other prominent chiefly clans include the Vuanirewa (the traditional rulers of the Lau Islands) and the Ai So'ula (the traditional rulers of Vanua Levu).

During the colonial rule (1874–1970), the British kept Fiji's traditional chiefly structure and worked through it. They established what was to become the Great Council of Chiefs, originally an advisory body, but it grew into a powerful constitutional institution. Constitutionally, it functions as an electoral college to choose Fiji's president (a largely honorary position modelled on the British monarchy), the vice-president, and 14 of the 32 senators, members of Parliament's "upper house", which has a veto over most legislation. The 18 other senators are appointed by the Prime Minister (9), the Leader of the Opposition (8), and the Council of Rotuma (1); these appointees may, or may not, be of chiefly rank also. (The Senate was modelled on Britain's House of Lords, which consists of both hereditary and life peers.)

The presidency, vice-presidency, and fourteen senators are the only constitutional offices whose appointment is controlled by persons of chiefly rank. Chiefs in post-independence Fiji have always competed for parliamentary seats on an equal footing with commoners. In the years following independence, this favored the chiefly class, as the common people looked to them as their leaders and generally voted for them. For several elections, many ethnic Fijian members of the House, which is elected by universal suffrage, were of chiefly rank, but in recent elections, the discrepancy between chiefs and commoners is slowly narrowing, as commoners are becoming better educated and have begun to work their way into the power structure. The chiefs, however, retain enormous respect among the Fijian people. In times of crisis, such as the coups of 1987 and the third coup of 2000, the Great Council of Chiefs often stepped in to provide leadership when the modern political institutions had broken down.

== Notable chiefs ==
- Sir George Cakobau; Fiji's first native-born governor-general
- Seru Epenisa Cakobau; Fijian monarch who ceded the islands to the United Kingdom
- Sir Penaia Ganilau; Fiji's first president and last governor-general
- Josefa Iloilo; former president
- Sir Kamisese Mara; Founding father; longest-running prime minister and president
- Tevita Momoedonu; former prime minister
- Sir Lala Sukuna; Soldier, scholar, and statesman. First Fijian university graduate. Read law at Oxford. Former Speaker of the Legislative Council
- Epeli Nailatikau; former president and current Speaker of Parliament
- Joni Madraiwiwi; former vice-president, former high court judge and prominent lawyer.
- J.A.R. Dovi; first fully qualified medical doctor.
- Peni Volavola; former lord mayor of Suva and Methodist church official.
- Udre Udre; Guinness World Record for "most prolific cannibal", reportedly ate between 872 and 999 people
