= 2013 Constitution of Fiji =

Fourth constitution of Fiji that came into effect in 2013

The 2013 Constitution of Fiji is the fourth constitution of Fiji, signed into law by President Ratu Epeli Nailatikau on 6 September 2013, coming into effect immediately. It is the first to eliminate race-based electoral rolls, race-based seat quotas, district-based representation, the unelected upper chamber, and the role of the hereditary Council of Chiefs. It vests sole legislative authority in a single-chamber, 50-seat, at-large Parliament, to be first convened following general elections in 2014. It is also the first ever to grant the right to multiple citizenship (in effect since 2009 by decree, on abrogation of the 1997 constitution), and lowers the voting age to 18.

== Background ==
Fiji's first constitution, implemented in 1970 at the time of independence from the UK, contained negotiated provisions to enshrine the political supremacy of the minority indigenous population. When an Indo-Fijian dominated government was elected despite these safeguards, the 1987 Fijian coups d'état took place, resulting in even tighter measures in the 1990 constitution.

Widespread Indo-Fijian dissent, coupled with a population shift back to an indigenous majority, prompted a more inclusive approach in the 1997 constitution. This was followed by the election of the first Indo-Fijian Prime Minister, and the violent, failed civilian coup of 2000. The 2013 constitution gave Indo-Fijians equal status in the country.

== Rationale ==
The 2000 coup was ended by military intervention. Fifteen people died. Power was handed over to a civilian administration, which subsequently won the 2001 elections — depending for its majority on elements that had been supportive of the coup — and granted early release to several conspirators who had been imprisoned. It also proposed legislation that would have extended amnesty to those involved (the Reconciliation, Tolerance, and Unity Bill).

This angered the head of the Republic of Fiji Military Forces, Frank Bainimarama, who spoke out against the government, formally demanded a reversal, withstood an attempt to replace him, and eventually launched his own bloodless coup in December 2006.

As Prime Minister, Bainimarama declared that the race-based electoral system — which he characterized as insulating the well-connected not only from political consequences but from justice and the law — had to be reformed before new elections were held. After months of international pressure, he announced elections for 2009, but then reversed himself, saying that a whole new system (a new census, a new voter's list, and a new constitution) would need to be established to prevent a return to the "coup culture."

In 2008, the government-appointed National Council for Building a Better Fiji released the People's Charter for Change, Peace and Progress, which established guidelines for drafting a new constitution, and in 2012 public hearings began across the country to solicit input from the community.

== Criticism ==
In 2012 the military regime appointed a constitutional commission to draft a new constitution as part of a return to democracy. In December 2012, Mosese Tikoitoga ordered all copies of the draft seized and demanded the prosecution of commission chair Yash Ghai. The draft was subsequently discarded and a new, military-drafted constitution imposed.

Original draft author Yash Ghai has publicly disagreed with changes in the final document, including the removal of regional representation, maintaining that it favors larger political parties.

In August 2024 the government of Sitiveni Rabuka announced it would begin a process to amend the constitution.

== See also ==
- People's Charter for Change, Peace and Progress
- 1997 Constitution of Fiji
