= Kamisese Mara =

President of Fiji from 1993 to 2000

His Excellency The Right Honourable Ratu Sir Kamisese Mara CF GCMG KBE
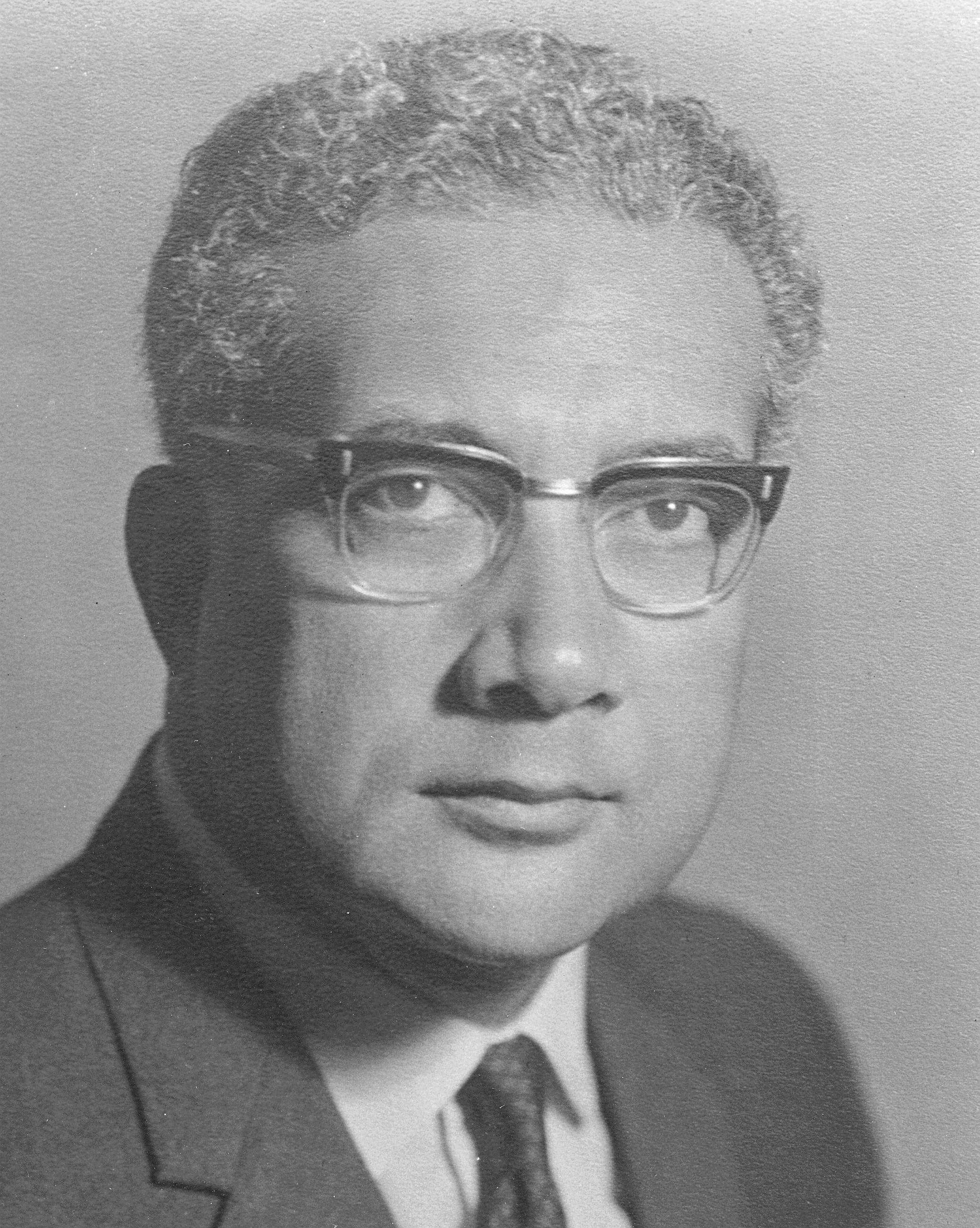

President of Fiji
- In office 16 December 1993 – 29 May 2000; Acting: 16 December 1993 – 18 January 1994
- Prime Minister: Sitiveni Rabuka; Mahendra Chaudhry; Ratu Tevita Momoedonu
- Preceded by: Ratu Sir Penaia Ganilau
- Succeeded by: Frank Bainimarama; Head of the Interim Military Government

2nd First Vice-President of Fiji
- In office 2 June 1992 – 15 December 1993 Serving with Ratu Sir Josaia Tavaiqia; Second Vice-President of Fiji
- President: Ratu Sir Penaia Ganilau
- Prime Minister: Sitiveni Rabuka
- Preceded by: Ratu Sir Josaia Tavaiqia
- Succeeded by: Ratu Sir Josaia Tavaiqia

4th Leader of the Opposition (Fiji)
- In office 13 April 1987 – 14 May 1987
- Governor General: Ratu Sir Penaia Ganilau
- Preceded by: Harish Sharma
- Succeeded by: Vacant

1st Prime Minister of Fiji
- In office 10 October 1970 – 13 April 1987
- Monarch: Elizabeth II
- Governors General: Sir Robert Sidney Foster; Ratu Sir George Cakobau; Ratu Sir Penaia Ganilau
- Deputy: Edward Cakobau; Penaia Ganilau; David Toganivalu; Mosese Qionibaravi
- Preceded by: Himself; As Chief Minister
- Succeeded by: Timoci Bavadra
- In office 5 December 1987 – 2 June 1992
- President: Ratu Sir Penaia Ganilau
- Deputy: Josefata Kamikamica; Sitiveni Rabuka; Tomasi Vakatora
- Preceded by: Vacant
- Succeeded by: Sitiveni Rabuka

1st Chief Minister of Fiji
- In office 20 September 1967 – 10 October 1970
- Monarch: Elizabeth II
- Governor: Sir Derek Jakeway; Sir Robert Sidney Foster
- Preceded by: None (new office)
- Succeeded by: Himself; As Prime Minister

Personal details
- Born: 6 May 1920 Lomaloma, Vanua Balavu, Colony of Fiji, British Empire
- Died: 18 April 2004 (aged 83) Suva, Fiji
- Resting place: Tubou, Lakeba, Fiji
- Party: Alliance Party
- Spouse(s): Ro Lady Lala Mara (née Tuisawau); 11 September 1949 – 18 April 2004 (his death)
- Children: Ateca Ganilau; Koila Nailatikau; Asenaca Kakua; Finau Mara; Joji Tuisawau; Litia Cakobau; Elenoa Tuilau; Tevita Mara
- Parents: Tevita Uluilakeba III (father); Lusiana Qolikoro (mother)
- Education: University of Otago; London School of Economics; Wadham College, Oxford
- Profession: Economist

Ratu Sir Kamisese Mara, CF, GCMG, KBE (6 May 1920 – 18 April 2004) was a Fijian politician who served as Chief Minister from 1967 to 1970, when Fiji gained its independence from the United Kingdom, and, apart from one brief interruption in 1987, as the first Prime Minister from 1970 to 1992. He subsequently served as president from 1993 until his resignation in 2000.

== Early life and education: 1920 to 1950 ==
Kamisese Kapaiwai Tuimacilai Uluilakeba Mara was born on 6 May 1920, in Sawana, Lomaloma, Vanuabalavu in the archipelago of Lau, the son of Ratu Tevita Uluilakeba III, Tui Nayau and head of the chiefly Vuanirewa clan of Tubou, Lakeba and Lusiana Qolikoro from the Fonolahi Family of the Yavusa Tonga clan in Sawana. Fonolahi has lineage to the Tongan royalty and was also descended from an English missionary.

Mara's title, Ratu, which means "Chief," was hereditary; as the hereditary Paramount Chief of the Lau Islands, he held the titles of Tui Lau in 1963, and Tui Nayau kei Sau ni Vanua ko Lau in 1969. He succeeded to the Tui Nayau title in 1969, following the death of his father in 1966. He was earlier installed as Tui Lau in 1963 following the traditional consultation process between the Yavusa Tonga in Sawana, Lomaloma and the Tui Nayau his father. Though the title Tui Lau is not hereditary it has been left vacant by his cousin¹ Ratu Sir Lala Sukuna, who had died in 1958.

Ratu Mara was first educated at Primary in Levuka (Sacred Heart Convent) than to Lau Provincial school before he left for his secondary education in an all boys boarding school in North of Tailevu (Queen Victoria School), he later moved to Marist Brothers High School Suva and Sacred Heart College, Auckland. He then attended the University of Otago in New Zealand, where he studied medicine (1942 to 1945). He never finished his medical studies, because his great-uncle and mentor, Ratu Sir Lala Sukuna (who was then regarded as Fiji's paramount chief), seeking to groom him for future leadership of the nation, arranged for him to study history at Wadham College, Oxford in the United Kingdom. Mara was distressed to abandon his medical studies, but, dependent on Ratu Sukuna for financial support, followed his orders without question, and graduated with an MA in 1949. In 1961, he returned to the United Kingdom to pursue postgraduate study at the London School of Economics for a Diploma in Economics and Social Administration, which he was awarded in 1962. In 1973, his old alma mater, Otago University, awarded him an honorary doctorate of laws (LL.D).

== Wife & Children ==
Following his graduation from Oxford University, Mara returned to Fiji and had married Ro Litia Cakobau Lalabalavu Katoafutoga Tuisawau, better known as Ro Lady Lala Mara, on 11 September 1949. Her title, Ro, is also hereditary and is held by Rewan chiefs; like her husband, Ro Lala was a chief in her own right, as the Roko Tui Dreketi (Paramount Chief) of Burebasaga and Rewa. The marriage was initially opposed by some members of Mara's family, as Ro Lala was from a rival dynasty with which the Mara clan had a history of strained relations. The marriage proved to be a happy one, however, and in stark contrast to the prevalence of divorce among many of Mara's relatives, it lasted for more than 53 years. They had three sons and five daughters.Koila Nailatikau was married to Epeli Nailatikau who would later become the 4th President of Fiji. Ateca Ganilau was married to Ratu Epeli Ganilau and supported many of his political views. Asenaca Kakua, Unlike her siblings she didn't have a career in government or diplomacy, She instead attends ceremonial and traditional events. Finau Mara who was the main heir to his late father's chiefly titles till his death during the Covid-19 Pandemic, Finau Served as a member of the House of Representatives and as the Minister for Fijian Affairs from 1997 to 1999. Ratu Joji Tuisawau who is named after his grandfather George Tuisawau lived a very private life. Adi Litia Mara Dugdale she is a prominent figure in the Pacific fashion scene, She married Henry Stratford Dugdale, an Englishman from Shropshire, in 1991 and had 2 kids with him. Adi Elenoa Tuilau Mara Taito is the twin sister of Tevita Mara, and is a high ranking member of the Vuanirewa clan, She also She serves as a co-patron of the Lau Education Charitable Trust (LECT). Tevita Mara, Was made Tui Lau and Tui Nayau in 2025, Later that year he was elected Deputy Chair of the restored Great Council of Chiefs

== Prime Minister of Fiji: 1970 to 1992 ==
With independence, the office of Chief Minister was renamed Prime Minister, but its functions were substantially unchanged. Mara retained power in the first post-independence election of 1972. Internal divisions within the ethnic Fijian electorate led to the narrow defeat of his Alliance Party by the Indo-Fijian dominated National Federation Party (NFP) in the election of March 1977. He tendered his resignation as Prime Minister, but the NFP splintered three days later in a leadership dispute, and a constitutional crisis developed. The official representative of Queen Elizabeth, Governor-General Ratu Sir George Cakobau, ended up calling on Mara to form a new government. Although unquestionably constitutional, the Governor-General's actions were controversial. Many Indo-Fijians were outraged at what they saw as a deliberate cynical move on his part to keep the government of Ratu Mara, his fellow-chief (and distant cousin) in power at all costs. A subsequent election to resolve the impasse in September that year, however, appeared to vindicate Cakobau, when the Alliance Party won a record 36 seats out of 52.

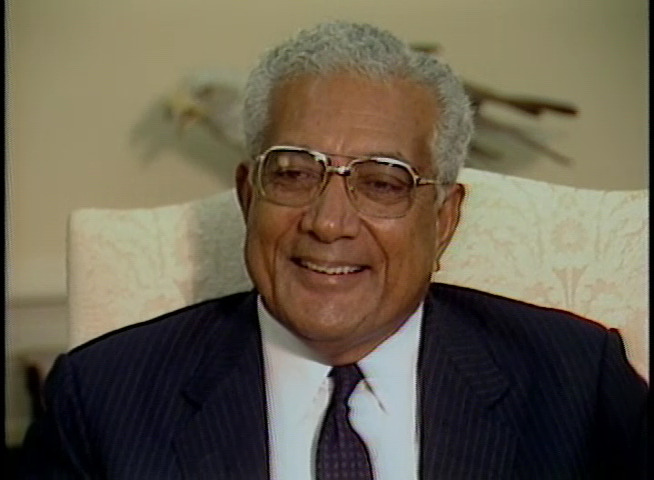
Mara visiting the United States (1984)

The Alliance Party's majority was reduced in the 1982 election, but with 28 of the 52 seats, Mara retained power. Despite the loss of eight seats, the popular vote for the Alliance Party rose to 51.8% – an all-time record. Part of the reason for this paradox lay in the distribution of the vote: the gains in the popular vote occurred mostly because of a swing of almost 10% in the 11 "communal" seats reserved for, and elected exclusively by, Indo-Fijians, but 24% of the Indo-Fijian vote was insufficient to translate into parliamentary seats, and therefore did not effectively offset small but very significant losses in ethnic Fijian "communal" seats. It was therefore a bittersweet election for Mara.

Convinced of the need to include Indo-Fijians in the government, he proposed a "government of national unity" – a grand coalition with the National Federation Party. The NFP, however, rejected the offer and remained in opposition. In the election of 1987, Mara was finally defeated by a multiracial coalition led by Dr Timoci Bavadra. His retirement was to be short-lived, however. Two military coups led by Lieutenant Colonel Sitiveni Rabuka seriously undermined the social and economic stability, and the international prestige, of Fiji. Mara was recalled to head an interim administration, with a view to restoring Fiji's international reputation and rebuilding the country's shattered economy. In 1992, he handed over power to an elected government.

== President of the Republic: 1993 to 2000 ==
After the military coups of 1987, Fiji had severed its links with the Monarchy and become a republic, with a president and two Vice-Presidents chosen by the Great Council of Chiefs. Following his retirement as Prime Minister, Mara was elected to the Vice-Presidency in June 1992, and became Acting president soon after, when the ailing president Ratu Sir Penaia Ganilau was incapacitated. He assumed the office of President officially when Ganilau died on 16 December of the following year. Modelled on the Monarchy, the presidency filled a largely honorary role, but was nevertheless vested with important reserve powers, to be used only in the event of a national crisis.

That crisis came on 19 May 2000, with the Fiji coup of 2000. Gunmen led by George Speight forced their way into Parliament and kidnapped the Prime Minister, Mahendra Chaudhry, several Cabinet ministers, and a number of parliamentarians. Speight declared himself Prime Minister, and ordered Mara to step aside as president. Mara refused to negotiate with the plotters, and decided instead to dismiss the kidnapped government and assume emergency powers himself. His move backfired, however. In what politicians called "a coup within a coup," Ratu Mara was whisked away on the naval ship Kiro on 28 May, where he was allegedly approached by a group of present and former military and police officers and ordered to suspend the Constitution. When he refused, ("If the Constitution goes, I go," he defiantly declared) the group, including the army commander, Commodore Frank Bainimarama, former Prime Minister and 1987 Coup Leader Sitiveni Rabuka, former military commander Ratu Epeli Ganilau (a son-in-law of Mara's), and a former Police Commissioner Isikia Savua, are alleged to have asked for, and possibly forced, Mara's resignation. He was subsequently taken to his home island of Lakeba in the Lau Islands. For the 80-year-old president, who was seen as the father of the country and had led it, in one capacity or another, for more than 40 years, it was an anticlimactic end.

The military regime that took over appointed Ratu Josefa Iloilo, who had been Mara's vice-president, to succeed him on 13 July 2000. After the coup had been quashed, the Supreme Court ruled on 15 November that year that Mara's replacement was unconstitutional and ordered his reinstatement, but Mara, wishing to spare the country further constitutional trauma, officially resigned, with his resignation retroactive to 29 May 2000.

On 29 April 2001, Mara publicly accused the police chief, Colonel Isikia Savua and former Prime Minister, Sitiveni Rabuka, of instigating the coup. In what was to be his last public interview, Mara claimed that George Speight – who was then in custody and has since been convicted of treason – was only a front, Mara told Close-Up on Fiji Television that he confronted Savua and Rabuka two days after the coup about their possible involvement. "I could see it in their faces," said Mara, emphatically rejecting their denials.

Mara told the programme that within half an hour of Speight's forcible occupation of the Parliament, Rabuka had telephoned Government House (the official residence of the president) to offer to form a government.

Mara said that he was shocked to learn that the Counter Revolutionary Warfare Unit of the Army had been involved in the coup. He alleged that they took George Speight to Parliament, and that their senior officers supplied them with weapons, blankets, and food. Mara also declared that the Counter Revolutionary Warfare officers who joined Speight's coup had trained on a farm owned by Rabuka. Excerpts of this interview were broadcast on 29 April 2001; the full interview was not broadcast until 29 April 2004 – while his body was lying in state in preparation for his funeral.

Whether Mara's resignation was in fact forced has been the subject of a police investigation since 21 May 2003, when the Police Investigations Department confirmed that they had opened an investigation into the events surrounding his departure from office. Mahendra Chaudhry, the deposed Prime Minister, has publicly supported Mara's version of events, and has further alleged that Mara was blackmailed with a threat to kill his daughter, Tourism Minister Adi Koila Nailatikau, who was one of the hostages. Commodore Bainimarama has defended his role in the incident saying it was "necessary" at the time, and that Mara's resignation was, in fact, voluntary and that he had refused offers of reinstatement. Mara's daughter, Adi Ateca Ganilau (wife of Ratu Epeli Ganilau) appeared to support Bainimarama's claims in a statement on 10 January 2005, saying that her father had resigned and had refused to return because he was upset by the abrogation of the Constitution. "He did not agree with the abrogation of the Constitution. That was probably why he refused to return to office. It was not that the military pressured him to move out," Ganilau said. She called for a thorough investigation into the abrogation of the Constitution, and for those who were legal advisers at the time to be answerable for their actions.

Police have said they have faced "many challenges" in their investigation, finding many officers uncooperative. On 30 April 2004, the Fijian police said they were closely examining the recording of Mara's last interview, in an attempt to uncover new leads. Police spokesman Mesake Koroi declared that there was a lot of hearsay and rumours in circulation that would not stand up in a court of law. "Unfortunately we are hitting a brick wall in our investigations at the moment," Koroi said. On 2 May 2005, however, Commodore Bainimarama agreed to make a statement to the police about his own role in Mara's resignation. Police Commissioner Andrew Hughes said that no charges could be brought against Commodore Bainimarama unless it could be proved that he had actually forced the president to resign. On 5 January 2006, Hughes said that Mara's departure from the Presidency was one of seven major cases the police were still working on.

== Evaluation ==
=== Sugarcane industry ===
Under Mara's leadership, Fiji became a giant in sugarcane production. Between 1970 and 1987, the sugarcane crop more than doubled, from under 250,000 tonnes to 502,000. The sugar industry continues to be the mainstay of Fiji's economy, and more than 90% of Fiji's sugar is exported. Mara's government led the way in negotiating special preferential marketing agreements with nations importing Fijian sugar, through the Lome Convention.

=== Pine industry ===
Mara also founded Fiji's pine industry. Today, pine plantations, virtually nonexistent 40 years ago, cover close to 480 square kilometres throughout the Fiji Islands, and there is an ongoing programme to further expand area in all parts of the country. Fiji now derives more than $40 to 50 million a year in foreign exchange earnings from its forestry sector. Of this total, more than half is from pinewood chips exports. This industry now provides a substantial and increasing source of income to those in rural areas, including especially the indigenous Fijian landowners.

=== International achievements and honours ===
In the 1960s, Mara led a revolt by Pacific Islands delegates that brought about a restructuring of the South Pacific Commission. He also helped to launch the Pacific Islands Producers' Association and the South Pacific Forum, both associations of Pacific nations, of which Fiji was a founder member.

Yet another significant Mara achievement was his contribution to the negotiations that led to the signing of a new United Nations International Law of the Sea Convention in 1982.

On the global stage, Mara was known for his strongly pro-American views. He supported visits to Fijian ports by nuclear-armed United States warships and submarines. He was a close ally of US President Ronald Reagan. Mara was also known for his support for Taiwan. Although he did not officially recognise the Republic of China, he never hid the fact that his true sympathies lay there, and the Taipei regime, in gratitude, helped to finance the publication of his memoirs.

Over the years, Mara received many honours from around the world. In addition to his knighthood (a Knight Commander of the Order of the British Empire (KBE), awarded in 1969), his honours from Queen Elizabeth II included the Meritorious Service Decoration, the Officer of the Order of the British Empire (1961), Knight Grand Cross of the Order of St Michael and St George (1983), Chancellor of the Order of Fiji, Companion of the Order of Fiji, and Knight Grand Cross of the Pian Order with Star (1995). He was also a member of the Privy Council in London beginning in 1973. Recognitions from other governments included being made a Grand Master of the Order of the National Lion in Dakar, Senegal in 1975, and the Order of Diplomatic Service Merit of South Korea in 1978. He was also a Knight of the Most Venerable Order of St John, and became Chancellor of the University of the South Pacific at Suva, which was founded with the support of his government. In 2000, Island Business Magazine named him Pacific Man of the Century, in recognition of his pivotal role in the founding of the South Pacific Forum.

=== Criticisms ===
There were criticisms of his leadership, too, some of which he eventually acknowledged. Many Indo-Fijians criticised him for not doing more to thwart the 1987 coups which removed an Indo-Fijian dominated administration from office, and for giving his consent to a new constitution, drafted in 1990, which guaranteed indigenous Fijian supremacy and was widely regarded as racist, even drawing comparisons from some quarters with South Africa's apartheid system. Mara defended his role in the post-coup era of 1987 to 1992, arguing that he was doing the best he could in circumstances that he could not fully control, and that it had seemed better at the time to connive in the writing of a discriminatory constitution than to risk civil war at the hands of ethnic Fijian extremists. In 1996, he publicly apologised to the Indo-Fijian community for his role in the drafting of the 1990 Constitution. Mahendra Chaudhry, the leader of the Indo-Fijian community who in 1999 became Fiji's first Indo-Fijian Prime Minister, said that he did not agree with, but understood, Mara's reasons for acting as he did, and accepted his apology for having done so. Other opponents, both Indo-Fijian and ethnic Fijian, were less forgiving, however.

Sitiveni Rabuka, who led the 1987 coup, surprised many in 1999 when he claimed in an autobiography that he had carried out the coups at Mara's behest. Mara retaliated by suing him for defamation. Mahendra Chaudhry said that he did not believe that Mara had been involved.

Not all of Mara's critics were Indo-Fijian. George Speight, a commoner (i.e., one of non-chiefly ancestry) who led the 2000 putsch accused Mara of selling the country out to Indo-Fijians, and of working to keep power in the hands of a coalition of Fijian chiefs and Indo-Fijian businessmen, at the expense of Fijian commoners.

== Later life and death ==
Following his resignation, Mara retired to his native island of Lakeba. He continued to influence politics in Fiji, where democracy was subsequently restored, through his membership of the Great Council of Chiefs, which not only advised the government but also functioned as an electoral college to choose the President of the Republic, as well as 14 of the 32 members of the Senate; at the time of his death, he was the longest-serving member of the Council. He remained Chairman of the Lau Provincial Council, a position he had held concurrently with his national offices for many years.

Mara suffered a stroke late in 2001 while visiting Port Vila, Vanuatu, with two of his longtime friends, businessmen Hari Punja and Joe Ruggiero. He died in Suva on 18 April 2004, from complications arising from the stroke. His state funeral, led by Roman Catholic Archbishop Petero Mataca, which was spread out over three days (28 to 30 April) saw an estimated 200,000 people – almost a quarter of Fiji's total population – line the streets to pay their last respects to the man they regarded as the father of the nation, in an outpouring of public grief not seen since the death of Mara's presidential predecessor, Ratu Sir Penaia Ganilau, over a decade earlier.

== Legacy ==
Even in death, Ratu Mara stirred controversy. His state funeral was by no means universally popular, even among his close supporters. Claiming to speak for many of those who had been close to the late president, Joseph Browne, who had been his official secretary, claimed that it was the "height of hypocrisy" to have the armed forces, still commanded by the same officers who had unceremoniously deposed Mara from the presidency four years earlier, honouring him at his funeral now.

A one-year period of mourning for the late Chief ended on 13 May 2005, with the close of a series of ceremonies that started on the 9th. Those who had been observing mourning rituals symbolically changed from black clothes into their normal attire. (Members of the Mara family, however, said that they would continue to wear black for a further three months, until the period of mourning for his wife, Adi Lala, is over). Thousands of people arrived in the chiefly village of Tubou on the island of Lakeba to take part in the vakataraisulu ritual, which lifted taboos in place for the Mara family and the people of the Lau Islands. Mara's son, Ratu Finau Mara, who is widely expected to be named his successor as Tui Nayau, or Paramount Chief of the Lau Islands, was expected to participate in the vakataraisulu at the request of elders from Tubou and Levuka, but for undisclosed reasons, remained in Suva. In 2004, he had attended his father's state funeral in Suva but not his private funeral in Lakeba. His younger brother, Roko Tevita Uluilakeba, was believed to be out of the country.

Addressing the Lau Provincial Council in Ratu Mara's honour, Fiji's current vice-president, Ratu Joni Madraiwiwi praised him as a man of vision and compassion, who hated lies and lived by the truth. He praised him as a committed Christian who practised what he preached, and who did not differentiate between people but treated all men alike whatever their race or religion. Madraiwiwi called on all Lauans to follow Mara's example.

Another controversy was reported by the Fiji Times on 8 January 2006. His family was displeased, his daughter Adi Ateca Ganilau told the Times, that the same government that was working to release from prison persons convicted of offences related to the coup which deposed him, was also promoting an independent biography to be written by Australian academic Derrick Scarr, formerly of the Australian National University. This was contradictory, she said. "On one hand they want to praise him but on the other they are working to free those people who ousted him through the Reconciliation Bill," she said, referring to controversial legislation introduced by the Fijian government in 2005, aimed at establishing a Commission empowered to propose amnesty for coup-convicts. She reiterated her previously stated opposition to the release of coup-perpetrators, saying that he father would not have stood for it if he were alive.

Jioji Kotobalavu, the chief executive officer of the Prime Minister's Department, rejected the criticism, saying that the government was not financing the book and that its involvement was limited to ensuring that Scarr had access to information sources. He considered that co-operation in the writing of the biography would be a fitting tribute to Ratu Mara, whom he called a great man. The Mara family should discuss any reservations with Scarr himself, Kotobalavu said.

== Cricket ==
Mara played two first-class matches for Fiji against Otago and Canterbury in Fiji's 1953/54 tour of New Zealand. After scoring 44 runs against Canterbury he broke his arm, curtailing both his tour, in which he served as vice-captain, and first-class career.

In his two first-class matches Mara scored 64 runs at a batting average of 21.33, with a high score of 44. A right-arm fast-medium bowler, with the ball he took 8 wickets at a bowling average of 17.12, with best figures of 4/77.

Mara also played 8 non-first-class matches for Fiji from 1954 to 1956, with his final match for Fiji coming against the West Indies in Fiji's famous 28 run win over them, a match in which he captained Fiji to victory.

== Personal life ==
Mara's interests included cricket, rugby, golf, athletics, and fishing. Mara is cousins with one of Fiji's famous cricketer's, I.L. Bula. He was a member of the Achilles Club in London, the Defence Club in Suva, and the United Oxford and Cambridge Universities Club in the United Kingdom. Mara's character was described as a combination of the forthright and the diplomatic, the inflexible and the dexterous, the imperious and the tolerant. He was known as a strong, imposing personality, but with an ability to forgive his opponents. A convert to Catholicism, Mara wrote of his faith: "Certainly it has been the rock on which I have been able to rely in good times and in bad, and it is the lodestone of my life." He wrote an autobiography, The Pacific Way: A Memoir. Mara was survived by his wife, Adi Lala (who herself died on 20 July the same year), and by two sons and five daughters; one son predeceased him.

== Honours ==
- Fiji:
  - Companions of the Order of Fiji (CF)
  - Meritorious Service Decoration (MSD)
- Senegal:
  - Grand Cross of the National Order of the Lion - 1975
- South Korea:
  - Gwanghwa Medal of the Order of Diplomatic Service Merit - 1978
- United Kingdom:
  - Honorary Knight of the Most Venerable Order of Saint John (KSTJ)
  - Knight Grand Cross of the Order of St Michael and St George (GCMG) - 1983
  - Knight Commander of the Order of the British Empire (KBE) - 1969
  - Officer of the Order of the British Empire (OBE) - 1961
- Vatican:
  - Knight Grand Cross of the Order of Pope Pius IX (GCPO) - 1995

Political offices
Preceded by None (new office)	Chief Minister of Fiji; 1967–1970	Succeeded by Himself; As Prime Minister
Preceded by Himself; As Chief Minister	Prime Minister of Fiji; 1970–1987	Succeeded by Himself; Timoci Bavadra
Preceded by Harish Sharms	Leader of the Opposition; 1987	Succeeded by Vacant
Preceded by Vacant	Prime Minister of Fiji; 1987–1992	Succeeded by Sitiveni Rabuka
Preceded by Ratu Sir Josaia Tavaiqia	First Vice-President of Fiji†; 1992–1993	Succeeded by Ratu Sir Josaia Tavaiqia
Preceded by Ratu Sir Penaia Ganilau	Acting; President of Fiji; 1993–1994	Succeeded by Himself; As substantive President
Preceded by Himself; As Acting President	Acting; President of Fiji; 1994–2000	Succeeded by Frank Bainimarama; Head of the Interim Military Government
Preceded by	Chairman of the Lau Provincial Council ?-2004	Succeeded by Ratu Josefa Basulu
Titles of nobility
Preceded by Ratu Sir Lala Sukuna	Tui Lau; 1964–2004	Succeeded by Vacant
Preceded by Ratu Tevita Uluilakeba	Tui Nayau; 1969–2004	Succeeded by Vacant
