= President of Fiji =

Head of state

- Peresitedi ni Viti (Fijian) फिजी के राष्ट्रपति (Fiji Hindi)
- Presidential Standard

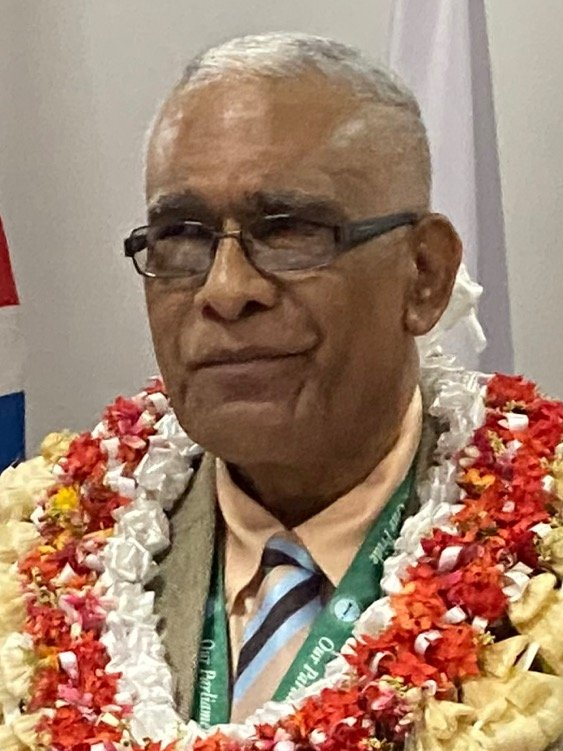
- Incumbent; Naiqama Lalabalavu since 12 November 2024
- Style: His Excellency
- Status: Head of state
- Residence: State House
- Appointer: Parliament of Fiji
- Term length: Three years, renewable once
- Constituting instrument: Constitution of Fiji (2013)
- Precursor: Monarchy of Fiji
- Inaugural holder: Penaia Ganilau
- Formation: 5 December 1987; 38 years ago
- Deputy: Vice-President of Fiji (1990–2013); Chief Justice of Fiji (2013–present)
- Salary: FJ$130,000 annually

The president of Fiji is the head of state of the Republic of Fiji. The president is appointed by the Parliament for a three-year term under the terms of the 2013 Constitution. Although not entirely a figurehead, the role of president in the government is largely ceremonial, but there are important reserve powers that may be exercised in the event of a crisis. In addition, the president is the commander-in-chief of the Republic of Fiji Military Forces.

== History of the office ==
The office of the president was established following two military coups in 1987 that led to the proclamation of a republic on 7 October, ending the Fijian monarchy. Major-General Sitiveni Rabuka, who had masterminded the coups, formed an interim military government with himself as its head. He did not, however, take the title of president, and on 5 December appointed Ratu Sir Penaia Ganilau, the last governor-general, as the first president of the republic.

A civilian putsch instigated by George Speight led to another constitutional upheaval in 2000. President Ratu Sir Kamisese Mara resigned on 29 May rather than abrogate the Constitution, as the military, supported by the Supreme Court, had asked. (Whether or not his resignation was forced was the subject of a police investigation that continued up to the time of the 2006 coup). Commodore Frank Bainimarama took power as the head of the interim military government (as had Rabuka in 1987), until Ratu Josefa Iloilo was appointed President on 13 July.

On 5 December 2006, the military forces again overthrew the government. Bainimarama declared himself acting president; he initially said that he had assumed the office in an interim capacity, and would soon ask the Great Council of Chiefs to reinstate Iloilo, but on 17 December he insisted that he was now the president and that the Great Council should recognise him as such. Iloilo was re-instated as President on 4 January 2007.

In January 2008, Bainimarama stated that the military was "the executive authority in the appointment of the President", following the suspension of the Great Council of Chiefs. The president would be a military appointee, until a reformed GCC were installed.

A few days later, Citizens Constitutional Forum director Reverend Akuila Yabaki suggested that the position of President should, in future, be open to persons of any ethnicity, rather than reserved for indigenous Fijians. This suggestion was controversial, and was notably opposed by deposed prime minister Laisenia Qarase. A Rewa chief, Ro Filipe Tuisawau, also opposed the idea, and stated his view on the function of the presidency:

The position of the president symbolises unity of both traditional structures of leadership which existed before parliamentary rule was established and the current Westminster system of parliament. This is where the Western system meets our traditional vanua system and we acknowledge the indigenous leadership that has evolved and catered for all races in our multicultural society. By nominating the President the nation is acknowledging the role our chiefs have played in society and I think the Fijian people would appreciate that the status quo stay.

On 28 July 2009, Iloilo announced that he would be leaving office on 30 July. Brigadier-General (Rtd) Ratu Epeli Nailatikau succeeded him as acting president. On 5 November 2009, Nailatikau was sworn in as president.

In March 2012, the Bainimarama government disestablished the Great Council of Chiefs by decree. Bainimarama confirmed this meant there would need to be a new method to appoint the president; this, he said, would be provided by a new Constitution, to be adopted in 2013 following consultations with the people.

On 12 October 2015, the Parliament elected Major-General (Rtd) Jioji Konrote as president. On 12 November 2015, Konrote was sworn in as president. On 31 August 2018, Konrote was re-elected as president.

On 22 October 2021, the Parliament elected Ratu Wiliame Katonivere as president. On 12 November 2021, Katonivere was sworn in as president.

== Privileges ==
=== Salary and allowances ===
The budget of the Office of the President of Fiji is $2.2 million FJD for the 2025–2026 fiscal year. Which mainly goes to pay for the administration that helps the President, Also specific funds have been allocated for the upkeeping of The State House. The President's current salary is $130,000 FJD (Non-Taxable). $200,000 FJD has been allocated for official overseas duty's.

=== Vehicles and property ===
The Office of the President of Fiji manages a significant portfolio of property across Viti Levu. The Official Residence is the State House located in the Capital, Suva. Then the president's office also maintains 2 other houses, the Taunovo Residence in Pacific Harbour and the Tavakubu Residence in Lautoka. There is also Borron House which is owned by the Government of Fiji; it served as the state's Guest House but it served as the Official Residence of the President of Fiji during Jioji Konrote's presidency. Toyota SUV's was mostly used by the President, but the new official car is a Hongqi H9 Executive Sedan which was gifted by the Chinese government.

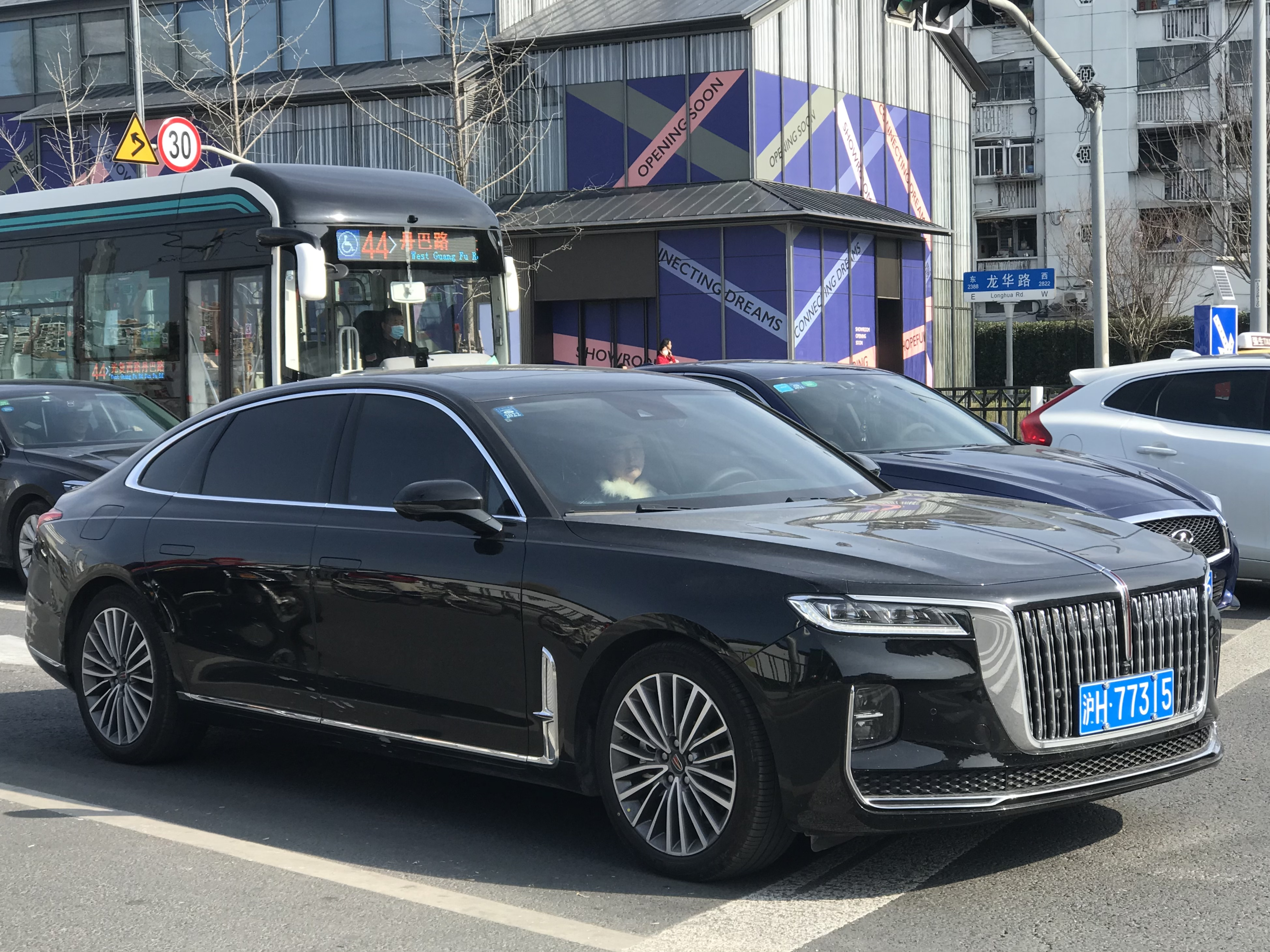
The Hongqi H9 Executive Model

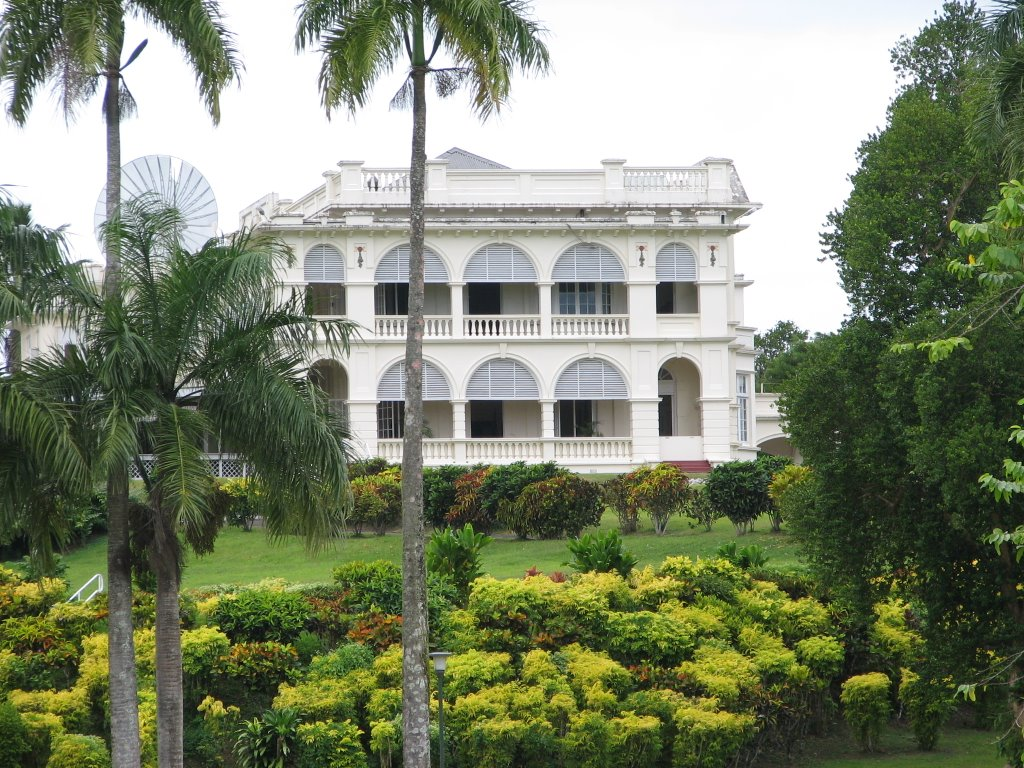
State House in Suva

== See also ==
- Governor-General of Fiji
- Prime Minister of Fiji
