= 2000 Fijian coup d'état =

Coup that overthrew Prime Minister Mahendra Chaudhry

- Part of the Fiji coups
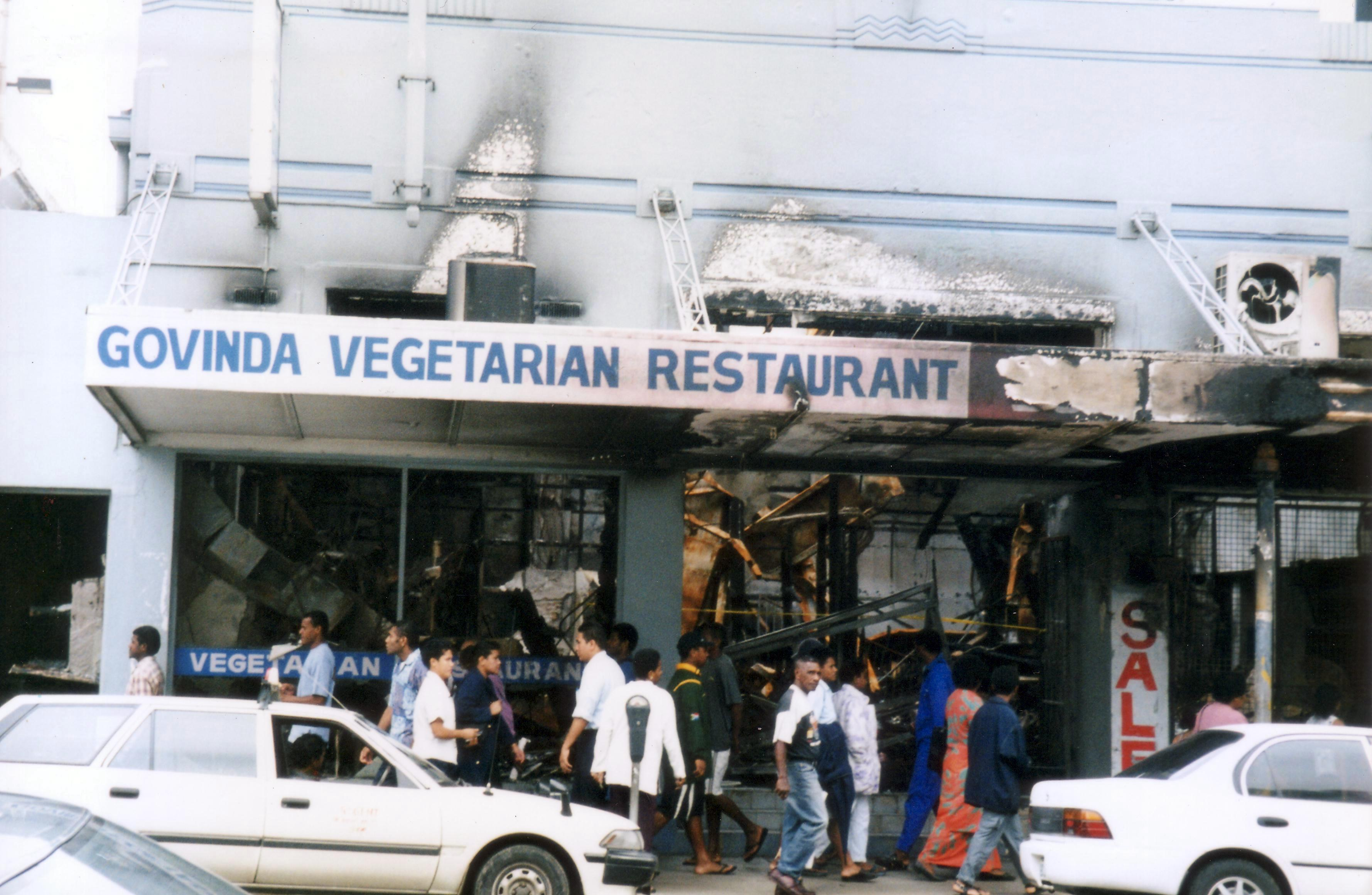
- The burnt out remains of Govinda's Restaurant in Suva: over 100 shops and businesses were ransacked in Suva's central business district on 19 May.
Date	19 May 2000 – 1 March 2001 (9 months, 1 week and 3 days)
Location	Fiji
Result	Coup partially successful: Coup leaders charged; Mahendra Chaudhry resigns as Prime Minister, with Tevita Momoedonu replacing him for just several minutes; Laisenia Qarase becomes Prime Minister following a victory at the 2001 election

Belligerents
Republic of Fiji: Military Forces; Police	Indigenous Fijian rebels: Fijian Army Mutineers; CRWU

Commanders and leaders
Kamisese Mara; Mahendra Chaudhry; Ratu Tevita Momoedonu; Frank Bainimarama; Laisenia Qarase; Josefa Iloilo	George Speight; Timoci Silatolu; Shane Stevens

Strength
Unknown	Unknown

Casualties and losses
3 soldiers killed 1 policeman killed	4 killed
- Hundreds of properties ransacked.

The 2000 Fijian coup d'état was a civilian coup d'état by an armed group of indigenous Fijian nationalists supported by the Counter Revolutionary Warfare Unit, against the elected government of Indo-Fijian Prime Minister Mahendra Chaudhry, on 19 May 2000. This was followed by President Kamisese Mara's attempt to assert executive authority on 27 May. Mara would resign under duress on 29 May, handing power to Frank Bainimarama, a commander of the Fijian military.

The coups resulted in the removal of the elected government and its replacement by an interim regime headed by Josefa Iloilo. In March 2001, the Court of Appeal of Fiji ruled that the coups and interim regime were illegal. An elected government was finally restored by the 2001 Fijian general election.

George Speight, the leader of the coup, was convicted of treason and sentenced to death. The sentence was commuted to life imprisonment, and on 18 September 2024, he was pardoned by Fiji's Mercy Commission.

== Background ==
The 1999 Fijian general election saw a resounding victory for the People's Coalition, a multiracial grouping of the Fiji Labour Party, Fijian Association Party, National Unity Party and Christian Democratic Alliance. The coalition won 54 of 71 seats, while the Soqosoqo ni Vakavulewa ni Taukei of Sitiveni Rabuka (who had come to power in the 1987 Fijian coups d'état) was reduced to 8 seats. Mahendra Chaudhry became the country's first Indo-Fijian Prime Minister.

Chaudhry's election angered hardline i-Taukei nationalists, as did his government's moves to renew agricultural leases and compensate farmers whose leases had expired. In September 1999, the Great Council of Chiefs rejected the government's plan to renew leases. Later that month, meetings were held around the country seeking the removal of the government, and former PANU leader Apisai Tora threatened to topple the government through protest marches and civil disobedience. A series of protest marches followed in April 2000, and a large march led by Iliesa Duvuloco was scheduled by 19 May.

== Seizure of Parliament ==
On 19 May 2000, the first anniversary of Chaudhry's election, a group of armed men led by businessman George Speight stormed the Fijian Parliament and took the government hostage. The coup was backed by Fiji's Counter Revolutionary Warfare Unit, who provided soldiers and weapons. Speight claimed to have seized power on behalf of ethnic Fijians, and purported to have revoked the 1997 constitution and appointed himself interim president and opposition MP Timoci Silatolu as interim prime minister. In the immediate aftermath of the takeover, participants in the protest march moved from Government House to surround parliament, while mobs of youths burned and looted Indo-Fijian-owned shops in Suva.

President Kamisese Mara responded by declaring a state of emergency and police imposed a curfew. Former Prime Minister Rabuka initially acted as a negotiator attempting to free the hostages, but was later dismissed after Speight decided he could no longer trust him. On 20 May, ten hostages were released after resigning from the government. In a televised press conference Speight swore in Jope Seniloli as interim president, and was then sworn in as prime minister, with Silatolu as his deputy and Rakuita Vakalalabure as attorney-general. Chaudhry was beaten after refusing to resign.

Police and the RFMF failed to control access to parliament, allowing people to come and go freely while negotiations continued. On 26 May, the RFMF finally attempted to establish a cordon, resulting in a confrontation with Speight in the presence of international media. The same day fifteen soldiers and two military officers defected to the rebels. The next day, 200 rebels confronted soldiers at the cordon, resulting in gunfire and two soldiers and a camera operator being wounded. The next day President Mara sacked Chaudhry for being unable to perform his functions and appointed Tevita Momoedonu, the sole cabinet member who was not in parliament when it was seized, as prime minister. After advising Mara to prorogue parliament for six months, Momoedonu resigned, leaving Mara with "unfettered executive authority".

== Military coup and negotiations ==
On 28 May, following the broadcast of a news segment critical of Speight, a rebel mob attacked the Fiji TV station, killing a police officer. The breakdown of law and order saw Chief Justice Timoci Tuivaga and other judges advise RFMF commander Frank Bainimarama to take control on the basis of "necessity". After a meeting with Bainimarama and Rabuka, Mara resigned. Bainimarama then declared martial law, revoked the 1997 constitution, and took control of the country, declaring himself head of state. Bainimarama initially named former army commander Epeli Nailatikau as prime minister, but withdrew the nomination the next day after objections from Speight. Bainimarama then deferred the appointment of a civilian government "until the climate is right", but committed that "Mahendra Chaudhry will no longer come back as Prime Minister". The military regime then began talks with Speight aimed at the release of the hostages. On 4 June, talks broke down, and the military issued an ultimatum, demanding Speight release the hostages and lay down his arms, and in return promising an amnesty.

Following the breakdown in negotiations the international community began to apply pressure. On 7 June 2000, the Commonwealth of Nations suspended Fiji. The European Union threatened to ban Fijian sugar if Fiji gave in to Speight's demands. On 14 June, the New Zealand government applied a travel ban to Speight and 84 of his associates, as well as Fijian sports teams. Australia followed with a sporting ban. Unionised Australian workers refused to load Fijian cargo.

On 12 June, the military fired warning shots at Speight's vehicle at a checkpoint as he was returning to parliament from talks. Speight called it "a failed assassination attempt", and refused to attend future negotiation sessions. Despite this, negotiations continued through intermediaries. On 18 June, the military agreed to some of Speight's nominees for the interim government, and Speight released four female hostages as a sign of good faith. Negotiations then deadlocked on the issue of the presidency, with Speight backtracking on an initial agreement for the president to be nominated by the Great Council of Chiefs and demanding instead that Ratu Josefa Iloilo be sworn in immediately. The military issued another ultimatum, which was rejected.

On 3 July 2000, Bainimarama named Laisenia Qarase as prime minister, heading an all-indigenous Fijian government. Speight was outraged by the decision, and a gun-battle broke out at Parliament the next day in which five people were injured. Chaos escalated, and rebels staged a number of incidents around the country. Soldiers at the Sukunaivalu Barracks in Labasa mutinied and declared support for Speight. Local landowners took over the Monasavu Dam, cutting power to Suva. On 8 July, rebels blocked the road between Suva and Nadi and stormed a police station in Korovou, taking 30 hostages. At Naboro Prison, 50 inmates rioted, taking guards hostage.

On 9 July, Speight signed the Muanikau Accord with the military, agreeing to release the hostages in exchange for an amnesty for himself. All his key demands had been met. Nine hostages were released on 12 July, and the remainder were released the next day after Iloilo was named president by the Great Council of Chiefs.

Following the return of hostages and weapons, Speight and his followers moved to Kalabu Fijian School on the outskirts of Suva. Speight continued to lobby over the makeup of the interim cabinet, demanding that Qarase be replaced as prime minister by Adi Samanunu Cakobau, and that rebels be given control of key portfolios. When the government rejected his demands, his spokesman Joe Nata threatened civil war.

On 26 July, Speight, Nata, and two others were arrested at a military checkpoint following threats to President Iloilo. The military then stormed his headquarters, killing one person and arresting 369 supporters.

== Aftermath ==
In the wake of the coup tourism collapsed by 30%, and Fiji's economy contracted 8.2%.

Despite Speight's arrest, violence by rebels continued. On 31 July, Speight supporters terrorised the village of Dreketi, taking 30 hostages. Soldiers who had mutinied at the Sukunaivalu Barracks did not surrender for six weeks. On 8 August, rebels ambushed a military patrol, killing one soldier and a policeman, and wounding three others. On 2 November 2000, soldiers of the Counter Revolutionary Warfare Unit loyal to Speight mutinied in the Queen Elizabeth Barracks mutiny, holding officers hostage in an attempt to depose military commander Frank Bainimarama. Two soldiers were killed and ten were injured when the military retook the barracks. Four of the rebels were tortured and killed by loyal soldiers in the aftermath.

On 15 November, the High Court of Fiji declared that the interim government was illegal. Mara remained the lawful President; Parliament had not been dissolved but only suspended, and should now be reconvened; and by implication, Chaudhry remained the lawful prime minister. Mara subsequently officially resigned, with his resignation backdated to 29 May. The Qarase government appealed the court ruling. On 1 March 2001, the Court of Appeal of Fiji confirmed the High Court decision reinstating the constitution in Republic of Fiji Islands v Prasad. The government accepted the decision, and new elections were subsequently held in August and September 2001.

On 18 February 2002, George Speight pleaded guilty to treason and was sentenced to death. The sentence was commuted to life imprisonment the same day by President Ratu Josefa Iloilo. Ten other rebels received sentences of between 18 months and three years for kidnapping. On 20 March 2003 Josefa Nata and Timoci Silatolu were convicted of treason. On 28 June 2003, both were sentenced to life imprisonment. In April 2005, Lands Minister Naiqama Lalabalavu, Senator Josefa Dimuri and two other Vanua Levu chiefs were sentenced to eight months imprisonment over his role in the Sukanaivalu Barracks mutiny. They were released to serve their sentences extramurally after only 11 days, and subsequently allowed to return to their seats in parliament.

In November 2002, 15 soldiers involved in the Queen Elizabeth barracks mutiny were sentenced to prison terms ranging from ten months to life imprisonment.

In 2005 the Qarase government proposed the Reconciliation, Tolerance, and Unity Bill to grant amnesty to those involved in the coup, leading to the 2005–2006 Fijian political crisis and the 2006 Fijian coup d'état.

In December 2024 the Rabuka government established the Fiji Truth and Reconciliation Commission to inquire into the 1987, 2000, and 2006 coups. In January 2025 Rabuka said he would identify those behind the coups to the commission.
