= Prime Minister of Fiji =

Head of government

- Paraiminisita ni Viti (Fijian) फिजी के प्रधानमंत्री (Fiji Hindi)
- Coat of arms of Fiji

- Flag of Fiji

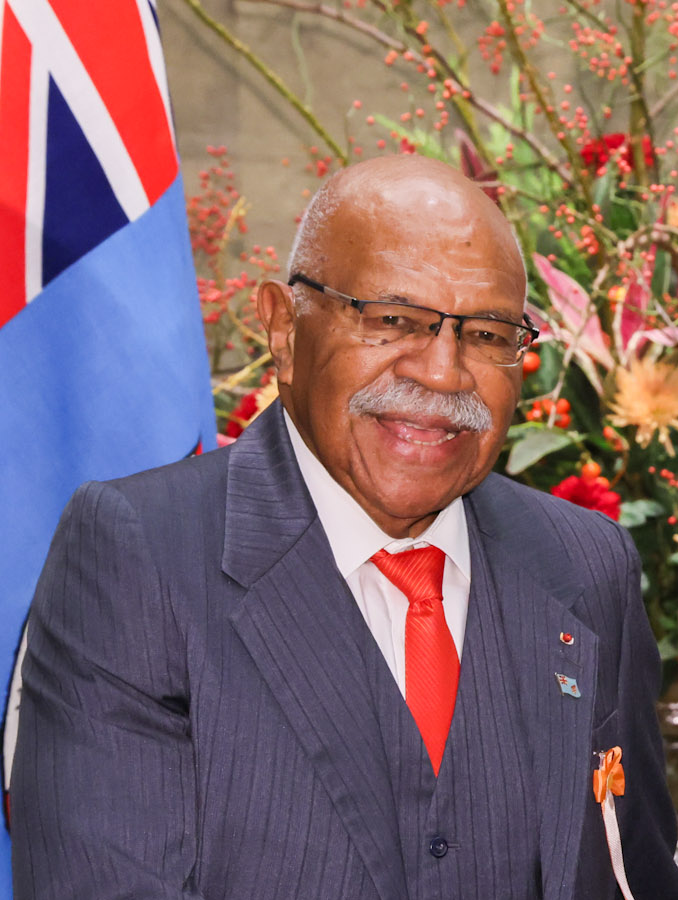
- Incumbent; Sitiveni Rabuka since 24 December 2022
- Government of Fiji; Cabinet of Fiji; Office of the Prime Minister; Parliament of Fiji
- Style: The Honourable
- Status: Head of government
- Member of: Cabinet
- Seat: Government Buildings
- Term length: Four years
- Precursor: Chief Minister of Fiji
- Inaugural holder: Kamisese Mara
- Formation: 10 October 1970; 56 years ago
- Deputy: Deputy Prime Minister of Fiji
- Salary: FJ$320,000 / US$145,100 annually
- Website: www.pmoffice.gov.fj

The prime minister of Fiji is the head of government of the Republic of Fiji. The prime minister is appointed under the terms of the 2013 Constitution. The prime minister is the head of the Cabinet and appoints and dismisses ministers.

== Description of the office ==
As a former British colony, Fiji has largely adopted British political models and follows the Westminster, or Cabinet, system of government, in which the executive branch of government is responsible to the legislature. Under the 2013 Constitution, the prime minister is the leader of the political party which has won more than half of the total number of seats in Parliament. If no such party exist, the Parliament elects the prime minister.

The prime minister of Fiji is technically the "first among equals," whose vote in meetings of the Cabinet carries no greater weight than that of any other minister. In practice, the prime minister dominates the government. Other ministers are appointed by the prime minister.

== History of the office ==
Ratu Sir Kamisese Mara was appointed Fiji's first prime minister on 10 October 1970, when Fiji attained its independence from Britain. Mara previously served as Fiji's first and only chief minister, from 20 September 1967 (while Fiji still was a British colony). Mara's first term as prime minister lasted until 13 April 1987. He returned to the office for the second term on 5 December 1987, serving until 2 June 1992. As of 2014, Mara is the longest-serving prime minister of Fiji.

== List of prime ministers of Fiji (1970–present) ==
No.	Portrait	Prime Minister	Took office	Left office	Time in office	Party	Election	Head(s) of state
Prime Ministers of the Dominion of Fiji
1	Kamisese Mara	Ratu Sir; Kamisese Mara (1920–2004)	10 October 1970	13 April 1987	16 years, 185 days	Alliance	1972; 1977 (Mar); 1977 (Sep); 1982	Elizabeth II
2	Timoci Bavadra	Timoci Bavadra (1934–1989)	13 April 1987	14 May 1987	31 days	Labour	1987	Elizabeth II
Vacant (14 May 1987 – 5 December 1987) (Note: Fiji was left without a prime minister following two military coups in 1987 and a civilian coup d'état in 2000.)
Prime Ministers of the Republic of Fiji
(1)	Kamisese Mara	Ratu Sir; Kamisese Mara (1920–2004) (Note: Mara's party, the Alliance Party, was dissolved in the wake of the 1987 coups, so he was effectively a nonpartisan prime minister in his last term.)	5 December 1987	2 June 1992	4 years, 180 days	Independent	—	Ganilau
3	Sitiveni Rabuka	Major General (Rtd); Sitiveni Rabuka (born 1948)	2 June 1992	19 May 1999	6 years, 351 days	SVT	1992; 1994	Ganilau; Mara
4	Mahendra Chaudhry	Mahendra Chaudhry (born 1942)	19 May 1999	27 May 2000	1 year, 8 days	Labour	1999	Mara
5	Tevita Momoedonu	Ratu; Tevita Momoedonu (1946–2020) (Note: Ratu Momoedonu was appointed Prime Minister on 27 May 2000, by the then-president, Ratu Sir Kamisese Mara, in order to meet a constitutional technicality. He resigned only a few minutes later, as soon as the technicality had been attended to, in order to allow the president to assume full executive power.)	27 May 2000	27 May 2000	0 days	Labour	—	Mara
Vacant (27 May 2000 – 4 July 2000)
6	Laisenia Qarase	Laisenia Qarase (1941–2020) (Note: Qarase was not a member of a political party when he headed the interim government in 2000 and early 2001. Following his reinstatement on 16 March 2001 (after two days' absence from office), he founded the United Fiji Party to contest the general election that was to be held later that year.)	4 July 2000	14 March 2001	253 days	Independent	—	Bainimarama; Iloilo
—	Tevita Momoedonu	Ratu; Tevita Momoedonu (1946–2020); Acting	14 March 2001	16 March 2001	2 days	Labour	—	Iloilo
(6)	Laisenia Qarase	Laisenia Qarase (1941–2020)	16 March 2001	5 December 2006	5 years, 264 days	SDL	2001; 2006	Iloilo
—	Jona Senilagakali	Dr. Jona Senilagakali (1929–2011); Acting (Note: Senilagakali was installed as Interim Prime Minister as Commodore Josaia Voreqe (Frank) Bainimarama took control of the government. He was previously a highly esteemed medical doctor, the former president of the Fijian Medical Association, and was military doctor at the time of the coup d'état in 2006.)	5 December 2006	4 January 2007	30 days	Independent	—	Bainimarama
—	Frank Bainimarama	Commodore; Frank Bainimarama (born 1954); Acting (Note: The Bainimarama government was dismissed as illegal by Fiji's Court of Appeal on 10 April 2009, leading to the prime minister's immediate resignation. He was re-appointed the next day by President Josefa Iloilo, following the latter's abrogation of the Constitution.)	5 January 2007	22 September 2014	7 years, 260 days	RFMF	—	Iloilo; Nailatikau
7	Frank Bainimarama	Rear Admiral (Rtd); Frank Bainimarama (born 1954)	22 September 2014	24 December 2022	8 years, 93 days	FijiFirst	2014; 2018	Nailatikau; Konrote; Katonivere
(3)	Sitiveni Rabuka	Major General (Rtd); Sitiveni Rabuka (born 1948)	24 December 2022	Incumbent	3 years, 329 days	People's Alliance	2022	Katonivere; Lalabalavu

== See also ==
- List of heads of state of Fiji
- President of Fiji
- Office of the Prime Minister
- Premier of the Kingdom of Viti
