= Samabula Tamavua (Open Constituency, Fiji) =

Former electoral constituency in Fiji

Samabula Tamavua Open is a former electoral division of Fiji, one of 25 open constituencies that were elected by universal suffrage (the remaining 46 seats, called communal constituencies, were allocated by ethnicity). Established by the 1997 Constitution, it came into being in 1999 and was used for the parliamentary elections of 1999, 2001, and 2006. It was located in the Greater Suva metropolitan area.

The 2013 Constitution promulgated by the Military-backed interim government abolished all constituencies and established a form of proportional representation, with the entire country voting as a single electorate.

== Election results ==
In the following tables, the primary vote refers to first-preference votes cast. The final vote refers to the final tally after votes for low-polling candidates have been progressively redistributed to other candidates according to pre-arranged electoral agreements (see electoral fusion), which may be customized by the voters (see instant run-off voting).

=== 1999 ===
Candidate	Political party	Votes (primary)	%	Votes (final)	%
Tupeni Baba	Fiji Labour Party (FLP)	5,361	40.38	7,750	58.37
James Raghwan Raman	National Federation Party (NFP)	4,726	35.59	5,528	41.63
Raymond Nair	Christian Democratic Alliance (VLV)	1,269	9.56	...	...
Viliame Saulekaleka Tunidau	Fijian Association Party (FAP)	1,024	7.71	...	...
Sovea Tabua	Soqosoqo ni Vakavulewa ni Taukei (SVT)	565	4.26	...	...
Peceli Vuniwa	Nationalist Vanua Tako Lavo Party (NVTLP)	333	2.99	...	...
Total		13,278	100.00	13,278	100.00

=== 2001 ===
Candidate	Political party	Votes (primary)	%	Votes (final)	%
Manoa Dobui	Soqosoqo Duavata ni Lewenivanua (SDL)	3,597	30.66	6,611	56.36
Tomasi Canuwale	Fiji Labour Party (FLP)	4,008	34.17	5,119	43.64
Tupeni Baba	New Labour Unity Party (NLUP)	1,834	15.64	...	...
Taufa Vakatale	Soqosoqo ni Vakavulewa ni Taukei (SVT)	848	7.23	...	...
James Raghwan Raman	National Federation Party (NFP)	811	6.91	...	...
Viliame Saulekaleka Tunidau	Dodonu ni Taukei (DNT)	632	5.39	...	...
Total		11,730	100.00	11,730	100.00

=== 2006 ===
Candidate	Political party	Votes (primary)	%	Votes (final)	%
Monica Raghwan	Fiji Labour Party (FLP)	5,332	40.15	7,162	53.93
Tupeni Baba	Soqosoqo Duavata ni Lewenivanua (SDL)	5,939	44.72	6,118	46.07
Filipe Bole	National Alliance Party (NAPF)	961	7.24	...	...
Pramod Rae	National Federation Party (NFP)	666	5.02	...	...
Manoa Dobui	United Peoples Party (UPP)	290	2.18	...	...
Pita Kewa Nacuva	Soqosoqo Duavata ni Lewenivanua (SDL)	92	0.69	...	...
Total		13,280	100.00	13,280	100.00

== Sources ==
- Psephos - Adam Carr's electoral archive
- Fiji Facts
