= Nadi (Open Constituency, Fiji) =

Former electoral constituency in Fiji

Nadi Open is a former electoral division of Fiji, one of 25 open constituencies that were elected by universal suffrage (the remaining 46 seats, called communal constituencies, were allocated by ethnicity). Established by the 1997 Constitution, it came into being in 1999 and was used for the parliamentary elections of 1999, 2001, and 2006. It was located in the western part of the main island of Viti Levu.

The 2013 Constitution promulgated by the Military-backed interim government abolished all constituencies and established a form of proportional representation, with the entire country voting as a single electorate.

== Election results ==
In the following tables, the primary vote refers to first-preference votes cast. The final vote refers to the final tally after votes for low-polling candidates have been progressively redistributed to other candidates according to pre-arranged electoral agreements (see electoral fusion), which may be customized by the voters (see instant run-off voting).

=== 1999 ===
1999 Fijian general election
Party	Candidate	Votes	%
Labour	Pradhuman Rainga	7,559	42.91
NFP	Manjuwati Verma	5,653	32.09
PANU	Apisai Tora	3,061	17.38
VLV	Jopeni Vatunitu	1,185	6.73
SVT	Makelesi Lutuciri	156	0.89
Two-candidate-preferred result
Labour	Pradhuman Rainga	11,773	66.84
NFP	Manjuwati Verma	5,841	33.16
Labour hold			

=== 2001 ===
2001 Fijian general election
Party	Candidate	Votes	%	±%
Labour	Krishna Prasad	6,245	42.75	−0.16
NFP	Prem Singh	3,170	21.70	−10.39
SDL	Inia Tueli	2,149	14.71	New
Bei Kai Viti	Miliakere Moce	1,230	8.42	New
New Labour Unity Party	Venkanna Chetty	814	5.57	New
Party of National Unity (Fiji)	Arthur Sowani	673	4.61	−12.77
SVT	Auvind Deo Singh	325	2.22	+1.33
Two-candidate-preferred result
NFP	Prem Singh	7,344	50.28	+17.12
Labour	Krishna Prasad	7,262	49.72	−17.12
Labour hold		Swing	-17.1	

Note: On 8 February 2002 the High Court ruled that more than a thousand votes, most of them for Prasad, had been wrongly invalidated, and awarded the seat to Prasad.

=== 2006 ===
2006 Fijian general election
Party	Candidate	Votes	%	±%
Labour	Amjad Ali	8,630	46.43	
SDL	Shyam Sundaram	5,432	29.23	
NFP	Prem Singh	2,645	14.23	
Party of National Unity (Fiji)	Kamenieli Nawaqavonovono	476	6.44	
Independent	Jeremaia Lewaravu	392	2.11	
UPP	Josephine Raikuna Williams	389	2.09	
SVT	Arvind Deo Singh	237	1.23	
Independent	Josefa Vatunitu		0.90	
Independent	Pravin Jamieson	96	0.52	
Independent	Vero Qoro	65	0.35	
Independent	Rajendra Kumar	56	0.30	
Three-candidate-preferred result
Labour	Amjad Ali	9,688	52.13	
SDL	Shyam Sundaram	6,222	29.23	
NFP	Prem Singh	2,676	14.40	
Labour hold		Swing	+2.41	

== Sources ==
- Psephos – Adam Carr's electoral archive
- Fiji Facts
