= Suva City (Open Constituency, Fiji) =

Former electoral constituency in Fiji

Suva City Open is a former electoral division of Fiji, one of 25 open constituencies that were elected by universal suffrage (the remaining 46 seats, called communal constituencies, were allocated by ethnicity). Established by the 1997 Constitution, it came into being in 1999 and was used for the parliamentary elections of 1999, 2001, and 2006. It covered the central business district of Suva City.

The 2013 Constitution promulgated by the Military-backed interim government abolished all constituencies and established a form of proportional representation, with the entire country voting as a single electorate.

== Election results ==
In the following tables, the primary vote refers to first-preference votes cast. The final vote refers to the final tally after votes for low-polling candidates have been progressively redistributed to other candidates according to pre-arranged electoral agreements (see electoral fusion), which may be customized by the voters (see instant run-off voting).

=== 1999 ===
Candidate	Political party	Votes (primary)	%	Votes (final)	%
Ofa Duncan	United General Party (UGP)	3,849	31.86	6,723	55.65
Kenneth Zinck	Fiji Labour Party (FLP)	3,590	29.72	5,357	44.35
Viliame Gonelevu	Christian Democratic Alliance (VLV)	1,510	12.50	...	...
Mataiasi Ragigia	Soqosoqo ni Vakavulewa ni Taukei (SVT)	1,040	8.61	...	...
Asenaca Bentley	Fijian Association Party (FAP)	870	7.20	...	...
Sokonibogi Francis Waqa	Nationalist Vanua Tako Lavo Party (NVTLP)	500	4.14	...	...
Meli Vakarewakobau	Independent	457	3.78	...	...
Bhavik Waghela	Independent	110	0.91	...	...
Pramod Rae	National Federation Party (NFP)	89	0.74	...	...
Prince Vyas Muni Lakshman	Coalition of Independent Nationals (COIN)	65	0.54	...	...
Total		12,080	100.00	12,080	100.00

=== 2001 ===
Candidate	Political party	Votes (primary)	%	Votes (final)	%
Ofa Duncan	New Labour Unity Party (NLUP)	1,424	12.48	6,817	59.77
Viliame Sovalatilati Volavola	Soqosoqo Duavata ni Lewenivanua (SDL)	3,642	31.93	4,459	40.23
Tanasio Naqarase	Fiji Labour Party (FLP)	3,007	26.34	...	...
Timoci Tavanavanua	Soqosoqo ni Vakavulewa ni Taukei (SVT)	1,505	13.19	...	...
Maan Singh	National Federation Party	1,018	8.93	...	...
Ropate Gabriel Sivo	Conservative Alliance (CAMV)	505	4.43	...	...
Moses Whippy	Fijian Association Party (FAP)	215	1.88	...	...
Manasa Dela Moce	Nationalist Vanua Tako Lavo Party (NVTLP)	90	0.79	...	...
Total		11,406	100.00	11,405	100.00

=== 2006 ===
Candidate	Political party	Votes (primary)	%	Votes (final)	%
Misaele Weleilakeba	Soqosoqo Duavata ni Lewenivanua (SDL)	5,705	47.39	6,135	50.96
Tom Rickets	Fiji Labour Party (FLP)	3,261	27.09	5,903	49.04
Ratu Epeli Ganilau	National Alliance Party	1,763	14.65	...	...
Attar Singh	National Federation Party (NFP)	745	6.19	...	...
Ofa Swann (née Duncan)	Independent	341	2.83	...	...
Tikotikoca Inoke Seru	United Peoples Party (UPP)	223	1.85	...	...
Total		12,038	100.00	12,038	100.00

== Sources ==
- Psephos - Adam Carr's electoral archive
- Fiji Facts
