= Attar Singh =

Fijian trade unionist of Indian descent

Attar Singh (born 1957 or 1958) is an Indo-Fijian trade unionist. From 2002 to 2018 he was General Secretary of the Fiji Islands Council of Trade Unions (FICTU), one of two major umbrella bodies for trade unions in Fiji.

Singh was educated at Labasa Sangam College. He became head of the Fiji Islands Council of Trade Unions in 2002.

Unlike many unionists in the rival Fiji Trades Union Congress (FTUC), Singh has been a harsh critic of the Republic of Fiji Military Forces, which seized power on 5 December 2006. He has attacked Commodore Frank Bainimarama, the coup leader who has since been sworn in as interim Prime Minister of Fiji. On 14 January 2007, Singh was quoted by Fiji Television as insisting that Military personnel and politicians should not participate in the Interim Government (Mahendra Chaudhry, whose Fiji Labour Party has links to the rival union group, was Minister of Finance in the Interim Government during 2007), and that the sole purpose of the interim government should be to prepare for elections, not to legislate new laws. He also condemned as "unconstitutional" the appointment of Bernadette Ganilau as Minister for Labour, according to a Fiji Television report (9 January 2007).

Singh's criticism of the Military-backed interim government provoked a hostile reaction from Commodore Bainimarama on 14 January 2007. That night, Singh was taken up to Suva's Queen Elizabeth Barracks for interrogation. Fiji Television further claimed that Singh had been taken from his Samabula home, locked in a cell, and assaulted.

== Politics ==
A member of the executive of the National Federation Party (once a major political party, but without parliamentary representation from 1999 to 2014), Singh has contested several elections on his party's ticket.

In the 1999 election (in which his party lost all of its seats in the House of Representatives), Singh was a candidate in the Laucala Indian Communal Constituency. He polled 2,510 votes, some 22.2 percent of the total.

In the parliamentary election of 2001, Singh contested the Suva City Indian Communal Constituency. His 1976 votes amounted to just under 21.8 percent of the total - less than half of what Wadan Narsey had achieved in the previous election.

He contested the 2006 parliamentary election as his party's candidate for the Suva City Open Constituency. He polled 745 votes, or 6.2 percent of the total.

He contested the 2018 election as a candidate for the National Federation Party, again stepping down from his FICTU position to do so.
