= Suva City (General Electors Communal Constituency, Fiji) =

Former electoral constituency in Fiji

Suva City General Communal is a former electoral division of Fiji, one of 3 communal constituencies reserved for General Electors, an omnibus category including Caucasians, Chinese, and all others whose ethnicity was neither indigenous Fijian nor Indo-Fijian. Established by the 1997 Constitution, it came into being in 1999 and was used for the parliamentary elections of 1999, 2001, and 2006. (Of the remaining 68 seats, 43 were reserved for other ethnic communities and 25, called Open Constituencies, were elected by universal suffrage).

The 2013 Constitution promulgated by the Military-backed interim government abolished all constituencies and established a form of proportional representation, with the entire country voting as a single electorate.

== Election results ==
In the following tables, the "primary vote" refers to first-preference votes cast. The "final vote" refers to the final tally after votes for low-polling candidates have been progressively redistributed to other candidates according to pre-arranged electoral agreements (see electoral fusion), which may be customized by the voters (see instant run-off voting).

=== 1999 ===
Candidate	Party	First preferences		Final preferences	
Candidate	Party	Votes	%	Votes	%
Bill Aull	Independent	918	30.44	1,584	52.52
Robin Storck	United General Party	1,360	45.09	1,432	47.48
Norman Lawrence Low	Fijian Association Party	577	19.13		
Edward Jennings	Coalition of Independent Nationals	161	5.34		
Total		3,016	100.00	3,016	100.00
Registered voters/turnout		3,016	–		
Independent win					

=== 2001 ===
Candidate	Party	First preferences		Final preferences	
Candidate	Party	Votes	%	Votes	%
Kenneth Zinck	New Labour Unity Party	993	35.40	1,692	60.32
Kenneth Low	Soqosoqo Duavata ni Lewenivanua	590	21.03	1,113	39.68
John Sanday	General Voters Party	429	15.29		
Wenddell Archibald	United General Party	352	12.55		
Bill Aull	Fijian Association Party	314	11.19		
Norman Lawrence Low	Soqosoqo ni Vakavulewa ni Taukei	127	4.53		
Total		2,805	100.00	2,805	100.00
Registered voters/turnout		8,742	–		
NLUP gain from independent					

=== 2006 ===
Candidate	Party	Votes	%
Bernadette Ganilau	United Peoples Party	1,458	52.13
Aca Lord	Soqosoqo Duavata ni Lewenivanua	702	25.10
Kenneth Zinck	Independent	510	18.23
Daniel Robert Johns	National Federation Party	127	4.54
Total		2,797	100.00
Registered voters/turnout		2,730	–
UPP gain from NLUP			

== Sources ==
- Psephos - Adam Carr's electoral archive
- Fiji Facts
