= Suva City (Indian Communal Constituency, Fiji) =

Former electoral constituency in Fiji

Suva City Indian Communal is a former electoral division of Fiji, one of 19 communal constituencies reserved for Indo-Fijians. Established by the 1997 Constitution, it came into being in 1999 and was used for the parliamentary elections of 1999, 2001, and 2006. (Of the remaining 52 seats, 27 were reserved for other ethnic communities and 25, called Open Constituencies, were elected by universal suffrage). The electorate covered the nucleus of Suva City, Fiji's capital.

The 2013 Constitution promulgated by the Military-backed interim government abolished all constituencies and established a form of proportional representation, with the entire country voting as a single electorate.

== Election results ==
In the following tables, the primary vote refers to first-preference votes cast. The final vote refers to the final tally after votes for low-polling candidates have been progressively redistributed to other candidates according to pre-arranged electoral agreements (see electoral fusion), which may be customized by the voters (see instant run-off voting).

=== 1999 ===
| Candidate | Political party | Votes | % |
| Deo Narain | Fiji Labour Party (FLP) | 6,549 | 56.17 |
| Wadan Lal Narsey | National Federation Party (NFP) | 5,111 | 43.87 |
| Total | | 11,660 | 100.00 |

=== 2001 ===
| Candidate | Political party | Votes | % |
| Gyani Nand | Fiji Labour Party (FLP) | 6,768 | 74.65 |
| Attar Singh | National Federation Party (NFP) | 1,976 | 21.80 |
| Nardeo Mishra | New Labour Unity Party (NLUP) | 322 | 3.55 |
| Total | | 9,066 | 100.00 |

=== 2006 ===
| Candidate | Political party | Votes | % |
| Gyani Nand | Fiji Labour Party (FLP) | 7,660 | 77.32 |
| Chandra Kant Umaria | National Federation Party (NFP) | 1,675 | 16.91 |
| Dildar Shah | National Alliance Party (NAPF) | 405 | 4.09 |
| Mohammed Salamat Ali | Soqosoqo Duavata ni Lewenivanua (SDL) | 147 | 1.48 |
| Shiu Ram | Coalition of Independent Nationals (COIN) | 20 | 0.20 |
| Total | | 9,907 | 100.00 |

== Sources ==
- Psephos - Adam Carr's electoral archive
- Fiji Facts
