= Monica Raghwan =

Fijian politician

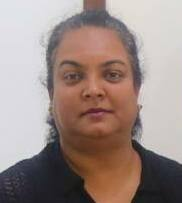
Raghwan in 2016.

Monica Raghwan is a Fijian politician. She was elected from the Samabula Tamavua Open Constituency into the House of Representatives in the 2006 elections, defeating Soqosoqo Duavata ni Lewenivanua's (SDL) star recruit, Tupeni Baba. The win also made her one of the youngest members of the House.

== Early life and education ==
Monica Raghwan was born in Suva, Fiji on 22 November 1967. Her father, Vijay Raghwan, is a builder and President of Fiji Masters Builder Association. After completing her primary education at Veiuto Primary School and secondary education at Suva Grammar School, she studied at the University of Madras, India graduating with Bachelor of Science majoring in Botany. She later studied at the University of the South Pacific, obtaining Post Graduate Diploma in Biology (Plant Breeding). She has been employed in her family business, Raghwan Construction and as a research agronomist.

== Political engagement ==
She was a candidate for the Labour Party during the last Suva City Council elections.
