= Peter Foster =

Australian fraudster (born 1962)

- Born: Peter Clarence Foster; 26 September 1962 (age 64); Queensland, Australia
- Parent(s): Louise Poletti (mother), aka Luigina Pelotti,
- Status: Under arrest (August 2020)
- Convictions: Breaches of Trade Practices Act, breaches of Trade Descriptions Act, forgery, fraud, money laundering, immigration offences, contempt of court, assaulting police officers, resisting arrest

Peter Clarence Foster (born 26 September 1962) is an Australian career criminal who has been imprisoned in Australia, United Kingdom, the United States, and Vanuatu for a variety of offences related to weight loss and other scams as well as absconding from justice. His convictions range from fraud and money laundering to contempt of court and resisting arrest.

Foster was also in the headlines for his role in helping Cherie Blair, wife of British prime minister Tony Blair, buy properties in Bristol at a discounted rate. Foster has described himself as an "international man of mischief".

== Early career ==
Foster began marketing and selling products at 19 years of age. Nicknamed "kid tycoon" and the "milkshake tycoon", Foster was promoting themed nights at a Gold Coast discothèque two years before he was legally allowed in the club and became a boxing promoter at 17.

At 20, Foster was fined by an Australian court for attempting to make a fraudulent insurance claim when a boxing match he was promoting fell through.

The following year, Foster became a television producer and filmed a documentary with Muhammad Ali while living several weeks with him in his home in Los Angeles. He was declared bankrupt after promoting an Ali bout in Australia that did not eventuate and marketing a method for quitting smoking.

Foster was also known for his relationship with model Samantha Fox, whom he hired to promote his weight loss tea. She later distanced herself from him and remarked:

I'm old enough now to know that I'd never be taken in again by the likes of Peter Foster. But then, I was 22 and impressionable. My parents had split and here was a man who was clever, manipulative and domineering. I came close to marrying him because I was so vulnerable.

— Samantha Fox, quoted in "Serial fraudster who keeps bouncing back", The Guardian, 6 December 2002

A number of years later, Foster suggested that he and Fox make a film about their lives, but she sent a refusal via her lawyer.

== Bai Lin Tea and Chow Low Tea weight loss scams ==
Muhammad Ali's third wife, model Veronica Ali, introduced him to Bai Lin tea, which Foster went on to market in Australia as an "ancient Chinese diet secret" for weight loss. The company went bankrupt while under investigation by the Australian Competition & Consumer Commission (ACCC), whereupon he took the tea to the United Kingdom, hiring Samantha Fox to promote it, and securing a deal with London football club Chelsea F.C. to promote the tea on their shirts.

Under testing, the tea was proven to be ordinary black China tea and Foster's company was fined £5,000 in 1988 for breaching the UK Trade Descriptions Act. However, Foster fled Britain to the United States where he remarketed it as Chow Low Tea. Advertisements in The New York Times and The Washington Post claimed the tea lowered the cholesterol levels of its consumers no matter what they ate. The fraudulent claims saw him convicted for conspiracy to commit grand theft and he served four months in a Los Angeles prison. Fraudulently stating that a food product could lower cholesterol was a crime.

In 1994, Foster returned to England and was fined £21,000, with £8,000 costs, in relation to the outstanding Bai Lin Tea fine. In 1996 he was imprisoned over his sales of slimming granules for conspiring to provide a product with a false description. Nine months later he absconded while on day release from open prison and returned to Australia on a false passport. The ACCC charged him with fraudulently marketing Biometrics, a "thigh contour treatment". He was fined $15,000 and compelled to sign an undertaking to desist from making statements about the therapeutic effects of the product. He was then jailed for five months on charges relating to withholding information from the Australian Securities & Investments Commission.

Foster was arrested in Australia on a British extradition warrant, but absconded on bail to be rearrested in February 1998. He spent over 18 months in prison in Brisbane fighting extradition, claiming his life would be at risk if he returned because he was an informant against corrupt prison officers. He was returned to Britain and imprisoned in 2000 for a further 33 months at St Albans Crown Court for using fraudulent documents to obtain credit for a company, Foremost Body Corporation, that sold thigh-reduction cream. Having served time on remand, Foster was released, but banned for five years from holding company directorships in the UK. Told by the judge, "the sooner you go from the country the better", Foster returned to Australia, but moved to Fiji where he became involved in politics in 2001, before resurfacing in Britain and Ireland in 2002.

== Work as police informant ==
Foster undertook undercover work for the Australian Federal Police in 1993 and 1997, wearing listening devices in meetings with known criminals as part of investigations into the trafficking of illicit drugs. Foster said in an interview that he was influenced to take part by the effect his sister's longstanding drug addiction had on his family, and that he had always been against drugs. In a comment on Foster, criminologist Rick Sarre said that confidence tricksters will often assist police so they can use it as a bargaining chip if they are caught for an offence.

== Fiji 2000–2001 ==
In 2001, in the wake of the 2000 Fijian coup d'état, Foster invested over F$1 million in the New Labour Unity Party, a breakaway group from the Fiji Labour Party (FLP). He became 2001 Fijian general election campaign director for Tupeni Baba, the former deputy prime minister, whom Foster described as the "Nelson Mandela of the South Pacific". Describing himself as a "freedom fighter for Fiji", Foster expressed concern that there could be another coup if the FLP leader and former prime minister, Mahendra Chaudhry, who had been deposed in the 2000 coup, returned to office. Laisenia Qarase and his SDL party won government.

== Cherie Blair controversy ==
=== 2002 "Cheriegate" scandal and deportation ===
Foster was investigated by the UK Department of Trade and Industry in 2002 for effectively acting as the managing director of slimming pill business Renuelle, despite being barred for five years in 2000 from holding company directorships. Former business partners, including former professional footballer Paul Walsh, accused Foster of conning them into investing £150,000 in Renuelle. At the time he was fighting deportation to Australia to face fraud charges for a separate weight loss scam.

The controversy involving Cherie Blair (sometimes known as "Cheriegate") occurred when it was revealed that Foster had assisted the wife of the then prime minister, Tony Blair, with the purchase of two flats in Bristol at a discount. The transaction came to light after Foster claimed that Walsh had threatened to expose the link with the Blairs unless he was returned the money he had invested. Walsh denied the blackmail accusation.

When the deal became public knowledge, Cherie Blair tried to distance herself from Foster and released a public statement claiming he was not involved with the purchase. The Daily Mail newspaper provided email evidence to the contrary; in one email between Blair and Foster she described him as "a star" and said, "we are on the same wave length, Peter". Blair made a public apology, blaming her "misfortune" on the pressures of running a family and being a mother.

Foster told the media that Cherie and Tony Blair at one time agreed to be godparents to the yet-to-be born child of Foster and his partner Carole Caplin, who later miscarried. He also said that he celebrated Christmas with the Blair family and was a guest at 10 Downing Street on the night of his 40th birthday, however, Blair declared in her apology she had only met him once, for less than five minutes. Foster later acknowledged that apart from one brief meeting, he had only spoken with her by phone three times and corresponded with her by email. He acknowledged Blair had not attempted to influence his deportation order from the UK. He was also covertly recorded by The Sun newspaper coaching his mother to speak to the media about a visit to 10 Downing Street on his birthday that never took place.

Foster later claimed, on his 2004 ABC TV Enough Rope appearance, that he believed his partner was pregnant with Tony Blair's child, the product of a long-standing extramarital affair. However, The Times investigated the claims and found them "a catalogue of errors and inconsistencies" and an "elaborate hoax". Carole Caplin said about Foster's claims: "This is just a new way for Peter to get attention. He is just a fantasist and these absurd stories shouldn't be given any credibility."

In a press statement during the scandal, Foster also claimed "no one has ever lost money through my enterprises" and asked "Could it be I had to be discredited by the establishment?" Journalist Malcolm Brown disputed this, writing that thousands had lost money. Three years before, in 1999, former Consumer Affairs commissioner Jan Taylor, and Foster's former sales manager James Small, described how many of Foster's victims were middle income earners who were left financially devastated by his scams.

Foster dropped his plans to fight the deportation order in the weeks following the Blair scandal and moved to Ireland.

=== Complaints to the Press Complaints Commission ===
Following a complaint to the Press Complaints Commission, The Sun newspaper was found guilty of "one of the most serious forms of physical intrusion into privacy" over taped telephone calls involving Foster during the Cheriegate scandal. The commission condemned the paper for having published transcripts of conversations between him and his mother. The commission upheld Foster's case that there was no public interest in publishing the transcripts of the conversations, contrary to the argument of the former editor.

The Sun admitted it had behaved "improperly" in covering the Press Complaints Commission findings and publishing the adjudication.

The Press Complaints Commission rejected another complaint from Foster that articles of 13, 14 and 17 December 2002 were inaccurate. The complaints about these articles were:

- That the transcripts were edited to distort the meaning of the conversations. The commission found that there was no evidence of this.
- Foster disputed the paper's claims that he had tried to sell his story to Granada Television, though the Press Complaints Commission concluded that as he had appeared to try to sell the story any inaccuracy about the company he had tried to sell the story to was not significant.
- The commission concluded that The Sun was entitled under the code to express its view that Foster had tried to "ruin" Tony Blair and that the paper had not breached the code when it had claimed on 17 December that Foster had not told the truth in a statement to the press.

== 2003 Ireland deportation ==
Foster had also spent time living with his mother in Malahide, north of Dublin, in the Republic of Ireland in 2002, selling slimming pills called TRIMit through a company called Bellethos and asking investors to buy franchise rights for €200,000. The Criminal Assets Bureau (CAB) began investigating him after Australian authorities started proceedings to freeze his assets over frauds involving slimming pills. The CAB liaised with the Serious Fraud Office to examine bank accounts to see if Foster owned them. Foster was deported from the Republic of Ireland to Australia in 2003 because of his 1996 UK conviction for fraud.

== Activity in Australia 2003 to 2006 ==
=== Chaste Corporation and 2005 penalties ===
On Foster's return from Ireland in 2003, the ACCC moved to freeze his assets and seize his passport over an investigation into the Chaste Corporation and its sale of bogus TRIMit weight loss pills. The company hid Foster's involvement, and its advertising claimed the pills were 700% more effective than their rivals. Foster's business partner, Barrister, Sean Cousins, promoted the pills, kept silent on Foster's involvement in the business and the fact he knew the pills did not work. The scam netted at least $1 million from 70 people who paid up to $42,000 each for the rights to distribute the pills.

In September 2005, Foster and Chaste Corporation were fined by the Federal Court for price fixing as well as misleading and deceptive conduct. Foster was also banned for five years from being involved directly or indirectly in any cosmetic, health industry-related or weight-loss business. In 2006, the Federal Court dismissed Foster's appeal against the five-year ban and ordered him to pay the ACCC's court costs. In 2009, Cousins was struck off as a legal practitioner over his role in the scam.

=== Autobiography ===
In 2003, The Sun-Herald reported that Foster had sold his memoirs to a British publisher for $1.2 million and that they would be published in eight weeks. As of 2009, the book remained unpublished. Foster announced that he was planning to make a motion picture out of his career provided his original publishers released him from their agreement.

=== Complaints to Australian Press Council ===
In 2003, Foster complained to the Australian Press Council about articles that appeared in The Courier-Mail on 10, 11 and 12 March. He complained that the articles said he had "fleeced" or "duped" investors. The APC noted that although the Courier-Mail was "extremely tardy" in its response to complaints from Foster, the paper published a clarification on its letters page on 7 October 2003 and agreed to make a note of the clarification on its online copies.

In a second complaint, Foster objected to the same paper referring to him as a "convicted conman" in items published on 4 and 29 July 2003. The Press Council noted that Foster had himself offered evidence of convictions dating back to 1982, resulting in a substantial fine and four separate periods of imprisonment. After complaints to the paper, it published a statement on 6 October 2003 that it had asked its staff to not refer to Foster by that phrase.

Foster made a separate complaint about an article in The Sydney Morning Herald of 22 August 2003 which had referred to him as a "fraudster". He challenged the use of the word using the definition of fraud in the Macquarie Dictionary, but the Press Council found that the word "fraudster" had been used accurately and dismissed his complaint.

=== Enough Rope interview ===
Foster appeared on the Australian Broadcasting Corporation interview program Enough Rope in 2004. A new edit of that interview was broadcast in 2007. On the program he claimed that he had not committed any offences since 1994. Interviewer Andrew Denton, however, cited convictions after that date, including for travelling on a false passport, resisting arrest and assaulting police officers. Foster also denied he was a fraudster, claiming, "I've never stolen a cent in my life" and that he does not lie. Denton commented that lying is not a habit for white collar criminals, but a business, and that Foster is "ultimately in the business of selling himself". Foster said he was ashamed of his conman title and "only a fool would enjoy the publicity I get".

== Fiji arrest 2006 ==
Late 2005, Foster returned to Fiji, gaining entry to the country and obtaining a work permit using a forged police clearance certificate to conceal his criminal record. He reportedly gained a lease on waterfront property at Champagne Beach, in the Yasawa Islands, and sought investors to develop a resort.

Foster had again involved himself in local politics, offering financial support to the ruling SDL party for the successful 2006 re-election. However, he switched his support when the Qarase government was usurped in the Bainimarama military coup. Foster approached the military and offered to covertly obtain evidence that the Qarase regime had been corrupt. On 2 January 2007, the military released what it said was a secretly obtained video of a restaurant conversation between Foster and Navitalai Naisoro, the electoral strategist of the SDL party. Naisoro told Foster that the 2006 elections were rigged, with cooperation from certain elements of the police. Several Cabinet Ministers were implicated, but ousted prime minister Qarase angrily denied the claims. He suggested that the conversation recorded on video could have been staged, and another official suggested the recording had been "spliced".

In October 2006, Fijian police rejected Foster's offer to leave the country if they dropped immigration violation charges over the use of forged documents. After evading arrest for three weeks, Foster stripped to his underpants and jumped into a river to escape police and sustained a head injury from hitting his head on the propeller of a boat. Foster, however, claimed police had assaulted him and went on a hunger strike in hospital demanding the police investigate the brutality of his arrest. His doctor remarked that the injuries were consistent with having hit his head on the boat, in accord with the police account.

Foster pleaded not guilty in Suva Magistrates Court on charges of forgery, uttering forged documents and obtaining a work permit on forged documents and bailed. He was also questioned over obtaining loans from the Federated States of Micronesia using lease documents from Fiji and impersonating a rival developer to discredit a resort development at Champagne Beach. He allegedly created false websites suggesting the rival resort would be a haven for pedophiles.

In December, Foster made a bid to have his bail conditions changed so he could move from house arrest at a Suva hotel to his home on Denarau Island, but Fiji's Department of Public Prosecutions applied for him to be remanded in custody. Foster tendered an affidavit by former Australian Federal Police (AFP) officer, Ian Eriksson, that he had worked as an informant for the AFP during the 1990s. Two other affidavits were submitted from former solicitors to convince the court that Foster would not be a flight risk if he were allowed to move to house arrest in his home. A local singer provided a $5000 surety. However, he had checked out of the hotel where he had been ordered to stay as per his bail conditions and failed to appear in court twice. In mobile phone communications with the media, he insisted he was not on the run and was under the protection of Fiji's military Government since he had taped members of the ousted government admitting the last election had been rigged. However, AFP investigations showed that Foster was actually on his way to Vanuatu, deceiving police and the media by using a satellite phone.

== Vanuatu arrest 2007 ==
Foster had skipped bail while under house arrest in Fiji and entered Vanuatu by boat. He was seen wading ashore on 8 January and apprehended by Vanuatu police on 14 January after failing to appear in court in Fiji on fraud charges. He was arrested for illegal entry to the country. On arrest, Foster claimed to be ill, but a doctor declared that he was well and fit to appear in court. He was sentenced to six weeks imprisonment, the sentence was backdated to the date of his arrest and he was fined 120,000 vatu (A$1,400). He was released from jail on 4 February after serving three weeks. Foster reached a deal with the Vanuatu government and was deported to Australia, in spite of being wanted for separate fraud charges in Fiji and Micronesia. He told the media, "I go from one catastrophe to another, I don't know how I do it...I'm going to have to learn eventually, I suppose."

== Activity in Australia from 2007 ==
=== 2007 conviction in Australia ===
Deported from Vanuatu, Foster was charged on arrival in Australia and pleaded guilty to fraud and money laundering charges over the forgery of documents to fraudulently gain a $US300,000 loan from the Bank of the Federated States of Micronesia. He had transferred some of the funds illegally into Australian bank accounts. Foster claimed that he had taken out the loan to develop a tourist resort on Yasawa Island, but the court found he had transferred funds from the loan account to pay his girlfriend's rent on her Gold Coast home, repay credit card debts and channel funds into family related businesses. He was released on parole at the start of May 2009 after serving eighteen months of a four-and-a-half-year sentence.

=== 2009 Australian legal actions ===
In May 2009, Foster began civil proceedings for damages against Associated Newspapers and a former lawyer. Both applications were dismissed when the judge found Foster, who was representing himself, had failed to serve either defendant, thus obliging Foster to pay A$10,000 in costs.

=== 2011 arrest in Australia ===
On 18 November 2011, Foster was arrested by Australian Federal Police officers and Australian Competition & Consumer Commission officials in relation to diet spray company SensaSlim Australia for misleading and deceptive conduct in breach of the Trade Practices Act. The Therapeutic Goods Administration banned the sale of SensaSlim with effect from 1 December 2011 for advertising breaches. He was released on A$125,000 bail in December 2011. The judge noted that Foster had complied with bail conditions since being released in 2009, was close to his sick mother and that she would benefit from him looking after her.

In September 2012 he claimed in court that his only involvement with Sensaslim was to allow a promotional video to be filmed in his house, but denied being involved with production of the DVD. The Australian Competition & Consumer Commission claimed that Foster assumed false identities while operating the scam, using the moniker IMOM, or "International Man of Mischief", in a table charting the development of the business and also to denote his own number in his mobile phone. Foster denied creating the table and claimed that the nickname referred to a former business partner. He was charged with contempt of court for breaching the 2005 Federal Court order banning him from taking part in the weight-loss industry.

=== 2012 legal action ===
In January 2012, Foster took out a restraining order against a Gold Coast sports betting scheme proprietor, Philip Cropper, under the Peace and Good Behaviour Act. His solicitor asked the magistrate to regard a summons as having been served after having difficulties serving it, but the magistrate urged that further attempts should be made. Foster accused Philip Cropper of attempted blackmail, but withdrew the complaints in June.

=== 2013 contempt of court conviction and disappearance ===
In 2013 the Federal court of Australia found Foster in contempt of court for his involvement with SensaSlim while still under the court ordered ban obtained against him in 2005. He was sentenced to three years imprisonment but failed to appear and was sentenced in absentia.

Foster claimed he would be provided with a Fiji protection visa if he could get an outstanding arrest warrant lifted. He sent photos of himself holding a Fijian national news broadsheet to a Sydney newspaper to give the impression that he had fled to Fiji. Local police denied they had been asked for help in apprehending him by Australian police. The notion that Foster would return to Fiji where he still had 2006 charges pending over the forgery of documents was greeted with scepticism there. He issued an appeal against the jail sentence for contempt while in hiding.

On 14 February 2014, an Interpol Alert was issued for Foster for extradition to Australia to face contempt of court charges. Later it was found Foster had falsely purported to have been in Fiji from the time he absconded until his arrest in October 2014.

=== 2014 arrest and connection with Sports Trading Club ===
Foster was arrested near Byron Bay in New South Wales on 28 October 2014. He pleaded guilty to assaulting police and resisting arrest during the raid and was extradited to Queensland to serve a minimum of 18 months for the contempt of court conviction. Footage from the arrest showed he was operating sports betting scheme, Sports Trading Club, under the alias Mark Hughes. The company was owned by a Hong Kong company under his niece, Arabella Foster's, name. By late 2014, the Queensland Office of Fair Trading had received almost 400 complaints about Sports Trading Club, which claimed to have made a 1350% profit over eight months.

Foster was granted conditional early release six months before the end of his sentence in October 2015. The reasons for the release were redacted from the ruling due to a claim that publication would place Foster at an unspecified risk.

Foster's former lawyer and business partner Sean Cousins said of his former client's release that Foster "had mastered the art of escaping jail by becoming a prison informant".

In December 2015 it was reported that Foster had forged the signature of a Queensland Justice of the peace on a sworn affidavit. The lawyer acting for victims became suspicious that the JPs name was misspelt and after tracking down a JP with the same registration number and similar name, provided the court with an attestation that the signature on the affidavit was not that of the JP in question.

=== 2015 police investigation ===
In December 2015 Australian police began investigating allegations that Foster had tried to hire a hitman to kill private investigator Ken Gamble. Gamble had reportedly discovered proceeds from Fosters' most recent crime. The home of Fosters' mother and a property in Byron Bay had been raided and phones seized, but there were no indications that Foster's mother played a part. Foster had not commented by the end of December and police declined to comment as it was an ongoing investigation.

=== 2016 fine and ban ===
In May 2016 Foster was fined AU$660,000 and permanently banned from being a company director or having any business in the diet or health industry as a result of his involvement in SensaSlim. SensaSlim was fined a total of AU$3.55m. Fosters' involvement was carefully concealed from investors. He was behind the invention of a non-existent Swiss research institute, Institut de Recherche Intercontinental, which it was falsely claimed was conducting a large worldwide trial into the efficacy of SensaSlim. The court found that SensaSlim directors had concealed Fosters' involvement in the scheme, knowing that his reputation as a conman would put people off SensaSlim. Federal Court Justice David Yates described Foster as "beyond redemption". Justice Yates also said "He preys on the right-mindedness of others to cheat and deceive. In the present case, he lurked behind SensaSlim precisely for that purpose".

=== 2016 racehorse investigation ===
In December 2016, it was announced that the horse Azkadellia, winner of the 2016 Queen of the Turf Stakes, would be stripped of A$1.5 million in prize money.

The mare had been bought from Ciaron Maher Racing in 2014 for A$280,000 with money from Foster's failed online betting company Sports Trading Company. The horse was registered in the name of Arabella Racing Pty Ltd, formerly owned by a Hong Kong company controlled by Foster's niece, Arabella Foster. On 31 August 2014, she completed a declaration that Arabella Racing Pty Ltd owned the horse, though there were suspicions that she was providing a front for her uncle.

Ownership of Arabella Racing Pty Ltd was transferred to a Canadian, Thomas Sebastian Cain, who in February 2015 completed a transfer-of-ownership form, declaring to racing authorities that he was the new owner of Azkadellia. He did not declare that he was formerly known as Matthew Thomas Reed and has been sentenced to 12 years imprisonment in 2007 for smuggling cocaine and ecstasy tablets worth A$211 million into Queensland from British Columbia.

On 25 August 2015, Cain completed a transfer of ownership to Ben Connolly, who bought the horse for A$60,000. Private investigator Ken Gamble described the sale as a "deliberate and covert attempt to deceive Racing Victoria and to conceal Foster's beneficial interest in the racehorse". After Gamble met with Racing Victoria in September 2016, the latter reopened an investigation into the bona fides of Azkadellia, banning the horse from racing until stewards completed their inquiry.

=== 2017 arrest ===
On 10 February 2017, Foster was arrested on the Gold Coast for "fraud related issues". He was then extradited to New South Wales over his alleged involvement in a 2013 sports betting scam. On 14 February the matter was mentioned, then adjourned, at Waverley Local Court. The charges were connected to his 2014 Sports Trading Club arrest. In March he was refused bail on the grounds that he posed an unacceptable flight risk; this was confirmed by the Supreme Court on 27 July 2017.

=== 2018 bankruptcy ===
In January 2018 Foster was declared bankrupt after failing to pay the ACCC $53,714 in costs.

=== 2018 ordered to testify in murder case ===
In February 2018 a Brisbane magistrate ordered Foster to testify in the murder case against John Chardon, who was accused of murdering his wife, Novy Chardon. Foster claimed that John Chardon had confessed to shooting Novy in the back because she planned to divorce him. Chardon's lawyer did not fight the order.

In May 2018 Foster claimed that John Chardon had confessed to shooting his wife and weighing down her body to dispose of it by allowing the outgoing tide to pull it out into Southport Seaway.

=== 2020 and 2021 arrests ===
On 20 August 2020, Foster was arrested in Port Douglas on alleged links to an international sports trading scam. In May 2021, an arrest warrant was issued for Foster after he failed to attend court at the Downing Centre. On 7 December 2021 Foster was again arrested in Victoria.

=== 2022 bail ===
In May 2022 Foster was granted bail after being charged with defrauding a pilot from Hong Kong of about two million Australian dollars' worth of Bitcoin. The conditions of his bail are that he is to reside with his sister, travel no further than 50 km from his address and wear an ankle tracker.

== See also ==
- Greene v Associated Newspapers Ltd
