= Gyani Nand =

Fijian politician

Member of House of Representatives (Fiji) Suva City Indian Communal Constituency
- In office 2001–2006
- Preceded by: Deo Narain
- Succeeded by: vacant

Personal details
- Born: 1943 Tavua, Fiji
- Died: 23 July 2007 (aged 63–64) Suva, Fiji
- Party: Fiji Labour Party
- Profession: Teacher, Diplomat

Gyani Nand (1943 – 23 July 2007) was a Fijian politician of Indian descent. He was born in Tavua and taught in a number of primary and high schools then worked as a hansard reporter and later as a diplomat in Australia and England before starting his political career.

In the House of Representatives he represented the Suva City Indian Communal Constituency, one of 19 reserved for Indo-Fijians, which he held for the Fiji Labour Party (FLP) in the parliamentary elections of 2001 with almost 75 percent of the vote. In the parliamentary election held on 6–13 May 2006, he again won, this time with over 77 percent, and was subsequently named Minister for Agriculture in the multi-party Cabinet that was formed.

The FLP members of the Cabinet were advised by its leader, Mahendra Chaudhry, to vote against the 2007 budget but Nand was absent during voting. Chaudhry threatened those not voting against the budget with disciplinary action but the 2006 coup took place before any action could be taken.

Nand died at the Suva Private Hospital early on 23 July 2007 after a short illness.
