= Deo Narain =

Fijian politician

Member of House of Representatives (Fiji) Suva City Indian Communal Constituency
- In office 1999–2000
- Succeeded by: Gyani Nand

Personal details
- Born: 28-09-1938 Nadroga
- Died: 15-01-2025 Suva
- Party: Fiji Labour Party

Deo Narain is a Fiji Indian politician who won the Suva City Indian Communal Constituency, one of the 19 seats reserved for Fiji citizens of Indian origin, for the Fiji Labour Party during the 1999 elections for the House of Representatives.

On 19 May 2000, he was among the 43 members of the People's Coalition Government, led by Mahendra Chaudhry, taken hostage by George Speight and his band of rebel Republic of Fiji Military Forces (RFMF) soldiers from the Counter Revolutionary Warfare Unit. He was released on 13 July 2000 after 56 days of captivity.
