= Fiji Islands Council of Trade Unions =

Former Fijian trade union organisation

FICTU
- Fiji Islands Council of Trade Unions
- Founded: August 2002
- Dissolved: October 2018
- Headquarters: Suva, Fiji
- Location: Fiji
- Key people: Maika Namudu, president Attar Singh, general secretary

The Fiji Islands Council of Trade Unions (FICTU) was a trade union organisation established in August 2002 as a breakaway from and rival to the Fiji Trades Union Congress (FTUC).

Fifteen unions, which were formerly affiliated to the FTUC, initially joined the new umbrella organisation. The move followed the unions' disatissfaction with the FTUC led by Felix Anthony, which they saw as too closely linked with the Labour Party. The FICTU was led by Maika Namudu, of the Fijian Teachers Association, as president and Attar Singh, of the Fiji Aviation Workers Association, as general secretary. Namudu stated that the organisation was not politically motivated but former minister for Labour Kenneth Zinck, described the new trade union body as a breath of fresh air for workers in the country.

The FICTU rejoined the FTUC on 27 October 2018.
