= Ofa Swann =

Fijian lawyer and politician

Member of the Fijian Parliament for Suva City
- In office 15 May 1999 – 13 May 2006

Personal details
- Born: Vanua Balavu, Fiji
- Party: United General Party; New Labour Unity Party

Ofakilomaloma Swann, also known as Ofa Duncan, is a Fijian lawyer, academic, and former politician. She served in the House of Representatives of Fiji from 1999 to 2006, and was leader of the New Labour Unity Party.

Swann is from Vanua Balavu in the Lau Islands. She was elected to represent the Suva City Open Constituency in the House of Representatives in 1999 as a candidate of the United General Party (now the United People's Party), garnering 31.9% of the vote on the first count, and 56.2% after votes for minor candidates had been redistributed under Fiji's transferable voting system. She retained the seat in 2001 as a candidate of the newly formed New Labour Unity Party (NLUP); this time the electorate was much more fractured and she polled only 12.5% of first-preference votes, but finished with 59.8% after the final distribution of preferences. She was subsequently elected Deputy Leader of the Opposition. When Kenneth Zinck, the only other NLUP MP, defied orders from the party and joined the government, Swann remained a member of the Opposition.

Following the collapse of the NLUP she contested the 2006 election as an independent. Running against several nationally known candidates, Swann was defeated, polling only 341 votes out of more than 12,000.

Following the 2006 Fijian coup d'état Swann was removed from her position on the board of the Civil Aviation Authority of Fiji by the military regime. She subsequently studied for a Master's degree in Psychology at the University of the South Pacific, and then worked there as a lecturer.

In February 2023 she was appointed to the council of Fiji National University.
