= Prem Singh (Fijian politician) =

Fijian politician

The Honourable Prem Singh
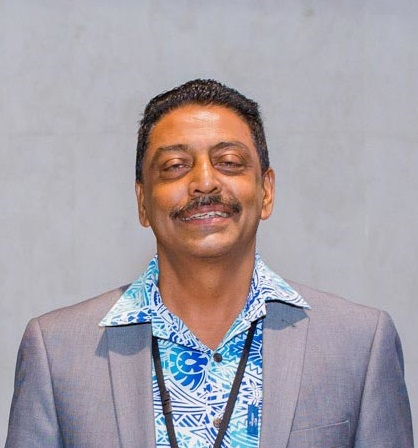

Leader of the Opposition
- In office October 2001 – September 2002
- Prime Minister: Laisenia Qarase
- Preceded by: Ratu Inoke Kubuabola
- Succeeded by: Mick Beddoes

Member of the Fijian Parliament for NFP List
- In office 17 September 2014 – 14 November 2018

Member of the Fijian Parliament for Nadi
- In office September 2001 – August 2002

Prem Singh is an Indo-Fijian politician and a former member of the Fijian Parliament. He is a member of the National Federation Party (NFP).

Singh was educated in Fiji and at Wellington Polytechnic in New Zealand. He served three terms on the Nadi town council, and was deputy mayor from 1999 to 2001. He is a founding member of the Fiji Cane Growers Association.

Singh contested the 2001 election for the NFP, winning the Nadi Open constituency and becoming the only member of his party to win a seat in the House of Representatives of Fiji. He was subsequently appointed Leader of the Opposition, after Fiji Labour Party leader Mahendra Chaudhry declined the office. In February 2002 he lost his seat after an election petition. Singh appealed this decision to the Supreme Court which ruled that even though the ruling was incorrect, the Constitution did not allow for the appeal of a Court of Disputed Returns ruling. He was replaced as Leader of the Opposition by Mick Beddoes.

Singh was re-elected to Parliament in the 2014 election, winning 1125 votes.

In September 2016 the High Court found that Singh had violated the Political Parties (Registration, Conduct, Funding and Disclosures) Decree 2013 by under declaring value of estate held in Nadi. The finding was later upheld by the Court of Appeal, and referred to the Fiji Independent Commission Against Corruption.

Singh gained only 926 votes in the 2018 election and was not re-elected. He contested the 2022 election, winning 642 votes, but again missed out on re-election.

Preceded by Inoke Kubuabola	Leader of the Opposition; 2001–2002	Succeeded by Mick Beddoes
