= Greene v Associated Newspapers Ltd =

UK ruling on defamation cases

- Court: Court of Appeal of England and Wales
- Full case name: Martha Greene v Associated Newspapers Ltd
- Decided: 5 November 2004
- Citation: [2004] EWCA Civ 1462
- Transcript: transcript at BAILII

Case history
- Prior action: High Court of Justice (Queen's Bench Division) [2004] EWHC 2322

Court membership
- Judges sitting: May, Dyson and Brooke LJJ

Case opinions
- Brooke LJ

Keywords
- confidentiality, injunction,

Greene v Associated Newspapers Ltd [2004] EWCA Civ 1462 is a case of the Court of Appeal of England and Wales that governs the use of injunctions against publication in alleged defamation cases. Greene, a businesswoman, sought an injunction against Associated Newspapers Ltd to prevent them publishing alleged links with Peter Foster; while they claimed to have emails showing links, she asserted that they were false. The test at the time for a preliminary injunction in defamation cases was Bonnard v Perryman, where it was established that the applicant has to show "a real prospect of success" at trial. The Human Rights Act 1998 established that judges should consider whether applicants are "more likely than not" to succeed at trial, a test applied to confidentiality cases in Cream Holdings Ltd v Banerjee and the Liverpool Post and Echo Ltd. Greene claimed that the Cream test should be applied rather than the Bonnard test.

The case first went to the High Court of Justice, where it was heard by Fulford J; he decided that he did not have the authority to overrule Bonnard, and passed the case on to the Court of Appeal after granting a temporary injunction. In the Court of Appeal, the case was heard by May, Dyson and Brooke LJJ, with Brooke delivering the judgment on 5 November 2004. In it, Brooke judged that defamation, the subject of Greene, was significantly different from breach of confidentiality, the subject in Cream. While the damage from a breach of confidentiality can never be undone, justifying a simple test for issuing injunctions, a defamation case that is won vindicates the injured party. Making it easier to grant injunctions in defamation cases would damage the delicate balance between freedom of the press and the right to privacy; as such, despite the Human Rights Act, Bonnard is still a valid test.

== Background ==
Martha Greene, a businesswoman, sought an injunction against Associated Newspapers Ltd to prevent them publishing allegations that she was linked to Peter Foster, a convicted fraudster. Associated Newspapers claimed they had emails proving the link, and wanted to rely on a defence of fair comment and justification; Green asserted that the emails were fakes. At the time, the law on injunctions was governed by two cases; Bonnard v Perryman and Cream Holdings Ltd v Banerjee and the Liverpool Post and Echo Ltd. Bonnard established that "The right of free speech is one which it is for the public interest that individuals should posses, and indeed, that they should exercise without impediment, so long as no wrongful act is done … Until it is clear that an alleged libel is untrue, it is not clear that any right at all has been infringed; and the importance of leaving free speech unfettered is a strong reason in cases of libel for dealing most cautiously and warily with the granting of interim injunctions", telling courts that injunctions in libel cases should only be granted if there is "a real prospect of success" at trial.

The Human Rights Act 1998, which came into force in 2000, brought the European Convention on Human Rights into British domestic law. Article 8 of the convention covers "the right to respect for private and family life", and during the passage of the Act through Parliament, elements of the press were concerned that this could affect their freedom of expression. As such, Section 12 of the Act provides that, if a court is considering whether to grant relief which infringes on the right to freedom of expression (such as an injunction), it must "have particular regard to the importance of the Convention right to freedom of expression", although recognising the other limits put on this right. Where a relief (such as an injunction) is granted in the absence of the respondent, the court must be satisfied that the claimant has taken all reasonable steps to ensure that the defendant was notified, unless there are compelling reasons why they should not be. The court must also not grant relief that would restrict publication before trial, unless satisfied that it is "more likely than not" that the trial will establish that publication should not be allowed.

As a result of the Act, it was uncertain what test to use; was "a real prospect of success" at trial acceptable, or the easier test of "more likely than not" to succeed at trial? In Cream the House of Lords decided that "a real prospect of success" was still valid law, but that from then on the test of "more likely than not" should be applied. Following on from this ruling, Greene argued that the Bonnard test was now invalid, and that the case should be judged under the Human Rights Act and Cream.

== Court proceedings ==
The case first went before Fulford J in the Queen's Bench Division of the High Court of Justice, with Fulford's judgment delivered on 16 October 2004. In it, he held that the High Court was bound to apply Bonnard v Perryman, but granted an injunction until such time as a more senior court could determine Bonnard's status. The case then went to the Court of Appeal of England and Wales, where it was heard by May, Dyson and Brooke LJJ; Brooke delivered a judgment for the entire court on 5 November 2004. In it, the court refused to extend the "more likely or not" test found in the Human Rights Act 1998 to cover defamation as well as breach of confidentiality (the subject of the Cream case). While Brooke noted that the Bonnard test was inflexible, he also considered the distinction between defamation and breach of confidentiality; while "confidentiality, once breached, is lost for ever", if a defamatory statement is taken to trial and the claimant wins, he or she is vindicated and suffers no lasting harm. As such, the Cream test should not be applied, because it would violate the delicate balance between the right to privacy and the freedom of the press.

== Bibliography ==
- Cheney, Deborah (1999). Criminal Justice and the Human Rights Act 1998. Jordans. ISBN 0-85308-504-8.
- Foster, Steve (2004). "Freedom of expression, prior restraint and section 12 of the Human Rights Act 1998". Coventry Law Journal. 9 (2).
- Hatzis, Nicholas (2006). "Libel, justification and injunctive relief under the Human Rights Act". Civil Justice Quarterly. 25: 27–31.
- Wadham, John (2007). Blackstone's Guide to the Human Rights Act 1998 (4th ed.). Oxford University Press. ISBN 978-0-19-929957-7.
