= Serua Navosa (Open Constituency, Fiji) =

Former electoral division of Fiji

Serua Navosa Open is a former electoral division of Fiji, one of 25 open constituencies that were elected by universal suffrage (the remaining 46 seats, called communal constituencies, were allocated by ethnicity). Established by the 1997 Constitution, it came into being in 1999 and was used for the parliamentary elections of 1999, 2001, and 2006. It was located in central and southern areas of the main island of Viti Levu

The 2013 Constitution promulgated by the Military-backed interim government abolished all constituencies and established a form of proportional representation, with the entire country voting as a single electorate.

== Election results ==
In the following tables, the primary vote refers to first-preference votes cast. The final vote refers to the final tally after votes for low-polling candidates have been progressively redistributed to other candidates according to pre-arranged electoral agreements (see electoral fusion), which may be customized by the voters (see instant run-off voting).

=== 1999 ===
| Candidate | Political party | Votes (primary) | % | Votes (final) | % |
| Adi Kuini Speed | Fijian Association Party (FAP) | 7,686 | 47.47 | 9,207 | 56.87 |
| Mesulame Narawa | Soqosoqo ni Vakavulewa ni Taukei (SVT) | 4,535 | 28.01 | 4,737 | 29.26 |
| Jona Rokowai | Nationalist Vanua Tako Lavo Party (NVTLP) | 1,238 | 7.65 | 2,246 | 13.87 |
| Pio Wong | Independent | 1,377 | 8.51 | ... | ... |
| Isaia Gonewai | Christian Democratic Alliance (VLV) | 1,010 | 6.24 | ... | ... |
| Benjamin Wise | United General Party (UGP) | 344 | 2.12 | ... | ... |
| Total | | 16,190 | 100.00 | 16,190 | 100.00 |

=== 2001 ===
| Candidate | Political party | Votes (primary) | % | Votes (final) | % |
| Pio Wong | Soqosoqo Duavata ni Lewenivanua (SDL) | 4,822 | 33.86 | 7,291 | 51.94 |
| Viliame Katia | Fiji Labour Party (FLP) | 3,618 | 25.40 | 4,040 | 28.37 |
| Adi Kuini Speed | Fijian Association Party (FAP) | 2,856 | 20.05 | 2,911 | 20.44 |
| Setefano Nauqe | Protector of Fiji (BKV) | 1,023 | 7.18 | ... | ... |
| Apenisa Maiyale | Conservative Alliance (CAMV) | 1,008 | 7.08 | ... | ... |
| Josateki Nasova | Soqosoqo ni Vakavulewa ni Taukei (SVT) | 503 | 3.53 | ... | ... |
| Solomoni Kunawaqe | Independent | 411 | 2.89 | ... | ... |
| Total | | 14,242 | 100.00 | 14,242 | 100.00 |

=== 2006 ===
| Candidate | Political party | Votes (primary) | % | Votes (final) | % |
| Jone Navakamocea | Soqosoqo Duavata ni Lewenivanua (SDL) | 8,537 | 48.01 | 10,143 | 57.04 |
| Peniasi Lavava Dakua | Fiji Labour Party (FLP) | 6,318 | 35.53 | 7,638 | 42.96 |
| Pio Wong | Independent | 1,005 | 5.65 | ... | ... |
| William McGoon | National Federation Party (NFP) | 938 | 5.28 | ... | ... |
| Jona Rokowai | Nationalist Vanua Tako Lavo Party (NVTLP) | 433 | 2.44 | ... | ... |
| Viliame Bale | National Alliance Party (NAPF) | 346 | 1.95 | ... | ... |
| Atunaisa Lacabuka Rasoki | National Democratic Party (NDP) | 123 | 0.69 | ... | ... |
| Anisi Dau Bati | Independent | 81 | 0.46 | ... | ... |
| Total | | 17,781 | 100.00 | 17,781 | 100.00 |
