= Manoa Dobui =

Fijian politician

Manoa Dobui is a former Fijian politician, who won the Samabula Tamavua Open Constituency in the House of Representatives for the Soqosoqo Duavata ni Lewenivanua (SDL) in the parliamentary election of 2001. He hails from Kabara in Lau.

In the previous election of 1999, he unsuccessfully contested the Lautoka City Open Constituency for the Christian Democratic Alliance (VLV).

The SDL decided not to renominate Dobui for the general election scheduled for 6–13 May 2006. Former Fiji Labour Party (FLP) Cabinet Minister Tupeni Baba was nominated in his stead, and Dobui announced on 24 March that he was joining the United Peoples Party (UPP) and would contest his constituency under the UPP banner. His bid was unsuccessful, attracting only 290 votes out of more than 13,000 cast.
