= Timeline of the 2000 Fijian coup d'état =

- Timeline (2000-2001)
  - May: 19, 20, 26, 27, 29, 30.
  - June: 7, 20.
  - July: 4, 6, 7, 9, 12, 13, 27.
  - November: 2, 15
  - March 2001

== May 19, 2000 ==
- A group led by George Speight takes Prime Minister Mahendra Chaudhry and others hostage in the Parliament building of Fiji in Suva.
- Speight names Timoci Silatolu interim Prime Minister.
- The President, Ratu Sir Kamisese Mara, denounces the coup, and declares a state of emergency.

== May 20, 2000 ==
- The military and police pledge loyalty to Mara.

== May 26, 2000 ==
- Fifteen soldiers and two officers defect to the coup.

== May 27, 2000 ==
- The rebels try to break the siege. Gunfire is exchanged.
- President Mara dismisses Mahendra Chaudhry and appoints Ratu Tevita Momoedonu as Prime Minister in his place. Momoedonu holds office for only a few minutes: he is appointed in order to "advise" the President to assume emergency powers, something that Chaudhry, in captivity, is unable to do. Mara claims to be following the Great Council of Chiefs. Mara offers Speight a pardon, which Speight rejects. (Mara later accused the Great Council of Chiefs of deception: according to him, they had lost confidence in him also, although that did not become apparent until two days later).

== May 29, 2000 ==
- Commodore Frank Bainimarama declares himself head of an Interim Military Government, with the claimed backing of the previous president, and declares martial law. (In an interview on 29 April of the following year, deposed President Mara denied that he had given Bainimarama his support. His resignation had been, he said, extorted from him, following his refusal of their request to abrogate the constitution).

== May 30, 2000 ==
- Bainimarama revokes the 1997 constitution and names Ratu Epeli Nailatikau interim Prime Minister. After opposition from Speight, he withdraws the nomination on 31 May.

== June 7, 2000 ==
- Fiji is suspended from the Commonwealth of Nations.

== June 20, 2000 ==
- Speight rejects an ultimatum demanding he sign an accord.

== July 4, 2000 ==
- Laisenia Qarase made interim Prime Minister.

== July 6, 2000 ==
- Rebels cut off Suva's power supply.

== July 7, 2000 ==
- Rebels overrun the Sukunaivalu Barracks in Labasa, on the northern island of Vanua Levu (see Mutinies of the 2000 Fijian coup d'état)
- Gunfire between rebels and military in Suva

== July 9, 2000 ==
- Speight and the military sign an accord.
- There is rioting in Levuka

== July 12, 2000 ==
- Speight's group release 9 hostages.

== July 13, 2000 ==
- Chaudhry and the other hostages are released. Ratu Josefa Iloilo named as interim President. Ratu Jope Seniloli is Vice-President.

== July 27, 2000 ==
- Speight is arrested in contravention of an earlier accord granting him immunity from prosecution, an accord agreed to by the military, according to Bainimarama, only "under duress."

== November 2, 2000 ==
- A failed mutiny at Suva's Queen Elizabeth Barracks leaves four loyal soldiers dead. Four rebels are subsequently beaten to death.

== November 15, 2000 ==
- The High Court declares the interim government to be illegal, orders the reinstatement of the 1997 Constitution, of Mara as President and of the Chaudhry government. Mara resigns, backdating his resignation to 29 May. The government appeals the ruling.

== March 1, 2001 ==
- The Court of Appeal upholds the High Court ruling reinstating the constitution.

== Bibliography ==
- Trnka, S. (2011). State of Suffering: Political Violence and Community Survival in Fiji. United States: Cornell University Press., ISBN 9780801461880 Read
- Pretes, M. (2008). Coup: Reflections on the Political Crisis in Fiji. United States: ANU E Press., ISBN 9781921536373 Read
- Baba, T., Nabobo-Baba, U., Field, M. (2005). Speight of Violence: Inside Fiji's 2000 Coup. Australia: Pandanus Books., ISBN 9781740761703 Read
