= Kuini Speed =

Fijian chief and politician

Adi Kuini Speed
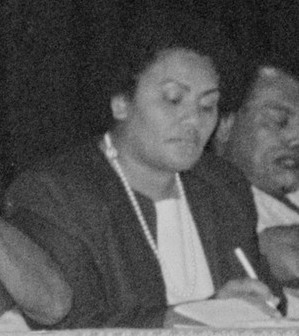
- Adi Kuini in 1988

2nd Leader of the Labour Party
- In office 1989–1991
- Preceded by: Timoci Bavadra
- Succeeded by: Mahendra Chaudhry

Deputy Prime Minister of Fiji
- In office May 1999 – May 2000 Serving with Tupeni Baba
- Prime Minister: Mahendra Chaudhry

Member for Serua Navosa
- In office 1999–2001
- Preceded by: Office established
- Succeeded by: Pio Wong

Personal details
- Born: 23 December 1949
- Died: 31 December 2004
- Party: Labour
- Spouse: Timoci Bavadra

Adi Kuini Teimumu Vuikaba Speed (23 December 1949 – 31 December 2004) was a Fijian chief and politician, who served as Deputy Prime Minister from May 1999 to May 2000.

She was the head girl at Adi Cakobau School in 1968, and went on to graduate from the University of the South Pacific and from the Australian National University in Canberra. She subsequently pursued a career in the Public Relations Office, which later became the Ministry of Information. On behalf of the Fiji Public Service Association, she led several delegations to the United Nations.

== Political career ==
The widow of Fiji Labour Party founder and former Prime Minister Timoci Bavadra, Adi Kuini became the leader of the Labour Party after her husband's death in 1989, but resigned in 1991 to take up residence for a few years in Canberra, Australia. She was succeeded by Mahendra Chaudhry as leader of the Fiji Labour Party. Adi Kuini returned to Fiji in 1994 and became leader of the Fijian Association Party (FAP) in 1998 succeeding the former Finance Minister Josefata Kamikamica. Under her leadership, the FAP won 11 seats in the 71-member House of Representatives in the election of 1999. Forming a coalition with her former party, the Fiji Labour Party Adi Kuini became one of two Deputy Prime Ministers in the coalition government led by Mahendra Chaudhry.

The Chaudhry government was deposed on 19 May 2000 in a coup organized by George Speight. After the coup had been put down, she refused to support the possible return of Chaudhry as Prime Minister, however, claiming that Fiji needed a less controversial leader to bring about reconciliation among Fiji's ethnic communities and repair fractured multiracial relations.

In poor health following repeated operations on a brain tumor, she contested the elections held to restore democracy in September 2001, but all of her party's candidates were defeated as the ethnic Fijian community rallied around the Soqosoqo Duavata ni Lewenivanua (SDL) of Laisenia Qarase. Adi Kuini herself lost her Serua-Navosa Open Constituency to the SDL's Pio Wong.

== Personal life ==
Adi Kuini was the daughter of Ratu Aseri Qoro Latianara (1924–1998), whom she succeeded as Tui Noikoro Paramount Chief of Navosa, and of Lanieta Vuni; she herself was duly succeeded in these roles by her brother, Ratu Tomasi Latianara.

Adi Kuini was married three times, first to Military officer Savenaca Draunidalo (a Minister from 2001 to 2006), subsequently to Bavadra and finally to Clive Speed, a former director of the Business Council of Australia. She had four children (including the well-known lawyer Tupou Draunidalo, who became President of the National Federation Party in 2014 and was subsequently elected to Parliament that year) and eleven stepchildren. By the end of 2004, when she lost a long battle with cancer, she was the grandmother of three. She is buried in Korolevu, a two-hour drive from Sigatoka.

Politicians remembered Adi Kuini as a committed Christian and champion of racial tolerance, and as one who fought for reform of the chiefly system by insisting on standards of accountability for all chiefs.

| Preceded by Ratu Aseri Qoro Latianara | Tui Noikoro; 1996–2004 | Succeeded by Ratu Tomasi Latianara |
