= West Central (General Electors Communal Constituency, Fiji) =

Former electoral constituency in Fiji

West Central General Communal is a former electoral division of Fiji, one of 3 communal constituencies reserved for General Electors, an omnibus category including Caucasians, Chinese, and all others whose ethnicity was neither indigenous Fijian nor Indo-Fijian. Established by the 1997 Constitution, it came into being in 1999 and was used for the parliamentary elections of 1999, 2001, and 2006. (Of the remaining 68 seats, 43 were reserved for other ethnic communities and 25, called Open Constituencies, were elected by universal suffrage).

The 2013 Constitution promulgated by the Military-backed interim government abolished all constituencies and established a form of proportional representation, with the entire country voting as a single electorate.

== Election results ==
In the following tables, the primary vote refers to first-preference votes cast. The final vote refers to the final tally after votes for low-polling candidates have been progressively redistributed to other candidates according to pre-arranged electoral agreements (see electoral fusion), which may be customized by the voters (see instant run-off voting).

=== 1999 ===
Candidate	Political party	Votes	%
David Pickering	United General Party (UGP)	2,392	54.07
Kenneth Low	Independent (General Voters Party)	1,123	25.38
Arthur Jennings	Coalition of Independent Nationals (COIN)	909	20.55
Total		4,424	100.00

=== 2001 ===
Candidate	Political party	Votes	%
Mick Beddoes	United General Party (UGP)	2,178	55.13
Kelepi Covimaidrano Abariga	Soqosoqo Duavata ni Lewenivanua (SDL)	909	23.01
Rollan Lilo	General Voters Party (GVP)	739	18.70
Andrew Blake	Soqosoqo ni Vakavulewa ni Taukei (SVT)	125	3.16
Total		3,951	100.00

=== 2006 ===
Candidate	Political party	Votes	%
Mick Beddoes	United Peoples Party (UGP)	2,234	50.47
Pateresio Nunu Polania	Soqosoqo Duavata ni Lewenivanua (SDL)	1,651	37.30
Noel Iupasi Tofinga	National Alliance Party (NAPF)	453	10.23
Vula Tawake Shaw	Soqosoqo Duavata ni Lewenivanua (SDL)	54	1.22
Anaseini Tuineau Henry	National Alliance Party (NAPF)	34	0.77
Total		4,426	100.00

== Sources ==
- Psephos - Adam Carr's electoral archive
- Fiji Facts
