= Bahu Jamalpur =

- Village
- Location in Haryana, India Bahu Jamalpur (India)
- Coordinates: 28°54′31″N 76°31′36″E
- Country: India
- State: Haryana
- District: Rohtak

Population (2011)
  - Total: 1,526
- Time zone: UTC+05:30 (IST)
- ISO 3166 code: IN-HR
- Vehicle registration: HR

Bahu Jamalpur, also known as Chhoti Bahu, is a village in Rohtak District, Haryana, India. Former Prime Minister of Fiji Mahendra Chaudhry's ancestral village is Bahu Jamalpur with his grandfather, Ram Nath Chaudhry, emigrating from here to Fiji in 1902.

== Demographics of 2011 ==
As of 2011 India census, Bahu Jamalpur had a population of 1526 in 288 households. Males (821) constitute 53.8% of the population and females (705) 46.19%. Bahu Jamalpur has an average literacy (1124) rate of 73.65%, lower than the national average of 74%: male literacy (651) is 57.91%, and female literacy (473) is 42.08% of total literates (1124). In Bahu Jamalpur, 11.14% of the population is under 6 years of age (170).

Demographics of Bahu Jamalpur as of 2011.
1. Male (53.8%)
2. Females (46.2%)
