= Jone Navakamocea =

Fijian chief and politician

Ratu Jone Navakamocea is a Fijian chief and politician. A member of the Soqosoqo Duavata ni Lewenivanua (SDL) Party, he won the Serua Navosa Open Constituency in the 2006 Parliamentary election and was subsequently appointed State Minister for National Planning in the government of Laisenia Qarase. Following a military coup on 5 December 2006, he was appointed Minister for Local Government, Urban Development and Public Utilities in the interim Cabinet formed by Commodore Frank Bainimarama, who had led the coup. Navakamocea was thus one of the few members of the Qarase government to be given a post in the interim government.

In August 2006, Navakamocea called for the term Indo-Fijian to be banned, saying it amounted to identity theft. The minister actually was against using India-Fijian term to describe the Indian ethnics in Fiji. "We should use the word Indian to describe an Indian of Indian origin or ethnicity and Fijian for an indigenous Fijian," was quoted in Fiji Newspaper report by Jone Navakamocea. His core idea was that it is legally and politically incorrect to accept Fijian-Indian term as an ethnicity. Refusing being a racist, he also stated that this term was created by Indian academics for the purpose of "Fijanising " the Indian ethnicity in Fiji.
