= Pio Wong =

Fijian politician

Pio Iowane Wong is a Fijian politician of Fijian and Chinese descent. He served in the Cabinet from 2004 to 2006 as Minister for Local Government, Housing, Squatter Settlement, and the Environment.

In the election held in September 2001, Wong, a former Army officer with the rank of colonel, won the Serua Navosa Open Constituency for the Soqosoqo Duavata ni Lewenivanua (SDL), defeating Adi Kuini Speed, who had held the seat for many years. (Wong had previously contested the seat, unsuccessfully, as an independent candidate in the parliamentary election of 1999). He was appointed Minister for Local Government, Housing, Squatter Settlement, and Environment in 2004.

The SDL did not nominate Wong for another Parliamentary term. He stood as independent candidate in the 2006 general election and was defeated.
