= Krishna Prasad (politician) =

Fijian politician

Krishna Prasad (died 2010), was a Fijian politician of Indian descent, who held the Nadi Open Constituency in the House of Representatives for the Fiji Labour Party in the parliamentary election of 2001.

Prasad retired from politics at the general election held on 6–13 May 2006. Prasad died from a heart attack on 27 April 2010.
