= Mick Beddoes =

Fijian politician and businessman

The Honourable Mick Beddoes

Leader of the Opposition
- In office 3 June 2006 – 5 December 2006
- Prime Minister: Laisenia Qarase
- Preceded by: Mahendra Chaudry
- Succeeded by: (Overthrown); 2006 Fijian coup d'état
- In office 3 July 2001 – 17 April 2002
- Prime Minister: Laisenia Qarase
- Preceded by: Prem Singh
- Succeeded by: Mahendra Chaudry

Member of the House of Representatives of Fiji for West Central
- In office August 2001 – December 5, 2006
- Prime Minister: Laisenia Qarase
- Preceded by: David Pickering
- Succeeded by: (Overthrown); 2006 Fijian coup d'état

Personal details
- Born: 3 July 1951 (age 75) Lautoka, Colony of Fiji
- Party: Unity Fiji
- Other political affiliations: United Peoples Party (Fiji); Sodelpa
- Children: 3
- Education: Suva Grammar School

Mick Malcolm Millis Beddoes, widely known as Mick Beddoes, is a Fijian politician and businessman from Nadi. He was born on 3 July 1951 in Lautoka. Heled the United Peoples Party (formerly the United General Party) from 2000 to 2013, and was the Leader of the Opposition at the time of the military coup of 5 December 2006. He was also the Chief Executive of the World Netball Company, and was Chairman of the organising committee for the 2007 World Netball Championships, but announced his resignation on 24 January 2006, citing a possible conflict of interest, as his company would be working as a ground operator during the championships.

== First term as Leader of the Opposition ==
Beddoes won the West Central General Electors Communal constituency, one of three reserved for ethnic minorities, for the United General Party in the 2001 parliamentary election. Despite being the sole parliamentary representative of his party, he served as Leader of the Opposition from 2002 to 2004, because Mahendra Chaudhry, leader of the Fiji Labour Party (the main opposition party) refused the position, demanding inclusion in the Cabinet instead. Beddoes relinquished the role of Opposition Leader late in 2004, when Chaudhry finally gave up his quest for a Cabinet role and agreed to assume the leadership of the Opposition.

Beddoes's first stint as Opposition Leader gave him and his tiny party a national platform. In mid-2003, Beddoes responded to rising interest among indigenous and Indo- Fijians by announcing that membership of his party, which had been confined to minority groups like Europeans, Chinese, and Banaban Islanders, would now be open to all races, and that the party would contest all 71 seats in the House of Representatives in the next parliamentary election, scheduled for 2006.

Beddoes criticised the ethnic faultlines that characterise Fijian politics; communal voting was a factor in this, he said on 28 August 2005, but could be mitigated if only voters would judge a candidate according to his or her personal merits, rather than on the basis of whether the candidate's political party was indigenous-led or Indo-Fijian-led. He also called for changes to the electoral system, under which almost two-thirds of the House of Representatives are elected from communal constituencies, whose electors are registered members of a particular ethnic group.

== Second term as Leader of the Opposition ==
Beddoes retained his constituency, with a slightly reduced majority, in the parliamentary election held on 6–13 May 2006, and was appointed Leader of the Opposition for the second time on 3 June (source). His second appointment came after weeks of disputes with his erstwhile ally, Mahendra Chaudhry, who had insisted that the position should be his, despite the decision of the Labour Party to enter a grand coalition with the Soqosoqo Duavata ni Lewenivanua Party (SDL). After obtaining legal advice, President Ratu Josefa Iloilo appointed Beddoes.

As of 19 September, Beddoes was still performing his duties only on a part-time basis, Fiji Television reported. To assume the position full-time, he would be constitutionally required to divest himself of his private business interests.

== Campaign against controversial bill ==
Throughout much of 2005, Beddoes was at the forefront of a public campaign against the government's controversial Reconciliation, Tolerance, and Unity Bill, which provided for the establishment of a Commission empowered to compensate victims and pardon perpetrators of the coup d'état which deposed the People's Coalition government in May 2000. Beddoes travelled throughout Fiji, speaking against the bill, which was, he claimed, nothing other than a legal mechanism for releasing from prison persons convicted of involvement in the coup, who were supporters of or in some way linked to the present government. The bill was temporarily shelved during the election and its aftermath. An amended version was pending, but the military coup of 5 December 2006 put an end to it.

== 2006 coup d'état ==
Long considered an ally of the Republic of Fiji Military Forces in their long-running dispute with the Qarase government, Beddoes began criticising the Military towards the end of 2006, as tensions escalated to unprecedented levels. On 20 October, Fiji Television quoted him as calling for an end to the Military's attempts to intimidate the government. On the other hand, he called on the government on 28 November to placate the Military by dropping investigations into insubordination on the part of the Commander, Commodore Frank Bainimarama. "All it is doing is putting a red rag in front of a bull and the bull has 4,000 guns," he told Australia's ABC Radio. On 1 December, as it became apparent that a coup was imminent, he branded the Military a bunch of bullies, and issued a strong warning to persons who might be considering accepting office in an interim government, saying that they would be taken to task when the storm had passed. On 4 December, Beddoes called on Fijians to rally in support of the rule of law.

Beddoes condemned the coup of 5 December, and spoke out strongly against what he saw as violations of constitutional and human rights.

Beddoes welcomed the decision of the Military to restore Ratu Josefa Iloilo to the Presidency on 4 January 2007, but condemned the appointment of Bainimarama as interim Prime Minister on 5 January and criticised the President's endorsement of the coup, the Fiji Times reported. He expressed disappointment when his deputy, Bernadette Rounds-Ganilau, accepted office in Bainimarama's interim government, and asked her to resign from the UPP. He was particularly disappointed, he said, that Ganilau's decision came less than twenty-four hours after he had been visited by soldiers conveying a message from Land Force Commander Pita Driti threatening him to stop speaking against the Military. On 10 January, he accused the Fiji Labour Party, some of whose leading figures, were included in the interim government, of having been privy to the coup plot.

== Political views ==
=== LGBTQ rights ===
Beddoes is a supporter of LGBTQ rights.

On 27 August 2005, Beddoes spoke out against calls by some for the closure of loopholes in the Penal Code which had allowed the release of two men, one a Fijian citizen and the other a foreigner, who had been sentenced to a prison term on 5 April for homosexual acts. This sentence was overturned on 26 August by Justice Gerald Winter, who said that the Penal Code was not applicable to what adults did in private.

The same day, Beddoes condemned Senator Mitieli Bulanauca for speaking against homosexuality and attacking Justice Winter in the Senate. "Senator Bulanauca is among a very small percentage of misfits and clowns who live off the lies they try to spin to try and intimidate others, while sheltering behind parliamentary privilege," Beddoes said. "These expressions of hate come from a man who claims he is a Christian and quotes endlessly from the Bible."

== Retirement ==
On 20 January 2007, Beddoes announced that he would retire from the presidency of the UPP at the Annual General Meeting of his party, on 31 March.

After the winding up of the UPP in January 2013, Beddoes announced that he would join the new Social Democratic Liberal Party.

In 2021 He announce he would Join Unity Fiji for the 2022 Fijian General Election.

Preceded by Prem Singh	Leader of the Opposition; 2002-2004	Succeeded by Mahendra Chaudhry
Preceded by Mahendra Chaudhry	Leader of the Opposition; 2006	Succeeded by vacant
