= Kenneth Zinck =

Fijian trade unionist and politician

Minister for Labour, Industrial Relations, and Productivity
- In office 2001–2006
- Prime Minister: Laisenia Qarase

Member of the Fijian Parliament for Suva City General
- In office 1 September 2001 – 13 May 2006
- Preceded by: Bill Aull
- Succeeded by: Bernadette Ganilau

Personal details
- Born: 16 June 1959 (age 67) Suva, Fiji
- Party: Fiji Labour Party; New Labour Unity Party

Kenneth Vincent Zinck (born 16 June 1959) is a former Fijian trade unionist, politician and Cabinet Minister, who served as Minister of Labour in the government of Laisenia Qarase from 2001 to 2006. In the aftermath of the 2006 Fijian coup d'état he sought political asylum in Australia.

== Early life ==
Zinck is of Samoan, German, and Fijian descent. He was educated at Marist Brothers High School in Suva. In 1987 he was arrested along with future Attorney-General Aiyaz Sayed Khaiyum for protesting against the 1987 Fijian coups d'état.

He worked as president of the Fiji Bank and Finance Sector Employees Union.

== Political career ==
He unsuccessfully contested the Suva City Open constituency as a candidate of the Fiji Labour Party in the 1999 Fijian general election, losing to United General Party candidate Ofa Duncan.

Following the split in the Labour Party in the wake of the 2000 Fijian coup d'état Zinck joined the New Labour Unity Party (NLUP). He was elected to the House of Representatives of Fiji as an NLUP candidate in the Suva City General Electors Communal constituency at the 2001 election. He was one of only two NLUP candidates to be elected, the other being Duncan, who had defected from the UGP.

The election produced an inconclusive result; Laisenia Qarase's SDL emerged as the largest single party, with 32 of the 71 seats, short of an overall majority in the House of Representatives. Qarase cobbled together a coalition with a number of smaller parties and independents. Zinck defied the NLUP leadership by accepting a Cabinet post as Minister for Labour, Industrial Relations, and Productivity. As a result, he was expelled from the party on 4 December 2003. He successfully challenged the expulision with the Speaker of Parliament, who ruled it invalid on procedural grounds. He therefore officially remained a NLUP parliamentarian, even though the party was deregistered in 2005.

As Labour Minister Zinck threatened to discipline doctors undertaking Work-to-rule action, and accused Asian immigrants of taking jobs from locals in Fiji's garment industry. He repeatedly threatened to jail union leaders and deregister unions engaging in illegal strikes, causing tension with the Fiji Trades Union Congress. In February 2004, faced with a widespread public sector strike over a cost-of-living adjustment, Zinck referred the issue to compulsory arbitration. In November 2004 the High Court of Fiji ruled that this was unlawful and motivated by bias and ill-will.

In December 2005, Zinck called for Pacific nations to form a trade bloc to present a united front to represent common interests before international organizations, such as the World Trade Organization. He also called for greater labour mobility between Australia and New Zealand and the rest of the Pacific.

In the leadup to the 2006 election, the NLUP formed a coalition with the FLP. Zinck subsequently ran as an independent, but failed to win re-election.

== 2006 coup and aftermath ==
Following his electoral defeat, Fiji Trades Union Congress president Daniel Urai said that Zinck would never work in the union movement again, but in October 2006 he was elected secretary of the Fiji Islands Revenue and Customs Authority staff association.

The day after the 2006 Fijian coup d'état he was arrested and later released, by the Republic of Fiji Military Forces, after a relative of Military Commander Commodore Frank Bainimarama allegedly heard him making derogatory comments about the Commander at Suva's United Club. Zinck claimed to have been subjected to degrading treatment, including being forced to run around a sports field with the guns of four soldiers trained upon him. He was then allegedly forced to stand under a spotlight at Queen Elizabeth Barracks with soldiers standing behind him, warning him against making further statements against the Commander, before being ordered to leave the barracks. Fiji Human Rights Commission Director Shaista Shameem said on 9 December that the incident was being investigated.

On 14 December 2006, the Military authorities terminated Zinck's membership of the board of the Civil Aviation Authority of Fiji.

In March 2007, following his successfully representing workers of the Fiji Islands Revenue and Customs Authority in a pay dispute, Zinck was detained by the military for a third time. He continued to speak out against the military regime, questioning its legitimacy and its right to use public money, and criticising its plans to overturn the 1997 Constitution of Fiji. In the leadup to the 2009 Fijian constitutional crisis, Zinck was targeted in a wave of attacks against critics of the regime, and his home and car were stoned by unidentified men.

In September 2011 he sought political asylum in Australia, alleging repeated physical abuse by the military.
