= National Democratic Party (Fiji, 2006) =

- Founded: 2006

The National Democratic Party (NDP) was a Fijian political party formed to contest the general election of 2006. It contested only the Serua Navosa Open Constituency, and received only 123 votes out of almost 18,000.

This was the second party of this name to be formed in Fiji. A previous National Democratic Party had been formed in the 1960s, when Fiji was still a British colony.
