= Cream Holdings Ltd v Banerjee =

2004 British House of Lords decision

- Court: House of Lords
- Full case name: Cream Holdings Limited & Others v Chumki Banerjee & The Liverpool Daily Post & Echo Limited
- Decided: 14 October 2004
- Citation: [2004] UKHL 44
- Transcript: transcript at BAILII

Case history
- Prior actions: High Court of Justice Chancery Division; Court of Appeal of England and Wales ([2003] EWCA Civ 103)

Court membership
- Judges sitting: Lord Nicholls; Lord Woolf; Lord Hoffmann; Lord Scott; Lady Hale

Case opinions
- Nicholls

Keywords
- confidentiality, human rights

Cream Holdings Ltd v Banerjee [2004] UKHL 44 was a 2004 decision by the House of Lords on the impact of the Human Rights Act 1998 on freedom of expression. The Act, particularly Section 12, cautioned the courts to only grant remedies that would restrict publication before trial where it is "likely" that the trial will establish that the publication would not be allowed. Banerjee, an accountant with Cream Holdings, obtained documents which she claimed contained evidence of illegal and unsound practices on Cream's part and gave them to the Liverpool Daily Post & Echo, who ran a series of articles on 13 and 14 June 2002 asserting that a director of Cream had been bribing a local council official in Liverpool. Cream applied for an emergency injunction on 18 June in the High Court of Justice, where Lloyd J decided on 5 July that Cream had shown "a real prospect of success" at trial, granting the injunction. This judgment was confirmed by the Court of Appeal on 13 February 2003.

Leave was given to appeal to the House of Lords, where a judgment was given on 14 October 2004 by Lord Nicholls, with the other judges assenting. In it, Nicholls said that the test required by the Human Rights Act, "more likely than not", was a higher standard than "a real prospect of success", and that the Act "makes the likelihood of success at the trial an essential element in the court's consideration of whether to make an interim order", asserting that in similar cases courts should be reluctant to grant interim injunctions unless it can be shown that the claimant is "more likely than not" to succeed. At the same time, he admitted that the "real prospect of success" test was not necessarily insufficient, granting the appeal nonetheless because Lloyd J had ignored the public interest element of the disclosure. As the first confidentiality case brought after the Human Rights Act, Cream is the leading case used in British "breach of confidentiality" cases.

== Facts ==
The Human Rights Act 1998, which came into force in 2000, brought the European Convention on Human Rights into British domestic law. Article 8 of the convention covers "the right to respect for private and family life", and during the passage of the Act through Parliament, elements of the press were concerned that this could affect their freedom of expression. As such, Section 12 of the Act provides that, if a court is considering whether to grant relief which infringes on the right to freedom of expression (such as an injunction), it must "have particular regard to the importance of the Convention right to freedom of expression", although recognising the other limits put on this right. Where a relief (such as an injunction) is granted in the absence of the respondent, the court must be satisfied that the claimant has taken all reasonable steps to ensure that the defendant was notified, unless there are compelling reasons why they should not be. The court must also not grant relief that would restrict publication before trial, unless satisfied that it is "likely" the trial will establish that publication should not be allowed.

Cream Holdings (the claimant) started as a group of nightclubs in Liverpool, later franchising their name, logo and brand. Chumki Banerjee (the first defendant) was an accountant advising the Cream group from 1996 to 1998, officially joining Cream as the financial controller for one of their groups in February 1998. In January 2001 she was dismissed, taking documents with her which she claimed showed illegal and improper actions by Cream. These were given to the group controlling the Liverpool Daily Post & Echo (the second defendant), with Banerjee receiving no payment. On 13 and 14 June 2002, the Post & Echo published articles asserting that one of the Cream directors was bribing a local council official. On 18 June, Cream applied for an interim injunction preventing the Post & Echo from publishing any further material received from Banerjee. The second defendant admitted that the information was confidential, but argued that it was in the public interest to disclose it. Historically, courts had been willing to grant interim injunctions where confidentiality had been breached, but Cream was the first case to test the extent of the Human Rights Act, and the standard set is the standard one applied in breach of confidentiality cases.

== Judgment ==
On 5 July 2002, Lloyd J in the High Court of Justice (Chancery Division) granted an interim injunction, saying that Cream had shown "a real prospect of success" at trial. The defendants appealed to the Court of Appeal of England and Wales, arguing that Lloyd J had applied the "a real prospect of success" test, rather than the requirement under the Human Rights Act that the claimant demonstrate a "likely" chance of success. On 13 February 2003, Simon Brown and Arden LJJ in the Court of Appeal of England and Wales held that Lloyd J had used the appropriate test, although Sedley LJ dissented. The defendants were allowed appeal to the House of Lords.

In the House of Lords, the case was considered by Lord Nicholls, Lord Woolf, Lord Hoffmann, Lord Scott and Lady Hale, who made their judgment on 14 October 2004, provided by Lord Nicholls. Nicholls made it clear that Section 12 of the Human Rights Act "makes the likelihood of success at the trial an essential element in the court's consideration of whether to make an interim order", cautioning that courts should be very reluctant to grant relief in favour of a party who is unable to establish that it is more likely than not that he will succeed at trial. He said that "more likely than not", the phrase used in the Act, was a higher threshold to meet than "a real prospect of success", the previous test, which was not intended to apply to the media. While saying this, Nicholls also suggested that the initial test was not necessarily an improper one, but that Lloyd J had overlooked the element of public interest in the disclosure. As such, the House of Lords allowed the Post & Echo and Banerjee's appeal.

== Bibliography ==
- Cheney, Deborah (1999). Criminal Justice and the Human Rights Act 1998. Jordans. ISBN 0-85308-504-8.
- Devonshire, Peter (2005). "Restraint on freedom of expression under the Human Rights Act: Cream Holdings Ltd v Banerjee in the House of Lords". Civil Justice Quarterly. 24 (2). Sweet & Maxwell. ISSN 0261-9261.
- Foster, Steve (2004). "Freedom of expression, prior restraint and section 12 of the Human Rights Act 1998". Coventry Law Journal. 9 (2). Coventry University. ISSN 0965-0660.
- Lewis, Mark; Charlotte Hinton (2005). "Interim restraint orders: clarification of Section 12(3) of the Human Rights Act 1998". Entertainment Law Review. 16 (2). Sweet & Maxwell. ISSN 0959-3799.
- Wadham, John (2007). Blackstone's Guide to the Human Rights Act 1998 (4th ed.). Oxford University Press. ISBN 978-0-19-929957-7.
