= Bernadette Ganilau =

Fijian writer and politician

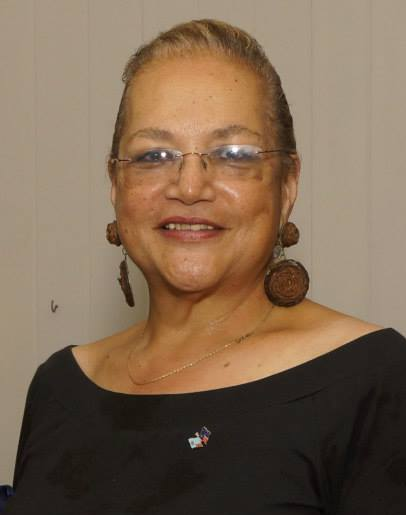
Ganilau in 2014

Rose Lavenia Bernadette Rounds Ganilau (born July 5, 1951, as Lavenia Bernadette Rounds) is a Fijian writer, broadcaster, and politician, who served as Minister for Labour, Minister for Tourism, Industrial Relations, Productivity and Environment in the interim Cabinet of Commodore Frank Bainimarama, having been appointed on 9 January 2007. In previous political roles, she served in 2000 and 2001 in the Interim Government of Prime Minister Laisenia Qarase as Assistant Minister for Social Welfare, and from June to December 2006, she was Deputy Leader of the Opposition and Chairperson of the Public Accounts Committee of the House of Representatives, until the military coup of 5 December.

Long a political activist, Ganilau's causes included women's rights and human rights in general, and has served as President of Women Entrepreneurs Fiji. She spent much of mid-to-late 2005 campaigning against the government's controversial Reconciliation, Tolerance, and Unity Bill, which proposes to establish a Commission with the power to compensate victims and pardon perpetrators of the Fiji coup of 2000. On 13 July 2005, she described the bill as one that would encourage hatred and violence rather than tolerance and accommodation.

== Personal life ==
Ganilau is married to Ratu Jone Antonio Rabici Rabaraba Ganilau, the youngest son of Ratu Sir Penaia Ganilau, Fiji's first President (1987-1993). They have adopted his grand-niece Jordana Nicolai Adi Mei Vikatoria Kainona Ganilau, daughter of Adi Laisa Ganilau. Her brother-in-law, Ratu Epeli Ganilau, was a well-known contemporary politician.

Ganilau grew up in a home surrounded by music. Her mother was musician Bonita Rounds who played piano in a group called the Snappy Six.

== Career ==
In 2000, Ganilau was appointed an interim Minister after the 2000 Fijian coup d'état.

Ganilau contested and won the Suva City General Communal Constituency for the United Peoples Party (UPP) in the general election scheduled for 6–13 May, defeating Cabinet Minister Kenneth Zinck. She was one of two UPP candidates returned in the election.

She resigned from the United People's Party in 2007 after being ousted as Deputy Opposition leader and accepting an office in the interim government. She was appointed to oversee Labour and Tourism. UPP leader Mick Beddoes, an opponent of the military coup and of the government formed by its leader, asked her to resign from the party.

In January 2008, Ganilau was "dropped" from the government position of Tourism Minister during a Cabinet reshuffle. In November 2008 she established the Green Party of Fiji. Due to a court order, the party was dissolved with its assets forfeited to the State. Ganilau choose not to run in the 2018 General Election citing her familie's wishes.

She, along with six other women, took the Government to court over the 'Electoral (Registration of Voters) Act' and the 'Interpretation Act' of 2021. The law required voters to change their birth certificate to match the name they registered to vote with, which means married women who adopted their husbands last name were required to change their name on their birth certificate as well. The act went into effect on October 31, 2022; while the case was still pending. The law was still in place in May 2023.
