= Tupeni Baba =

Fijian academic and politician (1942–2024)

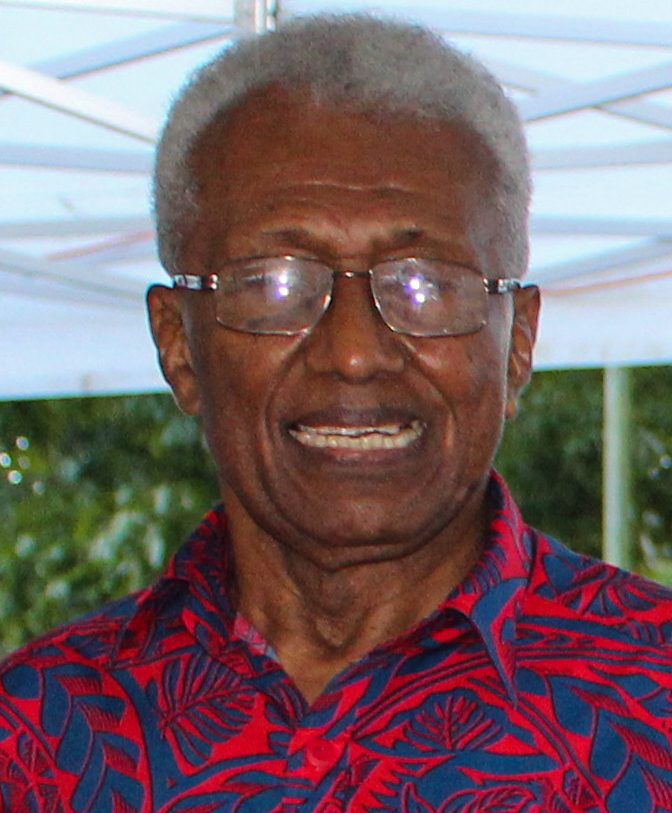
- Baba in 2022

Deputy Prime Minister of Fiji
- In office May 1999 – 19 May 2000 Serving with Kuini Speed
- Prime Minister: Mahendra Chaudhry
- Prime Minister: Laisenia Qarase

Minister for Foreign Affairs
- In office 1999 – 19 May 2000
- Preceded by: Berenado Vunibobo
- Succeeded by: Kaliopate Tavola

Minister for Education, Youth, and Sport
- In office April 1987 – 14 May 1987
- Prime Minister: Timoci Bavadra

Member of the Fijian Parliament for Samabula Tamavua Open
- In office 15 May 1999 – 1 September 2001
- Preceded by: None (constituency established)
- Succeeded by: Manoa Dobui

Member of the Fijian Parliament for Suva Fijian
- In office 11 April 1987 – 14 May 1987
- Preceded by: David Toganivalu
- Succeeded by: None (Constitution abrogated)

Personal details
- Born: 14 June 1942 Colony of Fiji
- Died: 14 July 2024 (aged 82)
- Party: Fiji Labour Party; New Labour Unity Party; Soqosoqo Duavata ni Lewenivanua; Social Democratic Liberal Party

Tupeni Lebaivalu Baba (14 June 1942 – 14 July 2024) was a Fijian academic, politician, and Cabinet Minister. A founding member of the Fiji Labour Party, he served as a Cabinet Minister in the government of Timoci Bavadra until removed from office by the 1987 Fijian coups d'état, and then one of the two Deputy Prime Ministers in the government of Mahendra Chaudhry until removed from office by the 2000 Fijian coup d'état. After splitting with Choudhry in the wake of the coup, he founded the New Labour Unity Party to contest the 2001 election, but failed to win a seat in Parliament. He unsuccessfully attempting to re-enter politics at the 2006 election under the banner of the Soqosoqo Duavata ni Lewenivanua, and again at the 2014 election as part of the Social Democratic Liberal Party.

When not in politics, Baba pursued an academic career, first at the University of the South Pacific, then at the University of Auckland's Centre for Pacific Studies, and later at the University of Fiji.

== Early life ==
Baba was born on 14 June 1942. He held a master's degree in education from the University of Sydney and a doctorate from Macquarie University in Australia, and while there, was critical of South Pacific Commission, attacking it as a colonial organisation. He was later appointed registrar at the University of the South Pacific, but resigned from the position in December 1984 to return to a teaching role.

== Political career ==
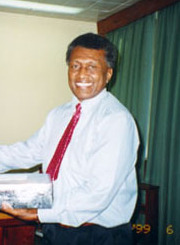
Baba in 1999

Baba was a founding member of the Fiji Labour Party and in 1986 was its vice-president. He ran as a candidate for the Labour-National Federation Party Coalition at the 1987 Fijian general election and was elected to the House of Representatives of Fiji in the Suva Fijian constituency, defeating Deputy Prime Minister David Toganivalu. Timoci Bavadra was appointed prime minister, and Baba was appointed Minister of Education, Youth, and Sports in his Cabinet. A month later, the new government was deposed in the first of the 1987 Fijian coups d'état led by Lieutenant Colonel Sitiveni Rabuka. In the aftermath of the coup, he campaigned in Australia and flew to London in an effort to gain support for the ousted government. He was later part of the ousted government's efforts to negotiate a peaceful return to democracy through the Rabuka regime's constitutional review committee.

Baba returned to his academic career at the University of the South Pacific, where he remained until 1999, when he was again elected to Parliament and became Foreign Minister and one of two Deputy Prime Ministers in the government of Mahendra Chaudhry. During the 2000 Fijian coup d'état in which most members of the government were kidnapped by George Speight, Baba's courage as one of the hostages earned him considerable public respect.

Following the coup tensions within the Labour Party caused a split. When the Court of Appeal of Fiji legally overturned the coup in its decision on Republic of Fiji Islands v Prasad, Baba was promoted as the potential leader of a government of national unity from the reconvened parliament. Choudhry instead advised President Josefa Iloilo to dissolve parliament and call an election to re-establish constitutional rule. Baba then announced he was forming a new political party to contest the 2001 election. He subsequently launched the New Labour Unity Party in June 2001. Large numbers of anti-Chaudhry dissidents followed him out of the party into the New Labour Unity Party. The party won only 4.5% of the vote and two seats. Baba stood in Samabula Tamavua Open, but failed to secure election.

== Life outside politics ==
Baba waited until 2005 to reiterate and clarify his reasons for leaving the Labour Party. It was no longer the party he had joined under the leadership of Timoci Bavadra in the 1980s, he said on 18 September 2005. Bavadra's vision had been of a multiracial Fiji, but the present leadership of the party could not see past ethnic boundaries. All that was left of Bavadra's party was the name, he said. He expressed disappointment at Chaudhry's failure as Leader of the Opposition to work with Prime Minister Laisenia Qarase on matters of national importance, saying that when the party negotiated with the government at all, it appeared more like a trade union than a political party. In a multiethnic country like Fiji, Baba said, it was imperative that leaders look beyond ethnic boundaries.

On 22 December 2005, Baba said that he would pursue academic and consultancy work after completing his four-year contract at the University of Auckland, which expired at the end of 2005. He was happy to be away from politics, he said, and was not inclined to return to it. He found recent political trends in Fiji depressing, especially the polarization of political parties on ethnic lines. Questioned again by the Fiji Village news service on 16 February, after his return to Fiji, he refused to be drawn on whether he would contest the 2006 election or not, but made it clear that he was no longer affiliated with the FLP.

In May 2005 he published the book Speight of Violence, coauthored by Baba, his partner Unaisi Nabobo-Baba, and New Zealand journalist Michael Field. The book gave a history of the 2000 coup, informed by excerpts from Baba’s secret diary kept while he was a hostage, and generated controversy with its claims that the Labour coalition had been planning to oust Chaudhry before the coup.

== 2006 return to politics ==
In March 2006 the SDL party approached Baba and asked him to be a candidate. He was subsequently approved as the party's candidate for the Tamavua Samabula Open Constituency. His appointment was controversial as it bypassed the SDL's normal selection procedures. Following his selection baba denounced the Fiji Labour party and the leadership of Mahendra Chaudhry, saying that the party was negative and had no future and that Fiji needed to end racial politics. However, he failed to secure a seat in Parliament.

Following the election, Baba was he was appointed to the Senate of Fiji as one of nine nominees of the Fijian government. In October 2006 he was nominated as Fiji's Ambassador to the United Nations. This plan was aborted, however, by the 2006 Fijian coup d'état on 5 December. The Military later announced that Baba might face investigation for his alleged links to international fraudster Peter Foster.

== 2014 return to politics ==
Following the imprisonment of former prime minister and SDL leader Laisenia Qarase in 2012, Baba emerged as a de facto spokesperson for the party. When the SDL was dissolved by the military regime, he helped to found the Social Democratic Liberal Party (SDLP) as its successor. He briefly led the party in 2014, but made way for Ro Teimumu Kepa, a high chief and former Cabinet Minister. He was a candidate in the 2014 Fijian general election, but was not elected.

In September 2013 he was one of a number of prominent politicians arrested for protesting against the new constitution imposed by the military regime. He was arrested again and detained for a weekend in September 2016 after participating in a meeting to discuss the country's constitution. No charges were laid.

In February 2017 following Sitiveni Rabuka becoming SODELPA leader he resigned from the party and joined the HOPE Party as an advisor.

== Death ==
Baba died on 14 July 2024, at the age of 82.
