= Kenneth Low =

Chinese-Fijian businessman and political leader

Kenneth Mang-Kwong Low (Chinese: 刘孟光) is a Chinese-Fijian businessman and political leader. He unsuccessfully contested the parliamentary election of 1999 as a candidate for the General Voters Party (GVP) for the Western Central (General Electors) Communal Constituency. He also lost the Fiji national elections in 2001 for the Suva City (General Electors) Communal Constituency, where he was the candidate of the Soqosoqo Duavata ni Lewenivanua (SDL), but was appointed to the Senate as one of nine nominees of the Fijian Prime Minister, and became Vice-President of the Senate on 28 February 2005, the first Chinese-Fijian to do so, following the appointment of the previous Vice-President, Dr Ahmed Ali to a Government Cabinet position.

== Family background ==
According to Low, he was born in Chongqing, China at the end of World War II and came to Fiji at the age of 10. He is a third generation Sino-Fijian with his grandfather Low Fong arriving in Fiji in 1908. Low's father Low Kum-Tim, came with his family to Fiji from Hong Kong in 1955 as a school teacher in the Lautoka Chinese School. In Hong Kong, Low Kum-Tim and his two partners, Chiang Yu-Loong and Ma Kok-Yu operated the "Green Sea Farm" for 5 years after leaving mainland China. The farm had received government awards for being the best and most progressive chicken farm, and Low Kum-Tim had published 3 books on "Diseases of Chicken and the cure" during this time from experience in raising chicken commercially.

Low Kum-Tim was an artist in traditional chinese painting of the Chinese grand master Qi BaiShi school, and had held many exhibitions in the Fiji Arts Club in the 1960s together with Sec-Poy Fong, managing director of On Wah Chang, Suva. In June 1966, Low's parents and brothers migrated to the United States and lived in New York City. Low Kum-Tim continued his passion for painting in NYC and had held several exhibitions in New York and Philadelphia. He died in 1993 after battling Parkinson's disease for almost 20 years.

== Education ==
In 1966, Low left Fiji to study architecture at the University of New South Wales. After graduating in 1970, he remained in Sydney and commenced private practice in architecture from 1974. He was also a registered Gold Licensed Builder in N.S.W. from 1978. Low taught Architecture and Construction at the Sydney College of Technical and Further Education from 1976–1978. Whilst teaching, he also completed his Diploma in Education in 1978.

Low returned to Fiji in 1983 and set up his private practice in architecture and construction until the 1987 coup. He then returned to Sydney and undertook construction contracts. But in 1991, Low again returned to Fiji, to practise architecture and also as a property developer and investor.

Low, who is the founder (1994) and President of the All Chinese Business Association of Fiji, worked to promote trade directly between Fiji and China.

== Senatorial service ==
During his time as Senator, Low supported indigenous Fijian dominance. He also joined much of the Fiji-born Chinese community in calling for a crackdown on illegal immigration (mainly from mainland China) which he said was detrimental to the local-born Chinese and the Chinese reputation as a whole. He alleged in the Senate on 8 November 2005 that corrupt immigration officials in Fiji were granting Fijian citizenship and visas to illegal Chinese immigrants, for financial and sexual favours, and called for a full inquiry into what was going on.

== Career after politics ==
Low retired from the Senate in June 2006 and did not participate in the 2006 national elections.

Low is now actively promoting and fostering better relationships between Fiji and China. Today, Low remains the Chairman of Board of Directors, and is the current Manager of the Lautoka Chinese School. In 2003–2004, Low increased the number of classrooms and upgraded the school hall.
