= Mahendra Chaudhry =

Fijian politician (born 1942)

The Honourable Mahendra Chaudhry
- महेन्द्र चौधरी (Fiji Hindi)
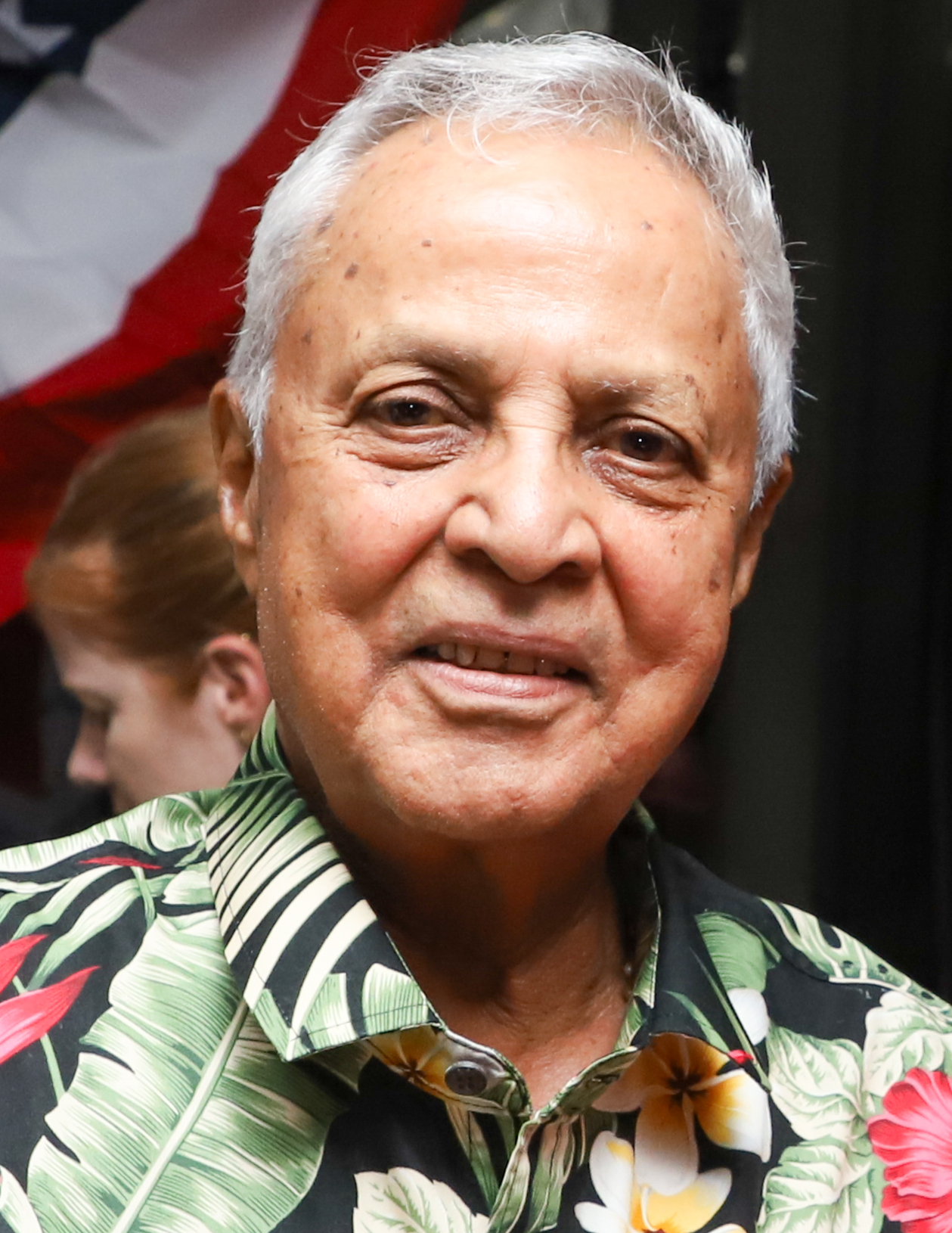
- Chaudhry in 2023

4th Prime Minister of Fiji
- In office 19 May 1999 – 27 May 2000
- President: Kamisese Mara
- Deputy: Kuini Speed; Tupeni Baba
- Preceded by: Sitiveni Rabuka
- Succeeded by: Tevita Momoedonu

3rd Leader of the Labour Party
- Incumbent
- Assumed office 1991
- Preceded by: Kuini Speed

Member for Ba
- In office 1999–2006
- Preceded by: Office established
- Succeeded by: Office abolished

Personal details
- Born: 9 February 1942 (age 84) Ba, Colony of Fiji (present-day Fiji)
- Party: Labour
- Spouse: Virmatee Chaudhry (m. 1965)
- Children: 3

Mahendra Pal Chaudhry (Note: Fiji Hindi: महेन्द्र पाल चौधरी) (born 9 February 1942) is a Fijian politician and the leader of the Fiji Labour Party. Following a historic election in which he defeated the long-time former leader, Sitiveni Rabuka in a landslide, the former trade union leader became Fiji's first Indo-Fijian Prime Minister on 19 May 1999, but exactly one year later, on 19 May 2000 he and most of his Cabinet were taken hostage in the Fiji coup of 2000 by coup leader George Speight. Unable to exercise his duties, he and his ministers were sacked by President Ratu Sir Kamisese Mara on 27 May; Mara intended to assume emergency powers himself but was himself deposed by the military leader, Commodore Frank Bainimarama.

After 56 days in captivity, Chaudhry was released on 13 July and subsequently embarked on a tour of the world to rally support. He was one of the leading voices raised in opposition to the Qarase government's proposed Reconciliation and Unity Commission, which he said was just a mechanism to grant amnesty to persons guilty of coup-related offences. In January 2007, he was appointed as Minister of Finance, Sugar Reform Public Enterprise and National Planning in the interim Cabinet of Commodore Frank Bainimarama, following another coup. Chaudhry was also co-chair of the task force focusing on economic growth within the National Council for Building a Better Fiji. In August 2008, he left the government and became an outspoken critic of it.

== Family background ==
Mahendra Chaudhry was born in an Indo-Fijian family in the town of Ba in Fiji. His paternal grandfather Ram Nath Chaudhry was from a Hindu family of the village of Bahu Jamalpur in Haryana, India (then the British Raj) and arrived in the British Colony of Fiji in 1902, as an indentured labourer, to work on Fiji's sugarcane plantations. On his arrival in Fiji he disputed the agreement to work in the plantations and was employed as a store manager until he started his own business. He later returned to India with his wife, Ram Kalia, who died 22 September 1930 at the age of 45, and whom he had met and married in Fiji. His daughter, Raj Kumari also went to India with them. His sons Ram Gopal and Krishan Gopal Chaudhry remained in Fiji. Mahendra was Ram Gopal's eldest son and one of his 15 children. Mahendra's maternal grandfather was from the Indian state of Kerala, and had settled in Fiji in the early 1900s.

He worked as a government auditor, then as secretary of the Fiji Public Service Association during its 1973 strike, and later as vice-president of the Fiji Trades Union Congress. He also served on the board of the Fiji National Provident Fund until 1986.

In 2004, Chaudhry received the Pravasi Bharatiya Samman, which is granted to members of the Indian diaspora to honor their contributions to the countries of which they are members. Chaudhry was the first Fijian citizen to receive this award.

== Political career ==
=== Cabinet member after 1987 election win ===
Chaudhry helped to launch the Fiji Labour Party in 1985, and served as its assistant secretary. The Labour got its first chance to test its popularity in the by-election for the North Central Indian National Seat in December 1985, following the resignation of Vijay R. Singh. FLP decided to field Mahendra Chaudhry, who was also the general secretary of the National Farmers Union, as its candidate. Chaudhry lost the election by only 204 votes.

He was elected to Parliament for the first time in the 1987 general election and appointed Minister of Finance and Economic Planning in the coalition government of Timoci Bavadra. This government held office for barely a month; on 14 May, Lieutenant Colonel Sitiveni Rabuka deposed the government in the first of two military coups. In the aftermath of the coup he was repeatedly detained by the military. In January 1988 in his role as PSA secretary he led a strike by Suva firefights, which the military regime declared illegal. He was subsequently elected general secretary of the FTUC, and in this role led union resistance to the military regime. In June 1988 he was detained by the police and interrogated over the seizure of several tons of Soviet-made weaponry, but no charges were laid. He subsequently warned the military regime that Australian and New Zealand unions would be asked to take action against Fiji if the harassment of unions continued.

In June 1990 he led the National Farmers Union of Fiji in a boycott of the sugar cane harvest, threatening international action if the army used force. Later that month he led opposition to the military's draft constitution. His home was subsequently attacked by a gang of masked men, who smashed windows and damaged his car. In July 1991 he threatened a national strike by FTUC unions against the regime's proposal to jail those disrupting essential industries; the threat was successful, and the regime's industrial decree was revoked.

=== Leader of Labour Party from 1991 ===
Chaudhry remained active in the Labour Party, and assumed leadership of the party in 1991 from Adi Kuini Bavadra, widow of Timoci Bavadra who had died in 1989. In 1990 a new constitution had been imposed on Fiji by presidential decree. This constitution discriminated against the Indian community in seats allocated to it in the House of Representatives, by not guaranteeing any seats in the Senate and by restricting Indo-Fijians from holding prominent positions in the civil service. Both the NFP and FLP decided to boycott the elections scheduled for May 1992. At the last minute, the NFP decided to contest the election. Mahendra Chaudhry, then had no choice but to lead the FLP into the election. With little time to prepare for the campaign, the FLP managed to win only 13 of the 27 seats reserved for Indians.

After the election, Chaudhry made the controversial decision to support Sitiveni Rabuka in Parliament, in exchange for a promise to review the 1990 Constitution, which Fiji Indians generally regarded as discriminating against them. Rabuka did not follow through on the deal, and Chaudhry and the Labour Party were punished at the parliamentary election of 1994, losing 6 of their 13 seats.

In the mid-1990s, after Rabuka finally did agree to a constitutional review, Chaudhry led campaign to change the electoral system from one based on "communal rolls" (with parliamentary seats reserved by ethnicity, elected by voters enrolled as members of particular ethnic groups), to one based on universal suffrage. Eventually, a compromise formula was agreed upon. Meanwhile, the Rabuka government was losing popularity. His admissions of womanizing, together with allegations of corruption in his administration, alienated him from powerful sections of the electorate. Chaudhry, meanwhile, forged the People's Coalition, an electoral alliance consisting of his Labour Party, and two other parties, both led by indigenous Fijians disaffected by Rabuka's administration. Another indigenous-led party, the Christian Democratic Alliance, joined the coalition later.

=== The 1999 election and the 2000 coup ===
The 1999 election resulted in a landslide win for the People's Coalition, with 58 of the 71 seats in the House of Representatives. The Labour Party won an absolute majority, 37 seats, in its own right. From the outset, voices both within the coalition and without attempted to persuade Chaudhry to forego the office of Prime Minister in favour of an ethnic Fijian, such as his deputy Tupeni Baba or Adi Kuini Speed (by now, the leader of the Fijian Association Party, part of the People's Coalition), but he refused. President Mara reportedly persuaded indigenous Fijian members of the coalition to accept Chaudhry's leadership. Chaudhry was duly appointed Prime Minister on 19 May 1999. To shore up his support among the indigenous community, Chaudhry appointed indigenous Fijians to two-thirds of all ministerial positions.

Few in Chaudhry's caucus had had any previous political experience, a factor that created difficulties for his government. Some Fijian nationalists opposed his administration and stirred up fears in the mostly rural ethnic Fijian population that land reform measures proposed by the Chaudhry government would expropriate their land (notwithstanding constitutional guarantees of indigenous control over five-sixths of the land, which could not be changed without the support of 9 of the 14 chiefly representatives in the Senate). Despite widespread fears of civil unrest, the takeover of the parliamentary complex by George Speight on 19 May 2000 (one year to the day since Chaudhry's appointment as Prime Minister) happened without warning.

More details concerning the overthrow of the Chaudhry government may be found in 2000 Fijian coup d'état and the linked Timeline, Mutinies, and Aftermath.

=== The election of 2001 and aftermath ===
When democracy was restored in 2001, Chaudhry fought a hotly contested election, but was defeated by Laisenia Qarase of the Soqosoqo Duavata ni Lewenivanua (SDL). It is thought that attrition within the Labour Party was a factor in his defeat; high-profile party members like Tupeni Baba had split to form the New Labour Unity Party and he had barely survived a leadership challenge. Mutual enmity between his party and the National Federation Party, the only other political party with significant Fiji-Indian support at that time, prevented a preference-swapping deal. In Fiji's system of transferable voting, such a deal would almost certainly have made him Prime Minister again. (Fiji's electoral laws, modelled at the time on those of Australia, allowed the votes of any two or more candidates in a particular constituency to be combined according to the candidates' preferences; voters could specify a different choice by ranking the candidates numerically in the order of their own preference).

Chaudhry rebuilt the Labour Party, which won several key by-elections throughout 2004. He challenged in the courts the refusal of the Qarase government to include his party in the Cabinet; on 18 July 2003, the Supreme Court ruled in his favour, saying that the exclusion of a party with more than 8 seats in the House of Representatives violated the Constitution. Appeals, counter-appeals, and negotiations delayed the appointment of Labour Ministers to the Cabinet, however. The Supreme Court subsequently ruled in June 2004 that the Labour Party was entitled to 14 out of 30 cabinet posts. Qarase announced that he would implement the order, but his refusal to include Chaudhry himself in any cabinet lineup continued to stall negotiations on the composition of the cabinet. Late in 2004, Chaudhry announced that the Labour Party had decided to remain in opposition for the remainder of the parliamentary term, seeing no way to resolve the impasse without making unacceptable compromises. By remaining outside of the government, the Labour Party was able to distance itself from unpopular decisions made by the administration, and position itself to challenge the ruling SDL for power in 2006.

=== 2006 general election ===
The Fiji Labour Party formed an electoral alliance with the Party of National Unity (PANU) and United Peoples Party (UPP) of Mick Beddoes to contest the 2006 general elections. The SDL Party of Prime Minister Qarase had joined a grand coalition of ethnic Fijian parties to unite the indigenous Fijian vote. During the election, the issue of race was again raised and this galvanised Fijian support behind Qarase. Although the FLP increased its share of votes to 39% and won four more seats to make a total of 31, it was unable to unseat the Qarase Government.

=== Internal dissent ===
Chaudhry was criticised by some prominent members of the FLP, including Krishna Datt and Poseci Bune, for finalising his list of Senate nominees without consulting the Party. The Party threatened action against those members who spoke out publicly against Chaudhry.

Chaudhry's decision that the Labour Party should join the multi-party cabinet (although Chaudhry himself did not join it), was a course for friction within the party. Prime Minister Qarase demanded that all cabinet members vote for the budget or face dismissal, but Chaudhry advised the Labour cabinet members to oppose it because of the increase in VAT tax. In the end four members voted against the budget while others were absent from Parliament.

=== Participation in interim government ===
Following the December 2006 coup that ousted Qarase, Chaudhry accepted the post of Minister of Finance in the interim government formed under Frank Bainimarama in January 2007.

Chaudhry resigned as Minister of Finance on 18 August 2008, along with the Labour Party's two other ministers; Bainimarama took over Chaudhry's portfolio. According to Chaudhry, they did so voluntarily in preparation for the planned general election, although Bainimarama said that "there was a communication from me to [Chaudhry] about him resigning", while dismissing the issue's importance. Prior to the resignation, there had already been widespread rumors that Bainimarama wanted to remove Chaudhry from the government.

Chaudhry defended his record as Finance Minister, saying that "the value of our dollar today would have been about 20 cents had we not taken the measures that we took." While stating that Chaudhry's resignation was a positive development, deposed Prime Minister Qarase was sharply critical of Chaudhry's performance as Finance Minister, saying that he "failed badly as Finance Minister and the economy has shown very little sign of progress. He's just running away from the mess he has created." Qarase also condemned Chaudhry's participation in what he described as "an illegal administration".

Following the April 2009 constitutional crisis, Chaudhry spoke out to criticise the interim government, "def[ying] a press and political crackdown on dissent" in so doing. He described the abrogation of the Constitution as "tragic and unfortunate", and Commodore Bainimarama's leadership as "autocratic and dictatorial", adding that it was now "imperative" to set up multi-party talks – involving Qarase and other leaders – to prepare a speedy restoration of democracy. In October 2010 he was arrested for "meeting with sugar farmers in Rakiraki", in breach of the government's "emergency regulations that ban public meetings". In reporting on the arrest, the BBC described Chaudhry as "one of the main opposition voices" to the Bainimarama government; The Australian subsequently called him one of Bainimarama's "two most effective critics" within Fiji, along with Fiji Times editor-in-chief Netani Rika.

=== Elections in 2014 ===
In April 2014 Chaudhry was convicted of breaching the Exchange Control Act by investing money outside Fiji without informing the Reserve Bank, and fined US$1.1 million. The conviction meant he was ineligible to contest the upcoming 2014 elections. An appeal against his conviction was unsuccessful. Choudhry was nominated as an FLP candidate, but ruled to be ineligible. The Labour Party won only 2.4 percent of the vote, and no parliamentary seats, and Chaudhry joined the leaders of other opposition parties in alleging electoral fraud.

On 3 July 2015, Chaudhry was quoted by Radio New Zealand as announcing his retirement from the leadership of the FLP, having served in that capacity for 23 years. The next day, however, he denied having made such a statement.

In September 2016 he was one of a number of politicians arrested after attending a meeting to discuss the country's constitution. He subsequently accused Fiji of still being a dictatorship. No charges were filed against anyone arrested.

He attempted to contest the 2018 election, but was ruled to be ineligible as a candidate due to his past criminal conviction. An appeal against the ruling was dismissed by the High Court of Fiji.

On 26 July 2021 he was taken in for questioning by Fijian police over comments he had made about a proposed government land bill.

He contested the 2022 election, winning 5760 votes, but did not win a seat as the Labour Party failed to make the 5% threshold.

== Chaudhry's views and policies ==
Chaudhry is known for his combative style of leadership, which has won him both admirers and enemies.

=== Relationship with NFP ===
He remained at loggerheads with the National Federation Party, whose support dropped sharply in 1999, 2001 and 2006 elections, but continued to do well in local government elections. Although it would have been to his advantage to reach a deal on an exchange of preferences with the NFP, competition for support from Indian voters, particularly in the sugar cane growing areas, where FLP and NFP endorsed rival unions, prevented this.

=== Attracting ethnic Fijian vote ===
He failed to make significant inroads into the ethnic Fijian electorate, less than ten percent of whom voted for his party in 2001 or 2006. He was successful, however, in attracting several high-profile ethnic Fijians, such as Poseci Bune, to his party.

=== Brain drain ===
Chaudhry expressed alarm at the high rate of emigration from Fiji, especially of Fiji-Indians, and also of educated indigenous Fijians. "If the trend continues, Fiji will be left with a large pool of poorly educated, unskilled work force with disastrous consequences on our social and economic infrastructure and levels of investment," he said in a statement on 19 June 2005. He blamed the coups of 1987 for "brain drain" which had, he said, had adversely affected the sugar industry, the standard of the education and health services, and the efficiency of the civil service. This was creating a vacuum that would lead to increased levels of crime, drug abuse, and money laundering, he considered. He lamented the "indications of a growing feeling of insecurity, frustration and disaffection among people of all races at the direction in which Fiji appears to be headed," and said that only way to reverse the trend was to elect a government that would provide stability, raise living standards, and create a climate of confidence for investors and opportunities for job seekers.

=== Reconciliation, Tolerance, and Unity Bill ===
From May–June 2005, Chaudhry was at the forefront of a campaign against the government's controversial Reconciliation, Tolerance, and Unity Bill, which proposes to establish a Commission with the power, subject to presidential approval, to compensate victims and pardon perpetrators of the 2000 coup. Speaking on 20 May, he said that a "culture of coups" had developed in Fiji and that it needed to be eradicated. Pardoning persons involved in the earlier coups of 1987 had been a serious mistake, he believed.

=== Bringing Fijians into the mainstream ===
Chaudhry also spoke in favour of bringing more ethnic Fijians into the economic mainstream. He attacked what he called the "divide and rule" policies of Fiji's former British colonial rulers, saying that indigenous Fijians had been isolated from other communities and marginalized economically. This colonial legacy had remained the status quo in society, even since independence in 1970, he maintained. "The status quo is not good for the ordinary Fijians. It is good for the elites in society but not for the ordinary Fijians," Chaudhry said. Positive discrimination programs would not achieve much without a dismantling of the traditional communal mindset, he said. He called for a more individualistic approach to society, based on incentives and appropriate training. He did not believe that modernization would threaten the communal structure of Fijian society. "No you can still fulfil your traditional obligations but the contradiction in the system between the communal approach and the free market approach needs to be addressed," he said. He also insisted that culture could not be allowed to be stagnant.

=== Universal Declaration on Human Rights ===
He condemned Prime Minister Qarase for speaking against the Universal Declaration on Human Rights. Qarase had told a meeting of the Commonwealth Parliamentary Association in Nadi the day before that western-style democracy was an alien concept in Fiji, and that the Universal Declaration of Human Rights was not compatible with Fiji's hierarchical order. Chaudhry countered by saying that Qarase was like a proverbial ostrich with its head in the sand. "The rule of law must apply equally to everyone, irrespective of status in society or class divisions it is this equal application that is the bulwark of modern democracies," he said.

=== Calls for electoral reform ===
Chaudhry periodically called for Fiji's electoral system to be reformed. He said on 20 November 2005 that communal voting, which reserved almost two-thirds of the seats in the House of Representatives for persons registered on ethnic electoral rolls, tended to polarize the nation and gave foundation to politicians with what he called extreme views. He said that any move to change this provision in the Constitution would be supported by the Opposition.

=== Gay rights ===
Chaudhry said on 18 October 2005 that he and the FLP would not support Prime Minister Qarase's attempts to close constitutional loopholes that undermine Fiji's anti-gay laws. Chaudhry said that gay rights were guaranteed by the constitution and must be upheld; the Prime Minister, who needed a two-thirds majority in Parliament to change the constitution, was just wasting his time trying to gain FLP support for the measure, he said.

=== Pro-business policies ===
Chaudhry also protested strongly against Qarase's claims, made at the annual conference of Fiji Employers Federation on 2 September, that the Labour Party was unsympathetic to business and held "a classic left-wing suspicion of ... the profit motive." Chaudhry countered that his party was in fact pro-business and had enacted a number of policies aimed at stimulating economic growth when it was in power. "It was the FLP that was committed to reducing the cost of doing business and started by lowering the cost of utilities, and requested the commercial banks and lending organizations to reduce their fees, charges and interest rates ... that saw the economy record an unprecedented growth of 9.6% in 1999," Chaudhry declared. He said that in the five years of Qarase's leadership, public debt had doubled to F$2.3 billion, that basic infrastructure had deteriorated, and that the economy was on the brink of collapse.

== Controversies ==
Chaudhry has been involved in a number of controversial circumstances over the years, ranging from a manslaughter conviction in 1978 to allegations of misuse of funds as recently as 2005.

=== 1978 conviction ===
In 1978, Chaudhry was involved in a fatal automobile accident and was convicted of failing to stop after a fatal accident. He was sentenced to nine months's imprisonment, but was released on parole after serving 17 days of his sentence.

Prime Minister Qarase drew media attention to Chaudhry's conviction and his almost immediate release, in response to Chaudhry's criticism of government decisions to show leniency towards persons convicted of involvement in the 2000 coup, including former Vice-President Ratu Jope Seniloli and Cabinet Minister Ratu Naiqama Lalabalavu. Qarase accused Chaudhry and his supporters of "living in glasshouses." Chaudhry pointed out that there was no comparison between a premeditated act of treason and a mere traffic offence.

=== Hate speech allegations ===
The Fiji Times reported on 4 September 2005 that Chaudhry and his principal opponent, Prime Minister Qarase, had traded mutual accusations of using hate speech to win political support.

=== Fundraising allegations ===
On 8 December 2005, Chaudhry announced his decision to sue Prime Minister Qarase and Fiji Television for defamation.

Addressing the House of Representatives on 23 November 2005, Prime Minister Qarase alleged that Chaudhry had had money raised for him in the Indian state of Haryana, and called on Chaudhry to reveal what had happened to the money since. On 2 December, he told Parliament that he was aware that money had been raised in his name in Haryana, but denied having authorized the appeal or receiving any of its proceeds. He had raised the issue with then Chief Minister of Haryana Om Prakash Chautala, he said, after being hounded by the media in both Fiji and India. He claimed to have discovered only during his 2005 visit to India that Chautala's record with money is not transparent. "My anger about the whole episode is that Shri Chautala should exploit the feelings of the ordinary and poor folks of Haryana who are emotionally tied to me and to the people of Indian origin in Fiji and play on them a game of deceit for self enrichment," Chaudhry said.

On 30 November, the Government of Haryana state ordered an investigation into the allegations. This followed reports in the Indian media that an Indian political party, the Indian National Lok Dal (INLD), had raised over a million crore (F$376,557) for Chaudhry in 2001, who was then visiting India to raise support following his overthrow in the 2000 coup. According to Webindia, however, the money had not been delivered to him, because of currency regulations, and was instead deposited in the Oriental Bank of Commerce account of the Indo-Fiji Friendship Society. INLD Secretary General Ajay Singh Chautala, whose father Om Prakash Chautala was Chief Minister of Haryana at the time, welcomed the probe. The Haryana authorities were not mollified by his comments, and on 20 December Ranbir Singh Surjewala, the Haryana State Transport and Parliamentary Affairs Minister, called for the passports of Chautala and his two sons to be seized to prevent them from leaving the country.

It was announced on 7 December 2005 that India's Bureau of Investigation had cleared Chaudhry of the allegations.

=== Sugar industry commission allegations ===
In another twist, Qarase had also declared on 25 November that he had unspecified "evidence", which he claimed to have received from India, that a senior member of the FLP had attempted to get commissions from Indian companies that had applied for contracts with respect to the reform of Fiji's sugar industry. He warned Chaudhry that he did not make unfounded allegations, and that he would use the evidence "when the time comes." He later repeated the allegations outside of Parliament. Reacting angrily to the charges, Chaudhry threatened on 4 December to sue Qarase if he failed to apologize for or substantiate his claims. "It is the Prime Minister's duty to provide the evidence. These are serious allegations that have cast a slur on my integrity and reputation," he said. The following day, his son and lawyer, Rajendra Chaudhry, wrote to the Prime Minister giving him three days to apologize or else face a lawsuit. On 7 December, Qarase refused the ultimatum. "I don't apologize for nothing," the Fiji Times reported him as saying.

When the three-day deadline set by Chaudhry expired, he announced on 8 December that he would be suing Qarase as an individual, not as Prime Minister, meaning that Qarase would be unable to use state funds to fight his case. The writ, which named Qarase the first defendant, also named Fiji Television as the second defendant. "Qarase had been reluctant to furnish evidence to substantiate his claims ... The imputations are very serious and a direct question on my integrity and leadership. As such I have had the resort to legal action," Chaudhry declared.

At the scheduled press conference on 9 December, the Prime Minister revealed a confidential letter from Mahendra Chaudhry, written on National Farmers Union (NFU) letterhead in his capacity as General Secretary of the Union, to Charles Walker, chairman of the Fiji Sugar Corporation (FSC), in September 2003. The letter proposed that the NFU purchase shares in the FSC, and stated that he, Senator Anand Singh, and United Consultancy of Auckland, New Zealand, were in talks with "an India-based milling company" to restructure the FSC. According to the Prime Minister, the deal would have transferred shares, that the government was considering selling, not to cane farmers but to their trade union representatives. "The benefit was only to the NFU," Qarase said. Qarase called for an audit of the office of the Leader of the Opposition, saying that it would prove his connections to the Indian company. Equipment in Chaudhry's office had been used to communicate with the company since 2002, he alleged.

Chaudhry derided the revelations as "laughable," and said that they showed no connection whatsoever between himself and India's Exim Bank, or with the Indian government loan. "It was clear that having made wild baseless allegations, the PM was clutching at straws to try and validate his claims," Chaudhry said. "There is absolutely no connection between the loan and a letter that I wrote to PM's steering committee Charles Walker as chairman on sugar industry reforms that Qarase released to the media as his 'proof' that I had received a commission from the loan," he added. Nor did it substantiate, he said, Qarase's claims that he had sought a commission from the Indian companies.

Also on 9 December, FLP Senator and former Attorney-General Anand Singh announced his decision to sue the Indian government and the Head of the Indian Technical Mission, J.J. Bhagat, for compensation for providing the ideas, which he says were adopted without acknowledgement by the Fijian and Indian governments. Prime Minister Qarase had earlier alleged on 5 December that Chaudhry had been a party to the negotiations, and called on the FLP to reveal whether it was involved with Singh's compensation claim.

On 14 December, High Court Justice Anthony Gates dismissed a call from Chaudhry to impose a gag order on Prime Minister Qarase, from making media statements until Chaudhry's lawsuit is heard. Whether the Prime Minister's statements were defamatory was an issue that would have to be resolved in the trial itself, Gates ruled; in the meantime, the court would not interfere with constitutional guarantees of freedom of speech. Chaudhry was ordered to pay F$750 to Qarase and Fiji Television Limited to cover court costs. 9 January 2006 has been set for the hearing of the defamation suit. Chaudhry had failed, Gates said, to provide "credible evidence" that Qarase's words were untruthful, and therefore there was no grounds to prohibit their publication.

On 9 January 2006, Gates announced that he was withdrawing from the case against the Prime Minister and against Fiji Television. He was fully booked judging criminal cases, and had no time to devote to civil suits, he said.

Chaudhry released correspondence on 20 January 2006, citing it as proof that neither he nor his party had tried to collect a commission on Indian loans granted for sugar industry reform. The letter, from the Indian High Commission to Fiji, said that the Exim Bank had confirmed that there was no attempt to secure a commission on the loan, and that the bank never pays commissions on loans. In reply, the Prime Minister said that a number of unanswered questions remained, which would be addressed when the case was heard in court.

Chaudhry announced on 27 February that as of 16 January, he had withdrawn his case against Fiji Television, but not against the Prime Minister.

=== Lawsuit against Daily Post ===
On 5 December 2005, lawyer Rajendra Chaudhry filed a writ against the Fiji's Daily Post, on behalf of his father, Fiji Labour Party (FLP) leader Mahendra Chaudhry. The writ against the government-owned newspaper, whose editor Mesake Koroi is a cousin of Prime Minister Qarase's, concerns what Chaudhry claims are "untrue and malicious" allegations, suggesting a leadership struggle within the FLP. The article in question also claimed that the FLP was no longer the party founded by Timoci Bavadra, Tupeni Baba, and Adi Kuini Speed, but had turned into a hard-line Indian nationalist party.

=== Abuse of privilege investigation ===
It was revealed on 23 December 2005 that Auditor-General Eroni Vatuloka was investigating a complaint from Prime Minister Qarase, accusing Chaudhry of abuse of office. The Prime Minister alleges that Chaudhry has allowed Senator Anand Singh to use office equipment for commercial purposes. Chaudhry has dismissed the Prime Minister's complaint as "frivolous" and "childish."

Fiji Television revealed on 31 January 2006 that the National Farmers Union had put the parliamentary telephone number on a letter faxed to a business client, and that the letter was signed by Shareen Prasad, an employee at the FLP parliamentary office. Chaudhry again refused to comment on the claims, saying they were "trivial."

Pramod Rae, General Secretary of the National Federation Party (NFP), the chief rival of the FLP for the Indo-Fijian vote, called for a thorough investigation into the allegations.

=== Support for Sun Myung Moon ===
Chaudhry was registered as an advisor to the Inter-Religious Federation For World Peace International, an organization affiliated with the Unification Church. The Fijian government abruptly revoked permission for Sun Myung Moon, the group's 85-year-old founder, to visit Fiji, where he was to be the keynote speaker at a conference in Nadi. Dr. Lesi Korovavala, Chief Executive Officer of the Immigration Department described Moon's doctrines as "misleading, repugnant and divisive," said that his visit would not be conducive to "peace, good order, public safety and public morality," and concluded that he was "not a fit and proper person to enter the country."

Chaudhry slammed the government decision, saying that it was treating Moon like a terrorist or a criminal. "Rev Dr. Moon is not a criminal or a terrorist to be treated in this manner," Chaudhry said. "He is a man dedicated to a mission of peace through the promotion of moral and spiritual values. He has founded an organisation that believes in the inculcation of moral and family values to bring about better global understanding and harmony." Chaudhry was joined by Senate President Taito Waqavakatoga, registered as a coordinator of the group, who said that Moon would have made a positive contribution to Fiji.

== Tax allegations ==
Chaudhry was cleared of any taxation breaches after the Inquiry team brought over from Australia studied the evidence and documents provided by the FIRCA, stating that Mr Chaudhry had not breached any taxation laws. The tax assessment by FIRCA with respect to Chaudhry between 2000 and 2006 was carried out in accordance with the Tax Act and other relevant tax laws in Fiji. The inquiry team was headed by Bruce Cowley a partner in the law firm Minter Ellison in Brisbane, Russel Postle a partner in the accounting firm of BDO Kendalls, also in Brisbane, and former deputy PM, Taufa Vakatale.

== Elections contested ==
Year	Constituency	Result
1985	North Central National	lost
1987	North Central National	won
1992	Ba West Indian	won
1994	Ba West Indian	won
1999	Ba Open	won
2001	Ba Open	won
2006	Ba Open	won

== Awards and honours ==
  (India)
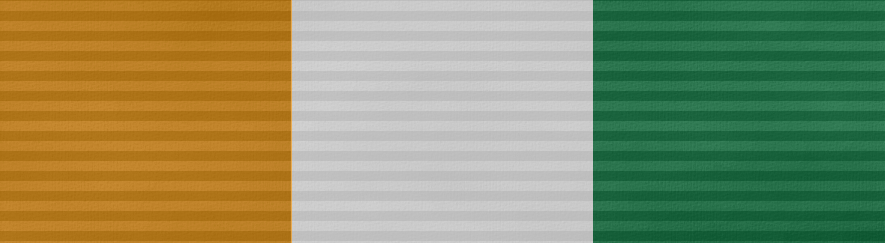
  - Pravasi Bharatiya Samman, 2004
  - Krishna Menon Award, 2018.

== Notes ==
Political offices
Preceded by Sitiveni Rabuka	Prime Minister of Fiji; 1999–2000	Succeeded by Ratu Tevita Momoedonu
Preceded by Mick Beddoes	Leader of the Opposition; 2004–2006	Succeeded by Mick Beddoes
