= New Labour Unity Party =

Fijian political party

The New Labour Unity Party was a Fijian political party, which broke away from the Fiji Labour Party in May 2001. It was founded by Tupeni Baba, a former Deputy Prime Minister and Labour Party stalwart, who had become dissatisfied with Mahendra Chaudhry's leadership and expressed fears that if Chaudhry, who had been deposed in the Fiji coup of 2000, returned as Prime Minister, there could be another coup. Other prominent Fijians associated with the party included Ratu Meli Vesikula.

In the parliamentary election of 2001, the New Labour Unity Party called for the strengthening of the independence of the judiciary, which had been undermined by government defiance. It also advocated a reduction in Value Added Tax, and for its complete removal on essential items. A NLUP government would work to build a non-racialist Fiji in the ethic of "love thy brother," and would ban all forms of unfair discrimination. It also called for a parliamentary code of conduct to end corruption. The party won two of the 45 seats it contested, but Baba himself was defeated. During the campaign, the party had been hurt by revelations that it had received F$200,000 from Peter Foster, a controversial Australian businessman who had been convicted of fraud. Foster actually invested over $1 million in supporting New Labour and ran what was described as a very slick and professional election campaign. Foster said he supported Dr Baba because he saw him as the "Nelson Mandela of the South Pacific."

In the House of Representatives, the NLUP delegation split after the election. Kenneth Zinck joined the government benches and was appointed to the Cabinet as Minister for Labour, Industrial Relations, and Productivity, while Ofa Swann decided to join the Opposition. Most members of the party decided in June 2002 to join with three other parties to form the new Fiji Democratic Party, under the leadership of Filipe Bole. This party dissolved itself in April 2005, in order to join the newly formed National Alliance Party of Fiji, led by Ratu Epeli Ganilau. A rump of the NLUP continues under the leadership of Tomasi Tokalauvere, a trade unionist. The party secretary is Loraini Tulele.

On 5 December 2003, Radio New Zealand reported that the NLUP had expelled Zinck from the party, following his refusal to quit his Cabinet portfolio and join the opposition, saying that his decision breached the party's 2001 election manifesto. Zinck had allegedly ignored several warnings from the party that he would be expelled if he did not resign from the Cabinet, as directed. As of August 2005, however, Zinck is still officially registered by the Fijian Parliament as a member of the NLUP.

On 21 August, Zinck confirmed reports that Tokalauvere was trying to have the party deregistered. He said that Tokalauvere had no authority to do so, however. The Fiji Sun reported on 11 February 2006 that the party had in fact been deregistered, and that Zinck and Swann were both exploring other options for the 2006 election.
