= United Peoples Party (Fiji) =

Political party in Fiji

The United Peoples Party was a minor political party in Fiji. It represented mainly General Electors and multiracial people, and claimed to follow moderate, centrist policies. From 2001 it was led by Mick Beddoes, the sole member elected from the party to the 71-member House of Representatives in the general election.

The party was dissolved in January 2013.

== History of the UPP ==
The party, originally called the United General Party, was formed in the late 1990s by a merger between the General Voters Party and the General Electors Association, formerly the All National Congress (ANC). This followed an earlier move in which ethnic Fijian members of the ANC had left to join the Fijian Association Party. Both groups were fragments of the old Alliance Party, the party which ruled Fiji from 1967 to 1987.

In 2003, the party announced a drive to broaden its base to attract support from Fiji's major ethnic communities, indigenous Fijians and Indo-Fijians. On 2 August, Beddoes announced a decision to rename the party. The name "General" was associated with Fiji's minority communities, he said, and the party wanted a more inclusive name. The party's general secretary, Bruce Rounds, said on 2 November that a growing number of people from all ethnic groups had expressed interest in joining the party, and it had decided, in principle, to field candidates in all 71 constituencies in the general election expected to be held in 2006. The 2004 name change is one step the party has taken to recast itself as a multiracial party.

== Party policies ==
The United Peoples Party has been a vocal critic of the government's legislation to establish a Reconciliation and Unity Commission, a proposed tribunal with the authority (subject to presidential approval) to compensate victims and pardon perpetrators of the coup d'état which deposed the elected government in 2000. Calling the proposal a recipe for disaster which would create a "legal framework" to pardon, at will, anyone convicted of coup-related offence, party leader Mick Beddoes said on 16 May 2005 that it would lead to the prevalence of the law of the jungle and would license any would-be political activist who wanted to engage in coups, to do so. He accused the government of pandering to its junior coalition partner, the Conservative Alliance, to which many of those convicted of coup-related offenses belong. On 14 June, the party announced the beginning of a Yellow Ribbon Campaign to promote a petition aimed at forcing the bill to be withdrawn, or at least significantly amended. On 17 June, Beddoes accused Prime Minister Laisenia Qarase of lying about widespread public support for the bill, claiming that the "small group of dissenters" that the Prime Minister said existed were, in fact, the minority who knew what the bill contained. He said that asking the Fijian people to support the legislation without making them aware of its contents was "a deliberate attempt to mislead the Fijian community."

== Towards 2006 ==
The UPP announced on 28 June 2005 that Josephine Raikuna Williams, the former Mayor of Nadi, would be a candidate for the party at the general election expected to be held in 2006.

The Fijian electoral system employs the so-called alternate ballot, whereby votes cast for low-polling candidates may be transferred to higher-polling candidates according to the ranking specified by the candidate, which may be customized by the individual voter. It is usual, therefore, for parties to negotiate preference deals before elections. Mick Beddoes emphasized on 8 September 2005 that any such agreement with the Fiji Labour Party (FLP) or the National Alliance Party (NAPF) would have to be favourable to UPP candidates. They did not want to be caught, he said, in a situation in which the UPP merely collected votes to benefit other parties. He also said that some executives of the UPP were opposed to making any deals with other parties.

On 18 September, however, Beddoes announced that he was negotiating with FLP about the possibility of an electoral coalition. He also intended to negotiate with the National Alliance Party and possibly the National Federation Party, he said. On 16 October, he said that negotiations between the UPP and the FLP had finalized a deal, and that the UPP executive had endorsed it the day before. "We share similar positions on issues of unemployment, poverty alleviation, health and other areas. It is also based on our belief in the rights of all our citizens and their need for equality under the law," Beddoes said. The two parties signed a memorandum of understanding on 2 December, agreeing to exchange preferences at the 2006 election. The agreement called for a joint manifesto to be drawn up, but left open the possibility of each party contesting any or all of the 71 seats separately, or of fielding joint candidates by mutual agreement. The agreement also left open the possibility of other parties joining the coalition.

Beddoes had earlier announced on 10 October that the party hoped to field a full slate of candidates, comprising 36 indigenous Fijians, 26 Indo-Fijians, and 1 Rotuman, with each of the country's eight principal minority communities represented by one candidate each. Negotiations towards forming a coalition with other parties were ongoing, he said, but no final decision had been taken.

The coalition agreement with the FLP did not exclude deals with other parties, Beddoes emphasized on 15 December 2005. Talks with other parties about electoral pacts were continuing, he said.

The 2006 conference, held on 18–19 March, chose Loto Feifei (North Eastern), David Blakelock (Suva City), and Margaret Rounds (West Central) as the party's three vice-presidents.

The party won 1% of the vote and 2 out of 71 seats in the 2006 election.

== 2006 coup and Dissolution ==
The party opposed the 2006 Fijian coup d'état. However, Deputy Leader Bernadette Ganilau accepted a position in the 2007 interim government, and was asked to resign from the party in response.

In January 2013, the Fijian regime announced new political party registration rules which would make it difficult for parties to contest elections. In response, the party announced that it was shutting down as it could not meet the required number of members. It urged its members to join one of the three remaining major political parties in an effort to shift them towards a more multiracial membership.
