= Ba West (Fijian Communal Constituency, Fiji) =

Former electoral constituency in Fiji

Ba West Fijian Provincial Communal is a former electoral division of Fiji, one of 23 communal constituencies reserved for indigenous Fijians. Established by the 1997 Constitution, it came into being in 1999 and was used for the parliamentary elections of 1999, 2001, and 2006. (Of the remaining 48 seats, 23 were reserved for other ethnic communities and 25, called Open Constituencies, were elected by universal suffrage). The electorate covered the western areas of Ba Province.

The 2013 Constitution promulgated by the Military-backed interim government abolished all constituencies and established a form of proportional representation, with the entire country voting as a single electorate.

== Election results ==
In the following tables, the primary vote refers to first-preference votes cast. The final vote refers to the final tally after votes for low-polling candidates have been progressively redistributed to other candidates according to pre-arranged electoral agreements (see electoral fusion), which may be customized by the voters (see instant run-off voting).

=== 1999 ===
Candidate	Party	First preferences		Final preferences	
Candidate	Party	Votes	%	Votes	%
Meli Bogileka	PANU	4,962	49.27	6,587	65.53
Etuate Tavai	SVT	3,136	31.14	3,465	34.47
Vilive Ravouvou	VLV	1,661	16.49		
Iliesa Ratunavu	NVTL	313	3.11		
Total		10,072	100.00	10,052	100.00
Registered voters/turnout		10,052	–		
PANU win					

=== 2001 ===
Candidate	Party	First preferences		Final preferences	
Candidate	Party	Votes	%	Votes	%
Tomasi Sauqaqa	SDL	2,766	30.21	5,504	60.12
Apisai Tora	BKV	3,311	36.17	3,651	39.88
Meli Bogileka	PANU	1,358	14.83		
Pauliasi Saukuru	NFP	817	8.92		
Isikeli Uluikavoro	Labour	478	5.22		
Uluaisi Rabua	NVTLP	218	2.38		
Malakai Namoto	SVT	207	2.26		
Total		9,155	100.00	9,155	100.00
Registered voters/turnout		9,155	–		
SDL gain from PANU					

=== 2006 ===
Candidate	Party	Votes	%
Meli Saukuru	SDL	9,211	80.05
Taniela Wai	Labour	1,156	10.05
Meli Bogileka	PANU	883	7.67
Pauliasi Namua	NFP	257	2.23
Total		11,507	100.00
Registered voters/turnout		11,507	–
SDL hold			

== Sources ==
- Psephos - Adam Carr's electoral archive
- Fiji Facts
