= Elections in Fiji =

Since becoming independent of the United Kingdom in 1970, Fiji has had four constitutions, and the voting system has changed accordingly.

== Suffrage and representation ==
The Legislative Council elected in 1963 had 37 members. There were 12 elected members, four from each of the Fijian, Indian and European groups chosen on a communal franchise. The Governor also nominated two from each of the communities. There were to be 19 official members. The Legislative Councillors of each race were permitted to select two from their fellows to the Executive Council. Qualifications to register as a voter were as follows:

1. British subject
2. Age of 21 years or over
3. Resident in the colony for a period of, or periods amounting in the aggregate of, not less than twelve months out of the preceding three years.
4. Ability to read and write a simple sentence and sign one’s name in the English language in the case of a European, in either English or Fijian in the case of a Fijian, and for an Indian either in English, Hindi, Urdu, Tamil, Telugu, Gurmukhi, Gujarati or Malayalam. "European" and "Indian" were defined as a person whose father or any of whose male progenitors in the male line was a European or Indian, respectively, while a "Fijian" was defined as "a person whose father or any of whose progenitors in the male line ... was an aboriginal native of the colony, excluding the island of Rotuma and its dependencies."

These definitions firstly disallowed an illiterate adult to vote, secondly permitted some people to choose between ethnic rolls and thirdly made no provision for Rotumans, non-Fijian Pacific Islanders and Chinese to vote.

The Legislative Council elected in 1966 had 36 members. Twenty-five seats represented communal constituencies (nine indigenous Fijians, nine Indians, and seven General Electors (Europeans, Chinese, and other minorities), elected on closed electoral rolls by voters registered as members of their respective ethnic groups. A further nine members were elected from national constituencies – seats allocated ethnically (three for each ethnic constituency) but elected by universal suffrage. The remaining two members were nominated by the Great Council of Chiefs.

- From 1972 through 1987, the House of Representatives had 52 members. Of these, 22 were allocated to indigenous Fijians and another 22 to Indo-Fijians; a further eight were allocated to General Electors (Europeans, Chinese, and other minorities). Of the 22 seats allocated each to indigenous Fijians and Indo-Fijians, 12 were elected from Communal constituencies and 10 from National constituencies. Of the eight seats allocated to General Electors, three were elected from a communal roll and 5 from national constituencies. All members represented single-member constituencies, and were elected by the First past the post system. In the same period, the newly established Senate had 22 members (eight nominated by the Great Council of Chiefs (of whom any three held the power of veto over changes to the country's land laws), seven by the Prime Minister, six by the Leader of the Opposition, and one by the Council of Rotuma).
- In 1992 and 1994, the House of Representatives had 70 members. Thirty-seven seats were allocated to indigenous Fijians, 27 to Indo-Fijians, one to Rotuman Islanders, and 5 to General Electors. All were elected from communal rolls; that is, all members were elected only by voters registered as belonging to their own ethnic group. The First past the post system remained in effect. The Senate in this time had 34 members (24 nominated by the Great Council of Chiefs and 1 by the Council of Rotuma; a further 9 were appointed by the President to represent non-indigenous Fijians).
- From 1999 onwards, the House of Representatives had 71 members. Twenty-five represented open electorates; these members were elected by universal suffrage and could belong to any race. The remaining 46 seats were communal, with 23 being allocated to indigenous Fijians, 19 to Indo-Fijians, one to Rotuman Islanders, and three to General Electors. Instant run-off voting was adopted for these elections. The Senate had 32 members (14 nominated by the Great Council of Chiefs, nine by the Prime Minister, eight by the Leader of the Opposition, and one by the Council of Rotuma).

== Latest elections ==
=== 1966–2006 ===
Note: The following statistics show the number of seats in the House of Representatives won by particular political parties in general elections from 1966 to 2006. The Year at the top of each column links to a main article about the election held that year.

Party	1966	1972	03/1977	09/1977	1982	1987	1992	1994	1999	2001	2006
All Nationals Congress Party	-	-	-	-	-	-	1	1	-	-	-
Christian Democratic Alliance	-	-	-	-	-	-	-	-	3	0	-
Conservative Alliance	-	-	-	-	-	-	-	-	-	6	-
Alliance Party	27	33	24	36	28	24	-	-	-	-	-
Fijian Association Party	-	-	-	-	-	-	-	5	11	0	-
Fijian Nationalist Party	-	-	1	-	-	-	2	-	-	-	-
Soqosoqo ni Vakavulewa ni Taukei	-	-	-	-	-	-	36	33	8	0	0
Fiji Labour Party	-	-	-	-	-	-	13	7	37	27	38
General Voters Party	-	-	-	-	-	-	4	4	-	-	-
National Federation Party	9	19	26	15	22	-	14	20	0	1	0
NFP/FLP coalition	-	-	-	-	-	28	-	-	-	-	-
Nationalist Vanua Tako Lavo Party	-	-	-	-	-	-	-	-	1	0	0
New Labour Unity Party	-	-	-	-	-	-	-	-	-	2	-
Party of National Unity	-	-	-	-	-	-	-	-	4	0	0
United General Party	-	-	-	-	-	-	-	-	2	1	2
Western United Front	-	-	-	-	2	-	-	-	-	-	-
Soqosoqo Duavata ni Lewenivanua	-	-	-	-	-	-	-	-	-	32	36
Independents	-	-	1	-	-	-	-	-	5	2	2
TOTAL	36	52	52	52	52	52	70	70	71	71	71

=== 2014–2022 ===
Note: The following statistics show the number of seats in the Parliament of Fiji won by particular political parties in general elections since 2014.

Party	2014	2018	2022
FijiFirst	32	27	26
Fiji Labour Party	0	0	0
Fiji United Freedom Party	0	-	-
HOPE	-	0	-
National Federation Party	3	3	5
One Fiji Party	0	-	-
People's Alliance	-	-	21
People's Democratic Party	0	-	-
Social Democratic Liberal Party	15	21	3
Independents	0	-	0
TOTAL	50	51	55

== See also ==
- Electoral system of Fiji
- List of political parties in Fiji
