= Apisai Tora =

Fijian politician (1934–2020)

Mohammad Apisai Vuniyayawa Tora (5 January 1934 – 6 August 2020) was a Fijian politician, soldier, and trade unionist. As a labour leader, he was a fighter for dock workers. As a soldier, he served in Malaya and later served as President of the Ex-Servicemen's League.

Tora held a variety of political positions, the last being as a Senator from 2001 to 2006. A convert to Islam, he represented a small minority (numbered in the hundreds) in both the indigenous Fijian and Muslim communities, the great majority of Muslims being Indo-Fijian. On 27 September 2005, he was sentenced to eight months' imprisonment for offenses related to the Fiji coup of 2000.

== Political career ==
Tora had a reputation in Fiji for being something of a chameleon, having championed both Fijian ethnic nationalism and multiculturalism at different times. After returning from military service in Malaya, Tora was president of the North West Branch of the Wholesale and Retail General Workers' Union. With General Secretary James Anthony, Tora led a militant strike of Oil Workers in 1959 that drew on both Fijian and Indo-Fijians for support – but was opposed by the Fijian chiefs. In 1963 Tora stood for the Western seat in the Fijian elections, but lost to Ratu Penaia Ganilau.

He was elected to the House of Representatives for the first time in 1972 as a member of the National Federation Party. In 1977 when he lost his seat, he joined the Alliance Party. Following the defeat of the Alliance in the parliamentary election of 1987, he became a leader of the Taukei Movement opposed to the new government of Timoci Bavadra, which was dominated by Indo-Fijians. In December that year, he joined the interim government formed by Ratu Sir Kamisese Mara, but was dismissed in 1991 for refusing, he claimed, to join the Soqosoqo ni Vakavulewa ni Taukei Party (SVT) that had recently been founded by Mara's wife, Ro Lady Lala Mara. There has been no independent confirmation of Tora's version of why he was removed, however.

In 1992, Tora founded the All Nationals Congress Party (ANC), a multiracial party which merged with the Fijian Association Party (FAP) in 1995. In 1998, he formed the Party of National Unity (PANU), also multiracial, which joined the Fiji Labour Party and the FAP in the People's Coalition, which won a landslide victory in the general election of 1999. Four PANU candidates were elected, but Tora himself lost his seat.

Embittered by his defeat, Tora blamed Indo-Fijian voters for rejecting him. He resigned from PANU and became a vocal opponent of the new Chaudhry government.

Following a coup d'état in May 2000, Tora was appointed Minister for Agriculture, Fishing, Forests, and the Agriculture Land Tenants Act (ALTA) in the interim government formed by Laisenia Qarase in July. After an election to restore democracy in September 2001, Qarase appointed Tora to the Senate, as one of nine prime ministerial nominees in the 32-member Senate.

Tora announced his retirement from active politics on 28 February 2006. Fiji Village revealed that in a letter to People's National Party President Meli Bogileka, Tora had tendered his resignation as vice-president of the party, and also withdrew his membership of the party. He said that he would continue to speak out on areas of concern, however. These included what he called the "insubordination" of the Military, adding that repairing the damage done to the reputation of the Army would take a long time.

The Fiji Sun reported the following day that he had made the decision to retire following the recent death of his wife. He was now 72, he said in his resignation letter, and felt that the negative aspects of his political life now outweighed the positive.

Tora's opponents, including Lekh Ram Vayeshnoi of the Fiji Labour Party (FLP) and Raman Pratap Singh of the National Federation Party (NFP) were quoted in the Fiji Sun on 16 March 2006 as welcoming Tora's retirement. They expressed their respect for the man despite fundamental disagreements with his nationalist views.

== Alleged involvement in the 2000 coup ==
In August 2005, Tora spoke out to defend his role in the Taukei Movement of 2000. He insisted that it was never the intention of the movement to overthrow the Chaudhry government, but another group had taken advantage of its march to engage in vandalism.

In an angry reaction on 24 August, Commodore Bainimarama accused Tora of using fear to influence voters in the upcoming election by threatening instability if indigenous Fijian parties do not win. Bainimarama said that Tora himself has a case to answer for his activities during the 2000 crisis. 'In 2000, Apisai Tora and a group of people at the Fijian Holdings boardroom, requested me as commander of the Military to remove Tui Vuda, Ratu Iloilo – whilst he was just a week in the Presidency," Bainimarama alleged. "If he claims to be fighting for indigenous Fijian rights then he should explain to the general public why he tried to remove the Tui Vuda who is a chief of his province."

Bainimarama also accused Tora of using smokescreens to deceive the people. "Senator Tora is using land and fisheries issues to stir up emotions in the people ... (but) the land always was Fijians' and will remain theirs," he asserted. He said that Tora and others like him were lying to the people and had to be stopped.

Tora immediately denied the allegations. He said that the meeting to which the Commander referred took place before Iloilo's inauguration as president, not after, and that Commodore Bainimarama must be confused. He said he was preparing a written document to defend himself, a statement that would "surprise" the commander, he said.

Meanwhile, Tora was harshly criticised for his alleged involvement in the plot against President Iloilo by fellow-Senator Ponipate Lesavua (of the opposition Labour Party) and by Ratu Epeli Ganilau, founder of the National Alliance Party, former Chairman of the Great Council of Chiefs, and son of the late President Ratu Sir Penaia Ganilau. Both expressed shock at the revelations, and Ganilau said they proved that the 2000 coup had nothing to do with indigenous Fijian rights and everything to do with selfish personal agendas, for which the Fijian people were unwittingly used.

In a statement on 29 August, Tora emphatically denied having taken part in any meeting at the Fijian Holdings boardroom where the proposal to remove President Iloilo was allegedly discussed. Tora said that the Military commander himself had forced the resignation of Iloilo's presidential predecessor, Ratu Sir Kamisese Mara on 29 May 2000, and that it was therefore "absurd" for him to accuse others of plotting against Iloilo. He said that Commodore Bainimarama was calling the reputation of the Military into disrepute, and called on him to resign and allow "a real army man" to take over and restore the honour of the Military.

Army spokesman Lieutenant Colonel Orisi Rabukawaqa rejected Tora's criticism of Bainimarama, saying that the commander had the full support of his troops.

On 31 August, Tora defended his racial rhetoric, saying that racial politics was a fact of life in Fiji and that people needed to face that reality. Meanwhile, Prime Minister Qarase came out supporting Tora's version of the alleged plot against President Iloilo in 2000. Qarase said that he was at the meeting at which the request to remove Iloilo was alleged to have been made, and that no such question had ever come up.

=== Unlawful assembly conviction ===
In a separate but related matter, Tora appeared in court with 12 others on 5 September, on charges of unlawful assembly. The charge was related to their involvement in the illegal takeover of a military checkpoint on Queens Highway in the Nadi suburb of Sabeto, on 13–14 July 2000. Tora was initially acquitted on such charges on 3 November 2004, with Magistrate Syed Shah finding inconsistencies in police statements and court evidence. The Director of Public Prosecutions filed an appeal which was adjourned until 19 September, when High Court Justice John Connors overturned Tora's previous acquittal, along with that of his 12 accomplices. Connors set the last week of September for their sentencing, and remanded each of the accused on F$500 bail. Defence lawyer Iqbal Khan announced that he would prepare an appeal to be filed soon after the sentencing.

On 26 September, Justice Connors remanded Tora and his 12 accomplices in custody, pending sentencing at 9.30am the following morning. Tora's lawyer, Iqbal Khan, said that Tora had been leading a peaceful protest to call for the paramount chief of his district, Ratu Josefa Iloilo, to be appointed President. Moreover, the country was in political turmoil at the time and the accused had later reconciled with the military according to Fijian cultural norms, Khan said.

Khan told the court that Tora had agreed that he should face the full brunt of the law for his actions, and was prepared as a leader of the Sabeto and Natalau villages in Nadi to take responsibility for the actions of his accomplices, who were bound by Fijian protocol to obey his orders as their Turaga ni Yavusa (tribal chief). He quoted Tora as requesting that "any punishment meted out by the court be directed towards me and me only and not to any other of my co-accused." He appealed, however, for leniency to be shown to Tora on account of his old age.

On 27 September, Connors sentenced Tora to an eight-month prison sentence, and his accomplices to four months each. Connors said that a fine and a suspended prison sentence would not be appropriate, given the seriousness of the offence committed. He also said that as a traditional leader of the Fijian people, Tora was obliged to set a good example, which he had failed to do during the 2000 crisis. "Those with the authority to lead have an obligation to lead in the right direction and not to encourage others to break the law," Connors said.

State lawyer Samuela Qica had told the court the previous day that the maximum sentence for unlawful assembly was twelve months.

Lawyer Iqbal Khan applied for bail, pending an appeal against Tora's conviction, but Justice Connors refused the application on 28 September. On 1 October, Khan lodged an appeal against the refusal with the Court of Appeal, citing the ill health of Tora and two of his co-accused.

Despite his imprisonment, Tora remained on the Parliamentary payroll, however, as a prison sentence of less than 12 months did not automatically cause him to forfeit his seat. If he missed two consecutive sessions, however, his political fate would be in the hands of Senate President Taito Waqavakatoga, who was empowered to declare his seat vacant for his nonattendance.

On 29 September, Prisons Commissioner Aisea Taoka said that owing to his age and the state of his health, Tora would not be made to do any work at Natabua Prison, where he was being held.

=== Parole granted ===
Lawyer Iqbal Khan announced on 14 October that he had filed an application on Tora's behalf for him to be released on a compulsory supervision order (CSO). Whether to grant the request is at the discretion of the Minister for Justice.

On 18 November it was announced that the CSO had been granted on health grounds and that Tora had been released to serve the remainder of his sentence extramurally.

Tora's release was strongly criticised by Military spokesman Captain Neumi Leweni. Citing previous instances of persons convicted and imprisoned on coup-related charges being released ahead of time, Leweni said that Tora's parole had all the appearances of history repeating itself. He said the release raised unspecified "national security" concerns, and also questioned the timing, which coincided with the discovery that Fijian agents, former Military personnel, had been involved in illegally arming and training a militia on the island of Bougainville, in Papua New Guinea. Such revelations showed that "undercurrents" of the 2000 events were still alive, he asserted.

Opposition Leader Mahendra Chaudhry, however, defended the release. Chaudhry, one of Tora's fiercest adversaries, said he accepted that Tora was in poor health and should be released on compassionate grounds.

National Alliance Party President Ratu Epeli Ganilau declined to comment, saying that he needed first to clarify the grounds on which the release had been approved.

== Later controversies ==
In mid-2004, Tora clashed with Police Commissioner Andrew Hughes, taking offence at a speech Hughes had made at the annual general meeting of the Pacific British Chamber of Commerce in Suva on 24 August. He said that as an Australian, Hughes should remember how his country had oppressed its Aborigine population to the point of genocide and had denied voting rights to many of them as recently as 1967. It was inappropriate, he told the Senate, for an Australian to come to Fiji and attack the indigenous population. "Too often these days when people speak out on certain matters there are attempts to intimidate or muzzle them and breach their rights by throwing allegations of racism or making hate speeches," he said. "I would like to warn Mr Hughes to be careful," he declared. "To do his own work properly and not to tread where angels fear to tread." He went on to say that the 1997 Constitution was "nothing less than a fraud on the Fijian people."

In 2005, Tora came out strongly in favour of the government's controversial Reconciliation, Tolerance, and Unity Bill, which aims to establish a commission empowered to compensate victims and pardon perpetrators of the 2000 coup, and has harshly attacked its detractors. In a Senate speech on 24 August 2004, he clashed publicly with the Military commander Commodore Frank Bainimarama (an implacable opponent of the legislation), accusing the Military of "playing politics." He also questioned how, in view of the Auditor General's report that the Military was unable to operate within its budget, it had obtained funding for its nationwide campaign against the bill, which involved soldiers visiting villages to educate the people on the Military's perception of it.

Tora attacked both the Labour Party and its leader, Mahendra Chaudhry, for "creating political instability in the country." He said that Chaudhry was interfering with land legislation by coming between the President and the Native Land Trust Board. He said that if the Labour Party was serious about promoting good governance and the rule of law, they should denounce the political activism of the Military. "It is disgraceful that NGOs, Labour Party and the media appear to condone and turn a blind eye to the army's actions. Their silence is a mark of guilt. They are guilty of failing to call the army to order over threats to the security of the country," Tora declared.

Tora strongly supported moves to form a grand coalition of ethnic Fijian-dominated parties to contest the election planned for 2006. "Anyone with political common sense know that stability and peace will be assured in this country that the government is led by Fijians and has majority," he asserted.
