= Conservative Alliance-Matanitu Vanua =

- Leader: Naiqama Lalabalavu
- President: Tanoa Cakobau
- General Secretary: Josefa Dimuri
- Founded: 2001
- Dissolved: 17 February 2006
- Merged into: Soqosoqo Duavata ni Lewenivanua
- Ideology: Christian democracy; Christian right; Fijian nationalism; National conservatism; Social conservatism
- Political position: Right-wing

The Conservative Alliance (Matanitu Vanua in Fijian) was a right-wing political party in Fiji, and a member of the ruling coalition government. It was commonly known as the CAMV, a combination of the initials of its English and Fijian names. At its annual general meeting on 17 February 2006, the party voted to dissolve itself and merge with its coalition partner, the Soqosoqo Duavata ni Lewenivanua (SDL). The President of the party at the time of its dissolution was Ratu Tanoa Cakobau, a Bauan chief, while Ratu Josefa Dimuri served as General Secretary. For legal reasons, Parliamentary members of the disbanded party maintained a separate caucus in the House of Representatives, under the leadership of Ratu Naiqama Lalabalavu, until the end of the parliamentary term, on 27 March 2006.

== Party founding ==
The Conservative Alliance was publicly launched at Furnival Park in Toorak, Suva, on 15 June 2001 by defectors who broke away from the Soqosoqo ni Vakavulewa ni Taukei, which had governed the country from 1992 to 1999, when it lost the general elections held that year. As part of its founding ideology, the party emphasized that the offices of President and Prime Minister should be reserved for indigenous Fijians, and that Christianity should be constitutionally established as the country's official religion. Among those attending the launch was the Rev. Tomasi Kanailagi, President of the Methodist Church. Ratu Epenisa Cakobau, a Kubuna chief, was appointed President of the party, with Ratu Naiqama Lalabalavu of Tovata and Ro Alivereti Tuisawau of Burebasaga as the two Vice-Presidents, thus representing at the apex of the party the leading chiefly clans from the three confederacies to which all Fijian chiefs belong. Ratu Josefa Dimuri was appointed General Secretary of the party.

== The 2001 election ==
George Speight, who led the civilian coup d'état against the elected government of Mahendra Chaudhry in May 2000, joined the new party, as did many of his supporters. In the parliamentary election held to restore democracy in August 2001, the party fielded candidates in 36 of the 71 electorates. Six of their candidates were elected to the House of Representatives, including Speight. (Unable to take his seat due to his imprisonment on treason charges, Speight was subsequently expelled from Parliament for nonattendance, and his brother, Samisoni Tikoinasau, won the ensuing byelection to fill the vacancy).

To secure a legislative majority, the Soqosoqo Duavata ni Lewenivanua (SDL) of Prime Minister Laisenia Qarase forged a coalition agreement with the Conservative Alliance. The party initially insisted on Speight's release from jail as the price of its participation in the government, but later dropped this demand. The then leader of the party, Ratu Rakuita Vakalalabure, was appointed Deputy Speaker of the House of Representatives, and two members of the caucus were appointed to the Cabinet. Ratu Naiqama Lalabalavu became Minister for Lands and Natural Resources, and Isireli Leweniqila became Minister for Youth, Employment Opportunities, and sport. As part of a deal brokered between the military and the insurrectionists, Ratu Jope Seniloli, another party stalwart, had already been appointed Vice-President in September 2000, following the end of the rebellion.

=== Alleged FLP offer ===
At the annual general meeting held to dissolve the party on 17 February 2006, coup-convict Simione Drole claimed that the Fiji Labour Party had made an offer to the CAMV after the 2001 election. All six CAMV parliamentarians, including coup frontsman George Speight, would be given Cabinet office; one of them would be offered the post of Prime Minister. All prisoners held on coup-related offences would also be freed in return for CAMV support, Fiji Live quoted Drole as saying. "This information was relayed to us on Nukulau by CAMV lawyer Kitione Vuataki," Drole told the meeting. He went on to claim that the CAMV had made the very difficult decision to refuse the offer; the prospect of freedom was tempting, he said, but the priority was to ensure that an ethnic Fijian government held office.

FLP leader Mahendra Chaudhry rejected Drole's claims as "utter lies." "Drole should have his head examined," he said.

== Arrest of CAMV members ==
In 2004, a number of high-profile members of the Conservative Alliance were arrested and charged with treason for their roles in the 2000 coup. On 6 August 2004, Vice-President Seniloli and Deputy Speaker Vakalalabure were convicted and sentenced to terms of four and six years' imprisonment respectively. Youth, Employment, and Sports Minister Leweniqila was acquitted; Justice Nazhat Shameem accepted his defence that he had been coerced into taking an illegal oath of office during the coup.

Anxious to retain the support of his coalition partner, and shore up his electoral base in the Bau-Tailevu region, in which Seniloli is an influential chief, Prime Minister Qarase said that he was "dismayed by the severity of the sentences" handed down. His government indicated, however, that it would not interfere with the due process of law. On 29 November 2004, however, Attorney General Qoriniasi Bale announced that the government had decided to parole Seniloli on health grounds, in return for his resignation.

A similar scenario unfolded in the trial of Ratu Lalabalavu, the party leader, and Senator Ratu Josefa Dimuri, also a party member. On 3 April 2005, Lalabalavu and Dimuri were convicted of unlawful assembly for their role aiding and abetting the 2000 coup by visiting rebels at the Sukanaivalu Barracks on 4 July that year, and were sentenced to eight months' imprisonment. They were released on parole after serving just eleven days of their sentences.

Opposition politicians charged that the release of Seniloli, Lalabalavu, and Dimuri was for political reasons, as the six votes of the Conservative Alliance are needed to maintain the government's parliamentary majority. The military also criticized their release. This led to a series of exchanged in April 2005, with the Conservative Alliance accusing the military of meddling in politics, and the military in turn charging that Alliance politicians included many who had "created havoc" in the 2000 coup. In a strongly worded statement on 25 April 2005, army spokesman Captain Neumi Leweni declared, "The RFMF would like to remind the CAMV that they were the very people who created the havoc from which the country is still trying to recover."

Trials of persons implicated in the 2000 coup, many of them Conservative Alliance members, are continuing.

== Controversies, 2005-2006 ==
A power struggle between the President and General Secretary of the party took place in September 2005. On 30 July 2005, Cakobau signed an agreement with four other parties to establish an electoral coalition of parties supported mostly by indigenous Fijians to contest the general election scheduled for 2006. Sivo opposed the decision, and said that Cakobau had acted without proper authority. Each subsequently called on the other to resign, and on 9 August, Cakobau said that he expected Sivo to be replaced by his predecessor, Ratu Josefa Dimuri. Sivo countered that he had no intention of relinquishing his position, and said that he could be only removed if the party judged him unfit for the post. He reiterated on 16 September that he would not stand aside for Dimuri. Responding to a letter that Cakobau had sent to Dimuri reinstating him, Sivo said that Cakobau had no such powers. He accused him of taking advantage of the famous Cakobau name to make unilateral decisions that were beyond his authority.

The public disagreement between Cakobau and Sivo appeared to be related to a wider debate about the policies and effectiveness of the party as a member of the ruling coalition. Without naming particular individuals, Sivo criticized certain colleagues on the CAMV executive on 17 September of being too subservient to the Soqosoqo Duavata ni Lewenivanua, the dominant partner in the ruling coalition. The party should have pushed for the Reconciliation, Tolerance, and Unity Bill three years ago, Sivo said. The controversial legislation, promoted by the government in 2005, proposed to establish a commission empowered to compensate victims and pardon perpetrators of the 2000 coup, many of whom were supporters of the CAMV.

== Policies ==
The CAMV contested the 2001 election on a platform calling for a greater emphasis on indigenous rights and the proclamation of Christianity (the faith of most ethnic Fijians, but relatively few Indo-Fijians), as the official religion of Fiji. Officially, the party accepts the 1997 Constitution, calling it "a workable document," but in practice many of its elected representatives have strongly criticised it.

Despite its strongly nationalist image, reinforced by the arrest and conviction of many of its members for participation in the 2000 coup, the CAMV claims to espouse nonracial policies. The party President, Ratu Tanoa Cakobau, said on 8 June 2005 that anybody respected by the population could be Prime Minister, regardless of his or her race or status. He said this in response to a comment from Poseci Bune, Deputy Leader of the Fiji Labour Party, that the country should be ready for a non-indigenous Prime Minister.

== Merger with SDL ==
Party President Ratu Tanoa Cakobau announced on 9 February 2006 that the party would contest Fijian communal and open constituencies in the upcoming election. In another development, however, it was announced on 16 February 2006 that the party would be deregistering, in order to merge with the Soqosoqo Duavata ni Lewenivanua (SDL) ahead of the elections.

Fiji Television reported on 20 February that a letter alleged to have been written by Ratu Tanoa Cakobau had requested that the six CAMV parliamentarians be endorsed, unopposed, as SDL candidates. The SDL confirmed having received letter, written in Fijian and addressed to Prime Minister Qarase and to the SDL President, but Cakobau said that some portions of it were not authentic; his name had been written differently from the way he uses it official correspondence, he said.

The Prime Minister responded that all candidacies for the SDL were open, and that there would be no automatic endorsement of candidates, ex-CAMV or otherwise. All would have to go through the required selection procedure.

The next day, Fiji Live revealed that in addition to the six parliamentarians, five other CAMV figures were seeking endorsement as SDL candidates.

Radio New Zealand quoted Party President Ratu Tanoa Cakobau as saying on 28 February that the party had sacrificed little in its merger with the SDL. The party had abandoned its goal of freeing all coup convicts as long ago as 2002, he claimed. "We had to reconsider everything, in the beginning we were all out for everything, but then we realised that there’s something called the law that we had to respect, we had to follow. And through that process most of my party members, except myself, went to jail," Cakobau said.

The merger was not quite finalized until 3 July 2006, when the party was officially deregistered. General Secretary Ratu Rakuita Vakalalabure said on 28 February that the party was seeking legal advice after questions had been raised concerning the legality of the merger; his successor as General Secretary, Ropate Sivo, had said that CAMV parliamentarians could not legally remain in office if their political party was dissolved. Official deregistration, therefore, would likely have to await the end of the current parliamentary session, a stance he reiterated on 3 March. Sivo, for his part, told Fiji Live that he planned to meet Opposition Leader Mahendra Chaudhry to discuss the matter. On 20 February, however, Prime Minister Qarase said that there was no question of the six CAMV parliamentarians being disqualified. Despite the dissolution of the party, they would continue to sit under the auspices of the CAMV, he said.

The Fiji Sun reported on 10 March that CAMV parliamentarian and lawyer Niko Nawaikula had inquired of the Supervisor of Elections about the procedures to follow for deregistering the party.

=== Factors influencing the merger ===
The decision to deregister the party was formalized at the party's annual general meeting the next day. Despite some dissent, the motion was passed on a voice vote. Ratu Naiqama Lalabalavu told the meeting that in accordance with Fijian protocol, President Ratu Josefa Iloilo had been informed of the decision, as had the chiefs of Vanua Levu, Naitasiri, and Tailevu - the areas where the party has the most support. The party executive called on all indigenous-led parties to follow their lead and unite under the banner of the SDL, in order to present the electorate with a united front to guarantee continued indigenous national leadership. Lalabalavu said that the party was concerned about continued imprisonment of persons convicted of the Fiji coup of 2000, many of them CAMV supporters, but considered that the SDL-led government was addressing that matter through its Reconciliation, Tolerance, and Unity Bill.

The Fiji Live news service claimed on 19 February that financial considerations may have played a role in the decision to disband the CAMV. The SDL had reportedly donated F$15,000 to pay the legal fees of prominent citizens, many of them CAMV supporters, who were implicated in the 2000 coup a point highlighted at the CAMV meeting. The party leader, Ratu Naiqama Lalabalavu, was also quoted as telling opponents of the merger that their failure to contribute to the party's coffers had left it with insufficient funds to continue as a viable party. Party treasurer Jone Kauvesi concurred, saying that the CAMV bank account of F$36,351.07 on 26 May 2004 had been boosted to F$50,713.36 on 7 July by the SDL donation, but by February 2006 his had been depleted and only F$3235.31 remained. The bulk of the fund - over F$31,000 had gone in legal fees, Kauvesi said, with the Abhay Singh and Associates legal firm alone being paid F$7,400. Travel, funeral expenses, advertising in newspapers, byelection campaigns, and meetings had accounted for the rest.

The SDL appeared to see the merger from a different point of view from the CAMV. According to a Radio New Zealand report on 18 February, SDL campaign director Jale Baba said that the CAMV had dissolved of its own accord and joined the SDL, not that the two parties had merged. "In fact there’s a misconception that there’s a merger between the two parties. What has happened is that the CAMV has decided to wind up that party and for them to become members of the SDL party," Baba said.

=== Reaction to the merger ===
The Fiji Sun quoted former Prime Minister Sitiveni Rabuka as hailing the merger as "the way forward for the Fijian people." Nationalist Vanua Tako Lavo Party general secretary Viliame Savu, however, condemned the merger.

Fiji Labour Party leader Mahendra Chaudhry said that the merger could misfire. He doubted that all CAMV supporters would transfer their allegiance to the SDL, thinking it more likely that some would move to other parties at election time. United Peoples Party leader Mick Beddoes similarly judged the decision to be unwise. Fiji Village quoted him on the 19th as saying that the merger could further polarize Fiji's ethnic communities.

The Soqosoqo ni Vakavulewa ni Taukei (SVT), from which the CAMV originally broke away, said on 23 February 2006 that not all CAMV members supported the merger with the SDL. Ema Druavesi, General Secretary of the SVT, told the Fiji Village news service that the door was open for former CAMV members to join the SVT.

People's National Party (PNP) General Secretary Meli Bogileka also criticized the merger, and said that the PNP was reconsidering its position in the Grand Coalition Initiative Group.

In a statement written in Fijian and released on 22 February, the Military criticized the merger as a sign of increasing ethno-nationalism, which it described as a threat to the country's long-term stability. For the SDL to accept the CAMV members into its ranks was a betrayal of the trust the Military had invested in Qarase when appointing him Prime Minister in 2000 and supporting him subsequently, Fiji Live (23 February) reported the statement as saying. The 23 February edition of the Fiji Times quoted Rabukawaqa as saying that certain political elements would stop at nothing to pursue their personal political ambitions. 'They wish to continue to keep the masses in abject poverty so that they can be beguiled by the continued lie of foreigners wanting to take their land from them," Rabukawaqa said. Rabukawaqa said that nationalism was a good thing when it was state based, but could only lead to hatred and instability if based on ethnicity.

== A new CAMV? ==
CAMV members objecting to the merger with the SDL included Ropate Sivo, the former General Secretary. He told Fiji Village that he was seeking legal advice on whether the vote to dissolve the party had been conducted legally. He had visited Metuisela Mua, Eroni Lewaqai and Viliame Sousouwai in prison (where they are serving for coup-related offences) and had been advised by them to pursue legal action, he said. George Speight and the former leader, Ratu Rakuita Vakalalabure were also adamantly opposed to the merger, he claimed.

Sivo reiterated his opposition to the merger on 27 February, saying that it breached the constitution of the party. Only the management board could authorize a dissolution, and Tailevu was the only Province represented at the meeting, the Fiji Sun quoted him as claiming. The move was a private agreement between the SDL and Ratu Naiqama Lalabalavu, he said, adding that many who disagreed with the merger were remaining silent only because of their traditional obligation to Lalabalavu as a Paramount Chief. He made a strong attack on Prime Minister Qarase, calling on him to resign, and mooted the establishment of a new party under the old CAMV label.

Sivo rejected claims made by General Secretary Ratu Josefa Dimuri that the party had begun in the north of the country and largely built by Lalabalvu, Isireli Leweniqila, and himself. On the contrary, Sivo claimed that the groundwork had been laid by Vakalalabure, his brother Ratu Tevita, and himself; Sivo had provided part of his own restaurant in Suva for a party office, he claimed. "These people joined the bandwagon when it was up and running. That is why they don’t have the foresight to complete the work we have started, and that is to fulfill the aspirations of the Fijian people and the release of our brothers in jail," the Fiji Sun (1 March) quoted him as saying. He accused Dimuri of failing to read a letter at the meeting held to dissolve the party; Dimuri countered by saying that no such letter had been received. Sivo affirmed his belief in the ideals articulated by the Speight-led Taukei Cabinet on 19 May 2000, saying that they would never die.

Countering Sivo's version, the Fiji Times (2 March) quoted Dimuri as saying that the meeting to dissolve the party had been attended by over four hundred cadres and that the decision to join the SDL had been nearly unanimous. He rejected Sivo's claims about the origins of the party, saying that he personally had registered the party in Labasa. He also denied that George Speight had opposed the decision, saying that if he had objected to the dissolution of the party, he would have informed his brother and CAMV Cabinet Minister Samisoni Tikoinasau, who visited him regularly in prison.

Fiji Live quoted a Fiji Sun report on 13 June 2006 as saying that Sivo had announced plans to revive the party, with a view to campaigning for the release of George Speight and other parties to the 2000 coup.

== Revival ==
On 9 September 2008, former members of the Conservative Alliance applied to re-register the party with the Electoral Commission so it can contest the next election. The new incarnation of the party will be led by Ropate Sivo.
