= Lio 'On Famör Rotuma Party =

Former political party in Fiji

Lio 'On Famör Rotuma or LFR (meaning "Voice of the Rotuman People" in Rotuman) was a political party in Fiji. Formed in 1999, it sought to represent the interests of the Rotuman people in their main representative constituency, the Rotuman Communal Constituency, which, under the 1997 Constitution, elected a Member of Parliament in the House of Representatives for all people of Rotuman descent across the nation of Fiji. Although the party never won a seat in Parliament, it tightly contested the parliamentary elections of 1999 and 2001.

The party faced some controversy over its short history, primarily related to the mismanagement of funds and donations, and having lost some face did not offer a candidate in the 2006 election.

== See also ==
- Politics of Fiji
