= Jonetani Galuinadi =

Fijian politician

Jonetani Galuinadi was a Fijian politician, who served in the Cabinet from 2001 to 2006 as Minister for Agriculture.

In the election held in September 2001, he won the Nadroga Open Constituency for the Soqosoqo Duavata ni Lewenivanua (SDL), defeating the incumbent Inoke Kadralevu of the Fiji Labour Party, and was subsequently appointed to the Cabinet. He retired from politics at the parliamentary election held on 6–13 May 2006.

On 15 December 2006, Galuinadi was dismissed from the board of the Ports Corporation and the Ports Terminal Limited by the military junta which had seized power on 5 December.

Galuinadi died in February 2009 aged 65. He is survived by his wife Kinisimere Galuinadi, two sons (Jale and Jonetani Galuinadi Jnr) and four grandchildren.
