= People's National Party (Fiji) =

Former Fijian political party

The People's National Party (PNP) is a former Fijian political party.

== Party history ==
The history of the PNP is representative of the many complex about-turns of Fijian politics: it was formed by a merger of the Party of National Unity (PANU) and the Protector of Fiji (BKV), after PANU member Meli Bogileka had previously split off from it. Both parties were formally deregistered on 23 August 2005. They drew most of their support from Ba Province, and one of their stated goals in uniting was to give the people of Ba a single party to represent their interests in the political arena.

The merger soon began to unravel. On 25 November 2005, Senator Ponipate Lesavua announced that he would play a role in an attempt to revive and reregister the defunct PANU, on the basis of what he said was public demand. The Fiji Times reported on 11 January 2006 that the party had been reregistered. In another development, Lesavua said on 23 January that the BKV had also seceded from the PNP and had signed an agreement to merge with PANU.

In a further twist to the saga, the PNP, the BKV, and PANU decided on 5 March to re-merge, this time under the PANU banner, with Ratu Sairusi Nagagavoka, the Tui Ba (Paramount Chief of Ba), as its leader. On 2 March, Fiji Live revealed that officials of the PNP and PANU had met over the weekend at the village of Sorokoba, Ba, to formalize a merger of their two parties. He also told Fiji Television that he hoped the Grand Coalition would understand the reasons for the merger. "In politics there are no permanent enemies and no permanent friends but we hope they understand and they will be informed of the move," he said. He cited concern at the merger of the Soqosoqo Duavata ni Lewenivanua (SDL) with the nationalistic Conservative Alliance (CAMV) as a factor in the decision.

Meli Bogileka, a former Cabinet Minister, was General Secretary of the PNP at the time of its dissolution. He announced on 7 March that a letter would be sent to the Grand Coalition for Fiji, an alliance of ethnic Fijian parties to which the PNP had belonged, informing them that the party no longer existed.

== Background to the merger ==
On 24 June 2005, Bogileka announced that the party would concentrate on communal constituencies reserved for ethnic Fijians. (Under Fiji's complex electoral system, 46 of the 71 seats in the House of Representatives are reserved for voters registered on closed ethnic roles; 23 are allocated to indigenous Fijians). The party was open to contesting other seats also, Bogileka said, but considered it important to prioritize. He said the party wanted to negotiate electoral alliances with other ethnic Fijian parties to secure vote-transfer agreements under Fiji's instant-runoff voting system, and on 13 August it signed Memorandum of Understanding with five other parties, confirming an agreement made on 31 July, to contest the general election scheduled for 2006 as part of a coalition.

Before its merger into PANU, the party planned to contest the Fijian communal constituencies of Serua, Nadroga Navosa, North West Urban, Bua, Ra, Ba West and Ba West, and the open electorates of Navosa, Nadroga, and Tavua, according to Bogileka. The so-called Open electorates, unlike the communal constituencies, are elected by universal suffrage.

== Reaction from the Grand Coalition ==
The Grand Coalition for Fiji, of which the PNP had been a member, said on 9 March that it was still in the dark about why the PNP had withdrawn and merged into PANU. Grand Coalition President Tomasi Vakatora said the move was unexpected and disappointing, and expressed doubts about whether the newly merged party would win any seats in the upcoming election.
