= Tomasi Sauqaqa =

Fijian politician

Tomasi Namua Sauqaqa is a former Fijian politician.

In the election held in September 2001, he won the Ba West Fijian Communal Constituency for Interim Prime Minister Laisenia Qarase's party, the Soqosoqo Duavata ni Lewenivanua (SDL). He was subsequently appointed Assistant Minister for Health. In this capacity, he assisted the Minister for Health, Solomone Naivalu. In September 2004 the Auditor-General found that he had abused public funds set aside for emergency overseas medical treatment to fund his own treatment in Australia.

The Fiji Village news service announced on 21 March 2006 that the SDL had decided not to nominate Sauqaqa for another Parliamentary term. He therefore retired at the 2006 election, and was succeeded by Ratu Meli Saukuru.

In May 2006 he was alleged to have accepted bribes from young women seeking places at the Fiji School of Nursing. He was arrested on related charges in April 2008.
