= Party of National Unity (Fiji) =

Political party in Fiji

The Party of National Unity (better known by its acronym of PANU) was a Fijian political party founded by Ratu Sairusi Nagagavoka in 1998; by the time of the military coup of 2006, Nagagavoka remained the President of the party. A well-known member of the party was Apisai Tora. Presenting itself as a multiracial party representing the interests of Ba Province in particular, it formed part of the Fiji Labour Party-led People's Coalition in the general election of 1999, and won four seats in the House of Representatives. It lost all of its seats in the following election, in 2001, but party stalwart Ponipate Lesavua was appointed to the Senate as one of 8 nominees of Opposition Leader Mahendra Chaudhry.

== Merger with BKV ==
PANU's chief rival for support in Ba Province was the Protector of Fiji, better known locally as Bai Kai Viti (BKV), with which it merged in 2004 to form the People's National Party (PNP). Following the completion of the merger, PANU and the BKV were both formally deregistered on 23 August 2005.

=== Reregistration of PANU ===
Not all PANU supporters were happy about the party's dissolution, however, or about the decision of the merged party to participate in the Grand Coalition Initiative Group, an electoral coalition of ethnic Fijian parties seeking to present a united front for the forthcoming election, scheduled for August or September 2006. On 25 November 2005, Lesavua announced that in response to public demand, he and a number of others were spearheading attempts to revive the party and reregister it. The necessary documents would be filed with the Elections Office within a week, Lesavua said. "The party is being revived because of the great demand from people at the grassroot level for PANU to contest the 2006 general election, he stated.

The Fiji Times reported on 11 January 2006 that Lesavua had made the necessary arrangements the previous week to reregister the party. The failed merger with the BKV had been on the basis of a promise not to enter into any racially exclusive or biased coalition. The breach of this promise was a dangerous trend amongst the majority of Fiji's political parties, Lesavua said.

Lesavua condemned the overwhelming dominance of indigenous Fijians in the present Cabinet. "Most of those in cabinet are either Fijian or Rotuman even though our country is a multi-racial country," he complained. He said that PANU would promote the principles of justice, love, unity, and fairness, to ensure that all citizens were successful, regardless of their race, religion, or creed.

In another twist to the ongoing saga of PANU-BKV relations, Lesavua announced on 23 January 2006 that the BKV, like PANU, had seceded from the PNP and had signed an agreement to merge with PANU, in order to present a united front representing western Fiji. Lesavua also told Fiji Village that the party would be sharing preferences with the Fiji Labour Party and the National Alliance Party.

=== New merger with PNP ===
Fiji Live revealed on 2 March that the abortive merger of PANU with the PNP had been resurrected. Officials of the PNP and PANU had met over the weekend at the village of Sorokoba, Ba, to formalize a merger of their two parties. "In politics there are no permanent enemies and no permanent friends but we hope they understand and they will be informed of the move," PNP leader Meli Bogileka told Fiji Television. It was announced on 5 March that the BKV has also joined the re-merged party, which will contest the 2006 election under the PANU banner. Recapturing the three seats that it won in 2000 would be a priority, said Ponipate Lesavua.

Reacting to the merger, Jale Baba, campaign coordinator of the Soqosoqo Duavata ni Lewenivanua (SDL), said that it was a sad move. Establishing a party for the purpose of promoting one particular region in Parliament was "provincialism", he said.

== Towards Election 2006 ==
The Fiji Sun quoted Lesavua on 20 January 2006 as saying that PANU wanted to contest all parliamentary seats - Fijian, Indian, and Open - from Ba Province, and was looking for candidates who would represent all races and both genders. Younger candidates were also being sought, he said. Lesavua defended the notion of a provincial party. "Since Ba Province is the power base for the country's economy, there is a need to have a political party for the province's people," he told the Sun. On 27 January, he announced that PANU would give its first "preferences" to the Fiji Labour Party (Fiji's electoral system allows for transferable voting), and would also cooperate with the United Peoples Party and the National Alliance Party.

=== Election result ===
The party won at the Fiji election of 2006 1% and no seats. In July 2006, the coalition with Labour ended.

== Post 2006 ==
Following the military coup of 5 December 2006, the Military-backed interim government required all political parties to reregister in preparation for the 2014 elections. Only two existing political parties did so successfully; PANU was not one of them. It was consequently dissolved and its assets forfeited to the state.
