= Grand Coalition for Fiji =

Political coalition in Fiji

The Grand Coalition for Fiji, formerly known as the Grand Coalition Initiative Group, was a coalition of five predominantly indigenous Fijian political parties in Fiji, forged for the purpose of contesting the general election scheduled for 2006 under a single umbrella and forming a coalition government subsequently. Efforts to unite the ethnic Fijian parties were in part a response to their electoral defeat in 1999, when they had been split, enabling the Indian-backed FLP to win a landslide victory. Nevertheless, Tomasi Vakatora, the chairman of the Grand Coalition, publicly stated in February 2006 that it was open to sharing preferences with the predominantly Indian parties. By the time of the election, however, the coalition was virtually defunct.

== Coalition membership ==
The formation of a Grand Coalition Initiative Group (GCIG) was announced on 30 July 2005 by Tomasi Vakatora, a former Cabinet Minister and Speaker of the House of Representatives. The original participating parties were: the Soqosoqo Duavata ni Lewenivanua (SDL) and the Conservative Alliance (CAMV) (these two parties were already in coalition, comprising bulk of the present government), the Soqosoqo ni Vakavulewa ni Taukei (SVT) (which led Fiji's governments from 1992 to 1999), the Nationalist Vanua Tako Lavo Party (NVTL), and the People's National Party (PNP). Coalition membership was later reduced to three parties; the CAMV decided to disband to join the SDL on 17 February 2006, and the PNP withdrew its membership on 7 March, following its decision to merge with the Party of National Unity (PANU) and oppose the coalition in the upcoming parliamentary election.

SVT General Secretary Ema Druavesi said on 23 January 2006 that the membership of the coalition was still open to any party willing to join. Vakatora, for his part, clarified on 15 February that membership was not limited to indigenous Fijian parties; if parties led by Indo-Fijians expressed interest in joining, they would be welcomed - provided that they signed the coalition's code of conduct.

== Establishment of the coalition ==
The announcement was the culmination of months of negotiations mediated by Vakatora. The five parties agreed to exchange preferences in Fiji's transferable voting system, which had allowed smaller parties to swing key seats in close elections after preferential voting was introduced in 1997. The parties would then form a coalition government if its members won a majority of the 71 seats in the House of Representatives. Vakota stated, "The parties believe that contesting the election together is the best way forward. It will ensure a stable and workable government that will represent a wide cross-section of the community."

Political polarization along racial rather than ideological lines had characterized Fijian politics since responsible government was granted towards the end of colonial rule in the 1960s, but Vakatora denied that the purpose of the coalition was to maintain ethnic Fijian control, saying: "It is about political stability, with predominantly Fijian parties making a start, without whom stability in Fiji will be difficult to achieve." He insisted that the coalition was not closed, but that other parties and individuals were welcome to join. SDL general secretary Jale Baba concurred, saying that his party had non-indigenous members, including Indo-Fijians, and that joining an ethnic Fijian coalition was not a denial of multiracialism.

The establishment of the coalition was welcomed by SDL leader and Prime Minister Laisenia Qarase, who said he supported any move to unite Fijians. He added on 2 August that racial politics was a fact of life, and that it was essential for indigenous Fijian parties to unity because the splintering of the indigenous vote had hurt them in the past. He would, however, reach out to Indo-Fijian led parties also, he said.

The Presidents and officials of all participating parties met again in the Suva suburb of Nabua on 13 August, and signed a Memorandum of Agreement, confirming that the coalition was a reality. The agreement affirmed the independence of each of the participating parties, whilst aiming to ensure that all indigenous Fijian votes are shared amongst all indigenous parties. Vakatora said that the municipal elections due in October 2005 would be a trial-run for the parliamentary election of 2006.

== Criticisms ==
Not all members of all participating parties were completely happy with the coalition. Ema Druavesi, general secretary of the SVT, denied that her party had signed the Memorandum of Agreement establishing the coalition, saying that a party meeting on 13 August would finalize a decision. The Conservative Alliance also appeared to be divided at the top level. It transpired on 3 August that the party president, Ratu Tanoa Cakobau (also known as Ratu Tanoa Visawaqa), had attended the coalition gathering and signed the agreement without informing his colleagues, incurring the ire of the party's now defunct general secretary, Ropate Sivo, who said that the president was not authorized by the party's constitution to negotiate on behalf of the party without informing its members. But his protest was to prove futile when the executives voted Sivo out for insubordination within the party ranks. The Fiji Village news service reported the next day, as a meeting to discuss the dispute was getting underway, that Sivo had told Cakobau that he had done nothing for the party and could "walk out" any time he chose. The CAMV President maintained, however, that the party's six-member parliamentary caucus and the executives were behind him, and the Fijivillage news service reported on 9 August that plans were underway to remove Sivo from his position. Cakobau expected Sivo's predecessor, Ratu Josefa Dimuri, to be reappointed in his place. Sivo, however, countered that he had no intention of resigning and said that he could be removed only if the party considered him unfit for the position. This was to eventuate soon after.

Other parties criticized the developments. National Alliance Party leader Ratu Epeli Ganilau said that in agreeing to the all-indigenous coalition, the ruling SDL had demonstrated that its purported commitment to multiracialism was meaningless. On 14 August, he went further, declaring that the initiative was nothing more than a jostle to retain power.

Opposition Leader Mahendra Chaudhry said that the grouping of parties on ethnic lines would further divide the nation, and accused Prime Minister Qarase of using fear tactics to scare indigenous Fijians into supporting indigenous parties, lest Indo-Fijians take over the country. National Federation Party General Secretary Pramod Rae predicted that internal differences in the coalition would cause it to be short-lived.

Despite his role in the formation of the coalition, former Prime Minister Sitiveni Rabuka expressed doubts about its workability on 27 December. Public feuding among its members threatened to derail the project, he warned. The recent attack on the 1997 Constitution by Nationalist Vanua Tako Lavo Party leader Iliesa Duvuloco had upset him, he said.

The coalition was criticized on 17 February 2006 by Ratu Epeli Ganilau, President of the National Alliance Party (NAPF), who accused Coalition spokesman Tomasi Vakatora of being "blatantly racial" for saying that indigenous Fijians could not be treated equally with other races. Ganilau called for an investigation into whether Vakatora had breached the Constitution or any other laws. Ganilau argued that the very existence of an ethnic coalition was questionable, stating: "For the Prime Minister and Mr Vakatora to be openly advertising the grouping of Fijian political parties is again an action which threatens harmonious racial relations because it encourages polarisation of racial groups and tension amongst them."

== Internal difficulties ==
Vakatora was quoted by the Fiji Sun on 20 February that the coalition's aim of uniting all indigenous-led parties was hampered by the differences in their manifestos. The decision of the Conservative Alliance to disband and merge with the SDL in mid-February was a positive step, but for other parties to do likewise would be problematic, he thought.

NVTLP President Viliame Savu opposed the SDL-CAMV merger, and said he had doubts about the coalition.

PNP General Secretary Meli Bogileka said on 3 March 2006 that his party was reconsidering its membership in the coalition. The matter would be decided the following day at a meeting of PNP and PANU officials, he said. On 7 March, he said that a letter was being sent to the Coalition to inform it of the PNP's decision to withdraw.

== The 2006 election ==
The Grand Coalition renamed the Grand Coalition for Fiji, was launched publicly on 10 March 2006. University of the South Pacific (USP) Vice-Chancellor Anthony Tarr was invited as a guest speaker at the launch event, a move criticized by the opposition Fiji Labour Party (FLP). FLP President Jokapeci Koroi told Fiji Times on 7 March that it was out of order for an academic to be seen to be taking sides in an election. If anything, the head of a regional university should be siding with politicians who stood for "enlightened and liberal policies". Koroi stated, "Those of us who are continually fighting a battle to make Fiji truly multi-racial find it offensive that an expatriate holding such a responsible office in our country, should be participating in a move that clearly espouses racial segregation." Tarr defended his decision to attend the launch, saying that there was no truth to the insinuation that he endorsed racism.

SVT General Secretary Ema Druavesi was quoted in Fiji Village on 10 March as saying that the coalition was uniting indigenous Fijians for the purpose of being able to work with others, and that the group needed an outsider to show them the way forward.

The coalition largely disintegrated before the election. The withdrawal of the PNP and the disbanding of the CAMV reduced its membership to three parties; of these, the SVT contested only one constituency out of 71, and the NVTLP a few more. During the campaign, the coalition was barely mentioned, if at all. When the results were tallied, the SDL had won 36 seats and its coalition partners none.

The controversy over Anthony Tarr's decision to participate as a speaker at the Grand Coalition for Fiji launch was later identified as a contributing factor to his resignation as vice chancellor at USP.
