= Electoral system of Fiji =

== Historical overview ==
Fiji's electoral system is the result of complex negotiations, compromises, and experiments conducted over the years leading up to and following independence from British colonial rule in 1970. A number of devices have been tried at various times to accommodate the reality that the primary faultline in Fijian politics is not ideological, but ethnic. The competing political interests of the indigenous Fijians and Indo-Fijians defined the political landscape for a generation. There are also small communities of Europeans, Chinese, and other minorities.

In colonial times, the British authorities established a legislative council with mostly advisory powers, which were gradually extended. European males were enfranchised in 1904 an allocated 7 elective seats in the Legislative Council. Fijians were represented by 2 chiefs chosen by the colonial Governor from a list of 6 nominees submitted by the Great Council of Chiefs. There was initially no representation for Indian immigrants or their descendants, but in 1917 they were granted one seat, filled by a nominee of the Governor.

This seat was made elective in 1984, when wealthy Indian males were enfranchised. By 1954, Europeans, Indo-Fijians, and indigenous Fijians were allocated an equal number of seats on the Legislative Council. The mode of election remained different: universal male suffrage for Europeans and an enfranchised wealthy elite for Indians; indigenous Fijians continued to be represented by nominees of the Great Council of Chiefs, and did not vote directly for their own representatives until the general election of 1966, the last election to be held before independence.

From the early 1960s onwards, the Indo-Fijian dominated National Federation Party began campaigning for universal franchise on a common voters' roll. Leaders of the indigenous Fijian community objected to this proposal, fearful that it would grant effective political control to Indo-Fijians, who then comprised a majority of the country's population. A number of compromises were agreed to in the years that followed.

== Former House of Representatives ==
Fiji used the first past the post system for most of its history, but the new constitution in 1997–1998 agreed to replace it with the alternative vote (AV) system, allowing votes to be transferred from a low-polling candidate to other candidates, according to an order prescribed by the candidate, which may be customised by the elector.

AV allows voters to rank candidates in the order of their preference, with votes for low-polling candidates transferred to higher-polling candidates. Candidates who receive a minimum of 50 percent of the total vote in their respective constituencies are declared elected. If no candidate receives 50 percent, votes cast for low-polling candidates are transferred to higher-polling candidates, beginning by eliminating the lowest-polling candidate and continuing until one candidate has 50 percent or more of the vote.

The variant of AV chosen was taken from the Australian electoral system used for the Australian Senate where voters can opt to vote "above the line", accepting a party's prespecified preference order. This system allows parties to pre-specify electoral alliances and is akin to the use of apparentment, linked party lists, in party-list proportional representation systems. Voters who disagree with the way their preferred candidate has arranged to transfer his or her votes if eliminated may opt to vote "below the line" of the ballot paper instead. Here, electors may rank all candidates in the order of their preference.

=== Criticisms ===
Since its implementation, the voting system has proved controversial, with some politicians claiming that it allows political parties to fix election results by making electoral pacts for the transfer of votes. Some have alleged, for example, that many indigenous Fijians cast votes for the Christian Democratic Alliance (VLV) or the Party of National Unity (PANU) in the 1999 election, unaware that those parties had signed agreements with the Indo-Fijian-dominated Fiji Labour Party to transfer votes from low-polling VLV and PANU candidates to the FLP, thereby allowing the FLP to win more seats.

Conversely, many Indo-Fijian supporters of the National Federation Party (NFP) in the 2001 poll may not have been aware that votes for NFP candidates, all of whom lost, were to be transferred to the indigenous-dominated Soqosoqo Duavata ni Lewenivanua (SDL). Prime Minister Laisenia Qarase of the SDL has admitted that his party won a number of seats on NFP preferences, as transferred votes are known.

Vice-President Ratu Joni Madraiwiwi expressed his own misgivings about the voting system on 3 November 2005. He said it made the work of political parties much easier and denied freedom of choice to voters, as a vote for a political party was ultimately a vote for any other party to which that party had decided to transfer its preferences. "In hindsight, it would perhaps have been preferable to leave the voter to make up his own mind," Madraiwiwi said.

He reiterated these reservations on 9 February 2006, and proposed proportional representation as an alternative. His call went unheeded by both the Grand Coalition Initiative Group (a coalition of indigenous Fijian parties) and by the predominantly Indo-Fijian Fiji Labour Party, both of which said they were satisfied with the present system.

Prime Minister Laisenia Qarase added his own voice to the dissent on 21 December 2005, saying that the system might be too complicated for the average voter to understand. A high percentage of the votes cast in 1999 and 2001 had been declared invalid, he said, and he feared that the same would be true in 2006. He called for consultations on a possible return to first past the post.

== Constituencies ==
Members of the Fijian House of Representatives were elected from single-member constituencies. Several kinds of constituencies have existed at various times, and at the time of dissolution there were two: communal and open constituencies.

=== Communal constituencies ===
Communal constituencies were the most durable feature of the Fijian electoral system. Before 1966, all elective seats in the Legislative Council were allocated by ethnicity and elected by voters enrolled as members of specific population groups. It avoided direct competition for power along racial lines.

Critics pointed out that apportionment was not proportional: even after 1966, ethnic Fijians and Indo-Fijians, who outnumbered them, were both allocated 9 elective seats, and European and other minorities, who comprised less than ten percent of the population, were allocated 7. Minority representation was reduced from 1972 onwards (3 out of 27 communal constituencies); indigenous Fijians and Indo-Fijians continued to be represented equally (12 seats each).

The 1990 Constitution of Fiji abolished all non-communal constituencies. The general election of 1992, and a subsequent election in 1995, saw all members of the House of Representatives elected on a strict communal basis.

A constitutional revision in 1997–1998 reduced communal representation to 46 seats out of 71. 23 seats were allocated to ethnic Fijians, 19 to Indo-Fijians, 1 to Rotuman Islanders, and 3 to minority groups.

=== National constituencies ===
As a compromise between competing demands for universal suffrage (advocated by most Indo-Fijian leaders) and a strict communal franchise (supported by most indigenous Fijian chiefs), 9 "cross-voting" constituencies, later renamed national constituencies, were established for the first time for the 1966 election. The 9 seats were allocated ethnically (with ethnic Fijians, Indo-Fijians, and minorities allocated 3 seats each), but elected by universal adult suffrage. This compromise required candidates to seek support from outside of their own ethnic group, without having to deal with competition from candidates of other races.

An agreement in 1970 led to the expansion of the number of national constituencies to 25 from 1972 onwards. This was almost half of the 52-member House of Representatives. Indigenous Fijians and Indo-Fijians were allocated 10 national seats each, with minorities taking the remaining 5.

Following two military coups in 1987, the national constituencies were abolished under pressure from Fijian ethno-nationalists, who opposed allowing non-indigenous electors to vote for indigenous Fijian representatives.

=== Open constituencies ===
A constitutional revision in 1997–1998 allowed direct electoral competition between candidates of different ethnic groups for the first time. 25 Open constituencies were established, with candidates of all races competing for votes cast on a common voters' roll. In the parliamentary election of 1999, the open constituencies proved to be much more competitive than the communal constituencies, in which ethnic loyalty to particular political parties generally guaranteed predictable results. This trend was even more apparent in the election of 2001.

=== Chiefly nominees ===
Before 1966, all Fijian representatives in the Legislative Council were nominated by the Great Council of Chiefs. The chiefs continued to nominate two members to the Legislative Council after 1966, but chiefly representation was abolished in the first post-independence election of 1972. They were compensated, however, with the creation of a Senate, in which 8 out of 22 Senators were nominated by the chiefs. This figure was increased to 24 out of 34 in 1992, but reduced to 14 out of 32 in 1999.

=== Official members ===
From 1904 to 1966, a majority in the Legislative Council were appointed by the colonial Governor. Seats held by these nominees, known as official members, were abolished that year.

== Proposal for "one man, one vote" ==
Then-interim leader Commodore Frank Bainimarama, who overthrew the government of Prime Minister Laisenia Qarase in a military coup in December 2006, has blamed Fiji's "communal voting" system for ethnic tensions and a lack of a strong feeling of shared national identity and citizenship. Bainimarama stated that he would favour abolishing the communal voting system, in favour of a "one man, one vote" "common roll" system with no ethnic distinctions between voters.

Originally opposed to the idea, Qarase later voiced tentative support. Qarase said he supported the idea in principle, but added: "[W]e are a very young democracy and I think if we move now to one man, one vote system it will be far too fast and far too early." Instead, Qarase suggested a new system of proportional representation, in which each ethnic community would be represented in Parliament in proportion to its numbers within the population. This would confer a majority in Parliament to indigenous Fijians.

In July 2009, Bainimarama announced that a new Constitution would be introduced by his government by 2013. It would amend the electoral system, abolishing communal voting. A new constitution was promulgated in September 2013, abolishing both Communal and Open constituencies, and instituting a form of proportional representation, with the whole nation voting as a single constituency for a 50-member unicameral Parliament, which replaced the previous bicameral Parliament.

== Parliament of Fiji ==
The 51 members of Parliament were elected from a single nationwide constituency by open list proportional representation with an electoral threshold of 5%. Seats are allocated using the d'Hondt method.

== See also ==
- Elections in Fiji
