= 2001 Fijian general election =

← 1999	August–September 2001	2006 →

All 71 seats in the House of Representatives 36 seats needed for a majority
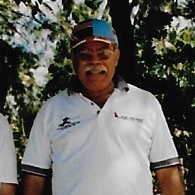

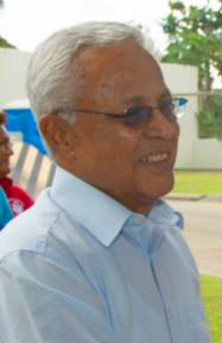

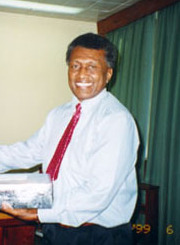

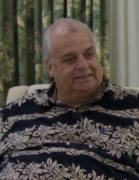
	First party	Second party	Third party
			CAMV
Leader	Laisenia Qarase	Mahendra Chaudhry	Rakuita Vakalalabure
Party	SDL	Labour	CAMV
Last election	–	37 seats	–
Seats won	32	27	6
Seat change	New	▼10	New
	Fourth party	Fifth party	Sixth party
		NFP
Leader	Tupeni Baba	Attar Singh	Mick Beddoes
Party	NLUP	NFP	UGP
Last election	—	0 seats	2 seats
Seats won	2	1	1
Seat change	New	▲1	▼1
Prime Minister of Fiji before election
Mahendra Chaudhry
Labour
Elected Prime Minister of Fiji
Laisenia Qarase
SDL

General elections were held in Fiji in August and September 2001. The Soqosoqo Duavata ni Lewenivanua party won 18 of the 23 seats reserved for ethnic Fijians and one of three "general electorates" set aside for Fiji's European, Chinese, and other minorities. It also won 13 of the 25 "open electorates," so-called because they are open to candidates of any race and are elected by universal suffrage. The remaining five ethnic Fijian seats, and one open electorate, were won by the Conservative Alliance, one of whom was George Speight who had led the putsch against the lawful government the year before. Chaudhry's Labour Party won all 19 Indo-Fijian seats and eight open electorates. The New Labour Unity Party, formed by defectors from the FLP, won one general electorate and one open electorate. The three remaining seats (one general electorate, one open electorate, and the Rotuman Islanders' seat) were won by minor parties and independent candidates.

== Background ==
The Constitution of Fiji was restored by a High Court decision on 15 November 2000, following the failure of the political upheaval in which the government had been deposed and the constitution suspended in May that year. On 1 March 2001, the Appeal Court upheld the decision. An election to restore democracy was held in September 2001. In what was one of Fiji's most bitterly fought elections ever, the newly formed Soqosoqo Duavata ni Lewenivanua of the interim Prime Minister Laisenia Qarase narrowly defeated the Fiji Labour Party of deposed former Prime Minister Mahendra Chaudhry.

The FLP had been hurt by leadership bickering in the wake of the coup, and the subsequent defection of a number of its high-profile members from the ethnic Fijian community, including Tupeni Baba, the former Deputy Prime Minister. The mutual refusal of the FLP and the National Federation Party, the only other political party with significant Indo-Fijian support, to reach a preference-swapping deal had also worked against both parties. (In Fiji's system of transferable voting, any two or more candidates in a particular constituency can have their votes combined, unless the electors specify a different option by ranking the candidates numerically in order of their preference).

== Opinion polls ==
=== Approval ratings ===
Pollster(s)	Date	Sample size	Chaudhry		Qarase	
Pollster(s)	Date	Sample size	Satisfied	Dissatisfied	Satisfied	Dissatisfied
The Fiji Times	May 2000		54%	—	—	—

== Results ==
Party	Open constituencies			Communal constituencies			Total seats
Party	Votes	%	Seats	Votes	%	Seats	Total seats
Fiji Labour Party	113,981	35.20	8	112,316	34.46	19	27
Soqosoqo Duavata ni Lewenivanua	83,095	25.66	13	86,132	26.42	19	32
National Federation Party	32,658	10.09	1	32,959	10.11	0	1
Conservative Alliance-Matanitu Vanua	30,313	9.36	1	34,101	10.46	5	6
Soqosoqo ni Vakavulewa ni Taukei	20,560	6.35	0	14,523	4.46	0	0
New Labour Unity Party	17,230	5.32	1	11,735	3.60	1	2
Bei Kai Viti	6,250	1.93	0	7,828	2.40	0	0
Fijian Association Party	4,430	1.37	0	3,850	1.18	0	0
Party of National Unity	1,937	0.60	0	4,481	1.37	0	0
Nationalist Vanua Tako Lavo Party	1,493	0.46	0	2,393	0.73	0	0
Dodonu ni Taukei	843	0.26	0	188	0.06	0	0
Justice and Freedom Party	176	0.05	0	326	0.10	0	0
Party of the Truth	35	0.01	0	220	0.07	0	0
United General Party				3,260	1.00	1	1
General Voters Party				1,904	0.58	0	0
Lio 'On Famör Rotuma Party				1,803	0.55	0	0
Christian Democratic Alliance				337	0.10	0	0
Girmit Heritage Party				50	0.02	0	0
Independents	10,818	3.34	1	7,548	2.32	1	2
Total	323,819	100.00	25	325,954	100.00	46	71
Valid votes	323,819	88.09		325,954	88.13		
Invalid/blank votes	43,773	11.91		43,917	11.87		
Total votes	367,592	100.00		369,871	100.00		
Registered voters/turnout	470,807	78.08		468,691	78.92		
Source: Elections Office, Elections Office, Psephos

=== Communal constituency results ===
==== Fijian constituencies ====
Party	Votes	%	Seats
Soqosoqo Duavata ni Lewenivanua	83,506	50.09	18
Conservative Alliance-Matanitu Vanua	33,776	20.26	5
Soqosoqo ni Vakavulewa ni Taukei	14,271	8.56	0
Bei Kai Viti	7,828	4.70	0
New Labour Unity Party	7,011	4.21	0
Party of National Unity	4,481	2.69	0
Fiji Labour Party	3,857	2.31	0
Fijian Association Party	3,528	2.12	0
Nationalist Vanua Tako Lavo Party	2,393	1.44	0
National Federation Party	817	0.49	0
Christian Democratic Alliance	337	0.20	0
Party of the Truth	220	0.13	0
Dodonu ni Taukei	188	0.11	0
Independents	4,504	2.70	0
Total	166,717	100.00	23
Valid votes	166,717	89.10	
Invalid/blank votes	20,394	10.90	
Total votes	187,111	100.00	
Registered voters/turnout	239,124	78.25	
Source: Psephos

==== Indo-Fijian constituencies ====
Party	Votes	%	Seats
Fiji Labour Party	108,459	74.58	19
National Federation Party	32,142	22.10	0
New Labour Unity Party	3,731	2.57	0
Justice and Freedom Party	326	0.22	0
Soqosoqo Duavata ni Lewenivanua	149	0.10	0
Girmit Heritage Party	50	0.03	0
Fijian Association Party	8	0.01	0
Independents	565	0.39	0
Total	145,430	100.00	19
Valid votes	145,430	86.81	
Invalid/blank votes	22,097	13.19	
Total votes	167,527	100.00	
Registered voters/turnout	209,046	80.14	
Source: Psephos

==== General constituencies ====
Party	Votes	%	Seats
United General Party	3,260	32.45	1
Soqosoqo Duavata ni Lewenivanua	2,477	24.66	1
General Voters Party	1,904	18.95	0
New Labour Unity Party	993	9.89	1
Conservative Alliance-Matanitu Vanua	325	3.24	0
Fijian Association Party	314	3.13	0
Soqosoqo ni Vakavulewa ni Taukei	252	2.51	0
Independents	520	5.18	0
Total	10,045	100.00	3
Valid votes	10,045	91.50	
Invalid/blank votes	933	8.50	
Total votes	10,978	100.00	
Registered voters/turnout	14,950	73.43	
Source: Psephos

==== Rotuman constituency ====
Candidate	Party	Votes	%
Marieta Rigamoto	Independent	1,959	52.07
Riamkau Tiu Livino	Lio 'On Famör Rotuma Party	1,803	47.93
Total		3,762	100.00
Valid votes		3,762	88.41
Invalid/blank votes		493	11.59
Total votes		4,255	100.00
Registered voters/turnout		5,571	76.38
Source: Psephos

=== Seats changing hands ===
This does not include seats that changed candidates but not parties, defections or seats held by members not seeking re-election.

Seat	Pre-election			Post-election		
Seat	Party	Member	Percentage	Percentage	Member	Party
Ba East (Fijian)	PANU	Ponipate Lesavua	52.55	21.28	Epeli Seavula	SDL
Ba West (Fijian)	PANU	Meli Bogileka	65.53	60.12	Tomasi Sauqaqa	SDL
Bua (Fijian)	VLV	Mitieli Bulanauca	54.74	61.08	Josateki Vula	CAMV
Cakaudrove East (Fijian)	SVT	Inoke Kubuabola	78.66	56.09	Naiqama Lalabalavu	CAMV
Cakaudrove West (Fijian)	SVT	Kinijoji Maivalili	68.94	21.28	Rakuita Vakalalabure	CAMV
Cunningham (Open)	Labour	Joeli Kalou	60.14	56.19	Solomone Naivalu	SDL
Kadavu (Fijian)	SVT	James Ah Koy	83.95	54.65	Komodo Yabaki	SDL
Nadroga (Open)	Labour	Mosese Volavola	55.22	54.15	Jonetani Galuinadi	SDL
Nadroga Navosa (Fijian)	FAP	Leone Tusiowaqa	50.65	53.22	Pita Nacuva	SDL
Naitasiri (Fijian)	FAP	Peceli Rinakama	71.21	75.61	Ilaita Tuisese	SDL
Nasinu Rewa (Open)	Labour	John Ali	50.68	51.11	Peniasi Silatolu	SDL
Nasinu Urban (Fijian)	FAP	Joji Uluinakauvadra	50.43	65.73	Emasi Qovu	SDL
Nausori Naitasiri (Open)	Labour	Lavenia Padarath	50.04	56.92	Asaeli Masilaca	SDL
North Eastern (General)	GVP	Leo Barry Smith	52.59	60.41	David Christopher	SDL
North West Urban (Fijian)	PANU	Akanisi Koroitamana	67.23	68.40	Joji Banuve	SDL
Ra (Fijian)	PANU	Eloni Goneyali	52.98	51.23	Tomasi Viletilovoni	SDL
Samabula Tamavua (Open)	Labour	Tupeni Baba	58.37	56.36	Manoa Dobui	SDL

== Aftermath ==
Controversy continued after the 2001 election, with Prime Minister Qarase finding reasons, which many considered to be pretexts, for not implementing the power-sharing provisions of the Constitution, which required that every political party with more than 8 seats in the House of Representatives must be proportionally represented in the Cabinet. On 18 July 2003, the Supreme Court of Fiji ruled that Qarase's exclusion of the Labour Party from the Cabinet was unconstitutional, and demanded that the situation be rectified. Appeals, counter-appeals, and negotiations delayed the implementation of the order. In June 2004, the Supreme Court ruled that the Labour Party was entitled to 14 out of 30 Cabinet posts. Qarase has said that he would abide by the ruling, but his refusal to include Chaudhry in the Cabinet lineup continued to stall negotiations, until the FLP announced in November that it was no longer interested in participating in the Qarase-led government.
