= Social Liberal Multicultural Party =

Political party in Fiji

The Social Liberal Multicultural Party was a minor political party in Fiji. The party's leader was Joketani Delai. It unsuccessfully contested the 2006 election, winning only 49 votes.

In January 2013 the military regime promulgated new regulations governing the registration of political parties, requiring all parties to have at least 5,000 members. All existing parties had to re-register under the new regulations. The party was not one of the two to re-register, and as a result was wound up and its assets forfeited to the state.
