= Tomasi Kanailagi =

Tomasi Kanailagi (1938 or 1939 — 14 June 2018) was a Fijian Methodist minister and political leader. He served as president of the Methodist Church of Fiji and Rotuma from 1999 to 2001, and in the Senate of Fiji from 2001 to 2006.

Rev Kanailagi only reached class four in Qamea where he was bought up. He went to reside in Koro where his uncle was a post master. From Koro he went to the theological college in Davuilevu.

Following the 1987 Fijian coups d'état, he supported Rabuka, and was later part of a group of senior Methodists who ousted the church president for opposing the coup. He later supported the 2000 Fijian coup d'état.

In 2001 he was nominated to the senate by Prime Minister Laisenia Qarase. In August 2002, Kanailagi told the senate that non-indigenous Fijians should leave the country. He also accused the Fiji Times of being an agent of evil which was plotting against Christianity. In 2003 he opposed the Family Law Bill, which removed discrimination against women from many Fijian laws, claiming that it would undermine the traditional fabric of society. He lost his senate seat in the 2006 Fijian coup d'état. He was subsequently appointed chairperson of the Fiji Council of Churches.

Following the 2006 Fijian coup d'état, the military regime told the Methodist church that it would not be permitted to hold any more annual conferences until Kanailagi was removed from office. When the church attempted to hold its 2009 conference, he was arrested for violating the Public Emergency Regulations. He was subsequently charged with organising an unlawful meeting. The charges were eventually dropped in December 2016.

In 2010 he opposed the military regime's decree legalising homosexuality.
