= National Alliance Party of Fiji =

Former political party in Fiji

The National Alliance Party of Fiji (NAPF) was a Fijian political party. It was formally registered on 18 January 2005 by Ratu Epeli Ganilau, as the claimed successor to the defunct Alliance Party, which ruled Fiji from 1967 to 1987 under the leadership of the late Ratu Sir Kamisese Mara, Ganilau's father-in-law. Others involved with the party included university lecturer Meli Waqa as party secretary, and Manu Korovulavula as treasurer. The Deputy Leader was Hirdesh Sharma. The party was launched publicly at a mass rally in Suva on 8 April 2005.

The party announced its intention to wind up in February 2013.

== Background ==
Previous attempts to forge a multi-racial political movement, including the electoral pact between the ethnic Fijian Soqosoqo ni Vakavulewa ni Taukei (better known in Fiji by its Fijian name, Soqosoqo ni Vakavulewa ni Taukei) and the predominantly Indo-Fijian National Federation Party, which contested the 1999 election unsuccessfully, had been well-meant but ill-timed, Ganilau said. He declared that the racially based politics which followed the 1987 and 2000 coups, which sought to establish ethnic Fijian supremacy, were now widely understood to have been detrimental to the country, and that the time was now right for a multiracial political party. "The old Alliance Party represented the multi-racial communities of the country, which is what we have in common," Ganilau said. "We found a multi-racial party is the most successful and the most stable in the leadership of the country."

Ganilau expressed optimism that the new party would allow him to convey his vision of a multiracial Fiji more effectively than he had been able in his previous role as Chairman of the Great Council of Chiefs. "I was quite outspoken about the need to respect the rights all citizens in Fiji during my role as chairman of the Great Council of Chiefs," he said, "but that did not go down well with some. That is why I decided it was best to continue the fight on a political platform."

The NAPF absorbed the Fiji Democratic Party, which officially dissolved itself. The former Democrat leader, Filipe Bole, assumed a prominent role as a spokesman for the new party. Other former politicians from the Mara era endorsed the party, including Bill Aull, Fereti Dewa, Joji Uluinakauvadra, and Irene Jai Narayan.

Not all contemporary politicians, however, were so positive. In a strongly worded reaction on 12 April 2005, Prime Minister Laisenia Qarase attacked the new party, claiming that it would split the ethnic Fijian vote, which he said would not be good for the country. He also accused it of promoting policies that he said were the main cause of instability in the past - namely support for the 1997 constitution and the Agricultural Landlords and Tenants Act, both of which Qarase had attempted, without success, to substantially amend.

On 4 May 2005, spokesman Bole said that party membership, and participation in party meetings, were increasing. Party president Ratu Ganilau said that finance was a major challenge for the party, but donors had come forward and the party was exploring creative ways to raise extra revenue. He was also encouraged by the considerable numbers of people who were volunteering to stand as candidates in the election expected to be held in 2006.

Ganilau said on 1 February 2006 that the party would reorient the Affirmative Action policy away from race, to focus rather on need. "Whilst we don’t disagree with the Affirmative Action Policy, we rather place emphasis on the need rather than a particular group," he said. The policy would be aimed at guaranteeing access to education, employment, land, housing, and community participation to all citizens, regardless of race.

== Policies ==
At the public launch of the party in April, Ganilau declared uniting the people of Fiji to be the most urgent priority. "We are here today, not so much as to launch a political party but more so and more importantly we are here today to project a vision that will inspire hope," Ganilau said. He condemned the promotion of communal interests and policies which, he said, denied the nation's advancement.

In addition to promoting interethnic cooperation and national unity, the party would strongly emphasize economic development, Ganilau said. He called for greater government investment in shipbuilding, as well as in agriculture, tourism, and the clothing industry.

The party took a strong stand against the government's controversial Reconciliation, Tolerance, and Unity Bill. If passed, the bill would set up a Commission empowered to compensate victims and pardon perpetrators of the 2000 coup. Opponents said that the bill was just a legal mechanism for releasing supporters of the government who had been imprisoned on coup-related charges.

== Towards 2006 ==
Spokesman Filipe Bole announced on 7 August 2005 that if the NAP won the general election scheduled for 2006, primary and secondary education would be made free and compulsory. Parents keeping their children away from school to do errands would be prosecuted, he warned. Textbooks and stationery would also be free, Bole said. The Fiji School Leaving Certificate and the Fiji Seventh Form Examination would be retained, he said, but all other national exams would be abolished, as too many were failing to pass the Fiji Secondary Entrance examination. The Fiji Junior Certificate was similarly of no use, he considered; in the past, it had been used as a qualification to enter some professions such as nursing, teaching, and the police, but it had outlived its usefulness.

On 1 September, Ganilau said he wanted candidates for all 71 seats in the House of Representatives to be chosen by the end of 2005. He rejected criticism from former Prime Minister Sitiveni Rabuka and Fijian Political Party Secretary Ema Druavesi; they and others had said that previous efforts to forge a multiracial electoral alliance had been a failure, and that Ganilau's own political history, including his former leadership of the now-defunct Christian Democratic Alliance, did not give grounds for optimism.

Bhagwat Maharaj, President of the Party's Western Division, said on 18 February 2006 that the party intended to contest all seats in the Western Division. A party statement also said that women would be allocated 50 percent of the candidates.

=== Coalition ideas ===
On 30 August 2005, Ganilau declared that his party would not be rushed into making any coalition agreements for the general election scheduled for 2006. He said that the party had held informal talks with the Fiji Labour Party (FLP) and the National Federation Party (NFP), but that the talks were of an exploratory nature and intended to keep channels of communication with other parties open. The possibility of a coalition had not been raised because it was still too early, Ganilau said. On 18 September, however, he said that the National Alliance Party would indeed attempt to negotiate an electoral pact with the FLP and the NFP, as well as with the United Peoples Party. "It is very important to combine forces to combat the 2006 General Elections to have a better Government," Ganilau said. Under Fiji's instant run-off voting system, known locally as the Alternative Ballot, votes for low-polling candidates are transferred to higher-polling candidates, according to a preference ranking specified by the candidates or parties (though voters may customize the ranking).

The Alliance was not interested in joining the Grand Coalition Initiative Group, he said on 30 August, because as a multi-racial party, it would not join a coalition that was not committed to multiracial politics. The Grand Coalition is a grouping of five indigenous Fijian-dominated parties, including the ruling Soqosoqo Duavata ni Lewenivanua (SDL), formed in August 2005, with a view to perpetuating indigenous predominance in the political sphere.

On 29 November, Ganilau said that the party would talk to all other parties, including the ruling (SDL), before making a final decision on any electoral pact. In the meantime, they would keep their options open, he said. He reiterated on 30 January 2006 that the party was continuing to keep its coalition options open.

The Fiji Times revealed on 18 February 2006 that the NAPF would be entering into coalition talks with the Fiji Labour Party the following week. The Fiji Sun reported the following day that a "merger" of the two parties was being considered. It was not immediately clear whether that meant a merger in the normally understood sense of the two parties becoming one, or rather that a formal coalition agreement would be brokered; the Fijian media had, on occasion, referred to coalition deals as "mergers." On 23 February, however, Ganilau told a rally in Cautata Village in Tailevu Province that the party had decided, at least for the time being, to contest the election on its own. Maintaining its independence now would boost its bargaining power with other parties later, Fiji Village quoted him as saying.

Ganilau announced on 27 February, however, that he would be holding discussions with Chaudhry that week. Leadership of any coalition formed would be an issue, he said; many indigenous Fijians were wary about Chaudhry's leadership. He clarified, however, that this was the fault of unscrupulous politicians who had sown distrust of non-indigenous leaders like Chaudhry.

On 13 March, Ganilau and FLP Parliamentarian Krishna Datt both denied reports that their respective parties had agreed on Cabinet allocations in a coalition government. A secret agreement had allegedly provided for Ganilau to become Prime Minister, Chaudhry Minister for Finance, and FLP Deputy Leader Poseci Bune Foreign Minister. Discussions were ongoing, they said, and no agreement had been made.

=== Election manifesto ===
Ganilau said on 30 August 2005 that in preparing the party manifesto, party officials had been looking at 25 areas of development. They had settled on 16 areas grouped into five major categories, to which they intended to make major changes.

The party held its first convention on 16 December 2005, at which it released the outline of its manifesto for the 2006 election, becoming the first political party to do so. The manifesto prioritized rural development, education, and employment. Guest speaker Anthony Tarr, Vice Chancellor of the University of the South Pacific, presented ideas about creating employment opportunities and economic development.

Ratu Epeli Ganilau spoke of the "urgent need" to break down the racial polarization, which he said could be achieved only "by providing an open and fair government, expanding the economy and attracting investment to fully develop our natural resources." He spoke out against land laws that hold natively owned land in reserve, saying that impoverishes the indigenous landowners and contributes to Fiji's growing squatter problem. Ganilau also said that coalition talks with other parties were still at an informal stage, and that no firm agreements had been made.

=== Election result ===
Shortly before the election, the NAPF announced on 7 April 2006 that the Indo-Fijian Justice and Freedom Party had decided to merge with the NAPF, and that some JFP members would contest the election under the NAPF banner. "I urge that all Indian leaders should support the National Alliance leadership so that Indians can get back their lost right and enjoy a safe and secure future," said a statement signed by JFP General Secretary Dildar Shah.

Despite widespread publicity and high-profile candidates, the election held on 6–13 May was a disappointment. The NAPF attracted a mere 3 percent of the popular vote, and won no constituencies.

== Dissolution ==
In January 2013, the Fijian regime announced new political party registration rules which would make it difficult for parties to contest elections. In response, Ganilau announced that the party would not seek re-registration.
