= Freedom Alliance (Fiji) =

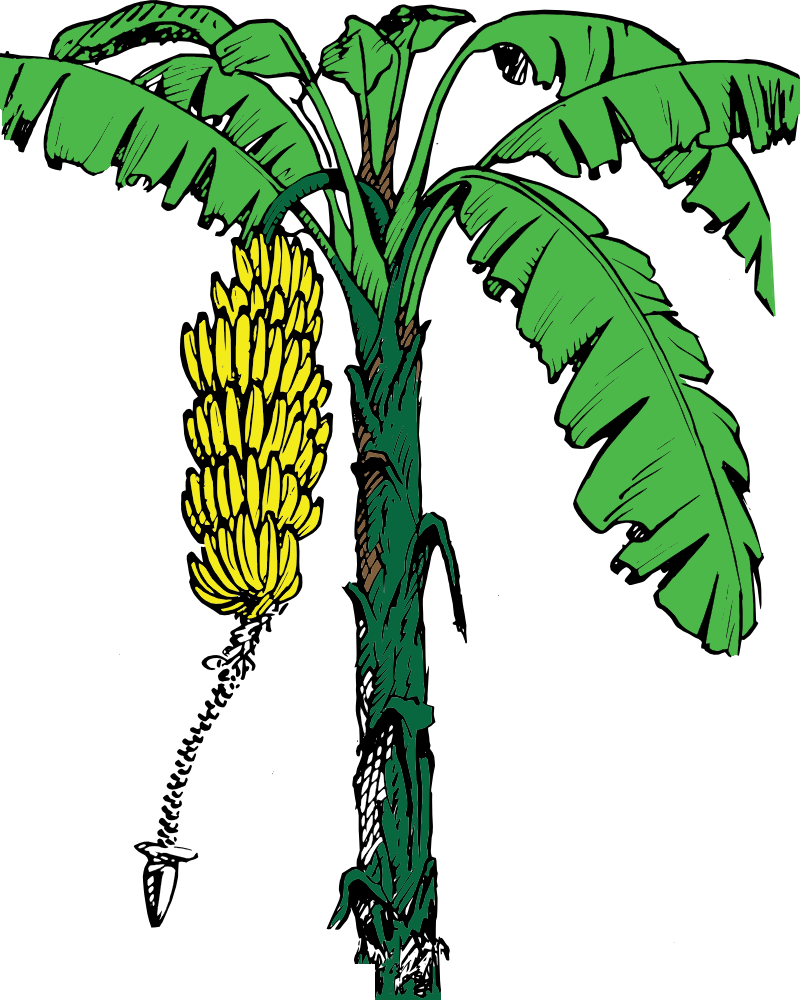
- Abbreviation: FAP
- Leader: Jagath Karunaratne
- Founded: May 2014
- Registered: 1 August, 2014
- Dissolved: 2 September, 2022
- Preceded by: Fiji United Freedom Party
- Ideology: Social liberalism Subsidiarity; Internationalism
- Colours: Green and yellow
- MPs in the Parliament of Fiji: 0 / 51

Election symbol
- Banana tree

The Freedom Alliance (FAP), formerly the Freedom Alliance Party and Fiji United Freedom Party (FUFP), is a currently deregistered political party in Fiji. The party's interim president is Jagath Karunaratne. The party aims to provide a platform for youth.

The party applied for registration in May 2014 but the application was rejected due to insufficient valid signatures. The party lodged a second application for registration in July, and this was accepted on August 1, 2014.

It contested the general election held in September 2014, but did not win any seats.

In June 2018 the party changed its name to the "Freedom Alliance" following the conviction of its leader for sedition. In October 2018 it signed a partnership agreement with the Fiji Labour Party to join forces for the 2018 election. The party submitted a joint list of 25 candidates, including 6 women. However the joint list failed to win any seats, winning only 2,800 votes.
