= Meli Bogileka =

Fijian politician

Minister for Communications and Civil Aviation
- In office 1999–2000
- Prime Minister: Mahendra Chaudhry

Member of the Fijian Parliament for Ba West Communal
- In office 15 May 1999 – 1 September 2001
- Preceded by: None (constituency established)
- Succeeded by: Tomasi Sauqaqa

Personal details
- Party: Party of National Unity; Bei Kai Viti; Fiji Labour Party

Ratu Meli Bogileka is a Fijian politician. He was the Secretary of the People's National Party (PNP) up to its decision to merge into the Party of National Unity (PANU) on 5 March 2006. This merger, an affair complicated by several about-turns, saw Bogileka appointed Secretary of the new PANU. (Bogileka had originally helped to forge the PNP as a union of a former PANU and another party, the Protector of Fiji (BKV); both parties were reregistered in January 2006, seceding from the PNP; the PNP and the BKV subsequently merged into PANU in March).

Bogileka was educated at St John's College in Cawaci.

First elected as a candidate of the original PANU to represent the Ba West Fijian communal constituency in the House of Representatives in the parliamentary election of 1999, Bogileka subsequently served in the Cabinet of Prime Minister Mahendra Chaudhry from 1999 to 2000, and was held as a hostage by gunmen led by George Speight, who led a coup d'état against the Chaudhry government, starting on 19 May 2000. Political realignments that followed the 2000 crisis saw him lose his seat in the election held to restore democracy in 2001.

Bogileka also stirred controversy by criticizing the legacy of modern Fiji's first statesman, Ratu Sir Lala Sukuna, who is regarded as a national hero. On 23 May 2005, he said that Sukuna's achievements had been overstated, and that his policies had confined Fijians to villages and marginalized them economically. He considered that Sukuna should have used his chiefly position to urge indigenous Fijians to work rather than remain in their villages in the name of culture. His comments provoked an angry reaction from the government, which issued a press release calling his statement "inaccurate" and saying that it should be "treated with the contempt it deserves."

Bogileka has also served General Secretary of the Viti and Resource Landowners Association, which advocates the return to indigenous ownership of all "crown land" – i.e., government-owned land. This was not a political demand, he told the Fiji Sun on 3 January 2006, but rather an insistence on the fulfillment of a promise made by Queen Victoria in 1881, at Nailaga in Ba Province. He strongly disagreed with Military Commander Commodore Frank Bainimarama for saying that the association should not "waste time" trying to recover ownership of the Queen Elizabeth Barracks in Delainabua, Suva.

It was announced on 12 March 2006 that Bogileka would contest his old Ba West constituency in the parliamentary election scheduled for 6–13 May. He was unsuccessful.

Following the 2006 Fijian coup d'état Bogileka became a supporter of the military regime, and urged the removal of democrats from the regime's pre-election political forum. In 2009 he was suspended from the Nasinu Town Council for unspecified reasons.

He contested the 2014 election as a Labour candidate, but was unsuccessful.
