= 2006 Fijian general election =

- 15 May 2006

All 71 seats in the House of Representatives 36 seats needed for a majority
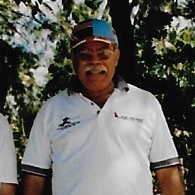

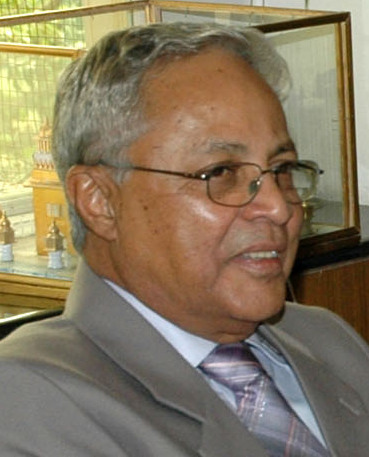

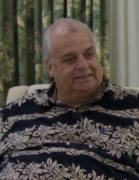
	First party	Second party	Third party
Leader	Laisenia Qarase	Mahendra Chaudhry	Mick Beddoes
Party	SDL	Labour	UPP
Last election	34 seats	27 seats	1 seat
Seats won	36	31	2
Seat change	▲2	▲4	▲1
Prime Minister before election
Laisenia Qarase
SDL
Subsequent Prime Minister
Laisenia Qarase
SDL

General elections were held in Fiji between 6 and 13 May 2006.

The incumbent Soqosoqo Duavata ni Lewenivanua government, led by Prime Minister Laisenia Qarase, was re-elected for a third term in government, opposed by the Labour Party, led by Mahendra Chaudhry, as well as several other minor parties. However, Qarase was later removed from office following a coup d'état.

== Background ==
The 1997 Constitution of Fiji required general elections for the House of Representatives to be held at least once every five years. Acting President Ratu Joni Madraiwiwi issued a proclamation on 2 March 2006, effective from 27 March, dissolving Parliament. The previous parliamentary term had been due to expire on 1 October 2006.

The Writ of Elections was issued on 28 March; candidates filed their nominations on 11 April and published their preference lists on the 13th, while voter registration closed on 4 April.

=== Electoral boundary adjustments ===
A major issue to be resolved ahead of the election was that of constituency boundaries. With the constitution requiring the 25 open constituencies and 29 of the 46 communal constituencies to be substantially equal in population, the Constituency Boundaries Commission, chaired by Barrie Sweetman, explored possible changes. Time constraints made the matter an urgent one, he said on 21 November. The elections office also revealed that any changes to electoral boundaries would require a reregistration of all voters affected, further complicating the exercise. A final decision was expected by the end of November 2005, but this was delayed.

Sweetman announced on 6 February 2006 that with the elections so close, boundaries might not be changed at all. Unless there was pressure from political parties, the commission would meet in the next week to decide the matter, he said.

The Commission ruled on 24 February that there would be no changes to electoral boundaries, citing lack of time before the forthcoming elections. Changes could be made only following a census, the last of which was held in 1996; current population data was too old, Sweetman said. The commission called for a review of census laws, suggesting an interval of five years rather than the current ten.

== Election characterised by ethnic politics ==
Elections in Fiji at the time were characterised by two fundamental realities.

- Firstly, for the past generation, the basic faultline of Fijian politics is not ideological, but ethnic, with most political parties appealing mainly to a single ethnic group, although many parties would say that is not their intention. This election proved to be no exception, with over 80 percent of the popular vote and all 23 seats reserved for indigenous Fijians going to the SDL, and a similar percentage and all 19 seats reserved for Indo-Fijians going to the FLP.
- Secondly, the electoral system is based on transferable voting. Known locally as the "Alternative Vote," this system incorporates elements of both instant run-off voting and group voting ticket. Votes cast for low-polling candidates are transferred to higher-polling candidates according to a ranking of "preferences" specified by the candidates, though voters who so wish may customize the preferences. This makes it necessary, in many cases, for political parties to seek alliances to win constituencies.

Depending on ideological, demographic, and electoral factors, parties may seek to consolidate their position in communal constituencies (reserved by ethnicity) by forging alliances with other parties appealing to the same ethnic group, or improve their position in open constituencies (elected by universal suffrage) by entering into alliances with parties that appeal to different ethnic groups. There are 46 communal constituencies (23 reserved for indigenous Fijians, 19 for Indo-Fijians, 1 for Rotuman Islanders, and 3 for minorities such as Caucasians, Chinese, and Banaban Islanders), and 25 open constituencies.

=== Coalition politics ===
A record of 25 parties had registered for the 2006 election, as of early March. Most of the major parties led by indigenous Fijians have formed a coalition, tentatively known as the Grand Coalition Initiative Group, in an attempt to consolidate the indigenous vote; the coalition appears certain to be dominated by the Soqosoqo Duavata ni Lewenivanua (SDL), which the nucleus of the present ruling coalition of Prime Minister Laisenia Qarase. (A smaller party, the Conservative Alliance (CAMV) was part of the ruling coalition and of the Grand Coalition, but was dissolved and merged into the SDL in early March).

On the other hand, intense rivalry between the Fiji Labour Party (FLP) of former Prime Minister Mahendra Chaudhry and the National Federation Party, the two main parties with significant Indo-Fijian support, appears to make any alliance between them problematic. Both have expressed interest in forming a multi-racial alliance with the National Alliance Party (NAPF) of Ratu Epeli Ganilau (an avowedly multiracial party) and the United Peoples Party (UPP) of Mick Beddoes, which appeals mostly to minority groups. On 16 October, the UPP announced that negotiations to form an electoral pact with the FLP had been concluded, and the decision to go ahead had been endorsed by the UPP executive the day before. On 2 December, the two parties signed a memorandum of understanding, agreeing to draw up a joint manifesto and to exchange preferences, but leaving both parties free to contest any or all of the 71 seats separately, or to field joint candidates by mutual agreement. The memorandum also left open the possibility of other parties joining the coalition.

SDL Executive Director Jale Baba had earlier said that the deal between the FLP and the UPP had been expected, and that the SDL did not see it as a threat. He also said that it was possible that the SDL might form partnerships with parties not involved with the Grand Coalition.

Consultations have also taken place between both parties and the NAPF, with Ganilau announcing on 17 October that a decision on whether or not to forge an electoral pact with the FLP and UPP would be announced after a meeting of party executives. On 29 November, however, he said that the NAPF wanted to keep its options open and would hold negotiations with all political parties, including the SDL, before reaching a final decision.

The Party of National Unity (PANU), which was re-registered in January 2006 following its dissolution a few months earlier, announced on 27 January that it would be giving its first preference to the FLP, and would also cooperate with the NAPF and the UPP. PANU, a multi-racial party based in Ba Province, had previously aligned itself with the FLP-dominated People's Coalition in the 1999 election.

=== Crossing the faultline ===
The two major political parties, the SDL and the FLP, are both attempting to break out of their ethnic cocoons. The SDL, which presently has only one Indo-Fijian in its Parliamentary caucus and attracted less than one percent of the Indo-Fijian vote in 2001, has announced that it will contest all 19 communal constituencies reserved for Indo-Fijians, with General Secretary Jale Baba saying that the party is "confident" of winning most of them. The FLP, for its part, is hoping to win some of the 23 communal seats reserved for indigenous Fijians for the first time. Although founded in the mid-1980s by Timoci Bavadra, an indigenous Fijian, it lost most of its indigenous support in the 1990s and attracted barely two percent of the indigenous vote in 2001, which saw only two indigenous candidates elected on the FLP ticket, neither from a Fijian communal constituency.

Both parties have expressed optimism about their gambits, with Prime Minister Qarase saying on Radio Sargam (affiliated to Fiji Village) on 5 October that the SDL expected to win an absolute majority in the 71-member House of Representatives, and regarded as many as 50 seats as a real possibility.

== Calls for restraint in rhetoric ==
Police Commissioner Andrew Hughes spoke out on 30 September to call on politicians to avoid using hate speech in the run-up to the election. He said the police would prosecute anyone who appealed for votes on the basis of hate or fear.

United Peoples Party leader Mick Beddoes similarly called on party leaders to exert better control over members making public statements, while Soqosoqo Duavata ni Lewenivanua General Secretary Jale Baba said that the making of hate speeches by any member of the party would never be tolerated.

On 26 November 2005, Electoral Commission Chairman Graeme Leung proposed a Code of Conduct prohibiting political parties from using inflammatory language, and from appealing to racial, religious, regional, or gender divisions. False and defamatory allegations would be banned, as would calls inciting violence or hatred. Disruption of meetings and political rallies would also be proscribed. Leung called on all political parties to adopt the code of conduct and said that ideally, it should be enshrined in legislation. Many politicians welcomed the proposed code, with FLP Deputy Leader Poseci Bune calling it long overdue. Mick Beddoes supported it also, but cautioned that it would work only if persons breaching it were disciplined for doing do. Cabinet Minister Simione Kaitani, while endorsing the proposal in general, said the prohibition against appealing to racial divisions was "unrealistic," as politics was based to such a great extent on race. National Alliance Party President Ratu Epeli Ganilau also welcomed the code of conduct and called for legislation to effect it, but said it would be hard to enforce it.

Calls for restrained language have not always been heeded. Closer to the election, the main political leaders traded accusations of "terrorism." Prime Minister Qarase called Opposition Leader Mahendra Chaudhry a "terrorist" on 15 February 2006, for allegedly using his travels abroad to discredit the government and discourage investment. According to the Fiji Sun, he was responding to claims made by Chaudhry at the FLP campaign launch in Ba Town on the 11th that the government itself was full of terrorists, but said that he would not be suing Chaudhry because he did not want to "waste time" on him. Chaudhry then reacted by saying that the Qarase government was full of terrorists. "There are people in his Government, ministers, who have been convicted of offences relating to the May 2000 coup," he said. He claimed that Qarase had won the 2001 elections by vote-buying and by hiding from the voters the role that many of his candidates had allegedly played in the 2000 coup.

Also on the 15th, Fiji Television quoted the Prime Minister as saying that Chaudhry was "unstable" and unfit to lead the country.

Speaking to Fiji Live on 16 February, the Prime Minister challenged Chaudhry to produce the evidence for his allegations that there are terrorists serving in the government; if such proof existed, he should refer it to the police. He reiterated that he did not want to waste time pursuing the matter legally.

Prime Minister Laisenia Qarase announced on 2006-03-01 that the 2006 general elections would be held in the second week of May from the 6th to the 13th. (Radio New Zealand)

== Demographic changes ==
Fiji Television reported on 26 January 2006 that electoral registration of Indo-Fijians was down by more than twelve percent on 2001 figures, reflecting the high rate of emigration from that community. Although guaranteed 19 communal constituencies, the latest statistics would make it more difficult for Indo-Fijian-dominated parties to win many of the 25 open constituencies, which are elected by universal suffrage, the report said.

Vice-President Ratu Joni Madraiwiwi expressed concern about this trend on 8 February, saying that it would lead to electoral disparity, and Robbie Robertson, Professor and Director of Development Studies at the University of the South Pacific, said that the Indo-Fijian share of the electorate this year would be only 40 percent of the total voting population, an all-time low.

Military spokesman Captain Neumi Leweni said on 19 February that the election should be postponed until a national census could be conducted. He reiterated earlier concerns about redrawing electoral boundaries when no census had been conducted, saying that compromised the fairness of the election. Constituency Boundaries Commission Chairman Barry Sweetman, however, said that the Military should have raised the matter while the committee was taking submissions. There has been no census since 1996; the one due in 2006 has been postponed till 2007 because of the elections.

== Contesting parties ==
By 13 March 2006, a total of 24 parties had registered to contest the election. This list included some newcomers, as well as some parties that had been deregistered and subsequently reregistered. These included the Coalition of Independent Nationals (COIN), which applied for reregistration on 13 March.

== Campaign ==
Controversy erupted early in March 2006, with the ruling SDL being criticised by some for distributing funds, through the Duavata Initiative Trust, to needy people, allegedly in an attempt to buy votes. Campaign coordinator Jale Baba told Fiji Live that the charity was not bribery and that the party had, in fact, been raising money for the poor since 2002. On 8 March, Director of Public Prosecutions Josaia Naigulevu and Commissioner of Police Andrew Hughes confirmed to the Fiji Times that the Fiji Labour Party (FLP) had lodged a complaint about the scheme, and that police were looking into it.

Prime Minister Qarase was reported by Fiji Television on 6 March 2006 as saying that the economy had performed well under his government's stewardship, and that citizens could expect further strong economic growth and increased wages if his government was returned to office.

On 7 March, University of the South Pacific (USP) Vice-Chancellor Anthony Tarr found himself fending off criticism from Fiji Labour Party (FLP) President Jokapeci Koroi for accepting an invitation to address the public launch of the Grand Coalition Initiative Group on 10 March. He rejected Koroi's claims that it was inappropriate for him to be seen to be siding with a coalition promoting racial politics and that if he had thought there were any such connotations to the invitation, he would not have accepted it.

== Opinion polls ==
=== Approval ratings ===
Pollster(s)	Date	Sample size	Qarase		Chaudhry	
Pollster(s)	Date	Sample size	Satisfied	Dissatisfied	Satisfied	Dissatisfied
The Fiji Times	June 2006		76%	—N/a	—N/a	—N/a
The Fiji Times	4 December 2006		54%	—N/a	—N/a	—N/a

== Interested organisations ==
In addition to the political parties contesting the election, a number of organisations have expressed an intense interest in its conduct and outcome.

=== The Military in the background ===
The outspoken Military Commander, Commodore Frank Bainimarama initially opposed the early election date, saying that the registration and enrolment process was not complete and that no election should be held without a census preceding it. He conceded, however, that it was too late to hold a census now; it should have been held two years ago, he said. On another issue, his spokesman Lieutenant Colonel Orisi Rabukawaqa said that the Military was still opposed to the controversial Reconciliation, Tolerance, and Unity Bill, and warned the government against trying to reintroduce it should it win the elections.

SDL campaign coordinator spoke out on 3 March to condemn Bainimarama's stated intention to discourage soldiers and their relatives and friends from voting for political parties and candidates that he termed "racist" and "discriminatory." He challenged Bainimarama to contest the election himself if he wanted to participate in politics. "If the good commander is passionate and is a man of integrity, he should resign and contest the next elections. That is the proper and legal form for leaders with a vision to articulate their vision for or against them," Baba told Fiji Television. Australian Foreign Minister Alexander Downer also criticised the Commander. In an interview with ABC Television reported by Fiji Live on 3 March, Downer reiterated earlier opposition to Military interference in politics.

Bainimarama said on 9 March that the Military would support any government that was elected, but would not necessarily support its program. He condemned claims that a vote for the FLP would be a vote for instability, saying that such "lies" came from the same "opportunists" who had attempted the 2000 coup. He urged Fijian citizens to vote for candidates on the basis of their policies, rather than their ethnicities. "Don't choose a party just because it's a Fijian party. Choose an Indian or Chinese if his policies are for your benefit," Fiji Live quoted him as saying.

=== Justice and Truth Campaign ===
On 10 March, the Fiji Village news service quoted Bainimarama as saying that the Military was about to launch a campaign to inform the population about how certain SDL policies allegedly contravened the Constitution. "My senior officers and I agreed in a meeting last week that the army should inform the people of Fiji of what happened in 2000," he said. "We will use the media, we will go into villages and tell them the real truth of what happened and what is being done. There is no strong leadership in the Government to say 'do the right thing'. By not having programmes to educate people that what happened in 2000 was wrong, we will continue to live in an area of instability like that of 2000," he declared. He accused the government of deliberately misleading the population: "By not educating the people about doing what is right, it is willfully lying and misleading them," he alleged. Ropate Sivo, General Secretary of the Conservative Alliance (who is resisting the decision of the party to dissolve) condemned the Commander's comments, saying that he was "only hungry for power."

Military spokesman Captain Neumi Leweni reacted angrily on 13 March to the dismissal on the 9th of talk show host Sitiveni Raturala from the state-owned Fiji Broadcasting Corporation (FBCL). An interview Raturala had conducted with Bainimarama had breached his contract, FBCL Chief Executive Officer Francis Herman said. Leweni charged that the government had had a hand in the dismissal, and warned against any attempts to muzzle the media in the leadup to the election. Leweni was supported by Ema Druavesi, General Secretary of the Soqosoqo ni Vakavulewa ni Taukei (SVT), which ruled Fiji throughout most of the 1990s.

The same day, another Military spokesman, Lieutenant Colonel Orisi Rabukawaqa, said that the campaign was not anti-government or anti-any particular party. It was all about persuading the electorate to vote on the basis of conscience rather than race, the Fiji Times quoted him as saying.

The Fiji Times quoted Bainimarama on 13 March as saying that the SDL government had betrayed the mandate given to it by the Military in 2000. In appointing the Qarase government, Bainimarama said, the Military had taken it for granted that it would uphold the rule of law. Such expectations had been misplaced, he considered.

SDL campaign organiser Jale Baba said on 13 March that he had written to the Elections Office, the Commissioner of Police, and the Director of Public Prosecutions to call for an investigation into what he called the unconstitutional campaign of the military, and what he alleged to be its illegal use of public money. The next day, the Fiji Sun quoted Baba as saying that legal action against the Military was being considered, and that he had written to the Chairman of the Electoral Commission to call for them to investigate the Military's political activities. The President of Fiji had also been written to and asked to discipline the Commander, he said.

Prime Minister Qarase called a meeting of Fiji's National Security Council on 14 March to discuss the behaviour of the Military. He said that the actions of the Commander were unwarranted and undemocratic. He also raised the issue of illegal spending of public money for the Military's political campaign. Meanwhile, Radio Australia reported that the Auditor General had been asked to investigate this alleged misuse of public funds.

Fiji Village quoted the Prime Minister as saying that the real reason for the breakdown in his fortnightly meetings with Bainimarama was that the latter had expected him to implement orders from the Military and had shown no respect for the elected government. "On my meetings with the military commander, what really went wrong was that he expected me and my Government to follow orders. In other words, to do everything he wanted," Qarase said. He accused Commodore Bainimarama of "conveniently forgetting" that the Fiji Labour Party (FLP), which he accused the Commander of supporting, had itself attempted to form a coalition with the Conservative Alliance (CAMV), which included numbers of coup-sympathizers, some of whom were subsequently convicted of involvement, after the 2001 election, and had offered amnesty to coup-convicts in exchange for CAMV support for an FLP government.

The military campaign was criticised even by other opponents of the government. Rev. Akuila Yabaki of the Citizens Constitutional Forum said on 14 March that while he sympathized with the Military's reasons for opposing government policies, it was unacceptable in a democracy for the Military to intervene in the electoral process and that such interference must be stopped. Fiji Village revealed the same day that Home Affairs Minister Vosanibola had filed another complaint with police about the Commander's public statements against the government.

=== The Methodist Church ===
Reverend Ame Tugaue, General Secretary of the Methodist Church (to which some two-thirds of indigenous Fijians are affiliated) told Fiji Live on 7 March that the church supported the Qarase government and the SDL, but would not attempt to influence its members to vote accordingly. He emphasized, however, that the church supported what he considered to be the strongly Christian moral stance of the SDL, adding, "It is our right and responsibility and we will choose someone who will ensure peace since Fiji was a paradise before."

== Conduct ==
Some politicians alleged that there have been irregularities in the process of the registration of voters in the leadup to the election.

United Peoples Party leader Mick Beddoes alleged in September 2005 that persons of multiracial ancestry were being encouraged by electoral officials to register on the indigenous communal roll, rather than the General Electors' roll. While the Constitution empowers persons of multiple ethnic origins to decide for themselves what roll to choose, Beddoes said that officials were providing prospective voters with registration forms only for the indigenous and Indo-Fijian rolls, not the General Electors' one. He repeated the allegation in March 2006, according to a Fiji Times report on 9 March. General electors and even Indo-Fijians with some distant indigenous ancestry were being asked to register as indigenous voters, on the basis of false claims that doing so would entitle them to membership of the Native Land Register, he alleged. Elections Supervisor Semesa Karavaki rejected Beddoes's allegations, saying that people with any indigenous ancestry were constitutionally entitled to register as such, and at any rate, many of Beddoes's examples were spurious. He said that some that Beddoes had identified as "General Electors" mis-enrolled as indigenous Fijians were, in fact, full-blooded Fijians married to General Electors and using their husbands' names.

Fiji Labour Party (FLP) leader Mahendra Chaudhry alleged that multiple irregularities have arisen in the enrolment of Indo-Fijians. In some areas, he said, none had been able to register, elderly and disabled members of the community had been told they did not need to register; some had been registered for the wrong constituencies, while others had been wrongly recorded with their given names and surnames reversed, rendering the registration invalid. On 6 October, he called for the registration process to be halted and begun again from scratch. He wondered aloud whether the irregularities were a deliberate ploy to reduce the numbers of Indo-Fijians enrolled for the 2006 election. This would not affect the number of communal seats held by Indo-Fijians, which is constitutionally fixed at 19, but could have an effect on the results in the 25 open constituencies elected by universal suffrage.

FLP parliamentarian Vijay Singh threatened on 28 January 2006 that if alleged errors in voter registration were not put right, his party would take legal action to prevent elections from taking place in particular constituencies. The threat of legal action was reiterated by Mahendra Chaudhry on 2 February. Singh alleged that in his own Vuda Open Constituency, numerous voters had been wrongly registered in other constituencies. Registration was down on 2001 figures, but the population of the electorate had increased, he maintained.

SDL Campaign Director Jale Baba alleged on 30 January that the FLP had deliberately urged its supporters to delay registering, in order to manipulate the Boundaries Commission, an assertion rejected as false by FLP Parliamentarian Lekh Ram Vayeshnoi. To the contrary, the FLP had been urging its supporters to register, he said. He complained, however, that registration was being carried out before constituency boundaries had been finalized, which he said was illegal under the Electoral Act.

The Elections Office revealed on 1 February that a total of 1628 duplicate registrations had been detected. No less than 317 of these were of persons aged under 21 and therefore disqualified from voting. The Fiji Labour Party said that the discovery of such irregularities came as no surprise, while United Peoples Party President Mick Beddoes said it called the electoral enrolment process into question, and called for independent organisers to be brought in to ensure that the process was fair.

Electoral Commission Chairman Graeme Leung had announced in late November 2005 that identity cards for voters were being prepared, to discourage voter impersonation. The card will record the voter's name and date of birth. The decision was not universally welcomed. People's National Party leader Meli Bogileka said that the whole purpose of identity cards would be defeated if electors without them were allowed to vote, and considered their introduction a waste of money. SDL executive member Navitalai Naisoro said that Fijian people were not used to identity cards, and that the system would not be readily accepted. Leung agreed that acceptance of the changes would take time.

The FLP and the National Alliance Party (NAPF) both claimed on 27 February 2006 that numerous irregularities persisted, including the registration of voters in wrong constituencies. Labour leader Mahendra Chaudhry said he believed this was deliberate.

Prime Minister Qarase revealed on 2 February 2006 that he would be inviting observers from the United Nations, the Commonwealth of Nations, and possibly other organisations, to monitor the forthcoming elections.

== Results ==
Vote counting began on 15 May, with the results, a narrow victory for the ruling Soqosoqo Duavata ni Lewenivanua (SDL) Party, announced on 18 May.

Party	Open constituencies			Communal constituencies			Total seats
Party	Votes	%	Seats	Votes	%	Seats	Total seats
Soqosoqo Duavata ni Lewenivanua	170,830	44.50	13	171,522	44.80	23	36
Fiji Labour Party	153,503	39.99	12	147,304	38.48	19	31
National Federation Party	23,594	6.15	0	25,206	6.58	0	0
National Alliance Party	13,063	3.40	0	9,441	2.47	0	0
Party of National Unity	2,099	0.55	0	4,127	1.08	0	0
United Peoples Party	1,607	0.42	0	4,867	1.27	2	2
Nationalist Vanua Tako Lavo Party	1,454	0.38	0	2,203	0.58	0	0
Soqosoqo ni Vakavulewa ni Taukei	237	0.06	0				0
National Democratic Party	123	0.03	0				0
Social Liberal Multicultural Party	49	0.01	0				0
Party of the Truth	23	0.01	0	28	0.01	0	0
Coalition of Independent Nationals				20	0.01	0	0
Justice and Freedom Party				18	0.00	0	0
Independents	17,284	4.50	0	18,083	4.72	2	2
Total	383,866	100.00	25	382,819	100.00	46	71
Valid votes	383,866	91.16		382,819	91.05		
Invalid/blank votes	37,242	8.84		37,613	8.95		
Total votes	421,108	100.00		420,432	100.00		
Registered voters/turnout	484,290	86.95		479,673	87.65		
Source: Elections Office

=== Seats changing hands ===
This does not include seats that changed candidates but not parties, defections or seats held by members not seeking re-election.

Seat	Pre-election			Post-election		
Seat	Party	Member	Percentage	Percentage	Member	Party
Bua (Fijian)	CAMV	Josateki Vula	61.08	80.65	Mitieli Bulanauca	SDL
Nadroga (Open)	SDL	Jonetani Galuinadi	54.15	53.05	Mesulame Rakuro	Labour
Nasinu Rewa (Open)	SDL	Peniasi Silatolu	51.11	53.56	Azim Hussein	Labour
North Eastern (General)	SDL	David Christopher	60.41	55.13	Robin Irwin	Independent
Samabula Tamavua (Open)	SDL	Manoa Dobui	56.36	53.93	Monica Raghwan	Labour
Suva Ciy (General)	NLUP	Kenneth Zinck	60.32	52.13	Bernadette Ganilou	Independent
Suva City (Open)	NLUP	Ofa Swann	59.77	50.96	Misaele Weleilakeba	SDL

== Aftermath ==
Following the elections, the President was required to summon the new House of Representatives not later than 12 June.

=== 2007 Commission of Inquiry ===
Following the military coup which ousted Laisenia Qarase's government in December 2006, the "interim government" led by coup leader Frank Bainimarama received unexpected support from the Fiji Human Rights Commission (FHRC) and its chairwoman Dr. Shaista Shameem. The latter agreed with Commodore Bainimarama's expressed views regarding Prime Minister Qarase's allegedly racist and divisive policies. In 2007, the FHRC commissioned an inquiry into the 2006 general election, intended to reveal whether it had truly been "free and fair".

The Commission of Inquiry delivered a report which "identifie[d] deficiencies and anomalies at every stage of the election process". More specifically, the report stated that Indo-Fijian voters were provided with incorrect information regarding the voting process, that they were mis-registered in their constituencies to a far greater extent than other voters, and that, as an ethnic group, they faced specific impediments to voting (such as an absence of voting slips required for Indo-Fijian voters) in key marginal constituencies. There was also evidence of ballot boxes having been tampered with. Dr. David Neilson, a member of the Commission of Inquiry, wrote:

"The registration process was both inadequate and biased and submissions strongly indicate campaigning involved deliberate and explicit vote-buying near polling day by the SDL party in league with the broader state. [...] The evidence does not provide systematic quantitative proof regarding the extent to which bias and vote-rigging altered the election outcome. But it provides a strong prima facie case that the elections clearly fell short of "free and fair"."

This prompted the Labour Party to state that the SDL had "cheated its way into power through electoral fraud and massive vote buying schemes".
