= Open constituencies =

Type of constituency in the Fijian electoral system

Open constituencies represent one of several electoral models employed in the past in the Fijian electoral system. They derived their name from the fact that they were "open": unlike the communal constituencies, the 25 members of the House of Representatives who represented open constituencies were elected by universal suffrage and were open to members of any ethnic group.

Universal suffrage with a common voters' roll was first proposed by the Indo-Fijian-dominated National Federation Party (NFP) in the early 1960s, but was opposed by most leaders of the indigenous Fijian community, who were fearful that a common roll would favour Indo-Fijians, who then comprised a majority of the population. The proposal came up again intermittently throughout the 1970s, but nothing came of it.

Open constituencies came into being when the 1997 constitution was adopted in 1997–1998. The Constitutional Commission chaired by former New Zealand Governor-General Sir Paul Reeves had recommended a total of 45 open and 25 communal constituencies, but the then-ruling Soqosoqo ni Vakavulewa ni Taukei of Prime Minister Sitiveni Rabuka and the opposition NFP saw the communal constituencies allocated to indigenous Fijians and Indo-Fijians respectively as their power base and insisted on virtually reversing the ratio. The final constitutional draft established 46 communal constituencies and 25 open constituencies, which were required to be substantially equal in population.

In the general elections held in 1999, 2001, and 2006, most political competition took place in the open constituencies. As the fundamental faultline in Fijian politics was ethnic rather than ideological, the racially allocated communal constituencies generally followed predictable voting patterns. The ethnically diverse open constituencies, particularly in urban areas, were much more competitive.

The existence and number of the open constituencies was long a bone of contention in Fijian politics. Many Fijian ethno-nationalists favoured their abolition, whereas many Indo-Fijian politicians like former Prime Minister Mahendra Chaudhry, as well as parties claiming to be multiracial, argued that their number should be increased, or even that all parliamentary seats should be open.

A new constitution promulgated by the Military-backed interim government in 2013 abolished both open and communal constituencies, and instituted a form of proportional representation, with the entire country voting as a single electorate.
