= Soqosoqo ni Vakavulewa ni Taukei =

Political party of Fiji

The Soqosoqo ni Vakavulewa ni Taukei (SVT), occasionally known in English as Fijian Political Party, was a party which dominated the politics of Fiji in the 1990s and was the mainstay of coalition governments from 1992 to 1999.

== Origins ==
The party was founded in 1990 as the political vehicle of the Great Council of Chiefs (GCC), with the declared goal of uniting all indigenous Fijians. A new constitution promulgated in 1990, following two military coups in 1987, abolished the "national" parliamentary seats elected by universal suffrage (which had comprised almost half the House of Representatives); all members henceforth were to be elected by enrolled voters on "communal" electoral rolls that were limited to specific ethnic communities, each of which had an allocated number of seats in the House (37 indigenous Fijians, 27 Indo-Fijians, 1 Rotuman and 5 General Electors (Europeans, Chinese, Banaban Islanders and other minorities)). The end to multiracial voting resulted in a trend towards intracommunal politics, and multiracial parties like the old Alliance Party of longtime Prime Minister Ratu Sir Kamisese Mara were therefore dissolved and replaced by parties representing principally a single ethnic group.

Ratu Mara had announced his intention not to contest the election that was to be held in 1992, but his wife, Ro Lady Lala Mara, an Adi in her own right as the Roko Tui Dreketi, or Paramount Chief, of Burebasaga (one of three hierarchies to which all Fijian chiefs belong in the House of Chiefs), seemed a natural choice to lead a new party as the successor to his. In addition to the GCC, the powerful Methodist Church also endorsed the party.

Major General Sitiveni Rabuka, who had led the 1987 coups, joined the new party also, along with his supporters, and he soon outmaneuvered Ro Lala for the leadership; and her family subsequently distanced themselves from the party. The SVT won the 1992 Fijian general election, but the subsequent defection of six parliamentarians left it without a workable majority. Internal strife weakened the party, and many influential members of the Great Council of Chiefs grew disillusioned with it, as did the Methodist Church. Despite this, it won a plurality in the parliamentary election that was called three years early in 1994, after the 1993 national budget defeat in parliament.

== In government ==
The Vanua of Ra Province went against the GCC-supported SVT party during the 1992 elections and the SVT lost both allocated seats from the Ra constituency during the 1992 Fijian general election. The SVT then traditionally approached the four main traditional chiefs from Ra and endorsed Dr Ratu Wilisoni Tuiketei Malani, the Turaga Gonesau from Nakorotubu, to be the party's sole candidate in the Ra Province constituency during the Fiji election of 1994. At the age of 74, Dr Ratu Malani became the oldest member to be elected to the House of Representatives of Fiji in the 1994 election, with Ratu Mesake Nacola, as an independent candidate, winning the second seat.

Allegations of corruption eroded the popularity of the SVT-led government, which was heavily defeated in the 1999 Fijian general election by the People's Coalition, with the SVT taking just 8 of the 71 seats in the House of Representatives. Rabuka quit as leader of the party, and was followed by several short-lived leaders.

== In opposition ==
Following the 2000 Fijian coup d'état, Taufa Vakatale resigned as president of the SVT and former Foreign Minister Filipe Bole assumed leadership of the party. It contested the election held to restore democracy in 2001 on a platform of supporting the 1997 constitution with amendments, free public transport for school children, an increase in government spending to alleviate poverty, and promotion of community initiatives to end domestic violence. It also called for a return to first past the post voting. These policies failed to stem the tide; the SVT's share of the vote sank to just 5.5 percent and it failed to win any seats. Much of the support it had previously enjoyed went to the new Soqosoqo Duavata ni Lewenivanua of Laisenia Qarase.

== Post-2001 developments ==
In June 2002, many members of the party merged with a number of other parties to form the Fiji Democratic Party, under Bole's leadership. This party dissolved itself in April 2005 to join the new National Alliance Party of Fiji, under the leadership of Ratu Epeli Ganilau.

A rump of the SVT resisted the merger and continued to exist under the presidency of Rabuka. In May 2005, divisions appeared in the leadership of the party over the government's controversial proposal to establish a Reconciliation and Unity Commission with the power to recommend amnesty to perpetrators of the 2000 coup and compensation to its victims. Rabuka endorsed the proposal, as did executive member Militoni Leweniqila, but Ema Druavesi, General Secretary of the SVT, spoke out against it, calling it a political ploy to retain the support of the Conservative Alliance-Matanitu Vanua (CAMV), on whose six parliamentary votes the government depended for its majority. She also expressed concern that the bill interfered with the judicial system. Leweniqila, however, said that not only was the proposal nothing new, it was in fact one that Rabuka, on behalf of the SVT, had proposed as long ago as 2002. He added, however, that acknowledging the government of deposed Prime Minister Mahendra Chaudhry as the lawful government of the land would be the right place to start.

== Coup allegations ==
Towards the end of 2005, the SVT found itself fending off allegations relating to the 2000 coup. In interviews with the Fiji Sun, a daily newspaper, Josaia Waqabaca and Maciu Navakasuasua (who served a three-year prison term for coup-related offences) implicated some senior members of the SVT in the planning of the coup. Druavesi strongly denied that the party had been involved in any way whatsoever, and that if any SVT officials had participated in the plot, they must have done so as individuals, not as representatives of the party. She called on the police to interrogate those identified by Waqabaca and Navakasuasua, however, to determine the truth of the allegations.

== Towards 2006 election ==
On 26 June 2005, Druavesi made a stinging attack on the ruling Soqosoqo Duavata ni Lewenivanua (SDL), accusing it of racism, corruption, and incompetence. Policies enacted supposedly for the benefit of indigenous Fijians had benefited only a few people with family or business ties to government leaders, she said. "Top posts and lucrative contracts were awarded to people who support the party," she alleged. Druavesi said she believed that the Fijian people, disappointed by the SDL-CAMV coalition, would return to the SVT in the 2006 election.

Druavesi's attacks notwithstanding, Rabuka pursued negotiations with the SDL, and on 25 November Prime Minister Qarase confirmed that his own party would definitely be working with the SVT in the forthcoming election. He expected that one expression of cooperation between the SDL and the SVT, as members of the Grand Coalition, would be to exchange electoral preferences between themselves before going outside the group. Under Fiji's voting system, votes cast for low-polling candidates may be transferred to higher-polling candidates as agreed prior to the election.

Druavesi said on 23 February 2006 that the door was open for former members of the CAMV, which had been dissolved on 18 February, to join the SVT. Not all CAMV members had supported the merger of their party with the SDL, she told the Fiji Village news service. She also revealed that the party had received more than a hundred written applications from persons willing to contest the 2006 election for the SVT.

The Fiji Sun reported on 2 March that party officials had met the previous weekend and had decided to continue working as part of the Grand Coalition. The party would not disband or merge with another party, and would retain its identity, Druavesi said. This was because the party was an original one, not a breakaway from another party.

=== Election result ===
The party won no seats at the Fiji election of 2006.

== Post 2006 ==
Like many other political parties, the SVT was disbanded some time after the military coup of 2006.

== Electoral history ==
=== Parliamentary elections ===
Election	Party leader	Votes	%	Seats	+/–	Position	Government
1992	Sitiveni Rabuka	154,656	43.6%	30 / 70	▲30	▲1st	Government
1994	Sitiveni Rabuka	145,091	40.9%	32 / 70	▲2	1st	Government
1999	Taufa Vakatale	143,177	19.9%	8 / 71	▼24	▼2nd	Opposition
2001	Filipe Bole		5.5%	0 / 50	▼8		Extra-parliamentary
2006	Filipe Bole	238	0.03%	0 / 50	Steady		Extra-parliamentary
