= Soqosoqo Duavata ni Lewenivanua =

United Fiji Party Soqosoqo Duavata ni Lewenivanua
- President: Ratu Kalokalo Loki
- General Secretary: Jale Baba
- Founder: Laisenia Qarase
- Founded: 2001
- Dissolved: January 2013
- Succeeded by: Social Democratic Liberal Party
- Indo-Fijian wing: SDL Indian Wing
- Ideology: Conservatism; Fijian nationalism
- Political position: Centre-right to right-wing

The United Fiji Party (Fijian: Soqosoqo Duavata ni Lewenivanua, pronounced [soŋ.ɡo.soŋ.ɡo ndu.a.βa.ta ni le.ɰe.ni.βa.nu.a], SDL) was a political party in Fiji. It was founded in 2001 by Prime Minister Laisenia Qarase as a power base; it absorbed most of the Christian Democratic Alliance and other conservative groups, and its endorsement by the Great Council of Chiefs (Bose Levu Vakaturaga) caused it to be widely seen as the successor to the Alliance Party, the former ruling party that had dominated Fijian politics from the 1960s to the 1980s. It drew its support mainly from indigenous Fijiians.

The party was led in Parliament by Prime Minister Qarase. The party organization was headed up by Ratu Kalokalo Loki as president and by Jale Baba as General Secretary (later termed National Director) until early 2006, when he was transferred at the beginning of 2006 to managing the campaign for the 2006 General Election. Peceli Kinivuwai took over as National Director.

== History ==
From the time of its inception, the SDL stood for the economic and social advancement of all Fiji citizens. There was a strong focus however on reducing the economic gap between the different ethnic communities, which continued to be a controversial issue for many commentators who accused the SDL of blatant racism. It also called for a consolidation of the rule of law and claims to support an independent judiciary.

The SDL contested 59 of the 71 parliamentary seats in the 2001 elections; this figure included only 7 of the 19 seats reserved for Indo-Fijians. It received 26 percent of the vote, well short of the 32 percent polled by the Fiji Labour Party, but helped by preference deals with other ethnic Fijian-dominated parties as well as the Indo-Fijian-led National Federation Party, it became the largest party in Parliament, with 32 out of 71 seats. It subsequently formed a coalition with the Conservative Alliance.

After the 2006 Military Coup, SDL retained its Party Headquarters Office at 66 Mcgregor Rd, Suva. The Party Leadership structure remained intact amidst the political situation, Laisenia Qarase continued to be the Party Leader, Solomoni Naivalu - President, Ro Dona Takalaiyale - Vice President, Ro Teimumu Kepa - Patron. Peceli Kinivuawai remained National Director until he left for Australia and got a Protection Visa where Samisoni Tikoinasau took over until he also had to leave for Australia on a Protection Visa.

Mataiasi Ragiagia took over as Party General Secretary, assisted by the senior executives who were responsible for the administrative and daily organisational affairs of the party.

=== Controversial legislation ===
At its annual conference on 27 May 2005, the SDL strongly endorsed Prime Minister Qarase's controversial proposals to establish a Reconciliation and Unity Commission with powers, subject to presidential approval, to compensate victims and pardon perpetrators of the coup d'état that deposed the elected government in 2000. It agreed, however, to listen to objections. At the same conference, Qarase publicly welcomed what he claimed was an increase in the number of Indo-Fijians joining the SDL, evidence, he said, that the SDL was the multiracial party it had always claimed to be.

=== 2005 municipal election ===
The SDL contested many of the mayoral and council positions throughout Fiji in the municipal elections scheduled for 22 October 2005. In many towns, the SDL was aligned with the National Federation Party (NFP), but in Suva, the two parties feuded over what the NFP claimed was a breach of a memorandum of understanding between the two parties after the previous municipal elections, held in 2002. According to the NFP, the agreement specified that each party would hold the Mayoralty of Suva for one year, with the two parties jointly choosing the Lord Mayor in the third year. The NFP accuses the SDL of having broken the agreement by forging a coalition in 2004 with the Fiji Labour Party to retain the Mayoralty. SDL Secretary Jale Baba denied on 19 October 2005 that his party had breached the agreement, saying that Umaria was putting his own spin on it; there was no agreement on sharing the Mayoralty in the third year, Baba said. The election was a bittersweet experience for the SDL; they gained a majority in their own right in Suva, but lost control of Nasinu, Fiji's largest municipality.

=== 2006 parliamentary election ===
The SDL appointed former Fiji Development Bank Chairman Navitalai Naisoro to head a panel interviewing would-be parliamentary candidates for the SDL. The interviews began in the last week of August 2005. The party's general secretary, Jale Baba, had earlier said that the SDL was dissatisfied with the performance of about a third of its parliamentarians, and that they would not be nominated for another term. Names approved by the panel will be forwarded to the selection committee of the appropriate constituency, before a decision is finalized. On 27 February 2006, Baba, no longer general secretary but now coordinator of the election campaign, said that the selection process had begun and would take two to three weeks.

=== Indian candidates ===
On 12 August 2005, Baba claimed that three members of the opposition Fiji Labour Party's parliamentary caucus had applied for endorsement as SDL candidates for the parliamentary election scheduled to be held in mid-2006. He refused to name them, saying that to do so could prematurely end their political careers. The three were interviewed at 5am on an unrevealed date in early September to protect their identities, SDL president Ratu Kalokalo Loki said. The Fiji Live news service reported on 7 September that it had information that not three, but five, FLP members were interviewed.

SDL national director Jale Baba announced on 11 September 2005 that the party would contest all 71 parliamentary seats in the 2006 election. Indo-Fijian candidates would be nominated for open constituencies as well as communal constituencies reserved for Indo-Fijians. Baba said that byelections showed that Indo-Fijian support for the SDL had increased since 2001, when it hardly registered, and that the party was confident of winning most of the seats in 2006. On 2 October, Baba said that members of all ethnic communities, including Indo-Fijians, had applied for nomination, which he described as "a major change" for a party hitherto dominated by indigenous Fijians.

Baba announced On 4 January 2006 that 43 Indo-Fijians had been shortlisted. Their names had been forwarded to the party's constituency councils which would finalize nominations in due course. The SDL was not an exclusively indigenous party, he emphasized. "We look after the interests of all. We are strongly pro-Fijian but not exclusive. We do not restrict membership to other communities. Programs are there for everyone."

Prime Minister Qarase reiterated on 23 January 2006 that the party intended to contest all 71 seats.

FLP parliamentarian Poseci Bune challenged the FLP on 3 February 2006 to substantiate its assertion that three FLP caucus members had applied to contest the upcoming election on the SDL ticket. The claim was untrue and just a campaign gimmick, Bune alleged. Baba did not reply to the challenge, but announced on 20 February that two more FLP defectors had joined the three seeking SDL endorsement. Citing confidentiality rules, Baba refused to name them, but said they were all Indo-Fijians, bringing to 48 the number of ethnic Indians who would stand in the primary elections to choose SDL candidates in the third week of February. All told, 321 sought nomination for the 71 constituencies.

The SDL launched an Indian wing on 23 March 2006. Seventy supporters attended the public launch at Namaka, Nadi, with Ratu Suliano Matanitobua, a Cabinet Minister and Tui Namosi (Paramount Chief of Namosi) as the chief speaker. Matanitobua praised the Indo-Fijian contribution to Fiji, and asked them to support the SDL to move Fiji forward.

=== Retiring parliamentarians ===
Party Secretary Jale Baba said on 20 September that three SDL members of the present Cabinet had not sought the SDL nomination for the 2006 election. He declined to identify the ministers involved, but said they were stepping down for a variety of reasons. On 2 February 2006, Foreign Minister Kaliopate Tavola revealed that he was one who would not be seeking reelection.

=== Negotiations with NFP ===
Prime Minister Qarase also announced on 11 September that the SDL would attempt to negotiate preference deals with the National Federation Party (NFP) and the Fiji Labour Party (FLP) ahead of the 2006 election. He considered that parties dominated by the two respective principal races in the country needed each other's "preferences" under Fiji's so-called alternative vote system, which allows votes cast for low-polling candidates to be transferred to higher-polling candidates, as specified by the eliminated candidate.

The NFP said in August 2005 that it would withhold its preferences from the SDL unless it withdrew its controversial Reconciliation, Tolerance, and Unity Bill, but Qarase expressed the hope that "good sense" would prevail. Aiming to establish a commission with the power to compensate victims and pardon perpetrators of the 2000 coup, the legislation has been branded by opponents as a thinly veiled legal mechanism for freeing supporters of the present government, who have been convicted and imprisoned on coup-related charges. In September, however, the NFP appeared to adopt a somewhat more flexible position.

In the end, the NFP decided to give its preferences to the SDL in some constituencies, but not all. Prime Minister Qarase said that the NFP decision to give its preferences to the opposition Fiji Labour Party (FLP) in a number of marginal electorates was a breach of promise, and withdrew his own earlier offer to include the NFP in his post-election Cabinet.

=== Grand Coalition ===
On 30 July 2005, the SDL joined the Grand Coalition Initiative Group, an electoral alliance of predominantly indigenous Fijian parties that agreed to share preferences in the 2006 election. On 25 November, Prime Minister Qarase confirmed that the SDL would definitely share cooperate with members of the coalition, including the Soqosoqo ni Vakavulewa ni Taukei (SVT), and that he was having talks with SVT president Sitiveni Rabuka about sharing preferences.

=== Merger with CAMV ===
Prime Minister Qarase announced on 16 February 2006 that the Conservative Alliance (CAMV), the coalition partner of Qarase's SDL, would be formalizing a decision the next day to deregister itself in order to merge with the SDL.

=== Election result ===
In the election, held on 6–13 May, the SDL won 44 percent of the popular vote (including 81 percent of the ethnic Fijian vote), and 36 out of 71 seats. All 23 Communal Constituencies allocated to indigenous Fijians were won by the SDL, most of them overwhelmingly; the party also won 13 of the 25 Open Constituencies elected by universal suffrage. The SDL failed to make any significant inroads into the Indo-Fijian community, polling barely 2 percent of the Indo-Fijian vote, and also lost the one minority voters' constituency it had held.

The SDL-led government was ousted in the military coup of December 2006 - the first coup in Fiji to overthrow an SDL government rather than an FLP one.

=== Dissolution ===
In January 2013 the Fijian regime announced new political party registration rules which would require all parties to register their names in English. In response the party reformed as the Social Democratic Liberal Party (SODELPA).
