= 1999 Fijian general election =

- 8–15 May 1999

All 71 seats in the House of Representatives 36 seats needed for a majority
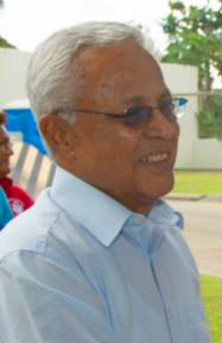

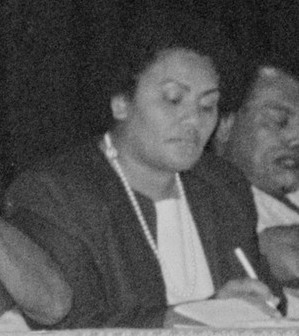

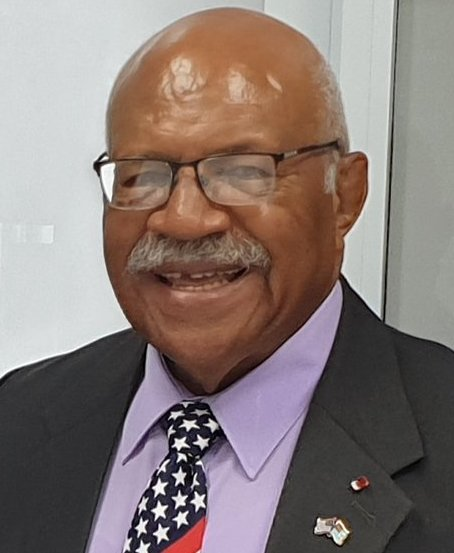

	First party	Second party	Third party
Leader	Mahendra Chaudhry	Kuini Speed	Sitiveni Rabuka
Party	Labour	FAP	SVT
Last election	7 seats	5 seats	31 seats
Seats won	37	10	8
Seat change	▲30	▲5	▼23
	Fourth party	Fifth party	Sixth party
		VLV	NVTLP
Leader	Sairusi Nagagavoka	Josaia Rayawa	Iliesa Duvuloco
Party	PNU	VLV	NVTLP
Last election	—	—	—
Seats won	4	3	2
Seat change	New	New	New
Prime Minister before election
Sitiveni Rabuka
SVT
Elected Prime Minister
Mahendra Chaudhry
Labour

General elections were held in Fiji between 8 and 15 May 1999. They were the first election held under the revised Constitution of 1997, which instituted a new electoral system and resulted in Mahendra Chaudhry taking office as Fiji's first Indo-Fijian Prime Minister, following a landslide victory for the Fiji Labour Party. It was also a wipeout loss for the incumbent Soqosoqo ni Vakavulewa ni Taukei (SVT) government of Sitiveni Rabuka, which lost all but eight seats and won less seats than the Fijian Association Party (FAP).

== Opinion polls ==
Pollster(s)	Date	Sample size	Rabuka		Chaudhry	
Pollster(s)	Date	Sample size	Satisfied	Dissatisfied	Satisfied	Dissatisfied
The Fiji Times	1996		23%	—N/a	—N/a	—N/a

== Results ==
Mahendra Chaudhry's Fiji Labour Party won all 19 Indo-Fijian seats, annihilating the National Federation Party which had traditionally been Fiji's dominant Indo-Fijian party; Indo-Fijian voters were angered by the NFP's decision to enter into an electoral coalition agreement with the Soqosoqo ni Vakavulewa ni Taukei of Prime Minister Sitiveni Rabuka, whom they had not forgiven for leading the military coup that removed an Indo-Fijian dominated government from power in 1987. In addition to the 19 Indo-Fijian seats, the Labour Party won 18 of the 25 "open electorates" for a total of 37 - an absolute majority in the 71-member House.

The Fijian Association Party, led by Adi Kuini Speed (the widow of former Prime Minister Timoci Bavadra), won 11 seats (10 ethnic Fijian and 1 open) against only 8 seats (5 ethnic Fijian and 3 open) for the Fijian Political Party, which had ruled the country since 1992. The Christian Democratic Alliance won 3 seats (2 ethnic Fijian and one open), while Apisai Tora's Party of National Unity won four ethnic Fijian seats. The United General Party won one "general" and one open electorate. The remaining six seats (two ethnic Fijian, two "general electorates," one Rotuman, and one open) were won by minor parties and independents.

Party	Open constituencies			Communal constituencies			Total seats
Party	Votes	%	Seats	Votes	%	Seats	Total seats
Fiji Labour Party	119,779	33.26	18	112,167	31.14	19	37
Soqosoqo ni Vakavulewa ni Taukei	75,063	20.85	3	68,114	18.91	5	8
National Federation Party	51,870	14.40	0	53,115	14.75	0	0
Fijian Association Party	38,863	10.79	1	34,044	9.45	9	10
Christian Democratic Alliance	35,395	9.83	0	34,758	9.65	3	3
Nationalist Vanua Tako Lavo Party	15,234	4.23	1	16,353	4.54	1	2
Party of National Unity	11,672	3.24	0	17,302	4.80	4	4
United General Party	4,732	1.31	1	5,412	1.50	1	2
United National Labour Party	1,985	0.55	0	1,978	0.55	0	0
Natural Law Party	109	0.03	0				0
Coalition of Independent Nationals	65	0.02	0	2,340	0.65	0	0
Lio 'On Famör Rotuma Party				1,982	0.55	0	0
Party of the Truth				234	0.06	0	0
Farmers and General Workers Coalition Party				197	0.05	0	0
Viti Levu Dynamic Multiracial Democratic Party				124	0.03	0	0
Nationalist Democratic Party				13	0.00	0	0
Independents	5,323	1.48	1	12,059	3.35	4	5
Total	360,090	100.00	25	360,192	100.00	46	71
Valid votes	360,090	90.76		360,192	90.26		
Invalid/blank votes	36,639	9.24		38,879	9.74		
Total votes	396,729	100.00		399,071	100.00		
Registered voters/turnout	434,658	91.27		431,566	92.47		
Source: Elections Office, Psephos, Nohlen et al.

== Aftermath ==
Many ethnic Fijians were unwilling to accept the result of the election, which was partly because their own votes had been so fragmented while those of Indo-Fijians had been much more united. President and "father of the nation" Ratu Sir Kamisese Mara worked behind the scenes, however, to persuade the main ethnic Fijian parties in parliament to accept Labour Party leader Mahendra Chaudhry as Prime Minister. To appease ethnic Fijians, Chaudhry gave 11 of the 18 Cabinet posts to native Fijian politicians. Following the power-sharing provisions of the Constitution, the Cabinet was composed of members of numerous political parties.

Not all ethnic Fijians were appeased, however. Simmering resentment exploded on 19 May 2000, when George Speight stormed the parliament buildings and kidnapped most members of the government, including Chaudhry in a coup.
