= House of Chiefs (Fiji) =

Fijian nobility

The House of Chiefs in Fiji consists of the Fijian nobility, composed of about seventy chiefs of various ranks, majority of which are related. It is not a formal political body and is not the same as the Great Council of Chiefs, a political body which had a prescribed role under the 1997 Constitution of Fiji, although the membership of the two bodies did overlap to a great extent.

== The social hierarchy ==
Fijian society is traditionally very stratified. A hierarchy of chiefs presides over villages (koro), sub-districts (tikina vou), districts (tikina cokavata), and provinces (yasana). These administrative divisions generally correspond roughly with the social units of the extended family (tokatoka), clan (mataqali), tribe (yavusa), and land (vanua). Each mataqali is presided over by a chief, styled Ratu if male or Adi (pronounced Ahn-di) if female. Chiefs presiding over units above the mataqali have other, more prestigious titles, although they, too, are typically addressed and referred to as Ratu or Adi, although there are regional variations. In Rewa, Ro is used instead of Ratu and Adi, while in the Lau Islands Roko is used. In Kadavu Group and in the west of Fiji, Bulou substitutes for Adi. The method of appointing chiefs is not uniform, although the position is generally held for life (with some exceptions) and there is a hereditary element, although the son of a chief does not automatically succeed to the position on his father's death. A chief may hold more than one title, just as a peer may in the United Kingdom; the late Ratu Sir Kamisese Mara, for example, was both Tui Nayau and Tui Lau.

== Provinces and confederacies ==
For administrative purposes, Fiji is divided into fourteen provinces, each of which has a Provincial Council in which the chiefs from the province are represented, along with commoners. Each Provincial Council is headed by a Roko Tui, whose appointment must be approved by the Fijian Affairs Board, a government department, which must also approve all bylaws passed and taxes levied by the Councils. (Titles can be deceptive: not every chief styled Roko Tui heads a Provincial Council). The Provincial Councils are significant in that they not only administer communally owned land (more than 80 percent of Fiji's total land area), but also elected most of the representatives to the Great Council of Chiefs. Moreover, the Great Council of Chiefs, which was charged with choosing 14 of the 32 members of the Fijian Senate, the upper house of the Parliament, normally delegated that task to the fourteen Provincial Councils.

All of the chiefs also belong to one of three confederacies: Kubuna, Burebasaga, and Tovata. For the most part, the boundaries of the confederacies correspond to the boundaries of the provinces. An anomaly exists in the west of the country, where the provinces of Ba and Ra are split between the confederacies of Kubuna and Burebasaga. This does not affect administration, however, as the confederacies and the provinces fulfill different roles, the former being based on the relationship of chiefs and clans, and the latter being formal political entities.

The highest chiefly title, the Tui Viti (King of Fiji), has been vacant since 1874, when King Seru Epenisa Cakobau and other prominent chiefs ceded the islands to the United Kingdom. But the Tui Viti title was relatively new; it was never a traditional kingly title of Fiji, but came into being after the death of Tanoa Visawaqa and the rise of his son Seru Epenisa Cakobau who proclaimed himself Tui Viti after conquering much of Fiji and persuading his fellow-chiefs to recognize him as their overlord.

However the title has been recognised since that time and the British monarch has filled a similar role since; even since Fiji became a republic in 1987, the former Great Council of Chiefs continued to recognise Queen Elizabeth II as its most senior chief, even though she ceased to be Queen of Fiji after Sitiveni Rabuka's two military coups in 1987, which overthrew the Dominion of Fiji and the 1970 Constitution of Fiji.

== List of Fijian chiefly titles ==
The following table depicts Fiji's districts, sub-districts, and villages, with their chiefs. Each chief, if known, is named in italics under his or her full formal title, which is in bold. The majority of chiefs rule over a group of villages (koro) belonging to a Tikina Vou (sub-district); some Tikina Vou are subdivided into two or more groupings of villages, each with its own chief. In a few cases, two groups of villages, or even two sub-districts, share a single chief. This is more common in Naitasiri Province than elsewhere. In the table, this is indicated by backgrounding in the same colour the areas shared by a chief. The Lau Islands are an anomaly: unlike the other provinces, their districts are not divided into sub-districts. All the 14 provinces have their own paramount chief with exceptions to Kadavu. Kadavu Province has nine chiefs; all are paramount in their own districts.

The districts, sub-districts, and villages are arranged, not alphabetically, but in the order of precedence of their chiefs. This order is not without controversy, but protocol generally observes it.

=== Ba ===
**Tikina Cokavata**
**(District)**
**Tikina Vou**
**(Sub-District)**
**Ai Cavuti (Chiefly Title)**
Ratu/Roko (Chief; named only if known)
Koro (Villages)
Ba
Bulu
**Na Vanua o Na Koronubu, Suwe Levu o Ba, Na Momo na Tui Ba (Tai o Bulu)**
Ratu Filimoni Nale (Note: Former chief of Bulu Sub-District was Ratu Sairusi Nagagavoka.)
Sorokoba, Natalecake [Tui Laba Sa], Togalevu [Tui Nakula], Vadravadra [Tui Navatu], Sasa, Natunuku.
Ba
Nailaga
**Na Vanua o Na Koronubu, Suwelevu o Nawaiviluri, na Momo na Tui Ba (Tiliva Bukuya)**
Vacant
Nailaga, Votua [Momo na Ratu], Nawaqarua [Momo na Ratu], Matawalu, Nasolo, Koroqaqa, Natutu
Magodro
Magodro
**Naroyasi na Momo na Tui Magodro**
Bukuya, Nadevo, Navaga, Tabalei, Tabuquto, Nasivikoso
Nacula
Nacula
**Korotuilagi na Turaga na Tui Drola**
Ratu Manasa Naikasowalu Bogileka
Nacula, Malakati [Ratu ni Drola] Seruvi Ratunidrola, Matacawalevu [Na Ratu], Vuaki [Tui Vuaki], Navotua [Tui Koro] Peniasi Vu Tuikoro, Naisisili [Dalituicama] Epineri Susu, Namatayalevu
**Momo na Ratu**
Yaqeta
Yasawa
**Vatanitawake na Momo na Tui Yasawa**
Yasawa Irara, Teci [Tui Teci], Daloma, Tamusua [Tinalevu], Bukama [Turaga na Ratu]
Nadi
Nadi
**Navatulevu na Momo na Tui Nadi**
Ratu Vuniani Dawai (Note: Former chief of Nadi Sub-District was disputed between Ratu Kaliova Dawai and Ratu Napolioni Naulia Dawai.)
Narewa, Nakavu, Namotomoto, Navoci
Dratabu
**Nakauvadra na Momo na Taukei Navo**
Ratu Meli Saukuru
Dratabu
Sikituru
Sikituru, Moala, Yavusania (Yavunsania), Korovuto
Nadrau
**Sawaieke na Vi-Bulou na Taukei Na Ua**

Saunaka

Naloto
Naloto
**Tabuatolu na Momo na Tui Naloto**
Toge, Balevuto, Nadrugu
Nalotawa
Nalotawa
**Namaravulevu na Momo na Tui Yakete**
Nalotawa, Navilawa, Nanuku, Tukuraki, Yaloku
Nasesevia
Nasesevia
**Momo na Tui Nasesevia Ratu Vilikesa Driu**
Nawaqadamu, Vunamoli, Uto
Naviti
Naviti
**Neilesu na Momo na Tui Naviti**
Ratu Kitione Vuluma
Soso, Kese, (Note: Formerly part of Marou Village Group, Naviti Sub-District, Naviti District, Ba Province.) Gunu, Muaira
**Nadikalagi na Marama na Tui Marou**
Marou, Somosomo (Malevu Somosomo)
Waya
**Nalotu na Momo na Tui Waya**
Yalobi, Natawa, Wayalevu, Nalauwaki (Naluwaki)
Viwa
**Werelevu Taiti, Momo na Tui Viwa**
Ratu Serupepeli Koroitaiti
Najia (Natia), Naibalebale, Yakani
Nawaka
Nawaka
**Nalagi na Momo na Tui Nawaka**
Ratu Joeli Bulu Derenalagi Naevo
Nawaka, Vatutu, Namulomulo, Yavuna (Evuna), Tubenasolo
Qwaliyatina
Qwaliyatina
**Qwaliyalatina, lauvatu i Narata, vua na Momo na i-Taukei Qwaliyalatina**
Navala, Nakoroboya
Rukuruku
Rukuruku
**Nakainiyasawa na Momo na Tui Rukuruku Ratu Ilaisa Nabati**
Rararua, Dreke
Sabeto
Sabeto
**Erenavula na Momo Levu na Tui Sabeto**
Ratu Vilame Mataitoga
Koroyaca, Narokorokoyawa, Natalau, Naboutini, Nadele (Korobebe)
Tavua
Tavua
**Bila vua na Turaga na Tui Tavua**
Ratu Nacanieli Uqeuqe (Note: Former chief of Tavua Sub-District was Ratu Ovini Bokini.)
Tavualevu, Nabuna, Korovou, Vatutavui (Vatuvui), Nadelei; Natolevu, Rabulu
Tilavalevu
Nubu
**Tilivalevu na Momo na Taukei Nubu**
Nadala(Vatucere), Waikubukubu.
Tilivasewa
Savatu
**Tilivasewa na Momo na Taukei Cawa ni Sa**
Nagatagata, Lewa, Vatucere, Naiyaca, Taunabe, Buyabuya, Koro
Vaturu
Vaturu
**Momo na Tui Yalatina**
Nagado, Natawa
Vitogo
Vitogo
**Sukanacagi na Momo na Tui Vitogo**
Ratu Viliame Sovasova
Vitogo, Naviyago
**Momo na iTaukei Vidilo**

Ratu Viliame Bouwalu
Namoli, Saru

**Kenani na Momo na i Taukei Saqele**
Vakabuli
Vuda
Vuda
**Vunisei na Momo na Tui Vuda**
Ratu Eparama Kitione Tavaiqia (Note: Former chief of Vuda Sub-District was Ratu Josefa Iloilovatu Uluivuda.)
Viseisei (Veiseisei), Lauwaki, Lomolomo, Namara, Abaca

=== Bua ===
**Tikina Cokavata** **(District)**	**Tikina Vou** **(Sub-District)**	**Ai Cavuti (Chiefly Title)**; Ratu (Chief; named only if known); Koro (Villages)
Bua	Bua	**Cakaunitabua na Turaga na Tui Bua**; Bua, Navunievu, Koroinasolo, Tiliva, Nawailevu, Dalomo, Waitabu
Bua	Navakasiga	**Turaga na Buli Navakasiga**; Naviqiri, Nasau, Naivaka
Bua	Lekutu	**Turaga na Buli Lekutu**; Votua, Namuavoivoi, Banikea, Kavula, Tavea, Galoa, Nasorowaqa, Yagaqa
Wainunu	Wainunu	**Turaga na Buli Wainunu**; Daria, Nakorotiki, Nakawakawa, Cogea, Navakasali, Nadua, Saolo
Wainunu	Solevu	**Turaga na Ai Sualevu**; Nawaido, Cavaga
Wainunu	Nadi	**Turaga na Buli Navere**; Nasavu, Nasolo, Nasawana, Sawani
Vuya	Vuya	**Vuya na Turaga Buli Vuya**; Navave, Vuya, Mokolei (Makolei) (Note: Formerly part of Solevu Sub-District, Wainunu District, Bua Province.)
Vuya	Vuya	**Turaga na Buli Raviravi**; Nabouwalu, Wairiki, Yadua
Vuya	Dama	**Dama na Buli Dama**; Dama, Nasau, **Nacawa**, Tavuloma, Naruwai, Nagadoa, Driti
Vuya	Kubulau	**Kubulau na Buli Kubulau**; Kiobo, Namalata, Raviravi, Navatu, Waisa, Nasasaivua, Natokalau, Nakorovou, Nadivakarua, Kilaka

=== Cakaudrove ===
**Tikina Cokavata** **(District)**	**Tikina Vou** **(Sub-District)**	**Ai Cavuti (Chiefly Title)**; Ratu (Chief; named only if known); Koro (Villages)
Cakaudrove	Cakaudrove	**Lalagavesi na Turaga na Tui Cakau na Ai Sokula**; Ratu Naiqama Tawake Lalabalavu; Somosomo, Loa, Lovonivonu, Nakobo, Nabagasau, Nanuca, Nawi, Dakuniba, Tavuki
Cakaudrove	Cakaudrove	**Navunisa na Tui Taveuni**; Ratu Epeli Ganilau; Welagi, Yacata
Cakaudrove	Vuna	**Na Turaga na Sau kei Vuna** (Note: Current Tui Vuna has yet to be bestowed the Title of "Sau ni Vanua O Vuna".); Ratu Aporosa Rageci; Kanacea, Nakorovou-Vuna, Navakawau
Wainikeli	Laucala	**Turaga na Tui Laucala**; Dreketi, Kocoma, Naqelelevu, Toga, Yanuca (Note: Partially shared within Wainikeli Sub-District, Wainikeli District, Cakaudrove Province.)
Wainikeli	Wainikeli	**Turaga na Tuwei**; Ratu Talemo Ratakele; Naselesele, Lavena, Korovou, Naiviivi, Nadilo, Qeleni, Vidawa, Waitabu, Yanuca (Note: Partially shared within Laucala Sub-District, Wainikeli District, Cakaudrove Province.)
Tunuloa	Tunuloa	**Turaga na Tui Tunuloa**; Ratu Karalo Maibuca; Kanakana, Karoko, Koroivonu, Muana, Naqaravatu, Navetau, Salia, Wailevu, Nailou
Tunuloa	Natewa	**Sovatabua na Turaga na Vunivalu**; Ratu Ifereimi Buaserau (Note: Former chief of Natewa Sub-District was Ratu Viliame Gasagasa.); Natewa, Buca, Dawa, Tukavesi, Vusaratu, Vusasivo, Nadavaci
Nasavusavu	Savusavu	**Turaga na Tui Nasavusavu**; Yaroi, Naidi
Nasavusavu	Savusavu	**Turaga na Tunisa**; Ratu Suliano Naulu; Nagigi, Nacavanadi, Nacekoro, Nukubalavu, Savudrodro, Vivili, Waivunia
Nasavusavu	Naweni	**Turaga na Tui Naweni**; Tacilevu, Naweni, Dromuninuku
Nasavusavu	Navatu	**Naqorovarua na Ratu i Navatu**; Ratu Samisoni Mainavukea Wainiu; Drekeniwai, Korolevu, Koronatoga, Korosi, Navakaka, Tabia, Leia
Nasavusavu	Navatu	**Turaga na Tui Navadra**; Viani, Nasinu
Vaturova	Vaturova	**Turaga na Tui Vaturova**; Ratu Wilisoni Rokotuibua; Korotasere, Lekutulevu, Nakuku, Nayarabale, Domokavu, Seyavaci, Vanuavou, Korokuli, Vaturamulo, Wavu, Nakorobo, Vatukuca, Culaga
Vaturova	Koroalau	**Turaga na Tui Koroalau**; Vuinadi, Bucalevu, Nakawaga, Nabua, Nukubolu, Vunidogoloa
Vaturova	Wairiki	**Turaga na Tui Wairiki**; Suweni, Navakuru, Satulaki, Matalolo
Saqani	Saqani	**Turaga na Buli Saqani**; Saqani, Lakeba, Malake, Biaugunu, Naboutini, Nadogo, Nacula, Natuvu, Navetau, Sese, Volivoli, Vuniwai, Cuku, Vela, Vanuami, Waivula, Naiyalayala
Saqani	Tawake	**Turaga na Vunivalu**; Tawake, Nagasauva, Vatu, Wainigadru, Wainiika, Yasawa
Wailevu	Wailevu West	**Turaga na Tui Wailevu**; Ratu Kinijoji Maivalili; Valeni, Batiri, Nayarailagi, Naiqaqi, Vatuvonu, Dawara, Vunidawamoli, Natuvu, Laucala
Wailevu	Wailevu East	Wailevu, Vakativa, Waisali, Buca, Nasawana, Nakasa, Natua, Vunivesi, Navatukawa, Vuadomo, Urata

=== Kadavu ===
**Tikina Cokavata**
**(District)**
**Tikina Vou**
**(Sub-District)**
**Ai Cavuti (Chiefly Title)**
Ratu (Chief; named only if known)
Koro (Villages)
Tavuki
Tavuki
**Nacolase na Turaga na Tui Tavuki**
Ratu Ilitomasi Waqanivavalagi
Tavuki, Baidamudamu, Nukunuku, Nagonedau, Solodamu, Natumua, Waisomo, (Note: Partially shared within Ono Sub-District, Nakasaleka District, Kadavu Province.) Namuana, Namalata, Galoa, Cevai
Ravitaki
**Namanusa na Marama na Tui Ravitaki**
Bulou Mereseini Laliqavota
Wailevu, Mokoisa, Muani, Ravitaki, Solovola, Matanuku, Nasegai
**Nalovani na Roko Tui Drawe**
Nasegai
Sanima
**Nawaimalua Turaga na Tui Drue**
Drue, Navuatu, Naikorokoro, Naivakarauniniu, Namara, Mataso
Nabukelevu
Nabukelevu
**Valesasa na Turaga na Tui Nabukelevu**
Ratu Apakuki Nanovo
Daviqele, Dagai, Talaulia, Lomati, Nabukelevuira, Qalira, Nasau, (Note: Partially shared within Nasau-Vunivalu Village Group, Nabukelevu Sub-District, Nabukelevu District, Kadavu Province.) Kabariki, Levuka, (Note: Partially shared within Levuka Village Group, Nabukelevu Sub-District, Nabukelevu District, Kadavu Province.) Muaninuku, Tabuya
**Lewenisau na Gone Turaga na Vunivalu**
Nasau
**Nakaiolo na Marama na Tui Levuka**
Levuka, (Note: Partially shared within Nabukelevu Village Group, Nabukelevu Sub-District, Nabukelevu District, Kadavu Province.) Muaninuku, Tabuya
Yawe
**Valedaidaiga Turaga na Tui Yawe**
Ratu Tevita Waqanivalu
Nalotu, Natokalau, Korovou, Yakita, Naqalotu, Tawava
Naceva
Naceva
**Koroisoso na Turaga na Tui Naceva**
Ratu Joni Duikete
Soso, Vukavu, Kadavu, Jioma, Niudua, Nacomoto, Dravuwalu, Muanisolo, Vunisei, Daku, Yavitu
Yale
**Naivibati Na Vunisalevu na Tui Yale Na Vunisalevu Na Tui Nabou**
'Ratu Navitalai Litidamu (Tui Yale)

Rakiraki, Gasele, Nauciwai, Levuka, Naioti

Nakasaleka
Nakasaleka
**Nabala na Turaga na Tui Nakasa**
Ratu Nacibaba
Nakoronawa, Lomanikoro, Nakaunakoro, Nakaugasele, Kavala, Lawaki, Solotavui, Tiliva, Matasawalevu, Nukuvou, Vacalea
Ono

Bulou Elenoa Misikini (Tui Vabea)' (Note: Former chief of Natewa Sub-District was Bulou Salote Vavaitamana.)
Vabea, Waisomo (TUI ONO), Narikoso, Naqara, Nabouwalu (Roko Vaka), Buliya, Dravuni (Ramalo)

=== Lau ===
**Tikina** **(District)**	**Ai Cavuti (Chiefly Title)**; Ratu, Roko (Chief; named only if known); Koro (Villages)
Lakeba	**Vuanirewa na Turaga na Tui Nayau**; Ratu Tevita Lutunauga Kapaiwai Uluilakeba Mara
Lakeba	Oneata	**Bukatatanoa na Turaga na Tui Oneata**; Waiqori, Dakuiloa
Moce	**Delaimakotu na Turaga na Ramasi**; Nasau, Korotolu
Vulaga	**Vanuaseu na Turaga na Tui Vulaga**; Muanaira, Muanaicake, Naividamu, Ogea
Ono	**Naduruvesi, na Turaga na Tui Ono**; Nukuni, Lovoni, Matokana, Doi, Vatoa
Kabara	**Turaga na Tui Kabara**; Naikeleyaga, Tokalau, Lomaji, Udu, Namuka, Komo
Totoya	**Lomanikoro na Turaga na Roko Sau**; Roko Josefa Delainauluvatu; Tovu, Ketei, Dravuwalu, Udu, Vanuavatu
Moala	**Nai Vucu ni Masi na Turaga na Tui Nasau/Yavusa Turagalevu na Turaga na Tui Moala**; Naroi, Nasoki, Keteira, Vunuku, Cakova, Vadra, Maloku, Muaikacuni
Matuku	**Burotukula na Turaga na Tui Matuku**; Yaroi, Nakabati, Qalikarua, Levukaidaku, Makadru, Raviravi, Lomaji
Nayau	**Vuanirewa na gone Turaga na Tui Nayau**, Salia, (Note: Chiefly title is Devobalavu Turaga na Tui Devo.) Liku, (Note: Chiefly title is Turaga na Tui Liku.) Narocivo (Note: Chiefly title is Maumi Turaga na Tui Naro.)
Lomaloma	**Turaga Na Ravunisa**, **Turaga na Rasau**, **Tui Naturuku**, ' Lomaloma, Susui, Narocivo, Namalata, Uruone, Levukana, Dakuiloma, Tuvuca
Lomaloma	**Rara Tabu vua na Turaga na Tui Lau**; Sawana (Yavusa Toga)
Mualevu	**Turaga na Sau kei Mualevu, na Tui Mavana**; Mualevu, Mavana, Daliconi, Malaka, Muamua, Boitaci, Cikobia, Yavea
Cicia	**Walakewa na Turaga na Tui Cicia**; Tarukua, Natokalau, Lomaji, Mabula, Naceva

=== Lomaiviti ===
**Tikina Cokavata** **(District)**	**Tikina Vou** **(Sub-District)**	**Ai Cavuti (Chiefly Title)**; Ratu (Chief; named only if known); Koro (Villages)
Ovalau	Levuka	**Nabukebuke na Turaga na Tui Levuka**; Ratu Seru Rokotuinaceva (Note: Former chief of Levuka Sub-District was Kolinio Rokotuinaceva.); Levuka, Vagadaci, Waitovu, Vuma (Levukanaeloma Turaga na Roko Tui Vuma) (Note: Chiefly title is Levukanaeloma na Turaga na Roko Tui Vuma.) Toki, Vatukalo, Nawowo, Yaravudi, Taviya, Rukuruku
Ovalau	Nasinu	**Rokotuibau na Rokotakala Ratu Viliame Ratuvosaki**; Nasinu, Naikorokoro, Tokou **Nalulu na Gone Turaga na Roko Tui Tokou** Natokalau (Narocake na Turaga na Tui Naro), Draiba
Ovalau	Lovoni	**Wailevu na Turaga na Tui Wailevu**; Lovoni, Nacobo, Nukutocia, Visoto, Vuniivisavu
Ovalau	Bureta	**Turaga na Ratu**; Naiviteitei, Nasaga (Nasoga), Navuloa; Tai, Vucibuli, Waidau
Ovalau	Moturiki	**Turaga na Ratu**; Niubasaga, Nasesara, Navuti, Nasauvuki, Naicabecabe, Yanuca, Daku, Uluibau, Sovuna, Wawa, Nasauraki
Batiki	Batiki	**Turaga Tora ni Bau**; Yavu, Mua, Manuku, Naigani
Koro	Mudu	**Mata ni Mudu**; Mudu, Tuatua, Nagaidamu, Sinuvaca, Nasau, Nacamaki, Nakodu, Namacu
Koro	Cawa	**Gone Turaga na Tui Naigani**; Nabasovi, Vatulele, Nabuna, Tavua, Navaga, Kade
Nairai	Nairai	**Kubuna i Wai na Turaga na Tui Nairai**; Natauloa, Tovulailai, Lawaki, Vutuna, Waitoga
Gau	Sawaieke	**Nadawa na Turaga na Takalai-Gau**; Vacant (Note: Former chief of Sawaieke Sub-District was Ratu Marika Uluinadawa Lewanavanua.); Sawaieke, Somosomo, Nawaikama, Nukuloa, Levukaigau, Lovu, Vadravadra, Yadua
Gau	Navukailagi	**Naiviqeleqele na Turaga na Ratu**; Navukailagi (Turaga na Ratu), Baravi, Vione (Takala), Qarani (Tui Qarani)
Gau	Vanuaso	**Yavusa Turagalewena, Turaga na Tui Vanuaso, na Vunivalu**; Vanuaso, Lekanai, Nacavanadi, Malawai, Lamiti

=== Macuata ===
**Tikina Cokavata** **(District)**	**Tikina Vou** **(Sub-District)**	**Ai Cavuti (Chiefly Title)**; Ratu (Chief; named only if known); Koro (Villages)
Macuata	Macuata	**Caumatalevu na Turaga na Tui Macuata**; Ratu Wiliame Katonivere (Note: Former chief of Macuata Sub-District was Ratu Aisea Katonivere.); Macuataiwai, Ligau, Nakalou, Namama, Navouono, Nabukadogo, Naduri, Naqumu, Nasuva, Navidamu, Daku, Niurua, Raviravi (Ravuravu), Yaro, Vatuboroboro, Buavou
Macuata	Mali	**Turaga na taukei Davetalevu - Turaga na Tui Mali**; Apenisa Bogiso; Nakawaga, Ligaulevu, Matailabasa, Vesi
Macuata	Dreketi	**Uluitoga na Vunivalu Turaga na Tui Dreketi**; Ratu Maculeku Rokocegu; Nabavatu, Nakanacagi, Nabiti, Nasigasiga, Vunisea, Nasea, Lutukina
Cikobia	Cikobia	**Turaga na Tui Cikobia**; Vatulele, Nautovatu, Vuninuku, Nalele
Dogotuki	Namuka	**Namuka vua na Qaqa**; Ratu Tevita Niumataiwalu Visoqo, Lakeba, Nabubu, Nasovivi, Naua, Gevo, Naisamuwaqa, Cawadevo, Qelewara, Nasovi, Solevukoso, Delaivadra, Ravuka
Dogotuki	Dogotuki	**Turaga na Tui Vuna / Marama na Tui Vuna**; Rauriko, Lagi, Namukalau, Kedra, Vitina, Nabourewa, Nabuna, Qaranivai, Vugalei, Nayaroyaro
Dogotuki	Udu	**Vua na Sauvou**; Ratu Emori Nabiri Waqanivalu; Vunikodi, Nukusa, Cawaro, Nabouono, Nukudamu
Sasa	Sasa	**Turaga na Taukei Sasa**; Adi Ana Valotu; Sasa, Korotubu, Namakomako, Nasealevu, Navakasobu, Korovuli, Tabia, Vuiraqilai
Sasa	Seaqaqa	**Turaga na Masi e Seaqaqa**; Naravuka, Nanenivuda, Batiri, Nacaurokovi, Nacereyaga, Natua, Saivou, Nayarailagi, Vesidrua, Lomaloma
Labasa	Labasa	**Wasavulu na Turaga na Tui Labasa**; Ratu Adi Salanieta Ritova; Nasekula, Nakorowiri, Batinikama, Vunimoli, Dreketilailai, Namoli, Vunivau, Vuo, Mataniwai, Bulileka, Nubuniyavula, Qelemumu, Raranibulubulu, Nacula, Naqai, Waikisi
Labasa	Nadogo	**Turaga na Tui Nadogo**; Ratu Viliame Rovabokola; Vunivutu, Kavewa, Nabutubutu, Nasasa
Labasa	Nadogo	**Turaga na Tui Nubu**; Nubu, Mouta, Nakelikoso, Navakebuli, Sogobiau, Caurokorika
Labasa	Wailevu	**Turaga na Tui Wailevu**; Ratu Rokodewala Niumataiwalu; Wailevu, Nakama, Vatulovona, Vuinakawakawa, Savusavutaga, Wakanilato, Nasaqa, Yaudigi, Dogoru (Dogocu)

=== Nadroga-Navosa ===
**Tikina Cokavata** **(District)**	**Tikina Vou** **(Sub-District)**	**Ai Cavuti (Chiefly Title)**; Ratu (Chief; named only if known); Koro (Villages)
Cuvu	Cuvu	**Nakuruvakarua i Louvatu na Ka Levu**; Ratu Tevita Makutu III (Note: Former chief of Cuvu Sub-District was Ratu Sakiusa Makutu.); Cuvu, Navuevu (Nayevuyevu), Tore, Yadua, Rukurukulevu, Hanahana, Hila (Sila)
Cuvu	Tuva	**Leweniyarayara na Taukei Vunawi**; Ratu Jolame Vosailagi; Vouwa, Nadroumai, Togovere, Semo, Nabau, Kabisi, Emuri, Niu Yoka
Sigatoka	Nasigatoka	**Louvatu Were Levu i Were ni Dri**; Vacant; Nahigatoka (Nasigatoka), Yavulo, Nahama, Vunavutu, Volivoli
Sigatoka	Nasigatoka	**Turaga na Tui Madudu**; Ratu Jone V Butucama; Nayawa, Lahelahe
Sigatoka	Nokonoko	**Turaga na Tui Tabanivonoicake**; Ratu Marika Bulikula Ulunisau; Naduri, Lawai, Nakabuta (Nakabuto), Nakalavo, Vunatovau, Tilivalevu (Kilivalevu), Qereqere
Sigatoka	Waicoba	**Turaga na Tui Nasesevia**; Narewa, Vagadra, Narata
Malomalo	Malomalo	**Turaga na Tui Nasosowaqa**; Malomalo
Malomalo	Malomalo	**Taukei Nasoqo**; Hanahana (Nadivi)
Malomalo	Malomalo	**Tui Nasoni**; Nalele, Sanasana, Vuhama, Navihabahaba, Batiri, Togobula
Malomalo	Raviravi	**Turaga na Tui Tabanivoniwai**; Momi, Yako, Nabila
Malomalo	Wai	**Nalolo na Turaga na Tui Nalolo**; Lomawai, Kubuna, Nakorokula, Navutu, Tau, Bavu
Baravi	Conua	**Nabili Turaga na Tui Conua**; Sikeli Tawake; Vatukarasa, Malevu, Korotogo, Naroro, Nawamagi, Narata (Baravi), Nadrala
Baravi	Komave	**Vusu na Turaga na Tui Vusu**; Komave, Namatakula, Biausevu, Navola
Baravi	Korolevuiwai	**Turaga na Tui Davutukia i wai** Votua, Votualailai, Tagaqe, Namada
Baravi	Koroinasau	**Turaga na Tui Davutukia i vanua** Balenabelo, Vunayayawa, Saru, Sovi (Sauvi)
Ruwailevu	Mavua	**Turaga na Qali Mavua**; Raiwaqa, Mavua, Tubeirata
Ruwailevu	Naqalimare	**Turga na Tui Qalimare**; Koronisagana, Sautabu, Natawatawadji, Toga, Vunaqoru, Naveyago (Raveyaga), Koroua (Korona), Rarabasaga
Ruwailevu	Bemana	**Koroinasau Davutukia Na Tui Davutukia**; Tonuve, Tuvu, Volinagerua (Vulinagerua), Nailebaleba
Ruwailevu	Nasikawa	**Nasikawa na Tui Nasikawa**; Nawairabe, Korovou, Matokana
Navosa	Namataku	**Turaga na Taukei Nasaunivalu**; Keiyas.
Navosa	Namataku	**Turaga na Tui Namataku**; Sawene, Wauosi, Nausori, Navula, Edrau (Yadrau), Draiba, Nasaucoko.
Navosa	Noikoro	**Koroivabeka na Turaga na Tui Noikoro**; Ratu Tomasi Latianara; Korolevu, Namoli, Nukuilau, Vatubalavu, Nubuyanitu, Draubuta (Drobuta), Noikoro, Viti Levu, Wema
Navosa	Nadrau	**Turaga na Tui Nadrau**; Nadrau, Nabawaqa, Qalinasau, Naga (Vanua Levu)
Navosa	Navatusila	**Turaga na Tui Navatusila**; Nabutautau, Sauvakarua, Nanuku, Tuvavatu
Vatulele	Vatulele	**Vunisalevu na Tui Ekubu**; Ratu Joji Toge; Ekubu, Taunovo, Lomanikaya, Bouwaqa
Malolo	Malolo	**Turaga na Tui Lawa**; Ratu Iliesa Ratunavu Neitauniyalo; Solevu, Yaro, Tavua, Yanuya (Yanuca)

=== Naitasiri ===
**Tikina Cokavata** **(District)**	**Tikina Vou** **(Sub-District)**	**Ai Cavuti (Chiefly Title)**; Ratu (Chief; named only if known); Koro (Villages)
Naitasiri	Naitasiri	**Matanikutu na Turaga na Qaranivalu**; Ratu Inoke Takiveikata; Navuso, Tamavua, Kalabu, Vuniniudrovu, Kasavu, Nacokaika, Naganivatu, Nakini, Natoaika (Natowaika), Delaidamanu, Waitolu, Drekeiwaila
Naitasiri	Vuna	**Roko Tui Vuna na Turaga na Vunivalu**; Ro Alipate Macanawai Raicebe; Sawani, Navatuvula, Colo-i-Suva
Lomaivuna	Viria	**Nakorolevu na Turaga na Vunivalu**; Viria, Naqali, Namuamua, Gusuisuva, Navolau, Natavea, Nataveaira
Lomaivuna	Navuakece	**Navuakece na Turaga na Vunivalu**; Navutu, Nawaqabena, Korovou, Vatuili, Delaiwaimale, Waisa
Lomaivuna	Rara	**Rara Naqaranikula na Turaga na Vunivalu**; Ratu Ilaitia Rovutiqica; Naluwai, Waidracia, Nasavu
Lomaivuna	Nabaitavo	**Burenitu na Turaga na Vunivalu**; Nabaitavo, Navoka
Waimaro	Waidina	**Waimaro na Marama na Roko Tui Waimaro**; Adi Pateresio Vonokula; Nabukaluka, Nadakuni, Lomai, Vanuakula, Nauluvatu, Navurevure, Wainawaqa, Nasirotu, Nasele, Naseuvou, Delailasakau
Waimaro	Soloira	**Waimaro na Turaga na Roko Tui Waimaro**; Waikalou, Navatukia, Vunidawa
Matailobau	Matailobau	**Siko i Nabena na i Taukei ni Waluvu**; Nairukuruku, Navuniyasi, Taulevu, Delaitoga, Nabena
Matailobau	Matailobau	**Turaga na Vunivalu**; Matailobau
Matailobau	Waima	**Siko Koroqele na Turaga na Vunivalu**; Nakorovatu, Naqara, Vusiga
Matailobau	Lutu	**Lutu na Turaga na Tui Lutu**; Lutu, Navuniyaro, Nukuloa
Matailobau	Nagonenicolo	**Waimaro, Delai na Ulucavu na Turaga na Vunivalu**; Nakorosule, Waibalavu, Nawaisomo, Wairuarua, Nasalia, Laselevu, Udu
Wainimala	Noimalu	**Railevu na Tui Nakurukuruvakatini**; Nakorokoroyawa, Korovou, Matawailevu, Nasava, Nasauvere, Tubarua
Wainimala	Muaira	**Navunitivi na Turaga na Vunivalu**; Lutu, Matainasau, Waibasaga, Botenaulu, Sawanikula, Nabukunivatu, Bulibulinakuro, Nadovu
Wainimala	Nadaravakawalu	**Navatusila na Turaga na Vunivalu**; Ratu Vereimi Rovitivau Rinakama; Naivucini, Saumakia, Naitauvoli, Nuku
Wainimala	Nabobuco	**Bureca Turaga na Tui Nabobuco**; Naqelewai, Rewasau, Nasiriti, Nasoqo, Roma

=== Namosi ===
**Tikina Cokavata** **(District)**	**Tikina Vou** **(Sub-District)**	**Ai Cavuti (Chiefly Title)**; Ratu (Chief; named only if known); Koro (Villages)
Namosi	Namosi	**Nabukebuke na Turaga na Tui Namosi na Vunivalu**; Ratu Suliano Matanitobua; Namosi, Navunibau, Navuniyasitu, Narukunibua, Waivaka, Naduruyasi
Wainikoroiluva	Wainikoroiluva	**Namuamua Nabukebuke na Turaga na Tui Namosi na Vunivalu**; Namuamua, Nukusere, Nakavika, Navunikabi, Saliyadrau
Wainikoroiluva	Veinuqa	Nasoqo, Wainilotulevu, Korovou, Wainiyavu, Burotu, Vunidavo
Wainikoroiluva	Naqarawai	**Nabukebuke na Turaga na Tui Namosi na Vunivalu**; Naqarawai, Wainimakutu, Naraiyawa
Veivatuloa	Veivatuloa	**Nabukebuke na Turaga na Tui Namosi na Vunivalu**; Veivatuloa, Mau, Nabukavesi, Qilai, Navunisoco, Lobau, Namelimeli, Nakavu; Nakasanaura

=== Ra ===
**Tikina Cokavata**
**(District)**
**Tikina Vou**
**(Sub-District)**
**Ai Cavuti (Chiefly Title)**
Ratu (Chief; named only if known)
Koro (Villages)
Saivou
Naroko
**Turaga na Leweinavatudamu**
Rewasa, Vatukacevaceva
**Tui Yavulevu**
Nokonoko, Vaidoko, Narara, Danivau, Naboutolu
Tokaimalo
**Navunivau na Turaga na Vunivalu**
Nayaulevu, Mataveikai, Nabalebale, Vunisea, Vuniyaumunu, Nailawa, Naraviravi, Naivutu, Navarai
Saivou
**Burelevu vua na Turaga na Ratu ni Natauiya**

Ratu Sakiusa Taukena
Nanukuloa, Barotu, Naiserelagi, Tokio, Rokoroko

Nailuva
**Turaga na Tui Korosovaulevu**
Nailuva, Nararavou, Balasere, Naqelecibi, Namasia
Nalaba
**Tokineke na Turaga na Leweitokineke**
Burelevu, Nativi, Namara
Rakiraki
Rakiraki
**Turaga na Tu Ko Navitilevu**
Ratu Emori Bolobolo
Navatulevu, Vatusekiyasawa, Navuavua, Malake
Raviravi
**Raviravi na Turaga na Tui Navatu**
Drauniivi (Nadrauniivi), Togovere, Vunitogoloa, Naivuvuni, Narewa, Vitawa, (Note: Formerly part of Rakiraki Sub-District, Rakiraki District, Ra Province.) Rabulu, Naseyani, Nananu
Navolau
**Turaga na Ratu ni Natokea**
Navolau I, Namuaimada, Navolau II
Nakorotubu
Nakorotubu
**Turaga na Gonesau**

Ratu Jioji Tuwai Malani
Namarai, Naocobau, Verevere, Saioko, Nadavacia

Bureiwai
**Burenitu na Turaga na Tui Dama**
Delaiyadua, Nadogoloa, Matainananu, Naivoco
Kavula
**Turaga na Gonesau**
Nabukadra, Nayavutoka
Bureivanua
**Leweinamolibale na Turaga na Vunivalu**
Sowa, Balekinaga, Nalidi, Matuku
Nakuilava
**Leweinamatagi na Turaga na Vunivalu**
Bucalevu, Toki, Draunaleka, Tobu, Savulotu, Dama
Mataso
**Leweinamatagi na Turaga na Vunivalu**
Narikoso, Nakorovou
Navitilevu
**Navitilevu vua na Turaga na Tui Navitilevu**

Ratu Kadavu Mara
Nayavuira, Navuniivi, Nasau, Veidrala

Nalawa
Lawaki
**Turaga na Tu Navitilevu**
Nakorovou, Nawairuku, Namara, Sawenivo
Nasau
**Nasau na Turaga na Tui Nasau**
Ratu Isoa Nayasikalou
Nadawa, Ovalau, Vanuakula, Nubumakita, Nukulau, Nasukamai, Nauria
Nalawa
**Nacobicibici Gone Turaga Tui Nalawa**
Ratu Epeli Niudamu
Matawailevu, Nausori, Burenitu
Nababa
**Nababa na Turaga na Ratu**
Rokovuaka, Navitilevu, Nalalawa

=== Rewa ===
**Tikina Cokavata** **(District)**	**Tikina Vou** **(Sub-District)**	**Ai Cavuti (Chiefly Title)**; Ratu (or Ro) Chief; named only if known); Koro (Villages)
Rewa	Rewa	**Burebasaga na Gone Marama Bale na Roko Tui Dreketi na Vunivalu**; Ro Teimumu Vuikaba Tuisawau Kepa; Lomanikoro, Nasigatoka, Nukutubu, Nabua, Nasilai, Drekena, Vunuku, Tavuya, Nukui, Narocivo, Lokia; Nadoi
Rewa	Vutia	**Turaga na Tunidau**; Muanaicake, Muanaira, Laucala
Rewa	Toga	**Vunisalevu na Turaga na Tui Toga**; Ratu Aporosa Todua; Navatuyaba, Vunisei, Muana
Noco	Noco	**Vunisalevu na Ratu na Tui Noco**; Ratu Isoa Damudamu; Nabudrau, Nakuruwai, Nacuru, Taci, Nakauwaru, Navaka, Matanimoli, Naqarani, Naivilaca, Narocake
Noco	Burebasaga	**Gone Turaga na Roko Tuni**; Burebasaga, Waivou, Naivikasara, Suva Lailai
Noco	Dreketi	**Turaga na Roko Tui Nadugaca**; Rt Tevita Bukarau; Vunisinu, Nalase, Nabuli, Nadoria, Nakorovou
Suva	Suva	**Turaga na Tui Suva**; Ratu Sanaila Mudunavosa; Suvavou, Waiqanake, Muaivuso, Togalevu, Lami, Nabaka, Wainawa, Naivikinikini; Kalokolevu, Namakala
Beqa	Sawau	**Nacurumoce na Turaga na Tui Sawau**; Ratu Timoci Matanitobua; Dakuibeqa, Dakuni, (Note: Formerly part of Raviravi Sub-District, Beqa District, Rewa Province.) Soliyaga, Naceva, Rukua
Beqa	Raviravi	**Raralevu, Vunisalevu na Turaga na Tui Raviravi**; Ratu Kevueli Tavainavesi; Raviravi, Nawaisomo, Lalati (Note: Formerly part of Sawau Sub-District, Beqa District, Rewa Province.)

=== Serua ===
**Tikina Cokavata** **(District)**	**Tikina Vou** **(Sub-District)**	**Ai Cavuti (Chiefly Title)**; Ratu (Chief; named only if known); Koro (Villages)
Serua	Serua	**Korolevu na Turaga na Vunivalu**; Ratu Tevita Mara Latianara; Vunibau, (Note: Formerly part of Deuba Sub-District, Serua District, Serua Province.) Serua, Navutulevu, Namaqumaqua, Korovisilou, Yanuca, Culanuku (Culanuka); Talanaua
Serua	Serua	**Burenitu na Railevu**; Nabukelevu, (Note: Formerly part of original Serua Sub-District, Serua District, Serua Province.) Nabotini, Nakorovou, (Note: Formerly part of Batiwai Sub-District, Nuku District, Serua Province.) Vunaniu, Navilivatu
Serua	Deuba	**Dravuni na Turaga Tui Dravuni**; Sadro, Nasavu, Saniveiuto
Nuku	Nuku	**Sayake na Turaga na Tanisayake**; Nuku, Waibogi, Wainadiro, Masi, Naimasimasi, Sabata
Nuku	Batiwai	**Vusu na Turaga na Tani Vusu**; Ratu Epeli Naliva; Galoa, Dranikula, Wainiyabia, Qarasarau; Sigasiganilaca, Lepanoni

=== Tailevu ===
**Tikina Cokavata**
**(District)**
**Tikina Vou**
**(Sub-District)**
**Ai Cavuti (Chiefly Title)**
Ratu (Chief; named only if known)
Koro (Villages)
Bau
Bau
**Kubuna na Turaga Bale na Tui Kaba na Vunivalu**
Vacant
Bau, Soso, Lasakau, Namuka, Nakoroivau, Natila, Cautata, Dromuna, Ovea, Vatani, Vatoa, Waicoka
**Natena na Roko Tui Kiuva**
Kiuva, Muanaira, Naqeledamu, Logani, Natila
Viwa
**Nayaumunu vua na Turaga na Roko Tui Viwa**

Viwa (Note: Formerly part of Bau Village Group, Bau Sub-District, Bau District, Tailevu Province.)

Namara
**Turaga na Roko Tui Veikau**
Naisausau, Nakorolevu, Matamaivere, Tubalevu, Naikawaga, Nakalawaca
Nausori
**Na Turaga na Ratu**
Ratu Peni Rokotuibau
Nausori, Vunimono, Nadali, Verata-Wailevu, Naduru, Molituva, Namono
Dravo
**Navitomi na Turaga na Tudrau**
Dravo, Naisogovau, Naila, Mokani, Maumi
Namata
**Nacobua na Turaga na Roko Tui Namata**
Ratu Peni Tagive
Raralevu, Namata
Nakelo
Nakelo
**Rara o Nakelo na Turaga na Tui Nakelo**
Nauluvatu, Namuka-Vakali, Visama, Tumavia, Muana, Naluna, Vutuvo, Waikete, Naimalovau, Vaturua, Nasilai, Nakaulevu, Anitioki, Kelili, Nukulau, Vunivaivai, Vadrai
Nuku
**Turaga na Tui Nabou**
Ratu Semi Matalau
Natogadravu, Naselai, Natoveya
Tokatoka
**Naceruku na Turaga na Tora Dreketi**
Ratu Apenisa Tagivetaua
Nabitu, Vuci, Draubuta, Lomainasau, Vanuadina, Nakaile, Vanualevu
Buretu
**Naibati na Turaga na Tora Naibati**
Ratu Nailovolovo
Buretu, Matainoco, Nabouciwa, Naivakacau, Daku
Verata
Verata
**Na Bure Levu o Naisanokonoko, Nodra na Gone Turaga Bale, O Koya na Ratu**
Vacant
Ucunivanua, Naivuruvuru, Navunimono, Naloto, Sawa, Kumi, Naigani, Uluiloli
Namalata
**Waimarolevulevu na Turaga na Ratu**
Matacaucau, Matacula, Nailega, Nakorovou, Veinuqa, Naitutu, Navunisole, Nakalawaca, Delasui, Nayawasara, Davetalevu
Tai
**Turaga na Roko Tui Tai**
Dravuni, Naisaumua
Vugalei
**Vunisalevu na Turaga na Tui Vugalei**
Natobuniqio, Namulomulo, Nadaro, Sote, Visa, Savu, Naimasimasi, Naqeledamu, Logani, Naiborebore (Note: Formerly part of Tai Sub-District, Verata District, Tailevu Province.)
Taivugalei
**Burerua na Turaga na Vunivalu**
Natuva, Nameka, Vatukarasa, Tonia
Sawakasa
Sawakasa
**Nadereivalu na Turaga na Ratu**
Sawakasa I, Sawakasa II, Burerua, Dakuinuku, Lodoni, Vorovoro
Namena
**Nawainovo na Tui Wainovo**
Nburenivalu, Nananu, Bureevu, Lawaki, Qoma, Qelekuro, Nabualau, Delaikuku, Nadrano
Dawasamu
**Dawasamu na Turaga na Ratu**
Driti, Delakado, Luvunavuaka, Nataleira, Silana, Nasinu, Nabualau, Delasui, Natadrave
Wainibuka
Naloto
**Naloto na Turaga na Tui Naloto**
Naivicula, Naveicovatu, Nasau
Wailotua
**Wailevu na Turaga na Tui Wailevu**
Wailotua II, Nalabe, Natokalau, Wailotua I
Nasautoka
**Turaga Sau na Vunivalu**
Ratu Semi Seruvakula
Nasautoka, Nabouva; Yavusa Nasautoka-Dakuivuna, Yavusa Nasautoka-Wailotua
Nayavu
**Bau na Roko Tui Bau**
Nayavu, Naqia, Naseibitu, Namoka, Naveiveiwali, Natuvatuvavatu
Nailega
**Naduadua na Turaga na Vunivalu**
Naibita, Nailega, Wailevu, Nabulini, Manu

== See also ==
- Malvatu Mauri (House of Chiefs) of Vanuatu
