= Koila Nailatikau =

Fijian lawyer, diplomat, politician, and former First Lady of Fiji

The Honourable Her Excellency Adi Koila Mara Nailatikau
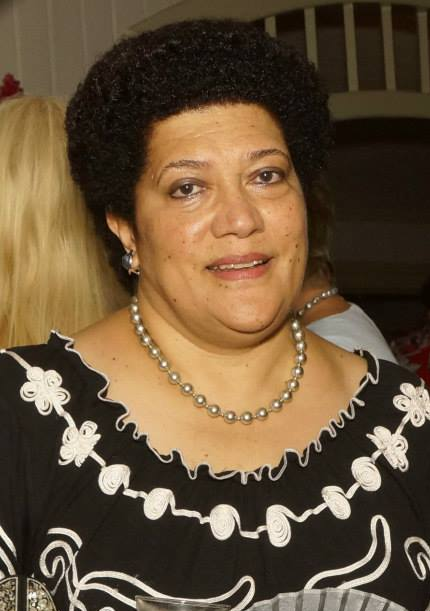
- Koila in 2014

First Lady of Fiji
- In office 30 July 2009 – 12 November 2015
- President: Epeli Nailatikau
- Prime Minister: Frank Bainimarama
- Preceded by: Kavu Iloilo
- Succeeded by: Sarote Faga Konrote

Senator of Fiji
- In office 2001–2006
- Appointed by: President of Fiji On; Advise by the Great Council of Chiefs
- President: Ratu Josefa Iloilo
- Prime Minister: Laisenia Qarase

Member of the Fiji House of Representatives For Lau
- In office 19 May 1999 – 27 May 2000
- President: Kamisese Mara
- Prime Minister: Mahendra Chaudry
- Preceded by: Finau Mara
- Succeeded by: Laisenia Qarase

Personal details
- Born: 1953 (age 72–73)
- Party: Christian Democratic Alliance (Fiji) (1990-2000); National Alliance Party of Fiji (2005-2006); Independent (Currently)
- Spouse: Ratu Epeli Nailatikau
- Children: Kamisese Nailatikau; Litia Nailatikau
- Parent(s): Ratu Sir Kamisese Mara (Father); Ro Lady Lala Mara (Mother)
- Education: University of Oxford (Foreign Service Program), London School of Economics (LLB)

Adi Arieta Koila Josephine Mara Nailatikau is a member and daughter of one of Fiji's Chiefly Families the Paramount Rulers of the Lauan Islands The Vuanirewa Clan and a Fijian lawyer, who has served as a diplomat and politician. She was also First Lady of Fiji from 2009 until 2015, as the wife of Ratu Epeli Nailatikau, the President of Fiji.

== Family background ==
Arieta Koila Josephine Mara was born in 1953. Her father, Ratu Sir Kamisese Mara (1920–2004), was Tui Nayau (Paramount Chief of the Lau Islands) and served as Fiji's first Prime Minister (1967–1992, apart from a very brief interruption in 1987) and later as President (1993–2000), and was regarded as modern Fiji's founding father. Her mother, Ro Lady Lala Mara (1931–2004), held the title of Roko Tui Dreketi, or Paramount Chief of the Burebasaga Confederacy. In 1979, during her time as student at Somerville College, Adi Koila graduated from the Oxford University Foreign Service Programme.

In 1981, Adi Koila married Ratu Epeli Nailatikau. The scion of another chiefly family, Ratu Epeli (born 1941) was appointed President of Fiji by the Military-backed regime in 2009 after a distinguished career, serving variously as Commander of the Royal Fiji Military Forces in the 1980s, High Commissioner (equivalent to an ambassador in Commonwealth countries) to the United Kingdom in the 1990s, Deputy Prime Minister in 2000 and 2001, and finally as Speaker of the House of Representatives from 2001 to 2006; The Fijian Parliament is one of the few legislative bodies in the world in which a husband and wife have had simultaneous parliamentary careers.

Adi Koila and Ratu Epeli have two children: a son, Kamisese (named after Adi Koila's father), and a daughter, Litia.

== Career ==
After a serving as a diplomat in the 1980s and 1990s, Adi Koila was elected to the House of Representatives in 1999 as a candidate of the Christian Democratic Alliance, representing the Lau Fijian communal constituency, which had earlier been held by both her father and her brother, Ratu Finau Mara. In the coalition Cabinet that was subsequently appointed, Adi Koila became Minister of Tourism.

Adi Koila's cabinet career was brought to a sudden end on 19 May 2000, when George Speight, an extreme Fijian nationalist who objected to the presence of Indo-Fijians in the government, seized power, kidnapping Prime Minister Mahendra Chaudhry and most of the Cabinet, including Adi Koila, and forcing her father to resign as president. Along with her fellow hostages, Adi Koila was held captive for 56 days, although she was briefly released on 1 June to attend a funeral, on condition that she immediately rejoin the other captives. A period of political turbulence followed the coup. Democracy was restored in 2001, and Adi Koila was chosen by the Lau Provincial Council, on behalf of the Great Council of Chiefs, to fill one of fourteen Senate seats reserved for Fijian chiefly representatives. She played an active role as chairperson of the Senate Privileges Committee, and as a member of the Senate Foreign Relations Committee.

In politics, Nailatikau took a strong stand against proposals to legalise prostitution. In a Senate debate on 30 May 2003, she warned called for a tough stand against sex tourism, saying that it was a form of sexual exploitation and that it led to increasing incidents of child molestation and paedophilia. "While we advertise tourism, we should also educate our people in keeping a close vigil on what is happening as the side effect of tourism," she said. Nailatikau called for "maximum sentences" for those facilitating such offences. Lamenting the downgrading of the marriage commitment, parental authority, and relationships between grandparents and grandchildren, she blamed the breakdown of family values for the increasing crime rate.

On 7 December 2005, Nailatikau called for the establishment of a "national youth service," under the auspices of the Military, to help reduce unemployment. Young people would learn self-discipline and would be trained for careers, such as engineering, that would enable them later to contribute to society through voluntary and paid employment, the Fiji Live news service quoted her as saying.

== Post-coup controversies ==
In the aftermath of the coup that deposed her father and the government in which she was a minister, Adi Koila was an outspoken critic of the Qarase government's handling of the prosecution of persons implicated in the rebellion, accusing it of showing lenience to its perpetrators and insensitivity to its victims. She also criticised what she sees as government efforts to foster national "reconciliation" without fundamentally addressing the wrongs that were committed.

=== Fiji Week (2004) ===
On 25 September 2004, Adi Koila rejected the efforts of Speight and his accomplices Ratu Timoci Silatolu and Josefa Nata to offer an apology to the parliamentarians they had held hostage in the 2000 coup. Following a supposed "religious conversion" experience, Speight announced in mid-2004 that he had had a change of heart about the coup and the reasons for it. Saying that she was still grieving for her parents, who died within three months of each other in 2004, Adi Koila said it was too soon for her to consider any apology from the perpetrators of the coup which deposed her father. "I feel that the rule of law must be upheld," she said. "I simply will not accept any apology until justice is done." Adi Koila added that her refusal to accept any political attempts at reconciliation was motivated by her belief that the "culture of coups" must be discouraged.

In a speech from the floor of the Senate on 22 October 2004, Adi Koila explained refusal to participate in the Fiji Week reconciliation ceremonies, also known as Reconciliation Week, by quoting her late father's words spoken at the Lau Provincial Council in October 2000: "The reconciliation that has been undertaken today will be worthless if investigations into the coup do not reveal the truth behind the staging."

Adi Koila expressed anger that Simione Kaitani (whom she accused of making speeches against her father inside the parliamentary complex during the coup) and Ratu Naiqama Lalabalavu (whom she accused of having ordered the burning of a property owned by her father, the Matailakeba Cane Farm in Seaqaqa, on 29 July 2000) both now held Cabinet positions, and that former Prime Minister Sitiveni Rabuka and former Police Commissioner Isikia Savua, both of whom her late father had accused of involvement in the coup, now either occupied or had been nominated for senior diplomatic posts.

Adi Koila wondered aloud why the government had decided to organise the reconciliation ceremonies only after both of her parents had died. "Why was the concept of reconciliation never done for the late Turaga Bale the Tui Nayau (Ratu Mara) or for that matter the late Marama Bale the Roko Tui Dreketi (Ro Adi Lala Mara)?" she demanded. "Was all this conjured overnight immediately after their demise?" she questioned.

Adi Koila said she was baffled that in the reconciliation ceremonies, the apology was offered, not to the victims of the 2000 coup, but to President Iloilo and Prime Minister Qarase, who she said were the principal beneficiaries of the coup. "Because if it were not for the coup they would not be in those positions as the Turaga Bale the Tui Nayau would still be the President and Mr Chaudhry Prime Minister. "More so, if it were not for the coup my parents would still be alive today," she said. Ratu Mara's health had deteriorated following his overthrow, leading to his death in May 2004; Adi Lala had died three months later.

Clarifying her remarks of a further Senate speech on 29 October, Adi Koila reiterated that the reconciliation ceremony was inappropriate because the person who received the whale's tooth and forgave the people in the ceremony at Albert Park had not been a victim of the May 2000 coup.

Adi Koila repeated that there could be no genuine forgiveness until questions were answered about who was involved in organising and funding the 2000 coup. "An individual will forgive when he or she is ready. There must be truth telling, as to why they participated and who gave the orders," Adi Koila said. "Reconciliation cannot eventuate or materialise until the proper legal procedures have been followed, that is without interference from external forces."

Rejecting the criticism, the Prime Minister's spokesman Joji Kotobalavu retaliated by accusing Adi Koila's father, Ratu Mara, of having benefited from the 1987 coups. He went on to say that the Prime Minister had not benefited from the coup because he had quit a lucrative career in the private sector to "rescue a Fiji in turmoil." He did not address Adi Koila's charge that the present government is full of individuals who were involved in the 2000 coup. Simione Kaitani, one of those implicated, accused Adi Koila of "crying over spilt milk," and insisted that there was "no truth at all" in her accusations against him. He added only God knew why her parents died.

=== Reconciliation and Unity Commission ===
Prime Minister Laisenia Qarase announced on 4 May 2005 that a Reconciliation and Unity Commission would be set up, empowered to recommend amnesty to persons convicted of coup-related offence, provided that their motive had been "political" rather than "criminal," and to recommend compensation for "deserving" victims. On 7 May, Adi Koila joined Opposition Leader and former Prime Minister Mahendra Chaudhry, United Peoples Party leader Mick Beddoes, and National Alliance Party president Ratu Epeli Ganilau in opposing the commission and its purpose. She asserted that if her father were alive, he would have insisted on the rule of law, adding that there could be no reconciliation outside of the courts. Unless all of the perpetrators were put on trial, she said, "Fiji cannot put to rest the ghosts of the coup."

She renewed her attack on both the legislation and the government promoting it on 20 July, saying it appeared that the government was incapable of functioning without the perpetrators of the coup, and that the legislation was biased in favour of coup perpetrators rather than victims. "The Bill is slanted towards the perpetrators of the coup and not the victims ... This Bill is lenient towards the perpetrators while the victims get nothing," she said. She accused the government of neglecting what she saw as far more important issues, like squatters, unemployment, poverty, and road conditions, in favour of the Reconciliation, Tolerance, and Unity Bill.

In a further statement on behalf of the family on 24 July, she again condemned the bill, saying that it amounted to supporting the overthrow of her father. She said that her father had championed unity, tolerance, peaceful coexistence, and the rule of law, which this legislation undermined, going against everything he had believed in. "I recall what the late Tui Nayau said at his last Lau Provincial Council meeting on Ono, Lau, in October 2000: 'There can be no reconciliation or peace until the coup investigations are completed and the rule of law is upheld'," she said.

Nailatikau said that some government authorities, who she said were "hell-bent" on promoting the amnesty clauses of the legislation, were creating the impression that there was some connection between the coup perpetrators and themselves. She demanded to know what the connection was.

In the same statement, Nailatikau spoke highly of Military commander Frank Bainimarama (q.v.), a strident opponent of the legislation who threatened to depose the present government if the bill were to be passed. "The commander is doing a wonderful job because he is not only speaking in his personal capacity as Commander. He is speaking as the Commander of the Fiji battalion in Fiji and those serving overseas, and he has the support of the silent majority," she said.

Following the decision of the Lau Provincial Council on 25 July to endorse the bill, Nailatikau was too disappointed to speak the media.

== 2006 candidate? ==
It was reported on 15 June 2005 that Nailatikau was considering giving up her Senate seat to run for her old Lau Fijian Communal Constituency. She confirmed that the chiefly Vuanirewa clan, of which her late father was Paramount Chief, had asked her to stand as their candidate, but said that she would not make a final decision till August, when a one-year period of mourning for her late mother was due to end. She said she would consult her brothers before announcing any decision. Nailatikau did not indicate which political party, if any, she intended to join. Her former party, the Christian Democratic Alliance, was by now defunct, and she had relatives and in-laws in a number of different parties.

As the election, which was held on 6–13 May 2006 drew close, she indicated a wish to contest the Lami Open Constituency for the National Alliance Party (NAPF), led by her brother-in-law, Ratu Epeli Ganilau, but withdrew in favour of Ben Padarath, who had already been selected. Ratu Jioji Uluinakauvadra offered to withdraw his candidacy for the Nasinu Urban Fijian Communal Constituency in her favour, but she declined the offer, the Fiji Live news service reported on 8 April. She continued to campaign for the NAPF, however. Following the election, the Lau Provincial Council and the Great Council of Chiefs reappointed her to the Senate. There was speculation in July 2006 that she might resign to join her husband, who had been offered a diplomatic post, but that did not eventuate.

== Honours ==
National honours

- Order of the Crown of Tonga, Grand Cross (31 July 2008).
