= Lala Mara =

Former first lady of Fiji

Ro Lady Mara
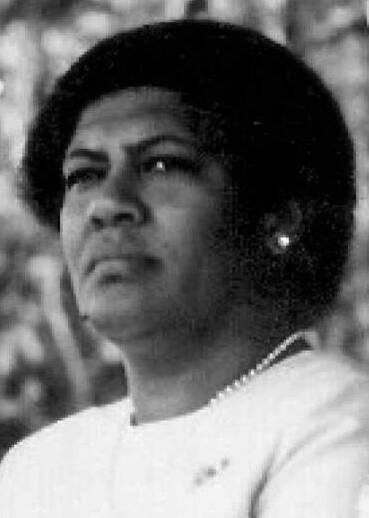

First Lady of Fiji
- In office December 16, 1993 – May 29, 2000
- Preceded by: Adi Lady Lala Ganilau
- Succeeded by: Kavu Iloilo

Personal details
- Born: January 4, 1931 Lomanikoro, Rewa Province, Fiji
- Died: July 20, 2004 (aged 73)
- Spouse: Ratu Kamisese Mara
- Parent(s): George Tuisawau, Adi Asenaca Vosailagi

Ro Lala, Lady Mara, maiden name Litia Cakobau Lalabalavu Katoafutoga Tuisawau (4 January 1931 – 20 July 2004) was a Fijian chief, who was better known as the widow of Ratu Sir Kamisese Mara, modern Fiji's founding father who served for many years as Prime Minister and President of his country. As Fiji's First Lady, Adi Lala took on a diplomatic role, frequently representing her country abroad. She was regarded as a formidable and astute woman, whose influence on her husband was said to be considerable.

== Family background ==
From her father George Tuisawau, she inherited the title of Roko Tui Dreketi, the traditional title of the rulers of the Burebasaga Confederacy, which covers the provinces of Rewa, Nadroga-Navosa, Namosi, Serua, Kadavu (off the southern coast of Viti Levu), and parts of Ba and Ra. Her mother, Adi Asenaca Vosailagi, was from the chiefly Ka Levu clan of Nadroga, where she was a chief in her own right. The village of Lomanikoro in Rewa Province is the capital of the confederacy. Adi Lala's marriage, on 11 September 1949, to Ratu Mara, who was to become the Tui Lau and Tui Nayau (the traditional ruler of the Lau Islands) was considered a dynastic marriage, as it united two powerful feudal families. Relations between the families had been strained in the past, so the marriage was opposed in certain quarters, especially on Ratu Mara's side. Nevertheless, the marriage was by all accounts a happy one and lasted 54 years until Ratu Mara's death on 18 April 2004. The duration of this marriage was in stark contrast to the prevalence of divorce in much of the Mara clan. Three sons and five daughters issued from their marriage, two of whom have pursued political careers of their own. Their eldest son, Ratu Finau Mara, served as a member of the House of Representatives and of the Cabinet throughout the 1990s, and led the Fijian Association Party from 1996 to 1998. Their second daughter, Adi Koila Mara Nailatikau, was elected to the House of Representatives in 1999 and was Minister of Tourism in 1999 and 2000. She was a Senator from 2001 to 2006 and later First Lady from 2009 to 2015, being married to the then-President, Ratu Epeli Nailatikau.

== Political career ==
In 1991, Adi Lala founded the Soqosoqo ni Vakavulewa ni Taukei (Soqosoqo ni Vakavulewa ni Taukei, or SVT) as the successor to the disbanded Alliance Party that her husband had founded and led, but for the leadership she was outmanoeuvred by Sitiveni Rabuka, who had led the Fiji coups of 1987. To the end of her life, Adi Lala remained active in the Great Council of Chiefs, where she was regarded as a voice of moderation.

On 12 November 2003, Radio New Zealand reported that Adi Lala had bitterly accused some chiefs, whom she did not name, of having been involved in the coup d'état which deposed her husband from the presidency in May 2000 and also toppled the elected government. Opening a meeting of the Great Council of Chiefs, she said that the perpetrators of the coup were "false prophets" motivated by greed, who were inciting racial strife and uncertainty with their threats, and that the coups had brought Fiji to its knees. She called on her fellow-chiefs to re-examine their roles, especially in regard to promoting racial harmony in a multicultural nation. She said some chiefs had also been involved in the earlier coups of 1987.

== Controversies following her death ==
Ro Lala's death, only three months after that of her husband, was announced in Suva on 20 July 2004. No immediate cause of death was given. Allegations were subsequently made in Parliament, however, that she had suffered a fatal heart attack after hearing the distressing news that her son-in-law, Ratu Epeli Ganilau, was to be dismissed as Chairman of the Great Council of Chiefs, which was "the last straw" after her husband's death three months earlier. Senator James Ah Koy claimed on the floor of the Senate to have received the information from sources close to Adi Lala's family, and charged the Qarase government with responsibility for her death because of its involvement in Ganilau's sacking. His comments drew a strong rebuke from the Chairman of the Kadavu Provincial Council, which Ah Koy represented in the Senate. Ratu Joe Nawalowalo called his speech "gutter material" which "belittled" the close relationship Adi Lala had enjoyed with the province.

== Statue proposed ==
Adi Lala was succeeded as Roko Tui Dreketi by her younger sister, Ro Teimumu Vuikaba Kepa, who also served as Minister for Education in the Qarase government from 2000 to 2006.

The women's organisation Soqosoqo Vakamarama i Taukei announced on 21 July 2005, the day after the first anniversary of Adi Lala's death, that it was setting up a foundation that would help build a statue of the late Adi Lala, who was the founder of the Soqosoqo Vakamarama and its president until her death.

The period of mourning for Adi Lala ended on 20–21 September 2005, with a ceremony at the chiefly village of Cuvu in Nadroga, where her mother was from. Attended by large delegations of chiefs and commoners from the Kubuna and Tovata as well as her own Burebasaga Confederacy, the ceremonies included the presentation of more than two container-loads of gifts including tabua (whales' teeth), masi (tapa cloth), canoes, mats, and lavish quantities of food, and culminated in a feast. Earlier, Ro Epeli Mataitini, the Younger brother of the official Vunivalu (a Chiefs Right Hand) for the Roko Tui Dreketi, had spoken of the love and respect that Fijians had for Adi Lala. While humans planned their future, he said, God always had the final say in people's lives, which was why it was so important to appreciate and maintain the links that bound Fiji's chiefly clans together. He called on younger Fijians to learn from the older chiefs who, despite political differences, cherished their links to the different tribes that make up the nation.

Preceded by George Tuisawau	Roko Tui Dreketi; 1961–2004	Succeeded by Ro Teimumu Vuikaba Kepa
