= Rewa (Fijian Communal Constituency, Fiji) =

Former electoral constituency in Fiji

Rewa Fijian Provincial Communal is a former electoral division of Fiji, one of 23 communal constituencies reserved for indigenous Fijians. Established by the 1997 Constitution, it came into being in 1999 and was used for the parliamentary elections of 1999, 2001, and 2006. (Of the remaining 48 seats, 23 were reserved for other ethnic communities and 25, called Open Constituencies, were elected by universal suffrage). The electorate was coextensive with Rewa Province.

The 2013 Constitution promulgated by the Military-backed interim government abolished all constituencies and established a form of proportional representation, with the entire country voting as a single electorate.

== Election results ==
In the following tables, the primary vote refers to first-preference votes cast. The final vote refers to the final tally after votes for low-polling candidates have been progressively redistributed to other candidates according to pre-arranged electoral agreements (see electoral fusion), which may be customized by the voters (see instant run-off voting).

In the 2001 and 2006 elections, Ro Teimumu Kepa won with more than 50 percent of the primary vote; therefore, there was no redistribution of preferences.

=== 1999 ===
Candidate	Political party	Votes (primary)	%	Votes (final)	%
Timoci Silatolu	Fijian Association Party (FAP)	1,063	20.47	3,100	59.70
Sakeasi Butadroka	Nationalist Vanua Tako Lavo Party (NVTLP)	2,029	39.07	2,093	40.30
Epeli Mataitini	Soqosoqo ni Vakavulewa ni Taukei (SVT)	1,256	24.19	...	...
Tevita Bukarau	Christian Democratic Alliance	845	16.27	...	...
Total		5,193	100.00	5,193	100.00

=== 2001 ===
Candidate	Political party	Votes	%
Ro Teimumu Kepa	Soqosoqo Duavata ni Lewenivanua (SDL)	2,636	51.35
Timoci Silatolu	Conservative Alliance (CAMV)	1,743	33.96
Miriama Rayawa Cama	Soqosoqo ni Vakavulewa ni Taukei (SVT)	536	10.44
Viliame Vulowai Raile	Independent	110	2.14
Watisoni Korodrau Butadroka	Nationalist Vanua Tako Lavo Party (NVTLP)	108	2.10
Total		5,133	100.00

=== 2006 ===
Candidate	Political party	Votes	%
Ro Teimumu Kepa	Soqosoqo Duavata ni Lewenivanua (SDL)	3,401	56.36
Ro Filipe Tuisawau	Independent	2,371	39.29
Taniela Robonu Senikuta	Fiji Labour Party (FLP)	167	2.77
Viliame Vulowai Raile	Independent	95	1.57
Total		6,034	100.00

== Sources ==
- Psephos - Adam Carr's electoral archive
- Fiji Facts
