= Serukeirewa =

Elenoa Serukeirewa (1875–1930) was a Fijian Adi.

== Biography ==
She was the daughter of Ro Waisea. L. Qioniwailevu and Adi Veniana Draukibei. Ro Waisea was the "Vunivalu na Vosaibaleni" of the Yavusa Nawainovo from the tokatoka Nauluvatu. Adi Elenoa was the last member of this lineage. Before she died in 1930, she held the title "Vunivalu na Vosaibaleni", inheriting it from her father. She was also the last person to have been installed to this position. Her village was Kasavu, now located in the province and district of Naitasiri. Formerly, this village consisted of three tribes, including the Yavusa Nawainovo, where the "Marama na Vunivalu" is from, and which comprises the Mataqali Vunivesi. The other two tribes were the Yavusa Sawa, consisting of the Mataqali Rokoraite, and the Yavusa Burenitu, consisting of the Mataqali Aisokula, Rokotuinakoro, Vunileba, Tabuicovi and Naisogo. However, after the sitting of the Native Lands Commission the three tribes were combined into one known as the Burenitu tribe.

Adi Elenoa married the "Gone Toga" of Rewa, Senitiki Tupou, who was the first Fijian magistrate. They met while the Gone Toga was posted to Naduruloulou, in Kasavu. The Gone Toga was from the Mataqali Vusamatai of the Yavusa Nailarube.He is the son of Ratu Manoa Nagatalevu, the Turaga na Gone Toga and Adi Ana Lelea. He died while serving his judicial duties in Vunidawa and was laid to rest at Namotobau, Seatura, in the District of Rara, Naitasiri.

The title of the "Marama na Vosaibaleni" originated from Ucunivanua in Verata. The title was said to be the twin title of the "Ratu mai Verata". The Vosaibaleni is name of the twin brother of the Ratu, who, according to Fijian tradition, took the form of a snake upon birth, hence the title Vunivalu na Vosaibaleni. Since her death in 1930, no-one has been installed into the position, even though the "Turaga ni Yavusa Burenitu" now performs the function of this title. The main reason why the position has been vacant ever since her death was because Adi Elenoa was born into a family of one. She did not have any other siblings and that all her children were registered in the Vola ni Kawabula of Nailarube. The structure of her village changed much after the sitting of the Native Lands Commission.
