= Tuisawau =

Tuisawau is a surname. Notable people with the surname include:

- Filipe Tuisawau, Fijian chief
- George Tuisawau (1901–1961), Fijian chief
