= George Tuisawau =

Fijian chief and politician

Roko Tui of Rewa
- In office 1936–1961
- Preceded by: Joni Mataitini
- Succeeded by: Ro Lady Lala Mara

Nominated Member of the Legislative Council
- In office 1937–

Member of the Executive Council
- In office 1946, 1948, 1953

Personal details
- Born: 18 August 1901 Rewa, Fiji
- Died: 14 September 1961 (age 60) Suva, Fiji
- Children: Ro Lady Lala Mara; Ro Teimumu Kepa

Ratu George Cokanauto Tuisawau OBE (18 August 1901 – 14 September 1961) was a Fijian chief and politician. He was Roko Tui of Rewa from 1936 until 1961, and spent two decades as a member of the Legislative Council.

== Biography ==
Tuisawau was on 18 August 1901 in Rewa to Lutunauga Bativuaka Tuisawau and Adi Teimumu Vuikaba. He was educated at the Queen Victoria School. In 1921 he started working as a clerk and interpreter, before being moving to Levuka in 1925. In 1926 he married Asenaca, with whom he had two daughters, He later married Flora Black, with whom he had a son, and Miliakere Lewavaro, with whom he had another daughter. In 1928 he moved to Ba, and later in the year started working for the Secretariat for Fijian Affairs.

Tuisawau was appointed Roko Tui of Rewa in 1936, succeeding Joni Mataitini, who had died two years previously. He also became Roko Tui Dreketi, succeeding his father. In 1936 he was nominated by the Great Council of Chiefs as a potential member of the Legislative Council, and was selected by the Governor to join the council, going on to spend two decades in the body.

During World War II, he commanded the First Docks Company of the Fiji Labour Corps, serving in the Solomon Islands. He also served in the Executive Council during 1946, 1948 and 1953. He was made an OBE in the 1951 New Year Honours.

Tuisawau died on 14 September 1961 at the age of 60. His daughter Lala succeeded him as Roko Tui of Rewa.
