= Joni Mataitini =

Fijian chief, civil servant and politician

Roko Tui of Rewa
- Succeeded by: George Tuisawau

Nominated Member of the Legislative Council
- In office 1924–1931

Personal details
- Born: 13 April 1865
- Died: 13 June 1934 (aged 69) Rewa, Fiji
- Profession: Civil servant

Ratu Joni Cure Mataitini (13 April 1865 – 13 June 1934) was a Fijian chief, civil servant and politician.

== Biography ==
Mataitini was born into a family of chiefs, and was educated by Joseph Waterhouse. He began working in the civil service in 1890, initially as a clerk to the Chief Medical Officer, before becoming an Inspector of Police in 1898. In 1904 he succeeded to the title of Roko Tui of Rewa. He returned to working in the medical service in 1913.

On 2 June 1924 Mataitini was appointed a nominated member of the Legislative Council. Later in the year he became Assistant to the Native Lands Commissioner. In 1926 he joined the Great Council of Chiefs.

Mataitini retired from his posts in August 1931. He died on 13 June 1934.
