= Kavaia Tagivetaua =

Fijian rugby union player

- Born: 5 June 2003 (age 23) Lomanikoro, Bau, Fiji
- Height: 180 cm (5 ft 11 in)
- Weight: 113 kg (249 lb; 17 st 11 lb)
- School: Marist Brothers High School

Rugby union career
- Position: Hooker
- Current team: Drua
Senior career
Years	Team	Apps	(Points)
2026–	Drua		
- Correct as of 23 November 2025
International career
Years	Team	Apps	(Points)
2022–2023	Fiji U20	4	(10)
2025–	Fiji	1	(0)
- Correct as of 23 November 2025

Kavaia Tagivetaua (born 5 June 2003) is a Fijian rugby union player, who plays for the Drua. His preferred position is hooker.

== Early career ==
Tagivetaua is from Lomanikoro and attended Marist Brothers High School where he played rugby. He plays his Skipper Cup rugby for Naitasiri. In 2022 and 2023, he was named in the Fiji U20 side, captaining the side in 2023.

== Professional career ==
Tagivetaua had been a member of the Drua development side in 2025, before being promoted to the full squad for the 2026 Super Rugby Pacific season. In November 2025, he made his debut for the Fiji national side, debuting as a replacement against Spain.
