= Timoci Silatolu =

Fijian politician

Timoci Qiolevu Silatolu, sometimes known by his chiefly title of Ratu, is a former Fijian politician. A telecommunications engineer by profession, he originates from the Chiefly village of Lomanikoro in the province of Rewa. He is married to Salome Silatolu, a school teacher. They have four children.

== Political career ==
As a candidate of the Fijian Association Party, Silatolu was elected to represent the Rewa Fijian Communal Constituency in the House of Representatives in the general election of 1999. Although his party formed part of the People's Coalition government that was subsequently formed, Silatolu was not appointed to the Cabinet.

Silatolu was appointed Assistant Minister of Health in the interim government organized by Laisenia Qarase in July 2000. He contested the general election held to restore democracy in September 2001 as a candidate of the Conservative Alliance, comprising mostly Speight-sympathizers, but lost his seat to his cousin, Ro Teimumu Kepa of the Soqosoqo Duavata ni Lewenivanua.

== Support for Unity Bill ==
Silatolu said that he supported the Reconciliation, Tolerance, and Unity Bill, a controversial piece of legislation promoted by Prime Minister Laisenia Qarase and Attorney-General Qoriniasi Bale. The legislation would have established a Commission empowered to compensate victims and pardon perpetrators of coup-related offenses.

== Coup ==
Silatolu was convicted of involvement in the 2000 Fijian coup d'état and was sentenced to imprisonment. At one time he was facing a death sentence. As of 2015, Silatolu is still serving his sentence.
