= Sairusi =

Sairusi is a Fijian surname. Notable people with the surname include:

- Sairusi Nagagavoka (1920–2014), Fijian politician
- Sairusi Naituku (1961–2016), Fijian rugby player
- Sairusi Nalaubu (born 1996), Fijian footballer
