= Roko Tui =

Roko Tui is the title for the executive head of any one of Fiji’s 14 Provincial Councils. Each province, called a "yasana", is administrated by a provincial council, which itself is subject to the Fijian Affairs Board, variously considered the “guardian” of the traditional Fijian administration system, amongst many other aspects of modern Fijian culture. The name Roko Tui is derived from what was traditionally used as a title (in some regions) denoting the Paramount Chief (like the title Roko Tui Dreketi), and so more often than not the modern role of Roko Tui is given to the Paramount Chief of the regions most chiefly clan.

== Present Roko Tui ==
The fourteen provinces and the present Roko Tui are:

Order	Province	Office bearer
1.	Ba	Jese Volau
2.	Bua	Rupeni Kunaturaga
3.	Caukadrove	Filimoni Naiqumu
4.	Kadavu	Eroni Vunisa
5.	Lau	Jioji Tupou Kalounivalu
6.	Lomaiviti	Penijamini Tokaduadua
7.	Macuata	Sitiveni Lalibuli
8.	Nadroga-Navosa	Viliame Seuseu Burenivalu
9.	Naitasiri	Ifereimi Corerega
10.	Namosi	Waisake Tuisese
11.	Ra	Mosese Nakoroi
12.	Rewa	Teimumu Vuikaba Kepa
13.	Serua	Amalaini Kanasalusalu
14.	Tailevu	Iliesa Delasau
