= Namosi (Fijian Communal Constituency, Fiji) =

Former electoral constituency in Fiji

Namosi Fijian Provincial Communal is a former electoral division of Fiji, one of 23 communal constituencies reserved for indigenous Fijians. Established by the 1997 Constitution, it came into being in 1999 and was used for the parliamentary elections of 1999, 2001, and 2006. (Of the remaining 48 seats, 23 were reserved for other ethnic communities and 25, called Open Constituencies, were elected by universal suffrage). The electorate was coextensive with Namosi Province.

The 2013 Constitution promulgated by the Military-backed interim government abolished all constituencies and established a form of proportional representation, with the entire country voting as a single electorate.

== Election results ==
In the following tables, the primary vote refers to first-preference votes cast. The final vote refers to the final tally after votes for low-polling candidates have been progressively redistributed to other candidates according to pre-arranged electoral agreements (see electoral fusion), which may be customized by the voters (see instant run-off voting).

In the 2001 and 2006 elections, Ratu Suliano Matanitobua won with more than 50 percent of the primary vote; therefore, there was no redistribution of preferences.

=== 1999 ===
Candidate	Political party	Votes (primary)	%	Votes (final)	%
Atonio Tanaburenisau	Fijian Association Party	970	41.92	1,309	56.57
Ratu Kiniviliame Taukeinikoro	Soqosoqo ni Vakavulewa ni Taukei (SVT)	990	42.78	1,005	43.43
Etuate Maria Vunitabua	Nationalist Vanua Tako Lavo Party (NVTLP)	206	8.90	...	...
Aselemo Vakadranu	Christian Democratic Alliance	206	6.40	...	...
Total		2,314	100.00	2,314	100.00

=== 2001 ===
Candidate	Political party	Votes	%
Ratu Suliano Matanitobua	Soqosoqo Duavata ni Lewenivanua (SDL)	1,901	85.48
Jope Duilomaloma Buaserau	Conservative Alliance (CAMV)	268	12.05
Koleta Marama Sivivatu	Fiji Labour Party (FLP)	30	1.35
Soani Nakuna	Nationalist Vanua Tako Lavo Party (NVTLP)	25	1.12
Total		2,224	100.00

=== 2006 ===
Candidate	Political party	Votes	%
Ratu Suliano Matanitobua	Soqosoqo Duavata ni Lewenivanua (SDL)	2,481	89.12
Waisea Batilekaleka	Nationalist Vanua Tako Lavo Party (NVTLP)	178	6.39
Koleta Marama Sivivatu	Fiji Labour Party (FLP)	125	4.49
Total		2,784	100.00

== Sources ==
- Psephos - Adam Carr's electoral archive
- Fiji Facts
