= Apakuki Nanovo =

Fijian chief and politician

Member of the Senate
- In office 1970–1977

Personal details
- Died: 1977 (aged 73)

Ratu Apakuki Tuisue Nanovo OBE (died 1977) was a Fijian chief and politician. He served as a member of the Senate between 1970 and 1977.

== Biography ==
Originally from Kadavu, Nanovo worked as a civil servant. He became a member of the Great Council of Chiefs in 1938.

During World War II Nanovo served in Bougainville and Solomon Islands campaigns as part of the Fiji Docks Company. He later served as Roko Tui of Kadavu. He retired from the civil service in 1960, but rejoined in 1965, serving until 1970.

In 1970 he was one of the nominees to the new Senate by the Great Council of Chiefs. He was appointed an OBE in the 1975 New Year Honours and served in the upper house until his death in 1977. His son Sela later also served in the Senate.
