= Kavu Iloilo =

First Lady of Fiji (1952–2020)

Kavu iloilo

First lady of Fiji
- In office 4 January 2007 – 30 July 2009
- President: Josefa Iloilo
- Preceded by: Maria Makitalena (acting)
- Succeeded by: Adi Koila Mara
- In office 13 July 2000 – 5 December 2006
- President: Josefa Iloilo
- Preceded by: Lala Mara
- Succeeded by: Maria Makitalena (acting)

Personal details
- Born: Salaseini Kavunono Uluivuda; 1952; Somosomo, Taveuni
- Died: July 20, 2020 (aged 67–68); Fiji
- Spouse: Josefa Iloilo (m. 1970; .died 2011)

Adi Salaseini Kavunono Uluivuda Iloilo (1952 – 20 July 2020), popularly known as Adi Kavu, was the First Lady of Fiji. She was the fourth wife of the Josefa Iloilo, who was Fiji's President from 2000 to 2009.

== Personal life ==
Kavunono was born in 1952 and hailed from the chiefly village of Somosomo on the island of Taveuni.

In September 2005, it was reported that Kavunono nabbed an intruder after discovering him in a room of her official residence. Her husband predeceased her in 2011. Kavunono Iloilo died in July 2020 at the age of 68.
