= Filipe Tuisawau =

Prime Minister of Fiji since 2025

The Honourable Ro Filipe Tuisawau MP
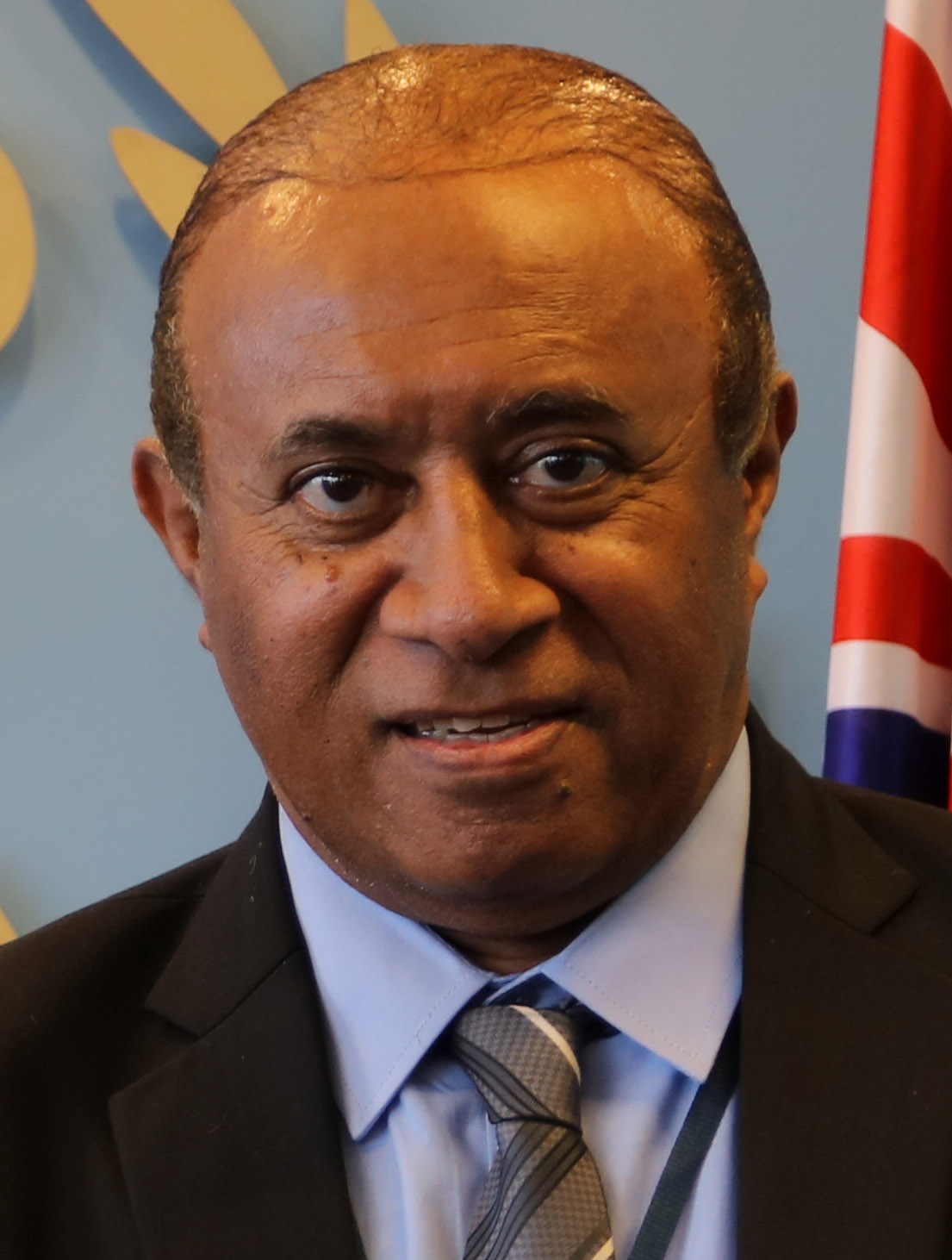
- Filipe Tuisawau in 2024

Acting Prime Minister of Fiji
- Incumbent
- Assumed office 17 June 2025
- Prime Minister: Sitiveni Rabuka

Minister for Communications
- Incumbent
- Assumed office 24 December 2022
- Prime Minister: Sitiveni Rabuka
- Preceded by: Aiyaz Sayed-Khaiyum

Minister for Public Works
- Incumbent
- Assumed office 24 December 2022

Minister for Transport
- Incumbent
- Assumed office 24 December 2022
- Preceded by: Faiyaz Koya

Member of the Fijian Parliament for PA List
- Incumbent
- Assumed office 14 December 2022

Member of the Fijian Parliament for SODELPA List
- In office 14 November 2018 – 14 December 2022

Personal details
- Party: Social Democratic Liberal Party; People's Alliance

Ro Filipe Qaraniqio Tuisawau is a Fijian chief, politician, and Cabinet Minister. He is a member of the People's Alliance. He is the son of former National Federation Party MP Ratu Mosese Tuisawau and the nephew of former SODELPA leader Ro Teimumu Kepa.

Before entering politics Tuisawu was president of the Fiji Rugby Union and also worked for the South Pacific Tourism Organisation.

Tuisawu unsuccessfully contested the Soqosoqo Duavata ni Lewenivanua nomination for Fijian communal seat of Rewa in the 2006 Fijian general election. When his aunt Ro Teimumu Kepa was selected instead, he contested the seat as an independent, but lost to her. Following the 2006 Fijian coup d'état he opposed the military regime's proposal for a non-iTaukei president.

He was elected to the Parliament of Fiji as a SODELPA candidate in the 2018 election, and made his first speech in parliament on 30 November 2018. In February 2019 he made homophobic tweets about new Zealand MP Tāmati Coffey, and said that there would be no same-sex marriage in Fiji. In January 2020 he made further homophobic comments, opposing an LGBTQ fashion show.

In June 2019 he was elected president of SODELPA. In April 2020 the High Court of Fiji ruled that his election breach the party's and the country's constitution, sparking a period of bitter infighting in the party and culminating in the suspension of the party from parliament. The split continued after the suspension was lifted, with Tuisawu backing party leader Sitiveni Rabuka.

In July 2021 he was detained by police along with other opposition MPs in a government attempt to stifle dissent over its proposed land bill.

In September 2021 following the announcement of the People's Alliance he was one of four SODELPA MPs expected to join Rabuka's new party. Tuisawa said he would remain a SODELPA MP until the end of the parliamentary term, and make up his mind then. In April 2022 he withdrew his nomination as a SODELPA candidate, saying that it had been made without his knowledge. In November 2022 once parliament had been dissolved for the 2022 election he resigned from SODELPA, attributing his departure to the party split. He subsequently joined the People's Alliance, and contested the election as a PA candidate. During the election campaign, he criticised SODELPA for allowing former military officers involved in the 2006 coup into the party, and accused them of orchestrating the prosecution and imprisonment of SODELPA MP Niko Nawaikula. He was elected with 2041 votes. On 24 December 2022 he was appointed Minister for Public Works, Communications, Transport and Meteorological Services in the coalition government of Sitiveni Rabuka. His first task as Minister was to re-establish the Department of Public Works, which had been split up in 2008.
