= Teimumu Kepa =

Fijian politician (born 1945)

The Honourable Teimumu Kepa CF MP
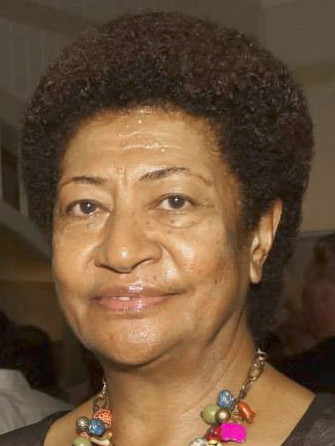
- Teimumu Kepa in 2014

Leader of the Opposition
- In office 6 October 2014 – 20 November 2018
- Prime Minister: Frank Bainimarama
- Preceded by: Mick Beddoes
- Succeeded by: Sitiveni Rabuka

Member of the Parliament of Fiji
- In office 17 September 2014 – 14 December 2022
- In office September 2001 – 4 December 2006
- Prime Minister: Laisenia Qarase
- Preceded by: Ratu Timoci Silatolu
- Succeeded by: (Overthrown); 2006 Fijian coup d'état
Ministerial positions
Deputy Prime Minister
In office 2001–2006
Prime Minister	Laisenia Qarase
Minister of Education
In office March 18, 2001 – December 4, 2006
Prime Minister	Laisenia Qarase
Preceded by	Nelson Delailomaloma
Succeeded by	Netani Sukanaivalu
Minister for Women, Culture, and Social Welfare
In office July 28, 2000 – 2001
Prime Minister	Laisenia Qarase
Preceded by	Adi Asenaca Caucau

Leader of SODELPA
- In office 26 June 2016 – March 2014
- Preceded by: Tupeni Baba
- Succeeded by: Sitiveni Rabuka

Fijian Senator
- In office 1999–2001
- Nominated by: Great Council of Chiefs

Personal details
- Born: 18 December 1945 (age 80) Lomanikoro, Colony of Fiji
- Party: Social Democratic Liberal (SODELPA)
- Other political affiliations: SDL (2001 – 2013)
- Spouse: Sailosi Kepa(Died 2004)
- Relations: Ro Lady Lala Mara (sister); Sir Lala Sukuna (Uncle)
- Parent: Ratu George Tuisawau
- Education: St Joseph's Secondary School, Fiji; University of the South Pacific (BA)

Ro Teimumu Vuikaba Kepa (born 18 December 1945) is a Fijian chief, former Member of the Parliament of Fiji, and former leader of the Social Democratic Liberal Party. She was the first Fijian woman to serve as Leader of the Opposition. She previously held the position of Deputy Prime Minister in the Qarase-led Soqosoqo Duavata ni Lewenivanua (SDL) government from 2001 to 2006. As the paramount chief of the Burebasaga Confederacy, she holds the title Roko Tui Dreketi.

== Personal life ==
Kepa is originally from Lomanikoro, Rewa. She graduated from the University of the South Pacific with a Bachelor of Arts, and served as Principal of Corpus Christi College and then as a students' coordinator at the University of the South Pacific.

She succeeded her late sister, former Ro Lady Lala Mara, as Roko Tui Dreketi, or Paramount Chief of Burebasaga, in 2004. This is considered to be the highest title in the Burebasaga Confederacy, one of three "confederacies", or tribal networks, of Fijian chiefs.

Ro Teimumu Kepa is the widow of Sailosi Kepa, a former High Commissioner to London, Minister of Justice and Attorney General (1988–1992), who went on to become a High Court Judge, Ombudsman, and first chairman of Fiji's Human Rights Commission.

== Political career ==
In 1999 Kepa was appointed to the Senate. Following the 2000 Fijian coup d'état she was appointed Minister for Women, Culture, and Social Welfare in the interim government of Laisenia Qarase. She contested the 2001 election as a candidate for the Soqosoqo Duavata ni Lewenivanua in the Rewa communal constituency, winning it with 2,636 votes. Following the election she was appointed Minister for Education.

On 5 May 2005 she was elected as chairperson of the Rewa Provincial Council, a position previously held by her sister Ro Lady Lala Mara. This led to claims that she had forfeited her seat in Parliament, resulting in her resigning from the council in August 2005.

In October 2005, Kepa was elected to the executive board of UNESCO, to which the Fijian government had nominated her in late September.

Kepa stood again for Rewa in the 2006 election, defeating her nephew, Ro Filipe Tuisawau. She was reappointed Minister for Education, Youth and Sports in the multi-party cabinet. When the Qarase government was deposed by the 2006 Fijian coup d'état, Kepa joined a court case challenging the legality of the coup. She also used her position in the Great Council of Chiefs to oppose the coup, and was instrumental in the Council's 2007 rejection of Epeli Nailatikau nomination as Vice-President. As a result, the Council was suspended.

In May 2007, Kepa was threatened by the military over her opposition to the coup. However she continued to speak out against the regime and its People's Charter for Change, Peace and Progress. In July 2009 she was arrested and charged with breaching public emergency regulations and conspiracy to cause disorder after offering that her province would host the annual conference of the Methodist Church of Fiji and Rotuma, which the military regime had banned. The charges were later dropped. In 2011 the military regime suspended the Rewa Provincial Council in another effort to silence her.

In March 2014 Kepa was elected leader of the newly formed Social Democratic Liberal Party. She led the party into the 2014 election. The party won 15 of the 50 parliamentary seats; Kepa, who won 49,485 votes in her own name, was the second-highest ranked candidate behind Bainimarama. On 6 October 2014 Kepa was appointed Leader of the Opposition.

In June 2016, Kepa announced that she was standing down as leader of SODELPA. She was replaced by former Prime Minister Sitiveni Rabuka. She was re-elected in the 2018 elections, winning 6,036 votes, the second-highest of any female candidate.

== 2021 Fijian presidential election ==
On 22 October 2021, Kepa was nominated as the opposition SODELPA party's candidate for the position of president of Fiji in the presidential election. She was able to gain the support of 23 MPs, but was defeated by the government's candidate, Wiliame Katonivere, in the first round of voting. One opposition MP, Mosese Bulitavu of SODELPA, had also voted for Katonivere. Had she been elected, Kepa would have been the first woman to hold the presidency of Fiji.

Candidate	Nominator	Parliament	
Candidate	Nominator	Votes	%
Wiliame Katonivere	Prime Minister Frank Bainimarama	28	54.90%
Teimumu Kepa	Opposition Whip Lynda Tabuya	23	45.10%
Abstentions and uncast ballots		0	00.00%
Total		51	100.00%
Sources: The Fiji Times

== Life After Politics ==
As the Chief holding the title "Roko Tui Dreketi" Teimumu remains a Important Central figure in Fiji through its traditions and culture. Since she is the Paramount Chief of Rewa, its only appropriate she is a ex officio member of the Rewa Provincial Holdings Company Serving as a Honorary Director.

=== The Tertiary Scholarships & Loans Services (TSLS) ===
TSLS announced on October 14, 2023, 3 new appointments to its Board of Directors with Teimumu as the new Board Chair. On July 3, 2024 She signed a Memorandum of Understanding with the University of Newcastle on behalf of the TSLS that expanded Joint funding for Phd Programs. On 14 October 2025 She again signed a Memorandum of Understanding with the University of Otago on behalf TSLS, New Pathways were established for Fijians to pursue academic programs at the University.

Political offices
Preceded by Ro Lady Lala Mara	Roko Tui Dreketi; 2005–present	Incumbent
Preceded by Ro Lady Lala Mara	Chair of the Rewa Provincial Council; 2005	Succeeded by Pita Tagicakiverata; Acting
Preceded by Mick Beddoes	Leader of the Opposition; 2014–2018	Succeeded by Sitiveni Rabuka
Party political offices
Preceded by Tupeni Baba; Provisional	Leader of SODELPA; 2014–2016	Succeeded by Sitiveni Rabuka
