= Senimili Dyer =

Fijian politician

Adi Senimili Dyer is a former Fijian politician, who served as an Assistant Minister for Women and Culture in the Prime Minister's Office in the interim Cabinet formed by Laisenia Qarase in the wake of the Fiji coup of 2000. She held office until an elected government took power in September 2001.

A retired teacher, Adi Senimili was born in Macuata Province in northern Vanua Levu. She was actively involved in the Macuata Women's Association which looks after development issues for the women of Macuata. She died in 2013 and was buried in the chiefly burial grounds in Naduri Village, Macuata.
