= Kiniviliame Taukeinikoro =

Fijian Chief and former political leader

Ratu Kiniviliame Taukeinikoro is a Fijian Chief and former political leader. From 2001 to 2006, he represented the Province of Namosi in the Senate as one of fourteen nominees of the Great Council of Chiefs. He was a member of the Joint Sector Committee on Economic Services.

In the parliamentary election of 1999, he was an unsuccessful candidate of the Soqosoqo ni Vakavulewa ni Taukei (SVT) for the Namosi Fijian Communal Constituency in the House of Representatives.
