= Tui Sabeto =

The Momo Levu (Tui Sabeto) is the Sovereign of the Dominion of Betoraurau.

Na Momo Levu (translated: The Momo Levu) is the style of the Sovereign of Betoraurau.

Erenavula is official residence of the Sovereign in Koroyaca village, Sabeto. It is a 5-minute drive from the north of Nadi International Airport.

Na-Masimasi is the Sovereign's country residence. Located in Koroisau Mountain Park in Sabeto. Na-Masimasi has offered the Sovereign an opportunity for solitude and tranquility, as well as an ideal place to host their family.

The Dominion of Betoraurau covers occupied territories under native, freehold and state land tenure. While a large area is reserved native lands, Betoraurau is home to cultural heritage sites, and important land marks such as the Nadi International Airport, Tuvatu Gold Mine and Garden of the Sleeping Giant. Betoraurau lands encompasses villages, peri-urban and urban residential, agricultural and industrial subdivisions. There are five villages in Betoraurau namely, Koroyaca, Narokorokoyawa, Natalau, Naboutini and Korobebe.

The Five Villages remains the permanent settlements of the seven yavusa (tribe) namely Conua (the Momo Levu's tribe), Leiwavuwavu (the Bati Leka, Gonedau), Nasara, Waruta (the Mataisau), Ne (Narogokoso), Leweikoro, Leweidrasa.

== Current title holder ==
Momo Levu Rt. Viliame Mataitoga was crowned the Momo Levu on January 16th 2024 following the death of the late Momo Levu na Tui Sabeto Ratu Tevita Susu Mataitoga (elder brother of the incumbent Momo Levu), in August of 2022. Momo Levu Rt. Viliame and the late Momo Levu Rt. Tevita are sons of the late Momo Levu, Ratu Kaliova Mataitoga, a former Council Member of the Great Council of Chiefs. The appointment of the Momo Levu is carried out by the Mataqali Buasali, a clan within the Yavusa Conua.
