= Burebasaga =

Largest of the three confederacies of Fiji's House of Chiefs

Coordinates: 18°6′16″S 178°33′29″E

Burebasaga is the largest of the three confederacies that make up Fiji's House of Chiefs, to which some of the Fijian chiefs belong.

== Composition of Burebasaga ==
It consists of the provinces of Rewa Province, Nadroga, Serua, Kadavu off the coast of Suva, and parts of Ba and Namosi. Burebasaga covers the southern and western parts of the island of Viti Levu. The Western Division and the southern part of the Central Division belong to Burebasaga.

Lomanikoro, in Rewa Province, is the capital of this confederacy.

== Chiefly titles ==
The Roko Tui Dreketi is the Paramount Chief of the Burebasaga Confederacy. Unlike the Kubuna and Tovata confederacies, Burebasaga does not require its paramount chief to be a male. The present Roko Tui Dreketi is Ro Teimumu Vuikaba Kepa, who succeeded her late sister, Ro Lady Lala Mara, a former First Lady of Fiji, in 2004. Kepa was also Minister of Education in the Fijian Cabinet from 2000 to 2006.

Another prominent Burebasaga chief is the Tui Vuda. The most recent holder of this title was Ratu Josefa Iloilo, who was the President of Fiji from 2000 to 2009, apart from a 29-day hiatus (5 December 2006 to 4 January 2007) after he was deposed in a military coup. The military returned the presidency to Iloilo. Former Prime Minister Ratu Tevita Momoedonu is also a Burebasaga chief.
