= Laufitu Malani =

Fijian politician (1958–2017)

Adi Laufitu Malani (1958-2017) was a Fijian chief and politicians. She was a former medical assistant, a former director of UNIFEM (now UN Women) Pacific office and a political leader. She served as a Senator from June to December 2006, when the Senate was dissolved in the wake of the military coup of 5 December.

On 8 January 2007, however, she was appointed Minister for Social Welfare and Women in the interim Cabinet of Commodore Frank Bainimarama.

== Biography ==
Malani is the daughter of Ratu Meli Salabogi, Member of the Order of the British Empire- MBE, former Fiji Senator and paramount chief of the Nakorotubu district in the Province of Ra in the northern part of Viti Levu (elder brother of medical doctor Dr Ratu Wilisoni Tuiketei Malani, Order of the British Empire-OBE).

As the first Director of UNIFEM (UN WOMEN) Pacific, she was instrumental in designing gender awareness programmes with Government planners in the Pacific as well as political empowerment for women in the Pacific.

In 2014, she was approached by the then Party leader of the Opposition-SODELPA party, Ro Teimumu Kepa to be her political adviser (PA), a role that she was committed to until she died.

Accolades poured in about her leadership qualities when she had died. A Fiji Times article "A legacy to remember" by Tauga Vulaono described how she mortgaged her premium Rt Sukuna Road-property to pay off the Guest House of the Ra Provincial Women Association (Ra Soqosoqo Vakamarama) and repay the loan herself. The Ra Soqosoqo Vakamarama used to cater for Ra Provincial and related meetings from an open fire hence the project to build a guest house with solar power, a water tank and a kitchen.

She again mortgaged her premium Rt Sukuna Road property to secure a youth hostel at Reki Street in Suva to cater for students from Ra Province who were finding difficulties to secure a place to stay while studying at one of the tertiary institutions in Suva, i.e. the University of the South Pacific (USP), Fiji National University (FNU), etc.

Both properties have been transferred as assets of the Ra Province under the Uluda Holdings Limited portfolio.
