= Sairusi Nagagavoka =

Fijian politician (1920–2014)

Ratu Sairusi Nagagavoka (1920–2014) was a Fijian chief and political leader from Ba Province. He held the traditional title of Momo na Tui Ba (Tai Ko BULU) , commonly abbreviated to Tui Ba Bulu, and as such was one of two paramount chiefs in the Ba district of Ba Province. He was the President of the Party of National Unity (PANU), which he founded in 1998.

Nagagavoka was regarded as a champion of multiracialism and multiculturalism, a rarity in a country whose electoral faultline was split ethnically rather than ideologically. He considered himself a protégé of the late Ratu Sir Kamisese Mara, Fiji's longtime former Prime Minister and President, whom he described as "a great leader who was able to unite all races in Fiji." He made this comment at the campaign launch of the Fiji Labour Party, to which his own party was electorally allied, in Ba Town on 11 February 2006. Speaking first in Hindi and closing in Fijian, Nagagavoka said that the country could not afford divisions, and called on political parties to cooperate to build a strong nation.

In the wake of the military coup which deposed the Qarase government on 5 December 2006, Nagagavoka called on the people to accept the reality that the Republic of Fiji Military Forces now effectively controlled the country. He boycotted a Great Council of Chiefs meeting in the third week of December, and was quoted in the Fiji Sun (20 and 24 December) as saying that political arguments were a waste of time and would only lead to more divisions. Prior to the coup, the Fiji Sun had quoted him (1 December) as saying that before the 1987 coups and 2000 coup, Fiji had been on the way to becoming an advanced and prosperous nation, but that the coups had thwarted the country's progress.

Nagagavoka was married to Bulou Suguta Soweri. They had eight children, 31 grandchildren, and 14 great-grandchildren.
