= Sela Nanovo =

Fijian politician (1941–2003)

Ratu Sela Donumaitoga Nanovo (September 1941 – 8 June 2003) was a Fijian Senator from 2001, when he was named to the position by the Great Council of Chiefs on the proposal of the Kadavu Provincial Council, till his death in 2003 at the age of 62.

Following his education at Tavuki District School and Vunisea Provincial Methodist School, he worked from 1958 to 1959 as an engineer of the Kadavu Provincial boat, and subsequently from 1960 to 1965 as a fitter in the Water Supply. From 1970 to 1981, he served as an engineer in the Marine Department. He was also an official of the Kadavu Shipping Company and the Kadavu House Company.

Nanovo served as Assistant Roko Tui Kadavu from 1982 to 1988, when he succeeded Waqa Naivalurua as Roko Tui Kadavu. He was in this position when the Kadavu Provincial Council chose him as its Senator. (According to the 1997 Constitution, which was abrogated in 2009, 14 of the 32 Senators were chosen by the Great Council of Chiefs, but the Great Council normally delegated this prerogative to 14 Fiji's Provincial Councils, with each choosing one Senator).

Though he had four sisters, Nanovo was the only son of former Senator Apakuki Nanovo and Bulou Salaseini Lele. He was married to Adi Salote Naivalurua from Tavuki. They had three daughters and a son, and 21 grandchildren at the time of Nanovo's death. He had a reputation as a quiet and soft-spoken man.
