= Bulous =

Bulous بولص
- Village
- Location in Syria
- Coordinates: 34°59′11″N 36°33′20″E
- Country: Syria
- Governorate: Hama
- District: Hama
- Subdistrict: Hirbnafsah

Population (2004)
  - Total: 681
- Time zone: UTC+3 (AST)
- City Qrya Pcode: C3052

Bulous (Arabic: بولص) is a Syrian village located in the Hirbnafsah Subdistrict in Hama District. According to the Syria Central Bureau of Statistics (CBS), Bulous had a population of 681 in the 2004 census.
