= Mataisau =

Mataisau is a Fijian word relating to a clan in Fiji known as "born carpenters". A group gifted with carpentry skills especially in building things such as houses, boats, furniture, tools, etc. It has been passed on by their ancestors through generations. Most of them live in a village called Nukutubu, Rewa and Solotavui, Kadavu in the Fiji Islands. Some have moved to other parts of the country and abroad. They originated from Narauyaba, Nakauvadra hills in the Ra province, Fiji Islands.

== See also ==
- Culture of Fiji
