= Navatu - Cakaudrove =

Navatu is a sub district in Cakaudrove; one of 3 provinces situated in Vanua Levu, the second largest island in Fiji. The sub-district, or "tikina" as it is known in the iTaukei language, comprises nine villages mainly occupying the eastern peninsular of the Natewa Bay. While Copra has been the main source of income for villages in the Navatu tikina, kava or yaqona is also becoming a fast growing commodity for villages within the Navatu sub-district.

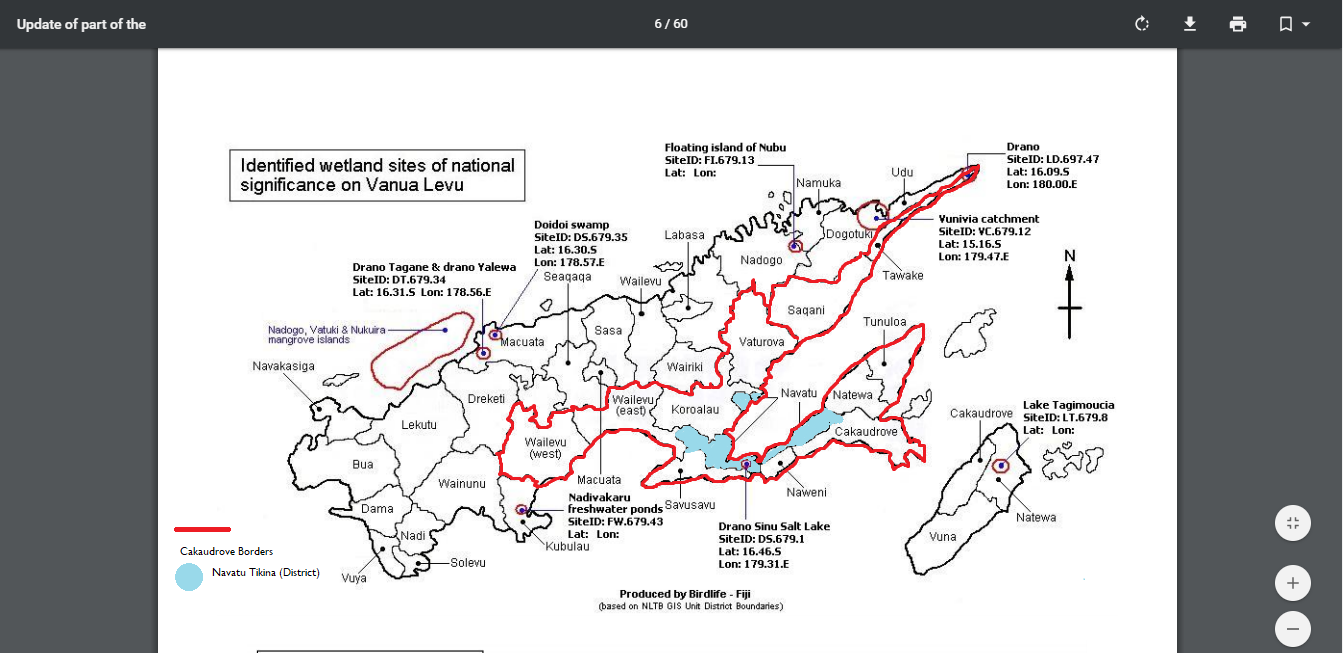

== History ==
The name Navatu means 'The Rock' and is derived from the Navatu tribe or Yavusa navatu which resides in the Village of Drekeniwai. A tribe originally from Vitawa village in Ra, that migrated to Nakorotubu tikina, and later to Cakaudrove under the Gonesau's (A traditional chief in Nakorotubu, Ra province) orders to keep watch on the colonies of Vereta residing in the Natewa bay area.

== Vitawa ==
There are accounts that said of an exodus of an ancient tribe called the Daunavatu; A tribe that was tasked with catching turtle for Degei (an ancestral deity in Fijian mythology) when his plantains were ripe. They would catch a turtle with a special stone endowed with special mana (supernatural powers of sort) or sau, the Daunavatu people would present their finest or biggest catch to the Naqilaqila people (Chief priest of Degei) who would then take the turtle to degei along with the plantain. In one occasion the Daunavatu people deceived the snake god by presenting smaller turtles and keeping the bigger ones to eat. The furious degei who came to know of their transgressions sent down (from Nakauvadra) the lila balavu (believed to be wasting disease) upon the Daunavatu people. The Daunavatu people fleeing from degei's wrath, scattered all over Fiji, including Navatusila, Vatulele, Nadroga, Kadavu and NAKOROTUBU. The Daunavatu tribe is one of 3 tribes of the larger Navatu tribe, the other 2 tribes are the Naqilaqila and the Nasogoliku tribe.

== Nakorotubu ==
The Navatu tribe of Cakaudrove is believed to have migrated from Nakorotubu, one of the places that the Daunavatu tribe fled to during the lila balavu epidemic. The Navatu tribe resided at Tanavuso point in the Nakorotubu coast near Nasinu village, Dawasamu Tailevu. The Navatu people shared a close relationship with the Gonesau of Kavula, and the Ratu of Verata. Navatu was an ally of Verata during war and is considered as 'vanua veiwekani', with Verata; this is one of the reason as to why the Navatu people of Cakaudrove considers Verata as their 'Mataqali or Mata'(a form of name calling usually done within the confederacy of Kubuna) and 'vei tabani'or 'tau'to Bau. This alliance between Navatu and Verata lead to the appointment of Malodali, a chief from Navatu to patrol the Natewa Bay and protect and or govern the colonies of Verata that resides there and deliver messages amongst the Verata loyalists. This same chief Malodali, upon the instructions of Nacamavuto the Gonesau of Kavula brought Nailatikau Nabuinivuaka the son of Nadurucoko of Navakawaluwalu, Nabukadra, Ra to seek asylum with the Roko Tui Bau. Some believed that this was how the 'Kawa ni Vunivalu'(the ancestral line of Vunivalu) of Bau came to the island of Bau. Another Navatu chief by the name of Matawalu also made his way to Cakaudrove, some of his people now reside in Korolevu, Vunivatu, Vaturova etc.

== Cakaudrove ==
The people of Navatu under the leadership of Malodali resided first on the mainland at Waidau before moving to a small artificial islet within the natewa bay, which they named Navatu island.

Matawalu, another Navatu chief who came later with some Makogai people first to Nasonisoni, a small island situated at Kubulau, Bua. From Kubulau he settled at Navatu island in Natewa Bay where Malodali had settled. As the island was getting smaller, Matawalu moved to the mainland and settled on Korolevu lands. This migration of Matawalu eastward accounts for the establishment of more people associated with Verata in eastern Vanua Levu. Some of his followers left Korolevu and settled in the western side of the Natewa Bay, namely, Vanuavou (Vusaratu people), Saqani (Saqani people), Natuvu, the Teiteiciva people, the vunivatu and Nautosolo people right up to Udu Point, who still trace their origins to Matawalu's migration from Viti Levu. Matawalu who had established his settlement at Korolevu became angry with the Korolevu who resented his use of their lands. Some claim that he also envied to be the leader of the Navatu people who settled at Navatu island, however, Malodali the Navatu chief refused to cede his position on the grounds that the Gonesau have tasked him in keeping watch of Verata's colony in the Natewa Bay area, a role he intend to retain. The people of Korolevu who have resented Matawalu sided with Malodali the official representative of Verata in that area. A war erupted between the two, and Korolevu and Naurabuta (village of the Weni people) was taken by the victors led by Matawalu and his rebel forces who later took Navatu island. Word of Matawalu's rebellion against the Veratan authority reached the Gonesau of Kavula, who sent an army led by Naboutuiloma Lailai. The rebel forces who have gathered at Caucunu in the vicinity of Nagigi were attacked and fled. The Sinu people who resided in Sinu and Navadra and have sided with Matawalu also fled to Kasavu and Vunilagi. This involved the Cakaudrove (tikina) and Sokula people (who aided Cakaudrove in this war) joined the war against the forces of Naboutuiloma Lailai.

Due to increasing population and the island being uncultivable the Navatu people moved further inland to their fortress Koroniyasaca. Here in their fortress the Natewa people sought refuge during war against the Ai Sokula (present day Tui Cakau). Navatu commanded a lot of influence in the eastern peninsular of Natewa Bay and therefore Cakaudrove (Ai Sokula) and the Natewans competed for their allegiance. The Navatu people were sea people, and were known to the Natewans as fishers of men. Navatu was a close ally of Natewa in times of war even though they were defeated by the overwhelming numbers of the combined Cakaudrove and Bauan forces. A notable Navatu warrior was Cekaloa; Cekaloa was renown for his role in sending back the Bauan forces when Cakobau came to wage war on the people of Navatu, leaving on the Cakaudrove coast. It is said the Cakobau arrived with his war canoes loaded with warriors and canon to wage war against the Navatu people. Cekaloa floated out to Cakobau's canoe in the cover of night with a whales tooth and war club resting on a banana stem. Upon reaching Cakobau's canoe taking him (Cakobau) completely by surprise, he held out his war club on his right hand ready to strike Cakobau down and the whales tooth on his left hand. The Bauan warlord was given a choice by the warrior from Navatu, the club or the whales tooth, Cakobau quickly worked it out in his head that the club meant death and the whales tooth meant life. He chose the whales tooth and was allowed to leave for Bau with his war party. This sort of choice was again given to Cakobau by Vosavakadua.

This account however is contradictory, as it is nowhere mentioned in the TRY for Yavusa Navatu, the account of which was provided by Kilimo Waniu Ramulo himself, the then Tui Navatu. Although, the TRY account states that the Navatu people presented a i "Soro" which in turn saved them from invasion. The story of the invasion is mentioned in their traditional kava ceremony song which give accounts on what transpired during the battle, supporting the former. The song (sere ni yaqona) have been passed down for generations and is a historical account of the stand-off that occurred between Bau and Navatu.

== Ratu i Navatu ==
Amongst the nine villages of the Navatu tikina, the seat of the Ratu i Navatu or otherwise known as Tui Navatu in some cases reside in Drekeniwai village. The title is presently held by the Namatavu clan or mataqali Namatavu of Drekeniwai, Navatu. There are other chiefly titles in the tikina of Navatu, where almost every village has their own 'Turaga ni Yavusa'. Some notable ones that belong to the tikina of Navatu includes Turaga na Tui Navadra who resides in Viani village, Turaga na Tui Loa who resides in the village of Leia, Turaga na Tui Korolevu, from the village of Korolevu and so forth. The title of Ratu i Navatu is a testament of Navatu's links with Verata, as Veratan Chiefs were usually accredited with the title of 'Ratu' instead of 'Tui'. However, in formal occasions within the Tikina of Navatu (Cakaudrove) the 'Ratu i Navatu' or 'Turaga na Ratu' can also and sometimes referred to as 'Turaga na Tui Navatu'. The 'cavuti'for Navatu (Cakaudrove) is Naqorovarua vua na Turaga na Ratu (usually said in occasions within the Navatu yavusa) or Naqorovarua vua na Turaga Ratu, na Turaga na Tui Navatu (usually said during occasions where other yavusa's or tribes from Navatu tikina or outside Navatu Tikina are present).

However, some argue that the title of Ratu for the Tui Navatu is an invented tradition. The use of this "new" title was asserted following the rise to fame of the then popular coup leader and former Prime Minister Sitiveni Rabuka.

== Totems ==
The moray eel (Dabea) is considered to be the totem fish (ika) for the Navatu people, and the Vesi tree as their totem tree or plant (kau). The people of Navatu's vu (traditional deity) is Ramasilevu an ancient being that can shape shift into a heron. In the TRY for yavusa Navatu, the totem fish is shark (qio).

Ika	Dabea (Moray eel)	Moray eels or locally known as Dabea
Kau	Vesi (Intsia bijuga)	
Vu	Ramasilevu-Heron	Heron or Belo - Considered a manifestation of the Fijian deity or kalou vu of the Navatu tribe Ramasilevu
