= Bulou =

Fijian title for a woman of chiefly rank

Bulou (Fijian pronunciation: [mbulɔu]) is a title used by Fijian women of chiefly rank, in the provinces of Nadroga-Navosa and Kadavu, and parts of Serua Province, in Fiji.

It is equivalent to Adi, the title given to female chiefs elsewhere in Fiji.

The equivalent title used by male chiefs is Ratu.

== Bulou Women ==
The title of Bulou is one of high significance, importance, and of great honour among Fijian women. It is used by the Kadavu island of Fiji as the title of a chiefly woman. The rank in the ancient Pacific islander tribal nation goes back generations and is viewed with the same respect as the tribes chief. Although the title is still used for Women of great tribal significance, not all the provinces within the nation of Fiji appoint the same title. The title is mostly given to women in the provinces of Nadroga-Navosa and Serua Province. These are both located on Fiji's southern and largest island of Viti Levu, on the southwestern side of the island.

== History ==
Earliest archeological findings give modern historians a good guess that the first Fijian natives settled on the islands as early as 3500 BC. With the first prehistoric native Pacific population been known as the Lapita. All that is known about the prehistoric race is archeological findings of old pottery or other remanences of the ancient civilization. Archeologists have made the conclusion that the ancient tribes of the Fijian islanders have a stronger connection to the Polynesian cultures than any other ancient Pacific culture. Throughout the centuries the islands that make up the now nation of Fiji had created many dense and complicated languages and different tribes. These ways of life and ideas were able to spread through the invention of the canoe from the trees on the island. It has been said that the native tribes have gone to great extent in tribal battles, even to the point of frequent and common acts of cannibalization. With regards to recent history, the British Empire granted the nation of Fiji its independence in 1970 as the Dominion of Fiji.

=== Culture ===
The culture in the Nadroga-Navosa and Serua provinces is one that if filled with family and joy. People of these provinces are known as one of the friendliest in Fiji, which has seen growing tourism to that region as a result. The natives to these provinces speak a different language the other parts of the island. The traditions of culture have stuck in these regions with the people and the Bulou still practicing in the art of pottery, as their great Lapita ancestors had done so long ago. The women in these provinces are known for being hard workers and increase their communal role every year. They take part in the creation of pots, carpets, clothes, and other neighborhood appliances. Beside home work, women in the provinces are a crucial part of their community and help throughout many different ways of charity.

==== Death Practices ====
When a Fijian Chief or Bulou die, close tribes and clans come together from neighbouring villages to pay their respect. Unlike Western culture, they can have a period of time for grief and sorrow or a celebration of life that can last weeks to even months. This time before the burial ceremony is known as "Reguregu" which has deep ritual meaning. During this time members of the tribe would be partaking in kava ceremonies. The number of days the family decided to wait depends on the family, thought some "night afters", particularly the 4th or in increments of ten have ritual significance. This time is seen as their last moment with the soul of their fallen tribe member or friend. To signify the end of the reguregu, often a Bulou will present the chief with some type of fresh catch. Her offering is small but very significant, representing the end of the time of mourning.

=== Identifying who has a chief title ===
Though, back in the mid and early 20th century most chiefs or people with chiefly tribal significance would "preface their name" with Ratu for men, Bulou and Adi for women.

Nowadays it is not uncommon for a chief or Bulou to not address their title before their name. Between equals in a casual circumstance it is very common to be on a first name basis. However, in relations where the two being are obviously not on equal social levels, either a younger man tribe member or someone who is not affiliated with the tribe, then they would most definitely use their title before their chief's name.

The chief and Bulou of each tribe still have a lot of responsibilities to their tribe, but in these modern times the formalities that were once deeply rooted have partially faded away.

=== Trade ===
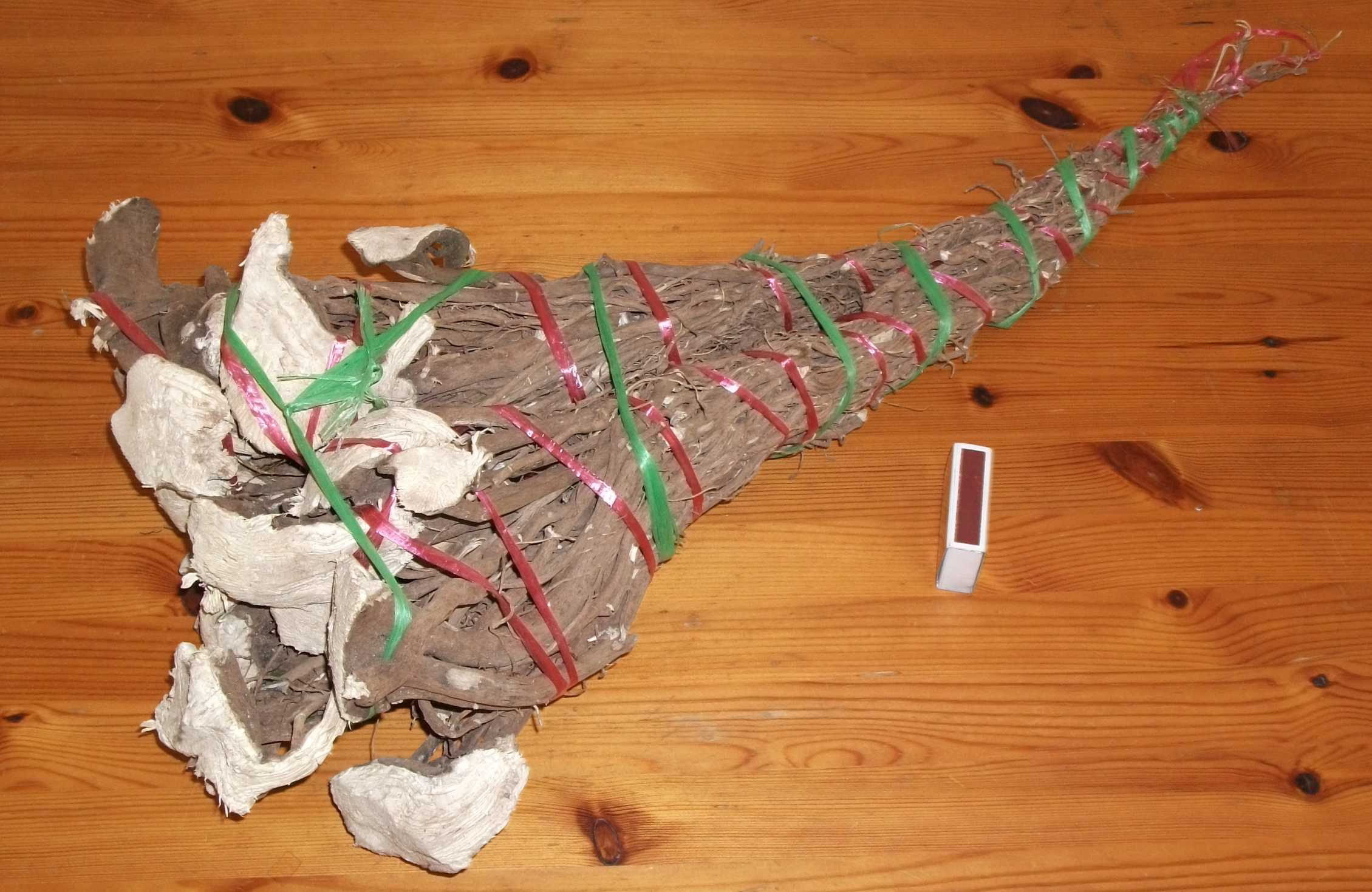
Traditional Fijian bundle of kava roots used for presentations in cultural rituals such as official welcoming, funerals, reconciliation ceremonies; etc. Matchbox added for size comparison.

Many of the small island provinces will be practically self-sufficient to their own economy and trade. Though there is a standard currency in Fiji many of the island tribes will barter and use a trading system inside and out of their tribe. The Kadavu island province will partake in shipping trade with the Suva province. Though this island trade system was never the most reliable, often off schedule, and with old boats. This was definitely a way for underdeveloped and very isolated islands to partake in trade. Though this still takes place, it is very unreliable and the Fijians will only trade like this if they truly need resources. Fijian exports are generally seasonally, with their primary export being the yaqona with small crops and seafood. On a national level, Fiji's biggest export is water, refined petroleum, processed fish, and raw sugar. The main imports to Fiji are cars, planes, delivery trucks and a lot of other resources that they don't have on the island.

==== Annotated Bibliography ====
Tomlinson, Matt. “Publicity, Privacy, and ‘Happy Deaths’ in Fiji.”, Wiley on Behalf of the American Anthropological Association, Nov. 2007, JSTOR 4496845

In this journal, Tomlinson investigates the death of a Fijian chief and the demonic dreams one of the tribal members has of the chief. Tomlinson goes very deep into religion and the transformation of the natives by the missionaries. While reading this article I found a section in it where the author describes the funeral process of a chief and I thought it was interesting how specific days after the death are seeing to have ritual significance in the tribe.

Tomlinson, Matt. “Everything and Its Opposite: Kava Drinking in Fiji.”, The George Washington University Institute for Ethnographic Research, 2007, JSTOR 30052773

This article goes into deep extent into the kava culture in the Fijian islands. The article focuses on the town of Tavuki, and goes into extent on the process of growing the kava leaves and how to mash it into a drinkable substance. On page 1073 it shows a picture of a kava session where, in the photo, a woman who turns out to be a Bulou is handing the chief a plate of freshly caught fish.

Tuimaleali'ifano, Morgan. From Election to Coup in Fiji. ANU Press., 2007, https://www.jstor.org/stable/pdf/j.ctt24hbbn.31.pdf

This article was written to explain the indigenous title dispute and how it looks toward the 2006 election. The author explains how to run for office in Fiji you don't necessarily have to be a chief, though it does help tremendously in social rankings. I used this article because on page 264 and 265, it gives a good example of when one is called by their chiefly title and how the tradition has faded along the years.

“Fiji.” OEC - Fiji (FJI) Exports, Imports, and Trade Partners, OEC, http://atlas.media.mit.edu/en/profile/country/fji/.

This website is an MIT-made website which informs the viewer on almost all economic moves that a country makes, from imports to exports, to where those goods are going. The article breaks each exported item into a percentage of all the different exports. I thought it this was very helpful while examining Fiji's imports and exports as a nation.

== See also ==
- Fijian traditions and ceremonies
- Fijian chiefs
