= Lauwaki =

- Town
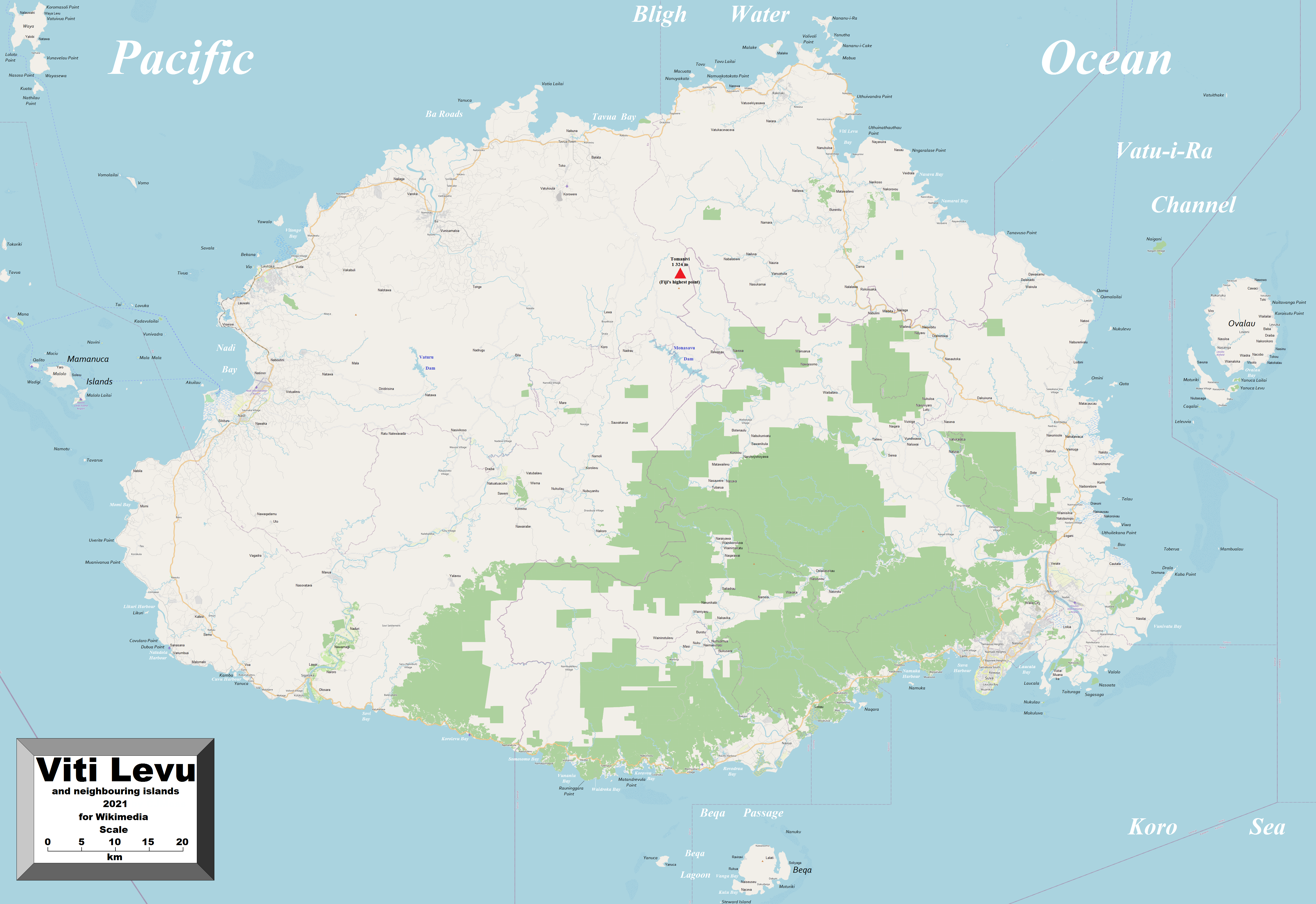
- Viti Levu with Lauwaki in the north west

- Location in Fiji
- Country: Fiji
- Island: Viti Levu
- Division: Western Division
- Province: Ba

Population
  - Total: 550
- Time zone: UTC+12

Lauwaki (Fijian pronunciation: [lɔu̯ɰaki]) is the second largest village (after Viseisei) in the Vuda district, Ba Province in the Western side of Viti Levu, Fiji.

The village is inhabited by a tribe called the Yavusa Na Koi Vuda led by the Taukei Navitarutaru. The tribe is divided into 4 clans, or "mataqali," namely Navitarutaru, Nabasara, Tabua and Nakete, each clan with its own leader. Total population is 550 people in 98 households.

== History ==
The legend goes that Yavusa Na Koi Vuda's ancestors saw from Vuda, their village fortress, Lutunasobasoba's shipwrecked delegate, and rescued the ship's crew, taking them to Nabasagarua for refuge. Yavusa Na Koi Vuda's ancestors were the original rulers and inhabitants of this western part of Viti Levu and were very loyal to their leader, the Lei, a title bestowed upon any leader established many years before the arrival of the Lutunasobasoba family.

Years went by, then LeiNabasara gave the title to Bogisa (Lutunasobasoba's descendant) the first Momo Levu of the Vanua of Vuda, giving all authorities, mystical powers, knowledge, water and land thus strengthening the position to become later Tui Vuda.
