= Tui Namosi =

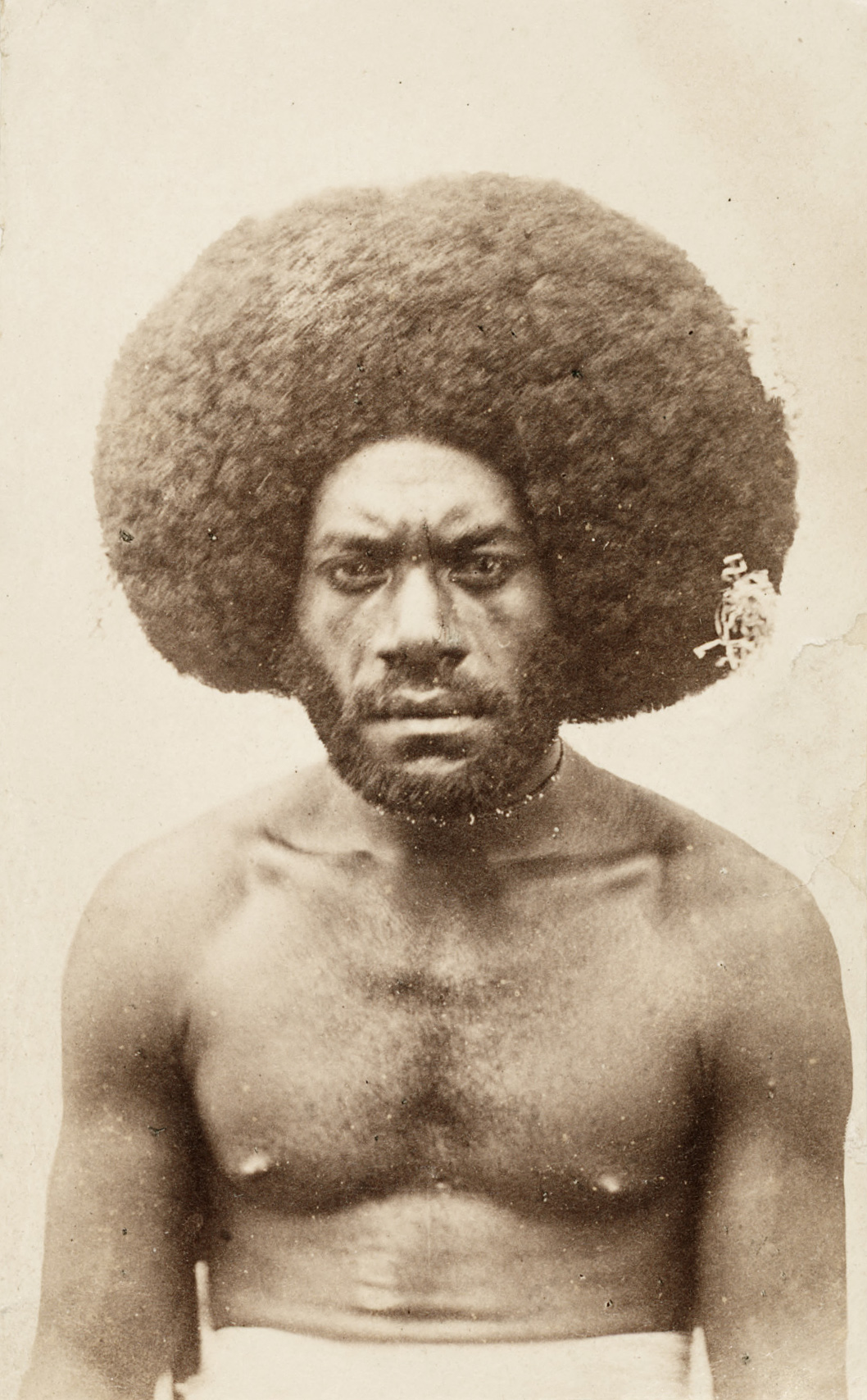
Tui Namosi (Ratu Matanitobua), 1860s

The Tui Namosi is a chiefly title held by the Paramount Chief of Namosi Province on the main island of Viti Levu, Fiji.

== History ==
The clan's progenitor Robatiratu was the vunivalu at the Yavutu of Nabukebuke at Wailase in the Wainimala highlands. Under the leadership of Robatiratu's sons Ronawaqaliva and Rodrodrolagi, the clan then moved to Nairairaikinabukebuke, Mount Voma where they built a village on the left bank of the Waidina River and called it Namosi. The Vunivalu of the Nabukebuke clan was also installed Tui Namosi at this village.

== Current title holder ==
The current Tui Namosi is Ratu Suliano Matanitobua.
