= Roko Tui Dreketi =

Fijian chief

The Roko Tui Dreketi is the title of the Paramount Chief of Fiji's Rewa Province and of the Burebasaga Confederacy, to which Rewa belongs.

== Details on the title ==
This title is considered the second most senior in Fiji's House of Chiefs. The dynasty holding the title is the Tuisawau family. Unlike many other chiefly titles, this one is not reserved for males, as it had become a common occurrence among many other parts of Fiji.

== Recent history ==
The present Roko Tui Dreketi is Ro Teimumu Vuikaba Tuisawau-Kepa, who was the Minister for Education in the Qarase government. She succeeded her late sister Ro Lady Lala Mara, Fiji's former First Lady, in 2004.

== Title holders ==
- Note that the table below contains incomplete information. The period from 1839 through 1845 was a time of conflicting claims to the title.

Order	Roko Tui Dreketi	Reigned	Lived
1.	Ro Rawalai
2.	Roko Tabaivalu	1825 - 1839	? - 1839
3.	Ro Koroitamana	1839	? - 1839
4.	Ro Bativuaka	1839	? - 1839
5.	Ro Macanavai	1839	? - 1839
6.	Ro Cokanauto	1839 - 1841	1810 - 1851
7.	Ro Qaraniqio	1839 - 1840	? - 26 January 1855
8.	Ro Banuve	1839 - 1845	? - December 1845
.	Ro Cokanauto	1845 - 1851	(s.a.)
.	Ro Qaraniqio	1851 - 1855	(s.a.)
9.	Ro B.V. Rabici	1915
12.	Ratu Lutunauga Tuisawau	1917
13.	Ro Emori Bikavanua Logavatu	1885–1892
14.	George Tuisawau	1936 - 1961	1901 - 1961
15.	Lala Mara	1957 - 2004	3 January 1931 - 20 July 2004
15.	Ro Teimumu Vuikaba Tuisawau Kepa	2004–present	b. 1945
