= Suliano Matanitobua =

Fijian politician

Ratu Suliano Matanitobua
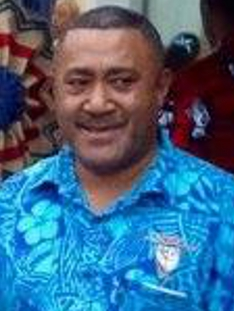
- Matanitobua in 2016

Member of the Fijian Parliament for SODELPA List
- In office 17 September 2014 – 13 July 2022

Member of Parliament for Namosi
- In office September 2001 – 4 December 2006
- Preceded by: Atonio Tanaburenisau
- Succeeded by: None (Parliament disestablished)

Personal details
- Party: Soqosoqo Duavata ni Lewenivanua; Social Democratic Liberal Party

Ratu Suliano Matanitobua is a Fijian chief, politician, and former member of the Parliament of Fiji. In 2022 he was imprisoned for corruption. He is a member of the Social Democratic Liberal Party.

Matanitobua holds the chiefly title of Tui Namosi, to which he was installed in 1999, replacing his uncle, Ratu Leone. He first participated in the Great Council of Chiefs in 1989, at the age of 22. He was appointed as Associate Minister of Fijian Affairs to the interim Cabinet formed by Laisenia Qarase in the wake of the 2000 Fijian coup d'état.

In the 2001 parliamentary election, Matanitobua won the Namosi Fijian Communal Constituency for the Soqosoqo Duavata ni Lewenivanua (SDL), taking 85.5 percent of the vote. In the 2006 election, he held the seat by an even larger majority. He was removed from parliament by the 2006 Fijian coup d'état. In 2009 he announced that his district would support the coup regime.

Matanitobua was elected as a SOELPA candidate in the 2014 elections, the first since the 2006 coup. During the election campaign he was criticised by the Fijian military for saying that his constituents took precedence over his military uniform. In opposition he served as Shadow Minister for Youth and Sports. He was re-elected in the 2018 election, winning 3,279 votes.

On 6 July 2022 he was convicted of providing false information to a public servant and obtaining a pecuniary advantage. He was immediately stripped of his seat in parliament. In August 2022 he was sentenced to three years imprisonment.
