= Ro (title) =

Ro is a title used by Fijian chiefs in the Province of Rewa, as well as in areas of Naitasiri, Namosi, and Serua Provinces.

Both males and females are so styled. In other areas of Fiji, male chiefs are titled Ratu and female chiefs, Adi.

== See also ==
- Alifereti Doviverata
- Fijian chiefs
