= Lomanikoro =

Village in Rewa Province, Fiji

- Village
- Location in Fiji
- Country: Fiji
- Island: Viti Levu
- Division: Central Division
- Province: Rewa
- Time zone: UTC+12

Lomanikoro (Fijian pronunciation: [lomanikoro]) is a village in the Rewa Province of Fiji.
