= Adi (title) =

Fijian title for a woman of chiefly rank

Adi (pronounced "Ahndi") is a title used by Fijian women of chiefly rank, namely female members of chiefly clans. It is the equivalent of the Ratu title used by male chiefs. It is in general use throughout most of Fiji, although on Kadavu Island, Bulou is used instead.

== Notable chieftainesses ==
- Ateca Ganilau
- Finau Tabakaucoro
- Kavu Iloilo
- Kuini Speed
- Laufitu Malani
- Litia Cakobau
- Litia Qionibaravi
- Litiana Maopa
- Losalini Raravuya Dovi
- Samanunu Cakobau-Talakuli
- Senimili Dyer
- Serukeirewa

== See also ==
- Fijian chiefs
