= Namosi Province =

Province of Fiji

Namosi
- Province
- Interactive map of Namosi
- Country: Fiji
- Division: Central Division

Government
  - Type: Provincial Council
  - Body: Namosi Provincial Council
  - Chair: Ratu Kiniviliame Taukeinikoro
  - Paramount Chieftain: Ratu Suliano Matanitobua

Area
  - Total: 570 km^{2} (220 sq mi)

Population (2017)
  - Total: 7,885
  - Density: 14/km^{2} (36/sq mi)

Namosi is one of Fiji's fourteen provinces and one of eight based in Viti Levu, the largest island. Located to the west of Suva, the province covers 570 square kilometers. Its population of 7,885 at the 2017 census was the second smallest of any Fijian province.

== Politics ==
The province is governed by a Provincial Council, chaired by Ratu Kiniviliame Taukeinikoro. The Paramount Chieftain of Namosi is The Turaga Na Tui Namosi, Ratu Suliano Matanitobua.

== Demographics ==
At the most recent census in 2017, Namosi had a population of 7,885.

=== 2017 Census ===
Tikina (District)	Ethnicity						Total
Tikina (District)	iTaukei	%	Indo-Fijian	%	Other	%	Total
Namosi	1,246	99.0	12	1.0	1	0.1	1,259
Kabara	3,717	85.3	450	10.3	191	4.4	4,358
Wainikoroiluva	2,262	99.7	5	0.2	1	0.0	2,268
Province	7,725	91.6	467	5.9	193	2.4	7,885

Part of town of Navua is located in the province, with the other half being in Serua Province.

== Geography ==
A major fault line runs through Viti Levu. Part of this fault line runs between the Navua and Waidina rivers, which were once a single river but now are separate due to ancient seismo-tectonic events. The Namosi Gorge separates these rivers.

== Bibliography ==
- The Pacific Way: A Memoir, page 39, by Kamisese Mara, 1997, reference to the Tui Namosi and Namosi the province
- Memoirs by Polynesian Society, by Polynesian Society (N.Z.), pages 39, 40, 41, published 1945 Indian Botanical Society, original from the University of Michigan, digitized May 19, 2006, reference to the title of the Tui Namosi and the Province of Namosi
- Fiji, page 166, by Korina Miller, Robyn Jones, Leonardo Pinheiro, 2003, Lonely Planet
