= Rewa Province =

Province of Fiji

Coordinates: 18°05′S 178°20′E

- Province
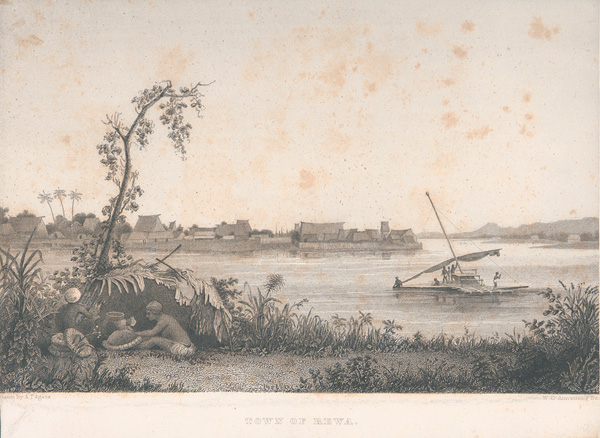
- Rewa as seen during the United States Exploring Expedition
- Interactive map of Rewa Province
- Country: Fiji
- Division: Central Division

Government
  - Roko Tui Dreketi: Teimumu Kepa

Area
  - Total: 272 km^{2} (105 sq mi)

Population (2017)
  - Total: 108,016
  - Density: 397/km^{2} (1,030/sq mi)

Rewa is a province of Fiji. With a land area of 272 square kilometers (the smallest of Fiji's provinces), it includes the capital city of Suva (but not most of Suva's suburbs) and is in two parts — one including part of Suva's hinterland to the west and a noncontiguous area to the east, separated from the rest of Rewa by Naitasiri Province. The province had a population of 108,016 at the 2017 census, making it Fiji's third most populous.

For political and traditional reasons, Rewa is a powerful province. It is the hinterland of the national capital and the heart of the Burebasaga Confederacy, one of three traditional chiefly hierarchies. The Roko Tui Dreketi, or Paramount Chief of Rewa, is the head Burebasaga. The last two holders of the title have been women: Ro Lady Lala Mara (1931-2004), the wife of Fiji's longtime prime minister and President Ratu Sir Kamisese Mara, and her sister and successor, Ro Teimumu Kepa, who was Minister of Education in the government of Prime Minister Qarase (2001-2006). In 2014, she led the Social Democratic Liberal Party (SoDelPa) in the parliamentary election, the first since the military coup of 2006, and served as Leader of the Opposition from 2014 to 2018.

Rewa is governed by a Provincial Council. For a period in the early 2000s, the chairmanship was vacant, and the Council decided not to fill it until the Constitution could be changed to allow parliamentarians to hold national and provincial office simultaneously, thereby allowing their Paramount Chief, Ro Teimumu Kepa, to take the position. In the interim, Pita Tagicakiverata served as acting chairman.

== Demographics ==
Its population at the last census in 2017 was 108,074, making Rewa the country's third most populous province after Ba Province and Naitasiri Province.

=== 2017 Census ===
Tikina (District)	Ethnicity						Total
Tikina (District)	iTaukei	%	Indo-Fijian	%	Other	%	Total
Beqa	1,317	97.1	10	0.7	29	2.1	1,356
Noco	3,532	95.8	119	3.2	36	1.0	3,687
Rewa	6,494	72.6	2,307	25.8	142	1.6	8,943
Suva	60,434	64.2	19,322	20.5	14,332	15.2	94,088
Province	71,777	66.4	21,758	20.1	14,539	13.5	108,074

== Districts, Villages, and Chiefs ==
Rewa has 9 districts and 52 villages

=== Tikina Ko Raviravi ===
This Tikina Consists of 3 villages: Dakuni, Raviravi, and Nawaisomo. Its Chiefs Title is "Raralevu vua na Vunisalevu Na Roko Tui Raviravi".

=== Tikina Ko Sawau ===
This Tikina Consists of 5 villages: Dakuibeqa, Dakuni, Soliyaga, Naceva and Naseuseu. Its Chiefly Title is "Nacurumoce na Turaga na Tui Sawau".

=== Tikina Ko Suva ===
This Tikina Consists of 8 villages: Suvavou, Waiqanake, Muaivuso, Togalevu, Lami, Nabaka, Wainawa, Naivikinikini. Its Chiefly Title is "Turaga na Tui Suva".

=== Tikina Ko Dreketi ===
This Tikina consists of 5 villages: Vunisinu, Nalase, Nabuli, Nadoria, Nakorovou. Its Chiefly Title is "Turaga na Roko Tui Nadugaca".

=== Tikina Ko Burebasaga ===
This Tikina consists of 4 villages: Burebasaga, Waivou, Naivikasara, Suva Lailai. Its Chiefly Title is "Gone Turaga na Roko Tuni Matadreketi".

=== Tikina Ko Noco ===
This Tikina Consists of 10 villages: Nabudrau, Nakuruwai, Nacuru, Taci, Nakauwaru, Navaka, Matanimoli, Naqarani, Naivilaca, Narocake. Its Chiefly Title is "Vunisa na Turaga na Tui Noco".

=== Tikina Ko Toga ===
This Tikina consists of 3 villages: Navatuyaba, Vunisei, Muana. Its Chiefly Title is "Vunisalevu na Turaga na Tui Toga".

=== Tikina Ko Vutia ===
This Tikina Consists of 3 villages: Muanaicake, Muanaira, Laucala. Its Chiefly Title is "Turaga na Tunidau".

=== Tikina Ko Rewa ===
This Tikina Consists of 11 villages: Lomanikoro, Nasigatoka, Nukutubu, Nabua, Nasilai, Drekena, Vunuku, Tavuya, Nukui, Narocivo, Lokia. Its Chiefly Title is "Burebasaga na Gone Marama na Roko Tui Dreketi na Vunivalu".
