= House of Representatives of Fiji =

Former lower house of Fiji; abolished in 2003

The House of Representatives was the lower chamber of Fiji's Parliament from 1970 to 2006. It was the more powerful of the two chambers; it alone had the power to initiate legislation (the Senate, by contrast, could amend or veto most legislation, but could not initiate it). The House of Representatives also had much greater jurisdiction over financial bills; the Senate could not amend them, although it might veto them. Except in the case of amendments to the Constitution, over which a veto of the Senate was absolute, the House of Representatives might override a Senatorial veto by passing the same bill a second time, in the parliamentary session immediately following the one in which it was rejected by the Senate, after a minimum period of six months.

Also, the Prime Minister and Cabinet were required to retain the confidence of a majority of the House of Representatives to remain in office.

The House of Representatives was suspended by the 2006 military coup. The 2013 Constitution abolished it and replaced it with a single chamber Parliament.

== History ==
The House of Representatives dated from 10 October 1970, when Fiji attained independence from the United Kingdom. Under a grandfather clause in the 1970 Constitution, the old Legislative Council, which had functioned in various forms since 1904, was renamed the House of Representatives and continued in office until 1972, when the first post-independence elections were held. Membership of the House of Representatives was increased from 36 to 52 in 1972, and to 70 in 1992. By the time of its suspension and abolition it had 71 members, all of whom were elected for five-year terms to represent single-member constituencies.

== Electoral system ==
- See main articles: Electoral system of Fiji, Voting system of Fiji

The electoral system was changed a number of times after independence in an effort to meet the competing demands of Fiji's diverse ethnic communities. In elections from 1972 through 1987, Fiji was divided into communal and national constituencies. The former were elected by voters registered as members of specific ethnic groups (12 indigenous Fijians, 12 Indo-Fijians, and 3 General electors – Caucasians, Chinese, and other minorities); the latter were allocated to specific ethnic groups (10 indigenous Fijians, 10 Indo-Fijians, and 5 General Electors), but elected by universal suffrage. The system was a compromise between indigenous demands for a strictly communal franchise (based on fears of being swamped by an Indo-Fijian block-vote) and Indo-Fijian calls for universal suffrage, and was never widely popular. Ethnic Fijian nationalists blamed the national constituencies for the election of an Indo-Fijian dominated government in 1987, and following two military coups, they were abolished by the new republican Constitution of 1990.

The elections of 1992 and 1994 saw all 70 members elected from communal constituencies; this system was widely resented by many Indo-Fijians, who complained that only 27 seats were allocated to them as opposed to 37 to ethnic Fijians, despite the near equality of their numbers at that time. A further 5 seats were allocated to minority groups.

A constitutional review in 1997 introduced a new system, with 71 members. 25 were elected by universal suffrage from Open constituencies ("open" meaning that the franchise was open to all locally resident Fijian citizens, irrespective of their ethnic background), with the remaining 46 elected from communal constituencies, with 23 seats reserved for ethnic Fijians, 19 for Indo-Fijians, 1 for Rotuman Islanders, and 3 for "General Electors" – Europeans, Chinese, Banaban Islanders, and other minorities. Every Fijian citizen eligible to vote thus had two votes – one for an open electorate, and one for a communal electorate. The system remained controversial, however.

The open constituencies differed from the former national constituencies in that while both comprised all registered voters on a common voters' roll, regardless of race, the open constituencies might be contested by members of any ethnic group whereas the national constituencies were ethnically allocated.

== Organization ==
At its first session following a general election, the House of Representatives would elect a Speaker and a Deputy Speaker. With a view to ensuring impartiality, the Speaker was not allowed to be a member of the House, though he was required to qualify for membership. The Deputy Speaker, however, was elected from among members of the House.

== Speaker and Deputy Speaker ==
Office
Incumbent
Speaker
Pita Nacuva [1]
Deputy Speaker
Niko Nawaikula [2]
[1] The Speaker was not allowed to be a member of the House.

[2] The Deputy Speaker was required to be a member of the House. The last Deputy Speaker, Niko Nawaikula, represented the Cakaudrove West Fijian Communal Constituency for the Soqosoqo Duavata ni Lewenivanua (SDL) Party.

== Open Electorates ==
Electorate
Member of Parliament
Political Party
Ba
Mahendra Chaudhry
FLP
Bua Macuata West
Ratu Josefa Dimuri
Soqosoqo Duavata ni Lewenivanua
Cakaudrove West
Ratu Osea Vakalalabure
SDL
Cunningham
Rajesh Singh
SDL
Labasa
Poseci Bune
Fiji Labour Party
Lami
Mere Samisoni
SDL
Lau Taveuni Rotuma
Colonel Savenaca Draunidalo
Fiji Labour Party
Laucala
Losena T. Salabula
SDL
Lautoka City
Daniel Urai Manufolau
Fiji Labour Party
Lomaivuna Namosi Kadavu
Ted Young
SDL
Macuata East
Agni Deo Singh
Fiji Labour Party
Magodro
Gyan Singh
Fiji Labour Party
Nadi
Amjad Ali
Fiji Labour Party
Nadroga
Mesulame Rakuro
SDL
Nasinu Rewa
Azim Hussein
Fiji Labour Party
Nausori Naitasiri
Asaeli Masilaca
SDL
Ra
George Shiu Raj
SDL
Samabula Tamavua
Monica Raghwan
Fiji Labour Party
Serua Navosa
Jone Navakamocea
SDL
Suva City
Misaele Weleilakeba
SDL
Tailevu North Ovalau
Josefa Bole Vosanibola
SDL
Tailevu South Lomaiviti
Adi Asenaca Coboiverata Caucau-Filipe
SDL
Tavua
Damodaran Nair
Fiji Labour Party
Vuda
Felix Anthony
Fiji Labour Party
Yasawa Nawaka
Adi Sivia Qoro
Fiji Labour Party
- FLP: Fiji Labour Party
- SDL: Soqosoqo Duavata ni Lewenivanua

== Communal Electorates (Fijian) ==
Electorate
Member of Parliament
Political Party
Ba East
Paulo Ralulu
SDL
Ba West
Ratu Meli Q. Saukuru
SDL
Bua
Mitieli Bulanauca
SDL
Cakaudrove East
Ratu Naiqama Lalabalavu
SDL
Cakaudrove West
Niko Nawaikula
SDL
Kadavu
Konisi T. Yabaki
SDL
Lau
Laisenia Qarase
SDL
Lomaiviti
Simione Kaitani
SDL
Macuata
Isireli Leweniqila
SDL
Nadroga Navosa
Ratu Isikeli Tasere
SDL
Naitasiri
Ilaitia Bulidiri Tuisese
SDL
Namosi
Ro Suliano Matanitobua
SDL
Nasinu Urban
Inoke Luveni
SDL
North East Urban
Nanise Nagusuca
SDL
North West Urban
Joji N. Banuve
SDL
Ra
Tomasi Vuetilovoni
SDL
Rewa
Ro Teimumu Vuikaba Kepa
SDL
Serua
Pio Tabaiwalu
SDL
South West Urban
Ratu Jone Kubuabola
SDL
Suva City Urban
Mataiasi V. Ragiagia
SDL
Tailevu North
Samisoni Tikoinasau
SDL
Tailevu South
Irami Matairavula
SDL
Tamavua Laucala Urban
Ratu Jone Wagairatu
SDL
- SDL: Soqosoqo Duavata ni Lewenivanua

== Communal Electorates (Indo-Fijian) ==
Electorate
Member of Parliament
Political Party
Ba East
Jain Kumar
Fiji Labour Party
Ba West
Narendra K. Padarath
FLP
Labasa
Kamlesh Reddy
FLP
Labasa Rural
Mohammed Tahir
FLP
Laucala
Dewan Chand
FLP
Lautoka City
Jai Gawander
FLP
Lautoka Rural
Udit Narayan
FLP
Macuata East Cakaudrove
Vijay Chand
FLP
Nadi Rural
Perumal Mupnar
FLP
Nadi Urban
Dr. Gunasagaran Gounder
FLP
Nadroga
Lekh Ram Vayeshnoi
FLP
Nasinu
Krishna Datt
FLP
Suva City
Gyani Nand
FLP
Tailevu Rewa
Ragho Nand
FLP
Tavua
Anand Babla
FLP
Vanua Levu West
Surendra Lal
FLP
Viti Levu South Kadavu
Chaitanya Lakshman
FLP
Viti Levu East Maritime
Sanjeet Chand Maharaj
FLP
Vuda
Vyas Deo Sharma
FLP
- FLP: Fiji Labour Party

== Communal Electorate (Rotuman) ==
Electorate	Member of Parliament	Political Party
Rotuma	Jioji (George) Konrote	Independent

== Communal Electorates (General Electors) ==
Electorate
Member of Parliament
Political Party
North Eastern
Robin Irwin
Independent
Suva City
Bernadette Rounds Ganilau
UPP
West Central
Mick Beddoes
United Peoples Party (Fiji)
- UPP: United Peoples Party

== See also ==
- Speaker of the House of Representatives of Fiji
