= List of members of the Parliament of Fiji (1992–1994) =

The members of the Parliament of Fiji from 1992 to 1994 consisted of members of the House of Representatives elected between 23 and 30 May 1992 and members of the appointed Senate.

== House of Representatives ==
Constituency	Member	Party
Fijian constituencies
Ba Provincial	Ovini Bokini	Soqosoqo ni Vakavulewa ni Taukei
Ba Provincial	Serupepeli Naivalu	Soqosoqo ni Vakavulewa ni Taukei
Ba Provincial	Etuate Tavai	Soqosoqo ni Vakavulewa ni Taukei
Bua Provincial	Koresi Matatolu	Soqosoqo ni Vakavulewa ni Taukei
Bua Provincial	Kavaia Tagivetaua	Soqosoqo ni Vakavulewa ni Taukei
Cakaudrove Provincial	Viliame Gonelevu	Soqosoqo ni Vakavulewa ni Taukei
Cakaudrove Provincial	Inoke Kubuabola	Soqosoqo ni Vakavulewa ni Taukei
Cakaudrove Provincial	Sitiveni Rabuka	Soqosoqo ni Vakavulewa ni Taukei
Kadavu Provincial	S. S. Finau	Soqosoqo ni Vakavulewa ni Taukei
Kadavu Provincial	Apatia Seru	Soqosoqo ni Vakavulewa ni Taukei
Lau Provincial	Filipe Bole	Soqosoqo ni Vakavulewa ni Taukei
Lau Provincial	Finau Mara	Soqosoqo ni Vakavulewa ni Taukei
Lau Provincial	Viliame Tunidau	Soqosoqo ni Vakavulewa ni Taukei
Lomaiviti Provincial	Joeli Kalou	Soqosoqo ni Vakavulewa ni Taukei
Lomaiviti Provincial	Maraia Vakatale	Soqosoqo ni Vakavulewa ni Taukei
Macuata Provincial	Militini Leweniqula	Soqosoqo ni Vakavulewa ni Taukei
Macuata Provincial	Emosi Vuakatagane	Soqosoqo ni Vakavulewa ni Taukei
Nadroga and Navosa Provincial	Osea Gavidi	Soqosoqo ni Taukei ni Vanua
Nadroga and Navosa Provincial	Mosese Tuisawau	Soqosoqo ni Taukei ni Vanua
Naitasiri Provincial	Ilai Kuli	Soqosoqo ni Vakavulewa ni Taukei
Naitasiri Provincial	Solomone Naivalu	Soqosoqo ni Vakavulewa ni Taukei
Namosi Provincial	Ifereimi Buaserau	Soqosoqo ni Vakavulewa ni Taukei
Namosi Provincial	Apenisa Kurisaqila	Soqosoqo ni Vakavulewa ni Taukei
North East Urban	Josefa Dimuri	Soqosoqo ni Vakavulewa ni Taukei
Ra Provincial	Joeli Nacola	Independent
Ra Provincial	Kolinio Qiqiwaqa	Independent
Rewa Provincial	Sakiasi Butadroka	Fijian Nationalist United Front
Rewa Provincial	Mosese Varasikete Tuisawau	Fijian Nationalist United Front
Serua Provincial	Mesulame Narawa	Soqosoqo ni Vakavulewa ni Taukei
Serua Provincial	Levani Tonitonivanua	Fijian Nationalist United Front
Serua/Rewa West Urban	Kelemedi Bulewa	Soqosoqo ni Vakavulewa ni Taukei
Suva City Urban	Jonetani Kaukimoce	Soqosoqo ni Vakavulewa ni Taukei
Tailevu Provincial	Josevata Kamikamica	Soqosoqo ni Vakavulewa ni Taukei
Tailevu Provincial	William Toganivalu	Soqosoqo ni Vakavulewa ni Taukei
Tailevu Provincial	Timoci Vesikula	Soqosoqo ni Vakavulewa ni Taukei
Tailevu/Naitasiri Urban	Apolosi Biuvakaloloma	Soqosoqo ni Vakavulewa ni Taukei
Western Urban	Viliame Dreunimisimisi	Soqosoqo ni Vakavulewa ni Taukei
Indo-Fijian constituencies
Ba East/Tavua Rural	Tulsi Ram Khelawan	Fiji Labour Party
Ba Urban	Vinod Patel	National Federation Party
Ba West	Mahendra Chaudhry	Fiji Labour Party
Bua	Raman Pratap Singh	National Federation Party
Cakaudrove	Satish Chandra Gulabdas	National Federation Party
Cuvu/Malomalo South/Sigatoka Urban	Gaj Raj Singh Chaudhary	Fiji Labour Party
Labasa	Shiromaniam Madhavan	Fiji Labour Party
Lami/Naitasiri South/Kadavu	Shiu Charan	National Federation Party
Lautoka City	Ali Ayub Husain	National Federation Party
Lautoka Rural	Jai Ram Reddy	National Federation Party
Lautoka South/Veiseisei/Yasawa	Vinod Maharaj	Fiji Labour Party
Macuata East	Mohammed Latif Subedar	Fiji Labour Party
Macuata West	Rameshwar Prasad	Fiji Labour Party
Magodro/Ba Rural	K. S. Naidu	Fiji Labour Party
Malomalo North/Nadi Rural	Pradhuman Raniga	Fiji Labour Party
Nadi Urban	Dorsami Naidu	National Federation Party
Nadroga East	Lekh Ram Vayeshnoi	Fiji Labour Party
Nasinu East/Rewa East	Harnam Singh Golian	National Federation Party
Nasinu North/Nausori	Narendra Arjun	National Federation Party
Nasinu South/Colo-i-Suva	Sayed Abdul Khaiyum	National Federation Party
Navosa/Serua/Namosi/Naitasiri West/Rewa West	Maan Singh	National Federation Party
Nawaka/Sabeto	Shiu Sharan Sharma	Fiji Labour Party
Ra Central	Krishna Chand	Fiji Labour Party
Suva City Central	Harilal Manilal Patel	National Federation Party
Suva City Suburban	James Raghwan Raman	National Federation Party
Tailevu/Ra East/Lomaiviti/Lau/Rotuma	R. S. Yadav	National Federation Party
Tavua/Ra West	Anand Babla	Fiji Labour Party
General constituencies
Ba/Nadroga and Navosa	David Pickering	General Voters Party
Northern	Leo Smith	General Voters Party
Ra/Tailevu/Lomiviti/Lau/Rotuma/Naitasiri North	Vincent Lobendahn	General Voters Party
Serua/Namosi/Rewa/Kadavu/Naitasiri South	Harold Powell	General Voters Party
Suva City	Bill Aull	General Voters Party
Rotuma
Rotuma	Paul Manueli	Independent
Source: Fiji Elections
