= Aman Ravindra Singh =

Fijian politician

Aman Ravindra-Singh

Assistant Secretary of the Labour Party
- Incumbent
- Assumed office 2017
- Leader: Mahendra Chaudhry

Secretary General of the People's Democratic Party
- In office 2014 – November 2017
- Leader: Felix Anthony; Sivia Qoro

Personal details
- Party: Labour
- Other political affiliations: People's Democratic Party
- Occupation: Lawyer; Activist

Aman Ravindra Singh is a Fijian politician of Indian descent. He is currently the Assistant Secretary of the Fiji Labour Party and an eminent human rights and constitutional lawyer in Fiji. The Fiji Labour Party National Council appointed Singh as their parliamentary leader in preparation for general elections to be taking place in 2019. The Party leader, Mahendra Chaudhary also announced that if Labour Party wins the general elections in 2019, Singh will become the Prime Minister.

== Political career ==
Singh began his political career as the General Secretary of the People's Democratic Party during the 2014 General Elections in Fiji. The Party failed to secure any seats in parliament and Aman later resigned from the Party citing disagreement with Party's board members.

In 2015, Singh had claimed that he received threats for his involvement in high profile sedition cases in the country. Later in 2018 he became part of another controversy when he accused the Prime Minister, Frank Bainimarama and the Attorney General, Aiyaz Khaiyum behind the attacks on the Hindu community, creating a climate of fear and promise of security later. Proceedings were filed in the High Court of Fiji by the Prime Minister and the Attorney General suing him for defamation against posting unsubstantiated comments on his facebook page titled " Regime Dirty Politics". In 2022, he was sentenced to 10 months imprisonment for contempt of court by the Suva High Court. A bench warrant was also issued as Singh failed to appear in court during his sentencing. The contempt of court matter pertains to when Singh was found guilty for defaming Voreqe Bainimarama and Aiyaz Sayed-Khaiyum where he had falsely claimed on his Facebook account that the two had orchestrated temple break-ins. Singh was ordered to pay Bainimarama and Sayed-Khaiyum $60,000 each within 30 days from July 24th 2020. He was to also post an apology on his Facebook page and in all local daily newspapers and remove the article from his Facebook page. He was also ordered to pay both $8000 as costs for the case. He fled the country to avoid the jail sentencing and is currently confirmed to be in hiding in Australia
