= Ponipate Lesavua =

Fijian politician

Ponipate Tawase Lesavua was a Fijian politician, who led the now-defunct Party of National Unity, which drew most of its support from Ba Province in the West of the country. The former Police officer, who spent 20 years in the Criminal Investigation Department, was an outspoken politician, who championed what he saw as the interests of western Fiji. He has endorsed calls for a return to the former system of customary justice, in force during the colonial era, under which convicted offenders would be returned to their villages not only for punishment but also for counselling and correction, according to the Fiji Times (17 March 2006).

== Political career ==
Lesavua won the Ba East Fijian communal constituency in the House of Representatives in the 1999 general election, as a candidate of the Party of National Unity (PANU), which he subsequently led in Parliament, having also acted as Sports Minister. Some major political realignments followed the failed coup d'état of May 2000, and in the general election of 2001, he was defeated by the Soqosoqo Duavata ni Lewenivanua (SDL) candidate, Epeli Seavula. He was subsequently appointed to the Senate, however, by Opposition Leader Mahendra Chaudhry, despite his not being member of Chaudhry's Labour Party, and served from 2001 to 2006.

Lesavua changed his political affiliation twice during 2005. On 7 September 2005, Lesavua announced that he had joined the Labour Party and had applied for the party's nomination for either his old seat, or the Northwest Urban Fijian communal constituency, for the election scheduled for mid-2006. Following the merger of PANU with the Protector of Fiji Party to form the People's National Party, he had quit the latter party on principle, he said, in the wake of its decision to join the Grand Coalition Initiative Group, a coalition of ethnic Fijian parties.

Citing public demand, Lesavua announced on 25 November 2005 that he had decided to relaunch PANU, and would be filing within one week the necessary documents to reregister the defunct party. There was no immediate word on why he had decided not to follow through with his earlier announced decision to stand for the FLP. He confirmed on 11 January 2006 that PANU had been reregistered.

== 2006 election ==
It was announced on 12 March 2006 that Lesavua would contest his old Ba East constituency in the parliamentary election scheduled for 6–13 May. He lost to the Soqosoqo Duavata ni Lewenivanua (SDL) candidate, Paulo Ralulu, by a 2-1 margin, however, and said subsequently that his party's alignment with the FLP had cost him support among indigenous Fijians.

In what Lesavua claimed was a breach of promise on the part of FLP leader Mahendra Chaudhry, Lesavua was not reappointed to the Senate following the elections.

He subsequently became a member of the Fijian Affairs Review, but left in 2007, claiming he had been told to leave by leader Apakuki Kurusiga.
