= Jale Baba =

Fijian businessman

Personal details
- Party: Soqosoqo Duavata ni Lewenivanua; Social Democratic Liberal Party
- Profession: Businessman

Jale Baba is a Fijian businessman and political organizer. A forestry graduate of the Australian National University, he worked for Fiji Pine Limited for more than 20 years, before leaving in 1999 to start his own company. He also served as the general secretary and campaign director of the Soqosoqo Duavata ni Lewenivanua Party (SDL).

On 16 December 2005, Baba was accused by two Senators of corruption. Senator Ponipate Lesavua alleged that Baba, along with Laisenia Qarase, Jr. (the son of Laisenia Qarase, Fiji's Prime Minister) and Lalesh Shankar (another SDL official), benefited from a mahogany harvest at Sote Village in Tailevu. Baba was subcontracted to Fiji Hardwood and was operating an illegal circular saw, Lesavua maintained, while Qarase Jr. and Shankar owned a company called Trapper Haulage, which had been granted the contract. Another Senator, Ratu Dr. Epeli Nailatikau, alleged that the Fiji Development Bank had lent Baba F$79,600 for six months, then F$24,000 three months later, to buy the saw. He questioned why Baba should be granted such loans, when the landowners themselves were not. Baba denied the allegations and accused the senators of cowardice for making them under parliamentary privilege.

At the 2006 Fijian general election he ran in the Ba Open Constituency for the SDL, but garnered only 60 votes. On 15 June 2006, Baba announced his resignation from his party post after being declared bankrupt.

In the wake of the 2006 Fijian coup d'état that deposed the SDL-led government on 5 December 2006, Baba found himself at the centre of an investigation into alleged shady business dealings and political manoeuvrings. On 26 January 2007 he was taken to Suva's Queen Elizabeth Barracks for interrogation about alleged recent comments against the interim government. He was released the next day. Baba was again detained on 28 January, and under intense grilling by Military officials, admitted to approving the sale a government vehicle belonging to the Lakeba Pine Scheme, which he managed then. He made the admission in the presence of the buyer of the vehicle and of a Fiji Sun journalist, the Sun reported on 29 January. In 2000, he approved the sale of the vehicle to a farmer for F$700. He claimed not to have known at the time that the vehicle was government-owned. He was later charged with larceny over the sale, but was acquitted in October 2013.

Following the military regime's dissolution of the SDL, Baba became a founding member of the Social Democratic Liberal Party (SODELPA). In November 2019 he pleaded guilty of publishing false information in relation to Facebook posts made in the leadup to the 2018 Fijian general election which undermined confidence in the Fijian Elections Office. He was convicted and given a suspended prison sentence.
