= James Shri Krishna =

Fijian politician

Member of House of Representatives (Fiji) Labasa Indian Communal Constituency
- In office 2001–2006
- Preceded by: Muthu Swamy
- Succeeded by: Kamlesh Reddy

Personal details
- Party: Fiji Labour Party

James Shri Krishna is a former Fijian politician of Indian descent. He represented the Labasa Indian Communal Constituency, one of 19 reserved for Indo-Fijians, which he held for the Fiji Labour Party (FLP) in the parliamentary elections of 2001.

In 2003, Krishna was offered the portfolio of Minister for Natural Disaster Management, together with 13 other FLP parliamentarians who were offered cabinet positions by the Prime Minister, Laisenia Qarase but the FLP refused to accept this offer.

He retired from politics at the 2006 election and was succeeded by Kamlesh Reddy, also of the FLP.
