= Prince Gopal Lakshman =

Fijian politician

Member of House of Representatives (Fiji) Viti Levu South Kadavu Indian Communal Constituency
- In office 1990–2006
- Succeeded by: Chaitanya Lakshman

Personal details
- Party: Fiji Labour Party

Prince Gopal Lakshman (1949-2016) was a former Fijian politician of Indian descent. In the House of Representatives he represented the Viti Levu South Kadavu Indian Communal Constituency from 1999 to 2006. He held the seat, one of 19 reserved for Indo-Fijians, for the Fiji Labour Party (FLP) in the general elections of 1999 and 2001.

On 19 May 2000, he was among the 43 members of the People's Coalition Government, led by Mahendra Chaudhry, taken hostage by George Speight and his band of rebel Republic of Fiji Military Forces (RFMF) soldiers from the Counter Revolutionary Warfare Unit. He was released on 12 July 2000.

Lakshman announced early in March 2006 that he would be retiring from politics at the parliamentary election scheduled for 6–13 May. He was succeeded by his brother's younger son Chaitanya Lakshman.

== Personal life ==
Lakshman was the son of late B. D. Lakshman, a trade unionist and member of the colonial Legislative Council (1940–1944, 1959–1963). His two sons, Prince Sachin Lakshman and Prince Jatin Lakshman, reside in Melbourne, Australia. Prince Gopal Lakshman died on 15 August 2016, in Navua Hospital, Fiji Islands.
