= JFP =

JFP may refer to:

== Media ==
- Jackson Free Press, an alternative weekly newspaper in Jackson, Mississippi
- Journal of Functional Programming, a scientific journal

== Other ==
- Jamuna Future Park, largest shopping mall in Bangladesh and South Asia
- Jacketed flat point, a type of soft-point bullet
- Justice and Freedom Party, a former political party in Fiji
- Japan Future Party, Japanese political party.
