= Mohammed Tahir =

Fijian politician

Member of the Fijian Parliament for Labasa Rural
- In office 6 December 2003 – 5 December 2006
- Preceded by: Mohammed Latif Subedar
- Succeeded by: None (Parliament abolished)

Personal details
- Party: Fiji Labour Party

Mohammed Tahir is a former Fijian politician of Indian descent. He represented the Labasa Rural Indian Communal Constituency, one of 19 reserved for Indo-Fijians, which he retained for the Fiji Labour Party (FLP) in a byelection held on 6 December 2003 to succeed the late Mohammed Latif Subedar.

Tahir polled 69 percent of the vote in what had long been an FLP stronghold, having been held continuously by the party since the early 1990s. Although impressive, Tahir's share of the vote was 14 percentage points down on what Subedar had received in the general election of 2001. The run-up to the byelection was marred by threats of legal action from Charan Jeath Singh, Tahir's National Federation Party (NFP) opponent, who objected to an FLP campaign brochure which made what Singh said were defamatory allegations that he had helped to finance the Fiji coup of 2000, and that he was involved in vote-buying.

He won the seat with an increased majority in the 2006 election. The military coup of 5 December 2006 prematurely ended his second parliamentary term.

He attempted to contest the 2014 Fijian general election as a Labour candidate, but was declared ineligible by the military regime as he had not been resident in Fiji for 18 months before the election.
