= Lomaiviti =

Lomaiviti may refer to:

- Lomaiviti Islands
- Lomaiviti District
- Lomaiviti Province
- Lomaiviti language
- Lomaiviti (Fijian Communal Constituency, Fiji)
