= Suruj Mati Nand =

Fijian politician

Member of House of Representatives (Fiji) Laucala Open Constituency
- In office 1999–2000
- Succeeded by: Losena Tubanavau Salabula

Personal details
- Party: Fiji Labour Party

Suruj Mati Nand is a former Fiji Indian politician who won the Laucala Open Constituency, one of the 25 open seats, for the Fiji Labour Party during the 1999 elections for the House of Representatives.

On 19 May 2000, she was among the 43 members of the People's Coalition Government, led by Mahendra Chaudhry, taken hostage by George Speight and his band of rebel Republic of Fiji Military Forces (RFMF) soldiers from the Counter Revolutionary Warfare Unit. She was released on 21 May 2000, after she signed a paper resigning her seat in Parliament.
