= Ra (Open Constituency, Fiji) =

Former electoral constituency in Fiji

Ra Open is a former electoral division of Fiji, one of 25 open constituencies that were elected by universal suffrage (the remaining 46 seats, called communal constituencies, were allocated by ethnicity). Established by the 1997 Constitution, it came into being in 1999 and was used for the parliamentary elections of 1999, 2001, and 2006. It is located in the northern part of the main island of Vanua Levu.

The 2013 Constitution promulgated by the Military-backed interim government abolished all constituencies and established a form of proportional representation, with the entire country voting as a single electorate.

== Election results ==
In the following tables, the primary vote refers to first-preference votes cast. The final vote refers to the final tally after votes for low-polling candidates have been progressively redistributed to other candidates according to pre-arranged electoral agreements (see electoral fusion), which may be customized by the voters (see instant run-off voting).

=== 1999 ===
Candidate	Political party	Votes (primary)	%	Votes (final)	%
George Shiu Raj	Independent	2,129	14.65	8,725	60.06
Sanjeet Chand Maharaj	Fiji Labour Party (FLP)	3,826	26.26	5,803	39.94
Ratu Tevita Bolobolo	Soqosoqo ni Vakavulewa ni Taukei (SVT)	3,495	24.06	...	...
Veretariki Wakanivuga	Nationalist Vanua Tako Lavo Party (NVTLP)	2,382	16.40	...	...
Selesitino Luba	Fijian Association Party (FAP)	1,846	12.71	...	...
Joji Banuve	Christian Democratic Alliance (VLV)	850	5.85	...	...
Total		14,528	100.00	14,528	100.00

=== 2001 ===
Candidate	Political party	Votes (primary)	%	Votes (final)	%
George Shiu Raj	Soqosoqo Duavata ni Lewenivanua (SDL)	6,648	48.80	7,151	52.49
Sainivalati Naitala	Fiji Labour Party (FLP)	4,602	33.78	4,617	33.89
Rajesh Singh	National Federation Party	1,059	7.77	1,169	8.58
Unaisi Kinikini Matawalu	Independent	674	4.95	686	5.04
Waisea Qoronalau	Conservative Alliance (CAMV)	506	3.71	...	...
Marika Vukinagauna	Fijian Association Party (SDL)	134	1.71	...	...
Total		13,623	100.00	13,623	100.00

=== 2006 ===
Candidate	Political party	Votes	%
George Shiu Raj	Soqosoqo Duavata ni Lewenivanua (SDL)	10,172	63.54
Epineri Vocevuka	Fiji Labour Party (FLP)	4,870	30.42
Vurewa Aporosa	National Alliance Party (NAPF)	968	6.05
Total		16,010	100.00

== Sources ==
- Psephos - Adam Carr's electoral archive
- Fiji Facts
