= Vyas Deo Sharma =

Fijian politician

Member of House of Representatives (Fiji) Vuda Indian Communal Constituency
- In office 2001–2006
- Preceded by: Vinod Chandra Deo Maharaj

Personal details
- Party: Fiji Labour Party

Vyas Deo Sharma is a former Indo-Fijian politician. In the House of Representatives he represented the Vuda Indian Communal Constituency, one of 19 reserved for Indo-Fijians, from 2001 to 2006.

He won the seat for the Fiji Labour Party (FLP) in the parliamentary elections of 2001 with almost 80 percent of the vote, taking the seat from the incumbent Vinod Maharaj who had been elected on the FLP ticket at the 1999 election but had subsequently defected to the New Labour Unity Party.

In 2003, Sharma was offered the portfolio of Minister for Veterans Affairs, together with 13 other FLP parliamentarians who were offered cabinet positions by the Prime Minister, Laisenia Qarase but the FLP refused to accept this offer.

He was re-elected at the 2006 election, before losing his seat in the 2006 Fijian coup d'état.

In July 2012 he was questioned by Fijian police for allegedly holding a Labour party meeting without a permit.

He was selected as an FLP candidate for the 2014 Fijian general election. In the leadup to the election he called upon dictator Frank Bainimarama to step down, and during the campaign he made allegations about the amount of money in Bainimarama's bank account.

In June 2017 he founded the Association of Real Estate Agents in Fiji.
