= Hikmat Singh Verma =

Fijian politician (died 2021)

Member of House of Representatives (Fiji) Laucala Indian Communal Constituency
- In office 1999–2006
- Succeeded by: Kamlesh Kumar Arya

Personal details
- Born: 1955/1956 Fiji
- Died: 22 July 2021 Suva, Fiji
- Party: Fiji Labour Party
- Profession: Teacher

Hikmat Singh Verma (1955/1956 – 22 July 2021) was a Fiji Indian politician.

He won the Laucala Indian Communal Constituency, one of the 19 seats reserved for Fiji citizens of Indian origin, for the Fiji Labour Party during the 1999 elections for the House of Representatives.

On 19 May 2000, he was among the 44 members of the People's Coalition Government, led by Mahendra Chaudhry, taken hostage by George Speight and his band of rebel Republic of Fiji Military Forces (RFMF) soldiers from the Counter Revolutionary Warfare Unit. He was released on 13 July 2000 after 56 days of captivity.

He died at age 65 on 22 July 2021, from COVID-19 in Suva during the COVID-19 pandemic in Fiji.
