= Sanjeet Chand Maharaj =

Fijian politician

Member of House of Representatives (Fiji) Viti Levu East Maritime (Indian Communal Constituency, Fiji)
- In office 2001–2006
- Preceded by: Krishna Chand Sharma
- Succeeded by: vacant

Personal details
- Party: Fiji Labour Party
- Profession: Farmer

Sanjeet Chand Maharaj (1954 – 29 August 2012) was a Fijian politician of Indian descent. In the House of Representatives he represented the Viti Levu East Maritime Indian Communal Constituency, one of 19 reserved for Indo-Fijians, which he held for the Fiji Labour Party (FLP) in the parliamentary elections of 2001 with more than 66 percent of the vote and the elections of 2006 with more than 78 percent of the votes.

Maharaj's victory came on his second attempt to win election to Parliament. He had previously contested the Ra Open Constituency in the 1999 general election, but had lost to the independent candidate George Shiu Raj.

Maharaj was formerly a Senator nominated by Prime Minister Mahendra Chaudhry after the 1999 elections.

Maharaj was formerly a farmer and social worker.
