= Daniel Urai =

Fijian trade unionist and politician

Member of the Fijian Parliament for Lautoka City Open
- In office 1 September 2001 – 5 December 2006
- Preceded by: Haroon Ali Shah
- Succeeded by: None (Parliament disestablished)

Personal details
- Born: Lautoka
- Party: Fiji Labour Party

Daniel Urai, also known as Daniel Urai Manufolau, is a Fijian trade unionist and former politician.

Urai was President of the Fiji Trades Union Congress. From 1990 to 2006, he was also involved in the leadership of the Fiji Electricity and Allied Workers Union (FEAWU).

He was elected to the House of Representatives of Fiji in the Lautoka City Open Constituency in the 2001 Fijian general election. As an MP he opposed the Reconciliation, Tolerance, and Unity Bill. He was re-elected at the 2006 election. He lost his seat when parliament was dissolved following the 2006 Fijian coup d'état. Following the coup he continue as president of the TUC and continued to serve on the board of the Fiji National Provident Fund.

In August 2011 following the military regime's promulgation of a decree which banned strikes, he was arrested for unlawful assembly after holding a union meeting. In October 2011 he was detained by the military regime while returning from a Commonwealth meeting. He was subsequently charged with sedition over a supposed coup plot against dictator Frank Bainimarama. The charges were eventually withdrawn in 2015.

In January 2014 he was arrested for organising a strike at the Sheraton Fiji. The charge were later dropped.

In 2012 following a break with the Fiji Labour party, Urai joined other unionists in forming the People's Democratic Party. He planned to stand as a candidate for the party at the 2014 Fijian general election, and resigned his position as president of the National Union of Hospitality, Catering and Tourism Industries in order to comply with a regime decree banning union leaders from being political candidates. However, his candidacy was disallowed by the military regime.

At the 2018 election he was accepted as a candidate for the Social Democratic Liberal Party, but was not elected to Parliament.

He was selected as a candidate for the People's Alliance at the 2022 election, but his candidacy was again rejected by the Electoral Office.
