= Muthu Swamy =

Fijian politician

Member of House of Representatives (Fiji) Labasa Indian Communal Constituency
- In office 1999–2000
- Succeeded by: James Shri Krishna

Personal details
- Party: Fiji Labour Party

Muthu Swamy is a Fiji Indian politician who won the Labasa Indian Communal Constituency, one of the 19 seats reserved for Fiji citizens of Indian origin, for the Fiji Labour Party during the 1999 elections for the House of Representatives.

On 19 May 2000, he was among the 43 members of the People's Coalition Government, led by Mahendra Chaudhry, taken hostage by George Speight and his band of rebel Republic of Fiji Military Forces (RFMF) soldiers from the Counter Revolutionary Warfare Unit. He was released on 13 July 2000 after 56 days of captivity.

He was elected to the House of Representatives for the first time in a by-election in 1998. He also played a key role in the National Farmers Union victories in the 1998 and 2001 Sugar Cane Growers Council elections.

He died on 13 May 2001 in Ba after attending the Fiji Labour Party National Council meeting.
