= Tavua =

Tavua may refer to:

- Tavua, Fiji, a town in Ba Province on the largest island of Fiji
- Tavua Island
- Tavua F.C. (for Football Club)
- Tavua District, Fiji
- Tavua (Open Constituency, Fiji)
- Tavua (Indian Communal Constituency, Fiji)
- Tavua (crater), on Mars
