= Emasi Qovu =

Fijian politician

Member of the Fijian Parliament for Nasinu Urban
- In office September 2001 – 13 May 2006
- Preceded by: Joji Uluinakauvadra
- Succeeded by: Inoke Luveni

Personal details
- Party: Soqosoqo Duavata ni Lewenivanua; People's Democratic Party

Emasi Qovu is a former Fijian school principal, civil servant, and politician. He was a member of the House of Representatives of Fiji from 2001 to 2006. Whilst in Parliament he was appointed Government Whip in 2005–2006.

He held the Nasinu Urban Fijian Communal Constituency for the Soqosoqo Duavata ni Lewenivanua Party (SDL) from 2001 to 2006, having won the seat in the parliamentary election of September 2001, defeating the incumbent, Joji Uluinakauvadra of the Fijian Association Party (FAP).

This was his second attempt to secure election to Parliament; in the previous election in 1999, he had unsuccessfully contested the Kadavu Fijian Communal Constituency for the Christian Democratic Alliance (VLV). The Fiji Village news service announced on March 21, 2006, that the SDL had decided not to nominate Qovu for another Parliamentary term. He decided to contest the general election on May 6–13 as an independent candidate, but received only 630 votes, some 5 percent of the total.

In the 2014 Fijian general election he stood as a candidate for the People's Democratic Party. During the election campaign he attacked SDL leader Laisenia Qarase over comments that Fiji could never have equal citizenship.

== Education and career before politics ==
He has a Bachelor of Arts in Education [1977], Post-Graduate Diploma in Public Administration, Masters in Education [1998] from the University of the South Pacific-Fiji and a Doctorate of Philosophy [PhD] in Education in 2013 from the University of the South Pacific-Fiji.

Qovu was a Secondary school principal and worked in various government ministries, primarily the Public Service Commission as Director Training/ Director Scholarships, and the Ministry of Fijian Affairs as Deputy Permanent Secretary.

== Personal life ==
Qovu is originally from the island of Galoa in Kadavu. He attended Galoa Village School, Kadavu Provincial School for Primary & Intermediate years, Queen Victoria School and DAV Boys College in Suva.

He was married to the late Lusiana Mailakeba Golea, a teacher from Wainika, Tawake, Cakaudrove. They had four children and six grandchildren.
