= Qovu =

Qovu is a surname. Notable people with the surname include:

- Emasi Qovu, Fijian politician
- Jone Qovu (born 1985), Fijian rugby union player
