= Nanise Nagusuca =

Fijian politician

Member of the Fijian Parliament for North East Urban Fijian
- In office 13 December 2004 – 5 December 2006
- Preceded by: Filimone Banuve
- Succeeded by: None (Parliament disestablished)

Personal details
- Party: Soqosoqo Duavata ni Lewenivanua (SDL); Social Democratic Liberal Party

Nanise Nagusuca is a former Fijian politician. She was a member of the Soqosoqo Duavata ni Lewenivanua and Social Democratic Liberal parties. She was convicted of sedition in 2017 and sentenced to three years imprisonment.

Nagusuca is from Nokonoko in Ra Province, and was educated at the University of the South Pacific. She worked as a librarian at the as well as at the Western Regional Library in Lautoka.

She was first elected to the House of Representatives of Fiji in the North East Urban Fijian Communal constituency in a by-election in December 2004. Following the by-election she was appointed Assistant Minister For Fijian Affairs, Culture, and Heritage. In December 2005 she was criticised after telling an indigenous women's organisation that human, women's, children's and individual rights were eroding indigenous national identity. She was re-elected at the 2006 Fijian general election, but lost her seat when Parliament was disestablished after the 2006 Fijian coup d'état. Following the coup she served as deputy chair of the Ra Provincial Council.

Following the dissolution of the SDL by the military regime, she joined the Social Democratic Liberal Party (SODELPA). She was named as a SODELPA candidate for the 2014 Fijian general election.

In September 2017 she was convicted of sedition by the military regime and sentenced to three years imprisonment over an attempt to form a breakaway "Christian state" in Ra Province.
