= Jone Kubuabola =

Fijian politician (1946–2018)

Ratu Jone Yavala Kubuabola (11 September 1946 – 16 September 2018) was a Fijian politician. He was the country's Minister for Finance from 2000 until the government was deposed in the military coup of 5 December 2006. He also represented the South West Urban Fijian Communal constituencies in the House of Representatives, to which he was elected as a candidate of the Soqosoqo Duavata ni Lewenivanua (SDL) in 2001. He retained his seat in the general election of 2006. He later helped set up the Social Democratic Liberal Party (SODELPA). He died on 16 September 2018 at age 72. Prior to his career in politics he was the second Governor of the Reserve Bank of Fiji. He was the older brother to Inoke Kubuabola, another government minister.
