= Jonetani Kaukimoce =

Fijian politician (?–2010)

Lieutenant Colonel Jonetani Kaukimoce was a Fijian politician, who served in the House of Representatives from 1992 to 2006. From 1992 to 1999 he stood under the Soqosoqo ni Vakavulewa ni Taukei (SVT) banner. In the parliamentary election of September 2001 he won the Tamavua Laucala Urban Fijian Communal Constituency, for the Soqosoqo Duavata ni Lewenivanua Party (SDL).

Kaukimoce served as a Government Minister between 1992 and 1999 in various portfolios including Youth and Sports, Tourism, Transport, Communication, Housing, Environment and Health. He was appointed transport and civil aviation minister in 1993. He was sacked as Minister of Housing in April 1995.

In his last 5-year term as a Member of Parliament he was Leader of the House from 2001 to 2006, but was not renominated by the SDL and retired from politics at the 2006 parliamentary election held on 6–13 May, and was succeeded by Jone Waqairatu. Kaukimoce was quoted in the Fiji Times on 3 April as claiming that he had won the SDL primary election, but had been rejected by the party hierarchy. He was married to Sisilia Tupou Kaukimoce (née Fotu), with whom he had five sons, and a daughter.

Kaukimoce died at the CWM Hospital on 11 March 2010.
