= Surendra Lal =

Fijian politician

Member of House of Representatives (Fiji) Vanua Levu West Indian Communal Constituency
- In office 2001–2006
- Preceded by: Anup Kumar
- Succeeded by: vacant

Personal details
- Party: Fiji Labour Party

Surendra Lal is a former Fijian politician of Indian descent. In the House of Representatives he represented the Vanua Levu West Indian Communal Constituency, one of 19 reserved for Indo-Fijians, which he held for the Fiji Labour Party (FLP) in the parliamentary elections of 2001 with more than 65 percent of the vote.

In 2003, Lal was offered the portfolio of Minister for National Parks & Recreational Areas, together with 13 other FLP parliamentarians who were offered cabinet positions by the Prime Minister, Laisenia Qarase but the FLP refused to accept this offer.

He retained his seat in the 2006 election with an increased majority, winning more than 73 percent of the vote.
