= Ragho Nand =

Indo-Fijian politician

Member of House of Representatives (Fiji) Tailevu Rewa Indian Communal Constituency
- In office 1999–2006

Minister for Employment Opportunities and Productivity (Fiji)
- In office 2006–2006

Personal details
- Party: Fiji Labour Party

Ragho Nand is a Fiji Indian former politician who was also a Minister in the multi-party cabinet following the 2006 election.

In the House of Representatives he represented the Tailevu Rewa Indian Communal Constituency, one of 19 reserved for Indo-Fijians, which he held for the Fiji Labour Party (FLP) in the general elections of 1999, 2001, and 2006.

On 19 May 2000, he was among the 43 members of the People's Coalition Government, led by Mahendra Chaudhry, taken hostage by George Speight and his band of rebel Republic of Fiji Military Forces (RFMF) soldiers from the Counter Revolutionary Warfare Unit. He was released on 21 May 2000, after he signed a paper resigning his seat in Parliament.

In 2003, Nand was offered the portfolio of Minister for Drainage and Flood Protection & Management, together with 13 other FLP parliamentarians who were offered cabinet positions by the Prime Minister, Laisenia Qarase but the FLP refused to accept this offer.

Following his win in 2006, he was named Minister for Employment Opportunities and Productivity in the multi-party Cabinet that was formed. The FLP members of the Cabinet were advised by its leader, Mahendra Chaudhry, to vote against the 2006 budget and Nand with three other colleagues voted against the budget. The four ALP Cabinet were asked by the Prime Minister, Laisenia Qarase to resign, which they refused to do, but the 2006 coup took place before any further action could be taken.
