= Labasa Rural (Indian Communal Constituency, Fiji) =

Former electoral constituency in Fiji

Labasa Rural Indian Communal is a former electoral division of Fiji, one of 19 communal constituencies reserved for Indo-Fijians. Established by the 1997 Constitution, it came into being in 1999 and was used for the parliamentary elections of 1999, 2001, and 2006. (Of the remaining 52 seats, 27 were reserved for other ethnic communities and 25, called Open Constituencies, were elected by universal suffrage). The electorate covered the rural hinterland of the Town of Labasa, the largest urban area on the northern island of Vanua Levu.

The 2013 Constitution promulgated by the Military-backed interim government abolished all constituencies and established a form of proportional representation, with the entire country voting as a single electorate.

== Election results ==
In the following tables, the primary vote refers to first-preference votes cast. The final vote refers to the final tally after votes for low-polling candidates have been progressively redistributed to other candidates according to pre-arranged electoral agreements (see electoral fusion), which may be customized by the voters (see instant run-off voting).

=== 1999 ===
Candidate	Political party	Votes	%
Mohammed Latif Subedar	Fiji Labour Party (FLP)	5,886	71.80
Mohammed Rafiq	National Federation Party (NFP)	1,811	22.09
Niranjan Kuar	UNLP	341	4.16
Umesh Chand	FGWC	160	1.95
Total		8,198	100.00

=== 2001 ===
Candidate	Political party	Votes	%
Mohammed Latif Subedar	Fiji Labour Party (FLP)	6,128	83.06
Sukha Singh	National Federation Party (NFP)	933	12.65
Deo Satya	New Labour Unity Party (NLUP)	228	3.09
Umesh Chand	AIM	49	0.66
Anil Sharma	Soqosoqo Duavata ni Lewenivanua (SDL)	40	0.54
Total		7,378	100.00

=== Byelection, 6 December 2003 ===
Candidate	Political party	Votes	%
Mohammed Tahir	Fiji Labour Party (FLP)	4,347	69.12
Charan Jeath Singh	National Federation Party (NFP)	1,211	19.26
Subrail Gounder	Soqosoqo Duavata ni Lewenivanua (SDL)	525	8.35
Dildar Shah	Justice and Freedom Party	138	2.19
Mohammed Tazil	Independent	68	1.08
Total		6,289	100.00

=== 2006 ===
Candidate	Political party	Votes	%
Mohammed Tahir	Fiji Labour Party (FLP)	5,279	83.16
Mohammed Rafiq	National Federation Party (NFP)	930	14.65
Satya Deo	Soqosoqo Duavata ni Lewenivanua (SDL)	139	2.19
Total		6,348	100.00

== Sources ==
- Psephos - Adam Carr's electoral archive
- Fiji Facts
