= Fiji Trades Union Congress =

Fijian trade union organisation

FTUC
- Fiji Trades Union Congress
- फिजी व्यापार संघ कांग्रेस (Fiji Hindi)
- Founded: 1966 (1952)
- Headquarters: Suva, Fiji
- Location: Fiji
- Members: 32,000 (2008)
- Key people: Daniel Urai Manufolau, president, Felix Anthony, national secretary
- Affiliations: ITUC

The Fiji Trades Union Congress (FTUC) is a trade union organisation in Fiji that was founded in 1952 under the leadership of Pandit Ami Chandra as the Fiji Industrial Workers Congress (FIWC). As the FIWC the organisation was the third federation in Oceania, after the Australian Council of Trade Unions and the New Zealand Council of Trade Unions, to join the International Confederation of Free Trade Unions. In 1975 the FTUC's membership was 25,000. The FTUC is affiliated to the International Trade Union Confederation. It has a close relationship with the Fiji Labour Party. The FTUC has 30 trade union affiliates, covering the public and private sectors. Major affiliates include: the Fiji Public Service Association, the Fiji Teachers Union, the Fiji Sugar & General Workers Union, the National Union of Hospitality, Catering & Tourism Industries Employees and the National Union of Factory and Commercial Workers Union.

In 2013 FTUC established the People's Democratic Party to contest the 2014 election.
