= Metuisela Mua =

Fijian military officer, intelligence officer and politician

Colonel Metuisela Mua is former Fijian military officer, intelligence officer and politician.

He was the director of the Fiji Intelligence Services, established by Colonel Sitiveni Rabuka's military government in 1988, until it was disbanded by elected Prime Minister Mahendra Chaudhry in 1999.

== Biography ==
He was a leading participant in the civilian coup, led by George Speight, which overthrew Chaudhry in 2000. Mua was described during the coup as "one of George Speight's inner sanctum". He subsequently explained that his aim had been to ensure that the Constitution was amended "to guarantee the supremacy of indigenous rights".

Following the failed coup, Mua was "interrogated and beaten [...] by loyalist soldiers and relieved of his job. He then spent five months in prison", having been "convicted of illegal assembly and consorting with people carrying firearms in parliament". He had initially been sentenced to two and a half years in gaol.

During the 2001 general election, in which he stood as a candidate for George Speight's Conservative Alliance in the North East Fijian Urban Communal constituency, he stated publicly that his party would not work with an Indo-Fijian prime minister. He was not elected.

As of 2005, he was assistant general secretary of the Conservative Alliance. The party later merged into the Soqosoqo Duavata ni Lewenivanua.

In 2007, he was arrested on suspicion of implication in an alleged plot to assassinate interim Prime Minister Voreqe Bainimarama. In March 2010, along with seven co-defendants, he was founded guilty "beyond reasonable doubt" by the five assessors of the High Court, a verdict upheld by Justice Paul Madigan. Mua was sentenced to three years and six months in prison.
