= Laucala (Open Constituency, Fiji) =

Former electoral constituency in Fiji

Laucala Open is a former electoral division of Fiji, one of 25 open constituencies that were elected by universal suffrage (the remaining 46 seats, called communal constituencies, were allocated by ethnicity). Established by the 1997 Constitution, it came into being in 1999 and was used for the parliamentary elections of 1999, 2001, and 2006. It was centred on a suburb of Suva.

The 2013 Constitution promulgated by the Military-backed interim government abolished all constituencies and established a form of proportional representation, with the entire country voting as a single electorate.

== Election results ==
In the following tables, the primary vote refers to first-preference votes cast. The final vote refers to the final tally after votes for low-polling candidates have been progressively redistributed to other candidates according to pre-arranged electoral agreements (see electoral fusion), which may be customized by the voters (see instant run-off voting).

=== 1999 ===
| Candidate | Political party | Votes (primary) | % | Votes (final) | % |
| Suruj Mati Nand | Fiji Labour Party (FLP) | 5,089 | 39.93 | 6,395 | 50.17 |
| Mosese Uluicicia | Soqosoqo ni Vakavulewa ni Taukei (SVT) | 4,125 | 32.36 | 4,266 | 33.47 |
| Miriama Rayawa Cama | Christian Democratic Alliance (VLV) | 1,714 | 13.45 | 2085 | 16.36 |
| Manunivavalagi Korovulavula | Fijian Association Party (FAP) | 1,441 | 11.31 | ... | ... |
| Sowani Tobewaqiri | Nationalist Vanua Tako Lavo Party (NVTLP) | 309 | 2.42 | ... | ... |
| Jag Nadan | National Federation Party | 68 | 0.54 | ... | ... |
| Total | | 12,746 | 100.00 | 12,746 | 100.00 |

=== 2001 ===
| Candidate | Political party | Votes (primary) | % | Votes (final) | % |
| Losena Tubanavau Salabula | Soqosoqo Duavata ni Lewenivanua (SDL) | 3,837 | 33.34 | 6,481 | 56.31 |
| Dewan Chand | Fiji Labour Party (FLP) | 4,558 | 39.60 | 5,029 | 43.69 |
| Daraqa Basilio Kalokalodromu | Conservative Alliance (CAMV) | 774 | 6.72 | ... | ... |
| Abhinash Dayal Vinod | New Labour Unity Party (NLUP) | 761 | 6.61 | ... | ... |
| Pramod Kumar Rae | National Federation Party (NFP) | 697 | 6.06 | ... | ... |
| Mosese Uluicicia | Soqosoqo ni Vakavulewa ni Taukei (SVT) | 535 | 4.65 | ... | ... |
| Tupou Draunidalo | Fijian Association Party (FAP) | 248 | 2.15 | ... | ... |
| Sowani Tobewaqiri | Nationalist Vanua Tako Lavo Party (NVTLP) | 100 | 0.87 | ... | ... |
| Total | | 11,510 | 100.00 | 11,510 | 100.00 |

=== 2006 ===
| Candidate | Political party | Votes (primary) | % | Votes (final) | % |
| Losena Tubanavau Salabula | Soqosoqo Duavata ni Lewenivanua (SDL) | 7,138 | 45.46 | 7,856 | 50.04 |
| Dewan Chand | Fiji Labour Party (FLP) | 6,985 | 44.88 | 7,845 | 49.96 |
| Manunivavalagi Korovulavula | National Alliance Party (NAPF) | 874 | 5.57 | ... | ... |
| Keshwan Nadan | National Federation Party (NFP) | 638 | 4.06 | ... | ... |
| Viliame Civoniceva | Independent | 43 | 0.27 | ... | ... |
| Nimilote Jitoko Fifita | Party of the Truth (POTT) | 23 | 0.15 | ... | ... |
| Total | | 15,701 | 100.00 | 15,701 | 100.00 |

== Sources ==
- Psephos - Adam Carr's electoral archive
- Fiji Facts
