= Simione Kaitani =

Fijian politician and Cabinet Minister

Leader of the House
- In office May 2006 – 5 December 2006
- Succeeded by: None (Parliament disestablished)

Minister without portfolio
- In office 20 September 2005 – 13 May 2006
- Prime Minister: Laisenia Qarase

Minister of Transport and Civil Aviation
- In office 16 December 2004 – 20 September 2005
- Preceded by: Josefa Vosanibola

Minister of Information
- Succeeded by: Ahmed Ali

Member of the Fijian Parliament for Lomaiviti Fijian
- In office 15 May 1999 – 5 December 2006
- Preceded by: None (constituency established)
- Succeeded by: None (Parliament disestablished)

Personal details
- Party: Christian Democratic Alliance; Soqosoqo Duavata ni Lewenivanua

Simione Kaitani is a former Fijian politician and Cabinet Minister in the government of Laisenia Qarase. He was tried for taking an illegal oath over the 2000 Fijian coup d'état in 2005, but acquitted. He later served as Leader of the House, until removed from office by the 2006 Fijian coup d'état.

Kaitani was first elected to the House of Representatives of Fiji as an independent candidate to represent the Lomaiviti Fijian Communal constituency in the 1999 Fijian general election, and later joined the Christian Democratic Alliance (VLV). The VLV disintegrated in the political realignment that followed the coup, but Kaitani joined the newly formed Soqosoqo Duavata ni Lewenivanua (SDL), and retained his seat in the election of 2001 as an SDL candidate. He was subsequently appointed to the Cabinet as Minister for Information. In that role, he introduced a Media Bill in an attempt to control the media.

In November 2002 he was refused a visa to travel to the USA over his alleged involvement in the 2000 coup. In February 2003 Fijian police were reported to be considering sedition charges against Kaitani over a speech he gave to a protest march on the day of the coup. In July 2004 he was one of several prominent people named in the treason trial of Vice-President Jope Seniloli. In October 2004 Senator Adi Koila Nailatikau publicly accused him of involvement in the coup. He denied involvement. The police began an investigation, and in December 2004 he was charged with taking an illegal oath. Prime Minister Laisenia Qarase announced that Kaitani would retain his portfolio despite being charged. He was subsequently shifted to the position of Minister of Transport and Civil Aviation in a cabinet reshuffle on 16 December 2004.

Kaitani was tried from June to August 2005. On 12 August 2005 a panel of assessors found him not guilty of taking na illegal oath. The verdict was confirmed by the court on 15 August 2005.

In September 2005 Kaitani was relieved of his Cabinet portfolios to make way for Conservative Alliance leader Ratu Naiqama Lalabalavu, who had completed a prison sentence for coup-related charged. Kaitani remained in Cabinet as a Minister without portfolio.

He was re-elected in the 2006 election and appointed Leader of the House. He remained in this position until the 2006 Fijian coup d'état.
