= Irami Matairavula =

Fijian politician

Minister for Public Enterprises
- In office 2001 – 16 December 2004
- Prime Minister: Laisenia Qarase
- Preceded by: Hector Hatch
- Succeeded by: Jonetani Galuinadi

Member of the Fijian Parliament for Tailevu South
- In office 1September 2001 – 5 December 2006
- Preceded by: Esira Rabuno
- Succeeded by: None (Parliament disestablished)

Personal details
- Party: Soqosoqo Duavata ni Lewenivanua

Irami Ului Matairavula is a former Fijian politician and former Cabinet Minister.

He was elected to the House of Representatives of Fiji as a Soqosoqo Duavata ni Lewenivanua (SDL) candidate in the Tailevu South Fijian Communal Constituency at the 2001 Fijian general election. He was subsequently appointed Minister for Public Enterprises. As a Minister, he accused the Fiji Public Servants Association of treason for supporting actions by foreign unions against Fiji, and told Indo-Fijians to stick to cane-farming and not try to go into business or get elected to Parliament. He also defended vice-president Jope Seniloli's participation in the 2000 Fijian coup d'état. He was sacked from Cabinet in December 2004.

He was re-elected in the 2006 election. He lost his seat following the 2006 Fijian coup d'état.

He was later nominated to the board of the Fiji Rugby Union.
