= Narendra Arjun =

Fijian lawyer and politician

Narendra Singh Arjun

Member of House of Representatives
- In office 1992–1999
- Constituency: Nasinu North/Nausori Indian

Personal details
- Born: 1935
- Died: 13 January 2006 (aged 70–71) Brisbane, Australia
- Party: National Federation Party
- Profession: Lawyer

Narendra Singh Arjun (1935 – 13 January 2006) was a Fijian lawyer and politician of Indian descent. In the course of his career, he served as president of the Fiji Law Society and as a member of the Sugar Industry Tribunal.

Singh earned an LLB from the University of London in 1964 and was admitted to the bar at the Inner Temple in London the following year. In 1965 he joined the Supreme Court of Fiji. In 1986 he earned an LLM from the London School of Economics and in 1987 started working at the Supreme Court of the Australian Capital Territory and the High Court of Australia.

In the 1992 Fijian general election he was elected to the House of Representatives from the Nasinu North/Nausori Indian constituency as a representative of the National Federation Party. He was re-elected in 1994, serving in parliament until 1999. He was a member of the parliamentary committee that oversaw the review of the Constitution in the late 1990s.

The Fiji Times reported on 16 January 2006 that Arjun had died in Brisbane, Australia, after a long illness. His wife Veronica, two sons, and a daughter survived him.
