= Viti Levu East Maritime (Indian Communal Constituency, Fiji) =

Former electoral constituency in Fiji

Viti Levu East Maritime Indian Communal is a former electoral division of Fiji, one of 19 communal constituencies reserved for Indo-Fijians. Established by the 1997 Constitution, it came into being in 1999 and was used for the parliamentary elections of 1999, 2001, and 2006. (Of the remaining 52 seats, 27 were reserved for other ethnic communities and 25, called Open Constituencies, were elected by universal suffrage). The electorate covered eastern areas of the main island of Viti Levu.

The 2013 Constitution promulgated by the Military-backed interim government abolished all constituencies and established a form of proportional representation, with the entire country voting as a single electorate.

== Election results ==
In the following tables, the primary vote refers to first-preference votes cast. The final vote refers to the final tally after votes for low-polling candidates have been progressively redistributed to other candidates according to pre-arranged electoral agreements (see electoral fusion), which may be customized by the voters (see instant run-off voting).

=== 1999 ===
Candidate	Political party	Votes	%
Krishna Chand Sharma	Fiji Labour Party (FLP)	4,011	62.69
Dhirendra Kumar	National Federation Party (NFP)	2,387	37.31
Total		6,398	100.00

=== 2001 ===
Candidate	Political party	Votes	%
Sanjeet Chand Maharaj	Fiji Labour Party (FLP)	4,066	66.46
Dhirendra Kumar	National Federation Party (NFP)	1,487	24.31
Satya Silanind	Independent	565	9.24
Total		6,118	100.00

=== 2006 ===
Candidate	Political party	Votes	%
Sanjeet Chand Maharaj	Fiji Labour Party (FLP)	4,744	78.39
Bhima Sami	National Federation Party (NFP)	946	15.63
Jayant Prasad Maharaj	Independent	200	3.30
Akmal Ellyas Ali	Soqosoqo Duavata ni Lewenivanua (SDL)	167	2.76
Total		6,052	100.00

== Sources ==
- Psephos - Adam Carr's electoral archive
- Fiji Facts
