= Losena Salabula =

Fijian politician (died 2024)

Minister of State
- In office May 2006 – 5 December 2006
- Prime Minister: Laisenia Qarase

Member of the Fijian Parliament for Laucala Open
- In office 1 September 2001 – 5 December 2006
- Preceded by: Suruj Mati Nand
- Succeeded by: None (Parliament disestablished)

Personal details
- Born: May 1950
- Died: May 2024 (aged 73–74)
- Party: Soqosoqo Duavata ni Lewenivanua; Social Democratic Liberal Party

Losena Tubanavau Salabula (died May 2024) was a Fijian politician and Cabinet Minister.

== Life and career ==
Salabula trained as a teacher, and later worked for the Pacific Concerns Research Centre. She was first elected to the House of Representatives of Fiji in the Laucala Open Constituency as a Soqosoqo Duavata ni Lewenivanua candidate in the 2001 Fijian general election. She was subsequently appointed to the Cabinet as Assistant Minister for Women, Assistant Minister for Social Welfare and Poverty Alleviation, and Assistant Minister in the Prime Minister's Office. In April 2002 she drew public condemnation by saying that incest and child abuse in Fiji was caused by women working overseas. In April 2002 she called the Fiji Labour Party an anti-Fijian group intent on stealing land from indigenous Fijians. In October 2002 she was criticised by the Auditor-General for blatantly disregarding procedures over use of funds.

At the 2006 election, Salabula retained her seat by a mere 17 votes out of more than 15,000 votes cast. She was subsequently appointed to Cabinet as Minister of State in the Prime Minister's Office. She lost her seat, and her ministerial position, following the 2006 Fijian coup d'état.

In May 2007 she was detained by the Fijian military and threatened over her public statements.

In the leadup to the 2014 Fijian general election she joined the Social Democratic Liberal Party (SODELPA) and became leader of its women's committee. She was named as a provisional SODELPA candidate, but ultimately did not contest the 2014 election. She later served on the party's management board. She was selected as a candidate for the 2022 Fijian general election, but won only 60 votes.

Salabula died in May 2024.
