= Ted Young (politician) =

Fijian politician

Ted Young is a Fijian politician, who served in the Cabinet of Prime Minister Laisenia Qarase from 2001 to 2006. He was Minister for Regional Development from 2001 to 2006, when he became Minister of State for Provincial Development. He represented the Lomaivuna Namosi Kadavu Open Constituency, which he won on the Soqosoqo Duavata ni Lewenivanua (SDL) ticket in the general election of September 2001, defeating Samuela Nawalowalo of the Soqosoqo ni Vakavulewa ni Taukei (SVT). He had previously sought to win the seat at the 1999 election, for the Fijian Association Party (FAP), but was defeated by Konisi Yabaki of the Soqosoqo ni Vakavulewa ni Taukei (SVT). (Yabaki himself later became Young's SDL Cabinet colleague).

Young was outspoken in his calls for his home Province of Naitasiri to get a fairer share of government funds.

Following the military coup which deposed the government on 5 December 2006, Young was taken in by the military for questioning. No reason was given. On 21 May 2007, he was taken in again by the military for questioning, and allegedly beaten.
