= Laucala (Indian Communal Constituency, Fiji) =

Former electoral constituency in Fiji

Laucala Indian Communal is a former electoral division of Fiji, one of 19 communal constituencies reserved for Indo-Fijians. Established by the 1997 Constitution, it came into being in 1999 and was used for the parliamentary elections of 1999, 2001, and 2006. (Of the remaining 52 seats, 27 were reserved for other ethnic communities and 25, called Open Constituencies, were elected by universal suffrage). The electorate covered northern suburbs of Suva, Fiji's capital.

The 2013 Constitution promulgated by the Military-backed interim government abolished all constituencies and established a form of proportional representation, with the entire country voting as a single electorate.

== Election results ==
In the following tables, the primary vote refers to first-preference votes cast. The final vote refers to the final tally after votes for low-polling candidates have been progressively redistributed to other candidates according to pre-arranged electoral agreements (see electoral fusion), which may be customized by the voters (see instant run-off voting).

=== 1999 ===
Candidate	Party	Votes	%
Hikmat Singh Verma	Labour	8,816	77.84
Attar Singh	NFP	2,510	22.16
Total		11,326	100.00
Registered voters/turnout		11,326	–
Labour win			

=== 2001 ===
Candidate	Party	Votes	%
Kamlesh Kumar Anya	Labour	8,778	87.28
Vinod Lal	NFP	1,087	10.81
Suresh Kumar	NLUP	192	1.91
Total		10,057	100.00
Registered voters/turnout		10,057	–
Labour hold			

=== 2006 ===
Candidate	Party	Votes	%
Dewan Chand	Labour	13,133	89.18
Sundresan Gounder	NFP	828	5.62
Praveen Chand	NAP	544	3.69
Indar Shah	SDL	203	1.38
Roshan Shah	JFP	18	0.12
Total		14,726	100.00
Registered voters/turnout		14,726	–
Labour hold			

== Sources ==
- Psephos - Adam Carr's electoral archive
- Fiji Facts
