= Ba East (Fijian Communal Constituency, Fiji) =

Former electoral constituency in Fiji

Ba East Fijian Provincial Communal is a former electoral division of Fiji, one of 23 communal constituencies reserved for indigenous Fijians. Established by the 1997 Constitution, it came into being in 1999 and was used for the parliamentary elections of 1999, 2001, and 2006. (Of the remaining 48 seats, 23 were reserved for other ethnic communities and 25, called Open Constituencies, were elected by universal suffrage). The electorate covered the eastern areas of Ba Province.

The 2013 Constitution promulgated by the Military-backed interim government abolished all constituencies and established a form of proportional representation, with the entire country voting as a single electorate.

is an electoral division of Fiji, one of 23 communal constituencies reserved for indigenous Fijians. (Of the remaining 48 seats, 23 are reserved for other ethnic communities and 25, called Open Constituencies, are elected by universal suffrage).

== Election results ==
In the following tables, the primary vote refers to first-preference votes cast. The final vote refers to the final tally after votes for low-polling candidates have been progressively redistributed to other candidates according to pre-arranged electoral agreements (see electoral fusion), which may be customized by the voters (see instant run-off voting).

In the 1999 election, Ponipate Lesavua won with more than 50 percent of the primary vote; therefore, there was no redistribution of preferences.

=== 1999 ===
Candidate	Party	Votes	%
Ponipate Lesavua	PANU	4,413	52.55
Isimeli Bose	SVT	2,932	34.91
Joti Naisau	VLV	578	6.88
Pauliasi Matawalu	NVTLP	475	5.66
Total		8,398	100.00
Registered voters/turnout		8,398	–
PANU win			

=== 2001 ===
Candidate	Party	First preferences		Final preferences	
Candidate	Party	Votes	%	Votes	%
Epeli Seavula	SDL	1,670	21.28	4,602	58.65
Ponipate Lesavua	PANU	1,987	25.33	3,244	41.35
Paulo Ralulu	NLUP	1,556	19.83		
Tevita Momoedonu	BKV	1,554	19.81		
Totivi Bokini	SVT	1,079	13.75		
Total		7,846	100.00	7,846	100.00
Registered voters/turnout		7,846	–		
SDL gain from PANU					

=== 2006 ===
Candidate	Party	Votes	%
Paulo Ralulu	SDL	5,528	60.43
Ponipate Lesavua	PANU	2,888	31.57
Apimeleki Nabaro	NFP	732	8.00
Total		9,148	100.00
Registered voters/turnout		9,148	–
SDL hold			

== Sources ==
- Psephos - Adam Carr's electoral archive
- Fiji Facts
