= Tamavua Laucala Urban (Fijian Communal Constituency, Fiji) =

Former electoral constituency in Fiji

Tamavua Laucala Fijian Urban Communal is a former electoral division of Fiji, one of 23 communal constituencies reserved for indigenous Fijians. Established by the 1997 Constitution, it came into being in 1999 and was used for the parliamentary elections of 1999, 2001, and 2006. (Of the remaining 48 seats, 23 were reserved for other ethnic communities and 25, called Open Constituencies, were elected by universal suffrage). The electorate covered the Tamavua and Laucala suburbs of Suva City.

The 2013 Constitution promulgated by the Military-backed interim government abolished all constituencies and established a form of proportional representation, with the entire country voting as a single electorate.

== Election results ==
In the following tables, the primary vote refers to first-preference votes cast. The final vote refers to the final tally after votes for low-polling candidates have been progressively redistributed to other candidates according to pre-arranged electoral agreements (see electoral fusion), which may be customized by the voters (see instant run-off voting).

In the 2001 and 2006 elections, one candidate won with more than 50 percent of the primary vote; therefore, there was no redistribution of preferences.

=== 1999 ===
Candidate	Political party	Votes (primary)	%	Votes (final)	%
Adi Ema Tagicakibau	Fijian Association Party (FAP)	2,871	28.67	5,489	54.81
Jonetani Kaukimoce	Soqosoqo ni Vakavulewa ni Taukei (SVT)	4,363	43.57	4,525	45.19
Manasa Lasaro	Christian Democratic Alliance	2,780	27.76	...	...
Total		10,014	100.00	10,014	100.00

=== 2001 ===
Candidate	Political party	Votes	%
Jonetani Kaukimoce	Soqosoqo Duavata ni Lewenivanua (SDL)	5,807	61.16
Sireli Korovulavula	Conservative Alliance (CAMV)	1,193	12.56
Mere Tuikoro	New Labour Unity Party (NLUP)	989	10.42
Aisake Kaunisela Kubuabola	Soqosoqo ni Vakavulewa ni Taukei (SVT)	645	6.79
Ilaisa Senimoli	Fiji Labour Party (FLP)	358	3.77
Adi Ema Tagicakibau	Fijian Association Party (FAP)	279	2.94
Taniela Tabu	Christian Democratic Alliance (VLV)	224	2.36
Total		6,247	100.00

=== 2006 ===
Candidate	Political party	Votes	%
Ratu Jone Waqairatu	Soqosoqo Duavata ni Lewenivanua (SDL)	10,880	84.92
Jone Tubuto	Fiji Labour Party (FLP)	970	7.57
Netani Sukanaivalu	National Alliance Party (NAPF)	788	6.15
Laisiasa Corerega	National Federation Party (NFP)	128	1.00
Kepu Kaumaitotoya	Party of the Truth (POTT)	28	0.22
Basilio Kalokalodromu	Independent	18	0.14
Total		12,812	100.00

== Sources ==
- Psephos - Adam Carr's electoral archive
- Fiji Facts
