= Vinod Maharaj =

Fijian politician

Vinod Chandra Deo Maharaj

Member of House of Representatives (Fiji) Vuda Indian Communal Constituency
- In office 1999–2000
- Succeeded by: Vyas Deo Sharma

Personal details
- Party: Fiji Labour Party, New Labour Unity Party

Vinod Chandra Deo Maharaj is a Fiji Indian politician who won the Vuda Indian Communal Constituency, one of the 19 seats reserved for Fiji citizens of Indian origin, for the Fiji Labour Party (FLP) during the 1999 elections for the House of Representatives.

On 19 May 2000, he was among the 43 members of the People's Coalition Government, led by Mahendra Chaudhry, taken hostage by George Speight and his band of rebel Republic of Fiji Military Forces (RFMF) soldiers from the Counter Revolutionary Warfare Unit. He was released on 12 July 2000.

After failing to get endorsement from the FLP, he contested the 2001 election as a candidate for New Labour Unity Party the but managed to get only 2.76% of the vote.
