= Mohammed Latif Subedar =

Fijian politician

Member of House of Representatives (Fiji) Labasa Rural Indian Communal Constituency
- In office 1999–2003
- Succeeded by: Mohammed Tahir

Personal details
- Party: Fiji Labour Party

Mohammed Latif Subedar is a Fiji Indian politician who won the Labasa Rural Indian Communal Constituency, one of the 19 seats reserved for Fiji citizens of Indian origin, for the Fiji Labour Party during the 1999 election and the 2001 election for the House of Representatives.

On 19 May 2000, he was among the 43 members of the People's Coalition Government, led by Mahendra Chaudhry, taken hostage by George Speight and his band of rebel Republic of Fiji Military Forces (RFMF) soldiers from the Counter Revolutionary Warfare Unit. He was released on 13 July 2000 after 56 days of captivity.

He had first entered House of Representatives in 1992 general election but lost his seat to the National Federation Party opponent in the 1994 election.

He died in August 2003.
