= Charan Jeath Singh =

Fijian politician

The Honourable Charan Jeath Singh MP
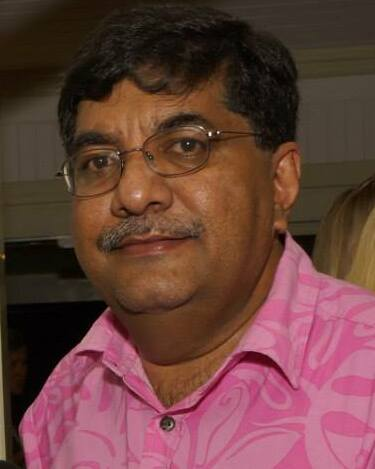
- Charan Jeath Singh in 2014

Minister for Public Enterprises
- Incumbent
- Assumed office 19 January 2026
- Prime Minister: Sitiveni Rabuka
- Preceded by: Sitiveni Rabuka

Minister for Multi-Ethnic Affairs
- Incumbent
- Assumed office 24 December 2022

Minister for Sugar
- Incumbent
- Assumed office 24 December 2022

Member of the Fijian Parliament for PA List
- Incumbent
- Assumed office 14 December 2022

Member of the Fijian Parliament for Macuata West Indian Communal Constituency
- In office 1994–1999

Personal details
- Born: 1961 or 1962 (age 63–64)
- Party: National Federation Party; People's Alliance

Charan Jeath Singh is an Indo-Fijian businessman, politician, and Cabinet Minister. From 1992 to 2005 he was Mayor of Labasa. He is the founder of the CJS Group of companies.

== Early life ==
Singh is from Labasa and was educated at All Saints School and Labasa College before training as a pilot at Ardmore Flying School in New Zealand. He worked as a pilot for Air Pacific and Air Fiji from 1982 to 1987, when he went into business.

== Political career ==
Singh was elected the Mayor of Labasa representing the Ratepayers' Association in 1992 but in the municipal elections of 2005 his Association lost in a landslide result to the Fiji Labour Party (FLP), winning only two seats.

In the 1994 general election, he won the Macuata West Indian Communal Constituency for the National Federation Party (NFP). In the 1999 general election he contested the Labasa Indian Communal Constituency for the UNLP but managed to get only 10% of the votes cast. Following the death of the sitting member, he contested the Labasa Rural Indian Communal Constituency in December 2003 for the National Federation Party (NFP). During the election campaign Fiji Labour Party leader Mahendra Chaudhry accused Singh of supporting the 2000 Fijian coup d'état. Singh sued for defamation, beginning a long-running suit. The case was eventually settled in January 2012 with a declaration that Singh did not support the coup in any way.

In the 2006 general election, he contested the Vanua Levu West Indian Communal Constituency, Fiji) for the National Alliance Party (NAPF) and again lost with only 14% of the votes cast.

Following the 2006 Fijian coup d'état he criticised the military regime's detention of journalists, and was arrested by the regime for criticising Mahendra Chaudhry, who at the time was collaborating as interim finance minister. He later formed the Fiji People’s Party in the expectation of contesting eventual elections. In 2013 he supported the regime's Political parties Decree, which effectively banned small parties, and called for the mandatory death penalty for treason to deter future coups. He supported the regime's 2013 constitution. He later applied to be a FijiFirst candidate for the 2014 election but was rejected.

He contested the 2018 election as an NFP candidate, but was unsuccessful.

In March 2022 he resigned from the NFP and joined the People's Alliance. He later said that he wanted to show that the PA was not a racist party but a multiracial team.

He contested the 2022 election as a PA candidate and was elected with 5616 votes. On 24 December 2022 he was appointed Minister for Multi-Ethnic Affairs in the coalition government of Sitiveni Rabuka. He was also appointed Minister for Sugar. One of his first actions as a Minister was to invite Mahendra Chaudhry to chair the board of the Fiji Sugar Corporation.

In January 2026 he was appointed Minister of Public Enterprises in a cabinet reshuffle.
