= Tailevu Rewa (Indian Communal Constituency, Fiji) =

Former electoral constituency in Fiji

Tailevu Rewa Communal is a former electoral division of Fiji, one of 19 communal constituencies reserved for Indo-Fijians. Established by the 1997 Constitution, it came into being in 1999 and was used for the parliamentary elections of 1999, 2001, and 2006. (Of the remaining 52 seats, 27 were reserved for other ethnic communities and 25, called Open Constituencies, were elected by universal suffrage). The electorate covered the Provinces of Tailevu and Rewa in the eastern part of the main island of Viti Levu.

The 2013 Constitution promulgated by the Military-backed interim government abolished all constituencies and established a form of proportional representation, with the entire country voting as a single electorate.

== Election results ==
In the following tables, the primary vote refers to first-preference votes cast. The final vote refers to the final tally after votes for low-polling candidates have been progressively redistributed to other candidates according to pre-arranged electoral agreements (see electoral fusion), which may be customized by the voters (see instant run-off voting).

=== 1999 ===
Candidate	Political party	Votes	%
Ragho Nand	Fiji Labour Party (FLP)	5,381	57.60
Aptar Singh	National Federation Party (NFP)	3,605	38.59
Ahmed Riaz Dean	Fijian Association Party (FAP)	356	3.81
Total		9,342	100.00

=== 2001 ===
Candidate	Political party	Votes	%
Ragho Nand	Fiji Labour Party (FLP)	5,788	75.48
Aptar Singh	National Federation Party (NFP)	1,758	22.92
Clement Claudius Joseph	New Labour Unity Party (NLUP)	123	1.60
Total		7,669	100.00

=== 2006 ===
Candidate	Political party	Votes	%
Ragho Nand	Fiji Labour Party (FLP)	8,058	86.69
Anay Sumeshwar Yadav	National Federation Party (NFP)	967	10.40
Mohammed Tazim	National Alliance Party	144	1.55
Nilesh Chand Maharaj	Soqosoqo Duavata ni Lewenivanua (SDL)	126	1.36
Total		9,295	100.00

== Sources ==
- Psephos - Adam Carr's electoral archive
- Fiji Facts
