= Ba (Open Constituency, Fiji) =

Former electoral constituency of Fiji

Ba Open is a former electoral division of Fiji, one of 25 open constituencies that were elected by universal suffrage (the remaining 46 seats, called communal constituencies, were allocated by ethnicity). Established by the 1997 Constitution, it came into being in 1999 and was used for the parliamentary elections of 1999, 2001, and 2006. The population was predominantly Indo-Fijian and the electorate was a stronghold of the Fiji Labour Party (FLP) throughout its history.

The 2013 Constitution promulgated by the Military-backed interim government abolished all constituencies and established a form of proportional representation, with the entire country voting as a single electorate.

== Election results ==
=== 1999 ===
Candidate	Party	Votes	%
Mahendra Chaudhry	Labour	10,358	60.97
Diwan Shankar	NFP	5,285	31.11
Savenaca Nabeka	PANU	809	4.76
Daben Singh	VLV	490	2.88
Saimoni Baleirewa	SVT	46	0.27
Total		16,988	100.00
Registered voters/turnout		16,988	–
Labour win			

=== 2001 ===
Candidate	Party	Votes	%
Mahendra Chaudhry	Labour	9,651	65.07
Ram Lagendra	NFP	5,181	34.93
Total		14,832	100.00
Registered voters/turnout		14,832	–
Labour hold			

=== 2006 ===
Candidate	Party	Votes	%
Mahendra Chaudhry	Labour	10,709	63.27
Ram Lagendra	NFP	2,981	17.61
Faiaaz Ali	SDL	2,737	16.17
Savenaca Nabeka	PANU	283	1.67
John Dunn	NAP	139	0.82
Jale Baba	SDL	60	0.35
Ralulu Rasila	NAP	16	0.09
Total		16,925	100.00
Registered voters/turnout		16,925	–
Labour hold			

== Sources ==
- India Abroad
- Psephos - Adam Carr's electoral archive
- Fiji Facts
