= Vanua Levu West (Indian Communal Constituency, Fiji) =

Former electoral constituency in Fiji

Vanua Levu West Indian Communal is a former electoral division of Fiji, one of 19 communal constituencies reserved for Indo-Fijians. Established by the 1997 Constitution, it came into being in 1999 and was used for the parliamentary elections of 1999, 2001, and 2006. (Of the remaining 52 seats, 27 were reserved for other ethnic communities and 25, called Open Constituencies, were elected by universal suffrage). The electorate covered Bua Province and other western areas of the northern island of Vanua Levu.

The 2013 Constitution promulgated by the Military-backed interim government abolished all constituencies and established a form of proportional representation, with the entire country voting as a single electorate.

== Election results ==
In the following tables, the primary vote refers to first-preference votes cast. The final vote refers to the final tally after votes for low-polling candidates have been progressively redistributed to other candidates according to pre-arranged electoral agreements (see electoral fusion), which may be customized by the voters (see instant run-off voting).

=== 1999 ===
Candidate	Political party	Votes	%
Anup Kumar	Fiji Labour Party (FLP)	4,630	61.39
Biman Chand Prasad	National Federation Party (NFP)	2,912	38.61
Total		7,542	100.00

=== 2001 ===
Candidate	Political party	Votes	%
Surendra Lal	Fiji Labour Party (FLP)	4,332	65.20
Raman Pratap Singh	National Federation Party (NFP)	1,765	26.57
Sadiq Mohammed	New Labour Unity Party (NLUP)	315	4.74
Dildar Shah	AIM	201	3.03
Raj Pranay	Soqosoqo Duavata ni Lewenivanua (SDL)	31	0.47
Total		6,118	100.00

=== 2006 ===
Candidate	Political party	Votes	%
Surendra Lal	Fiji Labour Party (FLP)	4,886	73.75
Charan Jeath Singh	National Alliance Party (NAPF)	950	14.34
Suvenay Kumar Basawaiya	National Federation Party (NFP)	708	10.69
Bijay Prasad	Soqosoqo Duavata ni Lewenivanua (SDL)	48	0.72
Suresh Chand	National Alliance Party (NAPF)	33	0.50
Total		6,625	100.00

== Sources ==
- Psephos - Adam Carr's electoral archive
- Fiji Facts
