= Nasinu Urban (Fijian Communal Constituency) =

Former electoral constituency in Fiji

Nasinu Urban Fijian Communal is a former electoral division of Fiji, one of 23 communal constituencies reserved for indigenous Fijians. Established by the 1997 Constitution, it came into being in 1999 and was used for the parliamentary elections of 1999, 2001, and 2006. (Of the remaining 48 seats, 23 were reserved for other ethnic communities and 25, called Open Constituencies, were elected by universal suffrage). The electorate covered Nasinu Town.

The 2013 Constitution promulgated by the Military-backed interim government abolished all constituencies and established a form of proportional representation, with the entire country voting as a single electorate.

== Election results ==
In the following tables, the primary vote refers to first-preference votes cast. The final vote refers to the final tally after votes for low-polling candidates have been progressively redistributed to other candidates according to pre-arranged electoral agreements (see electoral fusion), which may be customized by the voters (see instant run-off voting).

In the 2001 election, Emasi Qovu won with more than 50 percent of the primary vote; therefore, there was no redistribution of preferences.

=== 1999 ===
Candidate	Political party	Votes (primary)	%	Votes (final)	%
Joji Uluinakauvadra	Fijian Association Party (FAP)	2,356	25.90	4,587	50.43
Apolosi Biuvakaloloma	Soqosoqo ni Vakavulewa ni Taukei (SVT)	3,027	33.28	4,509	49.57
Inoke Luveni	Christian Democratic Alliance	2,210	24.30	...	...
Sikeli Naiova	Nationalist Vanua Tako Lavo Party (NVTLP)	1,046	11.50	...	...
Nimilote Fifita Jitoko	Party of the Truth (POTT)	234	2.57	...	...
Fereti Seru Dewa	Independent	223	2.45	...	...
Total		9,096	100.00	9,096	100.00

=== 2001 ===
Candidate	Political party	Votes	%
Emasi Qovu	Soqosoqo Duavata ni Lewenivanua (SDL)	5,475	65.73
Suliasi Nacolai Raibevu	Conservative Alliance (CAMV)	1,237	14.85
Meli Tukisi Tikoicina	New Labour Unity Party (NLUP)	605	7.26
Iniasi Vodo Tuberi	Fijian Political Party]] (SVT)	426	5.11
Nimilote Fifita Jitoko	Party of the Truth (POTT)	220	2.64
Liesa Via Tiko	Independent	138	1.66
Joji Uluinakauvadra	Fijian Association Party (FAP)	116	1.39
Joeli Besetimoala	113	1.36	...
Total		8,329	100.00

=== 2006 ===
Candidate	Political party	Votes	%
Inoke Luveni	Soqosoqo Duavata ni Lewenivanua (SDL)	10,631	84.91
Vilikesa Ravia	Fiji Labour Party (FLP)	800	6.39
Emasi Qovu	Independent	630	5.03
Joji Uluinakauvadra	National Alliance Party (NAPF)	459	3.67
Total		12,520	100.00

== Sources ==
- Psephos - Adam Carr's electoral archive
- Fiji Facts
