= South West Urban (Fijian Communal Constituency, Fiji) =

Former electoral constituency in Fiji

South West Fijian Urban Communal is a former electoral division of Fiji, one of 23 communal constituencies reserved for indigenous Fijians. Established by the 1997 Constitution, it came into being in 1999 and was used for the parliamentary elections of 1999, 2001, and 2006. (Of the remaining 48 seats, 23 were reserved for other ethnic communities and 25, called Open Constituencies, were elected by universal suffrage).

The 2013 Constitution promulgated by the Military-backed interim government abolished all constituencies and established a form of proportional representation, with the entire country voting as a single electorate.

== Election results ==
In the following tables, the primary vote refers to first-preference votes cast. The final vote refers to the final tally after votes for low-polling candidates have been progressively redistributed to other candidates according to pre-arranged electoral agreements (see electoral fusion), which may be customized by the voters (see instant run-off voting).

In the 2001 and 2006 elections, Ratu Jone Kubuabola won with more than 50 percent of the primary vote; therefore, there was no redistribution of preferences.

=== 1999 ===
Candidate	Political party	Votes (primary)	%	Votes (final)	%
Isimeli Jale Cokanasiga	Fijian Association Party (FAP)	2,143	22.62	5,378	56.76
Kelemedi Rakuve Bulewa	Soqosoqo ni Vakavulewa ni Taukei (SVT)	3,969	41.89	4,097	43.24
Naipote Vere	Christian Democratic Alliance	1,833	19.35	...	...
Posiano Nuku	Fiji Labour Party	817	8.62	...	...
Manasa Dela Moce	Nationalist Vanua Tako Lavo Party (NVTLP)	618	6.52	...	...
Kevueli Bogilevu	Independent	95	1.00	...	...
Total		9,475	100.00	9,475	100.00

=== 2001 ===
Candidate	Political party	Votes	%
Ratu Jone Kubuabola	Soqosoqo Duavata ni Lewenivanua (SDL)	5,641	61.82
Esaroma Ledua	Conservative Alliance (CAMV)	1,507	16.52
Alipate Doviverata Mataitini	Soqosoqo ni Vakavulewa ni Taukei (SVT)	842	9.23
Mikaele Naqila	New Labour Unity Party (NLUP)	682	7.47
Isikeli Nasoga	Fijian Association Party (FAP)	215	2.36
Lolohea Waqatabu Seru	Nationalist Vanua Tako Lavo Party (NVTLP)	127	1.39
Aisea Vunibaka	Dodonu ni Taukei (DNT)	111	1.22
Total		9,125	100.00

=== 2006 ===
Candidate	Political party	Votes	%
Ratu Jone Yavala Kubuabola	Soqosoqo Duavata ni Lewenivanua (SDL)	10,123	86.41
Viliame Katia	Fiji Labour Party (FLP)	817	6.97
Emosi Silikiwai	National Alliance Party (NAPF)	470	4.01
Seveci Naisilisili	Independent	305	2.60
Total		11,715	100.00

== Sources ==
- Psephos - Adam Carr's electoral archive
- Fiji Facts
