= Lomaiviti (Fijian Communal Constituency) =

Former electoral constituency in Fiji

Lomaiviti Fijian Provincial Communal is a former electoral division of Fiji, one of 23 communal constituencies reserved for indigenous Fijians. Established by the 1997 Constitution, it came into being in 1999 and was used for the parliamentary elections of 1999, 2001, and 2006. (Of the remaining 48 seats, 23 were reserved for other ethnic communities and 25, called Open Constituencies, were elected by universal suffrage). The electorate covered the Lomaiviti Archipelago and was coextensive with Lomaiviti Province.

The 2013 Constitution promulgated by the Military-backed interim government abolished all constituencies and established a form of proportional representation, with the entire country voting as a single electorate.

== Election results ==
In the following tables, the primary vote refers to first-preference votes cast. The final vote refers to the final tally after votes for low-polling candidates have been progressively redistributed to other candidates according to pre-arranged electoral agreements (see electoral fusion), which may be customized by the voters (see instant run-off voting).

In the elections of 2001 and 2006, Simione Kaitani won with more than 50 percent of the primary vote; therefore, there was no redistribution of preferences.

=== 1999 ===
Candidate	Political party	Votes (primary)	%	Votes (final)	%
Simione Kaitani	Independent	1,895	29.78	3,475	54.60
Tomasi Tokalauvere	Fiji Labour Party	792	12.45	1,488	23.38
Jone Kauvesi	Soqosoqo ni Vakavulewa ni Taukei (SVT)	1,363	21.41	1,401	22.01
Etuate Basaga	Christian Democratic Alliance	1,240	19.48	...	...
Timoci Tuisawau	Fijian Association Party (FAP)	707	11.11	...	...
Penitoa Balenagusui	Nationalist Vanua Tako Lavo Party (NVTLP)	367	5.77	...	...
Total		6,364	100.00	6,364	100.00
Note that following his election as an Independent, Kaitani joined the VLV caucus in the House of Representatives.

=== 2001 ===
Candidate	Political party	Votes	%
Simione Kaitani	Soqosoqo Duavata ni Lewenivanua (SDL)	4,517	72.31
Jone Kauvesi	Soqosoqo ni Vakavulewa ni Taukei (SVT)	816	13.06
Tomasi Tokalauvere	New Labour Unity Party (NLUP)	694	11.11
Timoci Qionibaravi	Independent	220	3.52
Total		6,247	100.00

=== 2006 ===
Candidate	Political party	Votes	%
Simione Kaitani	Soqosoqo Duavata ni Lewenivanua (SDL)	5,109	82.28
Jone Kauvesi	Independent	920	14.82
Filise Baleinakoro	Nationalist Vanua Tako Lavo Party (NVTLP)	136	2.19
Iliesa Tora	Independent	44	0.71
Total		6,209	100.00

== Sources ==
- Psephos - Adam Carr's electoral archive
- Fiji Facts
