= Anand Babla =

Fijian politician (1954–2008)

Member of House of Representatives (Fiji) Tavua Indian Communal Constituency
- In office 1992–2006

Personal details
- Born: 1954
- Died: 22 December 2008
- Party: Fiji Labour Party
- Profession: Farmer, Social Worker

Anand Babla (1954 – 22 December 2008) was a Fijian politician of Indian descent. He was a member of the National Farmers Union and Fiji Labour Party (FLP), holding the Tavua constituency from 1992 to 2006. in the House of Representatives. He won the seat in the general elections of 1992, 1994, 1999, 2001 and 2006.

On 19 May 2000, he was among the 43 members of the People's Coalition Government, led by Mahendra Chaudhry, taken hostage by George Speight and his band of rebel Republic of Fiji Military Forces (RFMF) soldiers from the Counter Revolutionary Warfare Unit. He was released on 21 May 2000, after he signed a paper resigning his seat in Parliament. He had a wife, and they had three children.

Babla's political career came to an end with the military coup on 5 December 2006. He died in India on 22 December 2008, following a long illness.
