= Chaitanya Lakshman =

Fiji Indian lawyer, social worker and politician

Member of House of Representatives (Fiji) Viti Levu South Kadavu Indian Communal Constituency
- In office 2006–2006
- Preceded by: Prince Gopal Lakshman
- Succeeded by: vacant

Minister for Local Government and Urban Development
- In office 2006–2006

Personal details
- Party: Fiji Labour Party
- Profession: Lawyer

Chaitanya Lakshman (born in 1968) is a Fiji Indian lawyer, social worker and politician who served in the multi-party cabinet of the Qarase Government as Minister for Local Government.

Lakshman was elected from the Viti Levu South Kadavu Indian Communal Constituency in the 2006 elections as a Fiji Labour Party (FLP) member. The seat had been held by his uncle, Prince Gopal Lakshman, in the 1999 and 2001 elections.

When the Fiji Labour Party decided to join the multi-party cabinet, Lakshman was one of the nine members nominated by the FLP leader, Mahendra Chaudhry. He was given the portfolio of Minister for Local Government & Urban Development. Lakshman, together with three other FLP cabinet members voted against the 2007 budget and were asked to resign by the then Prime Minister, Laisenia Qarase.

Prior to entering politics Lakshman was the Manager of Complaints Division of the Fiji Human Rights Commission and a barrister and solicitor with the Institute of Applied Legal Studies (IJALS) at the University of the South Pacific.

In Parliament, Lakshman was the First Indian to represent 3 Generations in Parliament. His grandfather, B. D. Lakshman, and uncle, Prince Gopal Lakshman, also served as members of Parliament.

Currently Lakshman is a Resident Magistrate based in Nausori.
