= Labasa (Indian Communal Constituency, Fiji) =

Former electoral constituency in Fiji

Labasa Indian Communal is a former electoral division of Fiji, one of 19 communal constituencies reserved for Indo-Fijians. Established by the 1997 Constitution, it came into being in 1999 and was used for the parliamentary elections of 1999, 2001, and 2006. (Of the remaining 52 seats, 27 were reserved for other ethnic communities and 25, called Open Constituencies, were elected by universal suffrage). The electorate covered the Town of Labasa, the largest urban centre on the northern island of Vanua Levu.

The 2013 Constitution promulgated by the Military-backed interim government abolished all constituencies and established a form of proportional representation, with the entire country voting as a single electorate.

== Election results ==
In the following tables, the primary vote refers to first-preference votes cast. The final vote refers to the final tally after votes for low-polling candidates have been progressively redistributed to other candidates according to pre-arranged electoral agreements (see electoral fusion), which may be customized by the voters (see instant run-off voting).

=== 1999 ===
Candidate	Political party	Votes	%
Muthu Swamy	Fiji Labour Party (FLP)	4,037	50.07
Keshwan Padayachi	National Federation Party (NFP)	1,756	21.78
Sanju Reddy	FGWC	1,181	14.65
Charan Jeath Singh	UNLP	814	10.10
Pradeep Singh	Independent	237	2.94
Vinod Prasad	Fijian Association Party (FAP)	37	0.46
Total		8,062	100.00

=== 2001 ===
Candidate	Political party	Votes	%
James Shri Krishna	Fiji Labour Party (FLP)	5,113	73.81
Sushil Chand Ram	National Federation Party (NFP)	1,333	19.24
Edward Rajendra Nagaiya	New Labour Unity Party (NLUP)	364	5.25
Aleem Shah	AIM	76	1.10
Gaya Prasad	Soqosoqo Duavata ni Lewenivanua (SDL)	41	0.59
Total		6,927	100.00

=== 2006 ===
Candidate	Political party	Votes	%
Kamlesh Reddy	Fiji Labour Party (FLP)	6,813	84.14
Jaiwant Kris Arulappan	National Federation Party (NFP)	1,137	14.04
Subrail Gounder	Soqosoqo Duavata ni Lewenivanua (SDL)	147	1.82
Total		8,097	100.00

== Sources ==
- Psephos - Adam Carr's electoral archive
- Fiji Facts
