= Nadroga (Indian Communal Constituency, Fiji) =

Former electoral constituency in Fiji

Nadroga Indian Communal is a former electoral division of Fiji, one of 19 communal constituencies reserved for Indo-Fijians. Established by the 1997 Constitution, it came into being in 1999 and was used for the parliamentary elections of 1999, 2001, and 2006. (Of the remaining 52 seats, 27 were reserved for other ethnic communities and 25, called Open Constituencies, were elected by universal suffrage). The electorate covered south-central areas of the main island of Viti Levu.

The 2013 Constitution promulgated by the Military-backed interim government abolished all constituencies and established a form of proportional representation, with the entire country voting as a single electorate.

== Election results ==
In the following tables, the primary vote refers to first-preference votes cast. The final vote refers to the final tally after votes for low-polling candidates have been progressively redistributed to other candidates according to pre-arranged electoral agreements (see electoral fusion), which may be customized by the voters (see instant run-off voting).

=== 1999 ===
Candidate	Political party	Votes	%
Lekh Ram Vayeshnoi	Fiji Labour Party (FLP)	5,647	61.06
Mohammed Azam Khalil	National Federation Party (NFP)	3,601	38.94
Total		9,248	100.00

=== 2001 ===
Candidate	Political party	Votes	%
Lekh Ram Vayeshnoi	Fiji Labour Party (FLP)	5,856	71.28
Dhruv Ram Sharma	National Federation Party (NFP)	1,986	24.18
Ali Mohammed Jamal	New Labour Unity Party (NLUP)	373	4.54
Total		8,215	100.00

=== 2006 ===
Candidate	Political party	Votes	%
Lekh Ram Vayeshnoi	Fiji Labour Party (FLP)	7,219	81.04
Parma Nand	National Federation Party (NFP)	1,215	13.64
Ashok Kumar	Soqosoqo Duavata ni Lewenivanua (SDL)	474	5.32
Total		8,908	100.00

== Sources ==
- Psephos - Adam Carr's electoral archive
- Fiji Facts
