= Solomone Naivalu =

Fijian politician

Solomone Naivalu is a former Fijian politician, who served in Prime Minister Laisenia Qarase's Cabinet as Minister for Health from 2001 to 2006. In the election held in September 2001, Naivalu won the Cunningham Open Constituency for the Soqosoqo Duavata ni Lewenivanua (SDL), and was subsequently appointed to the Cabinet. He retired from politics during the general election that was held from May 6 to May 13, 2006.
