= Tailevu South (Fijian Communal Constituency, Fiji) =

Former electoral constituency in Fiji

Tailevu South Fijian Provincial Communal is a former electoral division of Fiji, one of 23 communal constituencies reserved for indigenous Fijians. Established by the 1997 Constitution, it came into being in 1999 and was used for the parliamentary elections of 1999, 2001, and 2006. (Of the remaining 48 seats, 23 were reserved for other ethnic communities and 25, called Open Constituencies, were elected by universal suffrage). The electorate covered the southern areas of Tailevu Province.

The 2013 Constitution promulgated by the Military-backed interim government abolished all constituencies and established a form of proportional representation, with the entire country voting as a single electorate.

== Election results ==
In the following tables, the primary vote refers to first-preference votes cast. The final vote refers to the final tally after votes for low-polling candidates have been progressively redistributed to other candidates according to pre-arranged electoral agreements (see electoral fusion), which may be customized by the voters (see instant run-off voting).

In the 1999 and 2006 elections, one candidate won with more than 50 percent of the primary vote; therefore, there was no redistribution of preferences.

=== 1999 ===
Candidate	Political party	Votes	%
Esira Rabuno	Fijian Association Party (FAP)	3,810	53.59
Lagisoa Delana	Soqosoqo ni Vakavulewa ni Taukei (SVT)	2,871	40.38
Ameo Liaci Ramokosoi	Nationalist Vanua Tako Lavo Party (NVTLP)	429	6.03
Total		7,110	100.00

=== 2001 ===
Candidate	Political party	Votes (primary)	%	Votes (final)	%
Irami Ului Matairavula	Soqosoqo Duavata ni Lewenivanua (SDL)	3,563	49.40	3,621	50.21
Levani Vaganalau Tuinabua	Conservative Alliance (CAMV)	1,965	27.25	2,353	32.63
Lepani Tagicakibau	Fijian Association Party (FAP)	340	4.71	3,244	10.34
Esira Rabuno	Independent	470	6.52	492	6.82
Sailosi Vodonaivalu Taka	Nationalist Vanua Tako Lavo Party (NVTLP)	385	5.34	...	...
Lagisoa Delana	Soqosoqo ni Vakavulewa ni Taukei (SVT)	336	4.66	...	...
Ilaijia Toroca	New Labour Unity Party (NLUP)	153	2.12	...	...
Total		7,846	100.00	7,846	100.00

=== 2006 ===
Candidate	Political party	Votes	%
Irami Ului Matairavula	Soqosoqo Duavata ni Lewenivanua (SDL)	6,722	80.59
Levani Tuinabua	Independent	1,046	12.57
Saukelea Ereni	National Alliance Party (NAPF)	493	5.93
Akuila Wailevu Raikoti	Independent	59	0.71
Total		8,320	100.00

== Sources ==
- Psephos - Adam Carr's electoral archive
- Fiji Facts
