= Felix Anthony =

Fiji Indian trade unionist and politician

Felix M. Anthony
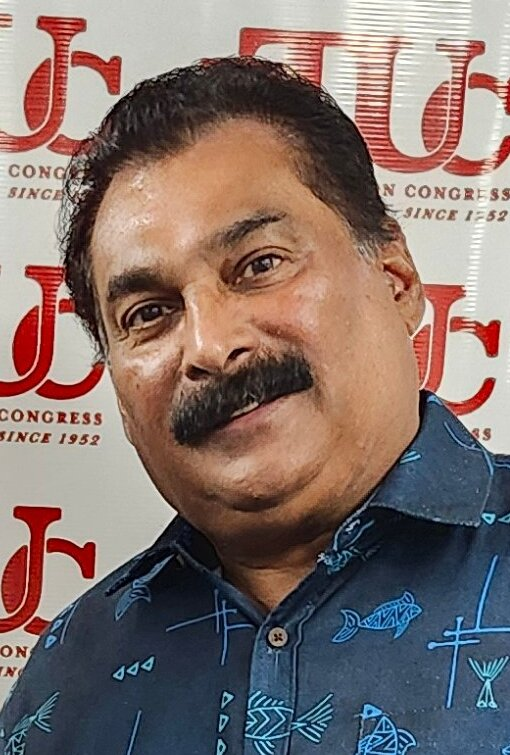

Member of Senate (Fiji) Leader of Opposition's Nominee
- In office 2002–2006

Member of House of Representatives (Fiji) Vuda Open Constituency
- In office 2006–2006
- Preceded by: Vijay Singh
- Succeeded by: vacant

Personal details
- Party: Fiji Labour Party
- Profession: Trade Unionist

Felix M. Anthony is a Fiji Indian trade unionist and politician.

During the 2000 coup, he was illegally detained by members of the Taukei Movement, an ethnic Fijian extremist organisation.

He was appointed to the Senate in 2002 as one of eight nominees of the Leader of the Opposition.

Anthony is National Secretary of the Fiji Trades Union Congress (FTUC). He was reelected as General Secretary of the Fiji Sugar and General Workers Union on 11 March 2006.

In the parliamentary election held on 6–13 May 2006, Anthony was elected to the House of Representatives seat, representing the Vuda Open Constituency for the Fiji Labour Party (FLP). After his election, he was involved in a dispute with the FLP leader, Mahendra Chaudhry, over the way in which Chaudhry had chosen his Senate nominees.

After the 2006 military coup by Frank Bainimarama, Anthony was appointed to the Board of Fiji National Provident Fund (FNPF) and the Board of Telecom Fiji.

As head of FTUC, Anthony helped establish the People's Democratic Party, and in May 2014 he was elected party leader. Following the PDP's failure to win any seats in the 2014 election, he stepped down as leader, and was replaced by Adi Sivia Qoro.

Trade union offices
Preceded by Govindasamy Rajasekaran	President of the ITUC-Asia Pacific; 2015–present	Succeeded by Incumbent
