= Sivia Qoro =

Fijian politician (1956–2026)

Adi Sivia Qoro (31 March 1956 – May 2026) was a Fijian chief and politician who served as a member of the House of Representatives for a short time in 2006. A member of the Fiji Labour Party, she represented the constituency of Yasawa Nawaka. In 2006, she served as the Minister for Commerce and the Minister for Industry in the multiparty cabinet of Prime Minister Laisenia Qarase.

In the 2014 elections (the first since the military coup of 2006), Qoro was a candidate for the People's Democratic Party (PDP). Following the election, in which the PDP failed to win any seats, party leader Felix Anthony resigned and Qoro was chosen to succeed him. She resigned from the party in November 2016.

Qoro died in May 2026, at the age of 70.
