= Cunningham (Open Constituency, Fiji) =

Former electoral constituency of Fiji

Cunningham Open is a former electoral division of Fiji, one of 25 open constituencies that were elected by universal suffrage (the remaining 46 seats, called communal constituencies, were allocated by ethnicity). Established by the 1997 Constitution, it came into being in 1999 and was used for the parliamentary elections of 1999, 2001, and 2006. It was located in the northern part of the greater Suva metropolitan area.

The 2013 Constitution promulgated by the Military-backed interim government abolished all constituencies and established a form of proportional representation, with the entire country voting as a single electorate.

== Election results ==
In the following tables, the primary vote refers to first-preference votes cast. The final vote refers to the final tally after votes for low-polling candidates have been progressively redistributed to other candidates according to pre-arranged electoral agreements (see electoral fusion), which may be customized by the voters (see instant run-off voting).

=== 1999 ===
Candidate	Political party	Votes (primary)	%	Votes (final)	%
Joeli Kalou	Fiji Labour Party (FLP)	4,926	43.95	6,741	60.14
Berenado Vunibobo	Soqosoqo ni Vakavulewa ni Taukei (SVT)	4,383	39.10	4,468	39.86
Saimoni Lutu	Christian Democratic Alliance (VLV)	1,561	13.93	...	...
Josaia Cucake	Fijian Association Party (FAP)	1,880	16.77	...	...
Sonai Nakuna	Nationalist Vanua Tako Lavo Party (NVTLP)	614	5.48	...	...
Vinod Lal	National Federation Party	41	0.37	...	...
Total		11,209	100.00	11,209	100.00

=== 2001 ===
Candidate	Political party	Votes (primary)	%	Votes (final)	%
Solomone Naivalu	Soqosoqo Duavata ni Lewenivanua (SDL)	5,110	41.60	6,902	56.19
Joeli Kalou	Fiji Labour Party (FLP)	4,021	32.73	5,382	43.81
Iliesa Naituku Sausauwai	Conservative Alliance (CAMV)	1,019	8.30	...	...
Jiuta Wakolo	New Labour Unity Party (NLUP)	849	6.89	...	...
Bijend Prasad Ram	National Federation Party (NFP)	543	4.42	...	...
Berenado Vunibobo	Soqosoqo ni Vakavulewa ni Taukei (SVT)	504	4.10	...	...
Lanieta Speight Naqasima	Fijian Association Party (FAP)	128	1.04	...	...
Romanu Naceva	Dodonu ni Taukei (DNT)	110	0.90	...	...
Total		12,284	100.00	12,284	100.00

=== 2006 ===
Candidate	Political party	Votes	%
Rajesh Singh	Soqosoqo Duavata ni Lewenivanua (SDL)	9,831	51.13
Ramesio Rogovakalali	Fiji Labour Party (FLP)	7,492	38.96
Leoni Tuisowaqa	National Alliance Party (NAPF)	659	3.43
Aminiasi Delana	Independent	536	2.79
Manuel Lui Arisais	National Federation Party (NFP)	428	2.23
Peni Vatubai	National Alliance Party (NAPF)	225	1.17
Joketani Delai	Social Liberty Party	49	0.25
Total		19,229	100.00

== Sources ==
- Psephos - Adam Carr's electoral archive
- Fiji Facts
