= Dhirendra Kumar =

Dhirendra Kumar, IFS

Personal details
- Born: 22 December 1954 (age 71)

Dhirendra Kumar is an Indian Forest Service Officer of 1983 batch. Born on 22 December 1954, he was a former Special Secretary, Industry Department cum Director of Sericulture, Handloom and Handicraft, Government of Jharkhand and Managing Director of Jharkhand Silk Textile and Handicraft Development Corporation (Jharcraft) Before Joining to the forest services, he did his Post Graduation in Geology from Ranchi University and then served as lecturer at St. Xavier’s College, Ranchi.

== Career ==
After Joining Indian Forest Service in 1983, he held many key positions in the Forest Department. In 2006, he was deputed to Industry Department, Govt. of Jharkhand as Special Secretary cum Director of Sericulture, Handloom and Handicraft. Then few months later, he was appointed as Managing Director of Jharkhand Silk, Textile and Handicraft development corporation Ltd (Jharcraft). He took charge when the activity of Sericulture, Handloom and Handicraft was dying in the state and the annual production of the sericulture in 2006-07 was only 90 metric ton. With his strong Endeavour and hard work, within a 5-year time frame the production of Tassar silk rose to 1025 metric ton, which was more than 10 times and thus Jharkhand has become the leading producer of Tassar Silk in the country and also got the Organic Certification in Tassar Silk. As the silk is cultivated in Arjun and Asan trees in the forest areas, his initiative has also become a major factor in forest conservation.

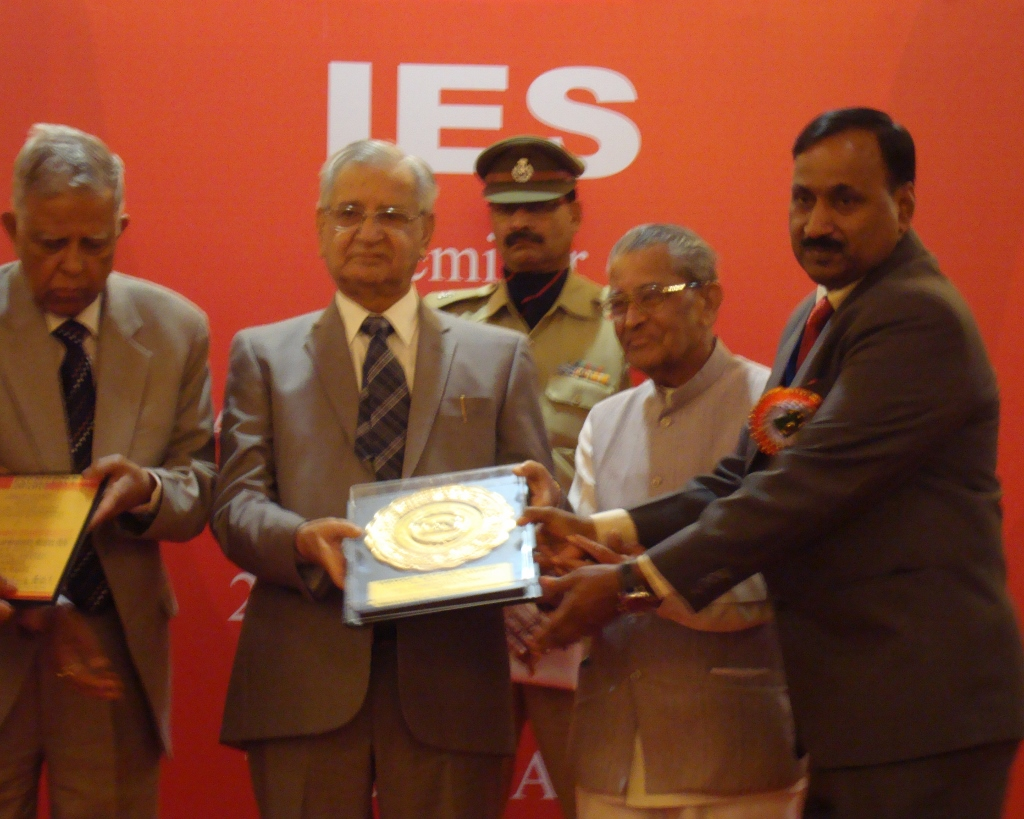
Dhirendra Kumar receiving award from Virendra Kataria, then Lieutenant Governor Puducherry, India.

He revived the handloom societies and formed many SHG but under his leadership, Jharcraft has given the livelihood training to more than 3.47 lac people which includes the training of the Sericulture, Handloom and Handicraft. He is also credited to revive the oldest form of casting by lost wax process, i.e. Dhokra Art and started the production centers of Leather accessories, Cane furniture, canvas Shoe, Painting and Apparel Units at jharkhand. He is an officer who does not take any police security while visiting the naxal affected area of Jharkhand. He has supported people in naxal areas of Jharkhand

For his achievement in the sector he was awarded Udyaog Ratna Award for the year 2014 from Institute of Economic Studies, New Delhi. and in same year he was awarded Rastriya Ratna Award and Bharat Excellence award by Friendship Forum at New Delhi.

== Post-retirement ==
After his retirement, Dhirendra Kumar was appointed as a consultant to the Ministry of Textiles, Government of India, for the period of 2015 to 2016. During this time, he developed a comprehensive and holistic project aimed at advancing sericulture and handloom industries in the northeastern region of India.

From 2016 to 2019, he served as a member of the Research Coordination Committee under the Ministry of Textiles, Government of India, contributing to the development of policies and strategies for these sectors.

In addition to his governmental work, Dhirendra Kumar founded Abhinav Silk Private Limited, based in Ranchi, with the vision of promoting sericulture and handloom industries across India, especially in Jharkhand. His significant contribution came in 2018, when he developed an innovative reeling machine, along with a process and technology, to produce high-grade reeled and twisted tasar yarn. This innovation, patented under his name, has helped reduce the country's reliance on imported Chinese yarn, creating valuable livelihood opportunities in rural areas, reducing migration to urban centers, and saving foreign exchange. Furthermore, sericulture has provided farmers with a reliable income, especially in drought years, offering an alternative source of livelihood.

Dhirendra Kumar also provided consultancy for a Belgium-based group to establish an export-oriented handloom unit in Ranchi, strengthening the region’s handloom industry and promoting international trade.

In 2024, Abhinav Silk Private Limited became an incubatee at the Atal Community Innovation Centre at IIT ISM Dhanbad, which has also become a stakeholder in the company.

In recognition of his remarkable contributions, Dhirendra Kumar was awarded the Lifetime Achievement Award by the Central Silk Board, Ministry of Textiles, Government of India, on 20 September 2024. He is the first person to receive this prestigious award for his efforts in promoting and developing Tasar Silk in India.

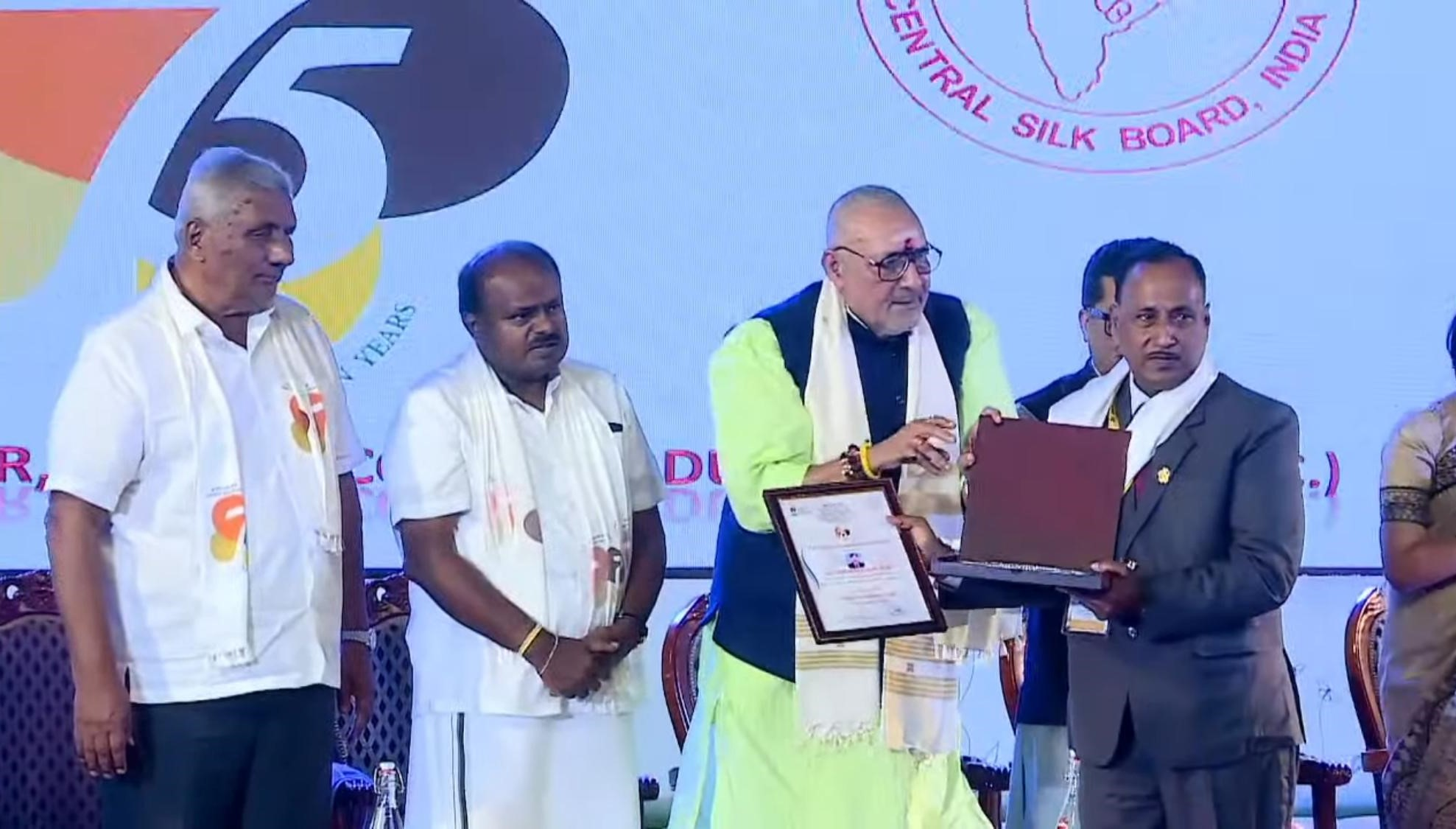
Dhirendra Kumar receiving Lifetime Achievement Award by Shri Giriraj Singh, Union Minister of Textile, Government of India at the Central Silk Board, Bangalore, on 20th September 2024.

His professional journey and achievements were documented in the coffee-table book " The Next Wave: Entrepreneurial Journeys from Idea to Impact on the Start Up Revolution in India" published by IIT ISM Dhanbad, highlighting his innovative contributions and impact on the sericulture and handloom industries.
