= Lomaivuna Namosi Kadavu (Open Constituency, Fiji) =

Former electoral constituency in Fiji

Lomaivuna Namosi Kadavu Open is a former electoral division of Fiji, one of 25 open constituencies that were elected by universal suffrage (the remaining 46 seats, called communal constituencies, were allocated by ethnicity). Established by the 1997 Constitution, it came into being in 1999 and was used for the parliamentary elections of 1999, 2001, and 2006. It covered the island of Kadavu and the southern part of the main island of Viti Levu.

The 2013 Constitution promulgated by the Military-backed interim government abolished all constituencies and established a form of proportional representation, with the entire country voting as a single electorate.

== Election results ==
In the following tables, the primary vote refers to first-preference votes cast. The final vote refers to the final tally after votes for low-polling candidates have been progressively redistributed to other candidates according to pre-arranged electoral agreements (see electoral fusion), which may be customized by the voters (see instant run-off voting).

In the 2001 election, Ted Young won with more than 50 percent of the primary vote; therefore, there was no redistribution of preferences.

=== 1999 ===
Candidate	Political party	Votes (primary)	%	Votes (final)	%
Konisi Yabaki	Soqosoqo ni Vakavulewa ni Taukei (SVT)	7,219	47.92	8,628	57.28
Ted Young	Fijian Association Party (FAP)	4,472	29.69	4,754	31.56
Vuli Meli Titoko	Christian Democratic Alliance (VLV)	1,428	9.48	1,682	11.17
Samu Konataci	Nationalist Vanua Tako Lavo Party (NVTLP)	1,260	8.36	...	...
Isikeli Nasoga	Independent	685	4.55	...	...
Total		15,064	100.00	15,064	100.00

=== 2001 ===
Candidate	Political party	Votes	%
Ted Young	Soqosoqo Duavata ni Lewenivanua (SDL)	8,761	64.95
Ratu Samuela Nawalowalo	Soqosoqo ni Vakavulewa ni Taukei (SVT)	4,728	35.05
Total		13,489	100.00

=== 2006 ===
Candidate	Political party	Votes	%
Ted Young	Soqosoqo Duavata ni Lewenivanua (SDL)	11,817	73.02
Mitieli Baleivanualala	Fiji Labour Party (FLP)	2,972	18.36
Peter Asiga Lee	Independent	1,395	8.62
Total		16,184	100.00

== Sources ==
- Psephos - Adam Carr's electoral archive
- Fiji Facts
