= Joji Banuve =

Fijian politician

Joji Natadra Banuve (1940 – 17 June 2009) was a Fijian politician, who served in the Cabinet as Assistant Minister for Local Government, Housing, Squatter Settlement, and the Environment. He also served as assistant minister of education. In the aforementioned roles, he assisted Colonel Pio Wong, who succeeded him in all of these portfolios.

Banuve's first foray into politics was in Fiji's 1999 general election, in which he unsuccessfully contested the Ra Open Constituency on behalf of the Christian Democratic Alliance (VLV). After the VLV disintegrated in 2001, in the wake of the coup d'état which deposed the government of Prime Minister Mahendra Chaudhry in May 2000, Banuve joined the newly formed Soqosoqo Duavata ni Lewenivanua (SDL) of Laisenia Qarase, and in the election held to restore democracy in September 2001, he won the North West Urban Fijian Communal Constituency for the SDL, and was subsequently appointed to the Cabinet.
