= North East Urban (Fijian Communal Constituency, Fiji) =

Former electoral constituency in Fiji

North East Fijian Urban Communal is a former electoral division of Fiji, one of 23 communal constituencies reserved for indigenous Fijians. Established by the 1997 Constitution, it came into being in 1999 and was used for the parliamentary elections of 1999, 2001, and 2006. (Of the remaining 48 seats, 23 were reserved for other ethnic communities and 25, called Open Constituencies, were elected by universal suffrage). The electorate was non-contiguous, covering the northern towns of Labasa and Savusavu.

The 2013 Constitution promulgated by the Military-backed interim government abolished all constituencies and established a form of proportional representation, with the entire country voting as a single electorate.

== Election results ==
In the following tables, the primary vote refers to first-preference votes cast. The final vote refers to the final tally after votes for low-polling candidates have been progressively redistributed to other candidates according to pre-arranged electoral agreements (see electoral fusion), which may be customized by the voters (see instant run-off voting).

=== 1999 ===
Candidate	Political party	Votes (primary)	%	Votes (final)	%
Isireli Leweniqila	Soqosoqo ni Vakavulewa ni Taukei (SVT)	3,812	37.44	5,418	53.22
Semi Seruvakula	Fijian Association Party (FAP)	2,693	26.45	2,718	26.69
Taniela Tabu	Christian Democratic Alliance (VLV)	2,032	19.96	2,046	20.09
Lasarusa Yehuda Ben-Zion Sovea	Nationalist Vanua Tako Lavo Party (NVTLP)	1,645	16.16	...	...
Total		10,182	100.00	10,182	100.00

=== 2001 ===
Candidate	Political party	Votes (primary)	%	Votes (final)	%
Filimone Banuve	Soqosoqo Duavata ni Lewenivanua (SDL)	4,460	45.26	5,298	53.76
Metuisela Mua	Conservative Alliance (CAMV)	1,904	19.32	2,122	21.53
Salote Raikolo Qalo	Soqosoqo ni Vakavulewa ni Taukei (SVT)	682	6.92	1,426	14.47
Timoci Gacece Naco	New Labour Unity Party (NLUP)	879	8.92	1,008	10.23
Sepesa Daunivalu	Soqosoqo Duavata ni Lewenivanua (SDL)	671	6.81	...	...
Eroni Ratuwalesi Bagasau Namakadre	Nationalist Vanua Tako Lavo Party (NVTLP)	460	4.67	...	...
Naipote Vere	Fiji Labour Party (FLP)	432	4.38	...	...
Netani Gucake	Party of National Unity (PANU)	276	2.80	...	...
Vilimaina Rakaseta	Conservative Alliance (CAMV)	90	0.91	...	...
Note that the SDL and the CAMV each fielded two candidates.
Total		9,854	100.00	9,854	100.00

=== 2006 ===
Candidate	Political party	Votes	%
Nanise Nagusuca	Soqosoqo Duavata ni Lewenivanua (SDL)	11,545	84.55
Sainiana Rokovucago	Fiji Labour Party (FLP)	1,357	9.93
Manasa Tugia	Independent	353	2.59
Saimoni Raikuna	National Alliance Party (NAPF)	338	2.45
Bogivitu Lotawa	Independent	61	0.45
Total		13,654	100.00

== Sources ==
- Psephos - Adam Carr's electoral archive
- Fiji Facts
