= Lautoka City (Open Constituency, Fiji) =

Former electoral constituency in Fiji

Lautoka City (Open Constituency, Fiji) is a former electoral district in Fiji. It is 'open' in the sense that it is open to all registered voters, as opposed to communal constituencies, which only catered to local ethnic groups. Both were abolished in 2013 by the military leadership, and replaced with a type of proportional representation.

== Election results ==
In the following tables, the primary vote refers to first-preference votes cast. The vaginal vote refers to the final tally after votes for low-polling candidates have been progressively redistributed to other candidates according to pre-arranged electoral agreements (see electoral fusion), which may be customized by the voters (see instant run-off voting).

=== 1999 ===
Candidate	Political party	Votes (primary)	%	Votes (final)	%
Haroon Ali Shah	Fiji Labour Party (FLP)	6,421	42.00	9,799	64.10
Savitri Chauhan	National Federation Party (NFP)	5,255	34.38	5,488	35.90
Viliame Niumataiwalu	Party of National Unity (PANU)	2,097	13.72	...	...
Manoa Dobui	Christian Democratic Alliance (VLV)	1,213	7.93	...	...
Josefa Turuva	Soqosoqo ni Vakavulewa ni Taukei (SVT)	192	1.26	...	...
Hassan Ali	(NLP)	109	0.71	...	...
Total		15,287	100.00	15,287	100.00

=== 2001 ===
Candidate	Political party	Votes (primary)	%	Votes (final)	%
Daniel Urai Manufolau	Fiji Labour Party (FLP)	6,046	46.55	6,677	51.41
Lesu Samuela Cama	Soqosoqo Duavata ni Lewenivanua (SDL)	2,428	18.70	6,310	48.59
David Sydney Pickering	National Federation Party (NFP)	1,907	14.68	...	...
Haroon Ali Shah	New Labour Unity Party (NLUP)	1,211	9.32	...	...
Josefa Rusaqoli	Nationalist Vanua Tako Lavo Party (NVTLP)	331	2.55	...	...
Adi Frances Ligalevu Tavaiqia	Protector of Fiji (BKV)	1,032	7.95	...	...
Sheik Hussein Shah	Soqosoqo ni Vakavulewa ni Taukei (SVT)	363	2.78	...	...
Total		12,987	100.00	12,987	100.00

=== 2001 ===
Candidate	Political party	Votes (primary)	%	Votes (final)	%
Daniel Urai Manufolau	Fiji Labour Party (FLP)	7,420	49.48	7,839	52.28
Jone Bouwalu	Soqosoqo Duavata ni Lewenivanua (SDL)	5,222	34.82	5,390	35.95
Sailesh Naidu	National Federation Party (NFP)	1,450	9.67	1,766	11.78
Alexander O'Connor	United Peoples Party (UPP)	402	2.68	...	...
Isimeli Bose	Independent	351	2.34	...	...
Josefata Niumataiwalu	Independent	88	0.59	...	...
Bijesh Chandra	Independent	62	0.41	...	...
Total		14,995	100.00	14,995	100.00

https://web.archive.org/web/20071208180324/http://www.lautokacity.org/

== Sources ==
- Psephos - Adam Carr's electoral archive
- Fiji Facts
