= Viti Levu South Kadavu (Indian Communal Constituency, Fiji) =

Former electoral constituency in Fiji

Viti Levu South Kadavu Indian Communal is a former electoral division of Fiji, one of 19 communal constituencies reserved for Indo-Fijians. Established by the 1997 Constitution, it came into being in 1999 and was used for the parliamentary elections of 1999, 2001, and 2006. (Of the remaining 52 seats, 27 were reserved for other ethnic communities and 25, called Open Constituencies, were elected by universal suffrage). The electorate covered southern areas of the main island of Viti Levu, as well as Kadavu and its outliers.

The 2013 Constitution promulgated by the Military-backed interim government abolished all constituencies and established a form of proportional representation, with the entire country voting as a single electorate.

== Election results ==
In the following tables, the primary vote refers to first-preference votes cast. The final vote refers to the final tally after votes for low-polling candidates have been progressively redistributed to other candidates according to pre-arranged electoral agreements (see electoral fusion), which may be customized by the voters (see instant run-off voting).

=== 1999 ===
Candidate	Political party	Votes	%
Prince Gopal Lakshman	Fiji Labour Party (FLP)	3,992	63.83
Mann Singh	National Federation Party (NFP)	2,262	36.17
Total		6,254	100.00

=== 2001 ===
Candidate	Political party	Votes	%
Prince Gopal Lakshman	Fiji Labour Party (FLP)	4,113	73.54
Dhirendra Singh	National Federation Party (NFP)	1,285	22.98
Prasad Ishwari	New Labour Unity Party (NLUP)	195	3.46
Total		5,593	100.00

=== 2006 ===
Candidate	Political party	Votes	%
Chaitanya Lakshman	Fiji Labour Party (FLP)	5,575	81.99
Bimal Bimlesh Prasad	National Federation Party (NFP)	877	12.90
Bimal Singh	Soqosoqo Duavata ni Lewenivanua (SDL)	205	3.01
Pravin Narayan	National Alliance Party	143	2.10
Total		6,800	100.00

== Sources ==
- Psephos - Adam Carr's electoral archive
- Fiji Facts
