= Vuda (Indian Communal Constituency, Fiji) =

Former electoral constituency in Fiji

Vuda East Maritime Indian Communal is a former electoral division of Fiji, one of 19 communal constituencies reserved for Indo-Fijians. Established by the 1997 Constitution, it came into being in 1999 and was used for the parliamentary elections of 1999, 2001, and 2006. (Of the remaining 52 seats, 27 were reserved for other ethnic communities and 25, called Open Constituencies, were elected by universal suffrage). The electorate covered part of Ba Province, in the western part of the main island of Viti Levu.

The 2013 Constitution promulgated by the Military-backed interim government abolished all constituencies and established a form of proportional representation, with the entire country voting as a single electorate.

== Election results ==
In the following tables, the primary vote refers to first-preference votes cast. The final vote refers to the final tally after votes for low-polling candidates have been progressively redistributed to other candidates according to pre-arranged electoral agreements (see electoral fusion), which may be customized by the voters (see instant run-off voting).

=== 1999 ===
Candidate	Political party	Votes	%
Vinod Chandra Deo Maharaj	Fiji Labour Party (FLP)	6,936	73.09
Swani Kumar Maharaj	National Federation Party (NFP)	2,352	24.79
Bissun Datt	Independent	201	2.12
Total		9,489	100.00

=== 2001 ===
Candidate	Political party	Votes	%
Vyas Deo Sharma	Fiji Labour Party (FLP)	6,310	79.76
Ramaswamy Ponnu Swamy Goundar	National Federation Party (NFP)	1,383	17.48
Vinod Chandra Deo Maharaj	New Labour Unity Party (NLUP)	218	2.76
Total		7,911	100.00

=== 2006 ===
Candidate	Political party	Votes	%
Vyas Deo Sharma	Fiji Labour Party (FLP)	7,131	85.12
Rajendra Singh	National Federation Party (NFP)	748	8.93
Abdul Afizu Rahiman	Soqosoqo Duavata ni Lewenivanua (SDL)	330	3.94
Sanel Prasad	National Alliance Party (NAPF)	155	1.84
Arbin Prakash Narayan	Independent	14	0.17
Total		8,378	100.00

== Sources ==
- Psephos - Adam Carr's electoral archive
- Fiji Facts
