= Lekh Ram Vayeshnoi =

Fijian politician

Member of House of Representatives (Fiji) Nadroga Indian Communal Constituency
- In office 1992–2009

Assistant Minister in Prime Minister's Office (Responsible for Information) (Fiji)
- In office May 1999 – May 2000

Minister for Energy and Mineral Resources (Fiji)
- In office May 2006 – December 2006

Minister for Youth, Sports, Employment Opportunities and Productivity (Fiji)
- In office January 2007 – December 2007

Minister for Labour, Industrial Relations, Employment, Local Government, Urban Development, Housing and Environment.
- In office January 2008 – August 2008

Personal details
- Party: Fiji Labour Party

Lekh Ram Vayeshnoi, is a Fijian politician of Indian descent. He was one of the youngest members to be elected into Parliament in 1992. He has represented the Nadroga Indian Communal Constituency, which he won for the Fiji Labour Party (FLP) in the parliamentary elections of 1992, 1994, 1999, 2001, and 2006. After the 1999 election he was appointed Assistant Minister in Prime Minister's Office. He was appointed Minister for Youth and Sports and Employment Opportunities in the interim administration that followed the military coup that took place on 5 December 2006. He was born to a family of Rajasthani descent.

On 19 May 2000, he was among the 43 members of the People's Coalition Government, led by Mahendra Chaudhry, taken hostage by George Speight and his band of rebel Republic of Fiji Military Forces (RFMF) soldiers from the Counter Revolutionary Warfare Unit. He was released on 21 May 2000, after he signed a paper resigning his seat in Parliament.

Vayeshnoi supported the Military in its public disagreements with the Fijian government throughout 2005. He condemned the surcharge of more than F$49,000 levied in 2005 against Commodore Frank Bainimarama, the Military Commander, for blowing his budget in 2003.

In May 2006 Vayeshnoi became Minister for Energy and Mineral Resources in the new multi-party Cabinet appointed following the general election held on 6–13 May, but soon attracted media attention again with a parliamentary speech on 12 June calling for the shelving of certain policies promoted by his own government. Prime Minister Laisenia Qarase of the rival Soqosoqo Duavata ni Lewenivanua (SDL) Party threatened to take disciplinary action against him, and some of his own FLP colleagues, including party president Perumal Mupnar, appeared embarrassed by his remarks. FLP deputy leader and fellow-Cabinet Minister Poseci Bune also reprimanded him, according to Fiji Television.

Following the military coup that took place on 5 December 2006, Bainimarama appointed Vayeshnoi to the interim Cabinet on 9 January 2007.
