= People's Democratic Party (Fiji) =

The People's Democratic Party was a political party in Fiji.

The party was proposed in January 2013 by the Fiji Trades Union Congress as a vehicle to promote the interests of workers and unions. Shortly afterwards, the Fijian regime promulgated new regulations governing the registration of political parties, which included a ban on participation by union officials. The party applied for registration in April 2013. Registration was approved on 29 May 2013.

In May 2014 former trade union leader Felix Anthony was elected leader of the party, with lawyer and prominent regime critic Aman Ravindra Singh as Secretary General and Lynda Tabuya as party president. Anthony stepped down as leader following the PDP's failure to win any seats in the 2014 election, and was replaced by Adi Sivia Qoro, while Ravindra-Singh defected to the FLP in 2017. Qoro resigned from the party in November 2016, and the board unanimously elected Tabuya as party leader on 1 March 2017.

In December 2017 the party announced an alliance with the Conservative SODELPA to run candidates on its list in 2018 parliamentary election, motivating this with practical reasons as the party didn't think it could enter parliament on its own. The party was subsequently suspended by the supervisor of elections.

The party was de-registered in November 2018 for failing to submit its required statement of assets and liabilities.
