= Konisi Yabaki =

Fijian politician

Konisi Tabu Yabaki was a Fijian politician from the southern Kadavu Island. He served in the Cabinet from 2000 to 2006, but lost his portfolios as Minister for Fisheries and Forests after the parliamentary election of 6–13 May 2006. He was subsequently appointed Chairman of the parliamentary committee on Social Services.

== Political career ==
Yabaki won the Lomaivuna Namosi Kadavu Open Constituency for the Soqosoqo ni Vakavulewa ni Taukei (SVT) at the 1999 election. He was appointed Minister for Tourism and Transport in the interim government that was formed in July 2000 the wake of the failed Fiji coup of 2000, which deposed the elected government of Prime Minister Mahendra Chaudhry before being quashed by the Military. In the election held to restore democracy in September 2001, he won the Kadavu Fijian Communal Constituency for the Soqosoqo Duavata ni Lewenivanua (SDL), defeating James Ah Koy, who had held the seat for many years, and was subsequently appointed Minister for Forests and Fisheries.

Yabaki's political career was ended by the military coup of 2006.
