= Rajesh Singh (politician) =

Member of House of Cunningham Neighbourhood
- In office 2006–2006
- Preceded by: Solomone Naivalu
- Succeeded by: vacant

Personal details
- Born: 11 October 1954 (age 71)
- Party: Soqosoqo Duavata ni Lewenivanua (SDL)
- Profession: Sports Admin Officer

Rajesh Singh is a Fijian of Indian descent who briefly held Cabinet office in mid-2006 before being dismissed by then Prime Minister Laisenia Qarase for allegedly failing to follow instructions and directives and for failing to work effectively with Cabinet.

== Career ==
Singh was one of only two Indo-Fijians elected on the ticket of the ruling Soqosoqo Duavata ni Lewenivanua (SDL) Party of Prime Minister Laisenia Qarase, when he won the Cunningham Open Constituency at the Parliamentary election held on 6–13 March 2006.

Soon after the 2006 election, Singh was appointed Administration Officer for Youth and Sports. In this role he was subordinate to Ro Teimumu Kepa, with whom his working relationship was tense. Fiji Television reported on 28 September that Kepa had written to the Prime Minister a week earlier, claiming that Singh was failing to cooperate with her.

Singh was dismissed from Cabinet by Prime Minister Laisenia Qarase, who terminated his ministerial appointment. Singh said that he was not informed of his dismissal and first learned of it through the media. He told the ‘‘Daily Post’’ that while he was not surprised by Qarase’s decision to dismiss him, he considered the manner in which the dismissal was handled to be unfair, accusing the Prime Minister of having “stabbed him in the back”.

Following the military coup which deposed the Qarase government on 5 December 2006, Singh declared his willingness to cooperate with the new regime. Fiji Live quoted him on 17 December as saying that he supported the stated intention of the Military to purge corruption and irregularities from the government and bureaucracy. Nevertheless, despite distancing himself from the deposed government and expressing support for the military's stated objectives, Singh was subsequently dismissed by Frank Bainimarama.

On 26 May 2007 Singh told Fiji television that he had resigned from the SDL and wished to contest the next election, but not for his former party.
