= Dewan Chand =

Fijian politician

Member of the Fijian Parliament for Laucala Indian
- In office 13 May 2006 – 5 December 2006
- Preceded by: Kamlesh Kumar Arya
- Succeeded by: None (Parliament disestablished)

Personal details
- Party: Fiji Labour Party
- Profession: Teacher, Trade Unionist

Dewan Chand is an Indo-Fijian educationist and politician.

== Work ==
Chand had been a secondary school principal, and an active member of the Fiji Teachers Union before joining politics. He was elected to Parliament as a Fiji Labour Party candidate in the 2006 Fijian general election, winning 90% of the votes cast in the Laucala Indian Communal Constituency. He lost his seat when parliament was dissolved following the 2006 Fijian coup d'état.

In October 2009, he was re-elected the northern vice president of Fiji Football Association.

== Controversy ==
In September 2012 he was convicted on indecent assault and defiling a girl under the age of 13 and sentenced to four years imprisonment. The conviction was upheld on appeal. He was subsequently sacked from the Fiji Football Association.
