= Kamlesh Reddy =

Fijian politician

Kamlesh Reddy is a Fiji Indian politician who won the Labasa Indian Communal Constituency for the Labour Party in 2006 general election.
