= North West Urban (Fijian Communal Constituency, Fiji) =

Former electoral constituency in Fiji

North West Fijian Urban Communal is a former electoral division of Fiji, one of 23 communal constituencies reserved for indigenous Fijians. Established by the 1997 Constitution, it came into being in 1999 and was used for the parliamentary elections of 1999, 2001, and 2006. (Of the remaining 48 seats, 23 were reserved for other ethnic communities and 25, called Open Constituencies, were elected by universal suffrage).

The 2013 Constitution promulgated by the Military-backed interim government abolished all constituencies and established a form of proportional representation, with the entire country voting as a single electorate.

== Election results ==
In the following tables, the primary vote refers to first-preference votes cast. The final vote refers to the final tally after votes for low-polling candidates have been progressively redistributed to other candidates according to pre-arranged electoral agreements (see electoral fusion), which may be customized by the voters (see instant run-off voting).

=== 1999 ===
Candidate	Political party	Votes (primary)	%	Votes (final)	%
Akanisi Lagilagikobau Koroitamana	Party of National Unity (PANU)	5,320	43.10	8,297	67.23
Vilisoni Cagimaivei	Soqosoqo ni Vakavulewa ni Taukei (SVT)	3,869	31.35	4,045	32.77
Kitione Vuataki	Christian Democratic Alliance (VLV)	2,435	19.73	...	...
Navitalai Ratukalou	Nationalist Vanua Tako Lavo Party (NVTLP)	652	5.28	...	...
Divuki Miliakere Ah Tong	Fijian Association Party (FAP)	66	0.53	...	...
Total		12,342	100.00	12,342	100.00

=== 2001 ===
Candidate	Political party	Votes (primary)	%	Votes (final)	%
Joji Banuve	Soqosoqo Duavata ni Lewenivanua (SDL)	4,929	45.94	7,339	68.40
Panipasa Matailevu	Soqosoqo ni Vakavulewa ni Taukei (SVT)	1,815	16.92	3,391	31.60
Akanisi Lagilagikobau Koroitamana	Protector of Fiji (BKV)	1,403	13.08	...	...
Eroni Lewaqai	Conservative Alliance (CAMV)	1,121	10.45	...	...
Remesio Rogovakalali	Fiji Labour Party (FLP)	1,043	9.72	...	...
Viliame Bogisa Panu	Independent	419	3.90	...	...
Total		10,730	100.00	10,730	100.00

=== 2006 ===
Candidate	Political party	Votes	%
Joji Natadra Banuve	Soqosoqo Duavata ni Lewenivanua (SDL)	11,620	79.04
Akanisi Koroitamana	Fiji Labour Party (FLP)	2,017	13.72
Ravuama Rainima Nanovu	Independent	477	3.24
Lemeki Vuetaki	National Alliance Party (NAPF)	283	1.93
Ratu Maikeli Lalabalavu	National Federation Party (NFP)	158	1.07
Vuli Salusalu Mahe	United Peoples Party (UPP)	115	0.78
Mosese Tukikaukamea	Independent	31	0.21
Total		14,701	100.00

== Sources ==
- Psephos - Adam Carr's electoral archive
- Fiji Facts
