= Tavua (Indian Communal Constituency, Fiji) =

Former electoral constituency in Fiji

Tavua Indian Communal is a former electoral division of Fiji, one of 19 communal constituencies reserved for Indo-Fijians. Established by the 1997 Constitution, it came into being in 1999 and was used for the parliamentary elections of 1999, 2001, and 2006. (Of the remaining 52 seats, 27 were reserved for other ethnic communities and 25, called Open Constituencies, were elected by universal suffrage). The electorate was located in the west of the main island of Viti Levu.

The 2013 Constitution promulgated by the Military-backed interim government abolished all constituencies and established a form of proportional representation, with the entire country voting as a single electorate.

== Election results ==
In the following tables, the primary vote refers to first-preference votes cast. The final vote refers to the final tally after votes for low-polling candidates have been progressively redistributed to other candidates according to pre-arranged electoral agreements (see electoral fusion), which may be customized by the voters (see instant run-off voting).

=== 1999 ===
| Candidate | Political party | Votes | % |
| Anand Babla | Fiji Labour Party (FLP) | 5,463 | 75.43 |
| Narendra Reddy | National Federation Party (NFP) | 1,779 | 24.57 |
| Total | | 7,242 | 100.00 |

=== 2001 ===
| Candidate | Political party | Votes | % |
| Anand Babla | Fiji Labour Party (FLP) | 5,500 | 76.19 |
| Moti Chand | National Federation Party (NFP) | 1,443 | 19.99 |
| Rameshwar Lal | New Labour Unity Party (NLUP) | 276 | 3.82 |
| Total | | 7,219 | 100.00 |

=== 2006 ===
| Candidate | Political party | Votes | % |
| Anand Babla | Fiji Labour Party (FLP) | 5,707 | 79.48 |
| Suresh Chandra | National Federation Party (NFP) | 1,329 | 18.51 |
| Mohammed Janif Khan | Soqosoqo Duavata ni Lewenivanua (SDL) | 144 | 2.01 |
| Total | | 7,180 | 100.00 |

== Sources ==
- Psephos - Adam Carr's electoral archive
- Fiji Facts
