= George Shiu Raj =

Fijian politician

George Shiu Raj is a Fijian former politician, businessman, and cane farmer. He served as Minister for Multi-Ethnic Affairs in the Republic of Fiji, holding office from 2001 to 30 September 2004, when he resigned amid accusations of misuse of funds. At the time, he was the only Indo-Fijian minister in the Cabinet of Prime Minister Laisenia Qarase. On 8 September 2005, he was acquitted of charges of conspiracy to defraud the government and of obtaining money under false pretenses, and Prime Minister Qarase announced his decision to reappoint Raj to the Cabinet. He was duly sworn in by Vice-President Ratu Joni Madraiwiwi on 13 September.

Following the parliamentary election held between 6 and 13 May 2006, in which Raj retained his seat with a large majority, Prime Minister Qarase appointed him Minister for Women, Social Welfare, and Poverty Alleviation. This appointment was harshly criticised by Fiji Labour Party leader Mahendra Chaudhry. In a parliamentary debate on 8 June 2006, Chaudhry called the appointment of a male to head the Ministry for Women an "act of violence" against women, and called on Raj to resign.
