= Justice and Freedom Party =

Political party in Fiji

The Justice and Freedom Party (JFP) was a minor political party in Fiji. It was formed in 2000 to promote the interests of the Indo-Fijian community, and unsuccessfully contested the 2001 and 2006 elections. It was dissolved in 2013.

In the 2001 election the party gained less than 0.1 percent of the popular vote and won no constituencies. With some 76 percent of Indo-Fijians voting for the Fiji Labour Party and 22 percent for the National Federation Party, the JFP was squeezed out.

In the 2006 elections, the party intended to run candidates in all 19 communal constituencies allocated to Indo-Fijians, and on 3 April published a manifesto promising to petition the Commonwealth of Nations and the United Nations to press the United Kingdom and Australia to accept responsibility for bringing Indians to Fiji during the colonial era. It also promised a F$10 million scholarship for Indo-Fijian students. The party would also push for dual citizenship to be allowed for Indo-Fijians living in Australia and the United Kingdom, and for British passports to be restored to Indo-Fijians living in Fiji, JFP General Secretary Dildar Shah said. On 7 April, however, it was announced that the JFP had decided to merge with the multiracial National Alliance Party of Fiji under the leadership of Ratu Epeli Ganilau. Some JFP members, including Shah, would contest the forthcoming election on 6–13 May for the Alliance, Ganilau said. However, it did subsequently contest the election, gaining only 18 votes.

In 2006 the Fijian government was overthrown and the Fijian parliament dissolved in a coup. In January 2013 the military regime promulgated new regulations governing the registration of political parties, requiring all parties to have at least 5,000 members. The JFP welcomed the new regulations but was unable to gain the required number of members. it was therefore wound up and its assets forfeited to the state.
