= Fijian military unrest in 2006 =

A series of events took place in the Pacific republic of Fiji in 2006, involving a public feud between the government and military. Tensions took a dramatic turn for the worse on 11–13 January, with reports of unusual troop and naval deployments, crisis meetings of the National Security Council, and the erection of police roadblocks. Rumours also swept the capital that the Military Commander, Commodore Frank Bainimarama, had been arrested by the police on government orders, but the Military denied this. The crisis came to a head on the 13th, with Bainimarama announcing that he had dismissed the Acting Land Force Commander, Lieutenant Colonel Jone Baledrokadroka for insubordination. This event was a precursor to the military coup that finally took place on 5 December 2006.

The Republic of Fiji Military Forces suffered serious and deep divisions when a faction of elite soldiers helped stage a coup on May 19, 2000 and later led a bloody mutiny attempt on November 2 the same year.

The target of the failed mutiny, which left five rebel and three loyalist soldiers dead, was the commander of the RFMF Commodore Voreqe (Frank) Bainimarama. The mutiny left Bainimarama shaken and deeply suspicious of any of his officer coups who contradicted him.

In the years that followed there were several low-key internal differences in the RFMF over Bainimarama's continued public standoff with the government of Laisenia Qarase. By January 2006, these differences were beginning to spill out into the public domain, most notably with the confrontation between Bainimarama and his second-in-command Lieutenant-Colonel Jone Baledrokadroka over the ongoing public feud.

== Overview ==
At first it seemed the military was moving to take over the government between January 11–13, with unusual troop and naval deployments around the capital. Military establishments were barricaded and rumours spread that the military was preparing to seize power. Rumours also swept the capital that the Military Commander, Commodore Frank Bainimarama, had been arrested by the police on government orders, but the military denied this.

In response the government called crisis meetings of the National Security Council and police checkpoints were set up. It was an internal military crisis that began a national concern because for months previously the army's top brass had been hinting at a takeover. The crisis came to a head on the 13th, with Bainimarama announcing that he had dismissed the Acting Land Force Commander, Lieutenant Colonel Jone Baledrokadroka for insubordination.

Baledrokadroka later said he had confronted Bainimarama about his continued standoff with the government and had tried to persuade him not to stage a coup. Bainimarama, for his part, accused Baledrokadroka of threatening to stage a mutiny.

== The Queen Elizabeth Barracks crisis ==
On the afternoon of the 12th, Prime Minister Laisenia Qarase called an emergency meeting of the National Security Council, following reports of a "serious situation" at the Queen Elizabeth Barracks earlier in the day. Police Commissioner Andrew Hughes was summoned to the meeting, after which the Prime Minister, accompanied by more than the usual number of body guards, told reporters that the security situation was "under control", and appealed for calm.

The situation at the barracks was said to involve a group of Army officers, led by Lieutenant Colonel Jone Baledrokadroka, Bainimarama's second in command, confronting the Commander about his anti-government statements. This was rumoured to have been followed by a meeting between Bainimarama and other officers, in which he was said to have solicited their support. The Fiji Live news service reported that senior officer Colonel Meli Saubulinayau was subsequently called in to mediate between the two factions, and was said to have defused the tension. Military spokesman Captain Neumi Leweni denied the rumours, claiming that no unscheduled meetings had taken place. However, the gates to the camp were closed and guarded by armed military police, an unusual move.

Captain Leweni denied reports that Commodore Bainimarama had been arrested, and said that he remained in charge of the Military. This was confirmed by Bainimarama himself when he appeared in public at a rugby union training session at Albert Park that evening. There was no instability in the barracks, he insisted. "All the rumours that are going around regarding the meeting and my arrest are all false. None of it is true," Fiji Live quoted him as saying. He insisted that the meetings held that day had been "normal procedure", asking rhetorically, "Would I be here if there was instability between my senior officers and me?" He denied rumours that two senior officers alleged to have confronted him had been detained in a cell at the Nabua barracks on his orders. There was nothing sinister about the closing of the barracks gates, he said. He had been at dinner at the time and had ordered the gates to be closed because he had not wanted to be bothered talking the media, who were outside, he claimed.

== Naval and police deployments ==
Unusual naval movements were also reported. In what the Navy described as an exercise to test the ability of its fleet to react to emergencies, three vessels were sent out into Suva Harbour and kept watch over Government House. The naval headquarters was also placed under guard. Naval spokesman Lieutenant Commander Bradley Bower later claimed that the navy had only been conducting "normal routine exercises."

By nightfall, police roadblocks were going up around Suva, ostensibly to maintain law and order. The Police Tactical Response Unit, established to respond quickly to emergencies, was also put on special alert, the Fiji Times reported the next day. Police spokesmen Lemeki Ravai and Jahir Khan denied that the roadblocks were connected with the crisis, however. They were part of Operation Sasamaki, they claimed - a crackdown on road offenders and petty criminals.

There were also reports of increased security at Nadi International Airport.

It was announced that Home Affairs Minister Josefa Vosanibola would meet Acting President Ratu Joni Madraiwiwi the next morning to discuss the outcome of Madraiwiwi's talks with the Commander earlier in the week. The meeting would decide what disciplinary action, if any, would be taken against the Commander for his frequent outbursts against government policies, it was said. Various news outlets produced conflicting quotes from Commodore Bainimarama, on whether he had, or had not, met with Madraiwiwi on the 11th. On the afternoon of the 12th, however, he told the Fiji Village news service that the meeting had in fact taken place, but declined to reveal any details about what had been discussed.

== The dismissal of Lieutenant Colonel Baledrokadroka ==
Fiji Live reported that Commodore Bainimarama had dismissed Baleidrokadroka from his position of Land Force Commander, in the wake of the previous day's altercation. The dismissal was confirmed by Military spokesman Captain Neumi Leweni and by Baleidrokadroka himself, who told Fiji Television that he was on leave, pending resignation. Bainimarama himself had taken over the command in person, it was reported. On 15 January, he told a press conference that two new Chiefs of Staff - Colonel Pita Driti as Chief of Staff Land Force, based at Suva's Queen Elizabeth Barracks, and Captain Esala Teleni as Chief of Staff Strategic Headquarters in central Suva.

New Zealand's The Sunday Star-Times newspaper reported on 15 January that Baledrokadroka was the brother of Senator Adi Lagamu Vuiyasawa, the common-law wife of Ratu Inoke Takiveikata, the Qaranivalu (Paramount Chief) of Naitasiri, who has been convicted and imprisoned for his role in the mutiny of 2 November 2000. The Sunday Star-Times considered this detail important, and noted that all of Fiji's newspapers had omitted to mention it.

=== Baledrokadroka's version ===
Baledrokadroka told the Fiji Times on the 14th that he had resigned rather than obey a "treasonous" order of Bainimarama's. "I asked the commander for his resignation on the grounds that it was perfectly clear that he was going to commit treason," he told the Fiji Times. In a further statement the next day, he clarified that at a meeting of senior officers on the 9th, Bainimarama had hinted that he might be arrested and instructed them to come and free him in such an event. He denied claims by unnamed army sources that he had tried to stage a mutiny. "I am a professional soldier and I would not dream of such a thing," he said emphatically.

He told Fiji Live the next day that the crisis for him had begun when he had told a colleagues at a meeting of Commissioned Senior Officers that he was opposed to the Commander's recent antigovernment pronouncements. His motive for opposing the Commander was professional, not political, he claimed, and emphasized that he would not change his stand.

Speaking to the Fiji Sun on the 14th, Baleidrokadroka condemned the Commander for accusing him of threatening to shoot him. "He has lied and he knows that he is lying," Baledrokadroka declared. "... I absolutely deny that I threatened violence against the Commander and I’m deeply shocked at the allegations."

On the 16th, Baledrokadroka denied claims made by the Fiji Labour Party and by Commodore Bainimarama himself that he had colluded with Prime Minister Qarase in an attempt to depose the Commander. "They (the FLP) are still sort of hanging on to that, the victim thesis that they have been the victim of coups in the past and its only fair in their eyes that the Commander do something, whatever it is. At the moment it looks to be extra constitutional," he told Fiji Television. He further claimed that Bainimarama had attempted to trick him into executing a coup. The second paragraph of an order handed to him on 8 January seemed "sinister", he said, and claimed "legal experts" (whom he did not name) concurred with his opinion that it was tantamount to a coup plot.

=== Bainimarama's version ===
Fiji Village reported on 14 January that at a press conference held that afternoon, Commodore Bainimarama said that Baleidrokadroka had been dismissed for insubordination and for failing the loyalty test of the Military. The command which Baleidrokadroka had refused to obey had been only a test, which he had failed miserably, the Commander claimed. He had been willing to give Baleidrokadroka another chance, he said, but Baleidrokadroka had made matters worse by talking to the media. Baleidrokadroka's dismissal would be a lesson to other potential insubordinates, he said. The message was clear that any acts of insubordination would be dealt with quickly and decisively. "Now soldiers know what will happen if they support JB," Fiji Live reported him as saying. "Obedience is paramount in the army."

Bainimarama was joined by Military spokesman Captain Neumi Leweni, who revealed that Military Police were now investigating the circumstances surrounding the barracks crisis that led to Baleidrokadroka's resignation, and a Board of Inquiry had been set up. On 16 January, Lieutenant Colonel Etueni Caucau, Bainimarama's legal adviser, told Fiji Live that an inquiry was necessary to prevent a repeat of the 2000 mutiny. A number of "borderline officers" had been identified whose loyalty would be investigated, Caucau said.

Caucau had earlier told Fiji Live on the 14th that Baleidrokadroka had "threatened" the Commander and had been confined to his office by other senior officers to prevent him from carrying out his threat. Baleidrokadroka's claim to have outside support, and his alleged attempts to elicit support from soldiers, was what had prompted the closing and guarding of the barracks' gates, Caucau added.

The Fiji Times quoted Bainimarama on the 16th as saying that Baleidrokadroka had threatened shoot him not once but twice. "First was on Thursday when I called him on the mobile. He said he was going to shoot me and then again on Friday when I met him face-to-face," he told the Times. "I have a witness to that account." He said he was going to present his "evidence" that Baleidrokadroka had wconspired with senior government officials to plot against him.

Acting President Madraiwiwi held separate meetings with Bainimarama and Prime Minister Qarase. Home Affairs Minister Josefa Vosanibola was present at the latter meeting, at which it was agreed that the Acting President, Prime Minister, and Military Commander would meet on the morning of 16 January (Monday). Increased security around Government House, the President's official residence, was evident. Appealing for calm, the Prime Minister reiterated earlier assurances that there was no threat to stability.

=== Suva calm, but ... ===
Police Commissioner Andrew Hughes announced that police officers were resuming "normal duties," following a personal assurance from Commodore Bainimarama that there was no threat to national security. The national security alert had been unnecessary and the rumours sweeping the nation had been "media generated," he considered. He also denied rumours that weapons recently purchased by the police were to counter the Military should the need arise. "They are not in any sense part of a program initiated by government by me or by anybody else to equip the police to somehow ... counter any military threat," he insisted. "There is no way the police are gearing up to take on that role."

=== Investigation ===
Two separate but parallel investigations, one conducted by the Military and one by the civil service, were launched into the incident.

==== The Military investigation ====
Captain Neumi Leweni, a spokesman for the Fijian Military, announced on 20 January that four senior army officers had been appointed the day before to investigate the alleged mutiny plot. The four officers would not be named until they had completed their work, Leweni said.

The Board of Inquiry met for the first time on 25 January at Queen Elizabeth Barracks. Leweni said that meetings would continue throughout the week, but could not set out a time frame for the investigations. Commodore Bainimarama confirmed that he had been summoned to appear before the board on the 27th, but Baledrokadroka had not been summoned, according to his lawyer, Devanesh Sharma.

Leweni said that several senior officers had been implicated in the plot.

Fiji Television revealed on 30 January that Baledrokadroka had been summoned, but that Leweni said that a letter had been received from Baledrokadroka's lawyers seeking clarification on the membership and proceedings of the Board of Inquiry.

Home Affairs Chief Executive Officer Lesi Korovavala was also summoned, but refused, citing his workload. The Military was displeased by his refusal, Leweni said.

Lawyer Sharma said on 1 February that Baledrokadroka was willing to testify, but only if certain issues were clarified. Sharma cited the constitutional rights of defendants not to testify against themselves. Baledrokadroka finally did appear before the board on 2 February, after his constitutional rights had been clarified by lawyers. He handed over a written statement; neither he nor the Military made any comments outside as to what it contained.

Lieutenant Colonel Samuela Saumatua was revealed as the Chairman of the Board of Inquiry on 3 February. The same day, it was revealed that the inquiry would continue, despite the noncooperation of a number of government officials.

Military lawyer Major Kitione Tuinaosara was quoted by Fiji Live on 4 February as saying that investigations could be concluded within a week. More than 60 witnesses with military connections had been called, Tuinaosara said. He denied that Baledrokadroka himself was the primary focus of the investigation; the object of it was to determine what actually happened on 12 January, he said.

Leweni told Fiji Live on 10–11 February that Korovavala's testimony would no longer been needed, even though he had recently changed his earlier refusal to give evidence. Over 60 witnesses had been called. A source reported to be close to Baledrokadroka quoted him as threatening to open "a can of worms" on the Military if forced to testify. Meanwhile, lawyer Devanesh Sharma questioned the validity of the Board of Inquiry, saying that its being chaired by Lieutenant Colonel Samuela Saumatua, a subordinate of Baledrokadroka's, was out of order. Leweni denied this.

Leweni confirmed to Fiji Village on 14 February that the inquiry had been concluded, and that its findings were to be forwarded to the Legal Section of the Military for a decision on whether to lay any charges against Baledrokadroka or any accomplices he may have had. He did not reveal whether Commodore Bainimarama would take a direct role in the decision.

Leweni announced on 28 February that the inquiry had been concluded, and that a report was being compiled. The report would be forwarded to the Legal Division of the Military, he said.

Fiji Live and Fiji Television reported on 6 March that the Military was considering a court martial against Baledrokadroka. A civil trial was also a possibility, Tuinaosara told Fiji Live. Fiji Television reported that two other officers would be charged with Baledrokadroka. He reiterated this stance on 13 March. Fiji Village reported that charges of insubordination and mutiny would be laid against Baledrokadroka and his alleged accomplices.

==== The civil investigation ====
Radio New Zealand announced on 6 February that Fiji's Public Service Commission (PSC) had appointed an independent team to investigate the allegations that Lesi Korovavala had been involved in the alleged insubordination. Fiji Village quoted PSC Chief Executive Anare Jale on the 8th as disclosing that the team comprised two members. This was later expanded to three members.

On 16 February, the PSC named Vasantika Patel, a Nadi lawyer, to lead the investigation against Korovavala. Businessman Tony Philipps and PSC officer Mereani Vuinakodu were also stated to be members of the team.

On 27 February, Military spokesman Captain Neumi Leweni publicly asked whey Korovavala had not been suspended from his office, in view of the seriousness of the allegations against him. According to the Fiji Sun, he pointed out that a conviction for a similar offence had resulted in a life sentence for the Qaranivalu of Naitasiri, Ratu Inoke Takiveikata, and that an allegation of a much lesser offence had resulted in the forced transferral of Poseci Bune from his secretaryship of the PSC to the Foreign Ministry and subsequently to the diplomatic service. (Bune was later found innocent). PSC Chairman Stuart Huggett responded that no action could be taken against Korovavala while investigations were in progress.
