= Reaction to the 2005–2006 Fijian political crisis =

The crisis that saw a virtual breakdown in relations between Fiji's government and military forces in late 2005 and early 2006, generated fears of civil unrest and even a military coup. The dismissing of Lieutenant Colonel Jone Baledrokadroka, the Acting Land Force Commander, for alleged insubordination on 12 January 2006 was coupled with unusual deployments of troops and naval vessels. Both before and after it was resolved on 16 January with a truce brokered by Acting President Ratu Joni Madraiwiwi, the crisis generated a great deal of comment.

== Official reaction ==
Public Service Commission (PSC) Chief Executive Anare Jale said that the Commander's threatened actions were illegal, but that the PSC, not being the appointing body, was powerless to discipline him. Other non-government commentators accused the government of neglecting its responsibility to deal with a serious challenge.

Minister Vosanibola finally reacted to the Military's demands on 1 January 2006, saying that their stated intention to take over the office of the Home Affairs Chief Executive was unlawful. "The kind of comments he is making is unconstitutional. He should follow the Constitution," he said. He called on the commander to show some "respect," and criticized the media for giving him a platform to air his antigovernment opinions.

In a further statement on 9 January, Vosanibola said that Bainimarama's future as Military Commander would be decided in a meeting later in the week with Vice-President Madraiwiwi. The Prime Minister, for his part, issued a gag order prohibiting Cabinet Ministers except Home Affairs Minister Vosanibola from commenting on the dispute. The order was signed by CEO Jioji Kotobalavu on Prime Minister Qarase's behalf.

Following a truce brokered on 16 January by Madraiwiwi, Vosanibola welcomed the end to the impasse and expressed hopes that it would not resurface.

Police Commissioner Andrew Hughes delivered a strongly worded attack on foreign media, particularly New Zealand television and newspapers, on 18 January, saying that they had orchestrated and exaggerated the crisis. "There was no threat to overthrow the government, which is what a coup is," Hughes told Fiji Live. It was a matter internal to the Military, an attempted mutiny at worst, supported by only one person. He considered it irresponsible of the foreign media to interpret the developments as signs of a coup.

== Politicians' reactions ==
The comments of some politicians, and the silence of others concerning the dispute, was noted by the Fiji Sun early in January 2006.

=== Sitiveni Rabuka ===
Former Prime Minister Sitiveni Rabuka, also a former Military Commander, called on Vosanibola and Prime Minister Laisenia Qarase to face up to their "responsibility" to front up to Bainimarama and discuss the situation with him. The buck stopped with the Prime Minister, he insisted.

On 12 January 2006, the Fiji Village news service cited a New Zealand website as quoting Rabuka as saying that Fiji was on the brink of another coup, and calling on Prime Minister Qarase to get tough with Commodore Bainimarama. The government might fear the power of the army, but the Commander could be replaced, Rabuka said.

Rabuka's comments brought immediate criticism from both sides of the disagreement. Home Affairs Minister Josefa Vosanibola accused Rabuka of inflaming the situation by talking to the international media, while Military spokesman Captain Neumi Leweni said Rabuka's comments were causing unnecessary panic among the population.

=== Mick Beddoes ===
Mick Beddoes, leader of the United Peoples Party, spoke out on 29 December and called on the Prime Minister to call off his holiday on his home island of Vanua Balavu and return to Suva to take charge of the situation. His absence reflected a "could not care less" attitude, Beddoes charged, although the disagreement was a serious one which demanded urgent resolution. Commodore Bainimarama's actions were out of order, he considered, and in a true democracy he would have to be disciplined. In this case, however, the government had brought the situation on itself by its policy of appeasing persons involved or implicated in the 2000 coup. "The Government has never been impartial in its dealings with all matters relating to the events of May 19th and November 2, 2000," the Fiji Sun quoted him as saying.

Among the actions that Beddoes cited as showing the government's support for coup-sympathizers were the secret inquiry which cleared former Police Commissioner Isikia Savua of allegations made against him by former President Ratu Sir Kamisese Mara, the appointment of several coup suspects - including Savua - as ambassadors, the commuting of the death sentence against coup frontman George Speight, and allowing Cabinet Ministers to remain in office while awaiting and standing trial for coup-related offences. The controversial Reconciliation, Tolerance, and Unity Bill, authorizing a Commission to compensate victims and pardon perpetrators of the coup, was another example of the government's bias, which had antagonized the Military, Beddoes said.

Beddoes reiterated these sentiments on 5 January 2006.

On 12 January, Beddoes distanced himself and his party from Fiji Labour Party (FLP) President Jokapeci Koroi's comments the night before that the FLP would support a Military coup. A coup would be detrimental to Fiji, he said, and said he was sure that Koroi's comments did not reflect the position of the Labour Party.

On 13 January, he said that the government had failed by allowing a crisis to develop to the point where it sparked nationwide rumours of an imminent coup. It was irresponsible of the Prime Minister, he said, to "pass the buck" to a subordinate minister who in turn passed it to the Vice-President. The Prime Minister should either take charge in person, or resign.

=== Fiji Labour Party ===
Fiji Labour Party (FLP) spokesman Lekh Ram Vayeshnoi said that Bainimarama's frustration with the government, and with the delay of the court martial, was understandable.

On 11 January 2006, the FLP President, Senator Jokapeci Koroi told Fiji Television's One National News that in the event of the Military staging a coup, the FLP would support it. Home Affairs Minister Vosanibola reported her comments to the police, and called for her to be required to answer to charges of incitement and of threatening public order.

The next day, FLP spokespeople declined to comment on unusual troop deployments at Suva's Queen Elizabeth Barracks, referring all questions to Deputy Leader Poseci Bune, who was away in the northern town of Savusavu. Leader Mahendra Chaudhry was en route home from a visit to India, and could not be reached for comment.

At a press conference on 16 January, FLP leader Mahendra Chaudhry blamed Prime Minister Qarase for the standoff with the Military. As "evidence," he cited an alleged plot to depose Ratu Josefa Iloilo from the presidency in 2000, which Bainimarama, who implicated Qarase, claimed to have foiled. He pointed to the selective releasing of coup-convicts from prison, the controversial Reconciliation, Tolerance, and Unity Bill providing for amnesty to be granted to coup convicts, and the protracted process of commissioning of a Judge Advocate to oversee a court martial retrial.

Chaudhry endorsed claims that the dismissed Land Force Commander, Lieutenant Colonel Jone Baledrokadroka, had attempted to depose the Commander at the behest of the government, and denied claims that the FLP was colluding with the Commander to depose the government. He distanced himself somewhat from Koroi's provocative pronouncements, saying that he had not seen the full tape of the interview and did not know the context of what she had said. "If she was led into saying it, then that's wrong. The party does not support any extra constitutional means to remove a government from office," he clarified on 16 January.

Prime Minister Qarase said in reply that Chaudhry's comments were "full of lies and distortions." In a further comment on 19 January, he announced his intention to sue Chaudhry for defamation.

The truce brokered by Vice-President Madraiwiwi at a crisis meeting between the Prime Minister and the Military Commander that morning would not solve the impasse, he said, because the lines had already been drawn over the Unity Bill.

The Fiji Times quoted police spokeswoman Sylvia Low on 20 January that two complaints had been received concerning Jokapeci Koroi, one concerning her public endorsement of a potential Military coup, and the other concerning allegations she had made about the supposed role of senior civil servant Lesi Korovavala in an alleged army mutiny on 12 January. The former complaint was laid by Home Affairs Minister Josefa Vosanibola, the latter by Korovavala himself.

=== Ratu Epeli Ganilau ===
Former Military Commander Major-General Ratu Epeli Ganilau, who now leads the National Alliance Party, initially reserved comment, saying that with Vice-President Madraiwiwi mediating, it seemed best to leave it to him to come up with a solution. On 6 January, however, he called on both the Military and the government to cooperate and resolve their differences, but added that he shared what he thought was a widespread belief that the government was less concerned about national security than about political advantage. The Military, he considered, was standing firm in its primary purpose of upholding security. The Commander was free to air his views, Ganilau added on 10 January, because there was no regulation to stop him. "What happened in 1987 pales in significance to what is happening now," he said.

On 13 January, following a dramatic escalation in the tension over the previous 48 hours, Ganilau said that the government must act decisively to resolve the impasse. The Military was accountable to the government of the day, he conceded, but the present government bore the responsibility for having allowed the crisis to develop. He warned against any government attempt to divide the loyalty of soldiers, saying that such a move could backfire.

On 18 January, Ganilau said that any dissent within the ranks of the Military constituted a potential threat to national security. Such an institution could not function properly unless orders were followed, and it was for good reason that mutiny was regarded as a capital offence, he said.

=== National Federation Party ===
The National Federation Party, also an opponent of the Qarase government, issued a strongly worded statement quoted by Fiji Village on 3 January 2006 and by the Fiji Times the next day, condemning Commodore Bainimarama's calls for the government's resignation. NFP General Secretary Pramod Rae rebuked Commodore Bainimarama for acting as though he was above the law. The credibility of the government was at stake as the Commander continued with what Rae called "an act of defiance against an elected government, constitutional rule and parliamentary democracy." Rae was joined on 9 January by the party leader, Raman Pratap Singh, who said in response to the latest threat from the Military to remove the government from power that the NFP was totally opposed to the notion of a coup. The government should take heed of the threat, he said.

On 13 January, the NFP's Senior Vice-President Pramod Chand condemned the Fiji Labour Party for offering support to the Military to depose the government. "The FLP is now trying to return to power not through the ballot box but by the barrel of the gun," he said. He called the call "treasonous" and "treachery of the highest order", and called for a police investigation into public statements from the FLP's President, Jokapeci Koroi. (The NFP is the chief rival of the FLP for the Indo-Fijian vote).

=== Fijian Political Party ===
Rae's statement brought an immediate rebuttal from Soqosoqo ni Vakavulewa ni Taukei (SVT) General Secretary Ema Druavesi, who said that the Military would not be acting as it was without proof that "certain ministers" were bending the law for political purposes. It was the Military that had restored order after 2000 she said, and Rae's lack of appreciation was a mark of arrogance. She added on 10 January that the Military was the only organization that remained true to its principles, and that the nation was looking to it for stability.

Commenting on 15 January, following the dismissal on the 13th of Acting Land Force Commander Lieutenant Colonel Jone Baledrokadroka, Druavesi regretted that the decision had been made, and said that the Military needed a man like Baledrokadroka, whom she called a man of high caliber and a good leader.

Following an accord between the government and the Military brokered by Vice-President Ratu Joni Madraiwiwi on 16 January, Druavesi said on the 17th that she was disappointed that the government had agreed to grant the Military and the Police observer status on the National Security Council, saying that mere "observer" status for the two institutions responsible for maintaining security effectively downgraded them.

=== Tupeni Baba ===
Former Cabinet Minister Tupeni Baba, who was held as a hostage in the 2000 coup crisis, said on 13 January that he saw the situation as alarming, and saw the reassurances given by the government and the Military that there was no threat to stability, as not going far enough.

=== United Fiji Party ===
Reacting to the latest Military threat to take control of the country, ruling Soqosoqo Duavata ni Lewenivanua (SDL) General Secretary Jale Baba reiterated an earlier challenge to Commodore Bainimarama, saying that if he thought he could do a better job than the government, he should join a political party and seek power through the ballot box.

=== Fred Caine ===
General Voters Party Vice-President and former Cabinet Minister Fred Caine called on the Qarase government to quit and call an early general election to allow the people to decide who should be trusted with the running of the country.

Caine, who served under the late Ratu Sir Kamisese Mara, said on 18 January that the Prime Minister was responsible 24 hours a day for the country, and should be seen to be in charge in the event of a crisis. Instead, Prime Minister Qarase had continued his vacation while the crisis worsened, and had delegated his responsibility, not to one of the three former Military officers in the Cabinet (Pio Wong, Jonetani Kaukimoce, and Savenaca Draunidalo), but to Home Affairs Minister Josefa Vosanibola, whom Caine scathingly called "an old man who ... knows nothing about the army." He also said the government should not allow irresponsible journalists into Fiji. He cited on report on Australia's ABC News, which had, he said, greatly exaggerated the magnitude of the crisis.

Caine also praised Commodore Bainimarama. It was Bainimarama, Caine said, who restored order in the wake of the 2000 upheaval.

=== Saula Telawa ===
Saula Telawa, President of the New Nationalist Party and self-proclaimed heir to the legacy of the late nationalist leader Sakeasi Butadroka, spoke out on 12 January 2006 and called on the government to resign for the sake of the Fijian race. The reform of the Agriculture, Land, and Tenants Act was "the heart and soul of the Fijian people," he said, and the government's failure to pass it disqualified it from holding office. Speaking to the Fiji Sun, he condemned government moves to arm the police, saying that a confrontation between the police and the Army would result in bloodshed between indigenous Fijians, citing similar occurrences in Papua New Guinea and the Solomon Islands. "It will be a very sad, sad day if it happens in Fiji," he said.

Telawa also called on Police Commissioner Andrew Hughes to stay out of the dispute, saying that as a foreigner, Hughes had no right to interfere in domestic matters and in so doing risk the lives of Fijian police officers.

=== Adi Ema Tagicakibau ===
Adi Ema Tagicakibau, a former politician who was held as a hostage by George Speight's gunmen during the 2000 crisis, said the present dispute was tearing Fijian society apart. In a mature democracy, she said, the Military's actions would be out of order, but in a country like Fiji, it fell to the military to mop up every time politicians did wrong. The crisis was the Qarase government's fault, she said; its open sympathy towards perpetrators of the 2000 coup had antagonized the Military.

=== Joketani Cokanasiga ===
Former Home Affairs Minister Joketani Cokanasiga denied suggestions on 15 January that he had been unable to control Commodore Bainimarama. The Commander had been approachable, straightforward, and easy to work with, Cokanasiga said.

== Other reactions ==
The Fiji Islands Council of Trade Unions (FICTU) issued a statement on 3 January 2006, strongly condemning the feud between the Military and the government, saying that it would cause investors to withdraw from Fiji, causing job losses. The statement called on the disputing sides to resolve the matter urgently.

The Fiji Trade Union Council (a distinct body from the FICTU) condemned the Fiji Labour Party (which is traditionally close to the union movement) for endorsing military threats to depose the government. Speaking on 16 January, the day crucial talks took place between the Prime Minister and the Military Commander under the mediation of Acting President Madraiwiwi, General Secretary Actar Singh called it an "outrage" for the Military to try to control an elected government, made only worse by the public support of a political party.

Tupou Vere, director of the Pacific Concerns Resource Centre, appealed to the Military to resolve its differences with the Home Affairs Minister. The Fiji Sun quoted her on 5 January as saying that failure to resolve the impasse would cause "irreparable damage" to the internal and long-term security of the country. The centre was mindful of this reasons for opposing government policy, she said, but the security of the nation was equally important.

Fiji Visitors Bureau Chief Executive Viliame Gavoka spoke out on 5 January 2006, saying that the dispute would have an adverse effect on the tourism industry. He called for dialogue to overcome the impasse. He reiterated this position on 13 January, after a sudden deepening of the crisis, saying that it was imperative to resolve the standoff quickly.

Rev. Akuila Yabaki, Executive Director of the Citizen's Constitutional Forum, spoke out on 9 January 2006. While blaming what he called the government's broken promises for the crisis, Yabaki also condemned Bainimarama's latest threat to overthrow the government as a threat to democracy. The forum found it hard to support a government which, he said, had continually disregarded the rule of law, but would not condone any attempts to remove an elected government from power except through the ballot box.

On 13 January, following a dramatic escalation in the tension over the preceding 48 hours, Yabaki said that the fate of the Military Commander should be up to the Acting President, Ratu Joni Madraiwiwi. Any move within the Army to remove him would be wrong, and would play into the hands of supporters of the 2000 coup, he said. Bainimarama's attempts to prosecute perpetrators of the coup enjoyed wide public support, he considered.

Fiji Women's Rights Movement Programme Manager Naeemah Khan also called on Bainimarama to refrain from taking matters into his own hands. She appreciated Bainimarama's good intentions, she said, but insisted that he should leave the enforcement of the law to the courts, the Director of Public Prosecutions, and the police. "We cannot enforce the rule of law by breaking the law," she told Fiji Live.

Josaia Waqabaca and Maciu Navakasuasua, who both spent time in prison on charges related to the 2000 coup, spoke out on 11 January 2006 in support of Commodore Bainimarama's stand against the main perpetrators of the coup. The leadership of Prime Minister Qarase could mean the "demise" of the Fijian race, Waqabaca told the Fiji Sun. He accused networks within the present government of protecting those who planned and financed the coup. Navakasuasua, for his part, said that if the key people who planned and executed the coup were free, anything could happen. Both men saw Bainimarama as a saviour who could return Fiji to what Navakasuasua called its "rightful path." "These people are the root of the coup culture and once they are put away this country can move forward," he said.

Taito Waradi, President of the Fiji Chamber of Commerce, said on 13 January that any failure on the part of the government to create a stable environment would undermine the confidence of investors. The government must find a quick solution to the impasse and focus on building the nation, he told the Fiji Live news service. He reiterated this position on the 15th, saying that the coups of 1987 and 2000 had seen a shrinkage in private sector investment, from 10.8% in 1987 to 7.5% in 1988; following the 2000 coup, it had dropped to 3.1%, he said.

The Sugar Cane Growers Council Chief Executive Officer Jagannath Sami declared on 15 January that democracy and the rule of law needed to be respected, even if the government was not to everybody's liking. "You can't run a country if you allow the civil service, the military, the police to start dictating to a democratically elected government. Whichever the government may be whether we like the government or we don't," Fiji Television quoted him as saying.

Ratu Ovini Bokini, Chairman of the powerful Great Council of Chiefs, said that the Great Council would not intervene in the impasse between the government and the Military. He expressed support for the ongoing negotiations between the feuding parties, and was confident that "good sense" would prevail.

Australian National University academic Brij Lal, who was one of the authors of the Fijian Constitution, said on 12 January that the Military needed to resolve its concerns without creating security fears. The verdict of the ballot box should be respected, he said, and the Military had to work through the proper channels.

Muslim Jammaat Fiji Vice-President Tahir Munshi said on 18 January that both parties to the dispute needed to set out their differences, and make the effort to resolve them. He commended Commodore Bainimarama for standing by his words to bring justice and freedom to Fiji, but now was the time to come together and "create a good atmosphere of love," he said.

Kadavu Provincial Council Chairman Ratu Josateki Nawalowalo accused Commodore Bainimarama of "living in the past." It was important to move on, he said, and leave the events of 2000 behind, he said on 15 January, adding that the Qarase government was supported not only by the Fijian people, but more importantly, but the Great Council of Chiefs. The government had attracted overseas investment and generated wealth, he said, and the fourteen Provincial Councils should support with without reservation.

Commenting after the crisis had been defused, former Methodist Church President, Reverend Josateki Koroi attacked Commodore Bainimarama on 22 January, calling him an unstable and insecure person resorting to "bullying" tactics, which had not stopped even after the agreement brokered by the Acting President. The bodyguards accompanying the Commander gave the impression that he was defending himself rather than the nation, Koroi told the Fiji Sun, declaring that Lieutenant Colonel Jone Baledrokadroka had been right to confront him. "He (Bainimarama) has no integrity at all," Koroi said. Military spokesman Captain Neumi Leweni rebuffed Koroi's attack, saying that Koroi himself had been forcibly removed from the Presidency of the Methodist Church for poor performance, and should learn from his past.

Raymond Croxon, Chairman of the Movement for Democracy in Fiji, said on 24 January that the government and the Military were both wrong, the former for its "arrogance" and "overconfidence," and its inclusion of "racists", and the latter for ignoring the government's electoral mandate. Both parties needed to be more careful in their dealings with each other, Croxon said.

Jeremaia Waqanisau, Fiji's Ambassador to China, told PACNEWS on 1 February that the uncertainty caused by the friction between the government and the Military was an obstacle to Chinese investment in Fiji. The Fijian embassy in Beijing was continually having to engage in damage control, he said.

== Foreign reaction ==
Relatively few foreign governments commented on the dispute. Only fellow-Commonwealth members New Zealand and Australia, together with the United States, made any public pronouncements.

=== New Zealand ===
Michael Green, New Zealand's High Commissioner to Fiji, downplayed the significance of the dispute. Speaking to the New Zealand Herald, Green considered the threats from the Military to be no more than rhetoric. Cabinet Minister Chris Carter, however, appeared to take a more serious view. "New Zealand's view is that the military has no direct role to play in the political life of any democratic country."

Reacting to the dispute which led to the dismissal of Land Force Commander Baleidrokadroka on 13 January, Acting High Commissioner Joanna Kempkers told New Zealand's Dominion Post newspaper on the 18th that Lieutenant Colonel Jeremy Ramsden been briefed by Commodore Bainimarama about what had happened, and that New Zealand was pleased with the way the situation had been resolved.

Green was quoted in the New Zealand Herald on 21 January that he considered another Military coup unlikely.

=== Australia ===
In the wake of the sudden worsening of the crisis on 11–12 January, the Australian High Commission advised its nationals in Fiji to monitor the situation carefully and take precautions. In a statement on 14 January, Australia's Deputy Prime Minister Mark Vaile warned the Fiji Military not to stage a coup, saying that it was important for the Military to stay out of politics. "There is a democratically elected government in position, in operation, governing Fiji that should be left to do its job," Vaile was quoted by Fiji Live as saying.

=== United States ===
On 13 January, The United States embassy in Suva issued a warning to its citizens in Fiji to take greater precautions. Following the truce brokered on the 16th by Vice-President Madraiwiwi, United States Ambassador Larry Dinger said he was pleased with the way the crisis had been defused peacefully.
