= Naitasiri (Fijian Communal Constituency, Fiji) =

Former electoral constituency in Fiji

Naitasiri Fijian Provincial Communal is a former electoral division of Fiji, one of 23 communal constituencies reserved for indigenous Fijians. Established by the 1997 Constitution, it came into being in 1999 and was used for the parliamentary elections of 1999, 2001, and 2006. (Of the remaining 48 seats, 23 were reserved for other ethnic communities and 25, called Open Constituencies, were elected by universal suffrage). The electorate was coextensive with Naitasiri Province.

The 2013 Constitution promulgated by the Military-backed interim government abolished all constituencies and established a form of proportional representation, with the entire country voting as a single electorate.

== Election results ==
In the following tables, the primary vote refers to first-preference votes cast. The final vote refers to the final tally after votes for low-polling candidates have been progressively redistributed to other candidates according to pre-arranged electoral agreements (see electoral fusion), which may be customized by the voters (see instant run-off voting).

In the 2001 election, Ilaitia Tuisese won with more than 50 percent of the primary vote; therefore, there was no redistribution of preferences.

=== 1999 ===
Candidate	Political party	Votes (primary)	%	Votes (final)	%
Peceli Rinakama	Fijian Association Party (FAP)	2,648	29.45	6,403	71.21
Kavekini Navuso	Nationalist Vanua Tako Lavo Party (NVTLP)	2,483	27.61	2,589	28.80
Solomoni Naivalu	Soqosoqo ni Vakavulewa ni Taukei (SVT)	1,965	21.85	...	...
Asesela Ravuvu	Christian Democratic Alliance	1,896	21.09	...	...
Total		8,992	100.00	8,992	100.00

=== 2001 ===
Candidate	Political party	Votes	%
Ilaitia Tuisese	Soqosoqo Duavata ni Lewenivanua (SDL)	6,505	75.61
Peceli Rinakama	Conservative Alliance (CAMV)	2,098	24.39
Total		8,603	100.00

=== 2006 ===
Candidate	Political party	Votes	%
Ilaitia Bulidiri Tuisese	Soqosoqo Duavata ni Lewenivanua (SDL)	8,455	84.14
Maika Moroca	Fiji Labour Party (FLP)	424	4.22
Manoa Laqere Naitala	Independent	413	4.11
Kavekini Navuso	National Alliance Party (NAPF)	404	4.02
Jope Gonevulavula	Nationalist Vanua Tako Lavo Party	353	3.51
Total		10,049	100.00

== Sources ==
- Psephos - Adam Carr's electoral archive
- Fiji Facts
