= Lagamu Vuiyasawa =

Fijian politician

Adi Lagamu Lewaturaga Vuiyasawa is a Fijian businesswoman and former politician who served in the Senate of Fiji from November 2005 to December 2006. She was the partner and later wife of Senator Ratu Inoke Takiveikata, and the sister of Jone Baledrokadroka.

Vuiyasawa hails from Nairukuruku Village in Naitasiri Province. She is the daughter of former Senator Ratu Alipate Baledrokadroka. She was educated at Saint Anne's Primary School and St Joseph's Secondary School, Fiji, and Kay International College of Hairdressing in Auckland, New Zealand. She subsequently served as president of the Naitasiri Provincial Council.

On 4 November 2005, she was appointed to the Senate to complete the unexpired term of her then-de facto partner, Ratu Inoke Takiveikata, who forfeited his seat owing to his imprisonment on charges related to his role in an army mutiny that followed the 2000 Fijian coup d'état. In her first speech in the Senate, she denounced domestic violence. Her career in the Senate came to an end with the 2006 Fijian coup d'état.

Vuiyasawa's relationship to Takiveikata became known to the public only after her appointment to the Senate, and Opposition MP Poseci Bune declared her appointment in such circumstances to be unethical. Vuiyasawa herself defended her appointment on 5 December, saying that it was based not on her relationship to Takiveikata, but on her own ties with Naitasiri Province as the President of the Naitasiri Soqosoqo Vaka Marama. Adi Lagamu and Ratu Inoke were legally married after Ratu Inoke was released from Prison in 2007.
