= Timeline of the 2005–2006 Fijian political crisis =

The following timeline chronicles the crisis that saw a virtual breakdown in relations between Fiji's government and military fores in late 2005 and early 2006, until it was resolved on 16 January with a truce brokered by Acting President Ratu Joni Madraiwiwi.

Source: Fiji Times, 15 January 2006; some details from other sources.

9 January 2006 (Monday), 8.00 a.m.: Commodore Josaia Vorege (Frank) Bainimarama, the Commander of the Republic of Fiji Military Forces, meets senior officers and allegedly orders them to free him by force in the event of his arrest.

Despite his role in the appointment of an interim government in 2000, many of whose members form the nucleus of the present government, Bainimarama has since grown disenchanted with it, accusing it of dealing too leniently with convicted perpetrators of a civilian coup and two army mutinies that rocked Fiji in 2000.

10 January 2006 (Tuesday), 8.30 a.m.: Acting Land Force Commander Lieutenant Colonel Jone Baledrokadroka meets with Senior Military Officers to solicit their endorsement.

11 January 2006 (Wednesday), 10.30 a.m.: Baledrokadroka explains to Bainimarama that the purpose of the previous day's meeting had been Reverse psychology, a military tactic to expose traitors. Bainimarama claims to have believed him.

12 January 2006 (Thursday):

- Bainimarama calls Baledrokadroka to cancel a scheduled meeting.
- 8.30 a.m.: Baledrokadroka meets with all senior officers to outline plans as new Acting Land Force Commander, and orders closure of gates, which reopen at 2 p.m..

13 January 2006 (Friday):

- 9.30 a.m.: Baledrokadroka confronts Bainimarama, asking for his resignation.
- 10.00 a.m.: Bainimarama dismisses Baledrokadroka, claiming to have established that the true purpose of meetings held on the 10th was to plot against him as Commander.

14 January 2006 (Saturday): Bainimarama accuses Baledrokadroka of having threatened to shoot him. Baledrokadroka angrily denies this.

16 January 2006 (Monday): Acting President Ratu Joni Madraiwiwi brokers a truce between the Military Commander and the government.
