= Taukei ni Waluvu =

Fijian chiefly title

Taukei ni Waluvu is a Fijian phrase for "Owner of the Flood." It is the traditional chiefly title of the warrior hill clan Siko-Natabutale of Nairukuruku village. The history of the clan from the mid- nineteenth century, represent the social structures of the chiefly system, religion and western culture that supported colonialism in Fiji. Tradition, Christianity and British indirect rule were combined to legitimize what was accepted as the right way to govern. Condemned by some modern day critics as exploitative, the Fijian chiefly system was the medium of native social interdependence and a traditional contract shared by the indigenous clans of pre-colonial Fiji, that was utilized for colonial rule. Since Independence the chiefly system has had to adapt to the demands of modernity. Anthropologist Arthur Capell in his study of early tribal migration within Fiji made the point that, "the history of Fiji is the history of chiefly families." The phrase in fact emphasized the hierarchical nature of Fijian traditional society where chiefly power was held sacred. The relationship between Chiefs and Westerners in especially Missionaries thus became a focal point for gathering insight into Fijian culture and tradition in the nineteenth century. James Turner a latter anthropologist found, "The chiefly families of Nairukuruku were the first in the eastern highlands of Viti Levu to declare their allegiance to the central government and as a result of this support their influence expanded throughout the area".

== The legend ==
While I was in Vunidawa, news came through, first communicated by messages on lalis (hollowed- out wooden drums) beaten from village to village that Ratu Manasa the Taukei ni Waluvu (Native or Owner of the Floods), highest chief of Waima, Matailobau and Nagonenicolo districts had died in Nairukuruku... It was standard belief that with the death of the holder of the hereditary title floods would follow for a fortnight. I had to go to the ceremony of reguregu and have presented on my behalf by my matanivanua a whale's tooth for mourning. It had been fine up till now but on the day after the news the heavens opened with torrents. The river swept up at a forbidding level and with menacing currents. – British Colonial administrator Philip Snow, 1944.

The Taukei ni Waluvu traditionally is the leading chief of the chiefdom of Matailobau, Matailobau District that originally consisted of twelve tribes, in Naitasiri Province. Turner, observed the cultural transformation, where, the high chief of Nairukuruku Matailobau is not removed from his subjects, but sits in a more egalitarian rather than a hierarchical village structure. An outsider's initial impression is that he is primus inter pares in his district. Matailobau District being one of the Pre-Colonial States of Eastern Viti Levu Island and formerly of Colo East hill province. In 1945 Colo East merged with Naitasiri Province. The other Eastern Viti Levu Pre-Colonial States being Verata, Waimaro, Bau, Rewa, Naitasiri and Namosi.

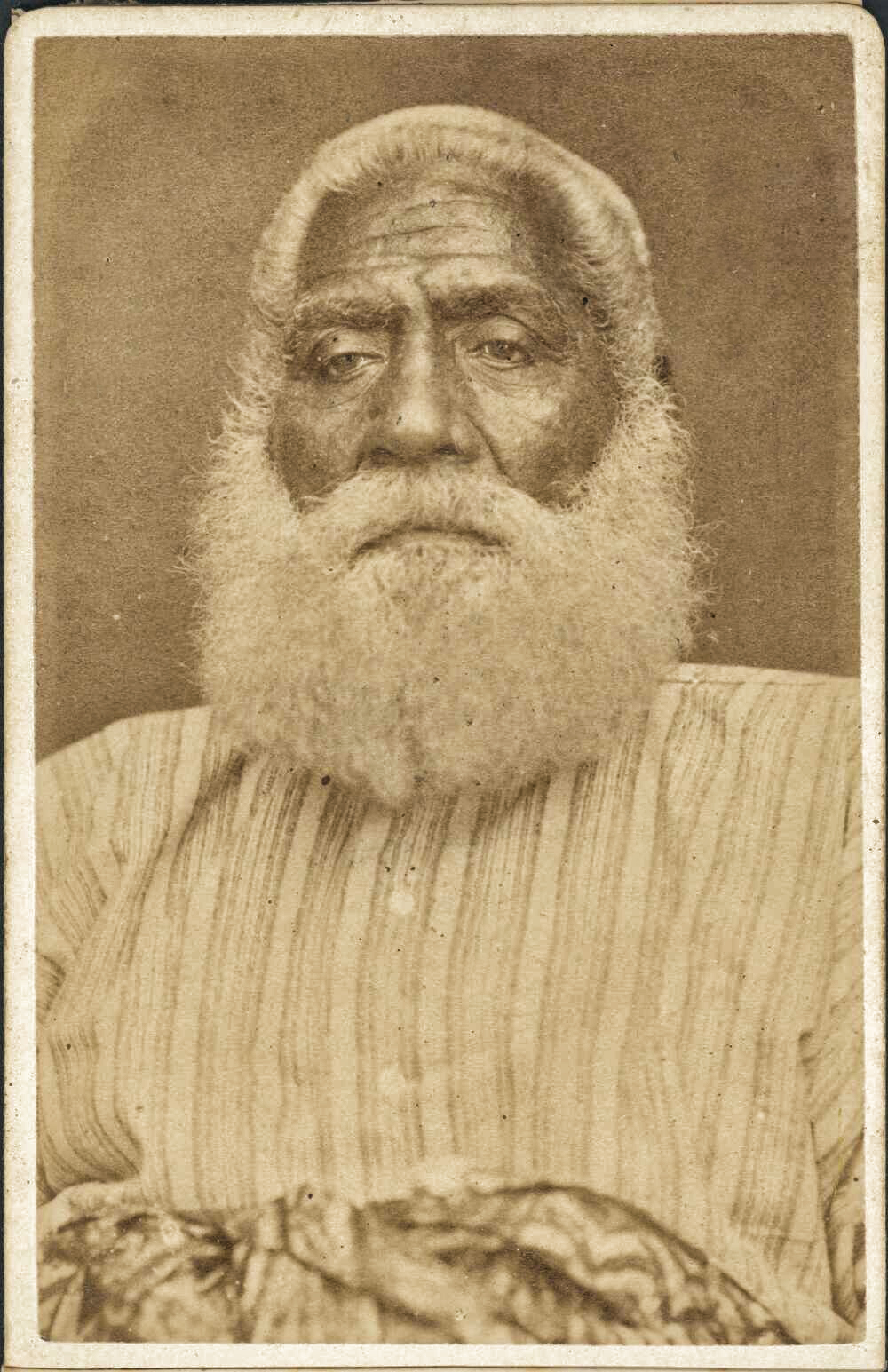
Ratu Seru Apenisa Cakobau Vunivalu of Bau 1852–1883

In September 1862, zealous Methodist missionary Reverend Frederick Langham, had journeyed via Nalawa District Ra, up the Wainimala river headwaters of Viti Levu to Nakorosule-Waimaro. He was advised by the Nakorosule chief, Rotavisoro who was also the nephew of the Taukei ni Waluvu, that traditional protocol necessitated his uncle Rodavetanivalu, known then as the Taukei Waiburebure of Navaulele be first converted.

Reverend Wallace Deane recounted the Nakorosule chief saying, "If I embrace the religion which you bring, my relatives will be angry with me. My advice is: go to the Taukei Waiburebure at Navaulele. He is my chiefly uncle. If he desires the Lotu (religion), I will accept it also." Perhaps Henderson's observation is appropriate, to understanding Rotavisoro's dilemma, "any leading chief who embraced Christianity in Fiji at this time took upon himself great risks. His authority was based to some extent on his efficiency, especially in war; but more on his supposed descent from the gods whom the people propitiated and feared. By severing his connexion with the old gods he cut the ground from under his feet, and struck a blow at the authority of every other chief in Fiji which they would not be slow to resent." As documented in Fiji Methodist history, Ratu Meli Rodavetanivalu II accepted the Lotu and became a nominal Christian through Langham on 14 September 1862 and was later baptized in 1867 by Reverend Thomas Baker on his fateful journey to Navosa. Bauan kinship politics through the Tui Nalawa was instrumental in the Taukei ni Waluvu's conversion. Reverend Deane in recounting this episode stated "The 'Native of the Flood' was not proof against the high honours placed upon him by Cakobau, and after a long talk with his councillors, agreed to receive the Gospel in a nominal way an act that was fraught with gravest calamity and greatest blessing for his people." Deane then continued in some detail 'The Native of the Flood,' acting at once, gathered the people of his own together, and told them of his decision. His word was, of course, practically supreme, and after hearing what he had to say, they shouted their approval with loud voices and allowed the Gospel into their midst."

Tradition records that Ratu Seru Cakobau, the Vunivalu of Bau and Tui Viti, honoured Rodavetanivalu II, Vunivalu of Navaulele for being a staunch ally of his Christianization and pacification campaigns of the hill tribes by conferring on him the title 'Native of the Floods' or Taukei-ni-Uwaluvu from his earlier title Taukei Waiburebure. In any case the title meaning remained the same. In the Bauan dialect the word for flood is 'uwaluvu' whilst in the Matailobau dialect it is 'waiburebure'. In April 1868, as recorded by Sir John Thurston, Ratu Cakobau in retaliation of the Reverend Thomas Baker massacre at Navatusila, launched a two pronged campaign via the Rewa River and the Ra coast with the Matailobau and Waimaro-Soloira tribes as allies.

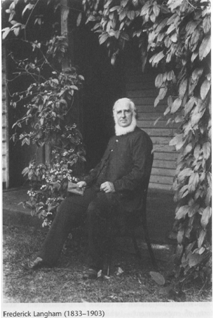
Reverend Frederick Langham c. 1890s. Physically impressive with leonine hair and beard, Langham believed himself the champion of the Fijians and encouraged annexation by Britain. Nicknamed the "Cardinal", he lived on Bau Island from 1861 where he won repute among colonists as Cakobau's adviser.

In a cabinet memorandum from King Cakobau's private secretary Henry Milne to his Minister of Native Affairs, Robert Swanston, lies further evidence of Cakobau's close relations with the Taukei ni Waluvu during the campaign. The memorandum dated 19 May 1873, announced, "The king is now at Matailobau, and has in conjunction with the chiefs assembled there, determined to go through Viti Levu. The Matailobau as you are aware are very old allies of the king." Apparently Cakobau's traditional links to the Taukei ni Waluvu can be traced to the Vunivalu's ancestors, the Nadurucoko in Wainibuka and the Dewala in Ra. Milne's memorandum makes it quite explicit what Cakobau and the Taukei ni Waluvu's intentions were as was spelled out, "By the King's last letter(13 May 1873) the Honourable the Minister for Naive Affairs will see that it is intended to push through the hills and if necessary force all 'Colo' to submit to the general Government."

Cakobau's Christianization campaign or Valu ni Lotu was then mounted as recounted by Robert Nicole, "In 1873 the fledgling Cakobau government embarked on a campaign of subjugation in the north and west (especially Qaliyalatini, Naloto, Magodro, Yakete, Vaturu, Sabeto and Navatusila) and in the central and eastern parts of the interior( especially Nadawarau, Muaira, Waikalou, Soloira, Nalawa, and Nasau)." Nicole continued, "With the capture and execution of numerous Colo chiefs during this campaign, interior districts to the East and North were severely weakened."

The campaign was effectively over when Nubutautau, stronghold of the Magodro fell on 11 September 1873 to Cakobau's forces.

In 1998, a meke -i- wau (traditional club dance) of Bukuya village in Magodro district in the Province of Ba performed for the Prime Minister Sitiveni Rabuka, recounted the Taukei ni Waluvu's tribal skirmishes in that part of Viti Levu's western highlands.

According to Fiji Wesleyan church authority, the more exalted Taukei-ni-Waluvu title, now bestowed upon the chiefly patron of Wesleyan Christianity in the interior of Viti Levu, was metaphorical to the biblical account of Noah's divine commission prior to the great floods.

Most probably, the title change by Ratu Seru Cakobau was consistent with Bauan tradition where honorific titles were proclaimed on warriors to signify chivalrous deeds. The Vunivalu of Bau is said to have embellished his ally's renown as the traditional rainmaker in preferring the title. In pre-Christian times such a power was credited to the Taukei Waiburebure. This mystical power is thought to still remain with the Taukei ni Waluvu today through the chiefly clan's bete (priests) of Nabena village.

Commodore Goodenough in his journey up the Wainimala river to Nairukuruku on 21 January 1874, with Reverend Langham and Ratu Timoci Tavanavanua, son of Ratu Cakobau, met with [Ratu Meli], "the Governor of the twelve tribes of Matailobau, who was the first to Lotu in these parts." The twelve tribes were made up of the old tikinas of Lutu, Waima, Matalobau and Nagonenicolo. Furthermore recording that the former heathen chief's, " left ear lobe is distended enough to carry a stick from one and a half to two inches in diameter". According to Brewster this disfiguring was the fashion of the highlanders where small prized articles were secured in the distended ear lobes.

Ratu Meli Rodavetanivalu II had two sons Ratu Drekenavere and Ratu Isikeli. Ratu Drekenavere had a daughter Adi Vaciseva who was given firstly to the Tui Namosi, Romatanitobua as a bride though later married the Vunivalu Rara. Their issue, a son Ratu Ilaitia Baleinaivalu, was later Buli Lomaivuna. Ratu Isikeli was once Buli Nalawa in Ra Province. He had a son, Ratu Sailosi (1898–1932), raised on Bau Island as a youth, he died heirless. Ratu Meli hence did not have any surviving male issue. Legend has it, that, Ratu Meli had a canine pet named Tui Colo, which probably was a gift from Reverend Langham. The black dog, possibly the first canine recorded in the hills, was a status symbol for the chief. Ratu Meli died during the measles epidemic that ravished Fiji and indeed the hill tribes from January to June 1875. Tui Colo was buried alive with his fallen master in his grave mound at Navunitavola-Navaulele. A probable Christian compromise to heathen burial rites where in former times, the high chief's wives would have been strangled to accompany him to the underworld. On Ratu Meli Davetanivalu II's demise, his elder brother Ratu Manasa Davetanivalu and younger brother Ratu Viliame Batiratu and uncle Rovucago's descendants, according to chiefly succession tradition have held the title Taukei ni Waluvu.

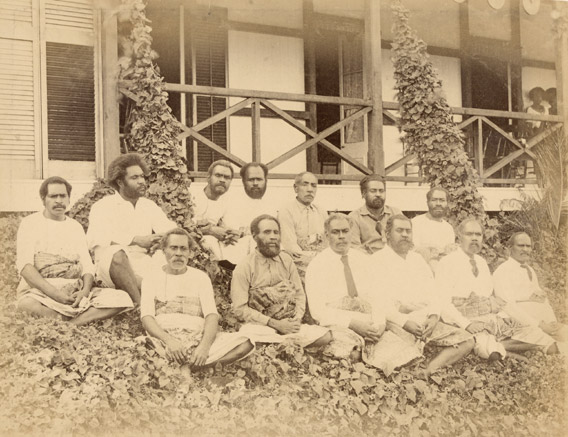
High Chiefs of Fiji 1880s. Turaga Buli and son of Taukei ni Waluvu Ratu Meli Davetanivalu II seated first left in second row. A photograph showing a group of Fijian chiefs, sitting in two rows in front of the verandah of Government House at Suva. The occasion is not certain. It is most probable the chiefs as Roko Tui's -head provincial administrators were invited by the Governor to celebrate either the Golden Jubilee of the Methodist Church in Fiji in 1885 or Queen Victoria's Golden Jubilee on 20 June 1887. All were high chiefs in their own right. 1–6 left to right, front row: 1. Ratu Luke Tabualovoni, Buli Wainunu, Bua; 2. Ratu Kinijoji Katonivere, Rokotui Macuata; 3. Ratu Tevita Suraki, Rokotui Ra; 4. Ratu Epeli Nailatikau, Rokotui Tailevu; 5. Ratu Marika Toroca, Rokotui Lomaiviti; 6. Ratu Nemani Driu, Rokotui Ba kei Yasawa. 7–13 left to right, back row: 7. Buli from Colo East Ratu Isikeli Davetanivalu; 8. Ratu Peni Tanoa, Rokotui Naitasiri; 9. Buli from Colo West, Tui Noikoro Ratu Katonisau; 10. Ratu Luke Nakulanikoro, Rokotui Nadroga; 11. Ratu Sairusi Dula Rokotui Kadavu; 12. Ratu Timoci Tavanavanua, Rokotui Rewa; 13. Ro Matanitobua, Rokotui Namosi. Missing are Rokotui Cakaudrove Province, Ratu Josefa Lalabalavu and Rokotui Lau Province, Roko Eroni Loganimoce. Originally Tailevu and Naitasiri counted for one Province with Ratu Epeli Nailatikau as Roko Tui. In 1882 the Province was split in two with Ratu Peni Tanoa as Rokotui Naitasiri. In 1877 Serua Province was carved from Rewa Province under a "Buli- Roko" Ratu Kinijoji Gagabokola.

Sir Arthur Gordon Fiji's first substantive Governor in establishing colonial rule from 1875 to 1878, had originally created 12 Provinces headed by Roko Tui's and two hill Provinces on Viti Levu- Colo East and Colo West headed by respective Governor's Commissioners. In 1893 another Commissionership, Colo North was created from these two Colo Provinces and from areas of Ra, Ba and the Yasawa group.

== History and ethnology ==
According to Adolf Brewster,(see Joske's Thumb), Commissioner Colo East 1884–90, and elaborated by Arthur Capell, the genealogies of the hill tribes tend to go back some eleven or twelve generations from the time of his research. Basil Thomson and Brewster had worked on a basis of thirty years to a generation. So granting it, the founder seems to in each case to have lived about AD 1600.

The Taukei ni Waluvu clan trace their ancestry to Rokowai who founded their tokatoka Natabutale lineage at Nakamarusi around 1600 AD. Rokowai's ancestry through his father, the high chief of Navunidakua is traced back to Robonowai, the son with mystical powers of Ranadi ni Namasia the daughter of the Tui Nalawa in Ra. Clan folklore tells that Rokowai, who was the insolent and audacious youngest son in the chiefly household, had to flee the village as his brothers led by Nayacakuru had hatched a plot to harm him. The young chief fled with members of the chiefly clan's bati, sauturaga, matanivanua and bete who were loyal to him. Their descendants still reside with the Taukei ni Waluvu in Nairukuruku and its older stronghold sister village Taulevu. The Taukei ni Waluvu as head of Yavusa Siko includes the mataqalis: Siko Natabutale (Nairukuruku), Siko Navunisalusalu of Taulevu village (Matailobau District), Siko Navunidakua of Naqara village (Waima District) and Siko Koroqele of Nakorovatu village (Waima District).

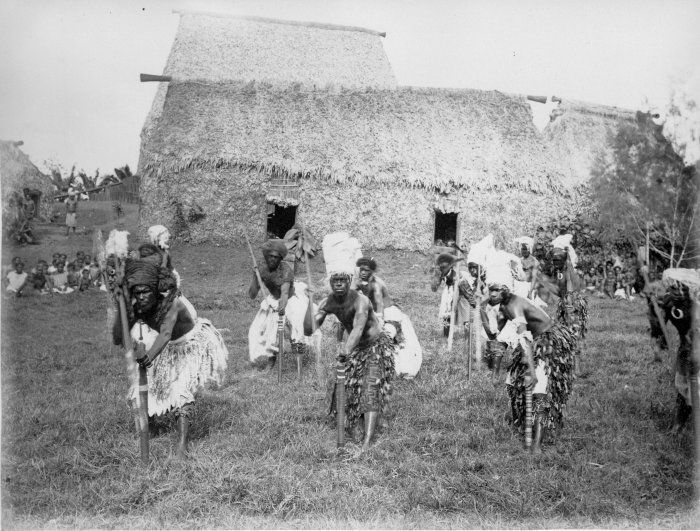
Meke Wesi- Spear Dance, Nakorovatu, Matailobau 1881. A group of traditionally dressed Matailobau warriors with charcoal blackened faces in three lines grasping their spears and leaning forward on their war clubs. Most are wearing turban like headgear. Behind them are densely thatched village buildings, and two groups of people sitting watching from a distance at Nakorovatu, Matailobau, 1881.

Rokowai's older brothers were Nayacakuru, Rosauturaga and Rovakacodrowai. Rokowai's wife Kororava was from the Vunimoli clan of Waidracia village. Rokowai had five sons: Rokotokalau, Rorairuku, Rotabuwaiwai, Rocaginidaveta( no issue) and Iranaqarikau. Clan legend also narrates, that Rokowai's manna was manifested when a fire burnt only the thatching of his great bure without destroying its wooden framed structure. The Clans founding ancestor's yavu was thus bestowed the name Nakamarusi or "burnt thatching". Celebrated female author Constance Gordon-Cumming describes Nakamarusi on her visit to the village stronghold on 27 December 1875, "the village of Nakamerousi [sic] had attracted my especial admiration. It is perched on a steep bank, and looks right along a broad reach of the river to a beautiful mountain range."

The clan's movements is traced from Navunidakua (district of Waima) to Nakamarusi, then onto the hill features: Taulevu, Ulira and Navaulele respectively, and finally to present Nairukuruku. Rokowai's eldest son Iranaqarikau, had three sons: Iranabobo I, Naitege and Tabuadunaki. Iranaqarikau's wife was Ro Ligatabua from Nasautoka. Iranabobo I had four sons: Roraiova, Rovucago Naitege and Rokorainima. After Iranabobo his brother Davetanivalu led the clan from Taulevu. On contacting leprosy Davetanivalu handed over to his eldest nephew the son of Iranabobo, Roraiova the authority as head of the clan in early 1859. After Raiova's death during his Valu ni lulu campaign, his fourth son Ratu Meli Davetanivalu acceded to the title on the deaths of his uncle (tamana lada) Rovucago and his elder brothers, Ratu Manasa, Radibi and Robale in 1862.

Navaulele and Ulira were the hill fortifications and pre-Christian villages of the Taukei ni Waluvu, situated just a kilometer due west from present Nairukuruku across the Wainimala river. From these two strategic locations, the clan's influence and power were projected into the Waimaro and Navitilevu tribal heartlands of eastern Viti Levu. Both these koro ni valu (war villages) were heavily fortified and sat surrounded by ringed dry moats to protect from other marauding and warring hill tribes. The other Siko clan's fortified village close to Nairukuruku of Taulevu where the yavu (bure foundation) of Natabutale is built, looks east into the Wainibuka and Verata heartlands.

The chiefly clan had moved out of its hill fortification onto the Nairukuruku river plain after the conversion to Christianity by Reverend Frederick Langham of chief Ratu Meli Davetanivalu at Navaulele on 14 September 1862. As recountered by Reverend Deane, two Nalawa chiefs, Sogonaivi and Naqari who accompanied Rev. Langham played a part in Ratu Meli, the Taukei ni Waluvu's, conversion to Christianity. The relocation from Navaulele to the present spectacular Nairukuruku river valley was only possible in post Christian times after belligerent surrounding tribes shunning Christianity and colonial encroachment were subdued and converted.

Taukei ni Waluvu, Roraiova, son of Iranabobo I, in his tribal wars known as the 'Valu ni Lulu', is credited for spreading the clan's power and influence throughout Tholo East, up to Vatusekiyasawa village on the northern coast of Viti Levu to include an alliance with the Tui Bua on Vanua Levu. The origins of this traditional alliance with the Tui Bua can be traced to the mythological tale of the Tui Uluibua and Ro Namasia na marama Tabusiga daughter of the Tui Nalawa in Ra. She apparently after drinking the mysterious waters from a waterfall gave birth to Robonowai –the great ancestor of the Taukei Ni Waluvu. Roraiova's son Roradibi was skilled in the use of musketry firearms that was a marked advantage over traditional hand weapons in these inter tribal skirmishes.

By tribal migration movements and marital linkages the more prominent ancient hill tribes such as the Yavusa: Nasautoka, Navitilevu, Burenitu, Noemalu, Navatusila, Taladrau, Waimaro, Nabubuco, Nabukebuke, Nacobicibici, Dreketi, Rara, Viria and Vuna are traditionally blood linked to the Yavusa Siko of the Taukei ni Waluvu. Hence pre-christian names of renowned Vunivalu's such as Rovucago of the Noemalu tribe, Robatiratu of the Nabukebuke tribe and Roragoca of the Soloira tribe were all bestowed on generations of Taukei ni Waluvu chiefs known as vaka toka yaca. In pre-Christian days, the name of a chief was sacred and in later generations his name was only bestowed on a close blood relative.

== Nairukuruku – totemism, Christianity and political ascendancy ==
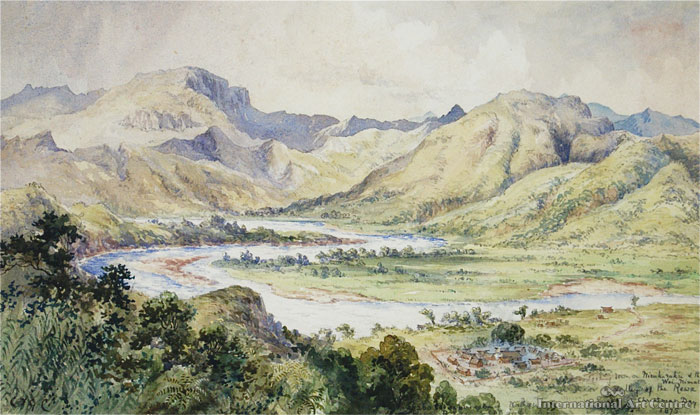
Nairukuruku Village in foreground, on Christmas Day 1875. Artist: Constance Gordon-Cumming (1837–1924). Looking south-west from Taulevu ridge with Wainimala river flowing from right to left. Highest feature is Nariko peak in left farground. Other features shown are Nacau and Ulira peaks in right mid-ground. Established a few years earlier after re-locating from Navaulele, the village is surrounded by a dry moat. The large bure within the village is the church. Notably two homesteads outside the village to the west are that of the native minister and Ratu Viliame Batiratu's residence by the river named yavu- ni-turaga levu.Today, with a population of 300, five mataqalis or clans reside together in Nairukuruku village. They are namely: Siko Natabutale (chiefly clan), Nawaita (warriors), Nabubuco (chief's elders), Nakorowaqa (heralds), and Navitilevu (warriors).

The village of Nairukuruku, home of the Taukei ni Waluvu in the district of Matailobau, was inhabited around 1872. That year fighting had broken out between the converted Matailobau tribes and the tevoro Lomai Colo tribes causing this re-location from Navaulele.

"Nairukuruku" – translated means – "an entrance", probably due to its strategic location into the highlands by river and by land. Moreover, the entry and spread of Christianity into the eastern highlands of Viti Levu from this village is well documented. After the conversion of Cakobau to Christianity in April 1854 an approach was later made that year to the Taukei Waiburebure, Iranabobo, by way of traditional ties with the Tui Nalawa on behalf of Cakobau for the Colo chief to accept Christianity. This approach or carasala is recorded in Matailobau history. A second approach to Lotu was made in December 1859 by Rev Langham through The Taukei Waiburebure's traditional links to Viria, Lomaivuna to Roraiova, Iranabobo's son. In September 1860, Roraiova launched his 'Valu ni Lulu' or Christian conversion campaign of the hill tribes with envoys being sent to Noemalu, Soloira, Nadrau and Nagonenicolo districts. Roraiova and his three sons, (Ratu Manasa Davetanivalu- his eldest son, Ratu Waisea Radibi and Ratu Alipate Baledrokadroka) lost their lives in these Christian conversion skirmishes from 1862-1874. Roraiova's brother Rovucago then replaced him as head of the Siko clan but was also killed in these Christian skirmishes in early 1862. Rovucago was replaced by Roraiova's fourth son Ratu Meli Davetanivalu who on 14 September 1862 officially accepted the cloth to lotu on Rev Langham's third approach to the Siko Natabutale tribe.

A contending interpretation of the word "rukuruku" is taken from the native indigenous Naga religious cult with that of bygone ceremonies. The cult of Visina corresponded with that of Baal and Rukuruku with Ashtoreth, the ancient deities signifying the creative and the productive powers of nature – e.g. ruku (the feminine) and sina (native spear grass) the masculine symbol. Thus the name Nairukuruku has a relationship and significance to the clans creative totemic symbols towards the feminine fertility.

The chiefly clan's totemic plant and animal, the Vico – native spear grass and the Vo loa – black mud fish is the living heathen symbols to the tribes masculinity and warrior class. Traditionally the Yavusa Siko is bati and protectors of the feminine totemic tribes representing fertility such as the Waimaro clan of the eastern highlands. The Siko Natabutale clan's treasured feminine Radiniwaimaro statuette in Taulevu village attests to this.

Deed of Cession Commissioner Commodore G. J. Goodenough and Reverend Frederick Langham also visited Nairukuruku on 21–22 January 1874 which was then the foremost Christianized village in the upper Wainimala river of Colo East. At Nairukuruku Goodenough makes a proclamation prohibiting white settlers the use of native Fijians especially the belligerent 'Kai Colos' as plantation slave labour. According to Siko Natabutale clan history Ratu Viliame Batiratu representing his elder brother the Taukei ni Waluvu, Ratu Meli Davetanivalu who was frail, was part of the Vunivalu of Bau, Ratu Seru Cakobau's entourage to Levuka Ovalau for cession on 10 October 1874. As a village loyal to the new religion of Christianity and later central government, Nairukuruku was a potential target for attack by non-Christian neighbours resisting Cakobau's interference in their affairs. Nairukuruku became known as na Bau ni Colo or "the Bau (island) of the highlands" due to its rise as the seat of political power. It became the call centre for all colonial visitors into the eastern highlands of Viti Levu.

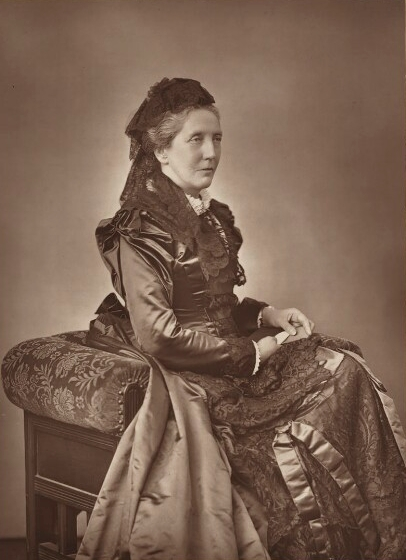
Constance Frederica Gordon-Cumming(1837–1924).

The first European females to visit Nairukuruku and indeed the highlands were writer Constance Gordon-Cumming and Reverend Fredrick Langham's wife Ann Elizabeth, who had accompanied the minister to the Christian enclave village where they spent Christmas in 1875. Ms Gordon-Cumming mused, "indeed we are the first specimens of the race whom they have seen!" During her three-day Christmas stay at Nairukuruku she also captures in her annals, a mass Christian marriage ceremony, a mass native school examination and native life in general that was coming into contact with western civilization. Her water-colour painting of Nairukuruku village and its spectacular surrounds on Christmas Day 1875 is a rare depiction of Viti Levu's eastern highlands landscape.

== Customs and traditions ==
The Taukei ni Waluvu and his subject hill tribes are warriors (bati balavu) foremost to the ancient tribal state of Verata and also to the pre-colonial states of Waimaro, Namosi and Bau. In addition with the Tui Kaba Clan of Bau, the vanua of Nabena is ‘Veitabani’ or share the same ancestors who are cross cousin related. With these pre-colonial states the Taukei ni Waluvu also has the traditional veibatiki relationship which is still extant today. The clan name Bale drokadroka illustrates the tribe's warrior status.Bale drokadroka in Fijian literally means 'to fall whilst still green'. It is also a metaphorical phrase that means 'to die young'. The name in fact valorizes a young warrior that fell in battle; hence it is a name that belongs to warrior clans. A fallen warrior may have been known by another name but because he died young the word phrase bale drokadroka eulogizes his ultimate warrior feat- to fall in battle for the cause of his tribe.

As recorded, Roraiova was renowned for spreading the clan's power through his valu ni lulu skirmishes against other hill tribes. He was the warrior chief that died young and is eulogised in Taukei ni Waluvu history. To valorize and honour Roraiova, his son in Taulevu who later took over the leadership of the clan, was bestowed the name Baledrokadroka in memory of his fallen father.

Arthur Maurice Hocart the noted anthropologist from 1909 to 1914 did field research into the kinship relationships in the highlands of Colo East and Colo West. He studied the familial relationships of Nairukuruku chief and Taukei ni Waluvu, Ratu Alipate Baledrokadroka and the neighbouring chief of Nakorosule, Tui Waimaro and published what is known today as the Principle of Alternate Generations such as the Tako-Lavo relationship of the hill tribes of Viti Levu.

Dr. Sean Sloan of JCU is the latest of scholars who in his case study of Nairukuruku Village explores the relationships among felt land scarcity, communal forces for equality, and tenure transformations in native Fijian villages. Dr. Sloan's case study is contemporary research into neo-traditional communal land issues that inevitably forces many villages to seek urban living.

In November 1979 anthropologist Dr. James W. Turner conducted a 17 month field research into Fijian customs and traditions in Nairukuruku village. He published his observations in academic journals titled: "True Food and First Fruits: Rituals of Increase in Fiji", 1984, "Owners of the Path: Cognatic Kinship Categories in Matailobau, Fiji", 1986, "The Sins of the Father: Rank and Succession in a Fijian Chiefdom", 1986, "The water of life: kava ritual and the logic of sacrifice", 1986, "Blessed to Give and Receive: Ceremonial Exchange in Fiji", 1987, "A Sense of Place: Locus and Identity in Matailobau, Fiji", 1988 and "Rituals, Habitus and Hierarchy in Fiji," 1992.

In "Rituals, Habitus and Hierarchy in Fiji", Turner studied the Fijian hierarchical system in Nairukuruku through the social interaction where the Yaqona ritual is clearly implicated in the reproduction of hierarchy reinforcing the clans status.

The Taukei ni Waluvu has a contemporary yaqona ceremony or meke ni yaqona vaka turaga only performed for a VIP on occasion. The verses are inter-changeable to suit the person in whose honour the ritualistic ceremony is being performed. Such a meke ni yaqona vaka turaga was performed for Prime Minister- the Honourable Laisenia Qarase who opened the new Vunidawa Hospital on 19 June 2002. The meke ni yaqona vakaturaga was composed and choreographed by Daunivucu Rokosuka of Taulevu village Matailobau.

== Cakobau's Christian wars ==
One of the more clearly recorded of Cakobau's Christian conversion sieges was at Nasorovakawalu. Both Ratu Cakobau and Ratu Meli were present at Nakorovatu for the final assault on the heathen stronghold across the Wainimala river. Imbued with his government's Christianization agenda, Cakobau led 1500 warriors of Matailobau, Naloto, Lomaiviti, Suva, Sabeto Nadi and even students of the Methodist Training School, Navuloa Bau to lay siege on this last heathen hill fort in the highlands. In May 1873, the stronghold was finally given up after months of siege warfare. Brewster recounts, "Heralds were sent in with strings of Whales' teeth to soro or beg his majesty's pardon and sue humbly for peace." Cakobau accepted the overtures as he thought his army had done enough for honour and glory. A local Matailobau account stated that, Ratu Cakobau had ordered his musketmen perched up trees with Snider rifles to fire volleys simultaneously in support of the final eighth assault. In celebration of this victory the bure that was built for Ratu Cakobau at Nakorovatu was given the yavu name Na- ka- u- kaya (as I ordered).

After this successful siege, in May 1873, a Christianization campaign or Valu ni Lotu was launched across the highlands of Viti Levu by Cakobau's Christian forces from Nakorovatu Matailobau which included the Taukei ni Waluvu's forces.

Ratu Viliame Batiratu, The Colo Lieutenant Governor in Cakobau's Government and later the Buli Matailobau, with his tribal army played a supporting role in Major James Harding's Wainimala pacification campaign of Muaira, Noimalu and Nagonenicolo in 1874. The belligerant tribes of the Lomai Colo led by the Vunivalu of Noemalu, Rovucago, put up sterling resistance but were finally overpowered by well drilled soldiers. The Lomai Colo tribes then sued for peace. Ratu Viliame was to play a prominent role in the administration of Colo East province as the leading Buli or 'Turaga Levu' (Great Chief), from 1874 and resigning from government services in 1896 though remaining on the payroll until 1908.

The measles epidemic of 1875 raised suspicion within the hill tribes of a foreign conspiracy given that they were still practising old native beliefs and ways. This event could be said to be the second chapter in the clash of cultures between Fijian traditional belief and western contact. Peace ensued when, on 28 October 1876, Governor Sir Arthur Hamilton-Gordon, 1st Baron Stanmore issued a proclamation pardoning all belligerent hill tribes, bringing to a close the third chapter of the clash of cultures – one of tribal versus colonial rule in the highlands of Viti Levu.

As a symbolic token of Batiratu's suzerainty, baskets of earth from the districts under his rule as Colo Governor prior to Cession from as far as Nailega on the Wainibuka river to Nagone-ni-colo on the Wainimala river, were brought to form the foundation of his great bure Vuravura at Nakorovatu.

== Colo East merges with Naitasiri ==
When the Wainimala campaign of 1874 and the "little war" of 1876 in central Viti Levu were finished, Sir Arthur Gordon thought that the lately subjugated hill tribes, were scarcely fitted then for the rigidity of British Law. He therefore caused an Ordinance to be passed in the Legislative Council of the colony to provide for the jurisdiction of the "lately disturbed districts of Viti Levu", as the preamble put it.

For administrative purposes the lately disturbed districts were divided into two provinces- Colo West and Colo East. Colo North was later carved out of these two hill provinces and Ra, Ba and Yasawa provinces in 1893. Colo East was made up of the districts of Nailega, Nasautoka, Lutu, Waima, Matailobau, Soloira, Nadaravakawalu, Muaira, Nagonenicolo, Noemalu and later Nabubuco. Nairukuruku is the leading village in Matailobau District. Ratu Viliame Batiratu-the first Buli Matailobau chose to name his district, Matailobau in recognition of the clan who gave shelter to Rokowai – the Siko Natabutale clans founding ancestor who fled the ancestral village of Navunidakua.

Map of Colo Provinces, Viti Levu, Fiji. Scale: 1:517625

In 1945, due to colonial native administrative restructure initiated by Ratu Sir Lala Sukuna, Colo East province with nine tikinas including Matailobau and Vunidawa government station as its centre was merged into Naitasiri province. The two Wainibuka tikinas of Colo East-Nailega and Nasautoka were separately joined to Tailevu province. After the provincial merger five districts or tikinas of: Naitasiri, Matailobau, Waimaro Wainimala and Lomaivuna were created. Ratu Isikeli Roraqoca the eldest grand son of Ratu Viliame Robatiratu became the Turaga Buli Matailobau from 1945 to 1962 stationed at Nakorovatu village, Vunidawa. The only reminder of the Colo East hill province at Vunidawa today is the prominent stone memorial to its illustrious son and Taukei ni Waluvu Doctor Ratu Temesia Robonowai(1866–1937) atop the government station hill.

The 1881 Gerrard Ansdell expedition of Colo East via the Wainimala and Wainibuka rivers is most revealing of all aspects of life in the hill province as many photographs were taken that is preserved in the Alexander Turnbull Library New Zealand today.

== Methodist Church – Matailobau/Wainimala Division ==
The conversion to Christianity and allegiance to Bauan hegemony came at a price for Ratu Meli Davetanivalu II and his clan. Reverend Wallace Deane in The strange adventures of a whales tooth, gives a detailed account of the tribal skirmishes of the Taukei ni Waluvu from 1862 to 1874. For amongst belligerent heathen hill tribes, the Taukei ni Waluvu and his warrior people were a major influence in the spread of Christianity and British colonialism in the hills of the main island of Viti Levu.

According to Methodist history, Reverend Thomas Baker, on his fateful journey spreading the gospel through the hills of Navosa in July 1867, passed through the Taukei ni Waluvu's Christian enclave on the east bank of the Wainimala river. In Methodist folklore, the tabua (whales tooth) sealing the plot to ambush Reverend Baker, had preceded him along the non- Christian west bank of the Wainimala river.

The alliance that Ratu Meli made with Ratu Seru Cakobau, sat oddly with his 'bati' role to Verata and blood links to other hill tribes. However this propelled him and his clan as the leading Colo East entity for Bauan, Christian and colonial domination. Davetanivalu's stronghold village Navaulele then Nairukuruku thus became the seat of the Methodist church divisional superintendent for Matailobau/Wainimala division with a lay persons training centre. Previously the Matailobau division came under the Bau division.

According to Rev. Deane, some of the Christian teachers from coastal villages who laboured spreading the gospel amongst the heathen tribes and paid the ultimate sacrifice for their faith at Navaulele were: Taitusi, from Nairai; Pita from Rewa, Rupeni from Dravo, Nafitalai from Namuka, Solomoni from Nakoroivau, Nemani, from Waikete, and Nasoni, from Buretu. Reverend Setareki Nasilivata of the warrior clan- Nawaita was Nairukuruku's first Methodist minister from 1914 to 1945.

As a glowing credit to Wesleyan mission life and village advancement at Nairukuruku in 1884, Brewester observed

About four miles further up the Wainimala from Vunidawa was Nairukuruku, the seat of Ratu Jona the native minister in charge of my province. He had a small preparatory school where aspirants for the ministry received their preliminary training. Order and discipline were combined with good native customs and the students whilst being educated, were self-supporting, maintained their own food supply and kept their houses neat and tidy. When I got hipped and bored by the life on the station, I would frequently go over to Nairukuruku and spend the day. Sometimes when Naval Officers and others visited me I took them over there to hear the students choir sing Moody and Sankey's hymns. We use to ride over and return by water for the sake of the fun of canoe travelling, shooting the rapids and getting a pot at the ducks. Ratu Jona's wife was an excellent cook, and generally regalled her guests with savory dishes of chicken stewed with yams and shallots.

Rev Ratu Jona Uluinaceva of Kadavu was native pastor of Matailobau circuit from 1881 to 1893. He was preceded by Rev Taito Rauluni (1876–1881) and Rev Rusiate Vunivalu (?-1875). Rev Jona Uluinaceva was succeeded by Reverends: Nasoni Tuisinu (1894–1903), Rev Pita Tuidela (1903–06) and Rev Filimone Waqaniveitaqavi (1906–?) respectively. Distinguished graduates of Nairukuruku preparatory school were Taukei ni Waluvu Doctor Ratu Temesia Robonowai (1866–1937) who was one of the first Fijian native medical practitioners in 1888, Doctor Ratu Jone Roraiova (1904–34) and Doctor Ratu Waisea Radibi (1901–32).

In 1885, the fiftieth anniversary of Methodism in Fiji, a prominent contingent of Australian Methodists visited Nairukuruku to witness first hand the spread of Christianity in the highlands of Fiji. In addition to church festivities, they were treated to a spectacle of native dances and an insight into hill people tribal culture by the Taukei ni Waluvu and Buli Matailobau Ratu Viliame Batiratu.

== Cultivation and Viti Kabani ==
In the 1900s, the surrounding Nairukuruku river plains were cultivated with bananas as the major cash crop. The village banana farmers became exponents of the Viti Kabani movement and the quest by its enigmatic founder Apolosi Ranawai for native indigenous commercial enterprise against the wishes of colonial administrators. Ranawai had founded his company at Nakorovatu, Matailobau, where in 1912, as a carpenter he was building a church. Ratu Esira Rovucago V (1870–1934) of Nairukuruku was the secretary for the Viti Kabani in Colo East at the height of its popularity from 1913 to 1917. With the demise of the banana industry many villagers left to seek employment in the gold mines of Vatukoula and the tourism industry of western Viti Levu. Today subsistence market farming is the major village income earner with many families having left for urban living.

== Mythological ancestry ==
Dr Paul Geraghty of the University of the South Pacific in his field research compiled and translated into English, mythological ancestry stories of certain tribes from parts of Fiji. Amongst his works, Dr Geraghty in tracing Fijian tribal origins meticulously recorded and translated the story of the 'Great Drought in the West of Viti Levu'. The story captured the birth of the great ancestor of the Taukei ni Waluvu – Robonowai. He was the son of Ranadi ni Namasia the daughter of Tui Nalawa.

== Title holder ==
As chief of Matailobau district, the Taukei ni Waluvu, Ratu Meli Koroitamana who replaced his cousin Ratu Alipate Baledrokadroka (1933–2005) was traditionally installed on 22 March 2008. He is a retired airport ground staff and sat on Fiji's Great Council of Chiefs when it was in operation. He is a former Fiji rugby representative of the 1964 tour of UK and France. Ratu Alipate was a pioneering Fijian scholar of the newly established Marist Brothers High School, Suva in 1949. He was one of the first Fijian students to matriculate in the Senior Cambridge exams in 1952 following his father Dr Ratu Jone Raiova (1904–33) footsteps, who matriculated from Marist St John's college, Cawaci on Ovalau Island in 1922, to the Central Medical School, Suva. Ratu Meli died on 7 October 2009 after a short illness. He has been succeeded by his brother Ratu Jese Rokotunivono who presently holds leadership of the clan.

Ratu Alipate MBHS Student 1949. Taukei ni Waluvu, (1997–2005) as Form III student Marist Brothers High School, Suva, 1949.

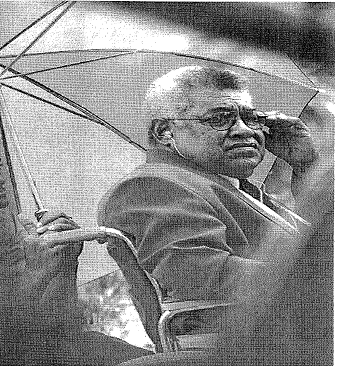
Ratu Alipate at Naitasiri Provincial Council Meeting, Navuso, 2000 where the Naitasiri SDL political party was first formed. He was also a founder of the St John Cawaci Rugby Club in 1964 and later St John Marist Rugby Club Suva in 1969

The chiefly households of: Nakamarusi, Vuravura, Dakui, Navaulele, Nadawadamana, Nasirivatu, Navakabatiyavu, Nakacadakui, Navunisalusalu and Nacagabuli decides on the title holder who usually is the oldest male in the Siko Natabutale clan of Nairukuruku village. The choice of leadership through this exclusive traditional system is under pressure due to the changes in village life and culture brought about by modernity. Today's communal quest for development and good governance demands leaders have good education and integrity.

== Past title holders ==
(in order of succession)

Vunivalu Taukei Waiburebure

- Robonowai I (Nalawa)
- Rokowai I (Navunidakua and c.1600 A.D. Nakamarusi)
- Nayacakuru (Navunidakua)
- Rokotokalau
- Iranaqarikau
- Iranabobo I(Ulira)
- Rodavetanivalu (Taulevu)
- Roraiova I,(Valu ni Lulu- Navaulele)
- Rovucago (Navaulele)
- Ratu Manasa Davetanivalu (Ulira)
- Radibi (Navaulele)
- Robaledrokadroka I, (Taulevu)

Vunivalu Vuniduba

- Ratu Asaeli Tabuavula

Vunivalu Taukei ni Waluvu

- Ratu Meli Davetanivalu II, Navaulele (?-1875).
- Ratu Viliame Robatiratu I(?-1908) (Taukei Vuravura, Buli Colo East, GCC Member)
- Ratu Isikeli Rorinabobo Davetanivalu (GCC Member)
- Ratu Alipate Baledrokadroka II, (Taukei Navaulele)
- Ratu Samu Ranarogo (1855–1931).
- Dr. Ratu Temesia Robonowai II, NMP, (Taukei Nakamarusi, 1866–1937, GCC Member)
- Ratu Taito Rauluni (1880–1948).
- Ratu Manasa Davetanivalu II,(1893–1944, GCC Member)
- Ratu Isikeli Roraqoca (Buli Matailobau) (1906–62, GCC Member)
- Ratu Anare Roraqoca (1903–74, GCC Member)
- Ratu Joseva Koroitamana (1909–87).
- Ratu Esira Rovucago VI(1911–77).
- Ratu Emosi Vakatawabai (1915–79, GCC Member)
- Ratu Jope Rokowai (1923–97, GCC Member)
- Ratu Alipate Raiova Baledrokadroka IV, (1933–2005, Taukei Nacagabuli, Senator, GCC Member)
- Ratu Meli Ronaiteqe Koroitamana (1935–2009, GCC Member)
- Ratu Jese Romokidawa Rokotunivono, 1940- (GCC member)

== Prominent Yavusa Siko persons ==
- Ratu Meli Davetanivalu II Taukei ni Waluvu, First Colo Chief converted to Christianity (?-1875).
- Ratu Viliame Batiratu, Buli Matailobau, leading Colo East Chief. GCC member(?-1908).
- Ratu Isikeli Ranabobo Davetanivalu, Buli (1887–1897).
- Ratu Waisele Rokorainima, Buli (1898–?)
- Mr William Scott, European Settler.
- Mr Henry Scott, European.
- Dr. Ratu Temesia Robonowai, NMP. GCC Member. (1866–1937).
- Dr. Ratu Waisea Radibi, NMP.
- Dr. Ratu Jone Roraiova, MP. (1904–34).
- Ratu Isikeli Roraqoca, Buli Matailobau, GCC Member.
- Ratu Viliame Batiratu, World War II Solomon Is Veteran.
- Ratu Asaeli Tabuavula, World War II Solomon Is Veteran.
- Ratu Isikeli Radrugale, World War II Solomon Is Veteran.
- Ratu Alipate Baledrokadroka III, Vatukoula Mines Union and Naitasiri Community Rep.
- Rev. Setareki Nasilivata, Methodist Minister.
- Rev Josaia Raikoso, Methodist Minister 1915-1945
- Semi Nate, 1920-40s Heavyweight Champion Boxer of Fiji and the Pacific, Native Magistrate.
- Inspector Ratu Leone Lautabui, Fiji rugby rep, Heavyweight boxer, First native gazetted Police Officer, Author of the Sherlock Holmes of Fiji.
- Major Josefa S George, Military Officer, 1FIR Malaya, Company Commander and NLC Officer.
- Colonel Livai Nasilivata, Military Cross,1FIR Malaya, Govt Minister, Senator, Teacher.
- Inoke Nasilivata, Teacher, Nausori Town Councillor.
- Superintendent P. Turaga, Police Officer.
- Sgt Ratu Asesela Rokotulou, World War II, US Silver Star medal.
- Emori Naqova- CEO Telecom Fiji.
- Ratu Alipate Baledrokadroka IV, (1933–2005) Accountant, Senator, GCC Member.
- Ratu Meli Koroitamana, Fiji Rugby Rep to UK 1964, GCC Member.
- Adi Kelera Royalotama Nasilivata, (1937–2007) Teacher.
- Ratu Jope Rorinabobo, Head Teacher Vunidawa.
- Ratu Meli Rinakorovatu, ex-Tuirara Matailobau Wainimala division.
- Ratu Emosi Rosakuwai – USP Administrator, Founder Naitasiri Rugby- Suva, Nasinu, Kalabu Zone.
- Adi Lagamu Takiveikata, President Naitasiri Soqosoqo vaka Marama, Businesswomen, Senator.
- Colonel Dr Ratu Jone Baledrokadroka Roraiova, Founding President Naitasiri Rugby Union(1998–2002), GCC Member, UNDP Advisor.
- Ratu Jope Paul Baledrokadroka, Dean, Kelston Boys High, Auck, NZ.
- Adi Vasiti Baledrokadroka, FNU Senior Lecturer.
- Peniasi Nasilivata – Min of Planning and Finance.
- Setareki Nasilivata – Army SNCO.
- Ratu Jemesa Baledrokadroka, Reserve Bank Fiji Lawyer.
- Ratu Jope Davetanivalu, SPREP Advisor.
- Ratu Emosi Davetanivalu, Min. Planning and Finance.
- Adi Vani Nasedra, Teacher.
- Isoa Nasedra, Ast Native Lands Commissioner.
- Eroni Tubuitamana, Teacher.
- Atunaisa Tabua, Ast Roko Naitasiri.
- Adi Kelera Baledrokadroka, Agriculturist.
- Ratu Feretariki Naqaliwai, Teacher.
- Ratu Manasa Davetanivalu, British Army NCO, UK.
- Ratu Levani. Rosovalevu, Nurse.
- Mikaele Aciriciri Turaga, Journalist.
- Akusita. Nasilivata, Teacher.
- Superintendent Jeremaia Raikoso (First Native Fijian to be appointed as Police Superintendent and Nausori Town Councillor)
