= Sigatoka River =

River in Fiji

Coordinates: 18.1756°S 177.52°E

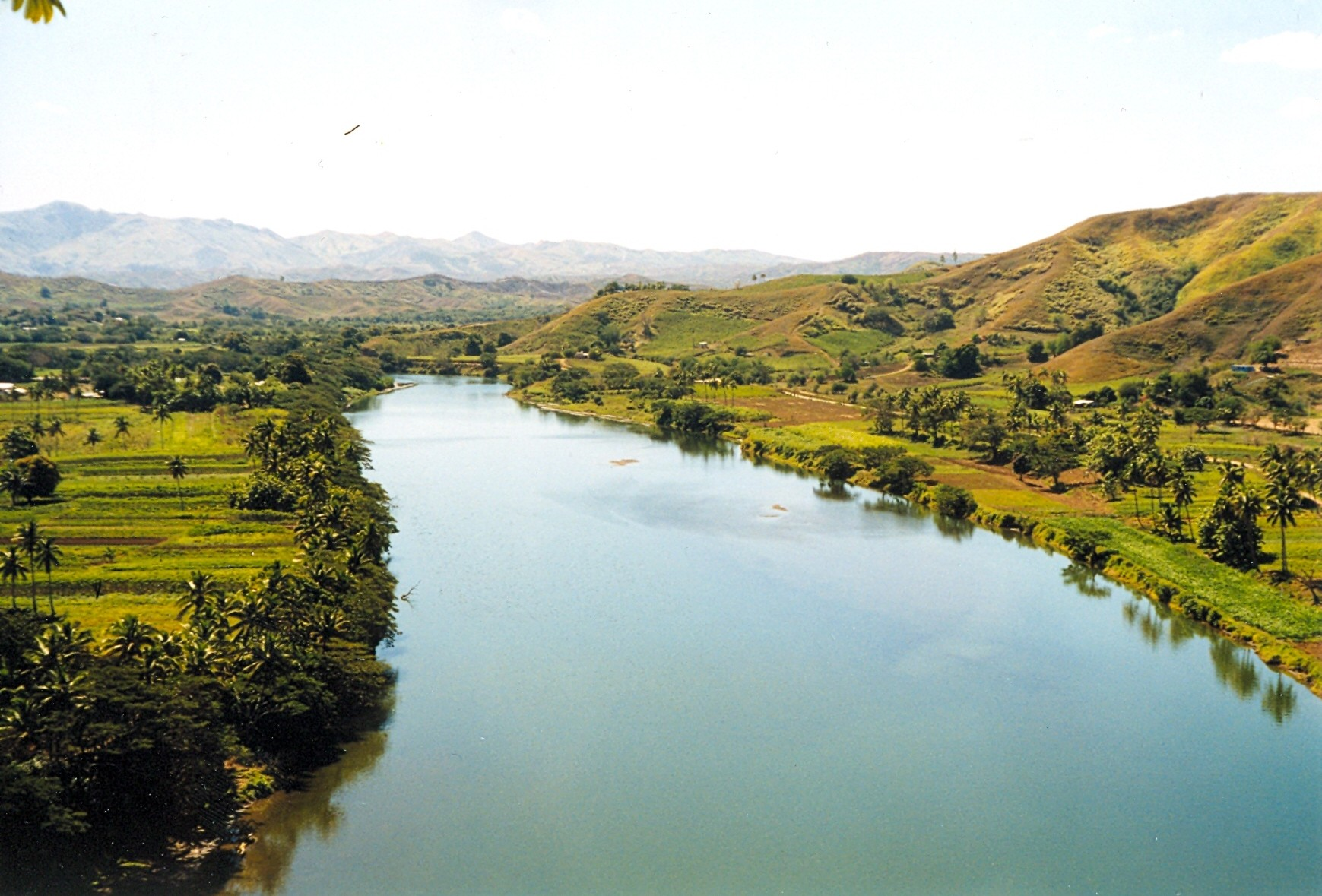
Sigatoka River

The Sigatoka River is in the island of Viti Levu in Fiji and has its source on the west side of Mount Victoria and flows for 120 kilometers to the coast between the central and western ranges. It is the chief means of transportation with some parts of the interior of the island.

The Sigatoka Sand Dunes are at the mouth of the river, and the Nadarivatu Dam was completed in 2012 in its headwaters.

== History ==
Sigatoka River was historically the only means of transport from the Fijian coast to the island's lush interior. The river provided locals for fisheries, as well as water for agriculture and drinking.

During the Colo Wars, the valley around the Sigatoka River became a bastion for hill tribes who resisted British rule.

From 1912 to 1923, banana plantations in the Sigatoka River Valley suffered severe episodes of a fungal infection called Mycosphaerella musicola, also known as the Yellow Sigatoka disease.

Since 2006, the Sigatoka River is still used for jet-boat excursions in one of the world's first village safaris.
