= Monasavu Dam =

Dam in Naitasiri Province, Fiji

- Location within Fiji
- Country: Fiji
- Location: Naitasiri Province
- Coordinates: 17°45′23.95″S 178°03′00.57″E
- Purpose: Power
- Status: Operational
- Construction began: May 1978
- Opening date: 1983; 43 years ago
- Construction cost: US$234 million
- Owner: Fiji Electricity Authority

Dam and spillways
- Type of dam: Embankment, rock-fill
- Impounds: Nanuku River
- Height: 60 m (200 ft)
- Length: 200 m (660 ft)

Reservoir
- Creates: Monasavu Reservoir
- Total capacity: 133,000,000 m^{3} (108,000 acre⋅ft)

Wailoa Hydro Power Station
- Coordinates: 17°44′10.22″S 178°06′06.18″E
- Commission date: 1983
- Hydraulic head: 625 m (2,051 ft)
- Turbines: 4 x 20 MW (27,000 hp) Pelton-type
- Installed capacity: 80 MW (110,000 hp)

Monosavu Catchment
- IUCN category VI (protected area with sustainable use of natural resources)
- Interactive map of Monosavu Catchment
- Location: Viti Levu, Fiji
- Nearest city: Suva
- Area: 7.06 km^{2} (2.73 sq mi)
- Established: 2004

The Monasavu Dam is a rock-fill embankment dam on the Nanuku River about 60 kilometres (37 mi) northwest of Suva in Naitasiri Province, Fiji. It is located just above the Monasavu Falls and is both the tallest and largest dam, which also withholds the largest reservoir in the country. The primary purpose of the dam is to produce hydroelectric power and it supports an 80 megawatts (110,000 hp) power station. To offset fossil fuel imports for power production on the island, the Monasavu-Wailoa Hydroelectric Project was authorized by the Fiji Electricity Authority in 1977 and construction began in May 1978. The dam was complete and power station commissioned in 1983. About US$15 million of the project's total US$234 million cost was supplied by the World Bank, the rest by the host government and loans.

The dam, protection of its catchment and rainforest contribute to its national significance as outlined in Fiji's Biodiversity Strategy and Action Plan.

== Wailoa Hydro Power Station ==
Water from the dam is diverted through nearly 5.4 kilometres (3.4 mi) of tunnels to the Wailoa Hydro Power Station to the east on the Wailoa River. The power station contains four 20 megawatts (27,000 hp) Pelton turbine-generators and the drop in elevation between the reservoir and power station affords a hydraulic head (water drop) of about 625 metres (2,051 ft). In 1992, the power station was supplying 92% of Viti Levu's, the main Fiji island, power. This share dropped to 49% in 2006 due to growing power demand.

== Climate ==
Climate data for Monasavu Dam (elevation 808 m (2,651 ft), 1991–2020 normals)
Month	Jan	Feb	Mar	Apr	May	Jun	Jul	Aug	Sep	Oct	Nov	Dec	Year
Mean daily maximum °C (°F)	25.8 (78.4)	26.0 (78.8)	26.0 (78.8)	24.7 (76.5)	23.1 (73.6)	22.2 (72.0)	21.4 (70.5)	21.7 (71.1)	22.4 (72.3)	23.4 (74.1)	24.4 (75.9)	25.1 (77.2)	23.9 (75.0)
Daily mean °C (°F)	22.5 (72.5)	22.8 (73.0)	22.8 (73.0)	21.8 (71.2)	20.3 (68.5)	19.5 (67.1)	18.6 (65.5)	18.7 (65.7)	19.3 (66.7)	20.1 (68.2)	21.1 (70.0)	22.0 (71.6)	20.8 (69.4)
Mean daily minimum °C (°F)	19.2 (66.6)	19.6 (67.3)	19.6 (67.3)	18.9 (66.0)	17.5 (63.5)	16.8 (62.2)	15.7 (60.3)	15.7 (60.3)	16.2 (61.2)	16.9 (62.4)	17.8 (64.0)	18.8 (65.8)	17.7 (63.9)
Average precipitation mm (inches)	664.5 (26.16)	509.8 (20.07)	502.3 (19.78)	477.0 (18.78)	314.1 (12.37)	238.4 (9.39)	193.9 (7.63)	244.6 (9.63)	288.8 (11.37)	416.7 (16.41)	431.9 (17.00)	642.0 (25.28)	4,924 (193.9)
Average precipitation days (≥ 1.0 mm)	24.9	22.9	24.8	22.9	18.7	17.9	16.3	16.7	17.4	19.8	21.8	23.7	247.8
Source: World Meteorological Organization

== See also ==
- Nadarivatu Dam
