= Naitasiri District =

Naitasiri
- Tikina (District)
- Country: Fiji
- Province: Naitasiri

Population (2017)
  - Total: 160,002

Naitasiri District is a district in Naitasiri Province, Central Division, Fiji. At the 2017 census it had a population of 160,002.
