= Nadarivatu Dam =

- Location within Fiji
- Country: Fiji
- Location: Nadarivatu District, Nadroga-Navosa Province
- Coordinates: 17°40′02.66″S 177°56′29.14″E
- Purpose: Power
- Status: Operational
- Construction began: 2009
- Opening date: 2012; 14 years ago
- Construction cost: US$150 million
- Owner: Fiji Electricity Authority

Dam and spillways
- Type of dam: Gravity
- Impounds: Sigatoka River
- Height (foundation): 40 m (130 ft)
- Height (thalweg): 32 m (105 ft)
- Length: 75 m (246 ft)
- Dam volume: 36,000 m^{3} (47,000 cu yd)
- Spillway type: Controlled overflow, three radial gates

Reservoir
- Total capacity: 1,009,000 m^{3} (818 acre⋅ft)
- Active capacity: 244,000 m^{3} (198 acre⋅ft)

Nadarivatu Hydro Power Station
- Coordinates: 17°40′39.72″S 177°54′46.17″E
- Commission date: 7 September 2012
- Hydraulic head: 335.7 m (1,101 ft)
- Turbines: 2 x 20.85 MW (27,960 hp) Pelton-type
- Installed capacity: 41.7 MW (55,900 hp)
- Annual generation: 101 GWh (360 TJ)

The Nadarivatu Dam, also known as the Korolevu Dam, is a concrete gravity dam on the upper reaches of the Sigatoka River in Nadarivatu District of Nadroga-Navosa Province, Fiji. The primary purpose of the dam is to generate hydroelectric power in a 41.7 megawatts (55,900 hp) run-of-the-river scheme. The Nadarivatu Hydropower Scheme was first identified in 1977 during a hydropower study. Detailed plans for the project were developed in 2002 and major construction began in 2009. The power station was commissioned on 7 September 2012 but an inauguration ceremony led by Prime Minister Frank Bainimarama was held a week later on 14 September. Funding and loans for the project was provided by several organizations to include the China Development Bank (US$70 Million), Fiji Electricity Authority bonds (US$50 million), ADZ Bank (US$30 million). The 40 m (130 ft) tall dam diverts water from the Sigatoka River through a 3,225 metres (10,581 ft) long headrace/penstock tunnel to a power station along the Ba River to the southwest. The power station contains two 20.85 megawatts (27,960 hp) Pelton turbine-generators. The drop in elevation between the reservoir and the power station affords a gross hydraulic head (water drop) of 335.7 metres (1,101 ft).

== See also ==
- Monasavu Dam
