= Naitasiri Province =

Province of Fiji

Coordinates: 17°50′S 178°15′E

- Province
- Interactive map of Naitasiri Province
- Country: Fiji
- Division: Central Division

Area
  - Total: 1,666 km^{2} (643 sq mi)

Population (2017)
  - Total: 177,771
  - Density: 106.7/km^{2} (276.4/sq mi)

Naitasiri is one of the 14 provinces of Fiji and one of eight located on Viti Levu, Fiji's largest island. It is located in Central Division.

== Geography and infrastructure ==
Naitasiri covers an area of 1,666 square kilometres (643 mi^{2}), and occupies the area mostly to the north of Suva, the capital. Its boundaries stretch across Viti Levu in a southeast to northwest direction from Laucala Bay on the Suva Peninsula to beneath Mt Tomanivi, Fiji's highest mountain on the Nadrau Plateau ("Mai na toba ko Laucala ki na ruku i Tomanivi" in Fijian).

Naitasiri's natural resources include the Medrausucu mountain ranges, vast indigenous forests, five river systems and fertile agricultural land. The Monasavu Dam sits astride its Wainimala headwaters and Nadrau plateau.

Prior to roads being built, the five rivers that flow through the province, the Wainibuka, Wainimala, Waidina, Waimanu and the Rewa were the main avenues of travel and communications. Hence many villages in the province were situated along rivers. Public infrastructure works since the 1960s include the Sawani-Serea road, the Naqali-Namosi road, a new bridge and hospital at Vunidawa, roadworks and sealing of the main Sawani to Naluwai road, bridge constructions at Navuso across the Waimanu River and Naqali across the Waidina River. The Suva to Monasavu road opened much of the Wainimala hinterland in the late 1970s. The construction of the Vunidawa bridge has also opened up the Matailobau District hinterland since 2000.

== Economy ==
The Colonial Sugar Refining Company built a sugar mill at Viria, Lomaivuna where it crushed from 1886 to 1895. It was closed because it was too small to be viable and the land was taken over by white planters and graziers. Until the 1960s the province was the centre of the banana export industry centred on Lomaivuna, Waidina and Wainimala. Dairy farming and market and export produce farming i.e. ginger and dalo drive the economy from areas such as Waibau Waidruso, Lomaivuna, Vunidawa, Muaniweni, Baulevu and Waila. The Rewa Dairy Co Ltd has a Chilling Station at Naluwai. Indigenous timber logging has increased with the construction of feeder road networks since 2000. The successful Lutu village produce export enterprise and the Province's business arm, the Voko Fish Ltd have pride of place in Indigenous business nationally.

== Politics and history ==
Naitasiri is governed by a Provincial Council, chaired by Ratu Ilaitia Tuisese. Its provincial center is at the rural town and government station of Vunidawa in Matailobau District.

In 1945 the hill province of Colo East was joined to Naitasiri province in a colonial native administration restructure. The province's people are renowned for their fiercely independent and warrior (bati) character. The earliest recorded white contact with Colo hill tribes is credited to Rev Williams in 1858. However, it was after Reverend Frederick Langham, the Wesleyan minister journeyed to Christianize the Taukei ni Waluvu in 1862 that more coastal and white contact became regular. In 1867 on his fateful journey to Christianize hill tribes in Colo West, Rev. Thomas Baker also travelled through Naitasiri and Colo East. Baron Anatole Von Hugel, also explored the Province in his journey through Namosi and Waimaro in 1875–77.

On 22 January 1875 at Navuso, Naitasiri, colonial administrators along with Ratu Cakobau and his two sons who had returned from Sydney, Australia briefed some eight-hundred hill chiefs and their tribal retinues on the implications of Fiji's new status as a Colony. Ratu Cakobau and his two sons had been sick with measles on the trip back to Levuka. With no quarantine laws in place, they inadvertently carried with them the disease from aboard HMS Dido to Navuso. The measles epidemic that befell Fiji in 1875 from January to about June 1875 and wiped out 30 per cent or 50,000 of its indigenous population was a tragedy of the first order.

Cakobau's Christianization campaigns of heathen hill tribes in 1873 were followed by colonial pacification campaigns launched by Governor Sir Arthur Gordon in the Colo Provinces of Viti Levu in 1875. This was brought to a close in 1876 with a pardoning of belligerent hill tribes. Colonial administrator AB Brewster in the 1880s in his book "The Hill Tribes of Fiji" provided the first ethnological study of the Province's hill people.

The province's traditional political allegiance is with the Kubuna Confederacy of Bau as cemented with the Vunivalu of Bau Ratu Seru Cakobau's eldest daughter's marriage to the Qaranivalu of Naitasiri. The other prominent chiefs of the province are the Taukei ni Waluvu of Matailobau and Tui Waimaro of Waimaro.

The formation of the political party Soqosoqo Duavata ni Lewenivanua (SDL) after the May coup of 2000 was on the initiative of the chiefs and people of Naitasiri. The SDL party won both the 2001 and 2006 national political elections. However, in December 2006 it was deposed by a military coup d'état.

== Demographics ==
Its population at the last census in 2017 was 177,771, making Naitasiri the country's second most populous province after Ba Province.

Its main urban area is the burgeoning town of Nasinu, with a population of 87,446 at the 2007 census. Nasinu Town includes the suburbs of Waila, Makoi, Nasinu, Kalabu, Tovata, Kinoya, Laqere, Nadera, Nepani, Nadawa, Valelevu, Nakasi, and Naveiwakau. Newer Suburbs of Suva City, such as Samabula North, Tamavua, Namadi, Tacirua, Wailoku, Cunningham and Khalsa sit within Naitasiri's borders. (Suva City's CBD and older suburbs lie in the adjoining Rewa Province). The province contains 96 villages.

=== 2017 Census ===
Tikina (District)	Ethnicity						Total
Tikina (District)	iTaukei	%	Indo-Fijian	%	Other	%	Total
Lomaivuna	4,993	92.2	361	6.7	60	1.1	5,414
Matailobau	3,976	98.7	34	0.8	17	0.4	4,027
Naitasiri	92,883	58.1	60,482	37.8	6,637	4.1	160,002
Waimaro	4,073	99.3	16	0.4	12	0.3	4,101
Wainimala	4,198	99.3	5	0.1	24	0.6	4,227
Province	110,123	61.9	60,898	34.3	6,750	3.8	177,771

== Notable people ==
=== Politicians ===
- Adi Baledrokadroka (former Senator)
- Asaeli Masilaca
- Solomone Naivalu (Soqosoqo Duavata ni Lewenivanua Party President)
- Timoci Natuva ( former Cabinet Minister)
- Asesela Ravuvu (academic and Senator)
- Peceli Rinakama (school principal, politician)
- Inoke Takiveikata, the Qaranivalu (Paramount Chief) of Naitasiri Province, former Government Minister and Senator)
- Ilaitia Tuisese (former Cabinet Minister)

=== Sport ===
- Keni Dakuidreketi - chairman, Fiji Rugby Union
- Mosese Nailumu - former national rugby representative and businessman
- Nasoni Roko - rugby
- Koli Sewabu - rugby
- Waisale Vatuvoka - rugby
- Mosese Luveitasau - former national 15 and 7 rugby representative.
- Apenisa Tokairavua - former national rugby representative and boxing champion.
- Veramu Dikidikilati - former assistant police commissioner and national boxing representative.
- Paula Waisake - former national 7s, 15s, and World Rugby 15 representative.
- Atonio Racika - (Toni) former national rugby 15s representative.
- Jone Naqica - Former USA Eagles, USA 7s Captain

=== Other ===
- Jone Baledrokadroka - Former Military officer and academic
