= Jokapeci Koroi =

Fijian politician

Jokapeci Talei Koroi (1932 – 12 July 2011) was a Fijian politician. She served as the President of the Fiji Labour Party and a Senator. She was appointed to the Senate in 2002 as one of 8 nominees of the Leader of the Opposition, Mahendra Chaudhry.
