= Matailobau District =

Coordinates: 17°49′35.68″S 178°17′36.2″E

Matailobau
- Tikina (District)
- Interactive map of Matailobau
- Country: Fiji
- Province: Naitasiri

Population (2017)
  - Total: 4,027

Matailobau District is a district in Naitasiri Province, Central Division, Fiji. In the past the district consisted of the old tikinas (sub districts) of Nagonenicolo, Matailobau, Waima and Lutu until their separation due to Fijian administration restructure in the 1990s. The old tikina and present district of Matailobau consists of the villages of Nairukuruku, Navuniyasi, Taulevu, Delaitoga, Nabena and Matailobau. It had a population of 4,027 at the 2017 Census.
