= Qaranivalu =

The Qaranivalu is a senior Chief of Naitasiri Province in Fiji.

The Qaranivalu from 1997 until his death in 2025 was Ratu Inoke Takiveikata. He had played the role of facilitator of the Muanikau Accord between the Fijian military and coup leader George Speight and his group in July 2000, which ended the 58-day parliament hostage crisis. However he was imprisoned in December 2004 for life for his alleged role in the Fiji military mutiny of November 2000. Ratu Inoke was released from prison after the Fiji Court of Appeal overturned the sentencing judgement by Justice Anthony Gates and ruled a mistrial in June 2007.

== Chiefly authority ==
The Qaranivalu exercises direct chiefly authority over the villages of Navuso, Tamavua, Kalabu, Nacokaika, Kasavu, Vuniniudrovu, Naganivatu, Nakini, Natowaika, Deladamanu, Waitolu, and Drekeiwaila, and is considered the overlord of the Roko Tui Vuna, the traditional ruler of the villages of Sawani, Navatuvula, and Colo-i-Suva. According to some sources, this chiefly title is the most senior in the Province of Naitasiri.

== A brief history ==
The Qaranivalu descends from the most senior line of the Vunivalu of Bau, Ratu Seru Epenisa Cakobau through the Vunivalu's daughter, Adi Arieta Kuila, who married the Qaranivalu at the time, Ratu Timoci Vakaruru. It was during this time that the traditional geographical borders of Naitasiri were redrawn to include the villages of Kasavu, Nabu (inhabitants now residing in Kasavu together with the Yavusa Nawainovo, Yavusa Sawa and Burenitu), Natoaika and Deladamanu. These villages were formerly under the dominion of the Ratu of Verata, Kasavu traditionally being the leading village among the group. These villages are now known as the kai vale of the Qaranivalu.
