= Peceli Rinakama =

Fijian politician

Peceli Rinakama is a former politician in Fiji. He served as a member of the Parliament of Fiji from 1999 to 2001.

== 2000 coup and aftermath ==
Rinakama was elected to Parliament in the 1999 election, representing the constituency of Naitasiri for the Fijian Association Party. During the 2000 Fijian coup d'état, he joined the Cabinet of George Speight. As a result, he was refused entry to New Zealand in 2003 due to his involvement in the coup. Following the coup, he switched his allegiance to the Conservative Alliance, but failed to win re-election in the 2001 election.

In 2003, he alleged that the Soqosoqo ni Vakavulewa ni Taukei (SVT) party was behind the 2000 coup, and that it had plotted to overthrow the government of Mahendra Chaudhry even before it took office. Shortly afterwards he was charged with taking an unlawful oath for purporting to join Speight's Cabinet, and in 2004 he was convicted and sentenced to three years imprisonment. He was granted early release for good behaviour in December 2005, having served half his sentence.

In 2005 it was alleged that Rinakama had benefitted from a US$13 million fraud in the agriculture ministry in 2001.

In November 2007, Rinakama was one of ten people arrested and charged with conspiring to assassinate Fijian dictator Frank Bainimarama. All charges against him were withdrawn in December of that year.

On 5 March 2010 Rinakama was abducted by soldiers from a house in Suva. He has not been seen since, and there are fears he has been disappeared. On 11 March 2010, the Fijian government admitted that Rinakama was in custody, though they would not say where or what for. On 12 March, they claimed he had been released.

Rinakama ran as a candidate for SODELPA at the 2018 Fijian general election. During the campaign he praised the 1987 coup. He ran as a People's Alliance candidate at the 2022 election, winning 1007 votes.
