= Ilaitia Tuisese =

Fijian politician (1946/1947–2024)

Ilaitia Bulidiri Tuisese (1946/1947 – 5 October 2024) was a Fijian rugby union player, business executive, politician, and Cabinet Minister. He was a former captain of the Fiji national rugby union team and later served in Prime Minister Laisenia Qarase's Cabinet from 2000 to 2006. He was chair of the board of the Fiji Sun.

Tuisese first played for the Fijian national rugby union team in a match against Wales in Suva in 1969. In 1970 he was part of the team which toured the USA. His last appearance was against the British Lions in 1977. He later went on to captain and coach the Fiji national rugby sevens team.

Tuisese was appointed Minister for Regional Development and Minister for Multi-Ethnic Questions in the interim government that was formed in July 2000 in the wake of the failed Fiji coup of 2000, which deposed the elected government of Prime Minister Mahendra Chaudhry before being quashed by the Military. In the election held to restore democracy in September 2001, he won the Naitasiri Fijian Communal Constituency for the Soqosoqo Duavata ni Lewenivanua Party (SDL), and was subsequently appointed Minister for Agriculture, Sugar, and Land Resettlement. He retained his parliamentary seat in the parliamentary election held on 6–13 May 2006, and was subsequently appointed Minister for Fisheries and Forests, which he retained until the military coup of 5 December 2006.

Following the coup he retired from politics, and did not contest the 2014 election.

In February 2019 he was inducted into the Fijian Rugby Hall of Fame. In April 2019 he was made a life member of the Fiji Rugby Union. In November 2020 he was made an Officer of the Order of Fiji.

Tuisese died on 5 October 2024, at the age of 77.
