= Jone Baledrokadroka =

Fijian academic

Jone Baledrokadroka (born 9 November 1958 in Suva, Fiji) is a Fijian academic and former soldier who served briefly as Republic of Fiji Military Forces Land Force Commander in January 2006. He was dismissed from the post after only four days after RFMF Commander Frank Bainimarama accused him of planning a mutiny. He is the son of former senator and Taukei ni Waluvu Ratu Alipate Baledrokadroka and the brother of Senator Adi Lagamu Vuiyasawa. He is also the uncle for New Zealand netballer Erikana Pedersen.

Degree Qualifications: • PhD (ANU) Politics, 2012. • Master of Arts Strategic Studies (Deakin University), 2003 • Post Grad Dip Strat and Defence (Universiti Malaya) 1995

Senior Defence/ Security Qualifications: • Graduate of Centre for Defence Strategic Studies Canberra Australia, 2003. • Graduate Malaysian Military Staff College 1995. • Fellow of US Asia Pacific Centre for Strategic and Security Studies Hawaii 2001 • Fellow of Australian Army Land Warfare Centre Canberra ACT.2005. • Graduate of US Naval School Senior Management Course Monterey 2005.

Expertise: • Pacific Regional Political Strategic and Security Analyses in particular Melanesia. • UN Peace and Development Advisor in PNG and Bougainville,.

== Early life ==
Baledrokadroka is from the village of Nairukuruku in Naitasiri Province. He was educated at the Marist Brothers High School in Suva and De La Salle College, Māngere East, before attending Auckland University of Technology, where he studied civil engineering.

== Military career ==
Baledrokadroka joined the Army in 1981 and was commissioned after attending the OCTU Officers commissioning course in Fiji. He commanded the Engineers Regiment, MFO Fijibatt XVII and was Chief Staff Officer Operations during the 2000 Political Crisis prior to his appointment as Acting Land Force Commander. Baledrokadroka had attended the Defence and Strategic Studies Course at the Australian Defence College, Canberra, in 2003.

On 10 January 2006 Baledrokadroka assumed the position of Land Force Commander. He was relieved of the position and sent on leave four days later after a disagreement with RFMF Commander Frank Bainimarama. Bainimarama subsequently accused him of planning a mutiny and of plotting with Home Affairs chief executive Lesi Korovavala to remove him; Baledrokadroka claimed that Bainimarama had given instructions for illegal and treasonous acts. Bainimarama subsequently appointed a board of inquiry to investigate the matter, but Baledrokadroka refused to cooperate.

In April 2006 the RFMF announced that Baledrokadroka would face a court-martial. Baledrokadroka fled to New Zealand. The lack of an extradition treaty between Fiji and New Zealand meant that he could not be extradited to face a court-martial.

In September 2006 Fiji's Public Service Commission shortlisted him for a job as Commissioner of Corrections, causing tensions with the military. The military repeatedly threatened to court-martial Baledrokadroka if he was appointed, and appointed a prosecutor. Ultimately the Commission was not satisfied with either candidate, and Baledrokadroka was not appointed. The army finally suspended its investigation in January 2007 in the aftermath of the 2006 Fijian coup d'état.

== Post-military ==
In November 2007 he was arrested alongside his brother -in-law Ratu Inoke Takiveikata and businessman Ballu Khan and accused of being part of a plot to assassinate Bainimarama. He was subsequently charged with inciting mutiny and conspiracy to murder. After being imprisoned for 40 days, he was granted bail. In November 2008, when granting a permanent stay of proceedings against Khan, the High Court of Fiji raised doubts about the evidence against Baledrokadroka. The charges were subsequently dropped in December 2008.

Following his acquittal, Baledrokadroka moved to Australia and applied for asylum. He studied for a PhD in politics at Australian National University. His thesis, completed in 2012, was on Sacred king and warrior chief : the role of the military in Fiji politics, and called for reform of the Fijian military and its ethos to ensure subservience to civilian authority. He also campaigned against the military regime from Australia, and was an organiser of the Fiji Democracy and Freedom movement. In 2012, in the leadup to the general elections scheduled for 2014, the first since the 2006 coup, he expressed scepticism about whether the Military would allow the vote to be free and fair. "The path in this progress towards democracy has been fraught with allegations of continuing military oversight and interference in the constitution-making process," he wrote in an Australian National University journal. "And it is possible that the new Constitution, once it has been finalised by Bainimarama’s handpicked Constituent Assembly, might become a setback to democracy by spawning a military backed one-party state."

He served as UN Peace Development Advisor in Bougainville in 2015-19.

In April 2023 he was appointed by Fiji's newly-elected coalition government to head a review into restoring the Great Council of Chiefs.

In August 2023 he was also appointed chairman of Naitasiri Provincial Council.

He was also founding President of Naitasiri Rugby Union (1998-2003).

In April 2024 he was appointed head of the Team to Review the ITaukei Administration Act 1944.

He is also Consultant for UN/Fiji Peacebuilding and Social Cohesion Project launched in March 2024.
