= Mount Tomanivi =

Volcanic mountain in Fiji

- Location within Fiji

Highest point
- Elevation: 1,324 m (4,344 ft)
- Prominence: 1,324 m (4,344 ft)
- Listing: Country high point Ribu
- Coordinates: 17°37′59″S 178°01′00″E

Geography
- Location: Fiji

Geology
- Rock age: 150 million

Mount Tomanivi, previously named Mount Victoria and also known as Tomaniivi, is an extinct volcano located in the northern highlands of Viti Levu. At 1,324 metres (4,344 ft), Mount Tomanivi is the highest mountain in Fiji. A trail leads to the summit of Tomanivi from the village of Navai. The main river systems, the Rewa, Navua, Sigatoka, and Ba, all have their headwaters in the central mountain area.

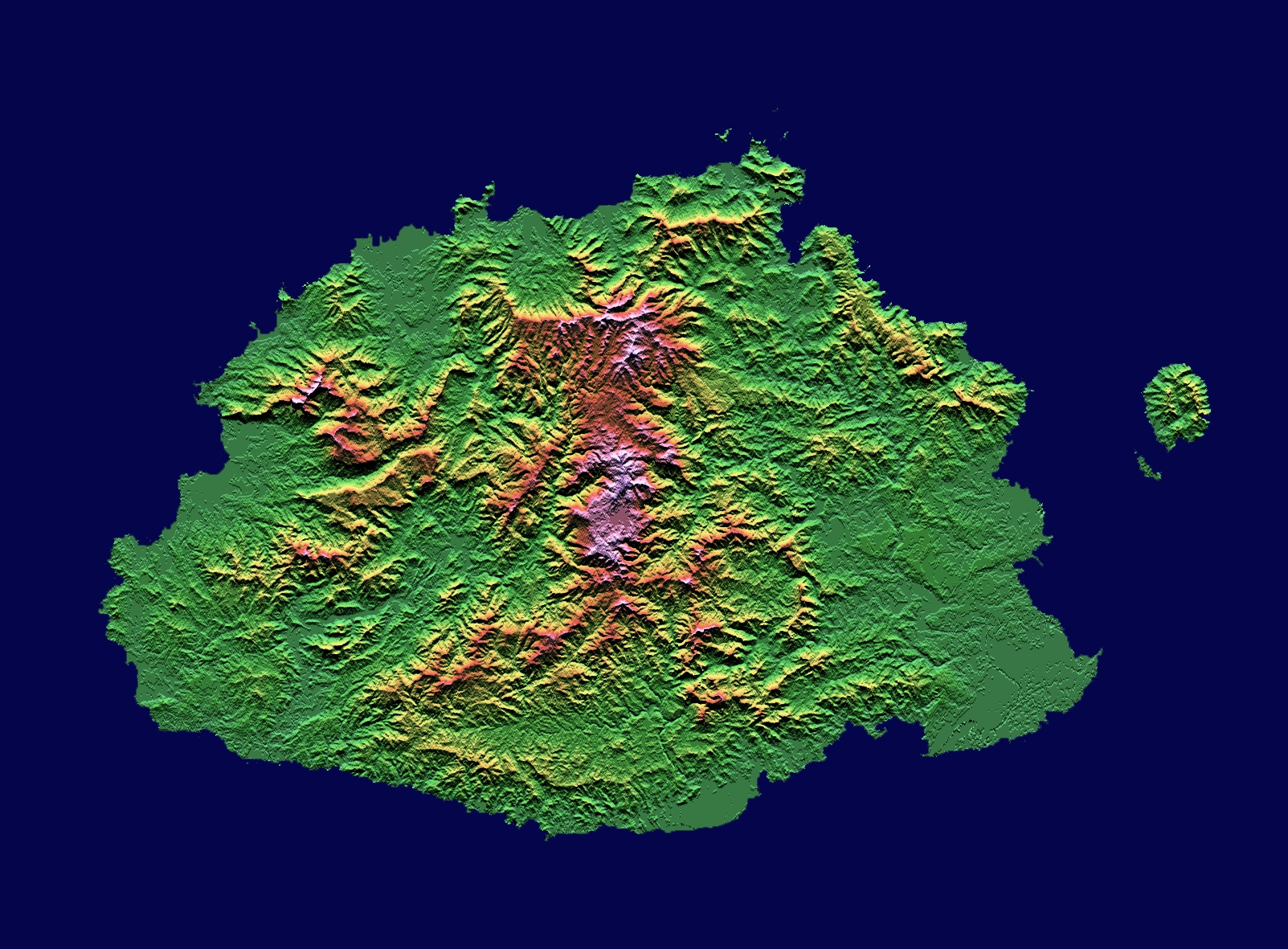
Mount Tomanivi on the island of Viti Levu Topography

Tomanivi contains a significant proportion of the highest-altitude montane forest in Fiji. This is an important habitat for birds and other biodiversity. A 17,500 hectares (43,000 acres) area covering the slopes of Tomanivi is the Greater Tomaniivi Important Bird Area. The Important Bird Area combines Tomaniivi Nature Reserve and Wabu Forest Reserve with other contiguous forests to form a single forest block. It is seen as the best hope for the critically endangered red-throated lorikeet surviving anywhere in the world. It also supports populations of endangered long-legged warblers, and the vulnerable shy ground-dove and pink-billed parrotfinch.
