= Fiji Live =

Fijian online newspaper and business and cultural directory

FijiLive is an online news portal covering local and political news, sports, business, entertainment (general) and international news. The site is owned by Webmasters Pte Limited.

FijiLive rose to prominence in May 2000 during the nationalist coup orchestrated by George Speight. While communication links with the outside world were cut off by the coup plotters, FijiLive was one of the few sources of news to reach the international audience. Since 2003 the site has undergone a massive transformation with a focus on news (local and political), sports (rugby and football) and business.

== See also ==
- Culture of Fiji
