= Lesi Korovavala =

Fijian civil servant

Lesi Korovavala is a former Fijian civil servant, who served as the chief executive officer of the Ministry for Home Affairs.

Korovavala is a former senior Republic of Fiji Military Forces officer who trained at Officer Cadet School, Portsea and served as a peacekeeper with the United Nations Interim Force in Lebanon, the Multinational Force and Observers in the Sinai Peninsula, and the South Pacific Peacekeeping Force on Bougainville Island. He was also aide-de-camp to President Ratu Penaia Ganilau for a time. He later studied at Lancaster University, where he graduated with a Master of Arts in Defence and Security Analysis and a PhD in political science.

In 2003 he retired from the RFMF with the rank of lieutenant colonel in order to become a public servant, becoming Deputy then Secretary for Home Affairs and Immigration. He had a strained relationship with RFMF commander (and later dictator) Commodore Frank Bainimarama. In March 2004 Bainimarama accused Korovavala and several other senior public servants of being a threat to national security. In June 2005 Korovavala ordered Bainimarama to end the military's public relations campaign against the government's Reconciliation, Tolerance, and Unity Bill. The order was ignored. In December 2005 Bainimarama blamed Korovavala for delays in convening a court martial to retry 20 members of the Counter Revolutionary Warfare Unit who had mutinied during the 2000 Fijian coup d'état, and publicly threatened to remove him so as to gain direct access to Home Affairs Minister Josefa Vosanibola. On 28 December Bainimarama sent soldiers to occupy his office. In January 2006 Bainmarama again demanded Korovavala's removal, accusing him of attempting to incite a military mutiny against him. Korovavala was subsequently investigated by the Public Service Commission, but cleared of all charges in May 2006. The military also convened its own board of inquiry, but Korovavala refused to cooperate.

In November 2006 Korovavala was suspended indefinitely for missing meetings of the National Security Council. He was subsequently removed from office by the 2006 Fijian coup d'état and banned from leaving the country. Despite this, he managed to escape to the Solomon Islands, where he took up a job as representative of the Pacific Islands Forum Secretariat. He then worked for the United Nations High Commissioner for Refugees and the International Organization for Migration.
