= National Security Council (Fiji) =

The National Security Council is, as its name indicates, the Republic of Fiji's national security council.

It was established in 1990, through the Fiji Intelligence Service Decree, by the interim government which followed the 1987 coups d'état. The Council's purpose was to "determine and direct the action to be taken in respect of matters affecting the sovereignty, integrity and security of Fiji and its people".

In 2006, under the government of Prime Minister Laisenia Qarase, it "consist[ed] largely of government members", with "the police and the army only attend[ing] through invitation". Following the December 2006 military coup, the new government-established National Council for Building a Better Fiji recommended that the National Security Council "incorporate wider membership - including the military and police, civil society organisations, women's organisations, academic institutions and community groups".

== See also ==
- Fiji Intelligence Services
