= Inoke Takiveikata =

Fijian high chief and politician (1947–2025)

Ratu Inoke Takiveikata (28 July 1947 – 13 April 2025) was a Fijian high chief and politician. From 1997 he held the title of Qaranivalu, a senior chiefly title in Naitasiri Province. He served in the interim Cabinet of Prime Minister Laisenia Qarase as Minister for Regional Development and Multi-ethnic Affairs, in 2000 and 2001, when he was appointed to the Senate and sworn in on 14 September. Takiveikata died on 13 April 2025 at the age of 77.

Takiveikata was convicted of instigating the 2000 Fijian coup d'état, but was given a pardon from President Ratu Wiliame Katonivere in December 2023.
