= Fiji =

Country in Oceania

Republic of Fiji Matanitu Tugalala o Viti (Fijian) फ़िजी गणराज्य; Fijī Gaṇarājya (Hindi)
- Flag Coat of arms
- Motto: "Rerevaka na Kalou ka Doka na Tui" (Fijian) "Fear God and honour the King"
- Anthem: "God Bless Fiji"
- Capital and largest city: Suva; 18°10′S 178°27′E
- Official languages: English; Fijian; Hindi
- Recognised regional languages: Rotuman
- Recognised languages: Fiji Hindi
- Ethnic groups (2016): 56.8% Indigenous Fijians; 37.5% Indo-Fijians; 1.2% Rotumans; 4.5% others
- Religion: 64.4% Christianity; 34.6% Methodism; 29.8% other Christian; 27.9% Hinduism; 6.3% Islam; 1.4% others / none
- Demonym: Fijian
- Government: Unitary parliamentary republic
  - President: Naiqama Lalabalavu
  - Prime Minister: Sitiveni Rabuka
  - Deputy Prime Minister: Viliame Gavoka
  - Parliament Speaker: Filimone Jitoko
  - Chief Justice: Salesi Temo
- Legislature: Parliament

Independence from the United Kingdom
  - Independence: 10 October 1970
  - Republic: 6 October 1987
  - Current constitution: 6 September 2013

Area
  - Total: 18,274 km^{2} (7,056 sq mi) (151st)
  - Water (%): negligible

Population
  - 2018 estimate: 926,276 (161st)
  - 2017 census: 884,887
  - Density: 46.4/km^{2} (120.2/sq mi) (148th)
- GDP (PPP): 2023 estimate
  - Total: ▲$15.152 billion (158th)
  - Per capita: ▲$16,563 (102nd)
- GDP (nominal): 2023 estimate
  - Total: ▲$5.511 billion (164th)
  - Per capita: ▲$6,024 (106th)
- Gini (2019): ▼30.7 medium inequality
- HDI (2023): ▲0.731 high (111th)
- Currency: Fijian dollar (FJD)
- Time zone: UTC+12 (FJT)
- Date format: dd/mm/yyyy
- Calling code: +679
- ISO 3166 code: FJ
- Internet TLD: .fj

Fiji, (Note: Fijian: Viti, Fijian pronunciation: [ˈβitʃi], Fiji Hindi: फ़िजी, romanised: Fijī (/ˈfiːdʒi/ FEE-jee, /fiːˈdʒiː/ fee-JEE; Fijian: Viti, [ˈβitʃi]; Fiji Hindi: फ़िजी, Fijī)) officially the Republic of Fiji, (Note: Fijian: Matanitu Tugalala o Viti) is an archipelagic country in the Melanesia region of Oceania, in the South Pacific Ocean. It lies about 1,100 nautical miles (2,000 km; 1,300 mi) north-northeast of New Zealand. Fiji consists of an archipelago of more than 330 islands—of which about 110 are permanently inhabited—and more than 500 islets, amounting to a total land area of about 18,300 square kilometres (7,100 sq mi). The most outlying island group is Ono-i-Lau. About 87% of the total population live on the two major islands, Viti Levu and Vanua Levu. About three-quarters of Fijians live on Viti Levu's coasts, either in the capital city of Suva, or in smaller urban centres such as Nadi (where tourism is the major local industry) or Lautoka (where the sugar-cane industry is dominant). The interior of Viti Levu is sparsely inhabited because of its terrain.

The majority of Fiji's islands were formed by volcanic activity starting around 150 million years ago. Some geothermal activity still occurs today on the islands of Vanua Levu and Taveuni. The geothermal systems on Viti Levu are non-volcanic in origin and have low-temperature surface discharges of between roughly 35 and 60 degrees Celsius (95 and 140 °F).

Humans have lived in Fiji since the second millennium BC: first Austronesians and later Melanesians, with some Polynesian influences. Europeans first visited Fiji in the 17th century. In 1874, after a brief period in which Fiji was an independent kingdom, the British established the Colony of Fiji. Fiji operated as a Crown colony until 1970, when it gained independence and became known as the Dominion of Fiji. In 1987, following a series of coups d'état, the military government that had taken power declared it a republic. In a 2006 coup, Commodore Frank Bainimarama seized power. In 2009, the Fijian High Court ruled that the military leadership was unlawful. At that point, President Ratu Josefa Iloilo, whom the military had retained as the nominal head of state, formally abrogated the 1997 Constitution and re-appointed Bainimarama as interim prime minister. Later in 2009, Ratu Epeli Nailatikau succeeded Iloilo as president. On 17 September 2014, after years of delays, a democratic election took place. Bainimarama's FijiFirst party won 59.2% of the vote, and international observers deemed the election credible.

Fiji has one of the most developed economies in the Pacific, based mainly on tourism but also on exports deriving from its abundant forest, mineral, and fish resources. The currency is the Fijian dollar, with the main sources of foreign exchange being the tourist industry, remittances from Fijians working abroad, bottled water exports, and sugar cane. The Ministry of Local Government and Urban Development supervises Fiji's local government, which takes the form of city and town councils.

== Etymology ==
The name of Fiji's main island, Viti Levu, served as the origin of the name "Fiji", though the common English pronunciation is based on that of Fiji's island neighbours in Tonga. An official account of the emergence of the name states:

Fijians first impressed themselves on European consciousness through the writings of the members of the expeditions of Cook who met them in Tonga. They were described as formidable warriors and ferocious cannibals, builders of the finest vessels in the Pacific, but not great sailors. They inspired awe amongst the Tongans, and all their Manufactures, especially bark cloth and clubs, were highly valued and much in demand. They called their home Viti, but the Tongans called it Fisi, and it was by this foreign pronunciation, Fiji, first promulgated by Captain James Cook, that these islands are now known.

"Feejee", the Anglicised spelling of the Tongan pronunciation, occurred in accounts and other writings by missionaries and other travellers visiting Fiji until the late 19th century.

== History ==
=== Early settlement ===
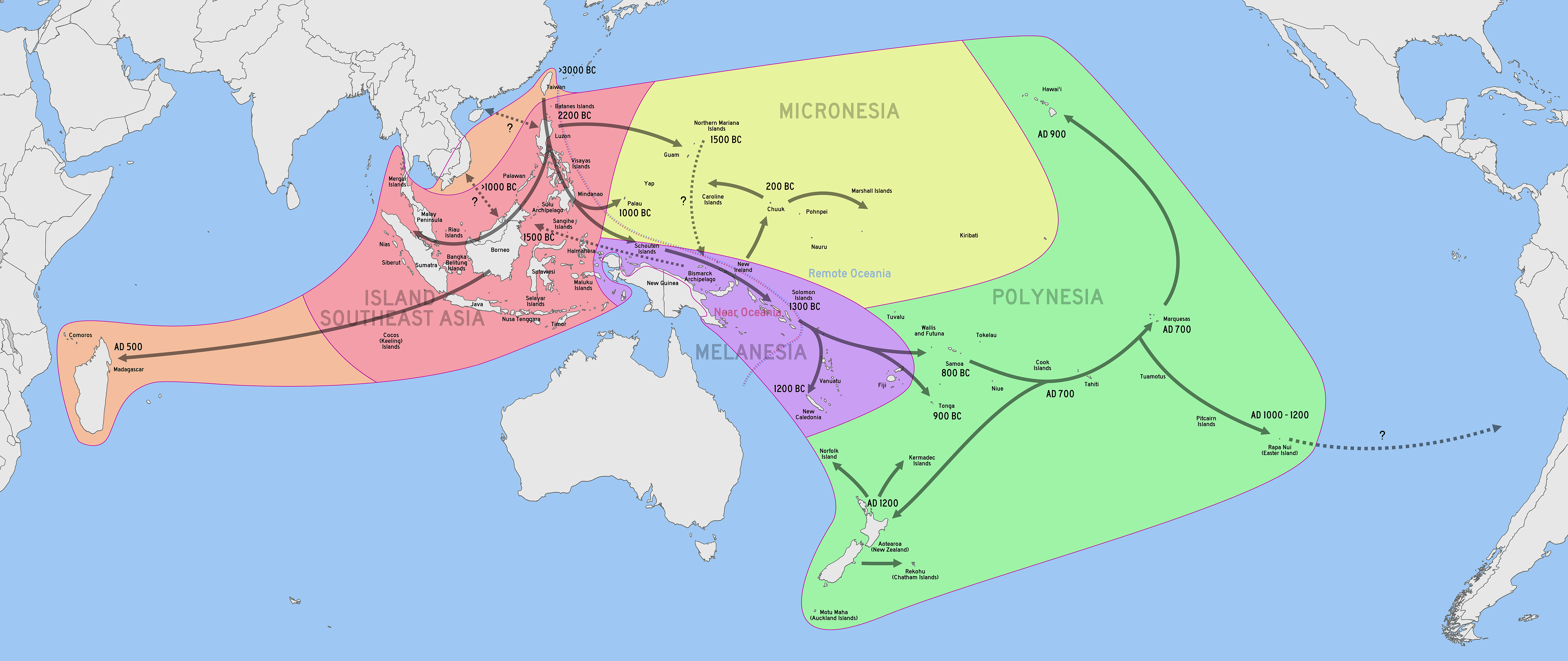
Map showing the migration and expansion of the Austronesians, beginning c. 3000 BC from Taiwan

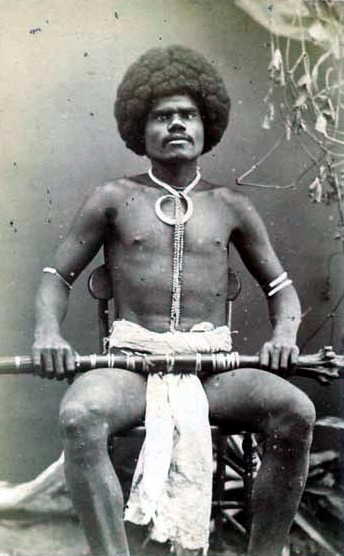
A Fijian mountain warrior. Photograph by Francis Herbert Dufty, 1870s

Pottery art from Fijian towns shows that Fiji was settled by Austronesian peoples by at least 3500 to 1000 BC, with Melanesians following around a thousand years later, although there are still many open questions about the specific dates and patterns of human migration. It is believed that either the Lapita people or the ancestors of the Polynesians settled the islands first, but not much is known of what became of them after the Melanesians arrived; the old culture may have had some influence on the new one, and archaeological evidence shows that some of the migrants moved on to Samoa, Tonga and even Hawai'i. Archeological evidence also shows signs of human settlement on Moturiki Island beginning at least by 600 BC and possibly as far back as 900 BC. Although some aspects of Fijian culture are similar to the Melanesian culture of the western Pacific, Fijian culture has a stronger connection to the older Polynesian cultures. The evidence is clear that there was trade between Fiji and neighbouring archipelagos long before Europeans made contact with Fiji.

In the 10th century, the Tu'i Tonga Empire was established in Tonga, and Fiji came within its sphere of influence. The Tongan influence brought Polynesian customs and language into Fiji. That empire began to decline in the 13th century.

Fiji has long had permanent settlements, but its peoples also have a history of mobility. Over the centuries, unique Fijian cultural practices developed. Fijians constructed large, elegant watercraft, with rigged sails called drua and exported some to Tonga. Fijians also developed a distinctive style of village architecture, consisting of communal and individual bure and vale housing, and an advanced system of ramparts and moats that were usually constructed around the more important settlements. Pigs were domesticated for food, and a variety of agricultural endeavours, such as banana plantations, existed from an early stage. Villages were supplied with water brought in by constructed wooden aqueducts. Fijians lived in societies led by chiefs, elders and notable warriors. Spiritual leaders, often called bete, were also important cultural figures, and the production and consumption of yaqona was part of their ceremonial and community rites. Fijians developed a monetary system where the polished teeth of the sperm whale, called tambua, became an active currency. A type of writing existed that can be seen today in various petroglyphs around the islands. Fijians developed a refined masi cloth textile industry, and used the cloth they produced to make sails and clothes such as the malo and the liku. As with most other ancient human civilisations, warfare or preparation for warfare was an important part of everyday life in pre-colonial Fiji. The Fijians were noted for their distinctive use of weapons, especially war clubs. Fijians used many different types of clubs that can be broadly divided into two groups, two handed clubs and small specialised throwing clubs called ula.

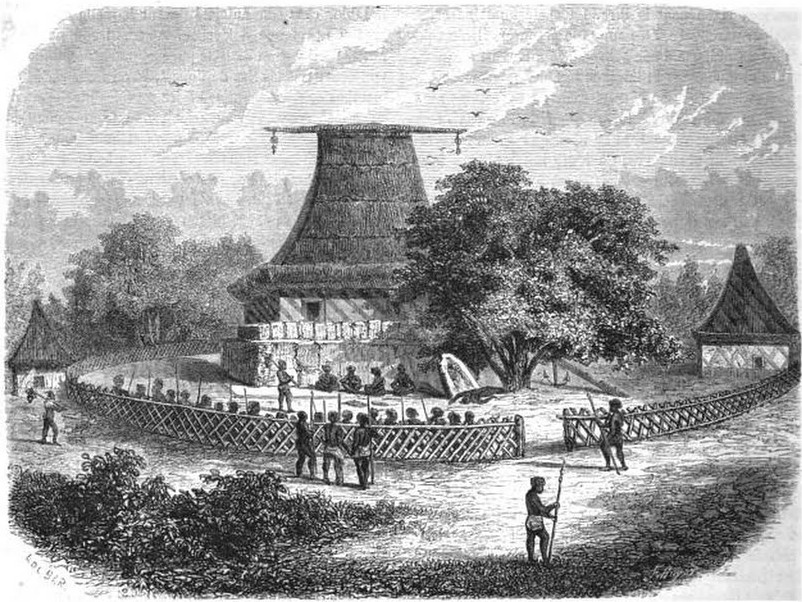
Bure-kalou or temple

With the arrival of Europeans in the 17th century, and European colonisation in the late 19th century, many elements of Fijian culture were either repressed or modified to ensure European – specifically, British – control. This was especially the case with respect to traditional Fijian spiritual beliefs. Early colonists and missionaries utilised and conflated the concept of cannibalism in Fiji to give a moral imperative for colonial intrusion. Europeans labelled many native Fijian customs as debased or primitive, enabling colonists to see Fiji as a "paradise wasted on savage cannibals". Such representations formed part of a wider colonial discourse that associated cannibalism with savagery and lawlessness and could be used to justify punitive actions.

Nineteenth-century accounts of Fijian cannibalism varied considerably in detail and reliability. Missionaries such as Thomas Williams recorded accounts of cannibalism and related practices, while non-missionary visitors also reported the practice. During colonial times, Fiji was known as the Cannibal Isles. Deryck Scarr subsequently cited 19th-century accounts describing "freshly killed corpses piled up for eating" and ceremonial mass human sacrifice on the construction of new houses and boats. The accuracy and extent of some of these accounts have been disputed by later scholars. For example, anthropologist William Arens questioned the reliability of colonial historical accounts entirely. However, modern archaeological studies by Degusta, Cochrane, and Jones have since produced physical evidence consistent with cannibalistic practices at several Fijian sites. A more restrained contemporary account was given by William MacGregor, the long term chief medical officer in British colonial Fiji. During the Little War of 1876, he stated that the rare occasion of tasting of the flesh of the enemy was done "to indicate supreme hatred and not out of relish for a gastronomic treat".

=== Early interaction with Europeans ===
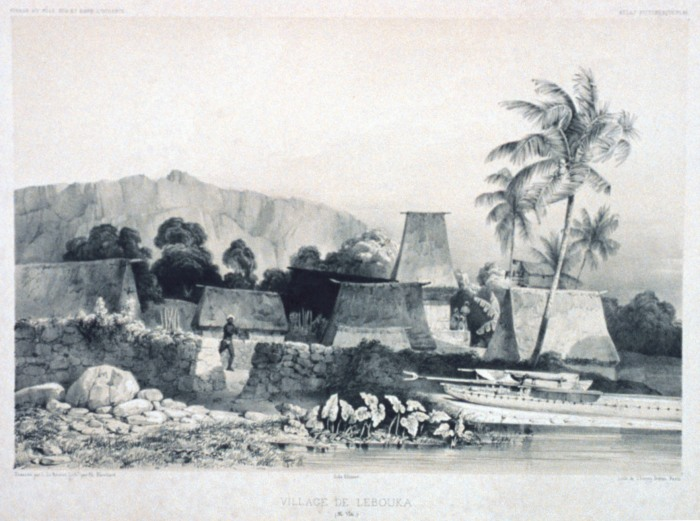
Levuka, 1842

Dutch explorer Abel Tasman was the first known European visitor to Fiji, sighting the northern island of Vanua Levu and the North Taveuni archipelago in 1643 while looking for the Great Southern Continent.

James Cook, the British navigator, visited one of the southern Lau islands in 1774. It was not until 1789, however, that the islands were charted and plotted, when William Bligh, the castaway captain of HMS Bounty, passed Ovalau and sailed between the main islands of Viti Levu and Vanua Levu en route to Batavia, in what is now Indonesia. Bligh Water, the strait between the two main islands, is named after him and for a time, the Fiji Islands were known as the Bligh Islands.

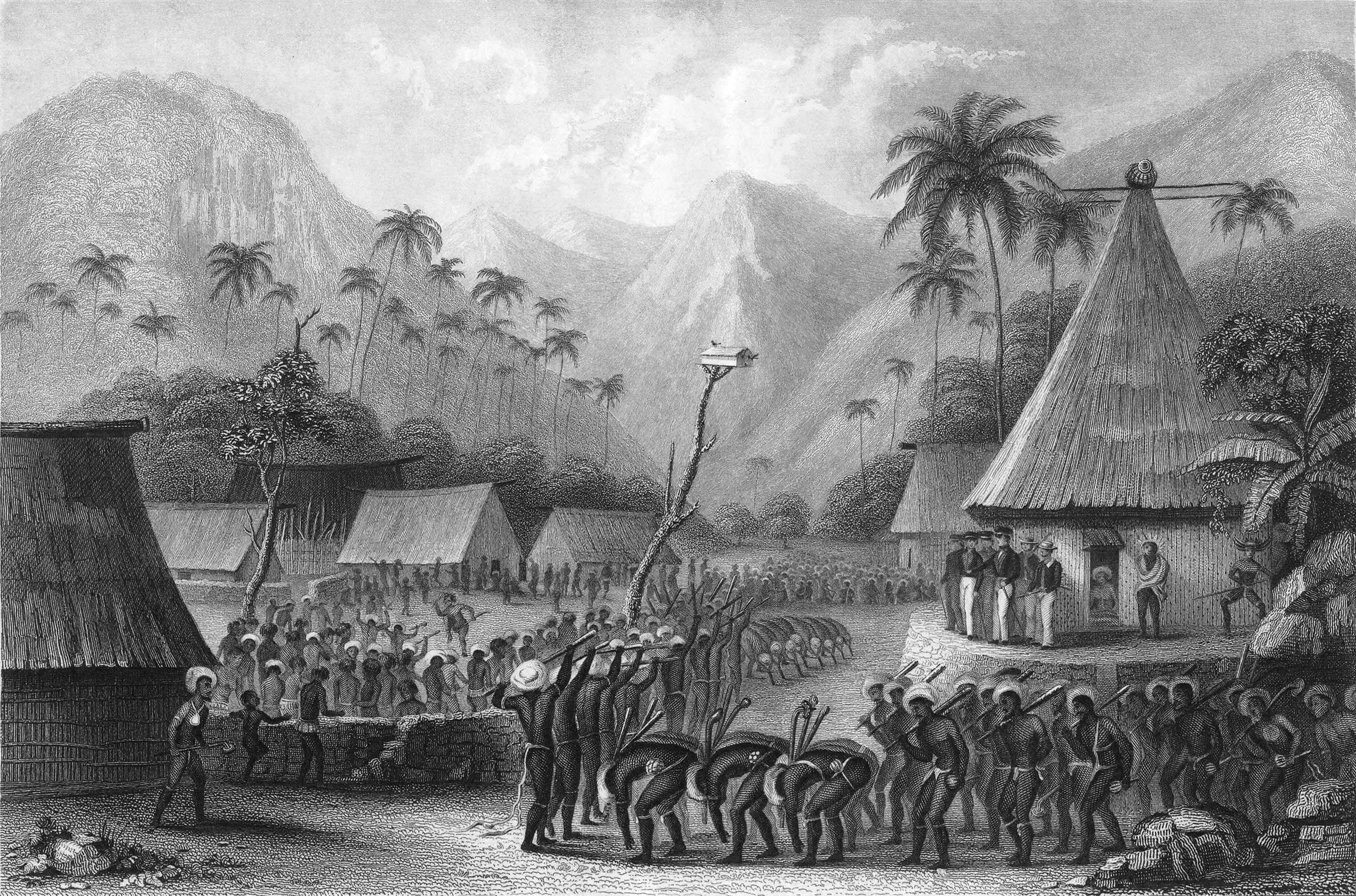
The first Europeans to land and live among the Fijians were shipwrecked sailors like Charles Savage

The first Europeans to maintain substantial contact with the Fijians were sandalwood merchants, whalers and "beche-de-mer" (sea cucumber) traders. The first whaling vessel known to have visited was the Ann and Hope in 1799, and she was followed by many others in the 19th century. These ships came for drinking water, food and firewood and, later, for men to help man their ships. Some of the Europeans who came to Fiji in this period were accepted by the locals and were allowed to stay as residents.

By the 1820s, Levuka was established as the first European-style town in Fiji, on the island of Ovalau. The market for "beche-de-mer" in China was lucrative, and British and American merchants set up processing stations on various islands. Local Fijians were utilised to collect, prepare and pack the product which would then be shipped to Asia. A good cargo would result in a half-yearly profit of around $25,000 for the dealer. The Fijian workers were often given firearms and ammunition as an exchange for their labour, and by the end of the 1820s most of the Fijian chiefs had muskets and many were skilled at using them. Some Fijian chiefs soon felt confident enough with their new weapons to forcibly obtain more destructive weaponry from the Europeans. In 1834, men from Viwa and Bau were able to take control of the French ship L'amiable Josephine and use its cannon against their enemies on the Rewa River, although they later ran it aground.

Christian missionaries like David Cargill also arrived in the 1830s from recently converted regions such as Tonga and Tahiti, and by 1840 the European settlement at Levuka had grown to about 40 houses with former whaler David Whippey being a notable resident. The religious conversion of the Fijians was a gradual process which was observed first-hand by Captain Charles Wilkes of the United States Exploring Expedition. Wilkes wrote that "all the chiefs seemed to look upon Christianity as a change in which they had much to lose and little to gain". Christianised Fijians, in addition to forsaking their spiritual beliefs, were pressured into cutting their hair short, adopting the sulu form of dress from Tonga and fundamentally changing their marriage and funeral traditions. This process of enforced cultural change was called lotu. Intensification of conflict between the cultures increased, and Wilkes was involved in organising a large punitive expedition against the people of Malolo. He ordered an attack with rockets which acted as makeshift incendiary devices. The village, with the occupants trapped inside, quickly became an inferno with Wilkes noting that the "shouts of men were intermingled with the cries and shrieks of the women and children" as they burnt to death. Wilkes demanded the survivors should "sue for mercy" and if not "they must expect to be exterminated". Around 57 to 87 Maloloan people were killed in this encounter.

=== Cakobau and the wars against Christian infiltration ===
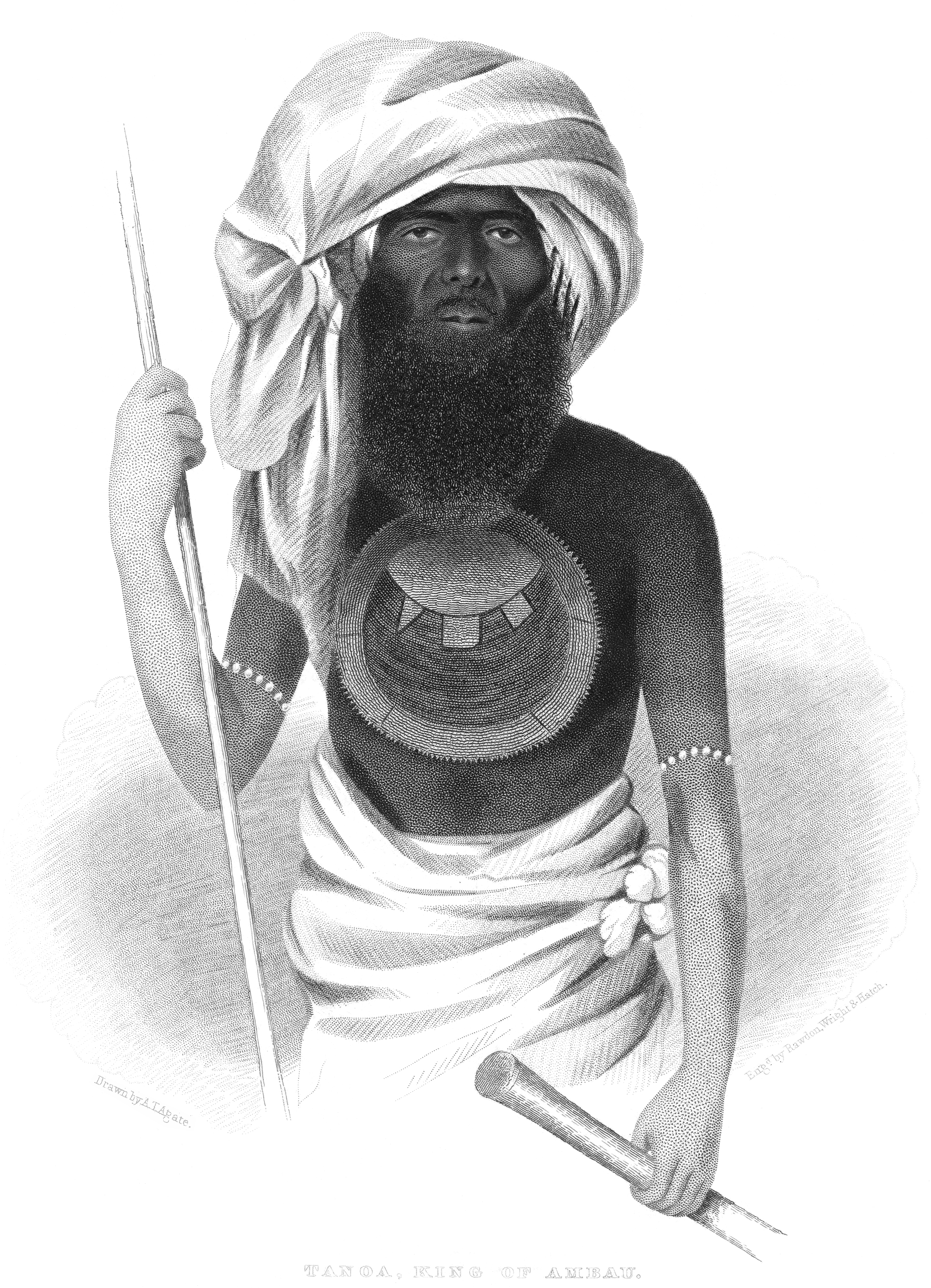
Ratu Tanoa Visawaqa

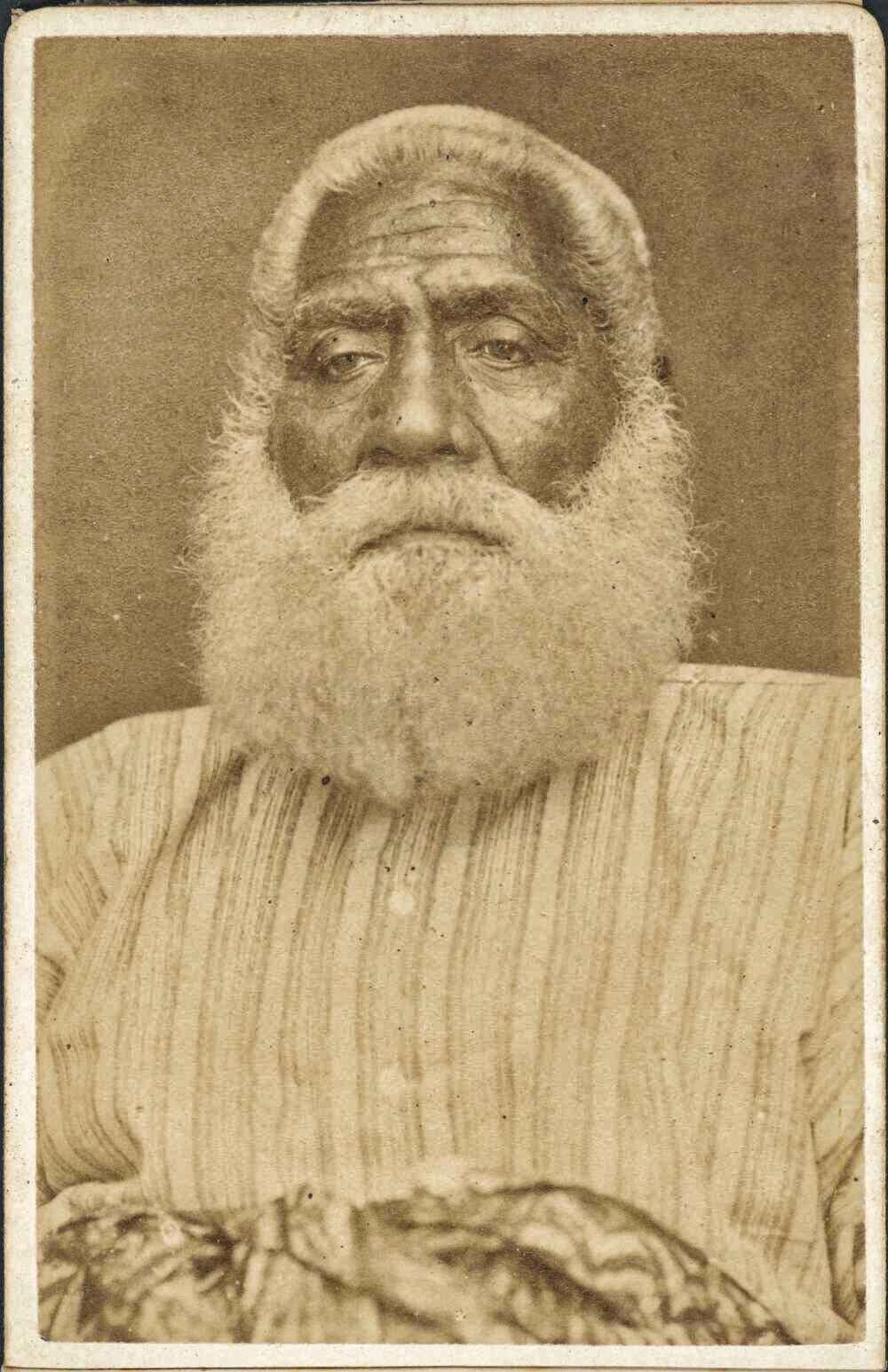
Ratu Seru Epenisa Cakobau, Self Proclaimed Tui Viti

The 1840s was a time of conflict where various Fiji clans attempted to assert dominance over each other. Eventually, a warlord named Seru Epenisa Cakobau of Bau Island was able to become a powerful influence in the region. His father was Ratu Tanoa Visawaqa, the Vunivalu (a chiefly title meaning warlord, often translated also as paramount chief) who had previously subdued much of western Fiji. Cakobau, following on from his father, became so dominant that he was able to expel the Europeans from Levuka for five years over a dispute about their giving of weapons to his local enemies. In the early 1850s, Cakobau went one step further and declared war on all Christians. His plans were thwarted after the missionaries in Fiji received support from the already converted Tongans and the presence of a British warship. The Tongan Prince Enele Maʻafu, a Christian, had established himself on the island of Lakeba in 1848, forcibly converting the local people to the Methodist Church. Cakobau and other chiefs in the west of Fiji regarded Maʻafu as a threat to their power and resisted his attempts to expand Tonga's dominion. Cakobau's influence, however, began to wane, and his heavy imposition of taxes on other Fijian chiefs, who saw him at best as first among equals, caused them to defect from him.

Around this time, the United States also became interested in asserting its power in the region, and it threatened intervention following a number of incidents involving their consul in the Fiji islands, John Brown Williams. In 1849, Williams had his trading store looted following an accidental fire, caused by stray cannon fire during a Fourth of July celebration, and in 1853, the European settlement of Levuka was burnt to the ground. Williams blamed Cakobau for both these incidents, and the U.S. representative wanted Cakobau's capital at Bau destroyed in retaliation. A naval blockade was instead set up around the island which put further pressure on Cakobau to give up on his warfare against the foreigners and their Christian allies. Finally, on 30 April 1854, Cakobau offered his soro (supplication) and yielded to these forces. He underwent the lotu and converted to Christianity. The traditional Fijian temples in Bau were destroyed, and the sacred nokonoko trees were cut down. Cakobau and his remaining men were then compelled to join with the Tongans, backed by the Americans and British, to subjugate the remaining chiefs in the region who still refused to convert. These chiefs were soon defeated with Qaraniqio of the Rewa being poisoned and Ratu Mara of Kaba being hanged in 1855. After these wars, most regions of Fiji, except for the interior highland areas, had been forced into giving up much of their traditional systems and were now vassals of Western interest. Cakobau was retained as a largely symbolic representative of a few Fijian peoples and was allowed to take the ironic and self proclaimed title of "Tui Viti" ("King of Fiji"), but the overarching control now lay with foreign powers.

=== Cotton, confederacies and the Kai Colo ===
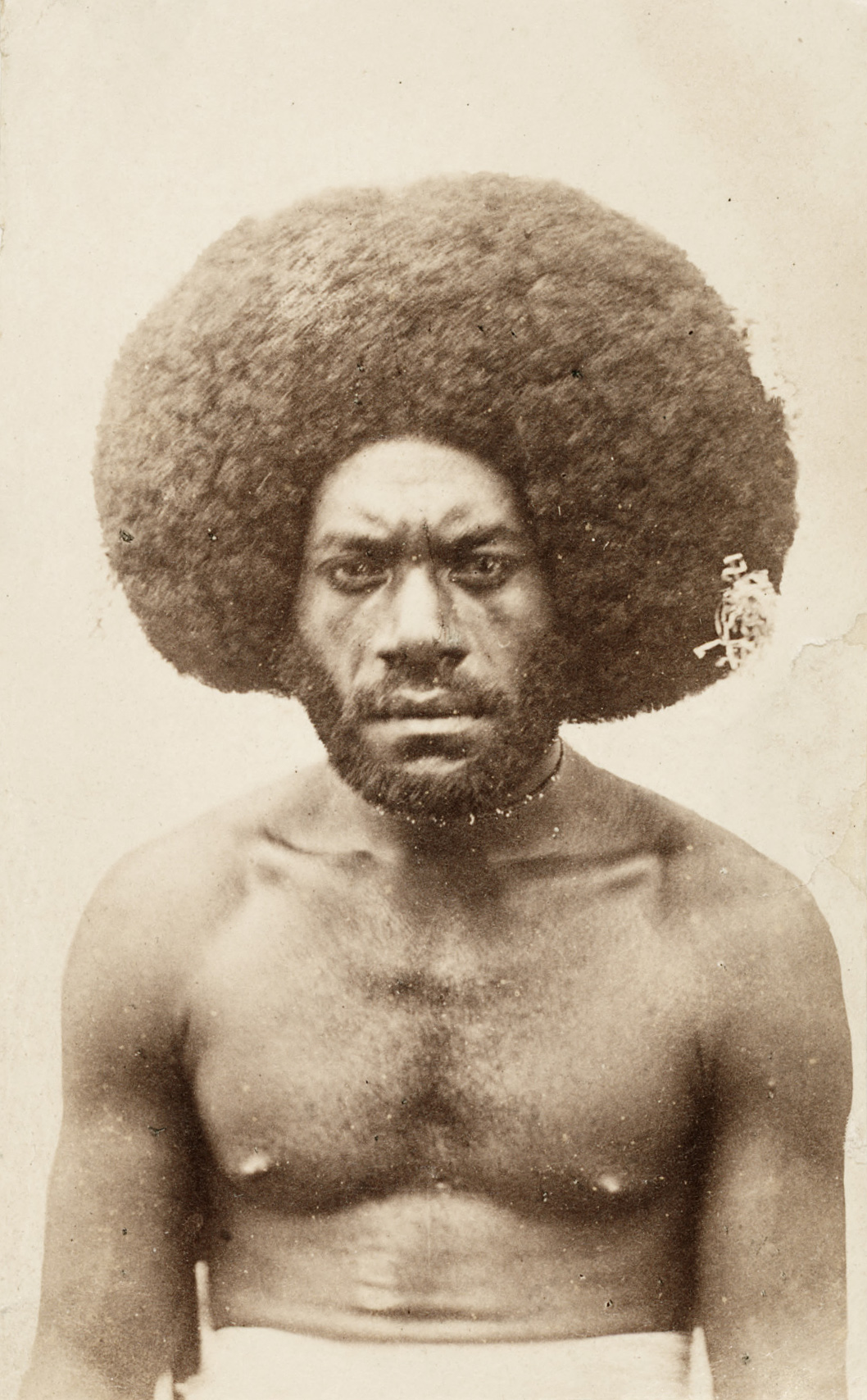
Kai Colo warrior

The rising price of cotton in the wake of the American Civil War (1861–1865) caused an influx of hundreds of settlers to Fiji in the 1860s from Australia and the United States in order to obtain land and grow cotton. Since there was still a lack of functioning government in Fiji, these planters were often able to get the land in violent or fraudulent ways, such as exchanging weapons or alcohol with Fijians who may or may not have been the true owners. Although this made for cheap land acquisition, competing land claims between the planters became problematic with no unified government to resolve the disputes. In 1865, the settlers proposed a confederacy of the seven main native kingdoms in Fiji to establish some sort of government. This was initially successful, and Cakobau was elected as the first president of the confederacy.

Flag of the Confederacy of Independent Kingdoms of Fiji, 1865–1867

With the demand for land high, the white planters started to push into the hilly interior of Viti Levu. This put them into direct confrontation with the Kai Colo, which was a general term to describe the various Fijian clans resident in these inland districts. The Kai Colo were still living a mostly traditional lifestyle, they were not Christianised, and they were not under the rule of Cakobau or the confederacy. In 1867, a travelling missionary named Thomas Baker was killed by Kai Colo in the mountains at the headwaters of the Sigatoka River. The acting British consul, John Bates Thurston, demanded that Cakobau lead a force of Fijians from coastal areas to suppress the Kai Colo. Cakobau eventually led a campaign into the mountains but suffered a humiliating loss with 61 of his fighters being killed. Settlers also came into conflict with the local eastern Kai Colo people called the Wainimala. Thurston called in the Australia Station section of the Royal Navy for assistance. The Navy duly sent Commander Rowley Lambert and HMS Challenger to conduct a punitive mission against the Wainimala. An armed force of 87 men shelled and burnt the village of Deoka, and a skirmish ensued which resulted in the deaths of over 40 Wainimala.

=== Kingdom of Fiji (1871–1874) ===
Flag of the Kingdom of Fiji, 1871–1874

After the collapse of the confederacy, Enele Maʻafu established a stable administration in the Lau Islands and the Tongans. Other foreign powers, such as the United States, were considering the possibility of annexing Fiji. This situation was not appealing to many settlers, almost all of whom were British subjects from Australia. Britain, however, refused to annex the country, and a compromise was needed.

In June 1871, George Austin Woods, an ex-lieutenant of the Royal Navy, managed to influence Cakobau and organise a group of like-minded settlers and chiefs into forming a governing administration. Cakobau was declared the monarch (Tui Viti) and the Kingdom of Fiji was established. Most Fijian chiefs agreed to participate, and even Ma'afu chose to recognise Cakobau and participate in the constitutional monarchy. However, many of the settlers had come from Australia, where negotiation with the indigenous people almost universally involved coercing them to accept very unfavourable terms. These settlers' expectation of dominating by force led them to form several aggressive, racially motivated groups, such as the British Subjects Mutual Protection Society. One group called themselves the Ku Klux Klan in homage to the white supremacist group in America. However, when respected individuals such as Charles St Julian, Robert Sherson Swanston and John Bates Thurston were appointed by Cakobau, a degree of authority was established.

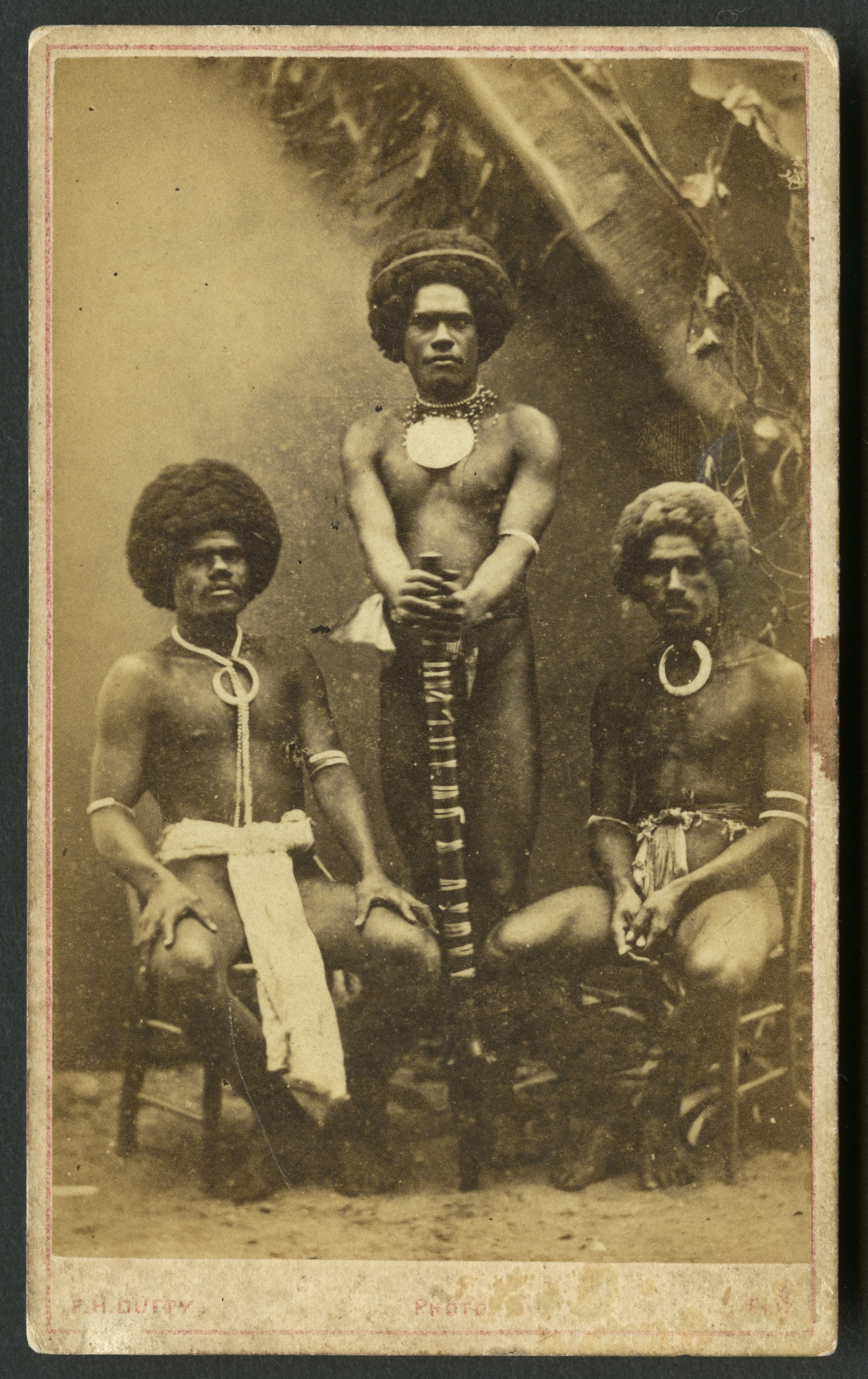
Three Kai Colo men in traditional Fijian attire

With the rapid increase in white settlers entering the country, the desire for land acquisition also intensified. Once again, conflict with the Kai Colo in the interior of Viti Levu ensued. In 1871, the killing of two settlers near the Ba River in the northwest of the island prompted a large punitive expedition of white farmers, imported slave labourers, and coastal Fijians to be organised. This group of around 400 armed vigilantes, including veterans of the U.S. Civil War, had a battle with the Kai Colo near the village of Cubu, in which both sides had to withdraw. The village was destroyed, and the Kai Colo, despite being armed with muskets, received numerous casualties. The Kai Colo responded by making frequent raids on the settlements of the whites and Christian Fijians throughout the district of Ba. Likewise, in the east of the island on the upper reaches of the Rewa River, villages were burnt, and many Kai Colo were shot by the vigilante settler squad called the Rewa Rifles.

Although the Cakobau government did not approve of the settlers taking justice into their own hands, it did want the Kai Colo subjugated and their land sold. The solution was to form an army. Robert S. Swanston, the minister for Native Affairs in the Kingdom, organised the training and arming of suitable Fijian volunteers and prisoners to become soldiers in what was variably called the King's Troops or the Native Regiment. In a similar system to the Native Police that was present in the colonies of Australia, two white settlers, James Harding and W. Fitzgerald, were appointed as the head officers of this paramilitary brigade. The formation of this force did not sit well with many of the white plantation owners, as they did not trust an army of Fijians to protect their interests.

The situation intensified further in early 1873 when the Burns family was killed by a Kai Colo raid in the Ba River area. The Cakobau government deployed 50 King's Troopers to the region under the command of Major Fitzgerald to restore order. The local whites refused their posting, and deployment of another 50 troops under Captain Harding was sent to emphasise the government's authority. To prove the worth of the Native Regiment, this augmented force went into the interior and massacred about 170 Kai Colo people at Na Korowaiwai. Upon returning to the coast, the force was met by the white settlers who still saw the government troops as a threat. A skirmish between the government's troops and the white settlers' brigade was only prevented by the intervention of Captain William Cox Chapman of HMS Dido, who detained the settlers' leaders, forcing the group to disband. The authority of the King's Troops and the Cakobau government to crush the Kai Colo was now total.

From March to October 1873, a force of about 200 King's Troops under the general administration of Swanston with around 1,000 coastal Fijian and white volunteer auxiliaries, led a campaign throughout the highlands of Viti Levu to annihilate the Kai Colo. Major Fitzgerald and Major H.C. Thurston (the brother of John Bates Thurston) led a two pronged attack throughout the region. The combined forces of the different clans of the Kai Colo made a stand at the village of Na Culi. The Kai Colo were defeated with dynamite and fire being used to flush them out from their defensive positions amongst the mountain caves. Many Kai Colo were killed, and one of the main leaders of the hill clans, Ratu Dradra, was forced to surrender with around 2,000 men, women and children being taken prisoner and sent to the coast. In the months after this defeat, the only main resistance was from the clans around the village of Nibutautau. Major Thurston crushed this resistance in the two months following the battle at Na Culi. Villages were burnt, Kai Colo were killed, and a further large number of prisoners were taken. About 1,000 of the prisoners (men, women and children) were sent to Levuka where some were hanged and the rest were sold into slavery and forced to work on various plantations throughout the islands.

=== Blackbirding and slavery in Fiji ===
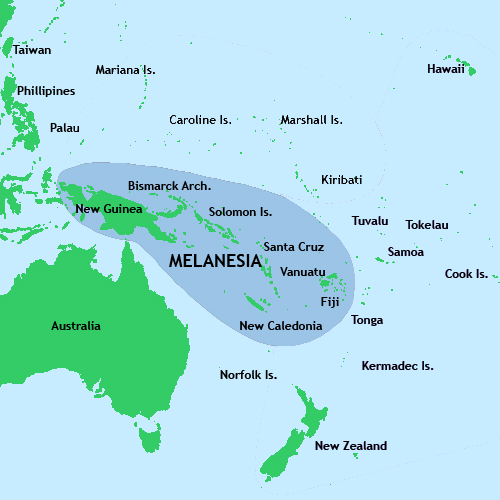
Map of Melanesia

The blackbirding era began in Fiji in 1865 when the first New Hebridean and Solomon Islands labourers were transported there to work on cotton plantations. The American Civil War had cut off the supply of US cotton to the international market when the Union blockaded Confederate ports. Cotton cultivation was potentially an extremely profitable business. Thousands of European planters flocked to Fiji to establish plantations, but found the natives unwilling to adapt to their plans. They sought labour from the Melanesian islands. On 5 July 1865 Ben Pease received the first licence to provide 40 labourers from the New Hebrides to Fiji.

The British and Queensland governments tried to regulate the recruitment and transport of labour. Melanesian labourers were to be recruited for a term of three years, paid three pounds per year, issued basic clothing, and given access to the company store for supplies. Most Melanesians were recruited by deceit, usually being enticed aboard ships with gifts, and then locked up. In 1875, the chief medical officer in Fiji, Sir William MacGregor, listed a mortality rate of 540 out of every 1,000 labourers. After the expiry of the three-year contract, the government required captains to transport the labourers back to their villages, but most ship captains dropped them off at the first island they sighted off the Fiji waters. The British sent warships to enforce the law (Pacific Islanders Protection Act 1872 (35 & 36 Vict. c. 19)), but only a small proportion of the culprits were prosecuted.

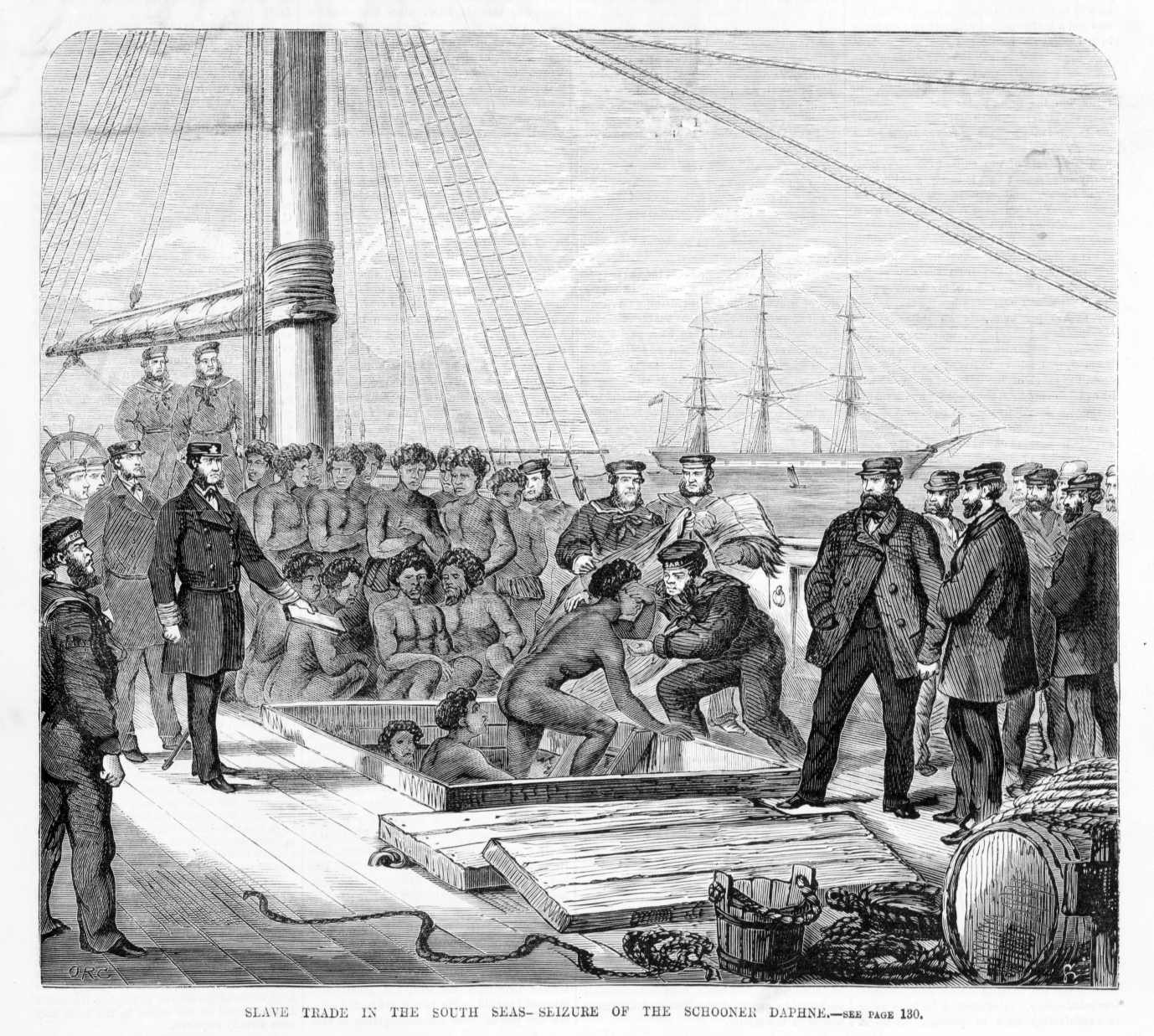
Seizure of the blackbirder Daphne

A notorious incident of the blackbirding trade was the 1871 voyage of the brig Carl, organised by Dr. James Patrick Murray to recruit labourers to work in the plantations of Fiji. Murray had his men reverse their collars and carry black books to appear as church missionaries. When islanders were enticed to a religious service, Murray and his men would produce guns and force the islanders onto boats. During the voyage, Murray shot about 60 islanders. He was never brought to trial for his actions, as he was given immunity in return for giving evidence against his crew members. The captain of the Carl, Joseph Armstrong, was later sentenced to death.

In addition to the blackbirded labour from other Pacific islands, thousands of people indigenous to the Fijian archipelago were sold into slavery on the plantations. As the white settler-backed Cakobau government, and later the British colonial government, subjugated areas in Fiji under its power, the resultant prisoners of war were regularly sold at auction to the planters. This provided a source of revenue for the government and also dispersed the rebels to different, often isolated islands where the plantations were located. The land that was occupied by these people before they became slaves was then also sold for additional revenue. An example of this is the Lovoni people of Ovalau, who, after being defeated in a war with the Cakobau government in 1871, were rounded up and sold to the settlers at £6 per head. Two thousand Lovoni men, women and children were sold, and their period of slavery lasted five years. Likewise, after the Kai Colo wars in 1873, thousands of people from the hill tribes of Viti Levu were sent to Levuka and sold into slavery. Warnings from the Royal Navy stationed in the area that buying these people was illegal were largely given without enforcement, and the British consul in Fiji, Edward Bernard Marsh, regularly turned a blind eye to this type of labour trade.

=== British annexation ===
Despite achieving military victories over the Kai Colo, the Cakobau government was faced with problems of legitimacy and economic viability. Indigenous Fijians and white settlers refused to pay taxes, and the cotton price had collapsed. With these major issues in mind, John Bates Thurston approached the British government, at Cakobau's request, with another offer to cede the islands. The newly elected Tory British government under Benjamin Disraeli encouraged expansion of the empire and was therefore much more sympathetic to annexing Fiji than it had been previously. The murder of Bishop John Patteson of the Melanesian Mission at Nukapu in the Reef Islands had provoked public outrage, which was compounded by the massacre by crew members of more than 150 Fijians on board the brig Carl. Two British commissioners were sent to Fiji to investigate the possibility of an annexation. The question was complicated by maneuverings for power between Cakobau and his old rival, Ma'afu, with both men vacillating for many months. On 21 March 1874, Cakobau made a final offer, which the British accepted. On 23 September, Sir Hercules Robinson, soon to be appointed the British Governor of Fiji, arrived on HMS Dido and received Cakobau with a royal 21-gun salute. After some vacillation, Cakobau agreed to renounce his Tui Viti title, retaining the title of Vunivalu, or Protector. The formal cession took place on 10 October 1874, when Cakobau, Ma'afu, and some of the senior chiefs of Fiji signed two copies of the Deed of Cession. Thus the Colony of Fiji was founded; 96 years of British rule followed.

==== Measles epidemic of 1875 ====
To celebrate the annexation of Fiji, Hercules Robinson, who was Governor of New South Wales at the time, took Cakobau and his two sons to Sydney. There was a measles outbreak in that city and the three Fijians all came down with the disease. On returning to Fiji, the colonial administrators decided not to quarantine the ship on which the convalescents travelled. This was despite the British having a very extensive knowledge of the devastating effects of infectious disease on an unexposed population. In 1875–76, the resulting epidemic of measles killed over 40,000 Fijians, about one-third of the Fijian population. Some Fijians allege that this failure of quarantine was a deliberate action to introduce the disease into the country. Historians have found no such evidence; the disease spread before the new British governor and colonial medical officers had arrived, and no quarantine rules existed under the outgoing regime.

==== Sir Arthur Gordon and the Little War ====
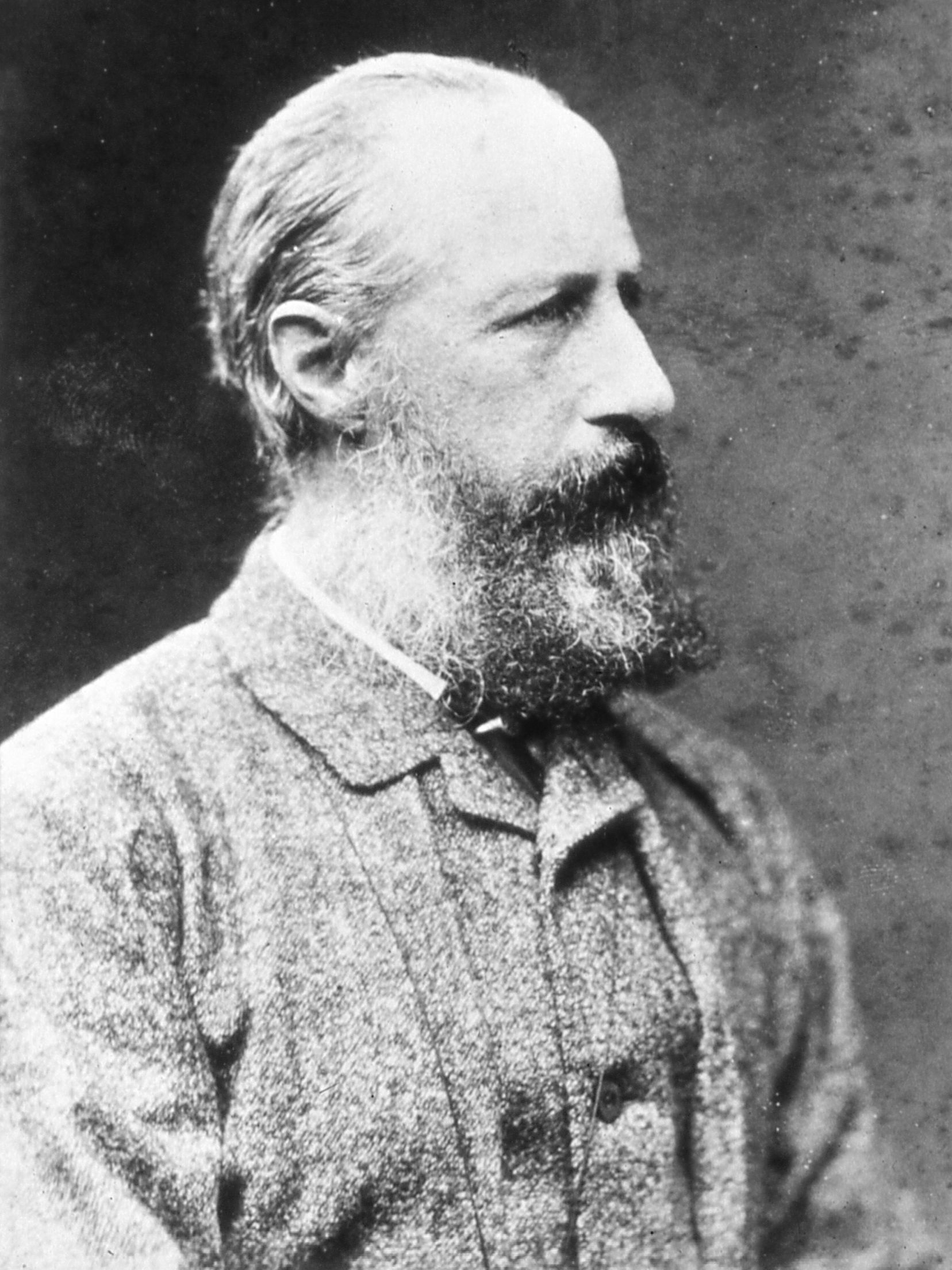
Governor Arthur Hamilton Gordon

Robinson was replaced as Governor of Fiji in June 1875 by Sir Arthur Hamilton Gordon. Gordon was immediately faced with an insurgency of the Qalimari and Kai Colo people. In early 1875, colonial administrator Edgar Leopold Layard had met with thousands of highland clans at Navuso to formalise their subjugation to British rule and Christianity. Layard and his delegation managed to spread the measles epidemic to the highlanders, causing mass deaths in this population. As a result, anger at the British colonists flared throughout the region, and a widespread uprising quickly took hold. Villages along the Sigatoka River and in the highlands above this area refused British control, and Gordon was tasked with quashing this rebellion.

In what Gordon termed the "Little War", the suppression of this uprising took the form of two coordinated military campaigns in the western half of Viti Levu. The first was conducted by Gordon's second cousin, Arthur John Lewis Gordon, against the Qalimari insurgents along the Sigatoka River. The second campaign was led by Louis Knollys against the Kai Colo in the mountains to the north of the river. Governor Gordon invoked a type of martial law in the area where Arthur John Lewis Gordon and Knollys had absolute power to conduct their missions outside of any restrictions of legislation. The two groups of rebels were kept isolated from each other by a force led by Walter Carew and George Le Hunte who were stationed at Nasaucoko. Carew also ensured the rebellion did not spread east by securing the loyalty of the Wainimala people of the eastern highlands. The war involved the use of the soldiers of the old Native Regiment of Cakobau supported by around 1,500 Christian Fijian volunteers from other areas of Viti Levu. The colonial New Zealand Government provided most of the advanced weapons for the army including 100 Snider rifles.

The campaign along the Sigatoka River was conducted under a scorched earth policy whereby numerous rebel villages were burnt and their fields ransacked. After the capture and destruction of the main fortified towns of Koroivatuma, Bukutia and Matanavatu, the Qalimari surrendered en masse. Those not killed in the fighting were taken prisoner and sent to the coastal town of Cuvu. This included 827 men, women and children as well as Mudu, the leader of the insurgents. The women and children were distributed to places like Nadi and Nadroga. Of the men, 15 were sentenced to death at a hastily conducted trial at Sigatoka. Governor Gordon was present, but chose to leave the judicial responsibility to his relative, Arthur John Lewis Gordon. Four were hanged and ten, including Mudu, were shot with one prisoner managing to escape. By the end of proceedings the governor noted that "my feet were literally stained with the blood that I had shed".

The northern campaign against the Kai Colo in the highlands was similar but involved removing the rebels from large, well-protected caves in the region. Knollys managed to clear the caves "after some considerable time and large expenditure of ammunition". The occupants of these caves included whole communities, and as a result, many men, women and children were either killed or wounded in these operations. The rest were taken prisoner and sent to the towns on the northern coast. The chief medical officer in British Fiji, William MacGregor, also took part both in killing Kai Colo and tending to their wounded. After the caves were taken, the Kai Colo surrendered and their leader, Bisiki, was captured. Various trials were held, mostly at Nasaucoko under Le Hunte, and 32 men were either hanged or shot, including Bisiki, who was killed trying to escape.

By the end of October 1876, the "Little War" was over, and Gordon had succeeded in vanquishing the rebels in the interior of Viti Levu. The remaining insurgents were sent into exile with hard labour for up to 10 years. Some non-combatants were allowed to return to rebuild their villages, but many areas in the highlands were ordered by Gordon to remain depopulated and in ruins. Gordon also constructed a military fortress, Fort Canarvon, at the headwaters of the Sigatoka River, where a large contingent of soldiers was based to maintain British control. He renamed the Native Regiment, the Armed Native Constabulary to lessen its appearance of being a military force.

To further consolidate social control throughout the colony, Governor Gordon introduced a system of appointed chiefs and village constables in the various districts to both enact his orders and report any disobedience from the populace. Gordon adopted the chiefly titles Roko and Buli to describe these deputies and established a Great Council of Chiefs which was directly subject to his authority as Supreme Chief. This body remained in existence until being suspended by the military-backed interim government in 2007 and only abolished in 2012. Gordon also extinguished the ability of Fijians to own, buy or sell land as individuals, the control being transferred to colonial authorities.

==== Indian indenture system in Fiji ====
Gordon decided in 1878 to import indentured labourers from India to work on the sugarcane fields that had taken the place of the cotton plantations. The 463 Indians arrived on 14 May 1879 – the first of some 61,000 that were to come before the scheme ended in 1916. The plan involved bringing the Indian workers to Fiji on a five-year contract, after which they could return to India at their own expense; if they chose to renew their contract for a second five-year term, they would be given the option of returning to India at the government's expense or remaining in Fiji. The great majority chose to stay. The Queensland Act, which regulated indentured labour in Queensland, was also made law in Fiji.

Between 1879 and 1916, tens of thousands of Indians moved to Fiji to work as indentured labourers, especially on sugarcane plantations. Given the steady influx of ships carrying indentured Indians to Fiji up until 1916, repatriated Indians generally boarded these same ships on their return voyage. The total number of repatriates under the Fiji indenture system is recorded as 39,261, while the number of arrivals is said to have been 60,553. Because the return figure includes children born in Fiji, many of the indentured Indians never returned to India.

==== Tuka rebellions ====
With almost all aspects of indigenous Fijian social life being controlled by the British colonial authorities, a number of charismatic individuals preaching dissent and return to pre-colonial culture were able to forge a following amongst the disenfranchised. These movements were called Tuka, which roughly translates as "those who stand up". The first Tuka movement was led by Ndoongumoy, better known as Navosavakandua, which means "he who speaks only once". He told his followers that if they returned to traditional ways and worshipped traditional deities such as Degei and Rokola, their current condition would be transformed, with the whites and their puppet Fijian chiefs being subservient to them. Navosavakandua was previously exiled from the Viti Levu highlands in 1878 for disturbing the peace, and the British quickly arrested him and his followers after this open display of rebellion. He was again exiled, this time to Rotuma where he died soon after his 10-year sentence ended.

Other Tuka organisations, however, soon appeared. The British colonial administration ruthlessly suppressed both the leaders and followers, with figureheads such as Sailose being banished to an asylum for 12 years. In 1891, entire populations of villages who were sympathetic to the Tuka ideology were deported as punishment. Three years later in the highlands of Vanua Levu, where locals had re-engaged in traditional religion, Governor Thurston ordered in the Armed Native Constabulary to destroy the towns and the religious relics. Leaders were jailed and villagers exiled or forced to amalgamate into government-run communities. Later, in 1914, Apolosi Nawai came to the forefront of Fijian Tuka resistance by founding Viti Kabani, a co-operative company that would legally monopolise the agricultural sector and boycott European planters. The British and their proxy Council of Chiefs were not able to prevent the Viti Kabani's rise, and again the colonists were forced to send in the Armed Native Constabulary. Apolosi and his followers were arrested in 1915, and the company collapsed in 1917. Over the next 30 years, Apolosi was re-arrested, jailed and exiled, with the British viewing him as a threat right up to his death in 1946.

=== World War I and II ===
Fiji was only peripherally involved in World War I. One memorable incident occurred in September 1917 when Count Felix von Luckner arrived at Wakaya Island, off the eastern coast of Viti Levu, after his raider, SMS Seeadler, had run aground in the Cook Islands following the shelling of Papeete in the French colony of Tahiti. On 21 September, the district police inspector took a number of Fijians to Wakaya, and von Luckner, not realising that they were unarmed, unwittingly surrendered.

Citing unwillingness to exploit the Fijian people, the colonial authorities did not permit Fijians to enlist. One Fijian of chiefly rank, a great-grandson of Cakobau, joined the French Foreign Legion and received France's highest military decoration, the Croix de Guerre. After going on to complete a law degree at Oxford University, this same chief returned to Fiji in 1921 as both a war hero and the country's first-ever university graduate. In the years that followed, Ratu Sir Lala Sukuna, as he was later known, established himself as the most powerful chief in Fiji and forged embryonic institutions for what would later become the modern Fijian nation.

Flag of Fiji 1924–1970

By the time of World War II, the United Kingdom had reversed its policy of not enlisting natives, and many thousands of Fijians volunteered for the Fiji Infantry Regiment, which was under the command of Ratu Sir Edward Cakobau, another great-grandson of Cakobau. The regiment was attached to New Zealand and Australian army units during the war. Because of its central location, Fiji was selected as a training base for the Allies. An airstrip was built at Nadi (later to become an international airport), and gun emplacements studded the coast. Fijians gained a reputation for bravery in the Solomon Islands campaign, with one war correspondent describing their ambush tactics as "death with velvet gloves". Corporal Sefanaia Sukanaivalu, of Yucata, was posthumously awarded the Victoria Cross, as a result of his bravery in the Battle of Bougainville.

=== Responsible government and independence ===
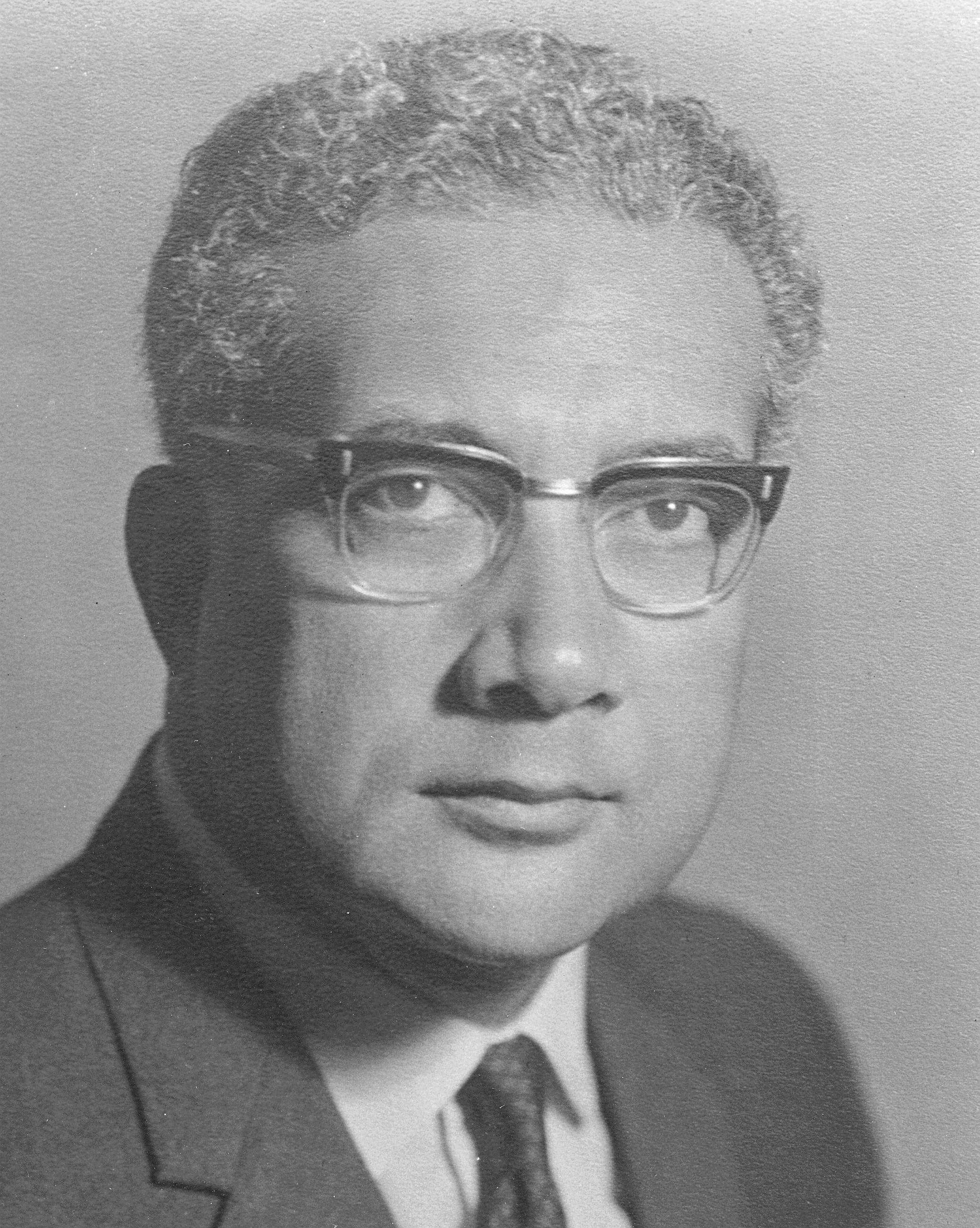
Kamisese Mara

A constitutional conference was held in London in July 1965 to discuss constitutional changes with a view to introducing responsible government. Indo-Fijians, led by A. D. Patel, demanded the immediate introduction of full self-government, with a fully elected legislature, to be elected by universal suffrage on a common voters' roll. These demands were vigorously rejected by the ethnic Fijian delegation, who still feared loss of control over natively owned land and resources should an Indo-Fijian dominated government come to power. The British made it clear, however, that they were determined to bring Fiji to self-government and eventual independence. Acknowledging their lack of choice, Fiji's chiefs decided to negotiate for the best deal they could get.

A series of compromises led to the establishment of a cabinet system of government in 1967, with Ratu Kamisese Mara as the first Chief Minister. Ongoing negotiations between Mara and Sidiq Koya, who had taken over the leadership of the mainly Indo-Fijian National Federation Party on Patel's death in 1969, led to a second constitutional conference in London, in April 1970, at which Fiji's Legislative Council agreed on a compromise electoral formula and a timetable for independence as a fully sovereign and independent nation within the Commonwealth. The Legislative Council would be replaced with a bicameral Parliament, with a Senate dominated by Fijian chiefs and a popularly elected House of Representatives. In the 52-member House, Native Fijians and Indo-Fijians would each be allocated 22 seats, of which 12 would represent communal constituencies comprising voters registered on strictly ethnic roles, and another 10 representing national constituencies to which members were allocated by ethnicity but elected by universal suffrage. A further 8 seats were reserved for "general electors" – Europeans, Chinese, Banaban Islanders, and other minorities; 3 of these were "communal" and 5 "national". With this compromise, it was agreed that Fiji would become independent.

The British flag, the Union Jack, was lowered for the last time at sunset on 9 October 1970 in the capital Suva. The Fijian flag was raised after dawn on the morning of 10 October 1970; the country had officially become independent at midnight.

=== Independence ===
==== 1987 coups d'état ====
The British granted Fiji independence in 1970. Democratic rule was interrupted by two military coups in 1987 precipitated by a growing perception that the government was dominated by the Indo-Fijian (Indian) community. The second 1987 coup saw both the Fijian monarchy and the Governor General replaced by a non-executive president and the name of the country changed from Dominion of Fiji to Republic of Fiji and then in 1997 to Republic of the Fiji Islands. The two coups and the accompanying civil unrest contributed to heavy Indo-Fijian emigration; the resulting population loss resulted in economic difficulties and ensured that Melanesians became the majority.

In 1990, the new constitution institutionalised ethnic Fijian domination of the political system. The Group Against Racial Discrimination (GARD) was formed to oppose the unilaterally imposed constitution and to restore the 1970 constitution. In 1992, Sitiveni Rabuka, the Lieutenant Colonel who had carried out the 1987 coup, became Prime Minister following elections held under the new constitution. Three years later, Rabuka established the Constitutional Review Commission, which in 1997 wrote a new constitution, which was supported by most leaders of the indigenous Fijian and Indo-Fijian communities. Fiji was re-admitted to the Commonwealth of Nations.

==== 2000 coup d'état ====
In 2000, a coup was instigated by George Speight, which effectively toppled the government of Mahendra Chaudhry, who in 1997 had become the country's first Indo-Fijian Prime Minister following the adoption of the new constitution. Commodore Frank Bainimarama assumed executive power after the resignation, possibly forced, of President Ratu Sir Kamisese Mara. Later in 2000, Fiji was rocked by two mutinies when rebel soldiers went on a rampage at Suva's Queen Elizabeth Barracks. The High Court ordered the reinstatement of the constitution, and in September 2001, to restore democracy, a general election was held which was won by interim Prime Minister Laisenia Qarase's Soqosoqo Duavata ni Lewenivanua party.

In 2005, the Qarase government amid much controversy proposed a Reconciliation and Unity Commission with power to recommend compensation for victims of the 2000 coup and amnesty for its perpetrators. However, the military, especially the nation's top military commander, Frank Bainimarama, strongly opposed this bill. Bainimarama agreed with detractors who said that to grant amnesty to supporters of the present government who had played a role in the violent coup was a sham. His attack on the legislation, which continued unremittingly throughout May and into June and July, further strained his already tense relationship with the government.

==== 2006 coup d'état ====
In late November and early December 2006, Bainimarama was instrumental in the 2006 Fijian coup d'état. Bainimarama handed down a list of demands to Qarase after a bill was put forward to parliament, part of which would have offered pardons to participants in the 2000 coup attempt. He gave Qarase an ultimatum date of 4 December to accede to these demands or to resign from his post. Qarase adamantly refused either to concede or resign, and on 5 December President Ratu Josefa Iloilo signed a legal order dissolving the parliament after meeting with Bainimarama.

Citing corruption in the government, Bainimarama staged a military takeover on 5 December 2006 against the prime minister that he had installed after a 2000 coup. The commodore took over the powers of the presidency and dissolved the parliament, paving the way for the military to continue the takeover. The coup was the culmination of weeks of speculation following conflict between the elected prime minister, Laisenia Qarase, and Bainimarama. Bainimarama had repeatedly issued demands and deadlines to the prime minister. A particular issue was previously pending legislation to pardon those involved in the 2000 coup. Bainimarama named Jona Senilagakali as caretaker prime minister. The next week Bainimarama said he would ask the Great Council of Chiefs to restore executive powers to the president, Ratu Josefa Iloilo.

On 4 January 2007, the military announced that it was restoring executive power to Iloilo, who made a broadcast endorsing the actions of the military. The next day, Iloilo named Bainimarama as the interim prime minister, indicating that the military was still effectively in control. In the wake of the takeover, reports emerged of alleged intimidation of some of those critical of the interim regime.

==== 2009 transfer of power ====
In April 2009, the Fiji Court of Appeal overturned the High Court decision that Bainimarama's takeover of Qarase's government was lawful and declared the interim government to be illegal. Bainimarama agreed to step down as interim prime minister immediately, along with his government, and President Iloilo was to appoint a new prime minister. President Iloilo abrogated the constitution, and removed all office holders under the constitution including all judges and the governor of the Central Bank. In his own words, he "appoint[ed] [him]self as the Head of the State of Fiji under a new legal order". He then reappointed Bainimarama under his "New Order" as interim prime minister and imposed a "Public Emergency Regulation" limiting internal travel and allowing press censorship.

On 2 May 2009, Fiji became the first nation ever to have been suspended from participation in the Pacific Islands Forum, for its failure to hold democratic elections by the date promised. Nevertheless, it remains a member of the Forum.

On 1 September 2009, Fiji was suspended from the Commonwealth of Nations. The action was taken because Bainimarama failed to hold elections by 2010 as the Commonwealth of Nations had demanded after the 2006 coup. Bainimarama stated a need for more time to end a voting system that heavily favoured ethnic Fijians at the expense of the multi-ethnic minorities. Critics claimed that he had suspended the constitution and was responsible for human rights violations by arresting and detaining opponents.

In his 2010 New Year's address, Bainimarama announced the lifting of the Public Emergency Regulations (PER). However, the PER was not rescinded until January 2012, and the Suva Philosophy Club was the first organisation to reorganise and convene public meetings. The PER had been put in place in April 2009 when the former constitution was abrogated. The PER had allowed restrictions on speech, public gatherings, and censorship of news media and had given security forces added powers. He also announced a nationwide consultation process leading to a new constitution under which the 2014 elections were held.

The official name of the country was reverted to Republic of Fiji in February 2011.

==== Since 2014 ====
On 14 March 2014, the Commonwealth Ministerial Action Group voted to change Fiji's full suspension from the Commonwealth of Nations to a suspension from the councils of the Commonwealth, allowing them to participate in a number of Commonwealth activities, including the 2014 Commonwealth Games. The suspension was lifted in September 2014.

The FijiFirst party, led by Prime Minister Frank Bainimarama, won outright majority in the country's 51-seat parliament both in 2014 election and narrowly in 2018 election. In October 2021, Tui Macuata Ratu Wiliame Katonivere was elected the new President of Fiji by the parliament.

On 24 December 2022, Sitiveni Rabuka, the head of the People's Alliance (PAP), became Fiji's 12th prime minister, succeeding Bainimarama, following the December 2022 general election.

== Geography ==
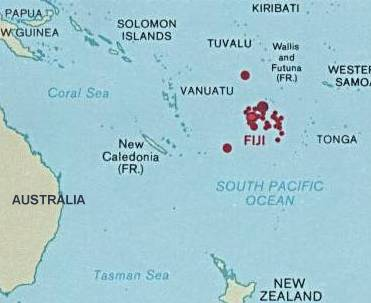
Fiji's location in Oceania

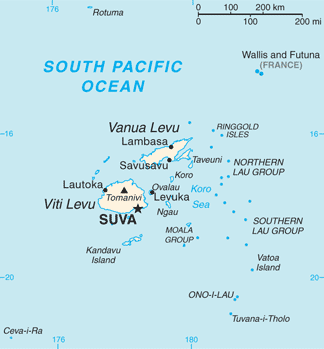
A map of Fiji

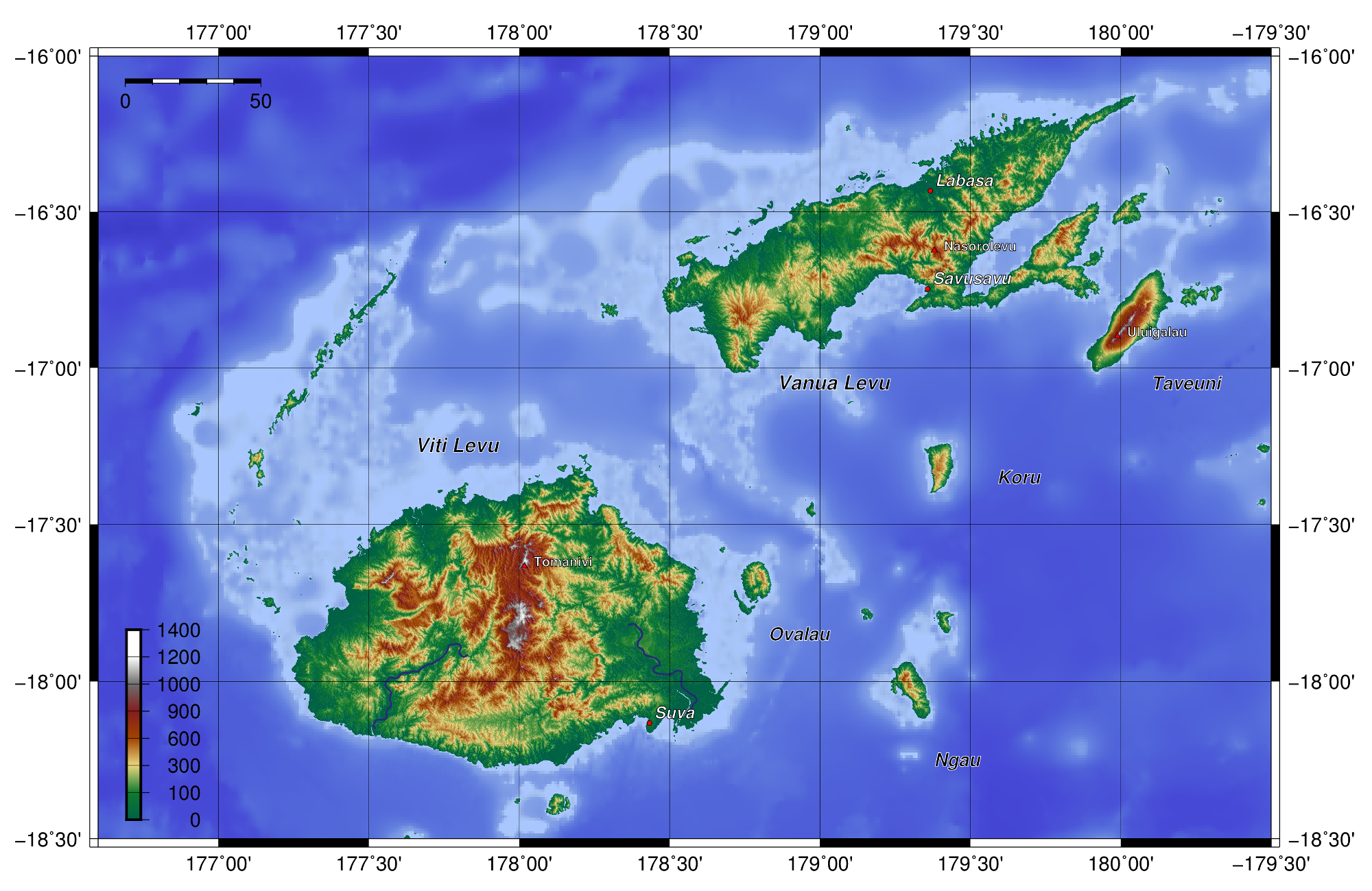
Topography of Fiji

Fiji lies approximately 5,100 km (3,200 mi) southwest of Hawaii and roughly 3,150 km (1,960 mi) from Sydney, Australia. Fiji is the hub of the Southwest Pacific, midway between Vanuatu and Tonga. The archipelago is located between 176° 53′ east and 178° 12′ west. The archipelago is roughly 498,000 square miles (1,290,000 km^{2}) and less than 2 percent is dry land. The 180° meridian runs through Taveuni, but the International Date Line is bent to give uniform time (UTC+12) to all of the Fiji group. With the exception of Rotuma, the Fiji group lies between 15° 42′ and 20° 02′ south. Rotuma is located 220 nautical miles (410 km; 250 mi) north of the group, 360 nautical miles (670 km; 410 mi) from Suva, 12° 30′ south of the equator.

Fiji covers a total area of some 194,000 square kilometres (75,000 sq mi) of which around 10% is land. Fiji consists of 332 islands (of which 106 are inhabited) and 522 smaller islets. The two most important islands are Viti Levu and Vanua Levu, which account for about three-quarters of the total land area of the country. The islands are mountainous, with peaks up to 1,324 metres (4,341 ft), and covered with thick tropical forests.

The highest point is Mount Tomanivi on Viti Levu. Viti Levu hosts the capital city of Suva and is home to nearly three-quarters of the population. Other important towns include Nadi (the location of the international airport), and Lautoka, Fiji's second largest city, with large sugar cane mills and a seaport.

The main towns on Vanua Levu are Labasa and Savusavu. Other islands and island groups include Taveuni and Kadavu (the third and fourth largest islands, respectively), the Mamanuca Group (just off Nadi) and Yasawa Group, which are popular tourist destinations, the Lomaiviti Group, off Suva, and the remote Lau Group. Rotuma has special administrative status in Fiji. Ceva-i-Ra, an uninhabited reef, is located about 250 nautical miles (460 km; 290 mi) southwest of the main archipelago.

Fiji contains two ecoregions: Fiji tropical moist forests and Fiji tropical dry forests. It had a 2018 Forest Landscape Integrity Index mean score of 8.35/10, ranking it 24th globally out of 172 countries.

International non-governmental organisations contribute with local partners on conservation work in Fiji. Conservation International Fiji has supported protected-area initiatives, including work contributing to the establishment of the Sovi Basin Conservation Area on Viti Levu, and has carried out mangrove-focused blue carbon work in priority sites such as Navitilevu Bay in Ra Province.

=== Climate ===
The climate in Fiji is tropical marine and warm year-round with minimal extremes. The warm season is from November to April, and the cooler season lasts from May to October. Temperatures in the cool season average 22 °C (72 °F). Rainfall is variable, with the warm season experiencing heavier rainfall, especially inland. For the larger islands, rainfall is heavier on the southeast portions of the islands than on the northwest portions, with consequences for agriculture in those areas. Winds are moderate, though cyclones occur about once annually (10–12 times per decade).

Climate change in Fiji is an exceptionally pressing issue for the country – as an island nation, Fiji is particularly vulnerable to rising sea levels, coastal erosion and extreme weather. These changes, along with temperature rise, will displace Fijian communities and will prove disruptive to the national economy – tourism, agriculture and fisheries, the largest contributors to the nation's GDP, will be severely impacted by climate change causing increases in poverty and food insecurity. As a party to both the Kyoto Protocol and the Paris Climate Agreement, Fiji hopes to achieve net-zero emissions by 2050 which, along with national policies, will help to mitigate the impacts of climate change. The governments of Fiji and other island states at risk from climate change (Niue, the Solomon Islands, Tuvalu, Tonga and Vanuatu) launched the "Port Vila Call for a Just Transition to a Fossil Fuel Free Pacific", calling for the phase out fossil fuels and the 'rapid and just transition' to renewable energy and strengthening environmental law including introducing the crime of ecocide.

== Government and politics ==
Politics in Fiji normally take place in the framework of a parliamentary representative democratic republic wherein the Prime Minister of Fiji is the head of government and the President the Head of State, and of a multi-party system. Executive power is exercised by the government, legislative power is vested in both the government and the Parliament of Fiji, and the judiciary is independent of the executive and the legislature.

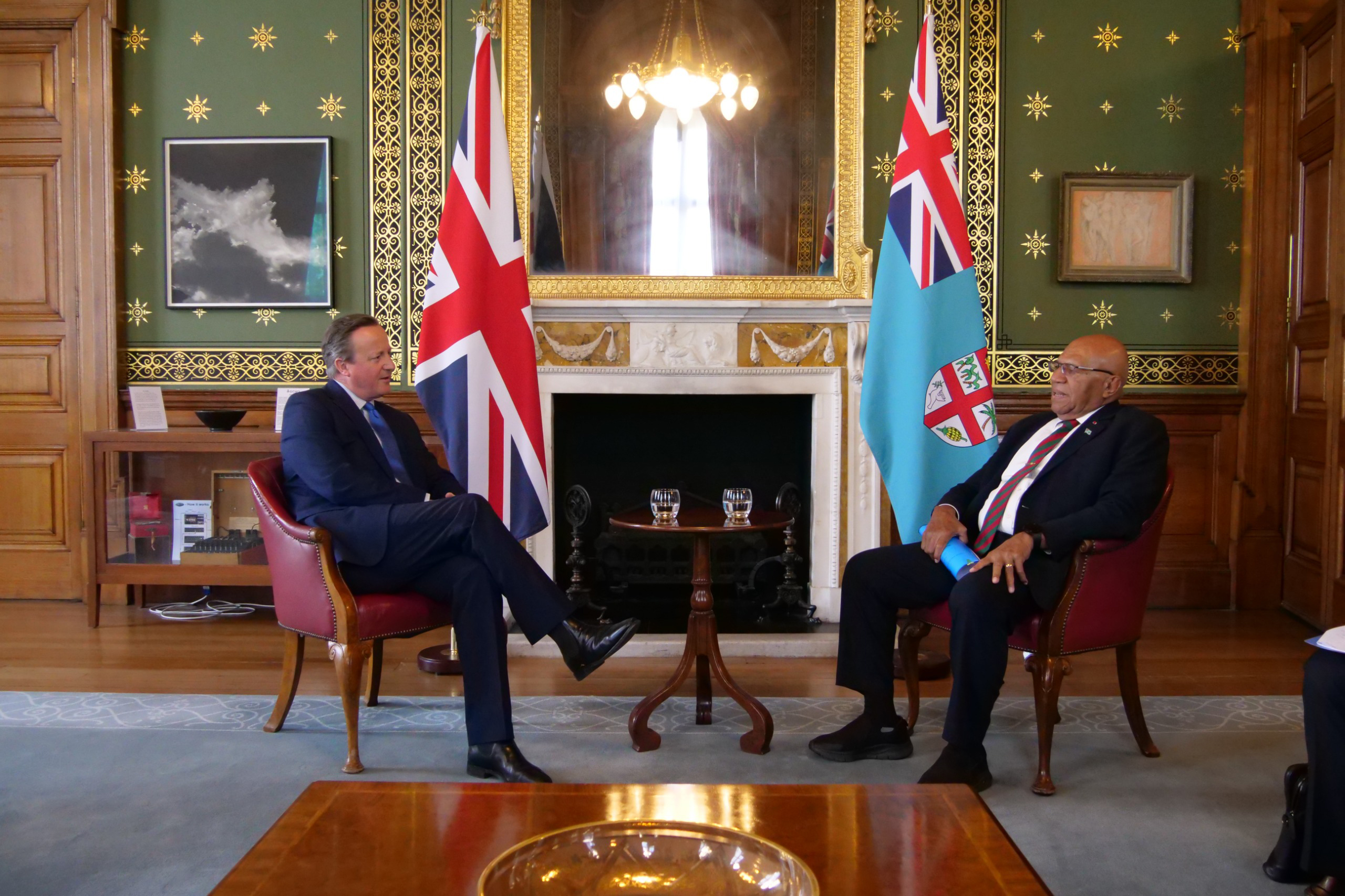
Fijian Prime Minister Sitiveni Rabuka with British Foreign Secretary David Cameron, 10 May 2024

A general election took place on 17 September 2014. Bainimarama's FijiFirst party won with 59.2% of the vote, and the election was deemed credible by a group of international observers from Australia, India and Indonesia.

In the 2018 election, FijiFirst won with 50.02 per cent of the total votes cast. It held its outright majority in the parliament, winning 27 of the 51 seats. The Social Democratic Liberal Party (SODELPA) came in second with 39.85 per cent of the vote.

In the 2022 election FijiFirst lost its parliamentary majority. Sitiveni Rabuka of People's Alliance party, with the backing of the Social Liberal Democratic party (Sodelpa), became Fiji's new Prime Minister to succeed Frank Bainimarama.

=== Armed forces and law enforcement ===
The military consists of the Republic of Fiji Military Forces with a total manpower of 3,500 active soldiers and 6,000 reservists, and includes a Navy unit of 300 personnel. The land force comprises the Fiji Infantry Regiment (regular and territorial force organised into six light infantry battalions), Fiji Engineer Regiment, Logistic Support Unit and Force Training Group. Relative to its size, Fiji has fairly large armed forces and has been a major contributor to UN peacekeeping missions in various parts of the world. In addition, a significant number of former military personnel have served in the lucrative security sector in Iraq following the 2003 U.S.-led invasion.

The law enforcement branch is composed of the Fiji Police Force and Fiji Corrections Service.

=== Administrative divisions ===
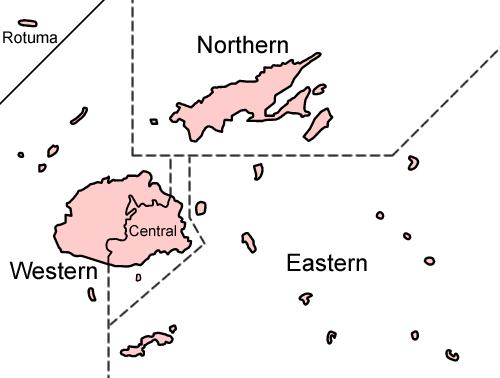
A map of Fiji's administrative divisions

Fiji is divided into four major divisions which are further divided into 14 provinces. The divisions and their provinces are as follows:

- Central Division has 5 provinces: Naitasiri, Namosi, Rewa, Serua, and Tailevu.
- Eastern Division has 3 provinces: Kadavu, Lau, and Lomaiviti.
- Northern Division has 3 provinces: Bua, Cakaudrove, and Macuata.
- Western Division has 3 provinces: Ba, Nadroga-Navosa, and Ra.

Fiji was divided into three confederacies or governments during the reign of Seru Epenisa Cakobau. Though these are not considered political divisions, they are still considered important in the social divisions of the indigenous Fijians:

| Confederacy | Chief |
|---|---|
| Kubuna | Vacant |
| Burebasaga | Ro Teimumu Vuikaba Kepa |
| Tovata | Ratu Naiqama Tawake Lalabalavu |

== Economy ==
Endowed with forest, mineral, and fish resources, Fiji is one of the most developed of the Pacific island economies, though still with a large subsistence sector. Some progress was experienced by this sector when Marion M. Ganey introduced credit unions to the islands in the 1950s. Natural resources include timber, fish, gold, copper, offshore oil, and hydropower. Fiji experienced a period of rapid growth in the 1960s and 1970s but stagnated in the 1980s. The coups of 1987 caused further contraction.

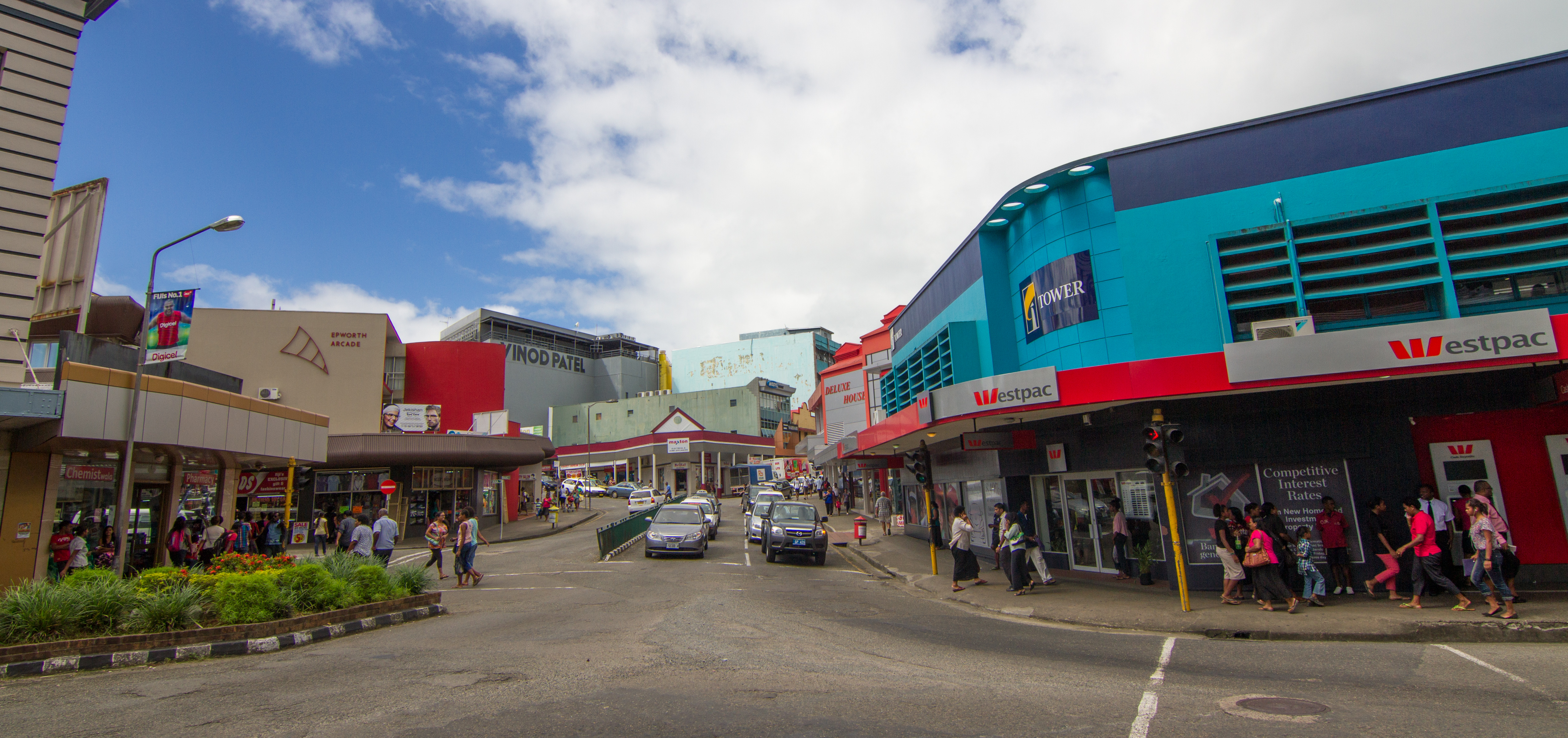
Suva, capital and commercial centre of Fiji

Economic liberalisation in the years following the coups created a boom in the garment industry and a steady growth rate despite growing uncertainty regarding land tenure in the sugar industry. The expiration of leases for sugar cane farmers (along with reduced farm and factory efficiency) has led to a decline in sugar production despite subsidies for sugar provided by the EU. Fiji's gold mining industry is based in Vatukoula.

Urbanisation and expansion in the service sector have contributed to recent GDP growth. Sugar exports and a rapidly growing tourist industry – with tourists numbering 430,800 in 2003 and increasing in the subsequent years – are the major sources of foreign exchange. Fiji is highly dependent on tourism for revenue. Sugar processing makes up one-third of industrial activity. Long-term problems include low investment and uncertain property rights.

The South Pacific Stock Exchange (SPSE) is the only licensed securities exchange in Fiji and is based in Suva. Its vision is to become a regional exchange.

=== Tourism ===
Yearly tourist arrivals in thousands

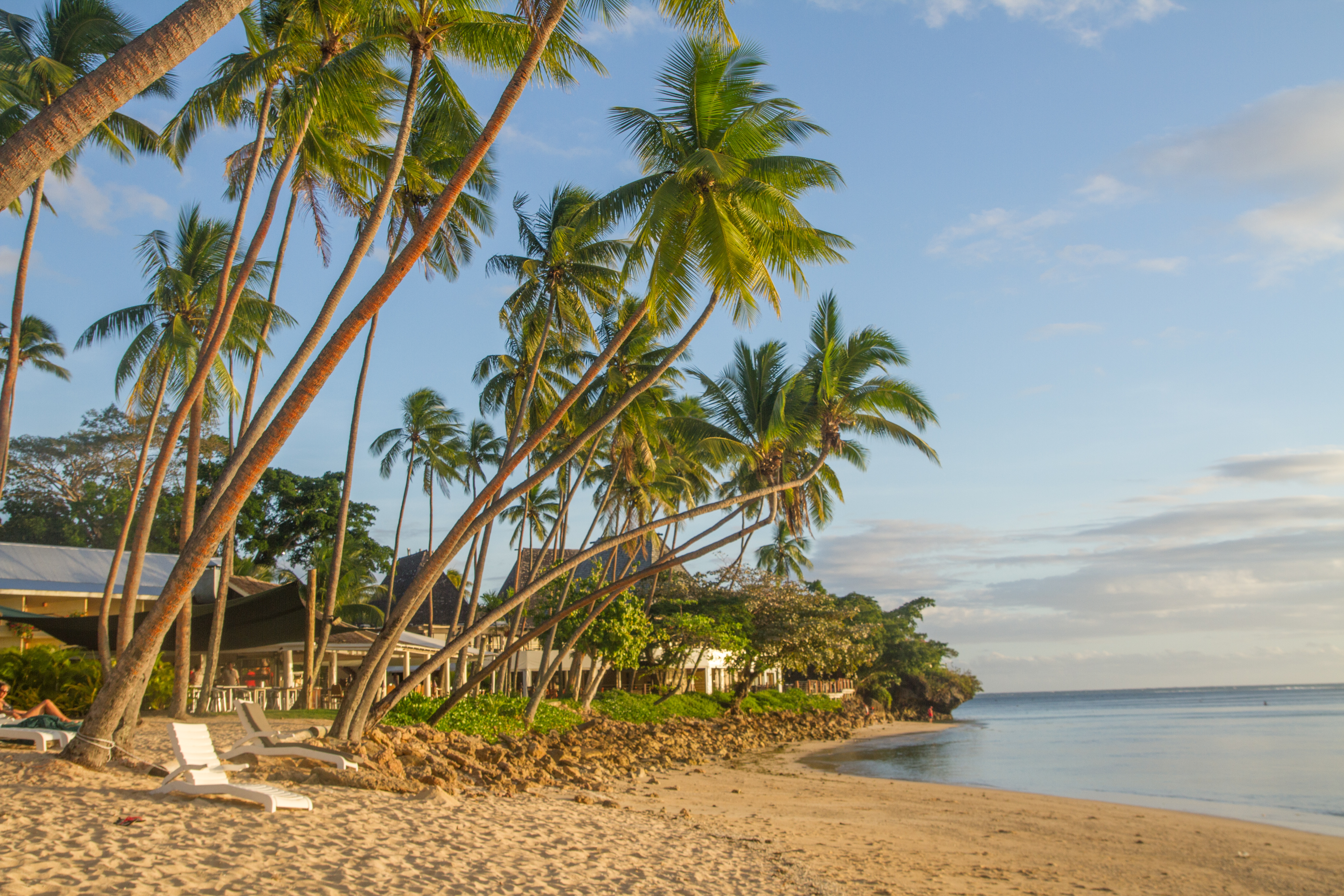
Fijian luxury resort

Fiji has a significant amount of tourism with the popular regions being Nadi, the Coral Coast, Denarau Island, and Mamanuca Islands. The biggest sources of international visitors by country are Australia, New Zealand and the United States. Fiji has a significant number of soft coral reefs, and scuba diving is a common tourist activity. Fiji's main attractions to tourists are primarily white sandy beaches and aesthetically pleasing islands with all-year tropical weather. In general, Fiji is a mid-range priced holiday/vacation destination with most of the accommodations in this range. It also has a variety of world-class five-star resorts and hotels. More budget resorts are being opened in remote areas, which will provide more tourism opportunities. CNN named Fiji's Laucala Island Resort as one of the fifteen world's most beautiful island hotels.

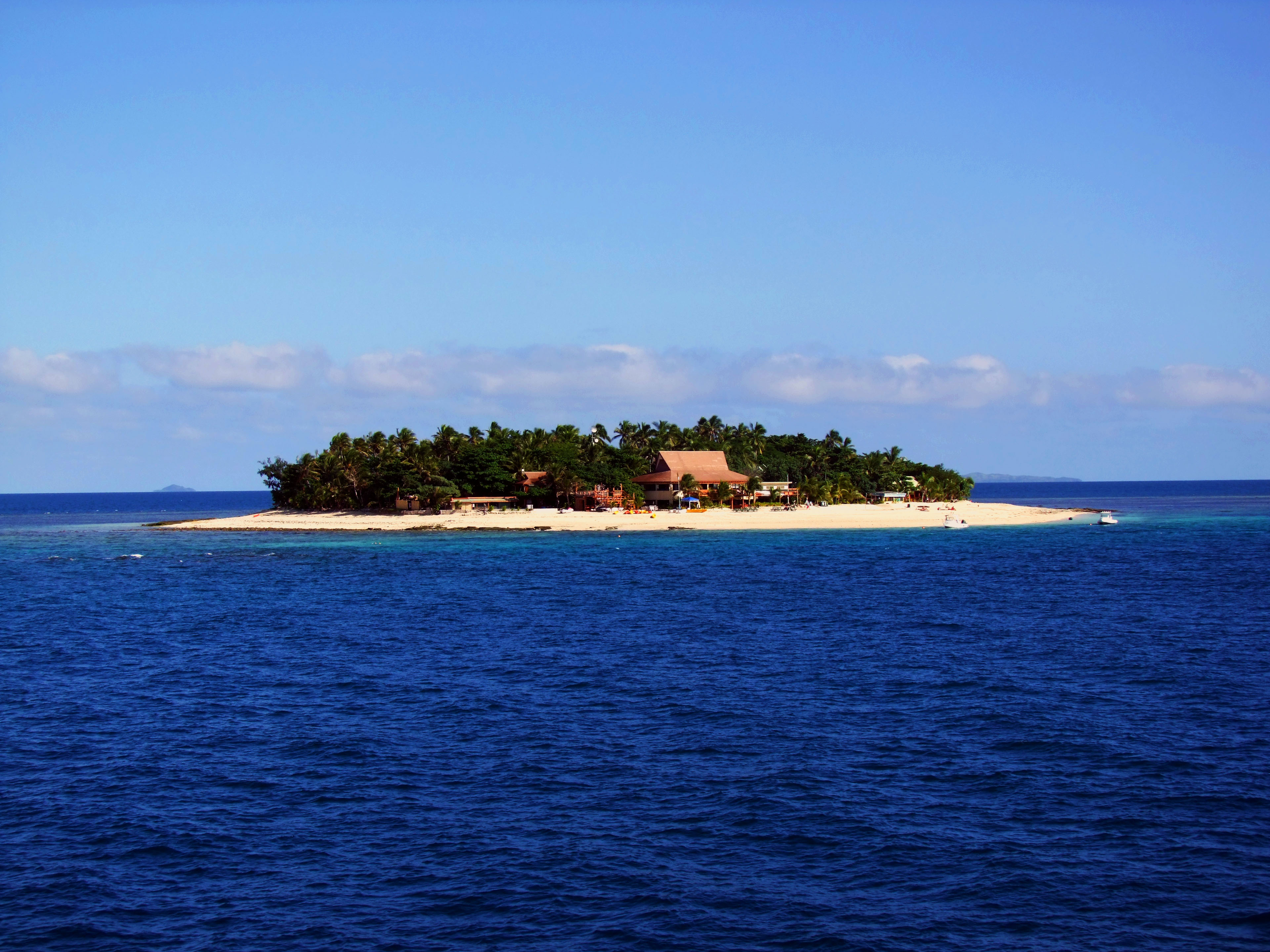
An island in the Mamanuca Islands group

Official statistics show that in 2012, 75% of visitors stated that they came for a holiday/vacation. Honeymoons are very popular, as are romantic getaways in general. There are also family-friendly resorts with facilities for young children including kids' clubs and nanny options. Fiji has several popular tourism destinations. The Botanical Gardens of Thursten in Suva, Sigatoka Sand Dunes, and Colo-I-Suva Forest Park are three options on the mainland (Viti Levu). A major attraction on the outer islands is scuba diving.

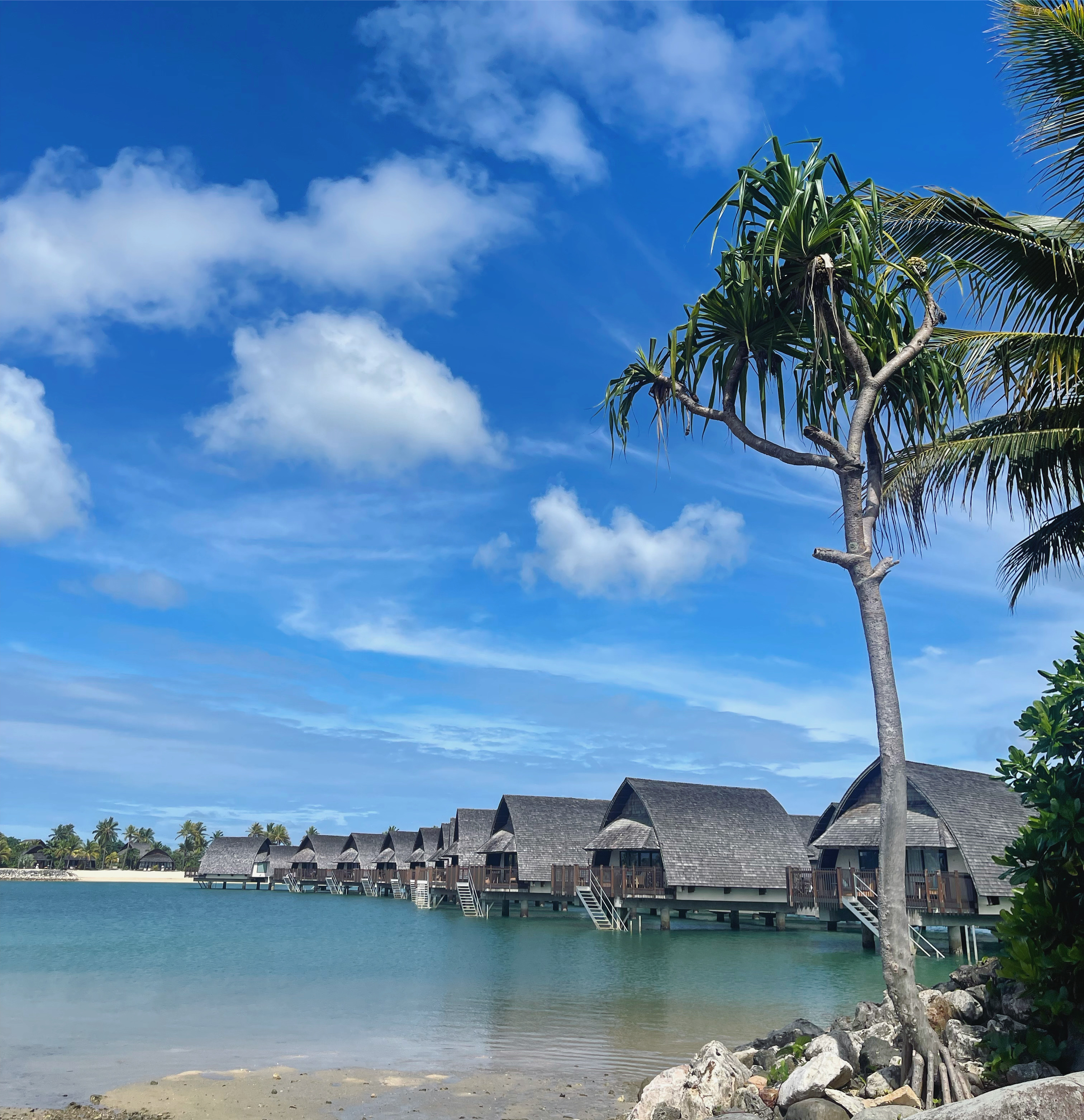
View of the over water bures located at Marriott Momi Bay, Western Fiji

According to the Fiji Bureau of Statistics, most visitors arriving to Fiji on a short-term basis are from the following countries or regions of residence:

| Country | 2019 | 2018 | 2017 | 2016 | 2015 |
|---|---|---|---|---|---|
| Australia | 367,020 | 365,660 | 365,689 | 360,370 | 367,273 |
| New Zealand | 205,998 | 198,718 | 184,595 | 163,836 | 138,537 |
| United States | 96,968 | 86,075 | 81,198 | 69,628 | 67,831 |
| China | 47,027 | 49,271 | 48,796 | 49,083 | 40,174 |
| United Kingdom | 16,856 | 16,297 | 16,925 | 16,712 | 16,716 |
| Canada | 13,269 | 13,220 | 12,421 | 11,780 | 11,709 |
| Japan | 14,868 | 11,903 | 6,350 | 6,274 | 6,092 |
| South Korea | 6,806 | 8,176 | 8,871 | 8,071 | 6,700 |
| Total | 894,389 | 870,309 | 842,884 | 792,320 | 754,835 |

Fiji has also served as a location for various Hollywood movies starting from the Mr Robinson Crusoe in 1932 to The Blue Lagoon (1980) starring Brooke Shields and Return to the Blue Lagoon (1991) with Milla Jovovich. Other popular movies shot in Fiji include Cast Away (2000) and Anacondas: The Hunt for the Blood Orchid (2004).

The U.S. version of the reality television show Survivor has filmed all of its semiannual seasons in the Mamanuca Islands since its 33rd season in 2016. Typically, two 39-day competitions will be filmed back to back, with the first season airing in the fall of that year and the second airing in the spring of the following year. This marks the longest consecutive period that Survivor has filmed in one location. Before the airing of the 35th season (Survivor: Heroes vs. Healers vs. Hustlers), host Jeff Probst said in an interview with Entertainment Weekly that the Mamanucas are the optimal location for the show and he would like to stay there permanently.

=== Transport ===
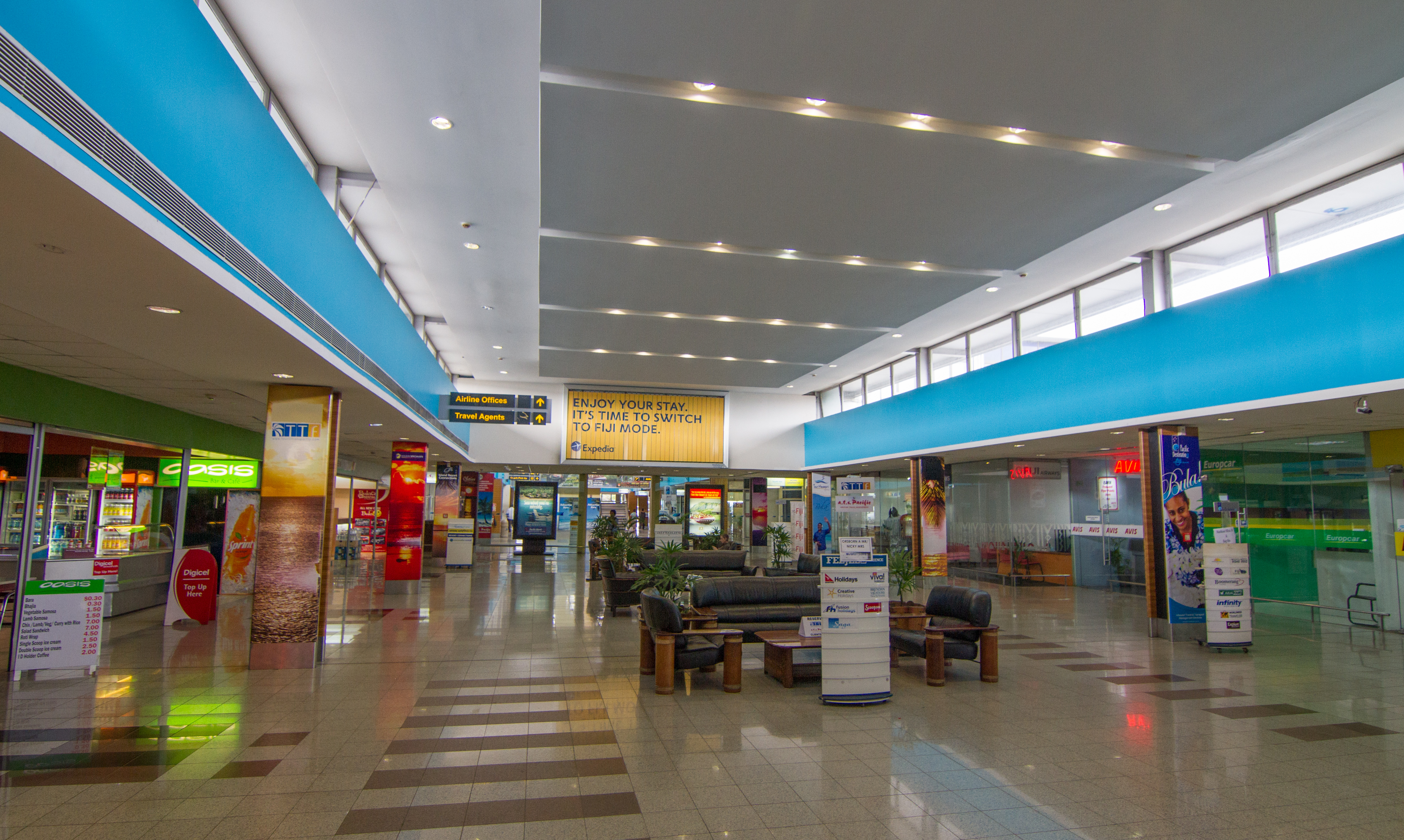
Nadi airport – arrivals

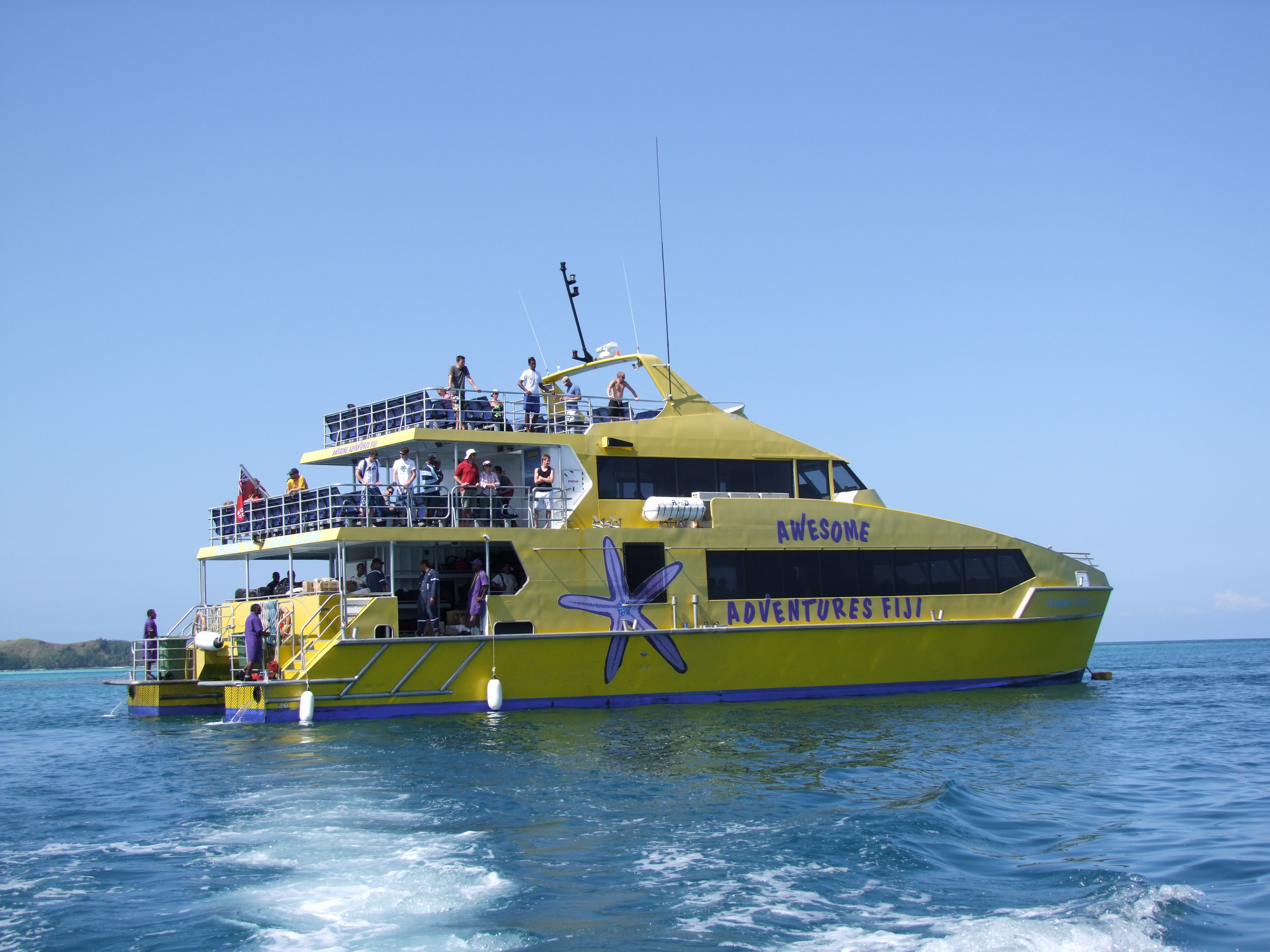
The Yasawa Flyer ferry connects Port Denarau near Nadi with the Yasawa Islands

Airports Fiji Limited (AFL) is responsible for the operation of 15 public airports in the Fiji Islands. These include two international airports: Nadi International Airport, Fiji's main international gateway, and Nausori Airport, Fiji's domestic hub, and 13 outer island airports. Fiji's main airline is Fiji Airways.

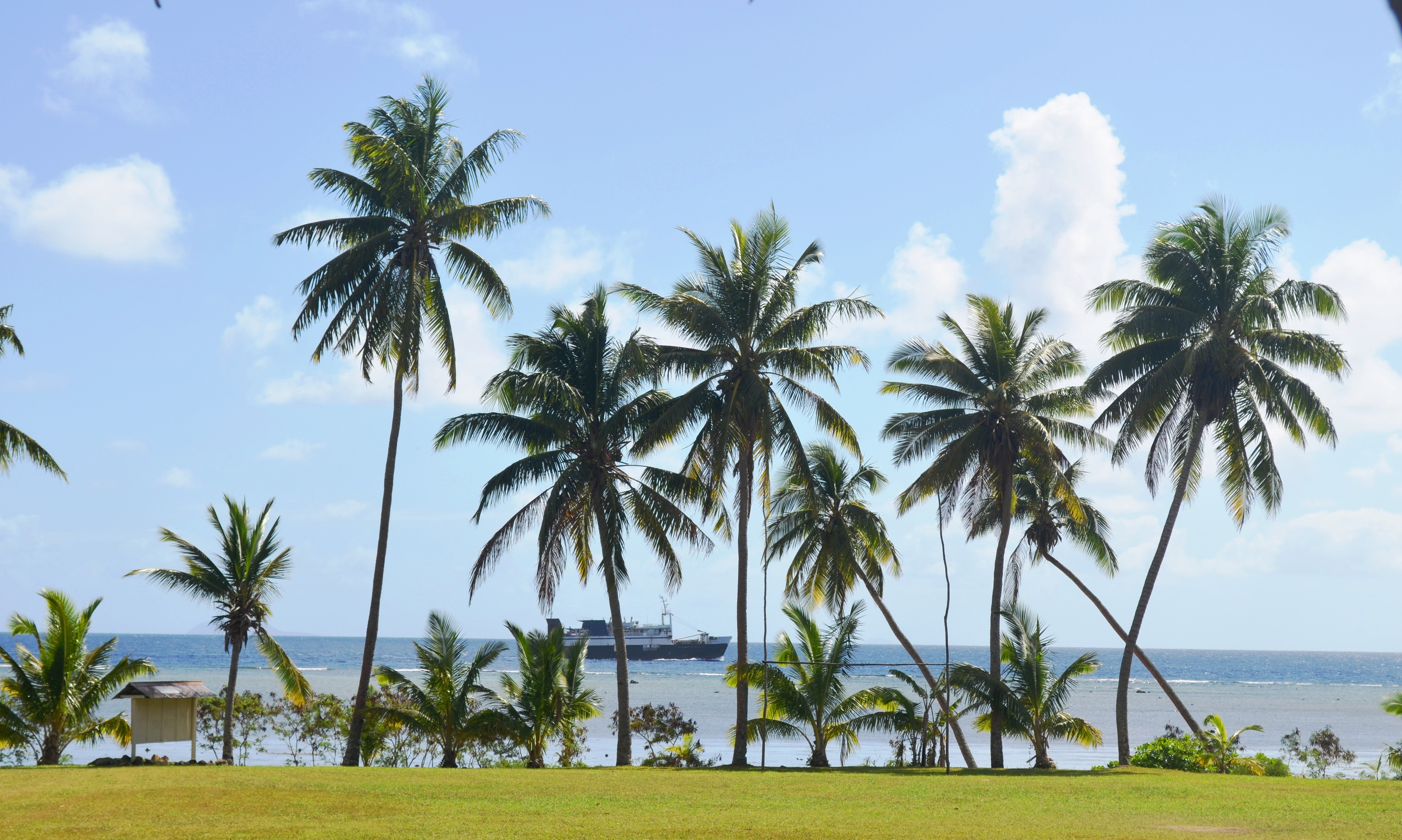
An inter-island vessel sails past one of the islands in the east of Fiji

The Nadi International Airport is located 9 kilometres (5.6 mi) north of central Nadi and is the largest Fijian hub. Nausori International Airport is about 23 kilometres (14 mi) northeast of downtown Suva and serves mostly domestic traffic, with its only international flights going to Tuvalu and Nauru. The main airport in the second largest island of Vanua Levu is Labasa Airport located at Waiqele, southwest of Labasa Town. The largest aircraft handled by Labasa Airport is the ATR 72.

Fiji's larger islands have extensive bus routes that are affordable and consistent in service. There are bus stops, and in rural areas buses are often simply hailed as they approach. Buses are the principal form of public transport and passenger movement between the towns on the main islands. Buses also serve on inter-island ferries. Bus fares and routes are regulated by the Land Transport Authority (LTA). Bus and taxi drivers hold Public Service Licenses issued by the LTA. Taxis are licensed by the LTA and operate widely all over the country. Apart from urban, town-based taxis, there are others that are licensed to serve rural or semi-rural areas.

Inter-island ferries provide services between Fiji's principal islands, and large vessels operate roll-on-roll-off services such as Patterson Brothers Shipping Company, transporting vehicles and large amounts of cargo between the main island of Viti Levu and Vanua Levu, and other smaller islands.

== Science and technology ==
Fiji is the only developing Pacific Island country with recent data for gross domestic expenditure on research and development (GERD), with the exception of Papua New Guinea. The National Bureau of Statistics cites a GERD/GDP ratio of 0.15% in 2012. Private-sector research and development (R&D) is negligible. Government investment in research and development tends to favour agriculture. In 2007, agriculture and primary production accounted for just under half of government expenditure on R&D, according to the Fijian National Bureau of Statistics. This share had risen to almost 60% by 2012. However, scientists publish much more in the field of geosciences and health than in agriculture. The rise in government spending on agricultural research has come to the detriment of research in education, which dropped to 35% of total research spending between 2007 and 2012. Government expenditure on health research has remained fairly constant, at about 5% of total government research spending, according to the Fijian National Bureau of Statistics.

The Fijian Ministry of Health is seeking to develop endogenous research capacity through the Fiji Journal of Public Health, which it launched in 2012. A new set of guidelines is now in place to help build endogenous capacity in health research through training and access to new technology.

Fiji is also planning to diversify its energy sector through the use of science and technology. In 2015, the Secretariat of the Pacific Community observed that "while Fiji, Papua New Guinea and Samoa are leading the way with large-scale hydropower projects, there is enormous potential to expand the deployment of other renewable energy options such as solar, wind, geothermal and ocean-based energy sources".

In 2014, the Centre of Renewable Energy became operational at the University of Fiji, with the assistance of the Renewable Energy in Pacific Island Countries Developing Skills and Capacity programme (EPIC) funded by the European Union. From 2013 to 2017, the European Union funded the EPIC programme, which developed two master's programmes in renewable energy management, one at the University of Papua New Guinea and the other at the University of Fiji, both accredited in 2016. In Fiji, 45 students have enrolled for the master's degree since the launch of the programme and a further 21 students have undertaken a related diploma programme introduced in 2019.

In 2020, the Regional Pacific Nationally Determined Contributions Hub Office in Fiji was launched to support climate change mitigation and adaptation. Pacific authors on the frontlines of climate change remain underrepresented in the scientific literature on the impact of disasters and on climate resilience strategies.

== Society ==
=== Demographics ===
Largest cities or towns in Fiji Source:
| Rank | Name | Province | Pop. |
|---|---|---|---|
| 1 | Suva | Rewa | 88,271 |
| 2 | Nadi | Ba | 71,048 |
| 3 | Nausori | Tailevu | 57,882 |
| 4 | Lautoka | Ba | 52,220 |
| 5 | Labasa | Macuata | 27,949 |
| 6 | Lami | Rewa | 20,529 |
| 7 | Nakasi | Naitasiri | 18,919 |
| 8 | Ba | Ba | 18,526 |
| 9 | Sigatoka | Nadroga-Navosa | 9,622 |
| 10 | Navua | Serua | 5,812 |

The 2017 census found that the population of Fiji was 884,887, compared to the population of 837,271 in the 2007 census. The population density at the time of the 2007 census was 45.8 inhabitants per square kilometre. The life expectancy in Fiji was 72.1 years. Since the 1930s the population of Fiji has increased at a rate of 1.1% per year. The median age of the population was 29.9, and the gender ratio was 1.03 males per 1 female.

Fiji's score on the 2024 Global Hunger Index (GHI) is 10.2, which indicates a moderate level of hunger.

=== Ethnic groups ===
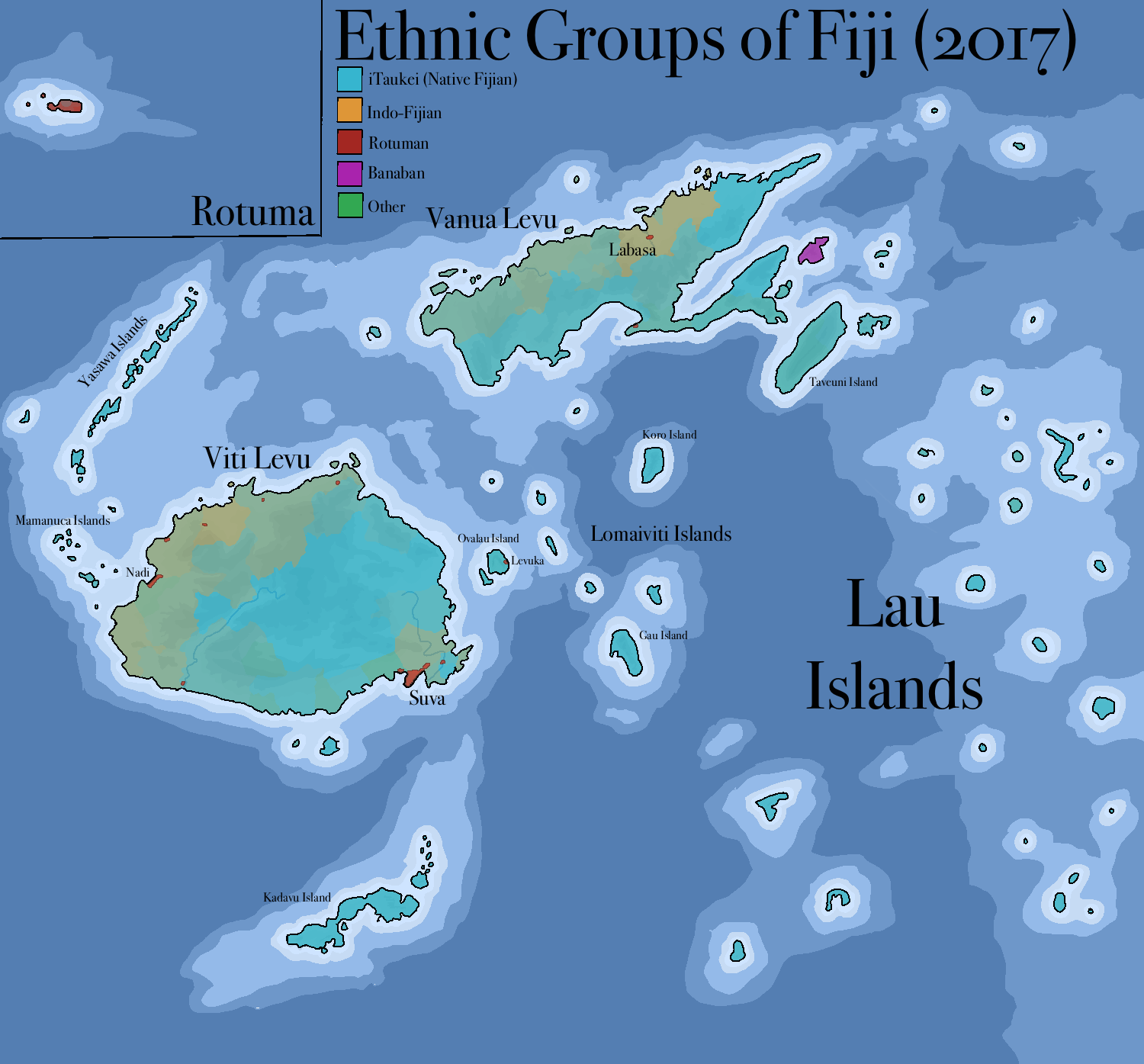
Ethnic Groups of Fiji as of 2017

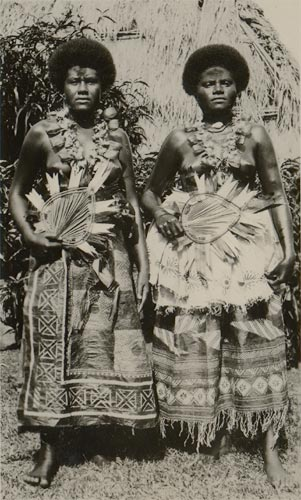
Native Fijian women, 1935

The population of Fiji is mostly made up of native Fijians (54.3%), who are Melanesians, although many also have Polynesian ancestry; and Indo-Fijians (38.1%), descendants of Indian contract labourers brought to the islands by the British colonial powers in the 19th century. The percentage of the population of Indo-Fijian descent has declined significantly over the last two decades through migration for various reasons. Indo-Fijians suffered reprisals for a period after the coup of 2000. Relationships between ethnic Fijians and Indo-Fijians in the political arena have often been strained, and the tension between the two communities has dominated politics in the islands for the past generation. The level of political tension varies among different regions of the country.

About 1.2% of the population is Rotuman – natives of Rotuma Island, whose culture has more in common with countries such as Tonga or Samoa than with the rest of Fiji. There are also small but economically significant groups of Europeans, Chinese, and other Pacific island minorities. The membership of other ethnic groups is about 4.5%. 3,000 people or 0.3% of the people living in Fiji are from Australia.

The concept of family and community is of great importance to Fijian culture. Within the indigenous communities, many members of the extended family will adopt particular titles and roles of direct guardianship. Kinship is determined through a child's lineage to a particular spiritual leader, so that a clan is based on traditional customary ties as opposed to actual biological links. These clans, based on the spiritual leader, are known as a matangali. Within the matangali are a number of smaller collectives, known as the [mbito]. The descent is patrilineal, and all the status is derived from the father's side.

=== Demonym ===
Fiji's constitution refers to all Fijian citizens as "Fijians". Former constitutions referred to citizens of Fiji as "Fiji Islanders", though the term Fiji nationals was used for official purposes. In August 2008, shortly before the proposed People's Charter for Change, Peace and Progress was due to be released to the public, it was announced that it recommended a change in the name of Fiji's citizens. If the proposal were adopted, all citizens of Fiji, whatever their ethnicity, would be called "Fijians". The proposal would change the English name of indigenous Fijians from "Fijians" to itaukei, the Fijian language endonym for indigenous Fijians. Deposed Prime Minister Laisenia Qarase reacted by stating that the name "Fijian" belonged exclusively to indigenous Fijians, and that he would oppose any change in legislation enabling non-indigenous Fijians to use it. The Methodist Church, to which a large majority of indigenous Fijians belong, also reacted strongly to the proposal, stating that allowing every Fiji citizen to call themselves "Fijian" would be "daylight robbery" inflicted on the indigenous population.

In an address to the nation during the constitutional crisis of April 2009, military leader and interim Prime Minister Voreqe Bainimarama, who was at the forefront of the attempt to change the definition of "Fijian", stated:

I know we all have our different ethnicities, our different cultures and we should, we must, celebrate our diversity and richness. However, at the same time we are all Fijians. We are all equal citizens. We must all be loyal to Fiji; we must be patriotic; we must put Fiji first.

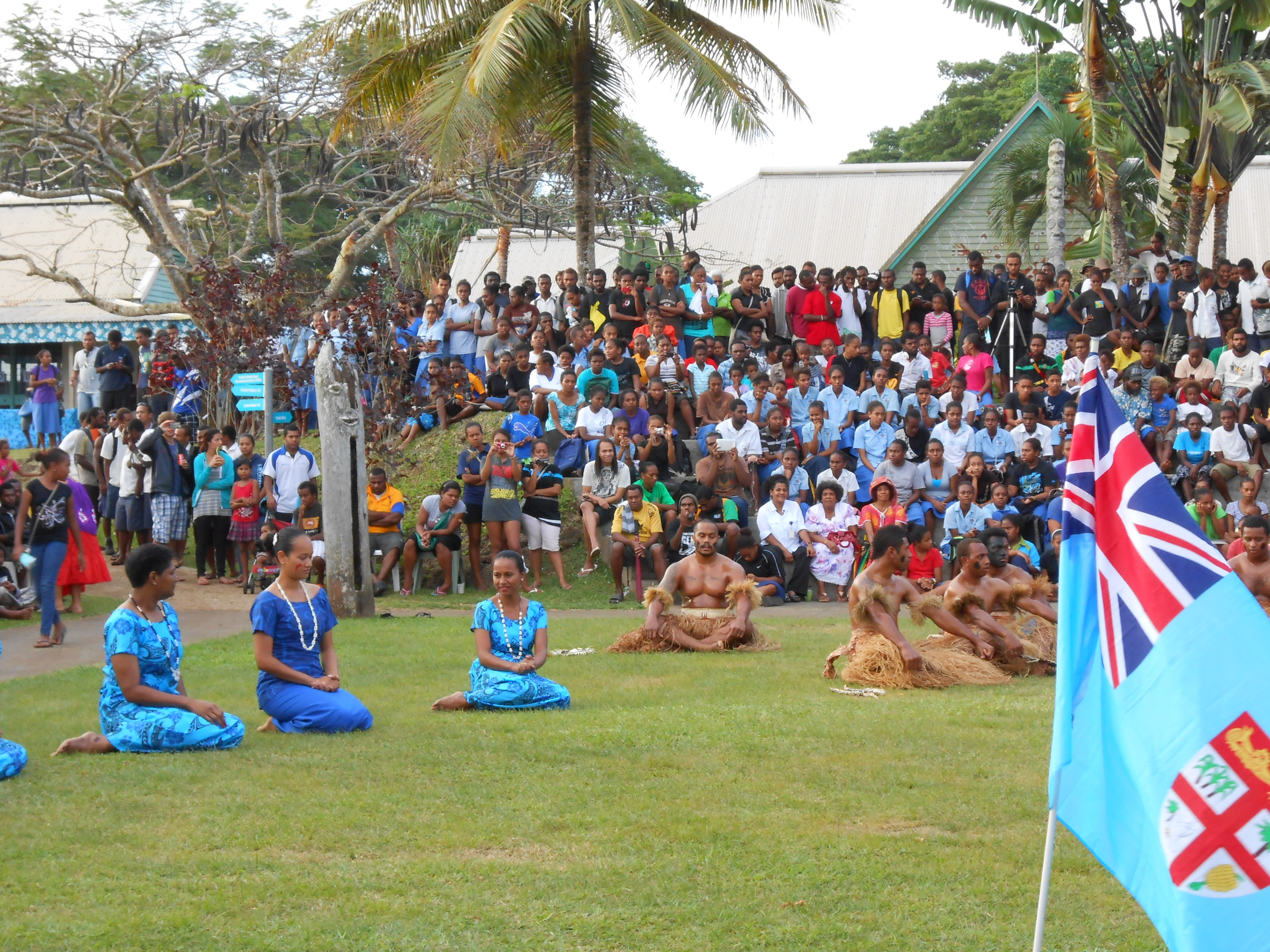
Fijians

In May 2010, Attorney-General Aiyaz Sayed-Khaiyum reiterated that the term "Fijian" should apply to all Fiji nationals, but the statement was again met with protest. A spokesperson for the Viti Landowners and Resource Owners Association claimed that even fourth-generation descendants of migrants did not fully understand "what it takes to be a Fijian", and added that the term refers to a legal standing, since legislation affords specific rights to "Fijians" (meaning, in that legislation, indigenous Fijians).

=== Languages ===
The 2013 Constitution states that all legislation must be available in English, Fijian (iTaukei), and Standard Hindi (the language of education for Indian Fijians). Additionally, conversational Fiji Hindi is compulsory taught in classrooms.

Fijian is an Austronesian language of the Malayo-Polynesian family spoken in Fiji. It has 350,000 native speakers, and another 200,000 speak it as a second language. There are many dialects of the language across the Fiji Islands, which may be classified in two major branches—eastern and western. Missionaries in the 1840s chose an eastern dialect, the speech of Bau Island, to be their written standard of the Fijian language. Bau Island was home to Seru Epenisa Cakobau, the chief who eventually became the self-proclaimed King of Fiji.

Fiji Hindi, also known as Fijian Baat or Fijian Hindustani, is the language spoken by most Fijian citizens of Indian descent. It is a koine derived mainly from Awadhi, an Eastern Hindi language. It has also borrowed a large number of words from Fijian and English. Indian indentured labourers were initially brought to Fiji mainly from districts of eastern Uttar Pradesh, Bihar, North-West Frontier and South India such as from Andhra and Tamil Nadu. They spoke numerous, mainly Eastern Hindi, language varieties, but 40% spoke Awadhi, and that became the basis of the koine. Later, Hindu and Muslim missionaries introduced standard Hindi/Urdu, which became the prestige language, somewhat like the position of French in Haiti. Today, basilectal Fiji Hindi and acrolectal standard Hindustani form a continuum, with the latter being the language of education and the primary written language, though there is some literature in Fiji Hindi. However, the 2013 Constitution (p. 23) states that "Conversational and contemporary iTaukei and Fiji Hindi languages shall be taught as compulsory subjects in all primary schools."

English, a remnant of British colonial rule over the islands, was the sole official language until 1997 and is widely used in government, business and education as a lingua franca.

| English | hello/hi | good morning | goodbye |
| Fijian | bula | yadra (pronounced yandra) | moce (pronounced mothe) |
| Fiji Hindi | नमस्ते (Namaste in general) राम राम (Ram Ram for Hindus) السلام علیکم (As-salamu alaykum for Muslims) | सुप्रभात (suprabhat) | अलविदा (alavidā) |

=== Religion ===
Religion in Fiji (2007)
1. Christian (69.2%)
2. Hindu (24.0%)
3. Muslim (5.80%)
4. Other or none (1.04%)

According to the 2017 census, 69.2% of the population was Christian, while 24.0% was Hindu, 5.8% Muslim, and 1.04% belonged to other religions including Sikhism. As of 2007, among Christians, 54% were counted as Methodist, followed by 14.2% Catholic, 8.9% Assemblies of God, 6.0% Seventh-day Adventist, 1.2% Anglican with the remaining 16.1% belonging to other denominations.

The largest Christian denomination is the Methodist Church of Fiji and Rotuma. With 34.6% of the population (including almost two-thirds of ethnic Fijians), the proportion of the population adhering to Methodism is higher in Fiji than in any other nation. Fijian Catholics are administered by the Archdiocese of Suva. The archdiocese is the metropolitan see of an ecclesiastical province which includes the Dioceses of Rarotonga (on the Cook Islands, for those and Niue, both New Zealand-associated countries) and Tarawa and Nauru (with see at Tarawa on Kiribati, also for Nauru) and the Mission sui iuris of Tokelau (New Zealand).

The Assemblies of God and the Seventh-day Adventist denominations are significantly represented. Fiji is the base for the Anglican Diocese of Polynesia (part of the Anglican Church in Aotearoa, New Zealand and Polynesia).These and other denominations have small numbers of Indo-Fijian members; Christians of all kinds comprised 6.1% of the Indo-Fijian population in the 1996 census. Hindus in Fiji mostly belong to the Sanatan sect (74.3% of all Hindus) or else are unspecified (22%). Muslims in Fiji are mostly Sunni (96.4%).

=== Education ===
Fiji has a high literacy rate (91.6 percent), and although there is no compulsory education, more than 85 percent of the children between the ages of 6 and 13 attend primary school. Schooling is free and provided by both public and church-run schools. Generally, the Fijian and Hindi children attend separate schools, reflecting the political split that exists in the nation.

Education system in Fiji
| Education | School/level | Grades | Years | Notes |
|---|---|---|---|---|
| Primary | Primary education | 1–8 | 8 | Education is not compulsory but is free through the first eight years. Schools from pre-school to secondary are mostly managed by either the government, religion (Catholic, Methodist, Sabha or Muslim) or provinces. |
| Secondary | Secondary education | 9–13 | 5 | Courses include carpentry, metalwork, woodwork, home economics, agricultural science, economics, accounting, biology, chemistry, physics, history, geography. English and maths are compulsory. |
| Tertiary | Diploma programs | | 2 | Higher education is offered at technical institutes and is structured around two-year diploma programs. There are also four or five-year professional degree programs in specific fields. |
| Tertiary | Bachelor's degree | | 3–5 | Higher education is offered at technical institutes and is structured around two-year diploma programs. There are also four or five-year professional degree programs in specific fields. |
| Tertiary | Master's degree | | 1–3 | Higher education is offered at technical institutes and is structured around two-year diploma programs. There are also four or five-year professional degree programs in specific fields. |

==== Primary education ====
In Fiji, the role of government in education is to provide an environment in which children realise their full potential, and school is free from age 6 to 14. The primary school system consists of eight years of schooling and is attended by children from the ages of 6 to 14 years. Upon completion of primary school, a certificate is awarded and the student is eligible to take the secondary school examination.

==== Secondary education ====
High school education may continue for a total of five years following an entry examination. Students either leave after three years with a Fiji school leaving certificate, or remain on to complete their final two years and qualify for tertiary education. Entry into the secondary school system, which is a total of five years, is determined by a competitive examination. Students passing the exam then follow a three-year course that leads to the Fiji School Leaving Certificate and the opportunity to attend senior secondary school. At the end of this level, they may take the Form VII examination, which covers four or five subjects. Successful completion of this process gains students access to higher education.

==== Tertiary education ====
The University of the South Pacific, called the crossroads of the South Pacific because it serves ten English-speaking territories in the South Pacific, is the major provider of higher education. Admission to the university requires a secondary school diploma, and all students must take a one-year foundation course at the university regardless of their major. Financing for the university is derived from school fees, funds from the Fiji government and other territories, and aid from Australia, New Zealand, Canada, and the United Kingdom. In addition to the university, Fiji also has teacher-training colleges, as well as medical, technological, and agricultural schools. Primary school teachers are trained for two years, whereas secondary school teachers train for three years; they then have the option to receive a diploma in education or read for a bachelor's degree in arts or science and continue for an additional year to earn a postgraduate certificate of education.

The Fiji Polytechnic School offers training in various trades, apprenticeship courses, and other courses that lead to diplomas in engineering, hotel catering, and business studies. Some of the course offerings can also lead to several City and Guilds of London Institute Examinations. In addition to the traditional educational system, Fiji also offers the opportunity to obtain an education through distance learning. The University Extension Service provides centres and a network of terminals in most regional areas. For students taking non-credit courses, no formal qualifications are necessary. However, students who enroll in the credit courses may be awarded the appropriate degree or certificate upon successful completion of their studies through the extension services.

== Culture ==
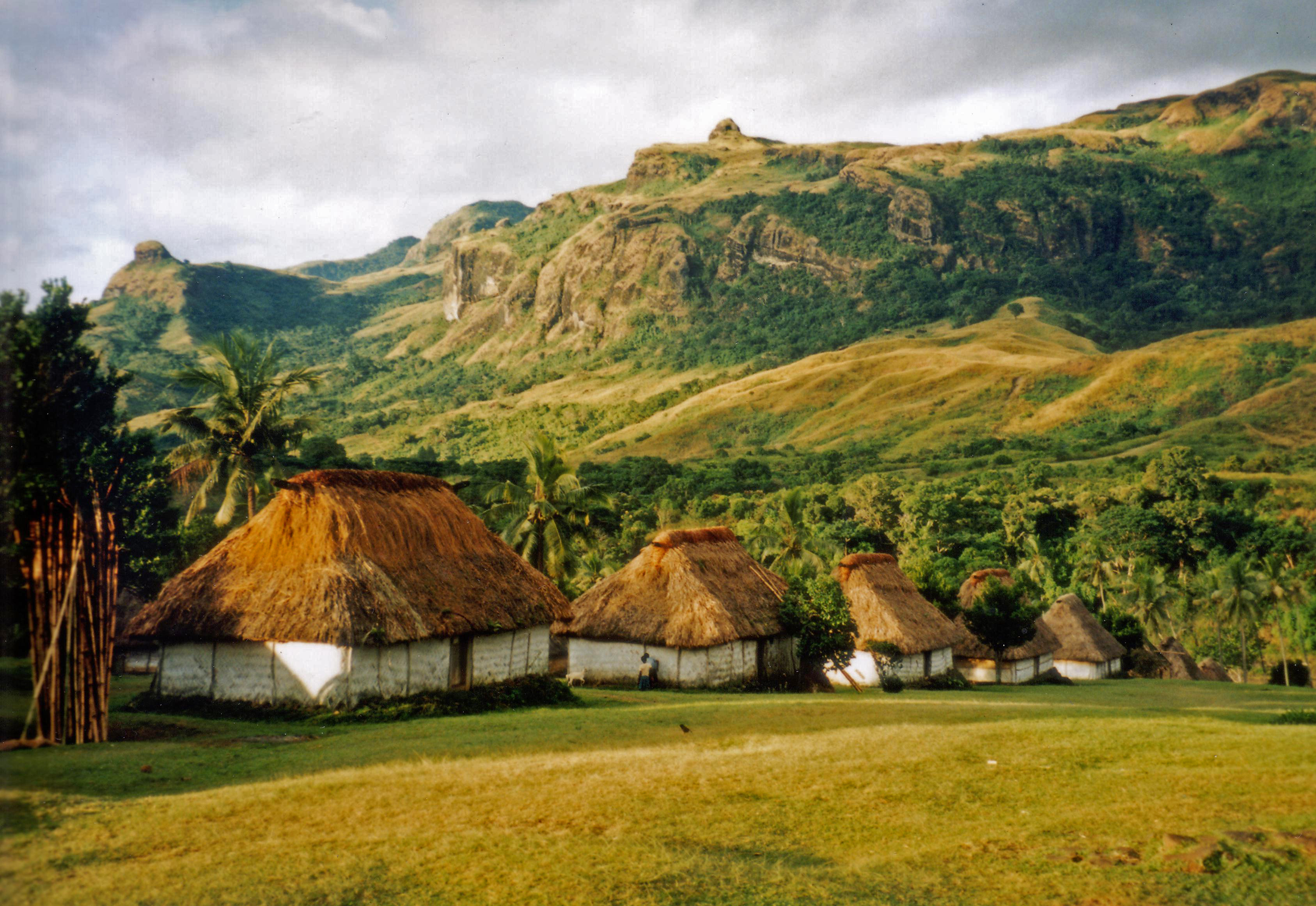
Several bure (one-room Fijian houses) in the village of Navala in the Nausori Highlands

While indigenous Fijian culture and traditions are very vibrant and are integral components of everyday life for the majority of Fiji's population, Fijian society has evolved over the past century with the introduction of traditions such as Indian and Chinese as well as significant influences from Europe and Fiji's Pacific neighbours, particularly Tonga and Samoa. Thus, the various cultures of Fiji have come together to create a unique multicultural national identity.

Fiji's culture was showcased at the World Exposition held in Vancouver, Canada, in 1986 and more recently at the Shanghai World Expo 2010, along with other Pacific countries in the Pacific Pavilion.

=== Sport ===
Sports are very popular in Fiji, particularly sports involving physical contact. Fiji's national sport is Rugby sevens. Cricket is a minor sport in Fiji. Cricket Fiji is an associate member of the International Cricket Council ("ICC"). Netball is the most popular women's participation sport in Fiji. The national team has been internationally competitive, at Netball World Cup competitions reaching 6th position in 1999, its highest level to date. The team won gold medals at the 2007 and 2015 Pacific Games.

Because of the success of Fiji's national basketball teams, the popularity of basketball has experienced rapid growth in recent years. In the past, the country only had few basketball courts, which severely limited Fijians who desired to practice the sport more frequently. Through recent efforts by the national federation Basketball Fiji and with the support of the Australian government, many schools have been able to construct courts and provide their students with basketball equipment.

Vijay Singh, a PGA golfer from Fiji, was ranked the world number one male golfer for a total of 32 weeks.

==== Rugby union ====
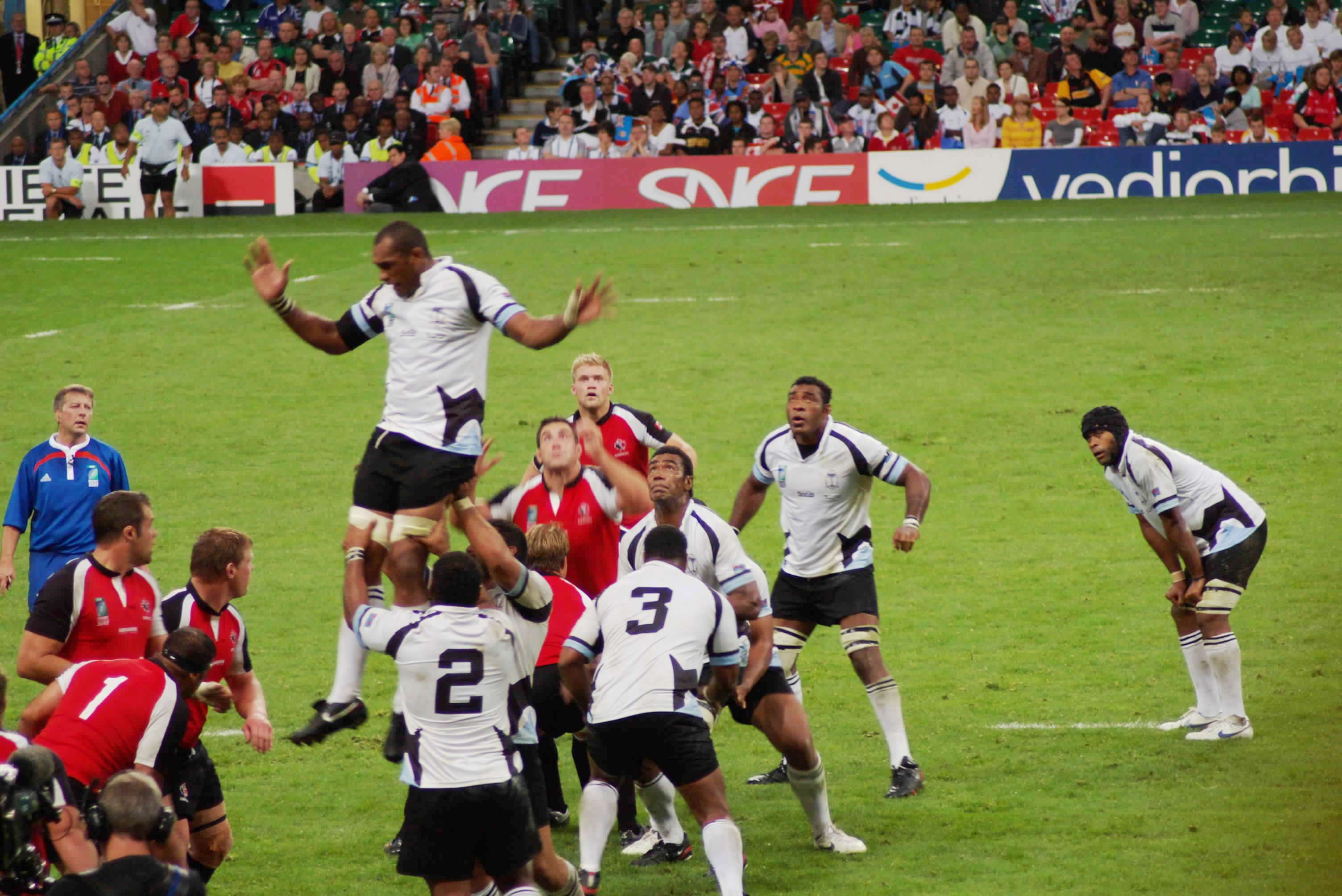
The Fiji national rugby union team during the 2007 Rugby World Cup playing against Canada

Rugby union is the most-popular team sport played in Fiji. The Fiji national sevens side is a popular and successful international rugby sevens team and has won the Hong Kong Sevens a record eighteen times since its inception in 1976. Fiji has also won the Rugby World Cup Sevens twice – in 1997 and 2005. The Fiji national rugby union sevens team is the reigning Sevens World Series Champions in World Rugby. In 2016, they won Fiji's first ever Olympic medal in the Rugby sevens at the Summer Olympics, winning gold by defeating Great Britain 43–7 in the final.

The national rugby union team is a member of the Pacific Islands Rugby Alliance formerly along with Samoa and Tonga. In 2009, Samoa announced their departure from the Pacific Islands Rugby Alliance, leaving just Fiji and Tonga in the union. Fiji is currently ranked eleventh in the world by the IRB (as of 28 December 2015). The national rugby union team has competed at five Rugby World Cup competitions, the first being in 1987, where they reached the quarter-finals. The team again qualified in the 2007 Rugby World Cup when they upset Wales 38–34 to progress to the quarter-finals where they lost to the eventual Rugby World Cup winners, South Africa.

Fiji competes in the Pacific Tri-Nations and the IRB Pacific Nations Cup. The sport is governed by the Fiji Rugby Union which is a member of the Pacific Islands Rugby Alliance, and contributes to the Pacific Islanders rugby union team. At the club level there are the Skipper Cup and Farebrother Trophy Challenge.

==== Rugby league ====
The Fiji national rugby league team, nicknamed the Bati (pronounced [mˈbatʃi]), represents Fiji in the sport of rugby league football and has been participating in international competition since 1992. It has competed in the Rugby League World Cup on three occasions, with their best results coming when they made consecutive semi-final appearances in the 2008 Rugby League World Cup, 2013 Rugby League World Cup and 2019 Rugby League World Cup. The team also competes in the Pacific Cup.

==== Association football ====
Association football was traditionally a minor sport in Fiji, popular largely amongst the Indo-Fijian community, but with international funding from FIFA and sound local management over the past decade, the sport has grown in popularity in the wider Fijian community. It is now the second most-popular sport in Fiji, after rugby for men and after netball for women.

The Fiji Football Association is a member of the Oceania Football Confederation. The national football team defeated New Zealand 2–0 in the 2008 OFC Nations Cup, on their way to a joint-record third-place finish. However, they have never reached a FIFA World Cup to date. Fiji won the Pacific Games football tournament in 1991 and 2003. Fiji qualified for the 2016 Summer Olympics men's tournament for the first time in history.

== See also ==
- Index of Fiji-related articles
- List of festivals in Fiji
- Outline of Fiji

== Cited sources ==
- Gravelle, Kim (1983). Fiji's Times: A History of Fiji. Fiji Times.
- Morens, David M. "Measles in Fiji, 1875: thoughts on the history of emerging infectious diseases". Pacific Health Dialog 5#1 (1998): 119–128 online.
- Scarr, Deryck (1984). Fiji: A short history. Institute for Polynesian Studies, Brigham Young University—Hawaii Campus. ISBN 978-0-939154-36-4. OCLC 611678101.

== Sources ==
- This article incorporates text from a free content work. Licensed under C-BY-SA 3.0 IGO. Text taken from UNESCO Science Report: the Race Against Time for Smarter Development., Schneegans, S., T. Straza and J. Lewis (eds), UNESCO.
