= Navtarang (Fiji) =

Radio Navtarang रेडियो नवतरंग

Fiji
- Broadcast area: Central, Western and Northern - Fiji
- Frequencies: 100.8–101.4 MHz
- Branding: Radio Navtarang

Programming
- Language: Hindi
- Format: Bollywood music

Ownership
- Owner: Communications Fiji Limited

History
- First air date: September 15, 1989

Links
- Website: http://navtarang.com.fj

Radio Navtarang (Hindi: रेडियो नवतरंग, English: New Waves) is a commercial, private owned Hindi FM radio station in Fiji. It is owned by the Communications Fiji Limited (CFL), company which also owns FM96-Fiji, Viti FM, Legend FM and Radio Sargam. Radio Navatarang is streaming in three frequencies: 101FM in Suva, Navua, Nausori, Labasa, Nadi & Lautoka, 100.8FM in Savusavu, Coral Coast, Ba & Tavua and on 101.4FM in Rakiraki.

The station signed on the air on September 15, 1989 with the song “Haste Haste Kat Jaye Raste, Zindagi Younhee Chalti Rahe” from the movie Khoon Bhari Maang. Late Anirudh Diwakar (former announcer of Radio Fiji Two)and former programs director of Radio Sargam initiated Radio Navtarang with its unique form of program lineup-trend setting radio style, which was emulated by many other Hindi radio stations in Fiji, New Zealand, Australia, Canada and United States of America.

Recent research done by Tebbutt Media Survey revealed that 38% of Fiji’s Indian population listen to Radio Navtarang out of four secular Hindi radio station in Fiji, making Radio Navtarang the most listened to Hindi radio station. The main competitors of Radio Navtarang are Fiji Broadcasting Corporation owned Radio Fiji Two and Mirchi FM. Radio Navtarang used to be a trendsetter Hindi Radio Station in the Pacific.

Some of the best and most capable radio personalities to emerge from Fiji such as Anirudh Diwakar, Noor Jahan, Vijay Varma, Saten Sharma, Shalen Sharma, Sneh Chaudhary, Shammi Lochan, amongst others have worked for Radio Navtarang.

During Anirudh Diwakar's term as programmes director, Radio Navtarang used to be the best Hindi radio in Fiji by far, however the quality of its programmes, standard of Hindi, quality of presenters and overall quality has declined significantly since then. Despite the deterioration in quality, however, Radio Navtarang is still the most popular Hindi radio station in Fiji.

== Program line-up ==
Radio Navtarang’s programme lineup is as follows

- 6.00am - 9am Breakfast Show : Satya Nand and Anamika Singh
- 9am - 2pm Midmorning Show: Jessica
- 2pm - 7pm Drive Time: Raj
- 5pm - 6pm Masala Mix: Satya, Jai, Jessica, Anamika
- 7pm - 12am The Tonight Show: Shresta
- 12am-5.30am Khwabe-e-Manzil: Natasha
- Thursday 7pm-12am Loveline: Shresta
- Saturday 6pm - 8pm Movie Magic & Bollywood Biography: Aniketh, Natasha
- Saturday Night Hangama 8pm - 12am: Aniketh, Natasha
- Sunday 9-11am Top 20 Countdown: Raj
- Sunday 11-12pm Navtarang's Radio Shopping: Raj
- Sunday 12-1pm Top of the Pops: Prashnil
- Sunday 3-5pm- Movers & Shakers: Prashnil
- Sunday Sukoon 7-12pm- Avishay

Satya Nand is the station’s current Senior Content Director.

== Current radio personalities ==
- Satya Nand - Senior Content Director
- Anamika Singh - Content Director
- Atishwar Chand
- Prashneel Prasad
- Avishay Kumar
- Jessica Lal
- Anishma Lal
- Aniketh Kumar
- Shresta Dutt

== Former radio jockeys ==
Radio jockeys that have worked with Navtarang include:

- Late Anirudh Diwakar
- Veena Bhatnagar
- Sashi Kanta
- Vijay Verma
- Ranjana Kumar
- Roshni Mala
- Sneh Chaudhry
- Rakesh Chand
- Shalen Sharma
- Saten Sharma
- Sangeeta Mani
- Pawan Rekha
- Shammi Lochan
- Renuka Goundar
- Charles Wakeham
- Lawrence Singh
- Sanjyotika Lata
- Jasmine Khan
- Jai Prasad
- Angeleen Sharma
- Sarvesh Singh
