= Fiji Village =

Fijian news website

Fiji Village (stylised Fijivillage) is an online news website in Fiji which is fully owned and operated by Communications Fiji Limited. It covers local, political, business, sporting, cultural, and other news items.

Fiji Village is affiliated with radio stations FM96, Viti FM, Navtarang, Radio Sargam and Legend FM.

== See also ==
- Culture of Fiji
