= Viti FM =

- Fiji
- Broadcast area: Central, Western and Northern Fiji
- Frequencies: 92 MHz; 103 MHz (Rakiraki, Nabouwalu)

Ownership
- Owner: Communications Fiji Limited

History
- First air date: 1996

Links
- Website: www.fijivillage.com

Viti FM is an iTaukei (Fijian) language - commercial radio station in Fiji. The station broadcasts on the 92 frequency to the cities of Suva, Navua, Nausori, Labasa, Savusavu, Nadi, Denarau, Mamanuca and Lautoka. The station also broadcasts on the 92 frequency to the towns of Coral Coast and Ba. The station broadcasts on 92 megahertz to the town of Tavua, and on 103 megahertz to Rakiraki and Nabouwalu.

It is operated by Communications Fiji Ltd, the company which also owns Radio Navtarang, Radio Sargam, Legend FM, and FM96-Fiji in Fiji.

Viti FM was launched in 1996. The rival stations of Viti FM are Fiji Broadcasting Corporation owned Bula FM and Radio Fiji One.

The station is managed by Atunaisa Kurumudu.
