= Sikivou =

Sikivou is a surname. Notable people with the surname include:

- Alipate Sikivou (died 1970), Fijian politician
- Semesa Sikivou (1917–1990), Fijian academic
