= Mirchi FM =

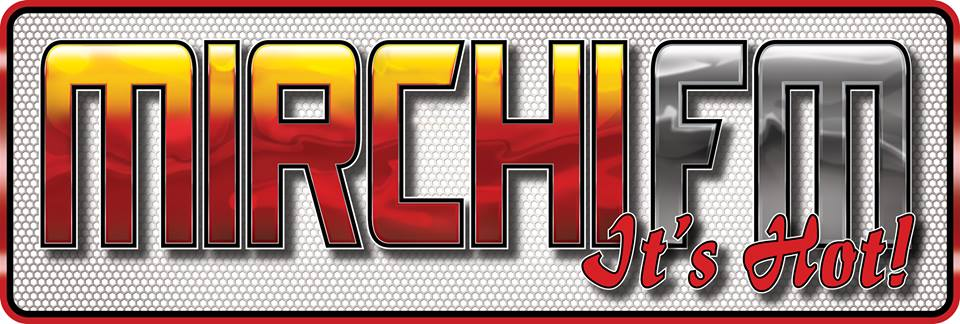
- Fiji
- Frequencies: 98.0 MHz, 97.6 MHz, 97.8 MHz and 98.2 MHz

Programming
- Language: Fiji Hindi

Ownership
- Owner: Fiji Broadcasting Corporation

History
- First air date: July 1, 1989

Links
- Webcast: http://player.streamguys.com/fbc/sgplayer/player.php?s=3&l=layout-standard
- Website: http://mirchifm.com.fj

Mirchi FM is a Fiji Hindi-language radio station in Fiji. The station broadcasts on the 97.8 frequency to the cities of Suva, Navua, Nausori, Labasa, Savusavu, Nadi, Denarau, Mamanuca and Lautoka. The station also broadcasts on the 97.6 MHz frequency to the towns of Coral Coast and Ba. The station broadcasts on 98.0 megahertz to the town of Tavua, and on 98.2 megahertz to Rakiraki and Nabouwalu. Mirchi FM is Fiji's first Hindi FM radio.

It is operated by Fiji Broadcasting Corporation, the company which also owns FBC TV, Radio Fiji One, Radio Fiji Two, Bula FM, 2day FM-Fiji, and Gold FM-Fiji in Fiji.

Mirchi FM was launched as 98FM on July 1, 1989. It later transformed into Radio Rajdhani before being rebranded as Bula 98 FM in 1998. In 2004, the station underwent another name change to Radio Mirchi. Enhancing its business perspective, the station adopted the name Mirchi FM on August 1, 2009. The main competitors of Mirchi FM are Communications Fiji Limited owned Radio Navtarang and Radio Sargam.

Mirchi FM is airing entertainment shows like Mast Morning, Saheli, Raftaar, Sham-e-Guzarish, Club Mircho, Mohabbato Ka Safar and Saturday Sports. Mirchi FM is essentially a music station featuring a range of popular Hindi songs from the 1990s to present era, including Bollywood music. Its target audience are younger listeners from the age of 18 to 40 years old.

== Program line-up ==
Mirchi FM's lineup is as follows:

- Behaal Breakfast 5.45am - 10.00am: Monish Sharma and Aziza
- Saheli 10 am - 2 pm: Renuka Goundar
- Raftaar 2 pm - 6 pm: Jitendra Shandil & Devika
- Sham-e-Guzarish 6pm - 7 pm: Sahil Ram
- Mirchi Nights 7 pm - 12am: Sahil Ram
- Club Mirchi Saturdays 7pm - 12am: Pisto

Ashneel Singh is the station’s current Radio Manager for Mirchi FM. Although he has been in the radio industry for around 20 years, he struggles with basic Hindi and voice quality. He claims proficiency in sound editing, broadcast technology and content creation and experience in organising small scale events event and marketing.

== Former radio jockeys ==
Radio jockeys that have worked with Mirchi FM include:

- Shammi Lochan Lal
- Jitendra Shyam
- Dharmendra Shyam
- Sashi Kanta
- Kaajal
- Rita Jeet
- Sangeeta Sharma
- Vijay Verma
- Sharit Singh
- Ranjana Kumar
- Angeleen Sharma
- Prem Chand
- Pranil Chand
- Jasmine Khan
- Deo Raj Raju
- Sandhaya Narayan
- Veena Kumar Bhatnagar
- Roneel Narayan
- Jeff Khan
- Ashok Lingam
- Pawan Rekha
- Sherin Prasad
- Rohit Ritesh Sharma
- Ashmita Sen
- Angie Raj
- Sharila Lazarus
- Saleshni Sen
- Neha Kumar/Shabana Azmi
- Lawerence Singh (Pisto)
