= 95.4 FM =

FM radio frequency

The following radio stations broadcast on FM frequency 95.4 MHz:

== Fiji ==
- 2day FM in Suva, Nadi, Lautoka, Yasawa, Labasa, Savusavu, and Taveuni

== China ==
- Conghua Radio in Conghua, Guangzhou

== Malaysia ==
- My in Johor Bahru, Johor and Singapore

== New Zealand ==
- The Rock in Palmerston North

== Ireland ==
- Classic Hits in West Cork
- Midlands 103 in Athlone

== United Kingdom ==
- BBC Radio Berkshire in Windsor
- BBC Radio Newcastle in Durham, South Northumberland and Tyne and Wear
- BBC Radio Wales in Wrexham and Chester
