= 1970 Rewa–Suva by-election =

Election in Fiji

- December 1970
	AP	NFP
Candidate	Uraia Koroi	Mosese Tuisawau	Taniela Vitata
Party	Alliance	NFP	NLP
Popular vote	2,197	1,637	229
Percentage	54.07%	40.29%	5.64%
MP before election
Alipate Sikivou
Alliance
Elected MP
Uraia Koroi
Alliance

A by-election for the Rewa–Suva seat in the House of Representatives of Fiji was held in December 1970 following the death of incumbent MP Alipate Sikivou in September 1970. The result was a victory for Uraia Koroi of the Alliance Party.

== Background ==
In the 1966 elections, the seat had been won by Alliance Party candidate Alipate Sikivou with 4,427 of the 7,474 valid votes (59.2%). Jone Cure Mataitini, an independent, finished second with 1,779 votes, whilst another independent candidate, Noa Niubalavu Nawalowalo, received 1,268 votes to finish third.

== Candidates ==
Three candidates contested the elections; Uraia Koroi, a programme organiser for Fijian language broadcasts at Radio Fiji, was the Alliance Party candidate. Ratu Mosese Varesekete Tuisawau, a brother in-law of Prime Minister Kamisese Mara, contested the elections on behalf of the National Federation Party, the first Fijian to contest the election on behalf of the party. The third candidate was Taniela Vitata, leader of the Dockworker and Seamen's Union, who ran on behalf of the National Liberal Party.

== Campaign ==
Unusually, the chief-oriented Alliance Party had a commoner as its candidate, whilst the Indo-Fijian dominated National Federation Party had a Fijian chief. Tuisawau received the backing of a leading Rewan chief, Senator Jone Mataitini, but was strongly opposed by the Fiji Times. During the campaign Tuisawau was involved in a fight with the editor of the Na Tovata newspaper of the Alliance Party. He received strong support in Rewa, but very little in Suva.

== Results ==
Vitata lost his $100 deposit after receiving less than 10% of the vote. Voter turnout was just under 40%.

Candidate	Party	Votes	%
Uraia Koroi	Alliance Party	2,197	54.07
Mosese Varesekete Tuisawau	National Federation Party	1,637	40.29
Taniela Vitata	National Liberal Party	229	5.64
Total		4,063	100.00
Source: Pacific Islands Monthly
