= Gold FM =

Gold FM may refer to:

- Gold 905, an English radio station in Singapore
- Gold FM (Fiji), an English language radio station in Fiji
- Gold FM (Sri Lanka), a radio station in Sri Lanka
- Gold FM, a network of radio stations operated by Kalayaan Broadcasting System in the Philippines
- 92.5 Gold FM, an Australian radio station in Queensland
- Gold (New Zealand radio network) a New Zealand radio station
- AIR FM Gold, radio channel in multiple Indian cities
- Gold 101.7, an Australian radio station formerly known as WSFM.
