= Radio Fiji Two =

- Fiji
- Frequencies: 104.8–105.4 MHz

Programming
- Language: Hindi
- Format: Public Service Broadcaster

Ownership
- Owner: Fiji Broadcasting Corporation

History
- First air date: July 1, 1954

Links
- Webcast: http://player.streamguys.com/fbc/sgplayer/player.php?s=5&l=layout-standard
- Website: http://radiofijitwo.com.fj

Radio Fiji Two is a Hindi-language public service broadcaster in Fiji. The station broadcasts on the 105 frequency to the cities of Suva, Navua, Nausori, Labasa, Savusavu, Nadi, Denarau, Mamanuca and Lautoka. The station also broadcasts on the 104.8 frequency to the towns of Coral Coast and Ba. The station broadcasts on 105.2 megahertz to the town of Tavua, and on 105.4 megahertz to Rakiraki and Nabouwalu. It is popular with rural and maritime populations, and the average age of listeners is 45 years.

It is operated by Fiji Broadcasting Corporation, the company which also owns FBC TV, Radio Fiji One, Mirchi FM, Bula FM, 2day FM-Fiji, and Gold FM-Fiji in Fiji.

Radio Fiji Two initiated its broadcasting on 1 July 1954. Featuring multilingual religious music in the morning, news and community messages, drive time music play, talk back shows, birthday announcements, interviews, favourite music plays and much more. Featuring a range of popular Hindi songs from the 1950s to present era.

The station aims to entertain, educate, and inform its audience while preserving and promoting cultural traditions and encouraging understanding among the diverse communities of Fiji. Through music, news, commentary, and informational programming, it serves listeners of varied ethnic and religious backgrounds. Its programming includes substantial local content and contributions from specialists who address a wide range of cultural topics. Regular features include news and sports updates, interviews, and discussions covering issues of importance and interest to the Indo-Fijian community.

The programs are sponsored by the government under the Public Service Broadcast (PSB) contract, from private organizations and religious organizations in Fiji. Radio Fiji Two provides opportunities to local businesses to market their products to a specialized niche market by advertising on air.

== Announcers ==
Radio Fiji Two's lineup is as follows:

- Humsafar 6.00am - 10am: Parneel Chand & Sheenam Roy
- Ghar Sansaar 10am - 12pm: Mohini Lata
- Suhana Safar 12pm - 3pm:Shelvin Lal
- Bachcho Ki Duniya - 3pm - 4pm: Moreen Karan
- Mastana Safar 3pm - 6pm: Moreen Karan
- Mahekti Ratein 6pm - 12am: Ravin Singh
- Super shaniwaar (Saturday) 6am -12pm: Avinesh Raj
- Mastana Bahar (Saturday) 6pm - 12am:Sherine Prasad
- Damdaar Raviwaar (Sunday) 12pm - 6pm: Akansha Narayan
- Bazmei Ghazal (Sunday)6pm -12am Jashmin Khan

== Former radio jockeys ==
Radio jockeys that have worked with Radio Fiji Two include:

- Late Ambika Nand
- Late Shri Dewakar Prasad
- Late Shri Sami Mudaliar
- Late Shri Puran Ji Charan
- Late Shri Odho Ji Bhai
- Late Pallavi Shweta
- Jagdish Maharaj
- Hemant Vimal Sharma
- Jitendra Shyam
- Nitya Nand
- Roshil Maharaj
- Dharmendra Shyam
- Sashi Kanta
- Ranjana Kumar
- Deo Raj Raju
- Pranil Chand
- Yashmin Ali
- Veena Kumar Bhatnagar
- Roneel Narayan
- Jeff Khan
- Prabha Mishra
- Pawan Rekha
- Rohit Ritesh Sharma
- Late Sunil Raj
- Pronol Rae
- Tej Ram Prem
- Avinesh Raj
- Late Anirudh Diwakar
- Late Vijay Dutt Sharma
- Vandhana Prasad
- Sherine Prasad
- Late Ramesh Chandra
- Yashmin Ali
- Late Vidyawati Jairam
- Arunesh Kumar
- Yogen Maharaj
- Prem Chand
- Rup Chand
- Sunil Lata
- Nirmal Kumar
- Ashok Lingam
- Yogesh Sharma
