= Thurston Gardens =

Botanical gardens in Suva, Fiji

Coordinates: 18.1491°S 178.4247°E

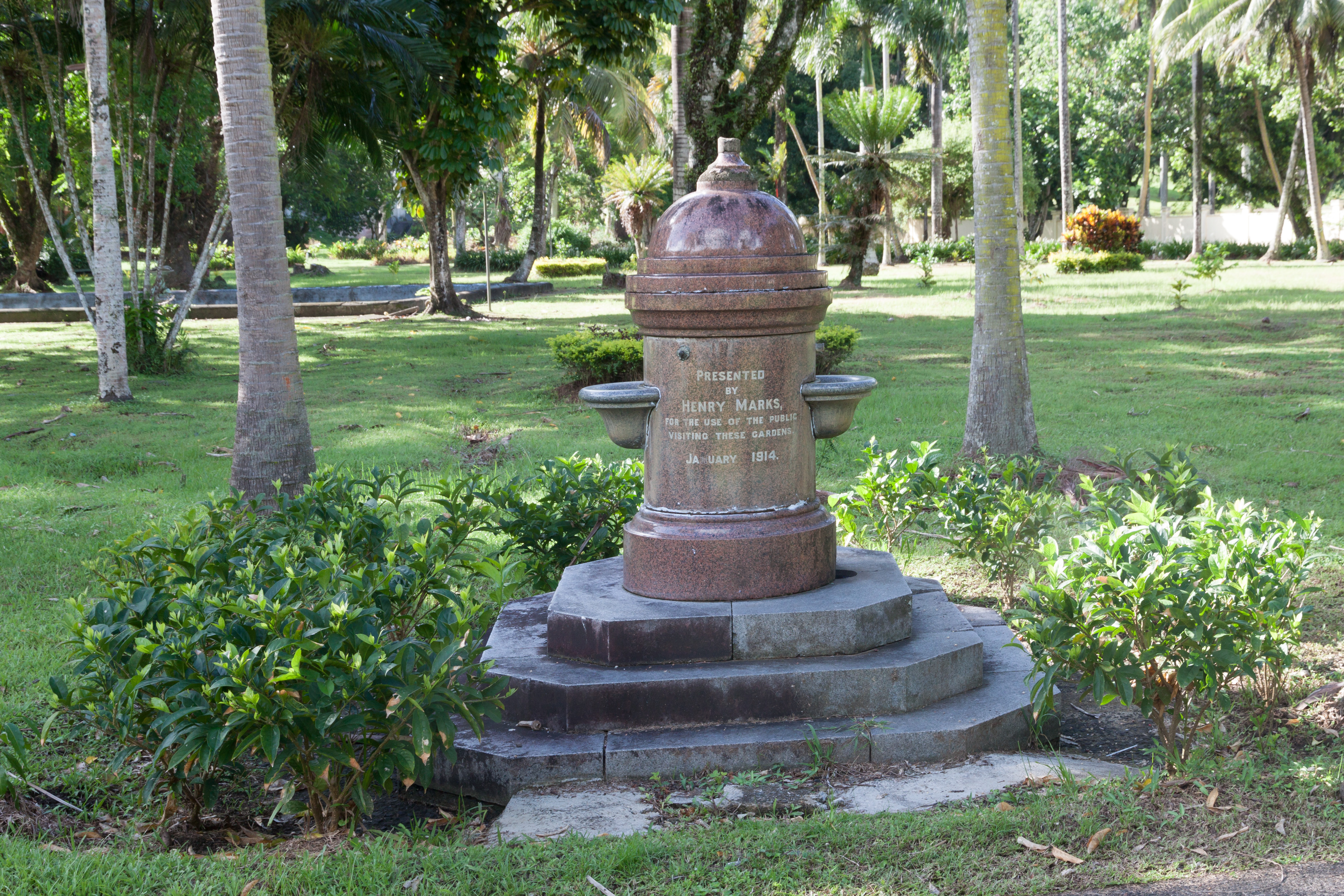
- Type: Municipal
- Location: Suva, Fiji
- Created: 1880s
- Visitors: unknown
- Status: Open all year

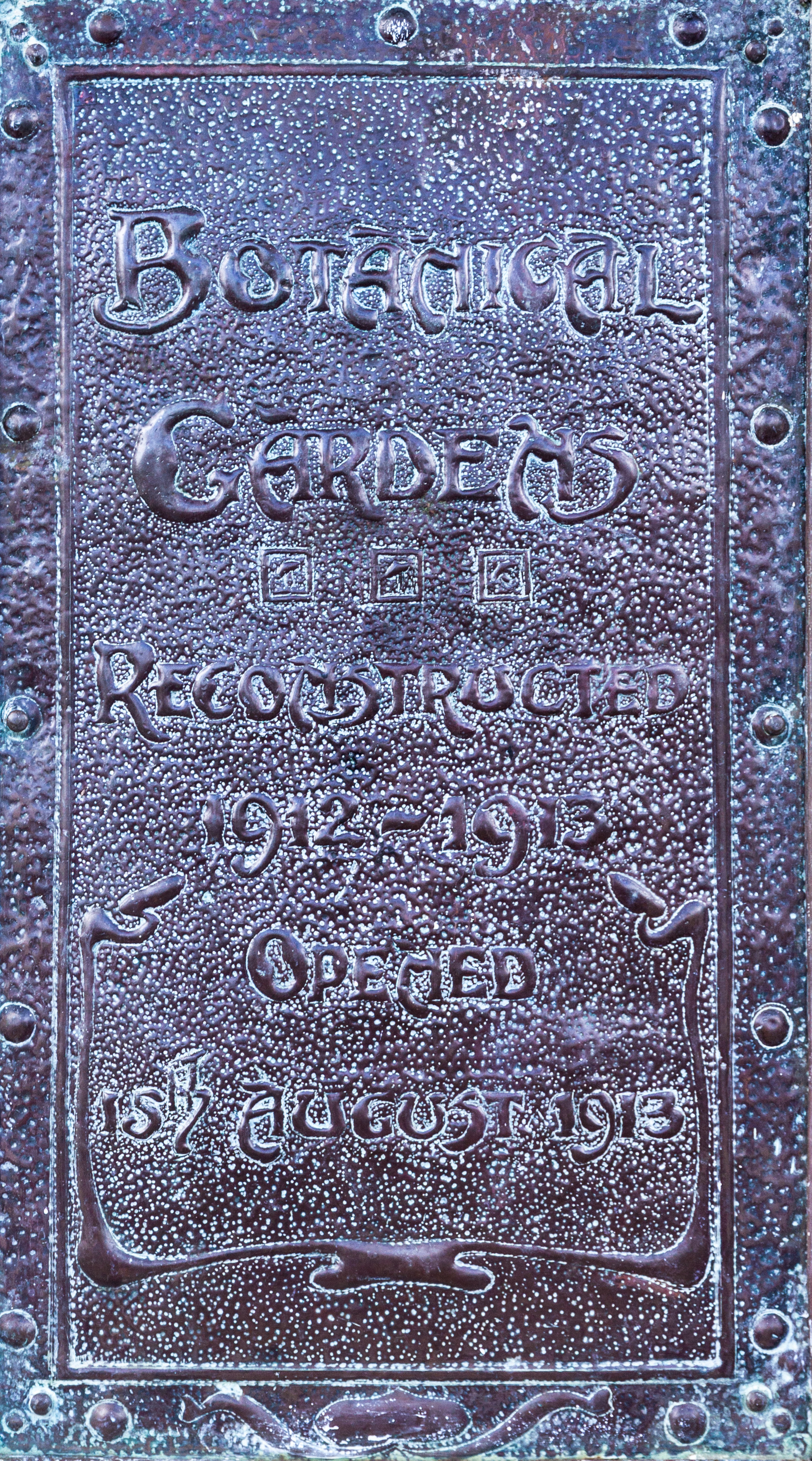
The plaque at the entrance to the Thurston Gardens, showing its former name, the Suva "Botanical Gardens"

Thurston Gardens are the botanical gardens of Fiji. They used to be known as the Suva Botanical Gardens but its name was changed in honour of the fifth Governor of Fiji, Sir John Bates Thurston, who was Governor from February 1888 to March 1897. Thurston Gardens is located in central Suva, between Albert Park and the Government House.

== History ==
Thurston Gardens are built on the site of the original town of Suva that was burned in 1843 in one of the bloodiest fights in Fiji's history. Many of the inhabitants were killed and eaten by the people of Rewa. In 1879, Sir John Thurston invited and asked John Horne (Botanist), the Director of Forests and Botanic Gardens in Mauritius to visit and make recommendations for a Botanical Garden. The gardens were originally named Suva Botanical Gardens, but were renamed in 1976 in memory of Sir John Thurston. In 1913 the Gardens were reorganized and drains were laid underground. The avenues of 101 Royal Palms and 39 tree ferns were also planted. The Clock Tower and band stand were constructed in 1918 in memory of the first mayor of Suva. The Fiji Museum, now occupies the building that was built in the Botanical Garden grounds in 1955.

=== The Gardens Today ===
The Fiji Museum is currently maintaining the gardens. Although many of the buildings and artifacts seem to be in need of attention the gardens are still regularly enjoyed by the people of Suva during the day. Spread throughout the grounds are varieties of palms, gingers, water lilies and other local flora.
