= Veniana Tuibulia =

Fijian judo player

Personal information
- Born: Suva, Fiji
- Weight: 52 kg (115 lb)

Sport
- Sport: Judo
- Event: 52 kg

Veniana Tuibulia is a Fijian athlete who competed in judo.

She won a bronze medal in the 2003 Oceania Judo Championship, in the category of -52 kg.

== International Medals ==
Oceanía Championship,
Year	Place	Medal	Category
2003	Suva	Bronze	–52 kg
