= Bula FM =

- Fiji
- Frequency: 102.4–103 MHz

Programming
- Language: Fijian

Ownership
- Owner: Fiji Broadcasting Corporation

History
- First air date: October 20, 1996

Links
- Webcast: http://bulafm.fbc.com.fj/listen
- Website: http://bulafm.fbc.com.fj/

Bula FM is an iTaukei (Fijian) language - commercial radio station in Fiji. The station broadcasts on the 102.6 frequency to the cities of Suva, Navua, Nausori, Labasa, Savusavu, Nadi, Denarau, Mamanuca and Lautoka. The station also broadcasts on the 102.4 frequency to the towns of Coral Coast and Ba. The station broadcasts on 102.8 megahertz to the town of Tavua, and on 103 megahertz to Rakiraki and Nabouwalu.

It is operated by Fiji Broadcasting Corporation, the company which also owns FBC TV, Radio Fiji One, Radio Fiji Two, Mirchi FM, 2Day FM (Fiji), and Gold FM (Fiji) in Fiji.

Bula FM was launched as Bula 102FM on October 20, 1996, and was rebranded as Bula FM in 2004. To give better business outlook the logo of the station was changed on 1 August 2009.

Bula FM is airing entertaining shows like: Matakavou, Vakatara, Lali-Ni-Yakavi, Yadra Bogi, Mai Na Veirara Ni Qito, Lali Ni Bogi, and Vakanananu Lesu. Bula FM caters listeners aging from 18 to 40 years in Fiji, including outer islands and the World through live streaming.
