= Legend FM =

Fiji
- Broadcast area: Central, Western and Northern Fiji
- Frequencies: 98.6 – 99.4 MHz

Programming
- Format: Adult contemporary

Ownership
- Owner: Communications Fiji Limited

History
- First air date: 2002

Links
- Website: http://www.fijivillage.com/

Legend FM is a nationwide commercial English FM radio station in Fiji. It is owned by the Communications Fiji Limited (CFL), company which also owns FM96-Fiji, Viti FM, Radio Navtarang and Radio Sargam. Legend FM is streaming in three frequencies: 98.6FM in Suva, Navua, Nausori, Labasa, Nadi and Lautoka; 99FM in Savusavu, Coral Coast, Ba and Tavua; and 99.4FM in Rakiraki. Legend FM can also be accessed online with the subscription fee of 70USD for a year.

This station hit the air in 2002. Legend FM plays the hits from the 1960s, 1970s, 1980s and 1990s and across the various genres from rock to disco, soul to reggae. The main competitors of Legend FM are Mix FM-Fiji, Gold FM-Fiji and 2day FM-Fiji.

Legend FM is managed by Charles Taylor.
