= Alipate Sikivou =

Fijian politician

Member of the Legislative Council
- In office 1966–1970
- Preceded by: Seat created
- Succeeded by: Uraia Koroi
- Constituency: Rewa–Suva

Personal details
- Died: 5 September 1970 Suva, Fiji
- Party: Alliance Party

Alipate Vuate Sikivou (died 5 September 1970) was a Fijian politician. He served as a member of the Legislative Council from 1966 until his death in 1970.

== Biography ==
The younger brother of politician Semesa Sikivou, Alipate entered the civil service in 1945. He joined the Territorial Forces in 1948, before fully enlisting in the army in 1951. In 1952 he began a tour of duty in Malaya as part of the Malayan Emergency. After being discharged from the army, he became clerk of the Native Lands Commission and later executive officer of the Fijian Affairs Board.

In the 1966 general elections he contested the Rewa–Suva seat as the Alliance Party candidate, and was elected to the Legislative Council. He had a stroke in January 1970, and died in hospital in Suva in September. His death led to the 1970 Rewa–Suva by-election.
