= FBC TV =

Television channel in Fiji

- Country: Fiji
- Broadcast area: National
- Headquarters: 69 Gladstone Road, Suva

Programming
- Languages: English, Hindi, Fijian
- Picture format: PAL-576i (SDTV 16:9) /w A2 Stereo

Ownership
- Owner: Fiji Broadcasting Corporation

History
- Launched: November 25, 2011

Links
- Website: http://fbctv.com.fj/

Availability

Terrestrial
- Analogue: VHF Band (Deuba, Navua, Suva, Nausori, Korovou, Coral Coast, Rakiraki, Labasa, Savusavu, Taveuni, Nadi, Lautoka, Yasawa, Mamanuca) * UHF Band (Ba, Tavua, Nabouwalu)

FBC TV is an entertainment and news channel based in Fiji broadcasting in English, Hindi and Fijian. It is the third commercial free to air channel in Fiji. It was launched on 25 November 2011 by the Fiji Prime Minister - Rear Admiral (Ret.) Frank Bainimarama. It covers 90% of Fiji's population through VHF and UHF TV Band. Fiji Television, Mai TV and PBS TV are the main competitors of FBC TV in the country. FBC TV is operated by Fiji Broadcasting Corporation, the company which also runs 6 radio stations, Radio Fiji One (iTaukei), Radio Fiji Two (Hindustani), Gold FM-Fiji (English), Bula FM (Fijian), 2day FM-Fiji (English) and Mirchi FM (Hindi). It had sold over $100,000 worth of television programming, even before it had officially signed on air.

FBC TV was first suggested in 1968 as part of a television feasibility study that would give the corporation a television station.

FBC TV lifted the standard of local television news coverage by bringing in a top New Zealand news producer for months to train their local TV journalists. Its signal now reaches places in Fiji where no TV signal was available previously.

Mai TV was first to break Fiji Television's monopoly but did not have the years of market domination and exclusivity Fiji TV had been given to build its powerful position. FBC, already a successful radio broadcaster, became a powerhouse when it launched FBC TV, with support from the Government.

FBC TV was given exclusive rights in Fiji to telecast Miss World 2012. In October, 2013, it acquired the rights to exclusively air the 2013–14 Premier League live on its free-to-air channel. as well as the 2013 Constellation Cup.

The government enacted a Television (Cross-Carriage of Designated Events) Decree to strip away exclusive sports content owned by Fiji TV and make those lucrative content available to the financially struggling FBC TV, headed by Riyaz Saiyed-Khaiyum, its chief executive officer. The official reason given was that all Fijians should have access to important world events including sports which included the FIFA World Cup as well as the World Rugby Sevens Series, the Rugby World Cup, Rugby League World Cup, the World Netball Championship, the Olympic Games, the Commonwealth Games, the Pacific Games, the Pacific Mini Games, the Coca-Cola Games, state funerals, general election results, the national budget address and parliamentary proceedings. This allowed FBCTV the rights to broadcast these major events on free-to-air.

In November 2014, FBCTV was tasked with the job of managing the digital TV project to allow the transition of broadcast signals from analogue to Digital television in Fiji. In July 2015, it commenced tests in the Suva, Nasinu corridor.

In August 2016, when Fiji moved into Digital broadcasting, FBC launched two more channels, FBC 2 and FBC Plus. For the Walesi TV launch draw, the main FBC channel was granted channel 1 and FBC 2, channel 3.

FBC 2 would provide viewers with content from other parts of the world which Fijians could not access on free-to-air television.

FBC Plus provided viewers with shows that were aired on FBC TV, three hours after its broadcast on FBC TV. For example, if the Indian soap opera Pavitra Rishta had aired on FBC TV at 12:00 p.m, FBC Plus would air the same show at 3:00 p.m.

After a successful trial of the Digital Television platform in the Suva - Nasinu corridor, the country's first Digital TV platform, Walesi was launched on the 25th of June 2018, by the Attorney General, Aiyaz Sayed-Khaiyum in his portfolio as Minister for Communications.

The Digital Television service is encrypted/scrambled and requires a Walesi provided set top box everytime, to view all the encrypted/scrambled (marked by $) channels, even "free-to-air" (really free-to-view) ones, making televisions already in stores with built-in DVB-T2 tuners with MPEG-4/H.264 video codec support for UHF antennas useless, as Walesi does not have any digital receiver (flat screen) Fiji specifications or certification (like Freeview used in Australia and New Zealand) to support Integrated Digital Television (iDTV) unlike most other countries. As of January 2023, the Education Channel is the only channel that is truly free-to-air (FTA), as opposed to free-to-view that supports iDTV (not locked/unencrypted) and can be received with any DVB-T2 television without a Walesi set top box, by selecting Channel Bandwidth as 8 MHz in manual scan and search for the right UHF frequency or selecting your country as New Zealand (Which uses 8Mhz and also uses the same EU band plan) and running an auto scan.

== Programming ==
Hindi

- Aaina - Talk Back Show
- Aladdin (Zee TV) (aired 2011–2016)
- Khana Khazana

- Pavitra Rishta (aired 2011–2019)
- Yahan Main Ghar Ghar Kheli (aired 2012–2015)

- Saturday Blockbuster Movie
- The World of Bollywood- Zing TV (aired 2011–2016)

- Qubool Hai (aired 2015–2018)
- Zing Music Videos (aired 2011–2016)

iTaukei

- Bati Ni Tanoa (aired 2011–2018) [re-launched late 2019]
- B.G.P.T Sunday Church Service

- FRU Rugby Talk Back Show

- Na Vakekeli

- Na Waqe

- Souls to Jesus (moved to MaiTV)

English

- Justified
- Breaking Bad
- Keeping Up with the Kardashians (aired 2012- 2014)
- Aljazeera (aired 2012- )
- The A-Team (aired 2011–2014)
- Alcatraz (aired 2012–2013) [Season 1 only]
- Hawaii Five-O (aired 2012-early 2019)
- Supernatural (aired 2017–2019)
- Lethal Weapon (aired 25 April 2018-)
- Kicking and Screaming (aired 2018 -)
- Survivor: Fiji (aired 2018)
- Survivor: Millennials vs. Gen X (aired 2018)
- Zoo: TV Series (aired 2016–2018)
- Lois & Clark: The New Adventures of Superman (aired 2016–2018)
- Arrested Development (aired 2012–2014)
- Indian Documentary

- Juke World (aired 2011-), [hosts changed]
- Movie Tok (aired 2012-), [male host replaced by Allan Stevens]
- PopCorn TV (aired 2011–2013)
- Speak Your Mind
- 30 Rock (season 3)
- The Good Wife (season 4)
- Sunday Movie Madness

- Pretty Little Liars
- The Bold and the Beautiful
- The Daily Show (aired 2011–2014), [hosted by Jon Stewart before Trevor Noah takeover]
- Hell Date (aired 2011–2013)
- The Hills (aired 2011–2013)
- Murder She Wrote (aired 2012–2014)

- The Legend of Bruce Lee
- The Nations Business
- The X Factor (British TV series) (aired 2017–)
- The X Factor (American TV series)(aired 2012–2016)
- World of Football
- CCTV 9 Documentary
- France 24
- Extreme Makeover: Home Edition

Korean

- The Iron Empress
- Jeong Do-jeon
- The Cinderella Sisters

== Kids Program ==
- Blue's Clues

- Dora the Explorer

- Danny Phantom

- Sesame Street

- SpongeBob SquarePants

- Kung Fu Panda: Legends of Awesomeness

== Teen Sitcoms ==
- Drake & Josh

- iCarly

- Supah Ninjas

- Double Dare 2000

- The Avatar Series

== Previous shows ==
- Satyamev Jayate (TV series)
- 30 Rock (Season 1)
- 30 Rock (Season 2)
- Alcatraz
- Babylon 5
- Sons of Anarchy
- Hawaii Five-0
- Big Time Rush
- Band of Brothers
- Traffic Light
- Burn Notice (season 1)
- Penguins of Madagascar
- Go Go Giggles

- The Big Bang Theory
- The Fresh Prince of Bel-Air
- Alfred Hitchcock Presents
- It's Always Sunny in Philadelphia
- How I Met Your Mother
- Little Mosque on the Prairie
- Outsourced (TV series)
- Sports Fishing International
- NCIS (TV series)
- Nikita

- Supernanny
- The Amazing Race Asia 1
- The Amazing Race Asia 2
- The Amazing Race Asia 3
- The Amazing Race Asia 4
- Supah Ninjas
- American Horror Story

- The Good Wife
- The Sensitive Samurai
- Tour of Duty
- The Wonder Years
- Victorious
- Total Rugby
- Jimmy Neutron
- The Secret Circle
- The Walking Dead (TV series)
- The Newsroom
- Yahaan Main Ghar Ghar Kheli
