= Radio Fiji One =

Fiji
- Frequencies: 92.8 MHz, 93 MHz, 93.2 MHz, 93.4 MHz and 558 kHz

Ownership
- Owner: Fiji Broadcasting Corporation

History
- First air date: July 1, 1954

Links
- Webcast: http://rf1.fbc.com.fj/listen
- Website: http://rf1.fbc.com.fj/

Radio Fiji One (NA DOMOIVITI) is an iTaukei (Fijian) language - public service broadcaster in Fiji. The station broadcasts on the 93megahertz and 558 kilohertz to the cities of Suva, Navua, Nausori, Labasa, Savusavu, Nadi, Denarau, Mamanuca and Lautoka. The station also broadcasts on the 92.8 frequency to the towns of Coral Coast and Ba. The station broadcasts on 93.2 megahertz to the town of Tavua, and on 93.4 megahertz to Rakiraki and Nabouwalu.

It is operated by Fiji Broadcasting Corporation, the company which also owns FBC TV, Radio Fiji Two, Mirchi FM, Bula FM, 2Day FM (Fiji), and Gold FM (Fiji) in Fiji.

The programs are sponsored by the government under the Public Service Broadcast (PSB) contract, from private organizations and religious organizations in Fiji.
