= FM96 (Fiji) =

Radio station in Fiji

Fiji
- Broadcast area: Central, Western and Northern Fiji
- Frequencies: 96 to 96.4 MHz

Programming
- Format: Variety

Ownership
- Owner: Communications Fiji Limited

History
- First air date: July 5, 1985

Links
- Webcast: http://player.streamtheworld.com/player.php?callsign=FM96
- Website: https://fm96.com.fj

FM96 is an English language - commercial radio station in Fiji. The station broadcasts on the 96.2 frequency to the cities of Suva, Navua, Nausori, Labasa, Savusavu, Nadi, Denarau, Mamanuca and Lautoka. The station also broadcasts on the 96 frequency to the towns of Coral Coast and Ba. The station broadcasts on 96.4 megahertz to Rakiraki and Nabouwalu.

It is operated by Communications Fiji Limited the company which also owns Radio Navtarang, Radio Sargam, Legend FM, and Viti FM in Fiji.

FM96 was launched on July 5, 1985. The station is focusing more on a core market of westernized listeners under 25 years.

The music selection runs from 1999 until present. It plays a selection of RnB, hip-hop, rock, rap, pop, dance music and reggae, as well as local music. FM96 is also the only radio station in Fiji that carries AT40 with Ryan Seacrest.
