= Gold FM (Fiji) =

- Fiji
- Frequencies: 100–100.6 MHz

Programming
- Format: Classic

Ownership
- Owner: Fiji Broadcasting Corporation

History
- First air date: 1 July 1954

Links
- Webcast: http://goldfm.fbc.com.fj/listen
- Website: http://goldfm.fbc.com.fj/

Gold FM is an English language – commercial radio station in Fiji. The station broadcasts on the 100.2 frequency to the cities of Suva, Navua, Nausori, Labasa, Savusavu, Nadi, Denarau, Mamanuca and Lautoka. The station also broadcasts on the 100 frequency to the towns of Coral Coast and Ba. The station broadcasts on 100.2 megahertz to the town of Tavua, and on 100.4 megahertz to Rakiraki and Nabouwalu.

It is operated by Fiji Broadcasting Corporation, the company which also owns FBC TV, Radio Fiji One, Radio Fiji Two, Bula FM, 2day FM-Fiji, and Mirchi FM in Fiji.

Gold FM was launched on 1 August 2009 after undergoing many changes. From its days as Radio Fiji Three, to Bula 100 and Radio Fiji Gold, it is a longstanding radio station in Fiji.

Gold FM plays the hits from the 1970s, 1980s and 1990s and across various genres from rock to disco, soul to reggae.

Gold FM is airing entertaining shows like: Breakfast Show, The Center Show, The Ride, The Premium Classic, and Saturday Night Party Time.
