= 2day FM (Fiji) =

2day FM Fiji
Suva; Fiji
- Branding: 2day FM

Programming
- Format: Adult Contemporary

Ownership
- Owner: Fiji Broadcasting Corporation

History
- First air date: 31 December 2002

Links
- Webcast: http://2dayfm.fbc.com.fj/listen
- Website: http://2dayfm.fbc.com.fj/

2Day FM (call sign: 2DAY) is an English language commercial FM radio station broadcasting in Suva, Fiji, on the frequencies of 95.4 MHz in Suva, Nadi, Lautoka, Yasawa, Labasa, Savusavu, and Taveuni, on 95.2 MHz in Sigatoka and Ba, 95.6 MHz in Tavua and Vatukoula, and 95.8 MHz in Rakiraki and is part of Fiji Broadcasting Corporation's Network, The National Broadcaster of Fiji, who also owns FBC TV, Radio Fiji One, Radio Fiji Two, Bula FM, Gold FM (Fiji), and Mirchi FM in Fiji.

The station strives to educate, inspire and inform the youths while playing today's hit music.

== History ==
=== 2002 ===
The Original Station Logo

2day FM was launched on 31 December 2002 under the then Fiji Broadcasting Corporation Limited with its first Logo and original slogan ""The Home of Today's Hit Music""

The music selection runs from 1999 until the present. It plays a selection of RnB, hip-hop, rock, rap, pop, dance music, and reggae. The station is a major supporter of local music in Fiji promoting up and coming local musicians and their work, also holding numerous events promoting Homegrown Music.

=== 2009 ===
2day FM underwent a revamp and re-brand in August 2009 with a new look logo symbolizing a new outlook for FBC and its sister stations under the Fijian Broadcasting Corporation.

== Shows ==
- Biscuits For Breakfast
- Midway Thrill
- The Traffic Jam
- The System After Dark
- Weekend Breakfast
- Weekend Drive
- The Kryp2nyt Show
- The Sunday Night Kruizer

== Schedule ==
=== Weekdays ===
- Biscuits For Breakfast (Breakfast Show) - Time: 05:45AM – 10:00AM, with Bob & Sharon
- Midway Thrill - Time: 10:00AM – 02:00PM, with Jane
- Traffic Jam - Time: 02:00PM – 6:00PM, with Pauline & Pita
- System After Dark - Time: 06:00PM – 12:00AM, With Ses

=== The Weekend Shows ===
- Weekend Breakfast - Time: 06:00AM – 12:00PM
- Weekend Drive - Time: 12:00PM – 06:00PM
- The Kryp2nyt Show - Time: 06:00PM – 12:00AM (Saturday)
- The Sunday Night Kruizer - Time: 06:00PM – 12:00AM
