= Fijian Broadcasting Corporation =

Fijian Broadcasting Corporation फिजी प्रसारण कॉरपोरशन (Hindi) Fiji Prasaran Corporation (Fiji Hindi) Kabani ni kakaburaki e Viti (Fijian)
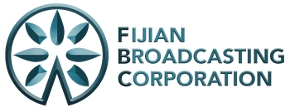
- Country: Fiji
- Broadcast area: National
- Headquarters: Suva, Fiji

Programming
- Languages: English, Hindi, Fijian

Ownership
- Owner: Government of Fiji

History
- Launched: 1954

Links
- Website: www.fbc.com.fj

The Fijian Broadcasting Corporation (FBC) is one of the two radio broadcasters in Fiji. It was known as Fiji Broadcasting Commission when it began. It traces its history to 1935 when it first began operating under licence from the Posts and Telegraphs Department with the call sign ZJV. At the end of 1952, the legislative council passed the Broadcasting Commission Bill. The commission members were appointed in June 1953. On 1 July 1954, the commission's first programme was broadcast as part of the official opening ceremony.

In January 1998 the Fiji Broadcasting Commission was corporated under the government's public sector reform programme and renamed Island Networks Corporation Limited. In June 1999, the new Government led to another change in name – this time to the Fiji Broadcasting Corporation Limited. Today it operates six radio stations; two in each of the major local languages (Fijian, Hindustani, and English) and its first free-to-air television FBC TV was launched on 25 November 2011.

The CEO of FBC was Riyaz Sayed-Khaiyum, a former Fiji Television journalist. In November 2019, they relaunched with a new name and logo, Fijian Broadcasting Corporation.

== Stations ==
- Radio Fiji One (i Taukei)
- Bula FM (Fijian)
- Radio Fiji Two (Hindi)
- Mirchi FM (Hindi)
- Gold FM (Fiji) (English)
- 2Day FM (Fiji) (English)
- FBC TV Hindi, i Taukei, English content
- FBC 2 Public Service Broadcast Channel
- FBC Sports 24 hour sports channel

Radio Fiji One and Radio Fiji Two are classified public service broadcast stations governed under a contract between the government and the FBC which allows the government to "buy" airtime on those stations as well as contributing towards its operations and costs. The other four stations are licensed under commercial which means they are funded through advertisements.

=== Frequencies ===
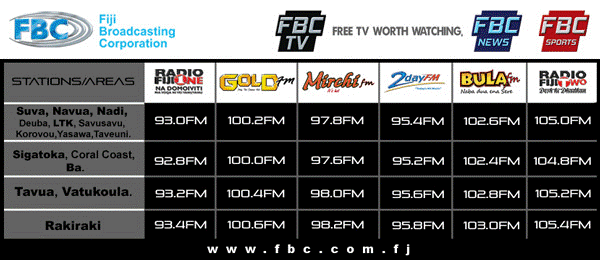
