= Suva =

Capital and largest city of Fiji

Coordinates: 18.1416°S 178.4419°E

Suva सुवा (Fiji Hindi)
- Capital city
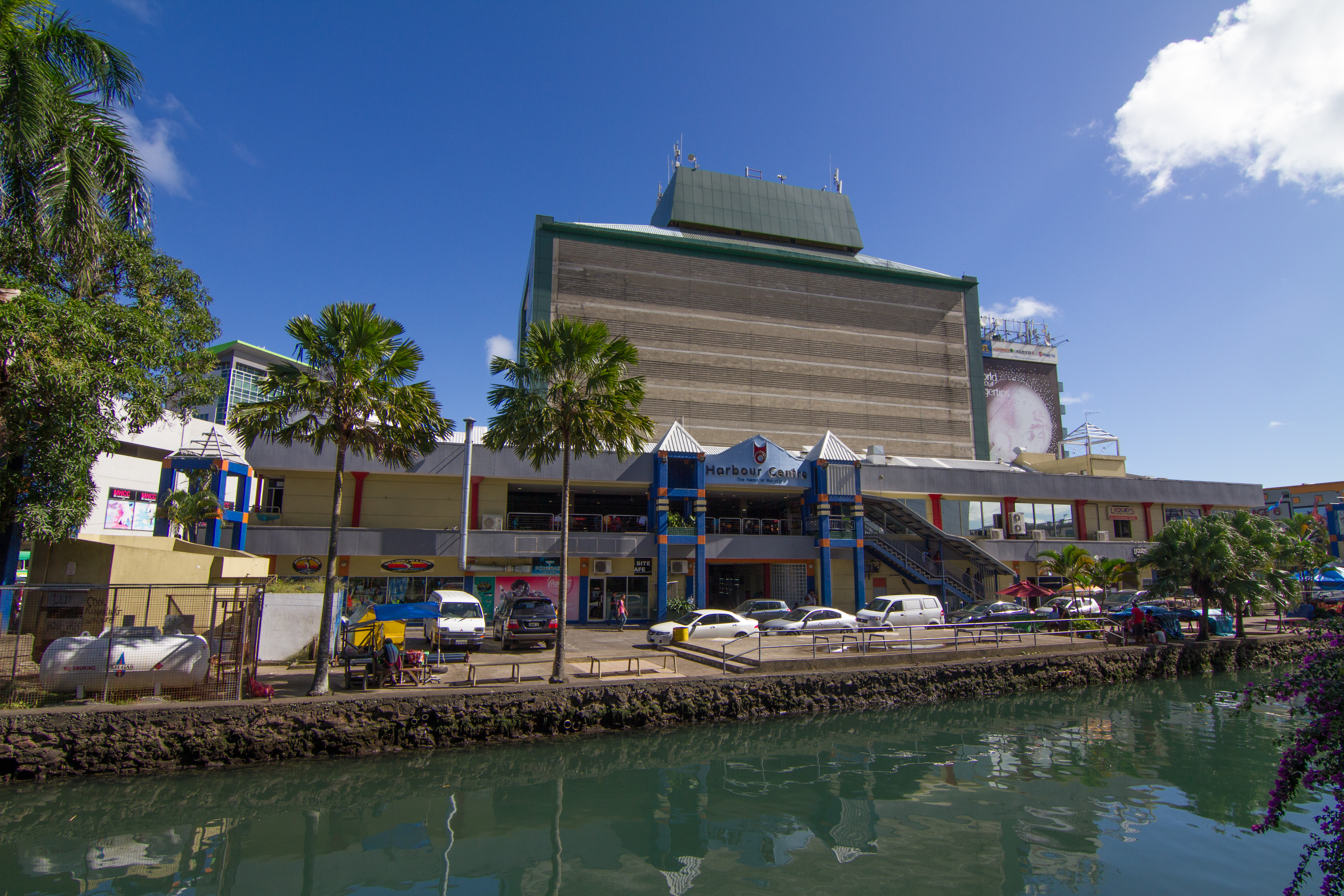
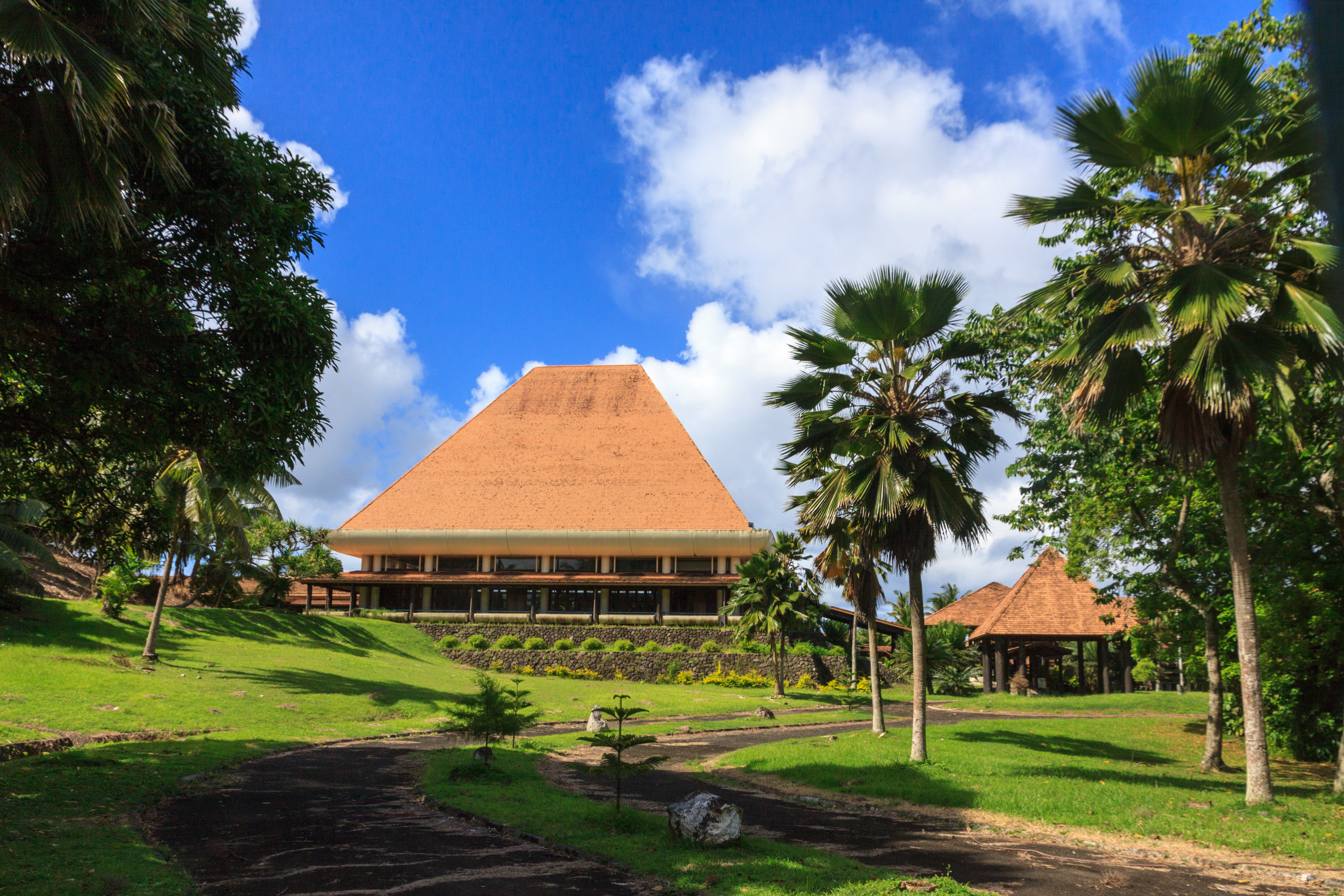
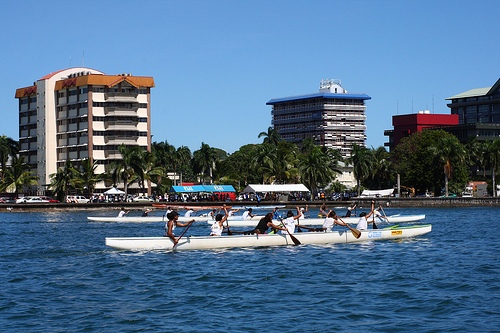
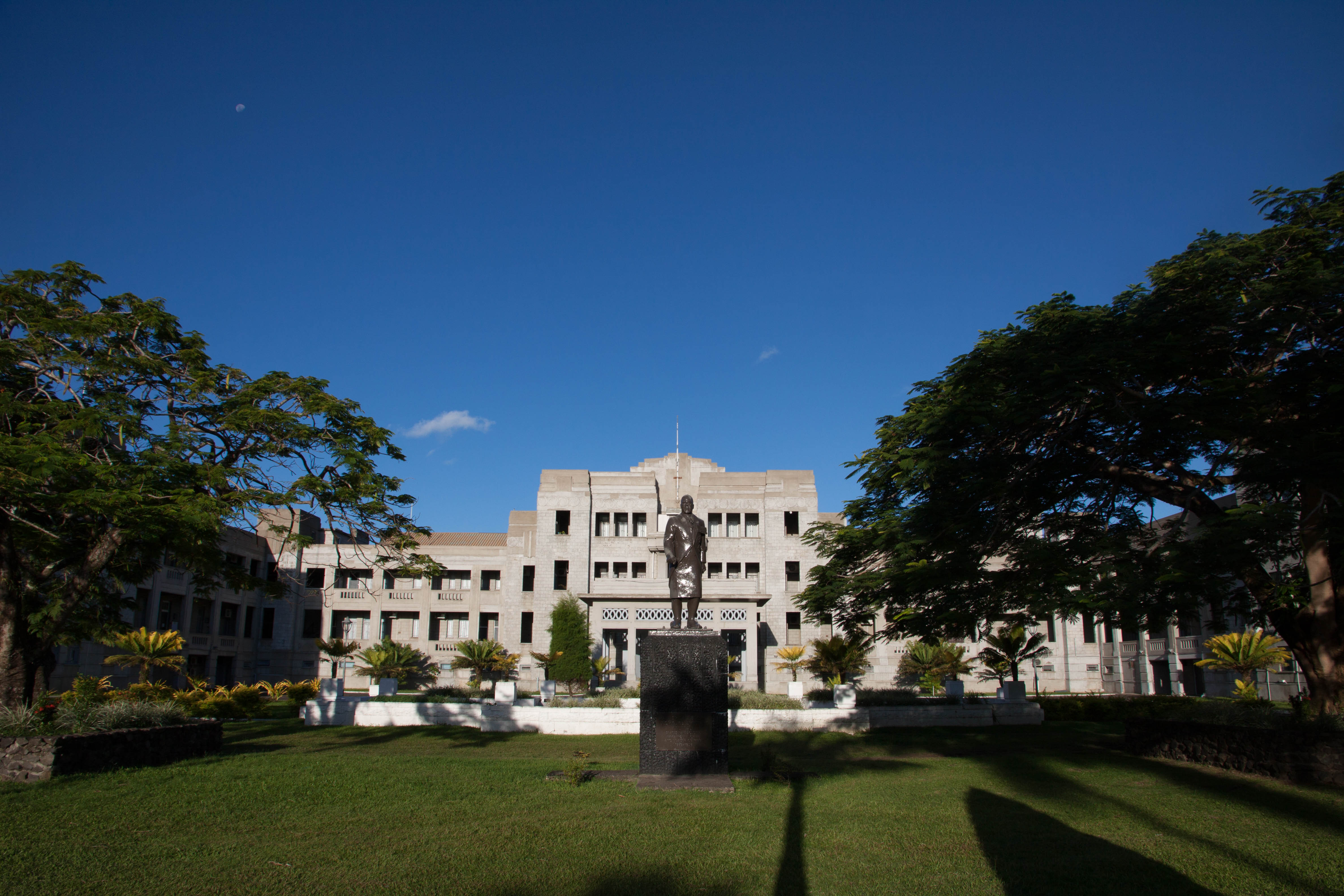
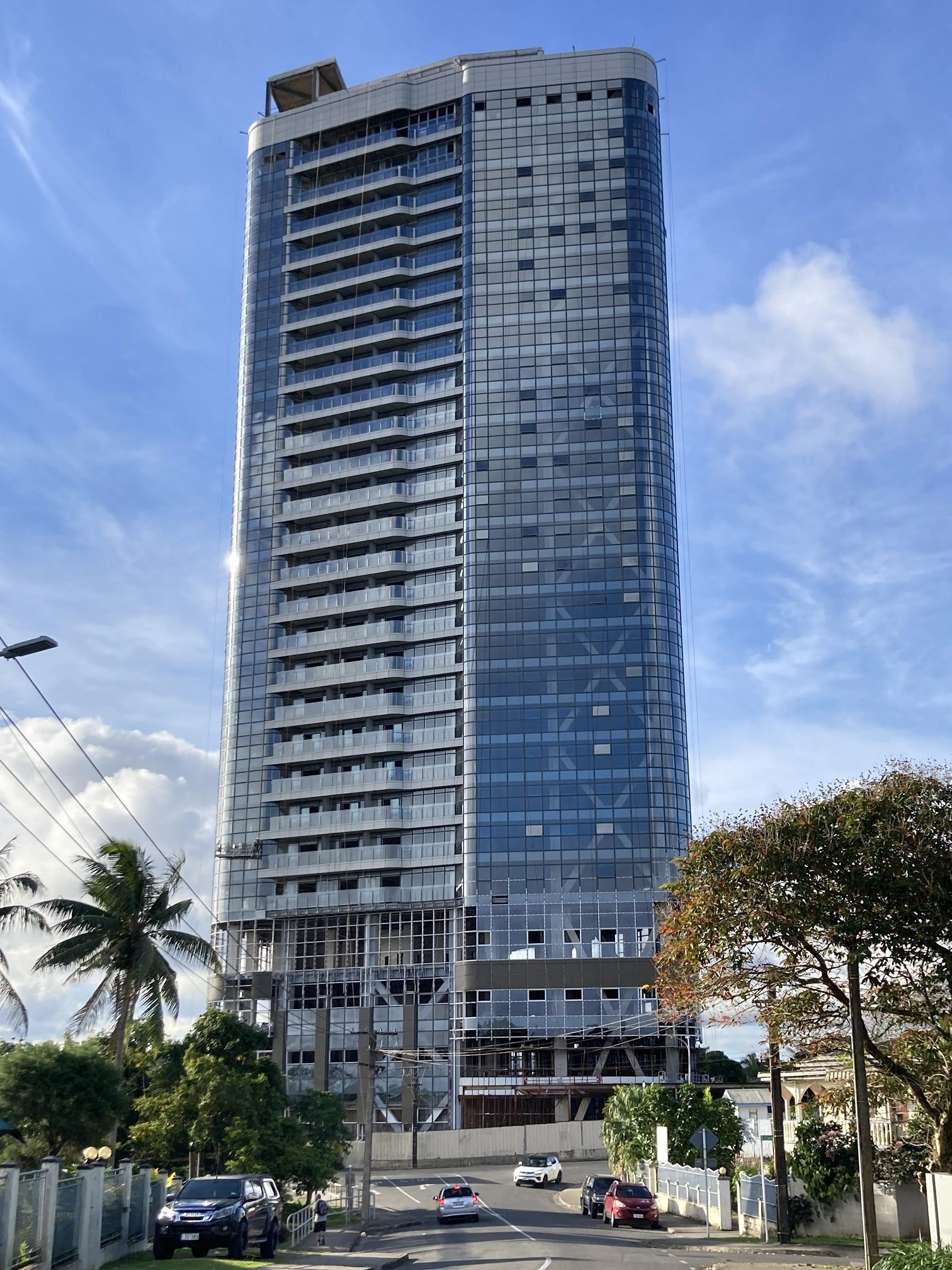
- Harbour Centre shopping mall Old Parliament Complex Suva Harbour Government Buildings WG Friendship Plaza Suva

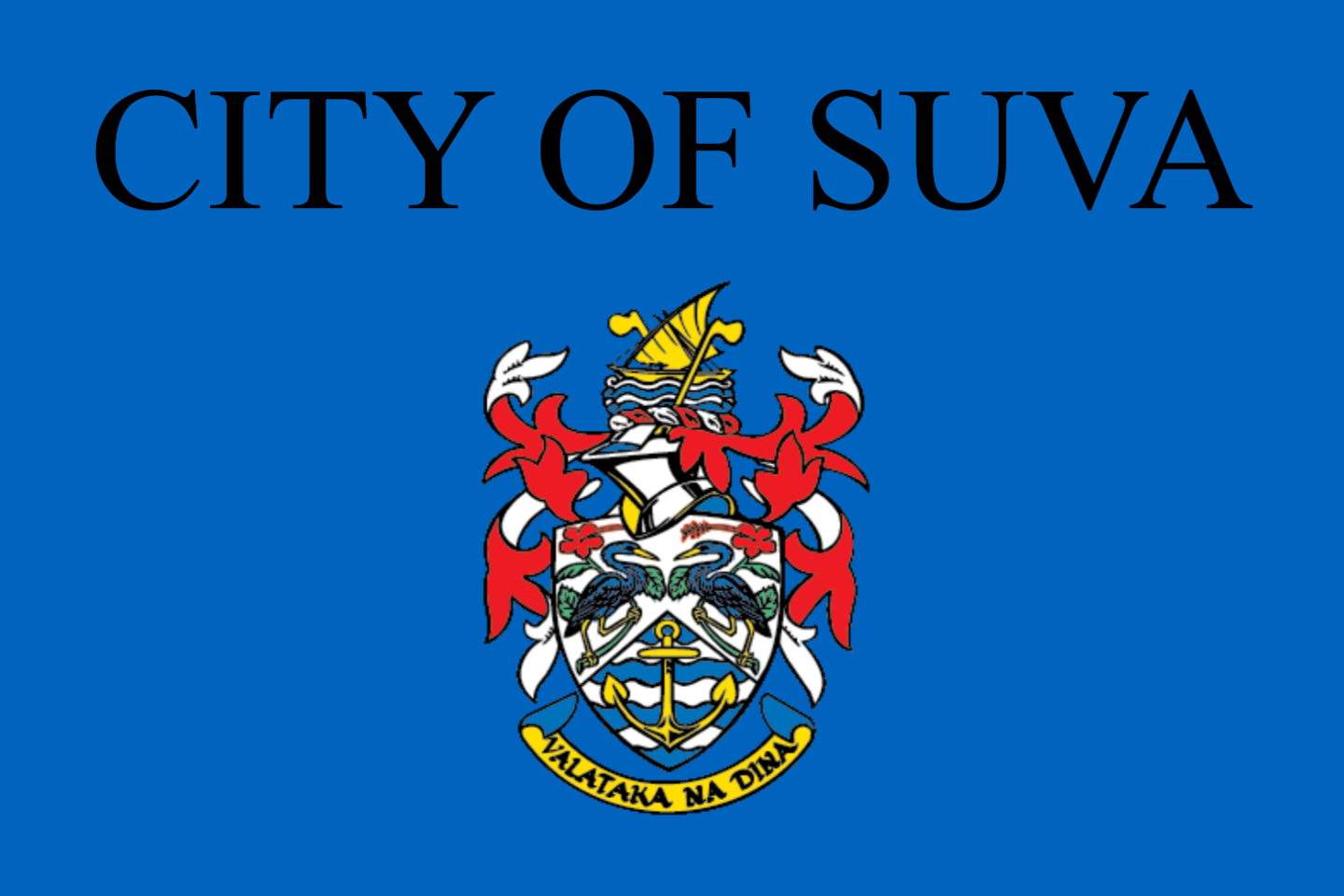
- Flag Coat of arms
- Motto: Valataka na Dina (Fight for the Right)
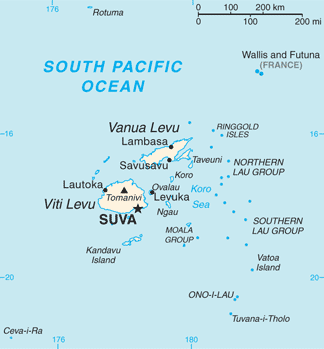
- Suva within Fiji
- Country: Fiji
- Division: Central Division
- Province: Rewa
- District: Suva

Government
  - Type: Suva City Council

Area
  - Capital city: 26.24 km^{2} (10.13 sq mi)

Population (2017 census)
  - Capital city: 93,874
  - Density: 3,578/km^{2} (9,266/sq mi)
  - Urban: 185,920
  - Metro: 268,423
- Time zone: UTC+12 (FJT)
- Website: suvacity.org

Suva (Fijian: [ˈsuβa] SOO-vuh, Fiji Hindi: सुवा) is the capital and most populous settlement of Fiji. It is the centre of Fiji's largest metropolitan area and serves as its major port. The city is on the southeast coast of the island of Viti Levu, in Rewa Province, Central Division.

In 1877, Fiji's capital was moved to Suva from Levuka, the main European colonial settlement at the time, due to the restrictive geography and environs of the latter. The administration of the colony was transferred from Levuka to Suva in 1882.

As of the 2017 census, Suva had a population of 93,874, The urban area which includes Nasinu had a population of 186,920. The metropolitan population of Suva including the towns of Lami, Nasinu, and Nausori was 268,423 (this urban complex, excluding Lami, is also known as the Suva-Nausori corridor).

Suva is Fiji's political, economic, and cultural centre. It is also the economic and cultural capital of the South Pacific, hosting most of the regional headquarters of major international corporations, international agencies, and diplomatic missions. The city also has a thriving arts and performance scene and a growing reputation as the region's fashion capital.

== History ==
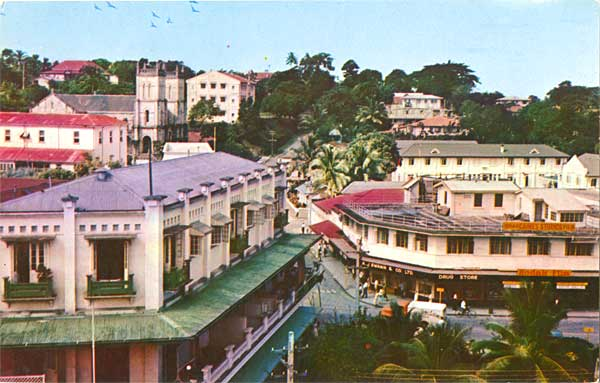
Suva Central Business District in the 1950s

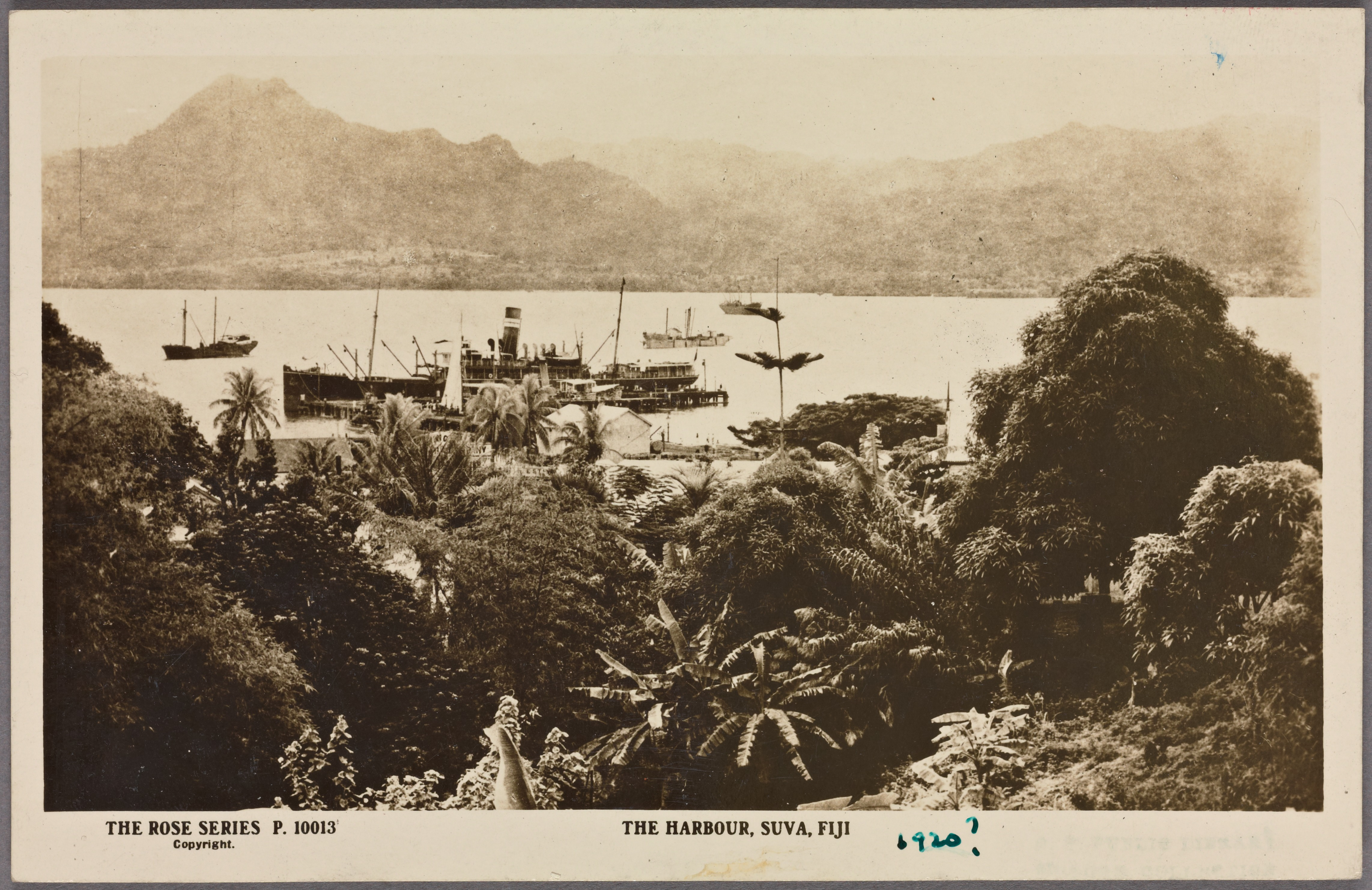
Suva, Fiji, c. 1920

In 1868, when Suva was still a small village, the Bauan chieftain, Seru Epenisa Cakobau, granted 5,000 km^{2} (1,900 sq mi) of land to the Australian-based Polynesia Company, in exchange for the company's promise to pay off debts owed to the United States. More than a tenth of this land area, 575 km^{2} (222 sq mi), was near Suva. The company's original intention was to develop a cotton farming industry, but the land and climate proved unsuitable.

In 1874, control of the Fiji Islands was ceded to the United Kingdom. In 1877, the colonial authorities moved the capital to Suva from Levuka, Ovalau, Lomaiviti, because Levuka's location between a steep mountain and the sea made any expansion of the town impractical. Colonel F. E. Pratt of the Royal Engineers was appointed Surveyor-General in 1875 and designed the new capital in Suva, assisted by W. Stephens and Colonel R. W. Stewart. The transfer of the administration to Suva was made official in 1882.

In 1910, Suva acquired the status of a municipality, under the Municipal Constitution Ordinance of 1909. Its area remained one square mile until 1952, when Suva annexed the Muanikau and Samabula wards, expanding its territory to 13 km^{2} (5.0 sq mi). In October of that year, Suva was officially designated a city – Fiji's first. Suva later annexed Tamavua. Most recently, Suva further extended its boundaries by incorporating the Cunningham area at its northern edge. Since then, urban sprawl has led to the growth of a number of suburbs outside the city limits. Together with the city, they form the metropolitan area known as the Greater Suva Area.

Suva hosted the South Pacific Games in 2003 for the third time in the event's 40-year history. In preparation for hosting the event, the Fijian government, with the help of a $16 million aid package from the People's Republic of China, funded the construction of a new gymnasium, indoor sports centre, swimming pool, stadium, field hockey pitch, and grandstands in the area around Suva.

== Geography and physical characteristics ==
In addition to being the capital of Fiji, Suva is also its commercial and political centre (though not necessarily its cultural centre), and its main port city. It has a mix of modern buildings and colonial-period architecture.

Suva is located around a harbour on a hilly peninsula in the southeast corner of Viti Levu Island, between Laucala Bay and Suva Harbour. The mountains to its north and west catch the southeast trade winds, producing year-round moist conditions.

Although Suva is on a peninsula, and almost surrounded by sea, its coast is lined with mangroves - the nearest beach is 40 kilometres (25 mi) away, at Pacific Harbour. A significant part of the city centre, including the Parliament buildings, is built on reclaimed mangrove swampland.

=== City wards ===
Below is a list of the city's five wards, beginning with the city centre, followed by the northwesternmost ward, and then in clockwise order:

1. Central: city centre; mostly commercial, central business district
2. Tamavua: urban; mostly residential
3. Extension: semi-urban; residential
4. Samabula: urban; residential, industrial, and commercial; has its own separate town centre; includes a university
5. Muanikau: urban; mostly industrial and residential; includes large sporting venues, a university, and recreational areas

== Climate ==
Suva

Climate chart (precipitation, max. and min. temperature)
J	F	M	A	M	J	J	A	S	O	N	D
315 31 24	286 31 24	371 31 24	391 29 23	267 28 22	164 28 21	142 27 20	159 27 21	184 27 21	234 28 22	264 29 23	263 30 23
- █ Average max. and min. temperatures in °C
- █ Precipitation totals in mm
- Source: WMO
Imperial conversion
J	F	M	A	M	J	J	A	S	O	N	D
12 87 75	11 88 75	15 87 74	15 84 73	11 83 72	6.5 82 71	5.6 80 69	6.3 80 69	7.2 81 70	9.2 82 71	10 84 73	10 86 74
- █ Average max. and min. temperatures in °F
- █ Precipitation totals in inches

Suva has a tropical rainforest climate, according to the Köppen climate classification system. But because of its trade winds and occasional cyclones, it is not an equatorial climate. The city sees a copious amount of precipitation throughout the year, with no true dry season; no month has an average rainfall below 60 mm (2 in). Suva averages 3,000 mm (118 inches) of precipitation annually. Its driest month, July, averages 125 mm (4.92 in). As in many other cities with a tropical rainforest climate, temperatures are relatively constant throughout the year, with an average high of about 28 °C (82 °F) and an average low of about 22 °C (72 °F).

Suva has markedly higher rainfall than Nadi or the western side of Viti Levu (known to Suva inhabitants as "the burning west"). The second governor of Fiji, Sir Arthur Gordon, is said to have remarked that he had never seen it rain anywhere the way it rains in Suva and that there was hardly a day without rain. The most copious rainfall is observed from November to May, while the slightly cooler months from June to October see considerably more moderate rainfall.

Climate data for Suva (Laucala Bay) (1991–2020 normals)
Month	Jan	Feb	Mar	Apr	May	Jun	Jul	Aug	Sep	Oct	Nov	Dec	Year
Mean daily maximum °C (°F)	31.1 (88.0)	31.5 (88.7)	31.4 (88.5)	30.3 (86.5)	28.9 (84.0)	27.9 (82.2)	27.1 (80.8)	27.0 (80.6)	27.5 (81.5)	28.5 (83.3)	29.6 (85.3)	30.5 (86.9)	29.3 (84.7)
Daily mean °C (°F)	27.9 (82.2)	28.1 (82.6)	28.0 (82.4)	27.2 (81.0)	25.9 (78.6)	25.0 (77.0)	24.2 (75.6)	24.2 (75.6)	24.7 (76.5)	25.6 (78.1)	26.5 (79.7)	27.4 (81.3)	26.2 (79.2)
Mean daily minimum °C (°F)	24.6 (76.3)	24.6 (76.3)	24.6 (76.3)	24.0 (75.2)	22.9 (73.2)	22.1 (71.8)	21.3 (70.3)	21.4 (70.5)	21.8 (71.2)	22.7 (72.9)	23.4 (74.1)	24.2 (75.6)	23.1 (73.6)
Average precipitation mm (inches)	342.9 (13.50)	275.9 (10.86)	339.7 (13.37)	335.3 (13.20)	232.9 (9.17)	156.3 (6.15)	136.3 (5.37)	144.4 (5.69)	188.3 (7.41)	248.2 (9.77)	247.2 (9.73)	344.3 (13.56)	2,991.7 (117.78)
Average precipitation days (≥ 1.0 mm)	18.7	17.0	19.5	18.1	15.4	13.3	12.7	12.8	12.9	14.5	14.9	18.0	187.8
Mean monthly sunshine hours	186.7	178.5	179.7	151.3	151.0	133.0	134.6	137.2	127.8	154.7	162.3	180.0	1,876.8
Source: World Meteorological Organization

Climate data for Suva (Nausori International Airport, 1991–2020 normals)
Month	Jan	Feb	Mar	Apr	May	Jun	Jul	Aug	Sep	Oct	Nov	Dec	Year
Record high °C (°F)	35.0 (95.0)	36.0 (96.8)	37.0 (98.6)	34.0 (93.2)	34.0 (93.2)	32.0 (89.6)	32.0 (89.6)	32.0 (89.6)	32.0 (89.6)	34.0 (93.2)	34.0 (93.2)	36.0 (96.8)	37.0 (98.6)
Mean daily maximum °C (°F)	30.6 (87.1)	31.0 (87.8)	30.9 (87.6)	29.8 (85.6)	28.3 (82.9)	27.4 (81.3)	26.6 (79.9)	26.4 (79.5)	26.9 (80.4)	27.8 (82.0)	29.0 (84.2)	29.9 (85.8)	28.7 (83.7)
Daily mean °C (°F)	27.0 (80.6)	27.3 (81.1)	27.2 (81.0)	26.4 (79.5)	24.9 (76.8)	24.1 (75.4)	23.3 (73.9)	23.2 (73.8)	23.7 (74.7)	24.5 (76.1)	25.6 (78.1)	26.5 (79.7)	25.3 (77.5)
Mean daily minimum °C (°F)	23.4 (74.1)	23.5 (74.3)	23.5 (74.3)	22.9 (73.2)	21.4 (70.5)	20.7 (69.3)	19.9 (67.8)	19.9 (67.8)	20.5 (68.9)	21.2 (70.2)	22.1 (71.8)	22.9 (73.2)	21.8 (71.2)
Average precipitation mm (inches)	353.7 (13.93)	291.5 (11.48)	351.3 (13.83)	307.6 (12.11)	213.4 (8.40)	160.6 (6.32)	131.3 (5.17)	141.2 (5.56)	173.4 (6.83)	241.4 (9.50)	239.0 (9.41)	336.0 (13.23)	2,940.4 (115.76)
Average precipitation days (≥ 1.0 mm)	19.2	17.6	19.3	17.7	15.5	13.4	12.0	12.7	12.6	14.6	14.7	18.2	187.5
Source 1: World Meteorological Organization
Source 2:

== Demographics ==
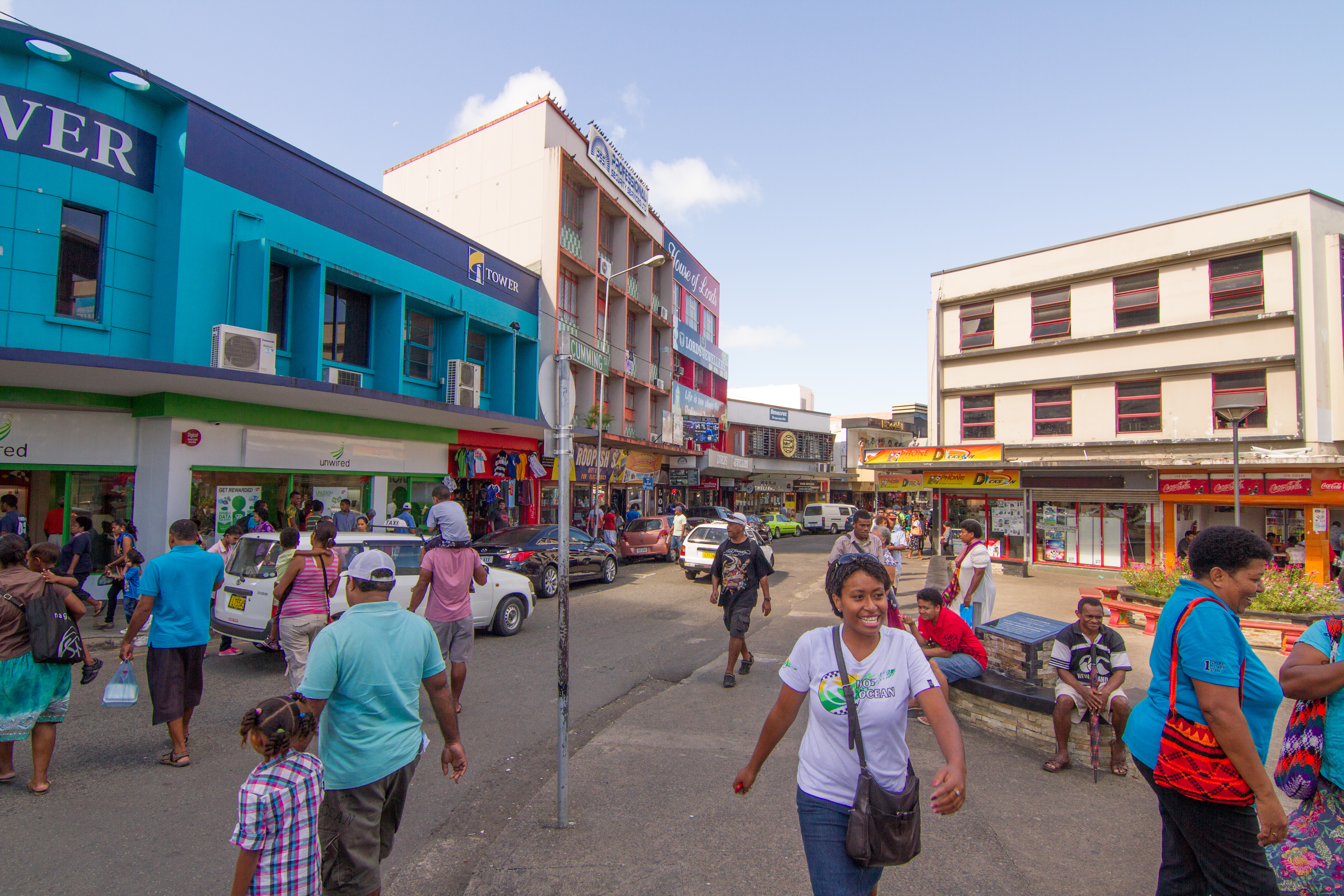
People in Suva

Suva is a multiracial and multicultural city. Indigenous Fijians and Indo-Fijians, Fiji's two principal ethnic groups, comprise the bulk of Suva's population, and the city is home to most of Fiji's ethnic minority populations, including Rotumans, Lauans, Rambians, Europeans (known as Kaivalagi), part-Europeans (of European and Fijian descent, known as “Kailoma") and Chinese. The most widely spoken language is English, but Fijian, Fiji Hindi, and other languages are also spoken by their respective communities.

Suva's inhabitants are representative of all the major indigenous Pacific groups: Suva is sometimes called the "New York of the Pacific". The city has a reputation as a major economic centre in the region and is the site of University of the South Pacific's main campus. This has led to an influx of Pacific migrants, who study, work, and live in Suva and its boroughs.

	1986	1996	2007	2017
Suva City	141,273	167,975	85,691	93,970
Official figures from population censuses

== Municipal government ==
Suva has municipal status and until 2009 was governed by a lord mayor and a 20-member city council. The Suva City Council was the municipal law-making body of the city of Suva. It consisted of 20 councillors, elected for three-year terms from four multi-member constituencies, called wards. Councillors were elected by residents, landowners, and representatives of corporations owning or occupying taxable property in Suva. Councillors in turn elected, from among their own members, a lord mayor and deputy lord mayor, who served one-year terms and were eligible for reelection.

In 2009, the military-backed interim Fijian government dismissed all municipal government officials and appointed special administrators to run the urban areas. As of 2015, elected municipal government had not been restored. The special administrator of Suva, along with nearby Nasinu, is Chandu Umaria, a former lord mayor of Suva.

== Landmarks ==
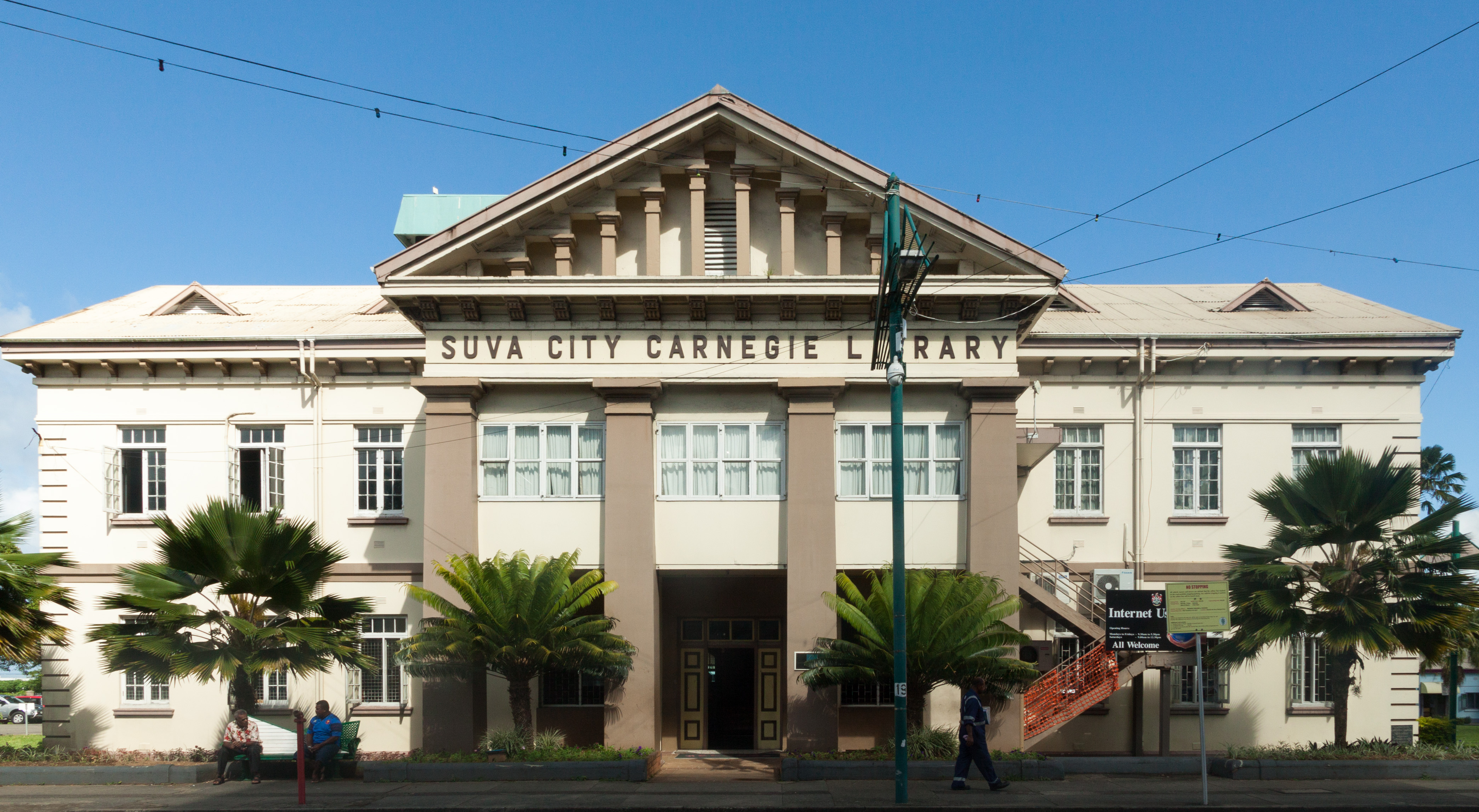
Suva City Carnegie Library

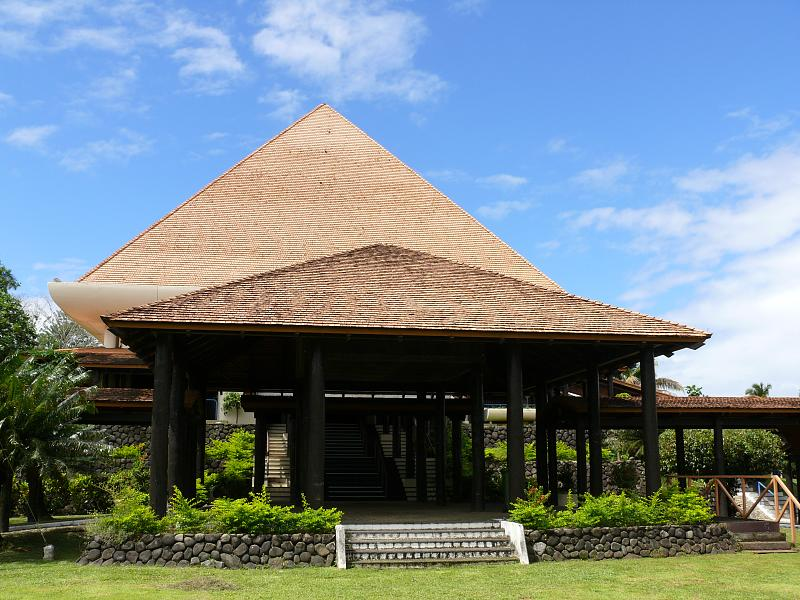
Parliament House

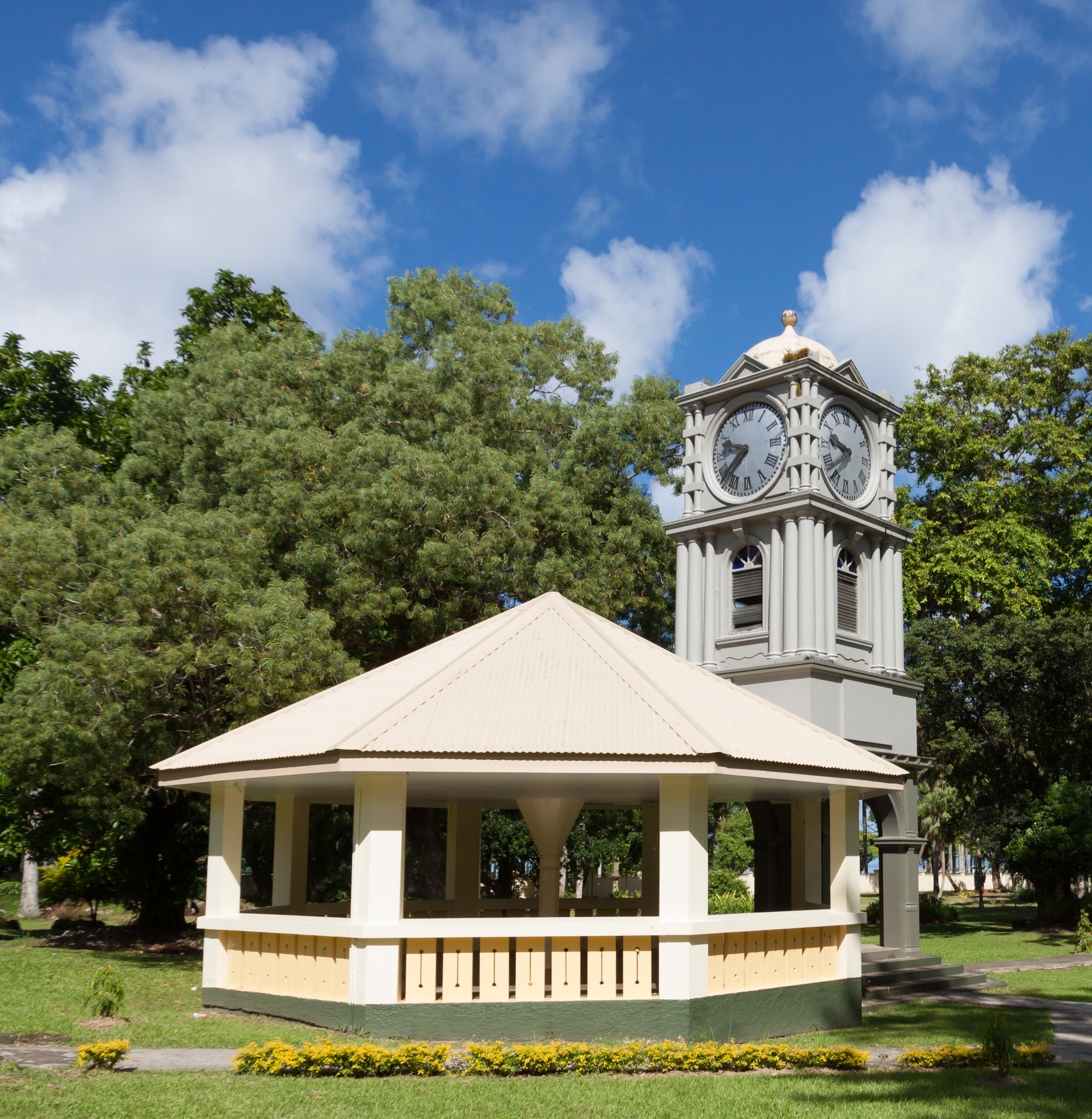
Thurston Gardens, Suva

A well-known landmark is the Suva City Carnegie Library, which was built in 1909. It is one of many colonial-period buildings in the city.

Another landmark is Suva's governmental building complex. It sits on what was once the flowing waters of a creek. In 1935, the creek was drained, and the complex's foundations were created by driving more than five kilometres of reinforced concrete pilings into its bed. The foundation stone was laid in 1937, the building complex was completed in 1939, and a new wing was completed in 1967. In 1992, the seat of the Parliament of Fiji was moved out of that complex and into a new one on Ratu Sukuna Road.

Government House was formerly the residence of Fiji's colonial governors and, after Fijian independence in 1970, governors-general. Today, it is the official residence of Fiji's president. The original house on the site was built in 1882, but a fire caused by lightning destroyed it in 1921. It was rebuilt in 1928.

The Suva campus of the University of the South Pacific (USP) occupies what was originally RNZAF Station Laucala Bay, home to the New Zealand No. 5 Squadron RNZAF. It is the largest of the many USP campuses throughout the South Pacific. USP is the largest university in the Pacific Islands outside Hawaii, and its courses are internationally recognised and endorsed.

The Fiji Museum, now in Thurston Gardens, was founded in 1904, and originally occupied the old town hall. It moved to its present location in 1954. The museum houses the world's most extensive collection of Fijian artifacts, and is also a research and educational institution, specialising in archaeology, the preservation of Fiji's oral tradition, and the publication of material on Fiji's language and culture.

Suva has about 78 parks. The new Takashi Suzuki Garden, in Apted Park at Suva Point, is a popular spot for viewing sunrise and sunset. Thurston Gardens, which opened in 1913, features flora from throughout the South Pacific.

Suva has many shopping and retail areas, notably Cumming Street, which has been a vibrant and colourful shopping area since colonial times. The Cumming Street area has original colonial buildings and narrow roads. Suva also has modern shopping malls, such as the Suva Central Shopping Mall, the Mid-City Mall, and MHCC.

One of Fiji's shopping malls, TappooCity, is the South Pacific's largest mall outside Australia and New Zealand. This low-rise (six-storey) building was constructed in 2009 in a joint venture by FNPF and the Tappoo Group of Companies. It is valued at US$25.7 million (FJD50 million).

Construction work began in 2011 on a FJD30-million mini-mall complex at Grantham Road, behind the Sports-City Complex and close to the Suva campus of the University of the South Pacific. It was scheduled to be completed in 2012, and to house restaurants, retail outlets, and cinemas.

== Economy ==
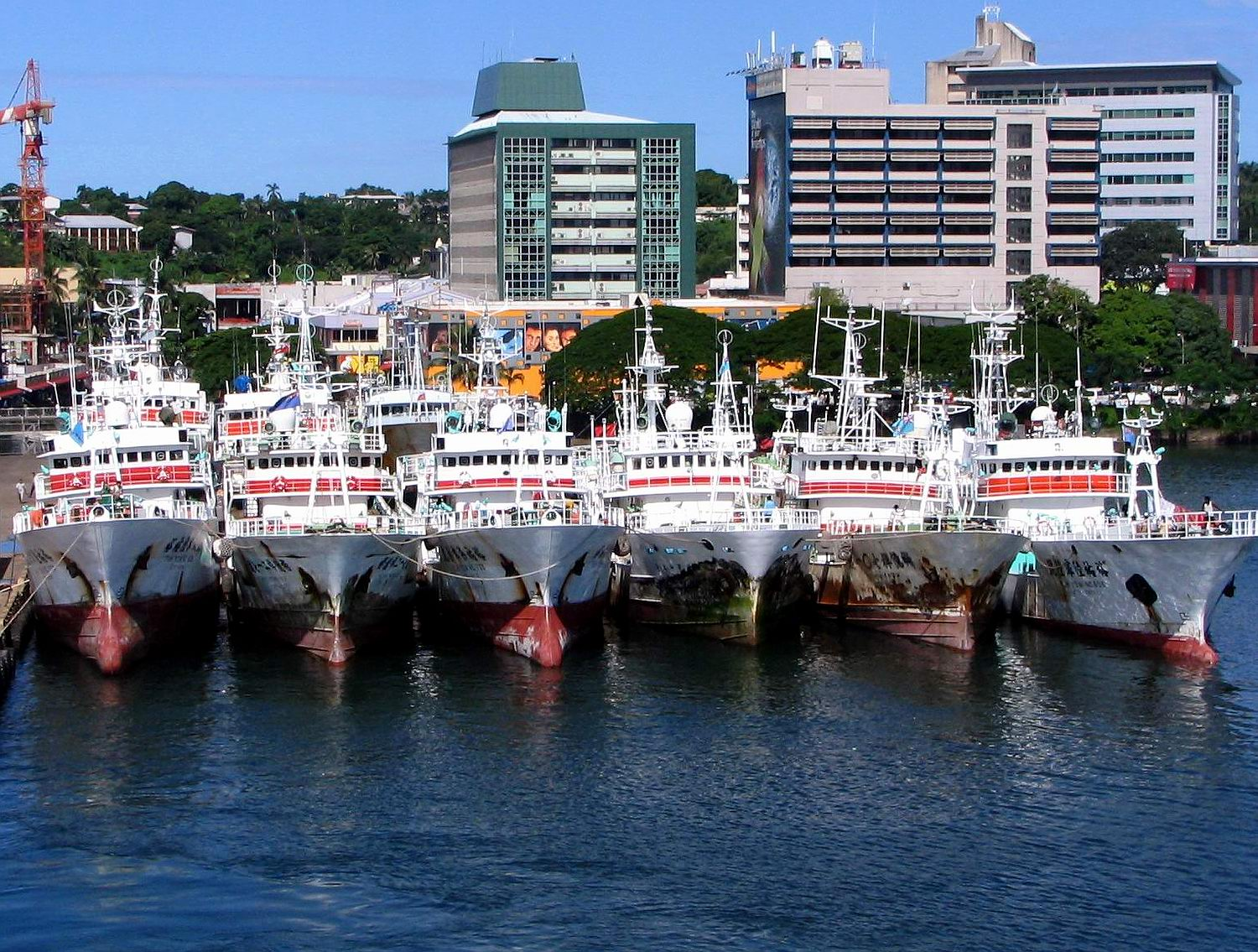
Suva Harbor

Suva did not grow up around a single industry. It has gradually developed to become the largest and most sophisticated city in the Pacific Islands, and a regional hub. Fijians of Indian descent have largely shaped its economy. Suva is the commercial center of Fiji: most international banks have their Pacific headquarters here, including ANZ and the Westpac. In addition, most Fijian financial institutions, non-governmental organisations, and government ministries and departments are headquartered here. At one point, both Air Pacific (now Fiji Airways) and Air Fiji were headquartered in Suva.

A large part of Fiji's international shipping, as well as the docking of international cruise ships, takes place at Suva's Kings Wharf. This has led to the growth of Suva's tourism industry.

The largest of Suva's several industrial areas is Walu Bay, which is home to factories, warehouses, import-export companies, shipyards, container yards, a brewery, and many printeries. Other notable industrial areas are Vatuwaqa, Raiwaqa, and Laucala Beach.

Among the most popular areas for shopping and commerce are Cumming Street and Victoria Parade.

== Institutions ==
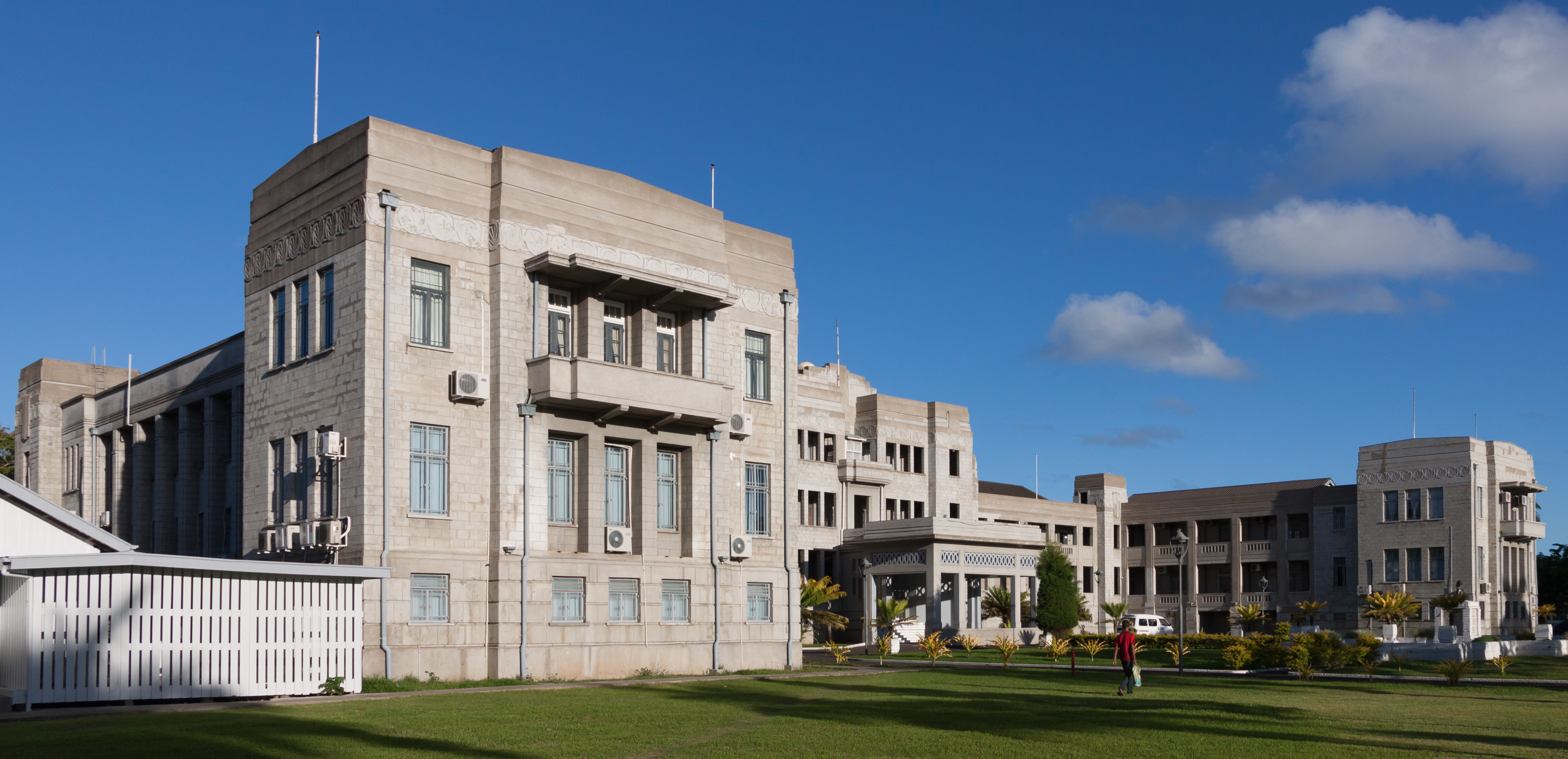
Government Buildings, Suva CBD

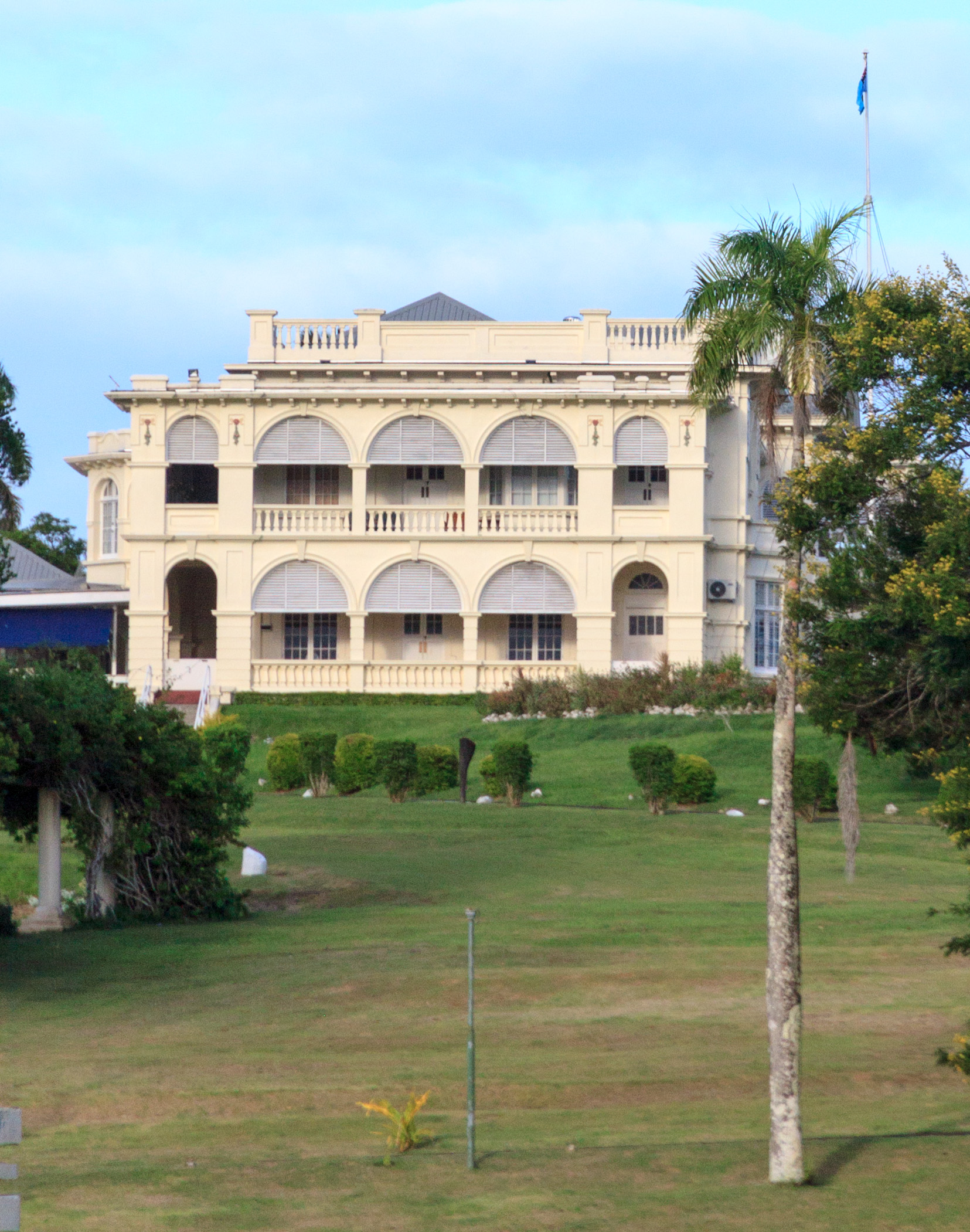
Government House – The Presidential Residence

Suva is host to more international and regional intergovernmental agencies and NGOs than any other Pacific Island capital. Some of the bodies with a presence in Suva are:

- The TRAFFIC Oceania South Pacific Programme – funded by the UK Foreign and Commonwealth Office, is in Suva, in the offices of the WWF South Pacific Programme. The programme assists in the implementation of CITES and strengthens collaboration with the World Wide Fund for Nature.
- The Fiji School of Medicine – which is now classed as a regional agency and a member of the Council of Regional Organisations in the Pacific.
- The University of Fiji.
- The Fiji School of Nursing.
- The University of the South Pacific which operates a campus in Suva as well as at other South Pacific locations.
- The Fiji National University which is a major polytechnic in Fiji and caters to students from many small Pacific Island nations. It has centres in other Fiji towns of Nadi, Ba and Labasa.
- The Fiji College of Advanced Learning.
- TPAF (The Training and Productivity Authority of Fiji).
- The Pacific Community (SPC).
- The Pacific Islands Forum Secretariat.
- The South Pacific Applied Geoscience Commission (SOPAC).
- St John's Theological College, Cawaci.
- The Pacific Regional Seminary (PRS).
- The Pacific Theological College (PTC).
- Femmus School of Hospitality.
- Yat Sen School.
- Alliance Française.
- Greenpeace Pacific.
- UNDP Headquarters (Papua New Guinea, Vanuatu, Fiji, Tonga, Samoa, Cook Islands, Palau, Micronesia, Marshall Islands, Tuvalu, Kiribati, Niue, Nauru).
- Asian Development Bank Headquarters Pacific
- World Bank Headquarters

== Entertainment and culture ==
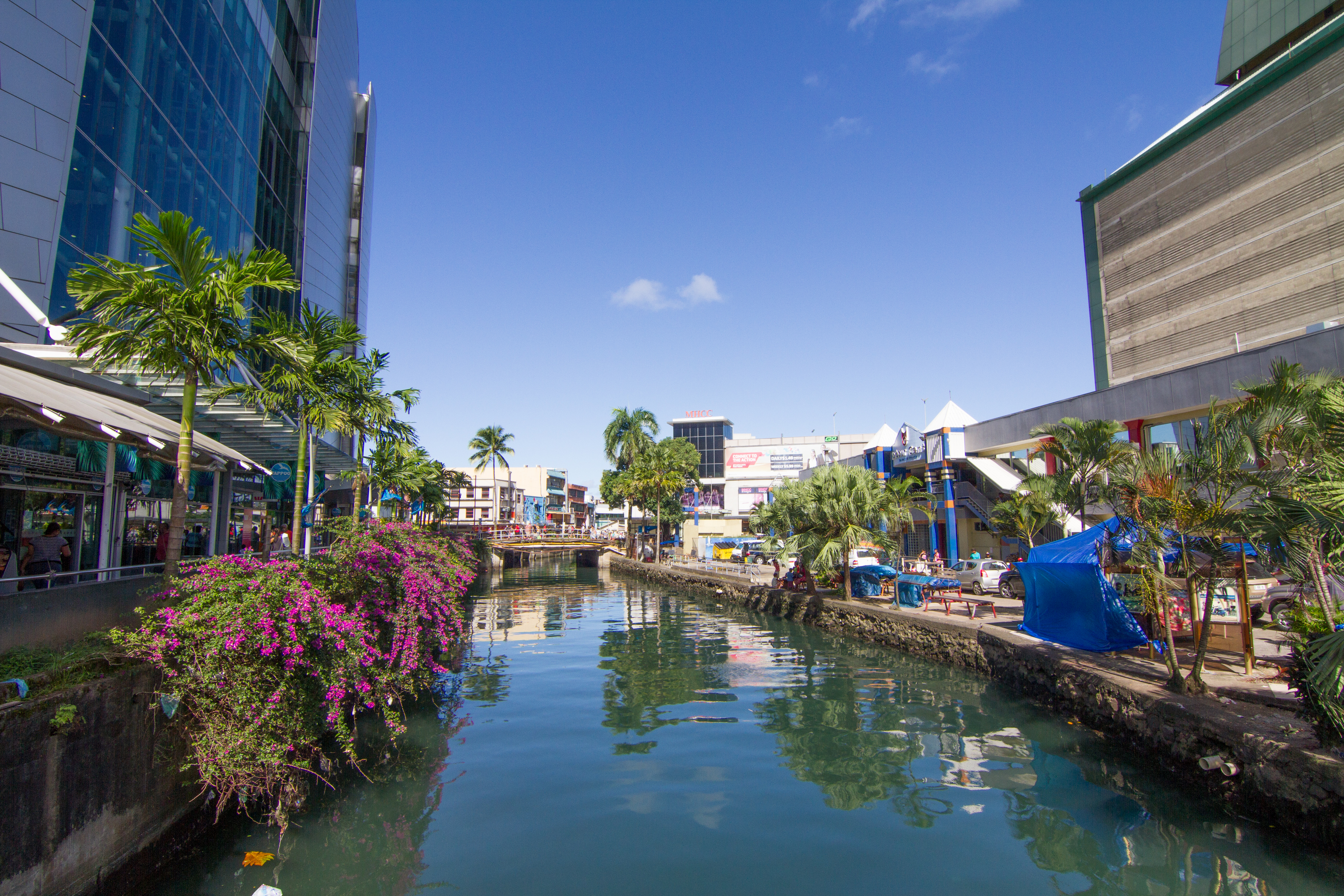
Canal and shopping area

Suva hosts numerous regional, national, and local events annually, supported by a variety of multipurpose venues and community facilities.

=== Venues ===
Suva has many multipurpose venues, the main ones being the Vodafone Arena, which can seat up to 5,000 people, the HFC Bank Stadium, which can seat 15,446 people, the FMF National Gymnasium Suva, which can seat up to 2,000 people, and the Civic Auditorium, which can seat up to 1,000 people.

=== Parks and gardens ===
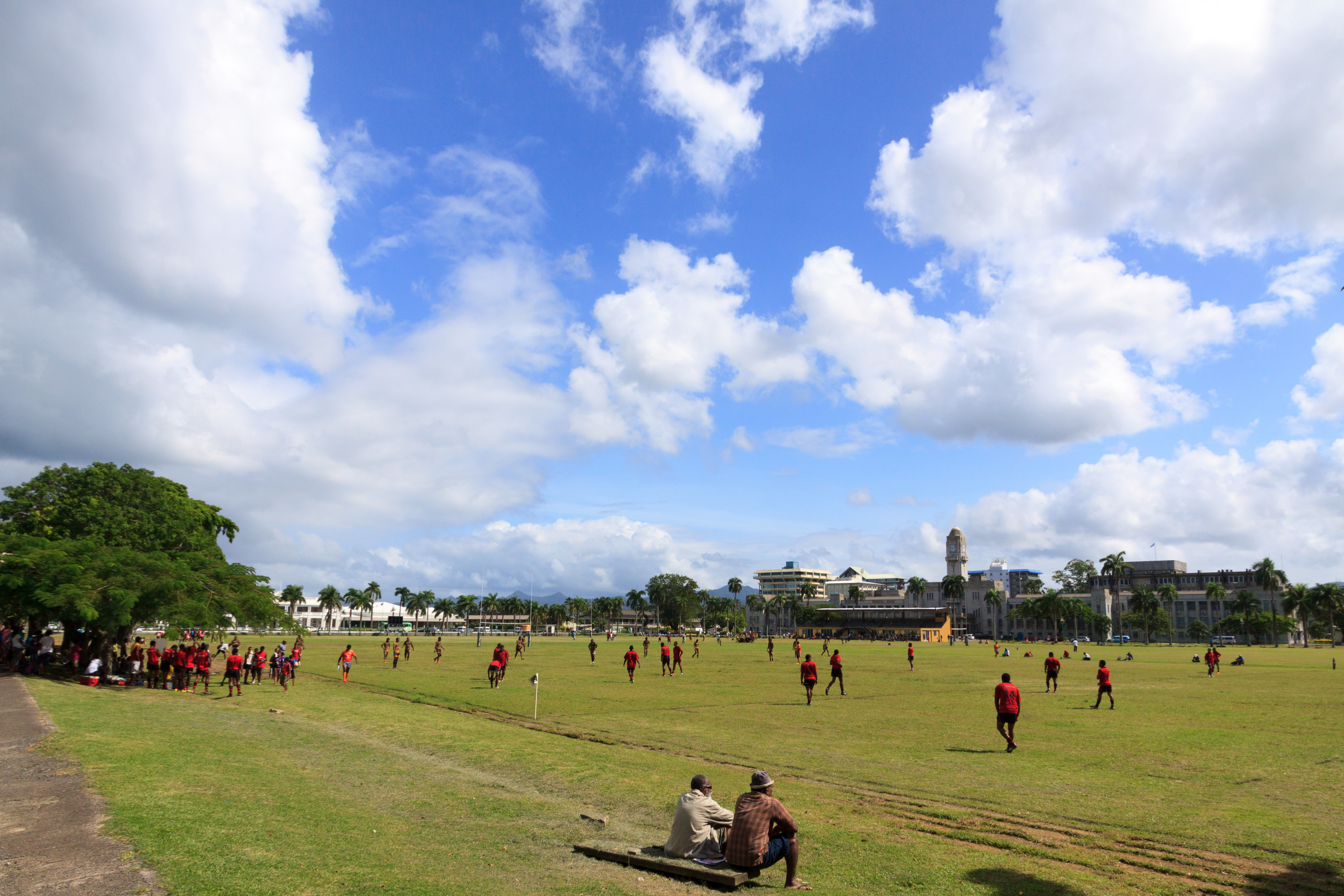
Albert Park

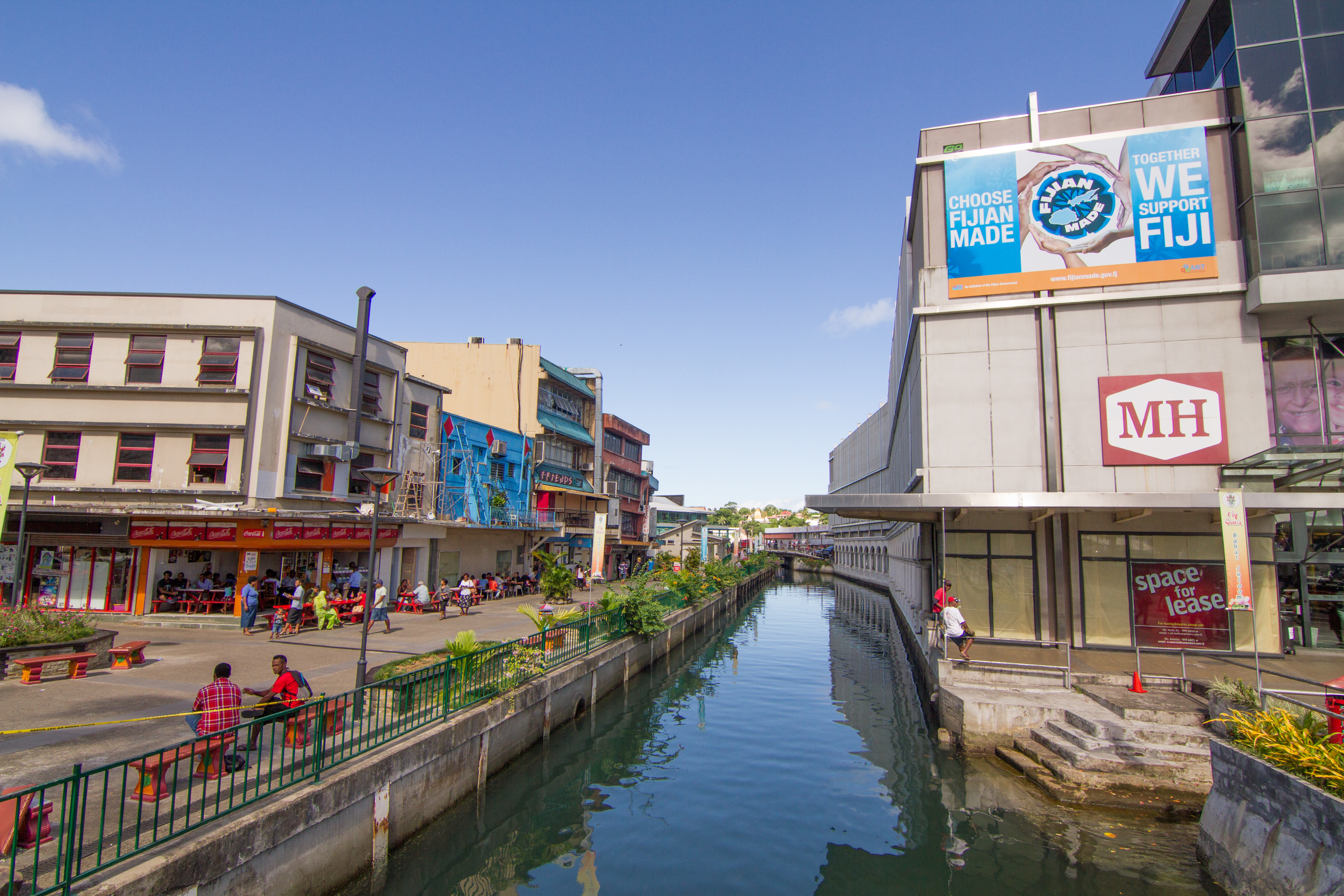
Canal in the city centre

Suva has a number of parks and a few gardens. Albert Park, in the City centre, is famous as the stage for many national-historical events such as the Independence of Fiji, the landing by Kingsford Smith on the Southern Cross and many parades and carnivals. Sukuna Park, also in the CBD is a popular recreational park and has many performances and events on a weekly basis. Thurston Gardens (named for Governor of Fiji John Bates Thurston) is the city's main botanical garden and the location of the Fiji Museum. Queen Elizabeth Drive is popular as a scenic walk along Suva's foreshore. Many city residents go to the Colo-i-Suva Forest Reserve, a short drive from the city centre, to swim under the waterfalls.

=== Music ===
Many concerts are held in Suva, some coming from other countries to enjoy world-class performances. Concerts and shows are usually staged at one of the above-mentioned venues on a monthly basis. Some of the famous music artists to hold shows in Suva include UB40, Lucky Dube, O'Yaba, Sean Kingston and many others. Due to a favoured interest in Bollywood by all, some prominent singers and actors have held shows in the capital which include singers like Shaan, Sonu Nigam, Sunidhi Chauhan and movie artists like Shah Rukh Khan, Priyanka Chopra, Johnny Lever, Dino Morea, Rajpal Yadav, Sunny Leone and the like.

=== Food ===
Owing to its multicultural demographics, Suva offers a variety of global cuisine. Particularly popular are Fijian, Indian, Chinese, American, and foods from other cultural and ethnic backgrounds. Fijians of Indian descent have influenced Fiji's cuisine, in the process creating the uniquely Fiji Indian curry. Indentured labourers brought with them spices, chilies, and other herbs and vegetables that are now part of the Fijian palate and cuisine.

=== Sports ===
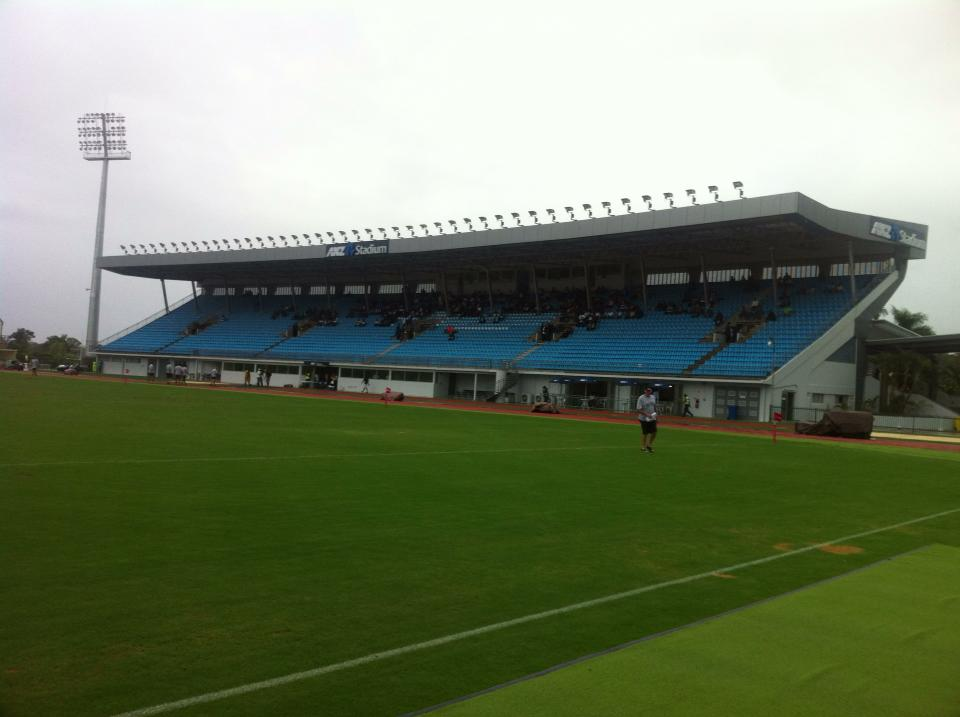
HFC Bank Stadium

Suva hosts many regional and national sporting events, most notably at the HFC Bank Stadium. A special highlight is the Coca-Cola Games, the world's largest secondary school athletics meet. The Capital City is represented in major sporting events by its rugby, netball, and football teams.

Suva hosted the first Pacific Games in 1963. In 2003 the Games returned to Suva with a full program of 32 sports introduced for the first time. Suva held the games for the second time in 1979. Suva has hosted the Pacific Games more often than any other city.

=== Mass media ===
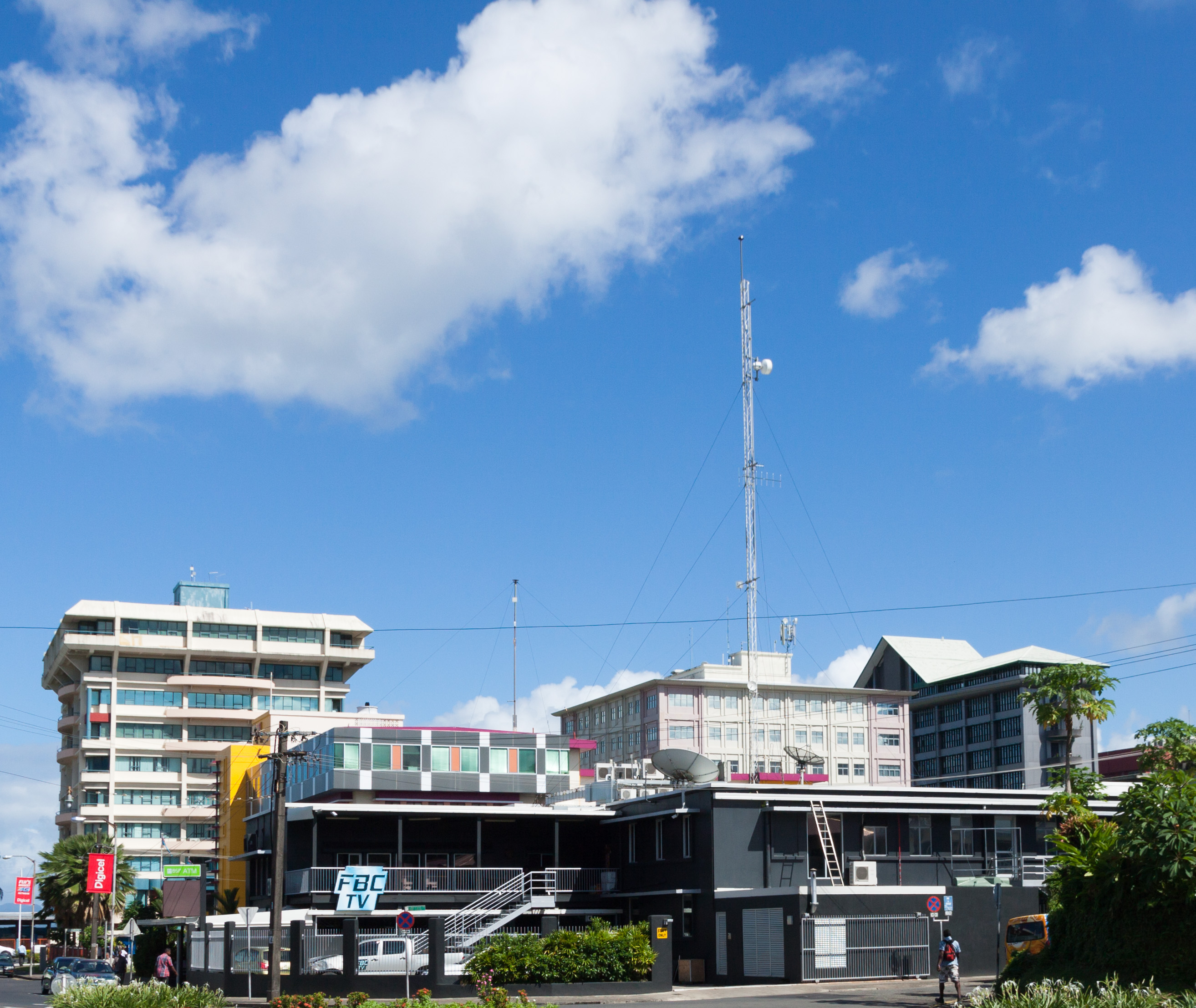
FBC TV building

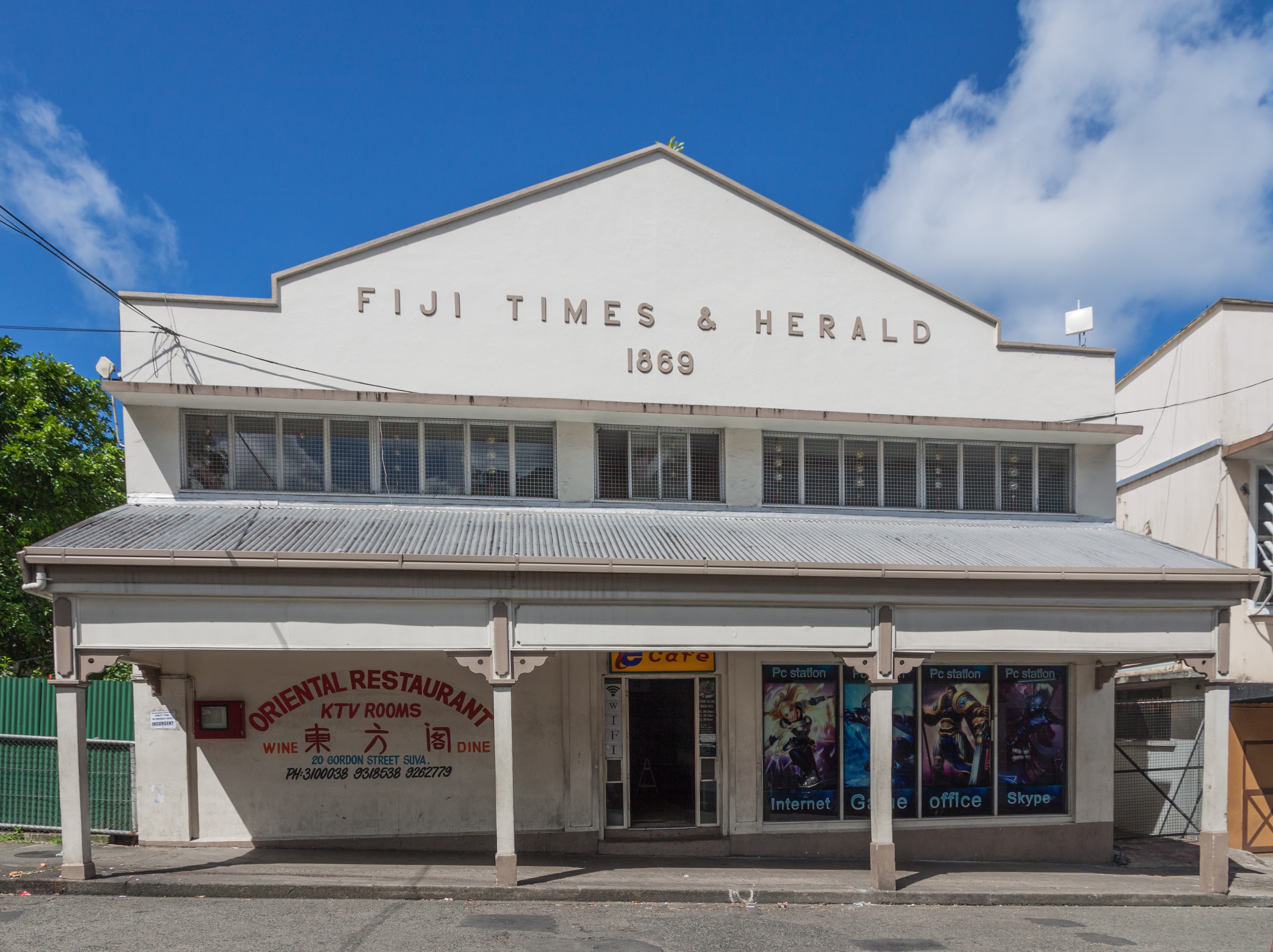
Fiji Times building

Headquartered in Suva are the Fiji's three main national television stations: Fiji One, FBC TV and MAI TV, alongside the Fiji Ministry of Information, the producer of government programming, national news, and current affairs bulletins. Fiji One produces and airs its evening 'National News' bulletin from its studios in Gladstone Road in Central; FBC TV airs its 'FBC News' bulletin from its studios, also on Gladstone Road. Sky Pacific and Pacific Broadcasting Services Fiji are the two pay satellite television company headquartered in Suva.

Suva is home to the national radio broadcasters Fijian Broadcasting Corporation (FBC) and Communications Fiji Limited (CFL), between them providing 12 national radio stations.

The two dailies, The Fiji Times and The Fiji Sun are printed here (and, formerly, the Fiji Post). Many other weekly newspapers are headquartered and published in Suva, including Inside Fiji, Nai Lalakai (iTaukei language weekly), Shanti Dut (Fiji Hindi weekly), national magazines such as Repúblika and Mai Life as well as regional magazines such as Islands Business.

=== Shopping and fashion ===
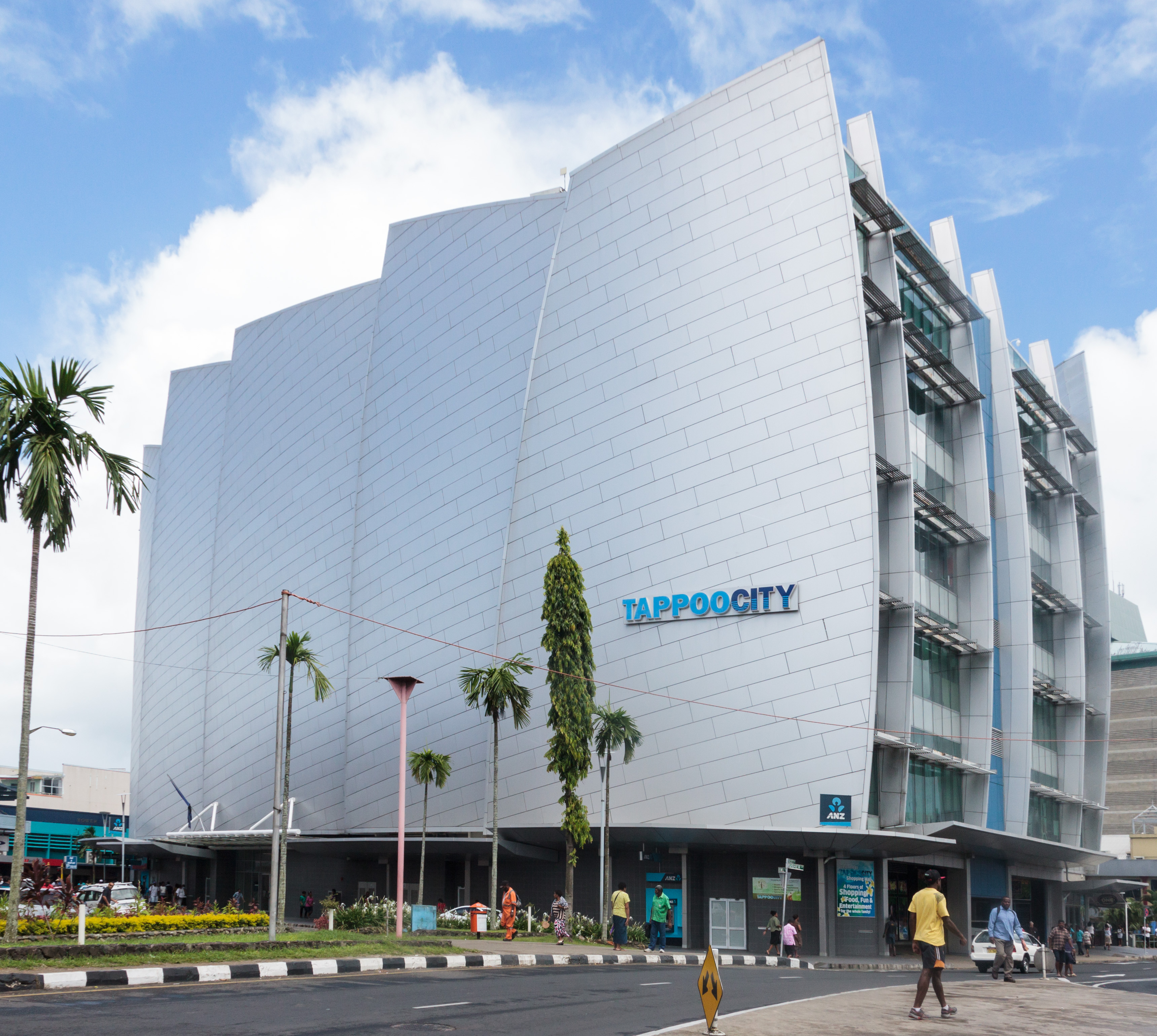
Tappoo City shopping centre

Suva is one of the most shopper-friendly cities in the Pacific. Its shops are clustered in an area known as Suva Central. Cumming Street and Marks Street sell clothing, jewellery, food, electronics, pharmaceuticals and more while Terry Walk and the Flea Market offer handicrafts and local wares. Nearby, large new shopping complexes dominate the canal area, such as MHCC (Morris Hedstrom City Center), Tappoo City and Suva Central. There are telecommunications and electronic stores, as well as sporting gear stores, in the outer areas of this area.

Suva also hosts the headquarters of the Fashion Council of Fiji, the region's most significant fashion organisation. The Fijian Fashion Festival, the region's largest trade and consumer fashion platform, occurs annually at the Grand Pacific Hotel in Suva.

== Transportation ==
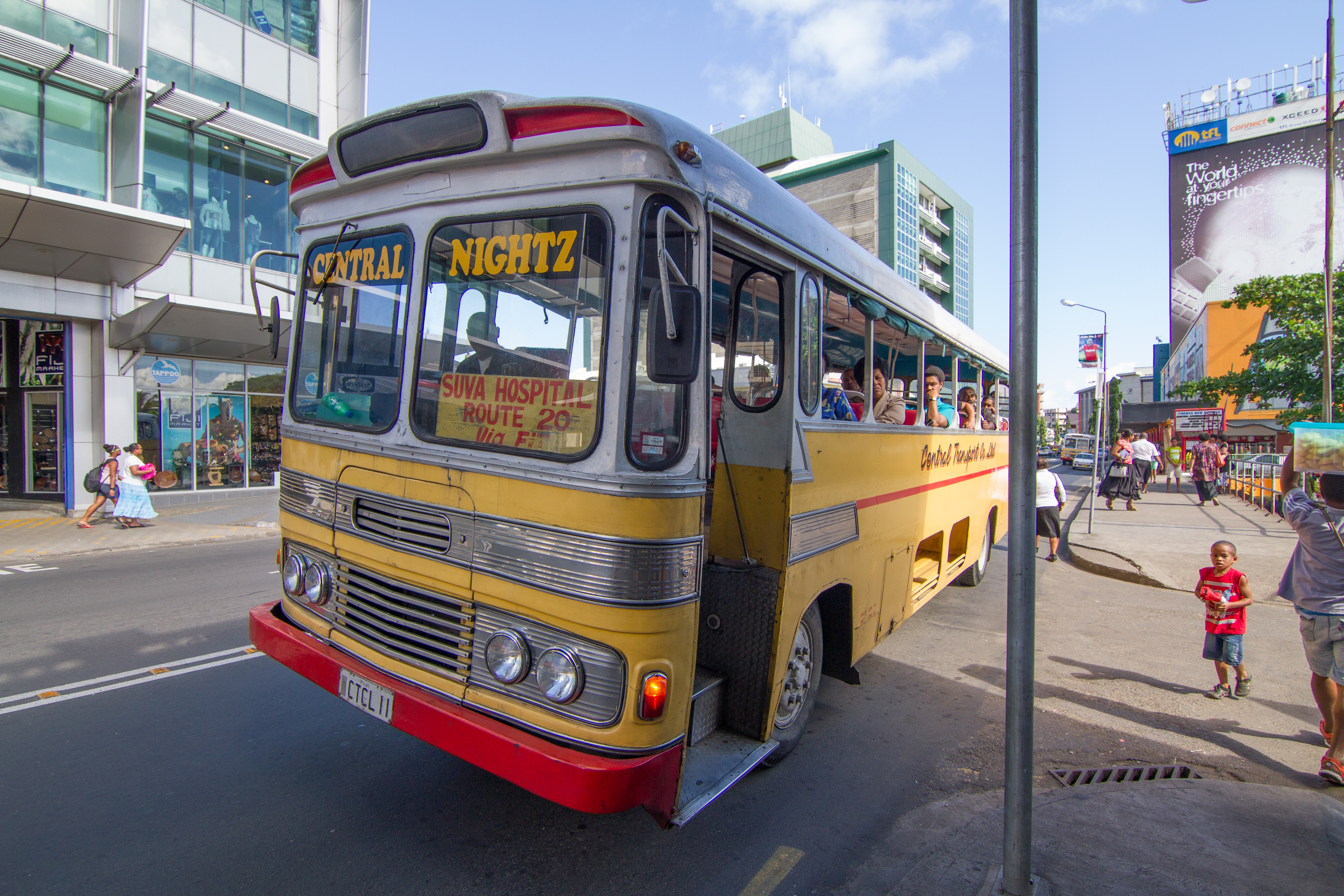
Bus Route 20

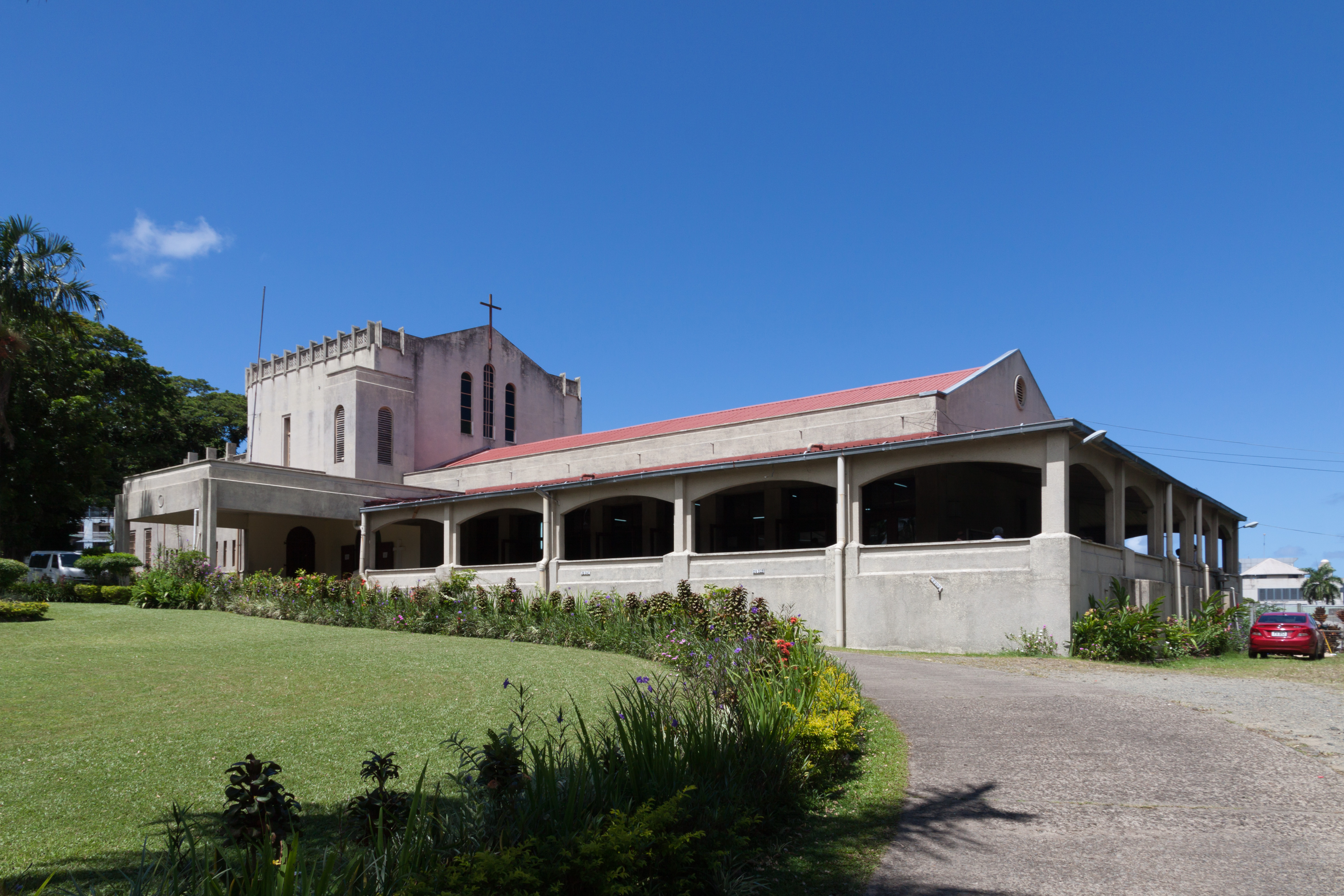
Holy Trinity Anglican Cathedral, Gordon Street, Suva

Nausori International Airport caters mainly to the domestic market, connecting Suva with Fiji's other international airport, Nadi International Airport.

Suva has a public transport system consisting of buses (Central Transport Co.) and taxis servicing the metropolitan area as well as the cities of Nasinu, Nausori, and Lami town. There are bus services connecting Suva with other towns and cities on Viti Levu by way of either the Kings, Queens, or Princes highways, all originating within Suva, although the latter terminates at Rewa Bridge in Nausori.

There is a domestic ferry service from the Princess Wharf to the outer islands of Fiji as well as Vanua Levu. International ships and cruise liners dock at Suva's Kings Wharf.

== Notable residents ==
This is a list of famous people who are either living in, or are originally from Suva.

- Petero Civoniceva (born in Suva), Australian rugby league player
- Noor Dean, a Fiji Indian lawyer and politician, Suva City Council, and House of Representatives
- Josua Koroibulu, plays rugby league for the Fiji national rugby league team
- Nalini Krishan, Star Wars film actress
- Craig Parker, New Zealand actor
- Paulini (born in Suva), Australian singer and songwriter
- Don Dunstan, Premier of South Australia 1967 - 1968 and 1970 - 1979
- Semi Radradra, Parramatta Eels player and plays for the Fiji national rugby league team
- Waisale Serevi, Fiji Rugby Team
- Devanesh Sharma, leading Suva lawyer and former President of the Fiji Law Society
- Jimmy Snuka, professional wrestler between 1968 and 2015
- Sitiveni Sivivatu, All Black Chiefs (Super rugby franchise)
- Semi Tadulala, plays rugby union for Gloucester Rugby in England and Fiji in rugby union previously a professional rugby league footballer for Melbourne Storm, Bradford Bulls and the Fiji national rugby league team
- Lote Tuqiri, played rugby union for the Australian national rugby union team
- Tarisi Vunidilo, Fijian archaeologist and curator
- Marques Whippy, professional basketball player
- Veniana Tuibulia, bronze medalist in the 2003 Oceania Judo Championship in the -52 kg category

== Twin towns – sister cities ==
Suva is twinned with:

- Beihai, China
- Brighton, Australia
- Guangdong, China
- Frankston, Australia
- Port Moresby, Papua New Guinea
- Shaoxing, China
- Yongsan, Seoul, South Korea
- Virac, Catanduanes, Philippines

== See also ==
- 1953 Suva earthquake
