= 2020 in Fiji =

- Decades: 2000s; 2010s; 2020s
- See also: Other events of 2020; Timeline of Fijian history

Events of 2020 in Fiji.

== Incumbent ==
=== Government of Fiji ===
- President: George Konrote
- Prime Minister: Frank Bainimarama
- Speaker: Epeli Nailatikau

=== Cabinet of Fiji ===
| Party key | FijiFirst |

Cabinet of Fiji: November 2018 – present
| Portrait | Portfolio | Incumbent |
|---|---|---|
| | Prime Minister; Minister for iTaukei Affairs; Minister for Sugar; Sugar Industry; Foreign Affairs; Forestry | Frank Bainimarama |
| | Attorney-General; Minister for Economy, Civil Service, Communications, Housing and Community Development | Aiyaz Sayed-Khaiyum |
| | Minister for Education, Heritage and Arts | Premila Kumar |
| | Minister for Rural, Maritime Development and Disaster Management and Minister for Defence, National Security and Policing | Inia Seruiratu |
| | Minister for Fisheries | Semi Koroilavesau |
| | Minister for Employment, Productivity and Industrial Relations and Youth and Sports | Parveen Bala |
| | Minister for Women, Children and Poverty Alleviation | Rosy Akbar |
| | Minister for Agriculture, Waterways and Environment | Mahendra Reddy |
| | Minister for Health and Medical Services | Ifereimi Waqainabete |
| | Minister for Infrastructure and Meteorological Services and Minister for Lands and Mineral Resources | Jone Usamate |
| | Minister for Commerce, Trade, Tourism and Transport | Faiyaz Koya |
Assistant Ministers
| | Assistant Minister for Agriculture, Waterways and Environment | Viam Pillay |
| | Assistant Minister for Women, Children and Poverty Alleviation; Deputy Speaker of the House | Veena Bhatnagar |
| | Assistant Minister for Rural and Maritime Development and Disaster Management | Jale Sigarara |
| | Assistant Minister for Health and Medical Services | Alexander O'Connor |
| | Assistant Minister for Rural and Maritime Development and Disaster Management | Vijay Nath |
| | Assistant Minister for Employment, Productivity and Industrial Relations; Youth and Sports | Alvikh Maharaj |
| | Assistant Minister for Sugar Industry | George Vegnathan |
| | Assistant Minister for Employment, Productivity and Industrial Relations; Youth and Sports | Alipate Nagata |
| | Assistant Minister for Itaukei Affairs | Selai Adimaitoga |
Others
| | Speaker of the House | Epeli Nailatikau |
| | Leader of Opposition | Naiqama Lalabalavu |
| | Former president of the FijiFirst, now President of Fiji | Wiliame Katonivere |

== Ongoing events ==
- COVID-19 pandemic in Fiji

== Events by month ==
=== January ===
- Reserve Bank of Fiji anticipates Fiji's economy to grow by 1.7% in 2020.
- Drama precedes SODELPA court hearing at Civil High Court In Suva.
- Wuhan Coronavirus: Everything toned down says Fijian student in Wuhan.
- Poster boys of honesty badged as Nasinu Muslim College Prefects.
- International Social Security Association Pacific Desk Office opens.
- 81 Chinese nationals that arrived into Dravuni, Kadavu and Suva via cruise liner Majestic Princess were marked safe by health officials.

=== February ===
- Coca-Cola games begins with zone 1 kicking off.
- Missing eight at sea found, had no idea search and rescue was activated.
- Coronavirus may interrupt supply chains in Fiji.
- New Zealand Prime Minister Jacinda Arden state visit to Fiji.

=== March ===
- Fiji confirms its first case of COVID-19.
- Schools all over Fiji closed indefinitely till April 17.
- Attorney General and Minister for Economy Aiyaz Sayed-Khaiyum revealed the COVID-19 response budget.
- Prime Minister Frank Bainimarama announced a nationwide curfew from 8pm to 5am.
- Fiji National University extend its mid-semester break.
- Lautoka, Suva and part of Labasa under lockdown.
- Fiji records 5 cases at the end of March.

=== April ===
- 561 Fijians repatriated, 1157 visitors evacuated and 87,000 kg exports freighted by Fiji Airways.
- 21 tests conducted. Confirmed cases still at 16.
- Cyclone Harold hits Fiji. A 66-year-old man in Kadavu died.
- The Government of Australia pledged A$350,000 in aid to Fiji for Harold relief efforts.
- The High Commissioner of New Zealand to Fiji, Jonathan Curr, pledged humanitarian and disaster and relief for Fiji from New Zealand.
- At the end of April, Fiji recorded a total of 18 cases with 11 recovered.

=== May ===
- Fourteen patients have recovered from COVID-19.

=== December ===
- December 17 – Fiji imposes a curfew in anticipation of Cyclone Yasa, a Category 5 storm that is expected to make landfall on December 18.
- December 19 – At least four are killed and millions of dollars in damage as Hurricane Yasa slams into Vanua Levu. 16,113 people are unable to return to their homes.

== Predicted and scheduled events ==
- October 10 – Fiji Day
- October 29 – The Prophet's Birthday
- November 14 – Diwali
- December 25 – Christmas Day
- December 26 – Boxing Day

== Deaths ==
=== February ===
- February 3 – Josefa Rika, cricketer.
- February 26 – Satya Nandan, diplomat, former representative to the U.N. and former ambassador to the Netherlands.

=== April ===
- April 15 – Finau Mara, diplomat and politician, Ambassador-at-large.
- April 21 – Laisenia Qarase, former Prime Minister and politician.

=== May ===
- May 18 – Raman Pratap Singh, politician, president of the National Federation Party.

=== June ===
- June 4 – Giyannedra Prasad, lawyer and politician, member and former Deputy Speaker of Parliament.

=== July ===
- July 18 – Alefoso Yalayalatabua, rugby union player.

=== November ===
- November 26 – Tevita Momoedonu, 74, politician, Prime Minister of Fiji (2000, 2001).

== See also ==
- 2020–21 South Pacific cyclone season
- 2020–21 South Pacific cyclone season
- Cyclone Harold
- 2020 in Oceania
- COVID-19 pandemic in Fiji
