= 2021 in Fiji =

- Decades: 2000s; 2010s; 2020s
- See also: Other events of 2021; Timeline of Fijian history

Events of 2021 in Fiji.

== Incumbents ==
=== Government of Fiji ===
- President: George Konrote (until 12 November), Wiliame Katonivere (starting 12 November)
- Prime Minister: Frank Bainimarama
- Speaker: Epeli Nailatikau

=== Cabinet of Fiji ===
Party key	FijiFirst

Cabinet of Fiji: November 2018 – present
Portrait	Portfolio	Incumbent
	Prime Minister; Minister for iTaukei Affairs; Minister for Sugar; Sugar Industry; Foreign Affairs; Forestry	Frank Bainimarama
	Attorney-General; Minister for Economy, Civil Service, Communications, Housing and Community Development	Aiyaz Sayed-Khaiyum
	Minister for Education, Heritage and Arts	Premila Kumar
	Minister for Rural, Maritime Development and Disaster Management and Minister for Defence, National Security and Policing	Inia Seruiratu
	Minister for Fisheries	Semi Koroilavesau
	Minister for Employment, Productivity and Industrial Relations and Youth and Sports	Parveen Bala
	Minister for Women, Children and Poverty Alleviation	Rosy Akbar
	Minister for Agriculture, Waterways and Environment	Mahendra Reddy
	Minister for Health and Medical Services	Ifereimi Waqainabete
	Minister for Infrastructure and Meteorological Services and Minister for Lands and Mineral Resources	Jone Usamate
	Minister for Commerce, Trade, Tourism and Transport	Faiyaz Koya
Assistant Ministers
	Assistant Minister for Agriculture, Waterways and Environment	Viam Pillay
	Assistant Minister for Women, Children and Poverty Alleviation; Deputy Speaker of the House	Veena Bhatnagar
	Assistant Minister for Rural and Maritime Development and Disaster Management	Jale Sigarara
	Assistant Minister for Health and Medical Services	Alexander O'Connor
	Assistant Minister for Rural and Maritime Development and Disaster Management	Vijay Nath
	Assistant Minister for Employment, Productivity and Industrial Relations; Youth and Sports	Alvikh Maharaj
	Assistant Minister for Sugar Industry	George Vegnathan
	Assistant Minister for Employment, Productivity and Industrial Relations; Youth and Sports	Alipate Nagata
	Assistant Minister for Itaukei Affairs	Selai Adimaitoga
Others
	Speaker of the House	Epeli Nailatikau
	Leader of Opposition	Naiqama Lalabalavu
	Former president of the FijiFirst, now President of Fiji	Wiliame Katonivere

== Events ==
Ongoing – COVID-19 pandemic in Fiji

- 15 January – Nazahat Shameen Khan of Fiji wins the presidency of the United Nations Human Rights Council (UNHRC).
- 4 February – Pal Ahluwalia, Vice-Chancellor of the University of the South Pacific and his wife are deported to Australia.
- 24 February – Activists and non-governmental organizations report an increase in violence against women and girls since the COVID-19 pandemic and its associated lockdowns and curfews began a year ago. 64% of women in Fiji say they have been victims of some type of abuse.
- 10 April – The opening of Hanifa Mosque.

== Predicted and scheduled events ==
- 7 September – Constitution Day
- 11 October – Fiji Day
- 18 October – Mawlid (Birthday of Muhammad)
- 4 November – Diwali (Hindu, Jain, Sikh ″Festival of Lights)
- 25 December – Christmas

== Deaths ==
- March 10 – Joketani Cokanasiga, 84, politician.

== See also ==
- 2021–22 South Pacific cyclone season
- 2021 Pacific typhoon season
- 2020 in Oceania
