= Alex O'Connor (disambiguation) =

Alex J. O'Connor is an English public speaker and philosopher.

Alex O'Connor may also refer to:

- Rex Orange County (born 1998), British singer named Alexander James O'Connor
- Alexander O'Connor, Fijian politician and former Member of the Parliament

== See also ==
- Alex Connor, British racing driver
