= 2022 in Fiji =

- Decades: 2000s; 2010s; 2020s
- See also: Other events of 2022; Timeline of Fijian history

Events of 2022 in Fiji.

== Incumbents ==
=== Government of Fiji ===
- President: Wiliame Katonivere
- Prime Minister: Frank Bainimarama (until 24 December); Sitiveni Rabuka onwards
- Speaker: Epeli Nailatikau

== Events ==
Ongoing – COVID-19 pandemic in Fiji

- 27 May – Fiji announces that it will become the 14th member of the Indo-Pacific Economic Framework for Prosperity in order to counter Chinese influence in the Pacific. This comes amid a visit by Chinese foreign minister Wang Yi to Kiribati.
- 24 June – Fiji reports its first suspected case of monkeypox.
- 11 July – The 51st Pacific Islands Forum begins in Suva, amid escalating geopolitical competition between China and the United States.
- 16 December – Leader of People's Alliance is questioned by police after calling for the military to intervene in the electoral process of the 2022 Fijian election.
- 18 December – Final election result shows that the government of Fiji is poised to be a hung parliament. Incumbent long-time leader Frank Bainimarama loses majority.
- 22 December – Fiji mobilises its army in response to threats made against the country's minority groups and civil unrest.
- 24 December – Sitiveni Rabuka is confirmed as the new prime minister. Rabuka will hold the office again more than two decades after first leading the country as prime minister.

== Deaths ==
- 23 January – Osea Naiqamu, 60, politician.
- 2 February – Mosese Taga, 57, rugby union player.
- 23 February – Joeli Vidiri, 48, rugby union player.
- 29 August – Jai Ram Reddy, 85, politician.

== See also ==
- 2022–23 South Pacific cyclone season
- 2022 Pacific typhoon season
