= 2007 in Fiji =

- Decades: 1980s; 1990s; 2000s; 2010s; 2020s
- See also: Other events of 2007; Timeline of Fijian history

The following lists events that happened during 2007 in the Republic of Fiji.

== Incumbents ==
- President: Josefa Iloilo (starting January 4) along with Frank Bainimarama
- Prime Minister: Jona Senilagakali (until January 4), Frank Bainimarama (starting January 4)

== Events ==
=== January ===
- January 4 - Commodore Frank Bainimarama, who had carried out a military coup on 5 December, restores the deposed President Ratu Josefa Iloilo to office.
- January 4 - President Iloilo appoints Bainimarama as Prime Minister of Fiji.
