= 2017 in Fiji =

- Decades: 1990s; 2000s; 2010s; 2020s
- See also: Other events of 2017; Timeline of Fijian history

Events in the year 2017 in Fiji.

== Incumbents ==
- President: George Konrote
- Prime Minister: Frank Bainimarama

== Events ==
- 148 tabua are repatriated to Fiji from New Zealand on the 29 of May
- The 2017 United Nations Climate Change Conference in November in Bonn, Germany, was led by Fiji.
- Ongoing rebuilding after Cyclone Winston

== Deaths ==
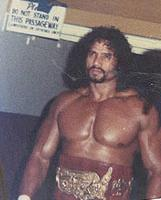
Jimmy Snuka

- 15 January – Jimmy Snuka, professional wrestler and actor (b. 1943).
- 21 June – Udit Narayan, politician (b. 1960)
