= 2006 in Fiji =

- Decades: 1980s; 1990s; 2000s; 2010s; 2020s
- See also: Other events of 2006; Timeline of Fijian history

The following lists events that happened during 2006 in the Republic of Fiji.

== Incumbents ==
- President: Josefa Iloilo (until December 5), Frank Bainimarama (starting December 5)
- Vice-President: Joni Madraiwiwi (until December 5), vacant thereafter
- Prime Minister: Laisenia Qarase (until December 5), Jona Senilagakali (starting December 5)

== Events ==
=== June ===
- June 22 - Mahendra Chaudhry warns that the Fiji Labour Party will withdraw from the coalition government if government programs continue to be biased towards indigenous Fijians.

=== December ===
- December 5 — Commodore Frank Bainimarama, Commander of the Republic of Fiji Military Forces, overthrows the government of Prime Minister Laisenia Qarase.
