= 2018 in Fiji =

- Decades: 1990s; 2000s; 2010s; 2020s
- See also: Other events of 2018; Timeline of Fijian history

Events in the year 2018 in Fiji.

== Incumbents ==
- President: George Konrote
- Prime Minister: Frank Bainimarama

== Events ==
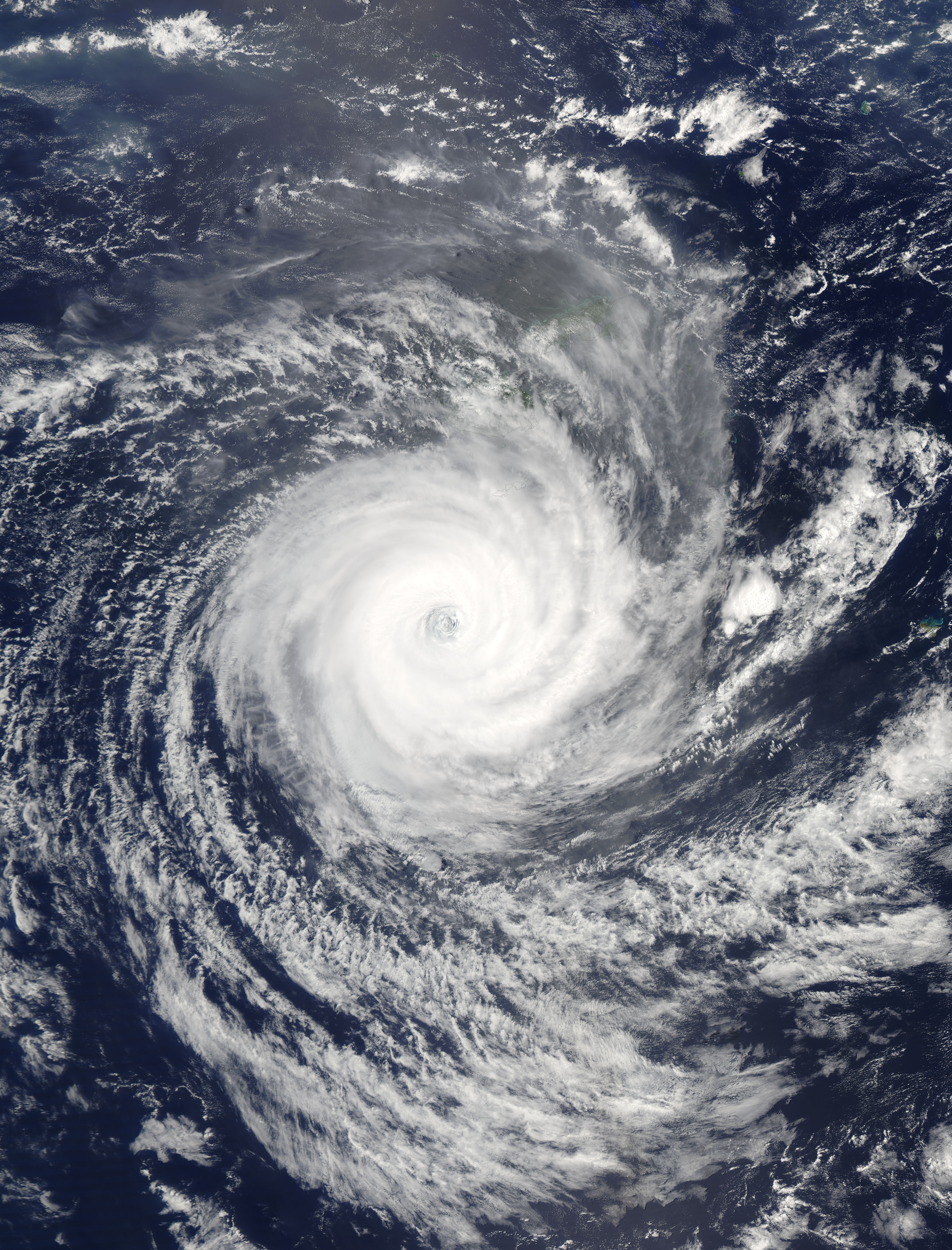
Cyclone Gita at peak intensity south of Fiji on 14 February

- 13 February – Fiji hit by the Cyclone Gita

=== Scheduled ===
- 2018 Fijian general election

== Deaths ==
- 27 January – Mereoni Vibose, athlete (b. 1951).
- 4 October – Konisi Yabaki, 77, politician, Minister for Fisheries and Forests 2001–2006.
