= 2014 in Fiji =

- Decades: 1990s; 2000s; 2010s; 2020s
- See also: Other events of 2014; Timeline of Fijian history

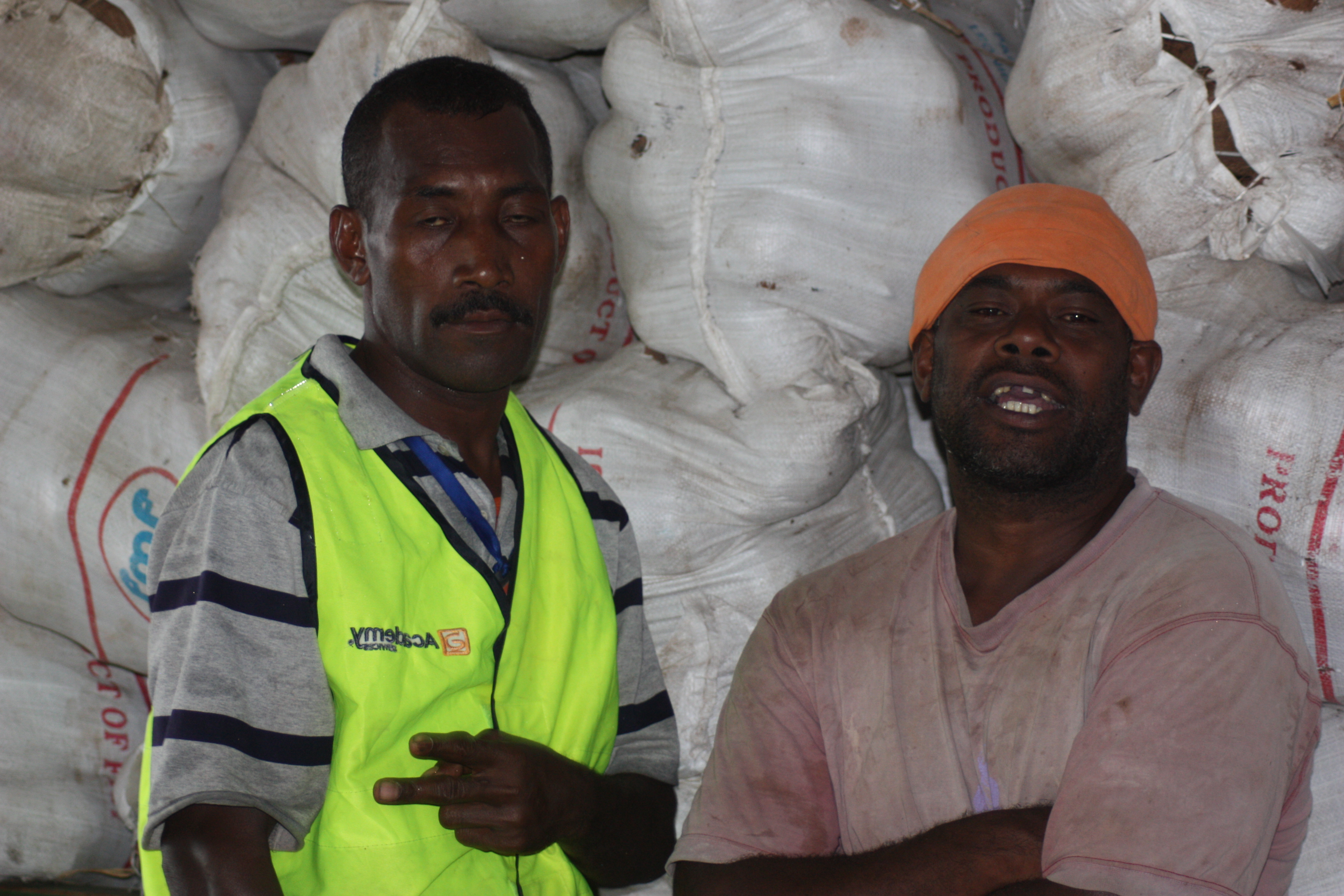

The following lists events that happened during 2014 in Fiji.

== Incumbents ==
- President: Epeli Nailatikau
- Prime Minister: Frank Bainimarama

== Events ==
=== March ===
- March 12 - Fiji's Health Department confirms that eleven people have died and over 10,000 people have been infected in an outbreak of the type three strain of dengue fever.

=== July ===
- July 3 - The government of Tonga reveals a proposal to trade the disputed Minerva Reefs to Fiji in exchange for the Lau Islands, in an effort to settle a decades-old territorial dispute between the two Pacific countries.

=== September ===
- September 17 - Voters in Fiji go to the polls for the first election since a coup in 2006, with coup leader Voreqe Bainimarama's FijiFirst Party achieving almost 60 per cent of the vote.
- September 22 - The Fiji First Party led by Voreqe Bainimarama wins 32 out of 50 seats in the Parliament in last week's general election.

=== October ===
- October 31 - Australia and the United States lift sanctions against Fiji following recent democratic elections.
