= 2019 in Fiji =

- Decades: 1990s; 2000s; 2010s; 2020s
- See also: Other events of 2019; Timeline of Fijian history

Events in the year 2019 in Fiji.

== Incumbents ==
- President: Jioji Konrote
- Prime Minister: Frank Bainimarama

== Events ==
- 8 October – An altercation between Chinese and Taiwanese diplomats during a reception at the Grand Pacific hotel in Suva leaves one Taiwanese official in hospital. The incident is seen as a spilling over of diplomatic tensions between the two governments over their respective influences across the Pacific.
- 29 December – Two people are killed as Cyclone Sarai passes southeast of the country, bringing heavy wind and rain and forcing the temporary evacuation of more than 2,000 people.

== Deaths ==
- 5 February – Manasa Qoro, rugby union player (b. 1964).
- 19 June – Filipe Bole, politician, Minister for Foreign Affairs (b. 1936).

== See also ==
- 2019 Oceania Cup (rugby league)
