= British Peer (ship) =

British sailing ship

Coordinates: 33°30.4′S 18°18.70′E

History

United Kingdom
- Operator: British Shipowners Company
- Builder: Harland & Wolff, Belfast
- Launched: 31 January 1865
- Christened: British Peer
- Acquired: 1883, Nourse Line
- Fate: Wrecked, 8 December 1896 at Saldanha Bay; 4 survivors

General characteristics
- Class & type: Barque
- Displacement: 1428 tons
- Length: 247.5 ft (75 m); Lengthened by 32 ft (9.8 m) in 1878
- Beam: 36.4 ft (11 m)
- Draught: 22.5 ft (7 m)
- Propulsion: Sail
- Crew: 22
- Notes: Iron hull

British Peer was a 1428-ton three-masted iron sailing ship built for the British Shipowners Company at the Harland & Wolff yards in Belfast, Ireland, in 1865. She was 247.5 feet (75.4 m) long, 36.4 feet (11.1 m) wide and 22.5 feet (6.9 m) deep. She was bought by the Nourse Line in 1883, and was the fastest vessel in their fleet until British Ambassador was commissioned. In 1878, however, British Peer's sailing power was compromised when alterations were made to increase her tonnage by lengthening her hull by 32 feet (9.8 m), and she was never as fast again. She carried a crew of 23, including her master.

On 13 March 1891, during the Great Blizzard of 1891, British Peer struck the 1222-ton steamer Roxburgh Castle, causing Roxburgh Castle to sink with the loss of 22 lives; there were two survivors.

British Peer, like other Nourse Line ships, was involved in the indentured labour trade. On 23 April 1892, she carried 527 Indian indentured labourers to Fiji. Two months later, on 11 June 1892, she arrived in Suriname with Indian indentured labourers. She also repatriated in September 1894 from Saint Lucia to India 450 Indians who had completed their indenture.

British Peer had first visited South Africa in 1886, while on a voyage carrying indentured labourers. In November 1894, she again stopped in at the Cape of Good Hope, carrying a cargo of salt and 471 Indian indentured labourers. On 8 December 1896, she struck a reef in Saldanha Bay, South Africa, and was destroyed; there were only four survivors. A Court of Enquiry, held on 7 January 1897, found that "the loss of the ship was occasioned by reckless navigation on the part of the master". The wreck of British Peer itself still lies in about 9 metres (30 ft) of water in Saldanha Bay.

== See also ==
- Indian Indenture Ships to Fiji
- Indian indenture system
