= Timeline of Fijian history =

History of Fiji, Summary

The timeline below shows the history of the island Fiji, from the ancient times to the present day.

== Early history ==
Date	Event
1500 BC – 1400 BC	Fiji was suggested to have been settled by Micronesian, before Melanesians, but evidence is lacking that this happened – either in oral accounts or geological data, except that of Ma'afu. Archaeological finding suggest long standing occupation of the islands. Cultural and traditional activity is more akin to Polynesian cultural undertaking or vice versa, but one certain impact can be deduced from outside intervention polarizing the indigenous Culture into what it is today.

== 1822 to 1874 ==
Date	Event
1822	European settlement begins at Levuka, Fiji's first modern town.
1830	The first Christian missionaries from Tahiti, Hatai, Arue and Tahaara, arrive at Lakeba, brought via Tonga by the London Missionary Society.
1835	Methodist missionaries, William Cross and David Cargill, arrive in Lakeba. They are accompanied by emissaries from Taufa'ahau the Tongan high chief and by Josua Mateinaniu, a Fijian from Vulaga who had been converted at Vava'u in 1834.
1840	First visit from an American exploring expedition, the US Exploring Expedition, commanded by Captain Charles Wilkes. 1845 Conversion of Ratu Ravisa (Varani), chief of Viwa, influenced by the ministry of Rev. John Hunt. Varani is the first significant Fijian missionary among the islands and a strong counter-cultural influence upon Ratu Seru Cakobau, preeminent among the warring chiefs of Fiji.
1847	Prince Enele Ma'afu of Tonga arrived in Fiji and established himself in Lakeba by 1848. Ma'afu's arrival and settling in Lakeba were strengthened by his blood relationship with Roko Taliai Tupou the Tui Nayau.
1849	Trading store of United States Consul and settler John Brown Williams accidentally destroyed by stray cannon fire and subsequently looted by Fijian natives.
1851	First threatening visit from the United States Navy, demanding US$5,000 for Williams's losses.
1853	Warlord Ratu Seru Epenisa Cakobau installed as Vunivalu (Paramount Chief) of Bau, and claims the title of Tui Viti (King of Fiji).
1854	Cakobau converts to Christianity, influenced by the unifying features of Christianity, its obvious connections with the Western world and the presence in Fiji of a Tongan army led by Taufa'ahau and Ma'afu.
1855	Cakobau crushes Rewa revolt. The leader of the revolt, Mara, is executed four years later. John Brown Williams's home is destroyed by arson. Visit from warship USS John Adams, demanding almost $44,000 compensation; seizes some islands as mortgage.
1858	Arrival of the first British Consul William Thomas Pritchard. Hostile visit from USS Vandalia. Cakobau offers to cede the islands to the United Kingdom for US$40,000.
1860	Ratu Meli Salabogi of Nabukadra Village, declares Nakorotubu District in Ra as an independent state. This was a protest to Great Britain of Cakobau declaring himself as the leading chief- Tui Viti.
1862	The United Kingdom refused to annex Fiji, claiming to have ascertained from Cakobau's fellow chiefs that he was not universally accepted as King of Fiji and that he did not have the authority to cede the islands.
1865	Confederacy of Fijian chiefs formed.
1867	Threats to shell Levuka from an American warship. Amid increasing unrest, Cakobau crowned King of Bau by European settlers.
1868	The Australian-based Polynesia Company acquires land near Suva, in return for promising to pay Cakobau's debts.
1871	Establishment of the Kingdom of Fiji as a constitutional monarchy, with Cakobau as King but with real power in the hands of a Cabinet and Legislature dominated by settlers from Australia.
1872	Lavish overspending saddles the new kingdom with debt. John Bates Thurston, a government official, approaches the United Kingdom on Cakobau's behalf with an offer to cede the islands.
1874	10 October – Fiji becomes a British colony.

== 1875 to 1970 ==
Date	Event
1875	An outbreak of measles leaves a third of the Fijian population dead.
1876	Great Council of Chiefs established.
1879	Arrival of 463 indentured labourers from India – the first of some 61,000 to come over the ensuing 37 years. The British Army had awarded Jhinu Singh the Western Side Crown Land To farm where the markings of the Military Bunker sitting in front of the entrance driveway to his home and also the water reservoir on the other side of Queens Road
1881	First large sugar mill built at Nausori. Rotuma Island annexed to Fiji.
1882	Capital moved from Levuka to Suva.
1897	Arrival in Suva of Hannah Dudley, first European Christian missionary among the Indians. She works among both the indentured and "free" Indians encouraging education and welfare programs.
1904	Legislative Council reconstituted as a partially elected body, with European male settlers enfranchised and Fijian chiefs given an indirect input. Most seats still filled by nomination rather than election.
1916	End of the importing of indentured labourers from India, this decision brought about by agitation within India and the visit to Fiji by Anglican clergyman Rev. Charles Freer Andrews, close confidant of Mahatma Gandhi. First Indian appointed to Legislative Council.
1917	Count Felix von Luckner arrested on Wakaya Island.
1918	14% of the population killed by the Spanish flu pandemic (within sixteen days).
1928	First flight from Hawaii lands at Suva.
1929	Wealthy Indians enfranchised for the first time; Indian representation in the Legislative Council made elective.
1935	Establishment in Ra Province on Viti Levu of the Toko Farmers movement led by Ratu Nacanieli Rawaidranu and influenced by the Methodist missionary Arthur Lelean. Lelean encourages the farmers to be independent in their commercial operations and also to initiate moves for the formation of an independent Methodist Church.
1939	Nadi Airport built as an Allied air base.
1940	Native Land Trust Board established under the chairmanship of Ratu Sir Lala Sukuna.
1951	Founding of Fiji Airways (after which it was renamed to Air Pacific; it was then renamed to Fiji Airways on June the 27th, 2013).
1953	Visit of Queen Elizabeth II. Legislative Council expanded – but elective seats still a minority. Suva earthquake
1954	Ratu Sukuna appointed first Speaker of the Legislative Council.
1963	Indigenous Fijians enfranchised. Indigenous representation in the Legislative Council made elective, except for two members chosen by the Great Council of Chiefs. Women enfranchised.
1964	Member System introduced, with Legislative Council members appointed to oversee government departments. This was the first step towards the establishment of a Cabinet system.
1965	Constitutional conference in London fails to agree on a timetable for a transition to internal self-government, but subsequent negotiations lead to compromises.
1967	Responsible government instituted; Ratu Kamisese Mara appointed first Chief Minister.
1968	University of the South Pacific established.
1970	April – Constitutional conference in London; Mara and Sidiq Koya agree on a compromise constitutional formula. 10 October – Fiji attains independence, ending 96 years of British rule.

== 1972 to 2020 ==
Date	Event
1972	First post-independence election won by Ratu Mara's Alliance Party.
1973	Sugar industry nationalized.
1977	Constitutional crisis in which Governor-General Ratu Sir George Cakobau overturns election results, following the failure of the winning National Federation Party to put together a government. The election held to resolve the impasse results in a landslide for the Alliance Party.
1978	Fijian peacekeeping troops sent to Lebanon.
1981	Fijian peacekeeping troops sent to the Sinai following Israel's withdrawal.
1987	General election won by the Labour-National Federation Party coalition. On 13 April, Timoci Bavadra becomes Prime Minister for a month. 14 May – Lieutenant Colonel Sitiveni Rabuka carries out a coup d'état. 25 September – Rabuka stages a second coup to consolidate the gains of the first. 7 October – Rabuka proclaims a republic, severing the 113-year link to the British Monarchy. Fiji expelled from the Commonwealth of Nations. 5 December – Rabuka appoints Ratu Sir Penaia Ganilau as Fiji's first President.
1990	New Constitution institutionalises ethnic Fijian domination of the political system. Group Against Racial Discrimination (GARD) formed to oppose the unilaterally imposed constitution and restore the 1970 constitution.
1992	Rabuka becomes Prime Minister following elections held under the new constitution.
1994	Election results force Rabuka to open negotiations with the Indo-Fijian-dominated opposition.
1995	Rabuka establishes the Constitutional Review Commission
1997	Constitutional conference leads to a new constitution, supported by most leaders of the indigenous Fijian and Indo-Fijian communities. Fiji is re-admitted to the Commonwealth of Nations.
1999	First general election held under the 1997 Constitution won by Fiji Labour Party (FLP). Mahendra Chaudhry becomes first Prime Minister of Indian descent.
2000	19 May – civilian coup d'état instigated by George Speight effectively topples the Chaudhry government. 29 May – Commodore Frank Bainimarama assumes executive power after the resignation, possibly forced, of President Mara. 2 November – Mutiny at Suva's Queen Elizabeth Barracks. 15 November – High Court orders the reinstatement of the constitution.
2001	1 March – Court of Appeal upholds High Court order reinstating constitution. September – General election held to restore democracy; a plurality won by interim Prime Minister Laisenia Qarase's Soqosoqo Duavata ni Lewenivanua (SDL). Dec – Fiji readmitted to the Commonwealth
2005	May – Amid much controversy, the Qarase government proposes Reconciliation and Unity Commission, with power to recommend compensation for victims of the 2000 coup, and amnesty for its perpetrators.
2006	May 6–13 – SDL narrowly beats the FLP in parliamentary elections; multi-party Cabinet formed subsequently. 5 December 2006 – Commodore Bainimarama executes a coup against the government of Laisenia Qarase and declares himself acting president of Fiji.
2007	January 4–5 – Bainimarama restores Iloilo to the presidency; Iloilo endorses Bainimarama's coup and formally appoints him prime minister the next day.
2009	April – After the Court of Appeal rules that the 2006 coup was illegal, Iloilo suspends all judges and revokes the constitution. Bainimarama was reappointed Prime Minister and his Cabinet was reinstated. In July, Iloilo is replaced as president by Brigadier-General Ratu Epeli Nailatikau, a former Military commander.
2013	September – A new constitution is promulgated to replace the 1997 Constitution.
2014	September 17 – Bainimarama's FijiFirst Party wins the first general elections held since 2006.
2020	March 2020 – present: COVID-19 pandemic in Fiji. A total of 66 cases confirmed and 834 deaths as of March 2021.
2021	March 2020 – present: COVID-19 pandemic in Fiji. A total of 66 cases confirmed and 834 deaths as of March 2021.

== See also ==
- List of heads of state of Fiji
- List of prime ministers of Fiji
- Politics of Fiji
