= Osea Naiqamu =

Fijian politician (1961–2022)

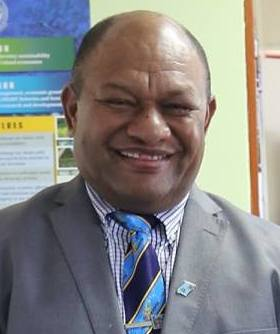
- Naiqamu in 2018

Minister for Forestry
- In office 21 November 2018 – June 2021

Personal details
- Born: 2 August 1961 Colony of Fiji, British Empire
- Died: 23 January 2022 (aged 60) Natabua, Lautoka, Fiji
- Party: FijiFirst

Osea Naiqamu (2 August 1961 – 23 January 2022) was a Fijian politician and member of the Parliament of Fiji. As a member the FijiFirst Party, Naiqamu served as the Minister for Forestry.

Naiqamu was re-elected to Parliament in the 2018 election. He died in Natabua on 23 January 2022.
