= Jale Sigarara =

Fijian politician

Jale Sigarara is a Fijian politician, former Member of the Parliament of Fiji, and former Assistant Minister. He is a member of the FijiFirst Party.

Sigara is from Wainunu in Bua Province. He previously worked as a civil servant, serving 20 years in the Ministry of Forests and 20 years in the Fijian Affairs Board. He retired in 2014, but served as a representative on the Bua Provincial Council. He subsequently ran as a FijiFirst candidate in the 2018 election and was elected with 697 votes.

Sigarara was initially appointed co-assistant Minister for Agriculture, Waterways, Rural and Maritime Development alongside Viam Pillay. Following a Cabinet reshuffle in April 2020, he was appointed alongside Vijay Nath as one of two Assistant Ministers for Disaster Management and Rural and Maritime Development.

In the 2022 General Elections, he ran for re-election under the FijiFirst banner, and placed 35th, garnering 422 votes. As FijiFirst won 26 seats, Sigarara was unable to qualify for a seat. He was succeeded in the Assistant Minister portfolio by Ratu Isikeli Tuiwailevu.
