= George Vegnathan =

Fijian politician

George Vegnathan is a Fijian politician and former Member of the Parliament of Fiji for the FijiFirst Party. He served as the Assistant Minister for the Sugar Industry. He is from Vunika, Macuata, and lives in Labasa. Prior to his election, he worked as a teacher for 32 years. He also works as the executive officer for TISI Sangam in Labasa. He was elected to Parliament in the 2018 election. He is married, and has four children. In the 2022 election, Vegnathan placed 37th in the party list, garnering 360 votes, therefore being unable to qualify for a seat in Parliament, and subsequently lost his Assistant Minister portfolio.
