= Selai Adimaitoga =

Fijian politician

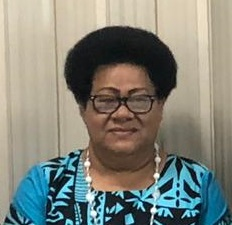
Selai Adimaitoga in 2019

Selai Adimaitoga is a Fijian politician and a former Member of the Parliament of Fiji for the FijiFirst Party. She was elected to Parliament in the 2018 election.

Adimaitoga comes from a lower class background, starting as a cane farmer. She is known as Pu Selai which means grandmother.
