= Alipate Nagata =

Fijian politician

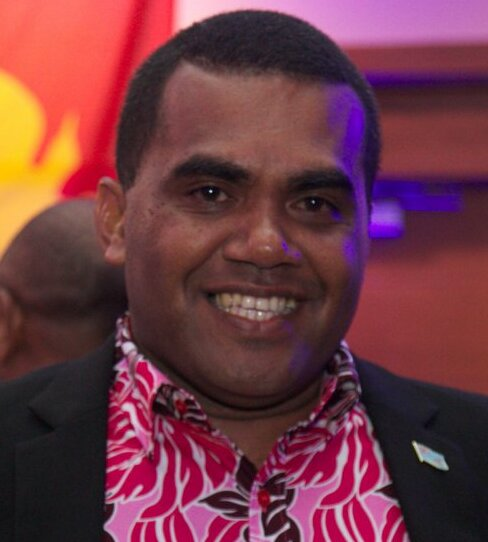
Alipate Nagata at the 2019 Young Leaders Forum

Alipate Tuicolo Nagata is a Fijian politician. He is a member of the FijiFirst party. He is a member of parliament.

A former school teacher, Nagata stood as a candidate for FijiFirst in the 2018 elections. He received an unexpectedly high number of votes, ranking in the top 10 candidates, apparently due to voters confusing his candidate number (668) with that of FijiFirst leader Frank Bainimarama (688). Fiji's election system gives each candidate a three digit number, and no names are listed on the ballot.
