= Vijay Nath =

Fijian politician

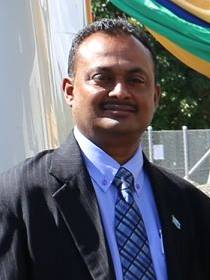
Nath in May 2016

Vijay Nath is a Fijian politician and Member of the Parliament of Fiji for the FijiFirst Party. He served as the Assistant Minister for Disaster Management and Rural and Maritime Development.

Nath is from Nausori. He was elected with 1616 votes in the 2014 Fijian general election and was appointed Assistant Minister for Education, Heritage and Arts. In May 2015 he was appointed Assistant Minister of Infrastructure and Transport Ministry following the resignation of Pio Tikoduadua.

He was re-elected to Parliament in the 2018 election with 2256 votes, and was appointed Assistant Minister of Local Government, Housing and Community Development. Following a Cabinet reshuffle in April 2020, Nath was appointed alongside Jale Sigarara as one of two Assistant Ministers for Disaster Management and Rural and Maritime Development.

In the 2022 Fijian general election, Nath placed 10th in the FijiFirst party list, with 1435 votes, and was re-elected to a 3rd term. However, FijiFirst failed to form government, and instead formed Opposition with a People's Alliance-led coalition government. Him and Sigarara were succeeded as Assistant Minister by Ratu Isikeli Tuiwailevu.
