= Alexander O'Connor =

Fijian politician

Alexander David O'Connor is a Fijian politician and former Member of the Parliament of Fiji for the FijiFirst Party. He served as the assistant Minister for Health and Medical Services. He was re-elected to Parliament in the 2018 election. O'Connor is from Nakasaleka, Kadavu. He resides in Lautoka. He has worked in the private sector at management level. He is unmarried.
