= Outline of Fiji =

Island country in the South Pacific Ocean

The Flag of Fiji

The Coat of arms of Fiji

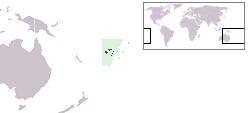
The location of Fiji

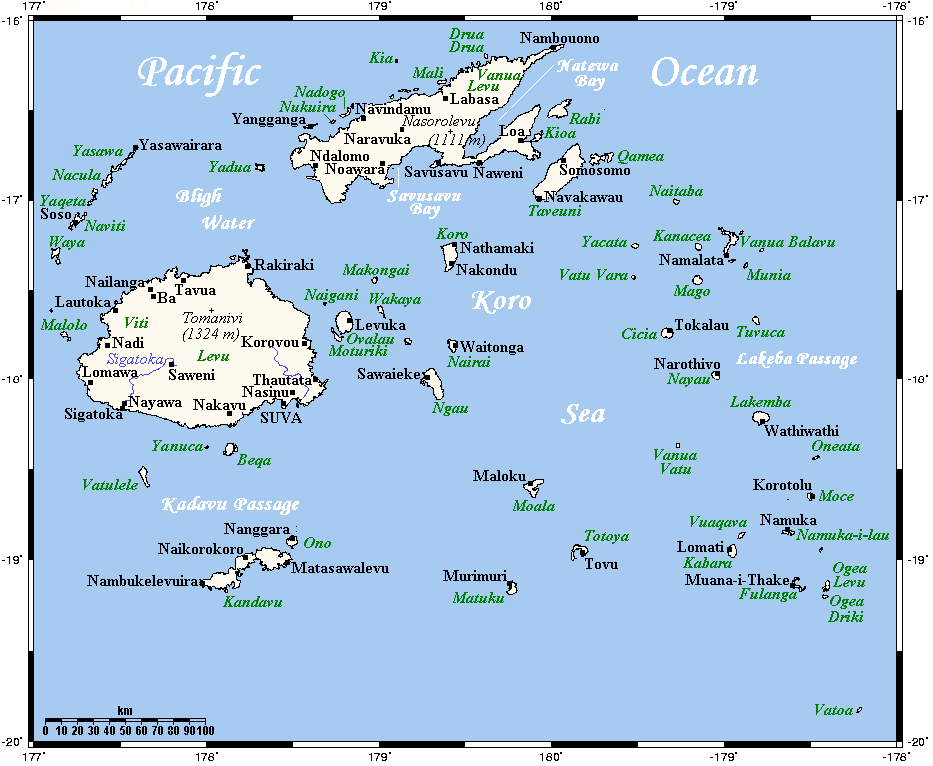
An enlargeable map of the Republic of the Fiji Islands

The following outline is provided as an overview of and topical guide to Fiji:

Republic of Fiji – sovereign island nation located in the South Pacific Ocean east of Vanuatu, west of Tonga and south of Tuvalu. The country occupies an archipelago of about 322 islands, of which 106 are permanently inhabited, and 522 islets. The two major islands, Viti Levu and Vanua Levu, account for 87% of the population.

== General reference ==
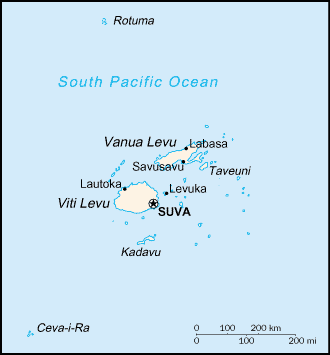
An enlargeable basic map of Fiji

- Pronunciation: /ˈfiːdʒiː/
- Common English country names: Fiji or the Fiji Islands
- Official English country name: The Republic of Fiji
- Common endonym(s): Viti, फ़िजी
- Official endonym(s): Matanitu Tugalala o Viti, फ़िजी गणराज्य
- Adjectival(s): Fijian
- Demonym(s): Fijian
- Etymology: Name of Fiji
- ISO country codes: FJ, FJI, 242
- ISO region codes: See ISO 3166-2:FJ
- Internet country code top-level domain: .fj

== Geography of Fiji ==
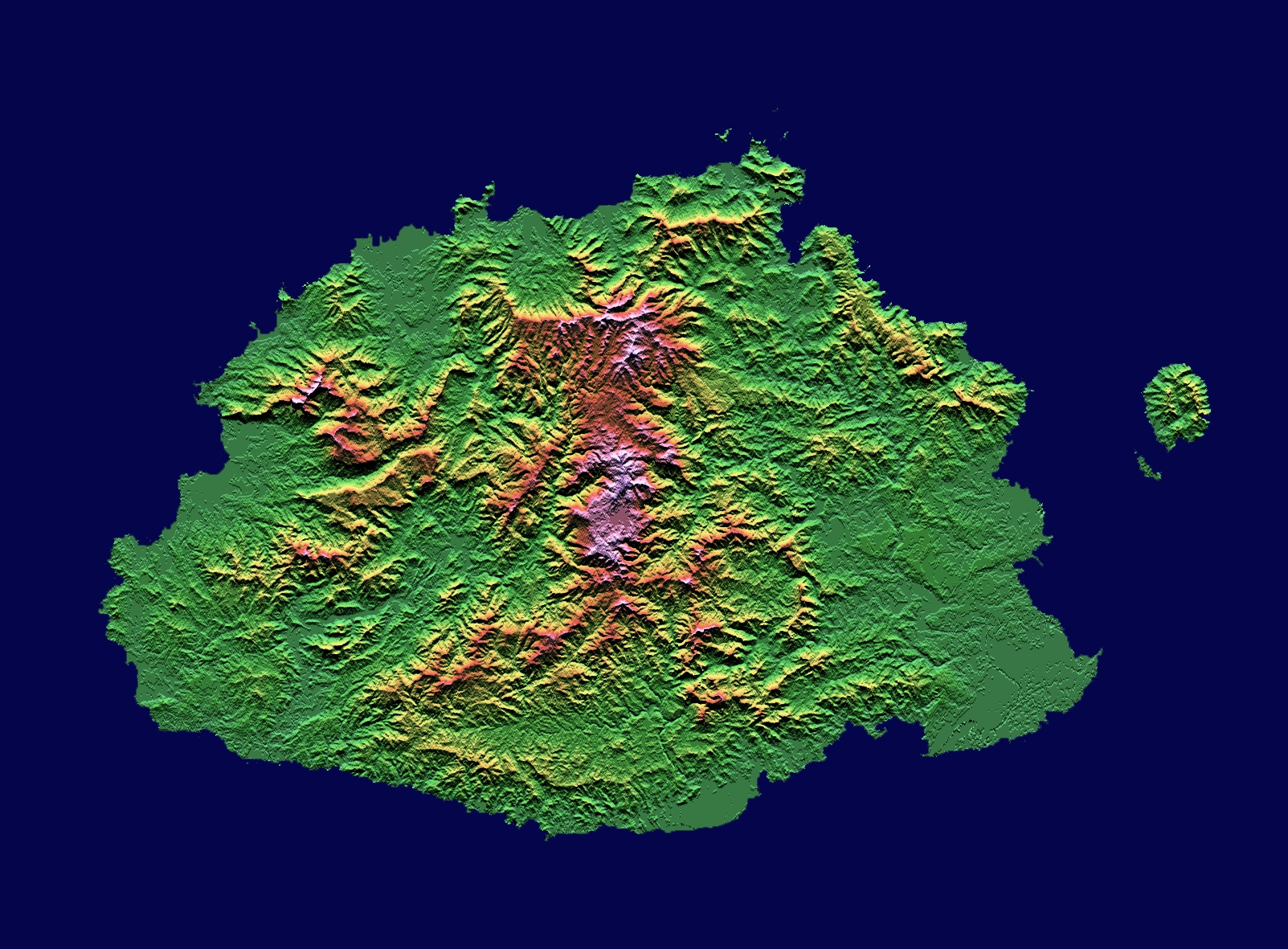
An enlargeable topographic map of the island of Viti Levu

Geography of Fiji

- Fiji is: a country
- Location:
  - Southern Hemisphere and Eastern Hemisphere
  - Pacific Ocean
    - South Pacific
      - Oceania
        - Melanesia
  - Time zone: UTC+12
  - Extreme points of Fiji
    - High: Tomanivi 1,324 m (4,344 ft)
    - Low: South Pacific Ocean 0 m
  - Land boundaries: none
  - Coastline: 1,129 km
- Population of Fiji: 827,900 (2007) - 157th most populous country
- Area of Fiji: 18,274 km^{2}
- Atlas of Fiji

=== Environment of Fiji ===
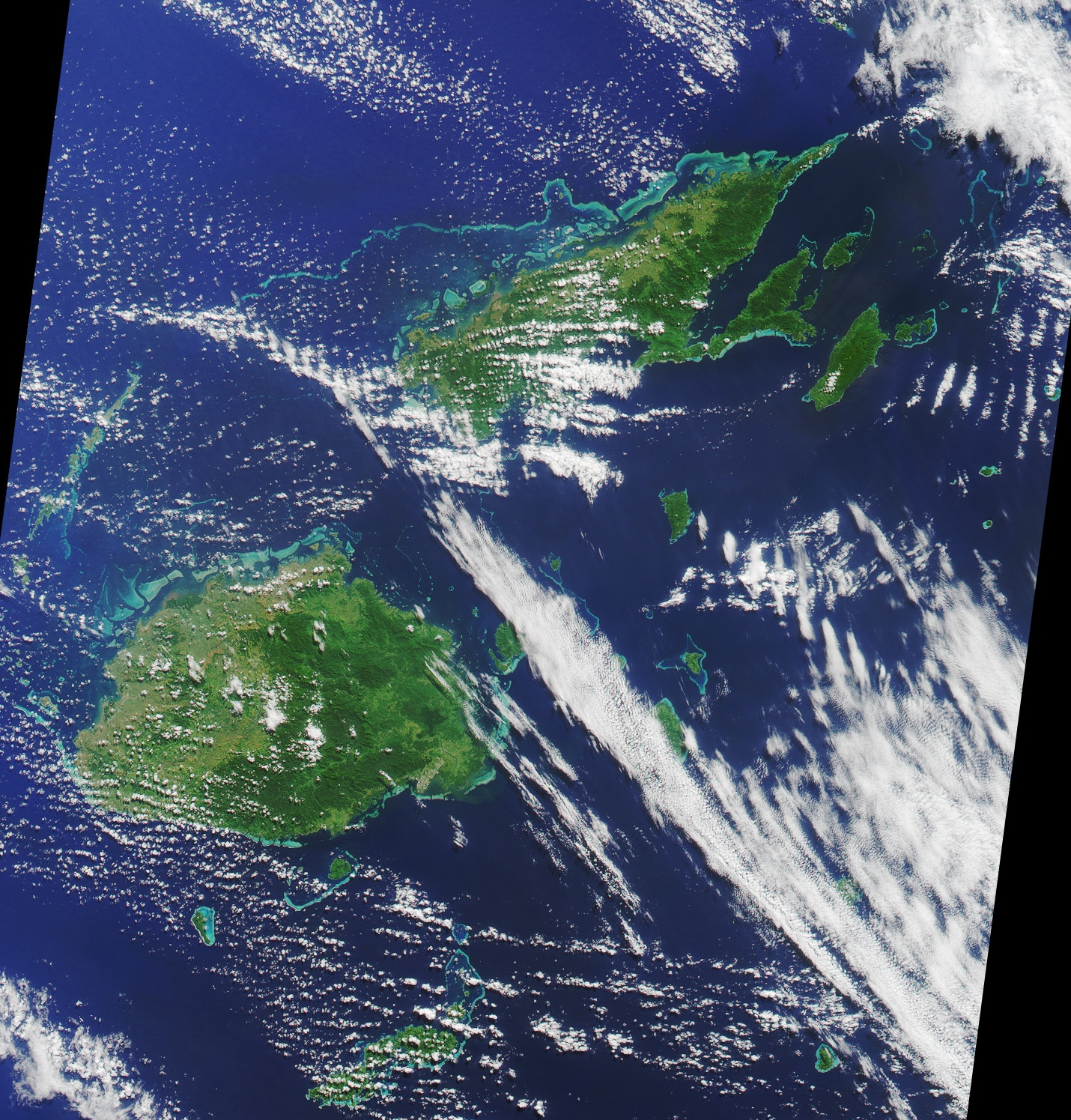
An enlargeable satellite image of Fiji

- Climate of Fiji
- Renewable energy in Fiji
- Geology of Fiji
- Protected areas of Fiji
  - Biosphere reserves in Fiji
  - National parks of Fiji
- Wildlife of Fiji
  - Fauna of Fiji
    - Birds of Fiji
    - Mammals of Fiji

==== Natural geographic features of Fiji ====
- Islands of Fiji
- Lakes of Fiji
- Mountains of Fiji
  - Volcanoes in Fiji
- Rivers of Fiji
  - Waterfalls of Fiji
- World Heritage Sites in Fiji: None

=== Regions of Fiji ===
Regions of Fiji

==== Ecoregions of Fiji ====
List of ecoregions in Fiji

==== Administrative divisions of Fiji ====
- Provinces of Fiji

===== Provinces of Fiji =====
Provinces of Fiji

===== Municipalities of Fiji =====
- Capital of Fiji: Suva
- Cities of Fiji

=== Demography of Fiji ===
Demographics of Fiji

== Government and politics of Fiji ==
Politics of Fiji

- Form of government: parliamentary representative democratic republic.
- Capital of Fiji: Suva
- Elections in Fiji
- Political parties in Fiji

=== Branches of the government of Fiji ===
Government of Fiji

==== Executive branch of the government of Fiji ====
- Head of state: President of Fiji, Jioji Konrote
- Head of government: Prime Minister of Fiji, Josaia Voreqe (Frank) Bainimarama
- Cabinet: Cabinet of Fiji

==== Legislative branch of the government of Fiji ====
- Parliament of Fiji (unicameral, since 2014)
- Previous Parliament (bicameral, 1970–2006) :
  - Upper house: Senate
  - Lower house: House of Representatives

==== Judicial branch of the government of Fiji ====
Court system of Fiji

- Supreme Court of Fiji

=== Foreign relations of Fiji ===
Foreign relations of Fiji

- Diplomatic missions in Fiji
- Diplomatic missions of Fiji

==== International organization membership ====
The Republic of the Fiji Islands is a member of:

- African, Caribbean, and Pacific Group of States (ACP)
- Asian Development Bank (ADB)
- Colombo Plan (CP)
- Commonwealth of Nations
- Food and Agriculture Organization (FAO)
- Group of 77 (G77)
- International Bank for Reconstruction and Development (IBRD)
- International Civil Aviation Organization (ICAO)
- International Criminal Court (ICCt)
- International Criminal Police Organization (Interpol)
- International Development Association (IDA)
- International Federation of Red Cross and Red Crescent Societies (IFRCS)
- International Finance Corporation (IFC)
- International Fund for Agricultural Development (IFAD)
- International Hydrographic Organization (IHO)
- International Labour Organization (ILO)
- International Maritime Organization (IMO)
- International Monetary Fund (IMF)
- International Olympic Committee (IOC)
- International Organization for Standardization (ISO)
- International Red Cross and Red Crescent Movement (ICRM)
- International Telecommunication Union (ITU)
- International Telecommunications Satellite Organization (ITSO)
- International Trade Union Confederation (ITUC)
- Multilateral Investment Guarantee Agency (MIGA)
- Organisation for the Prohibition of Chemical Weapons (OPCW)
- Pacific Islands Forum (PIF)
- Permanent Court of Arbitration (PCA)
- Secretariat of the Pacific Community (SPC)
- South Pacific Regional Trade and Economic Cooperation Agreement (Sparteca)
- United Nations (UN)
- United Nations Conference on Trade and Development (UNCTAD)
- United Nations Educational, Scientific, and Cultural Organization (UNESCO)
- United Nations Industrial Development Organization (UNIDO)
- United Nations Integrated Mission in Timor-Leste (UNMIT)
- United Nations Mission in the Sudan (UNMIS)
- Universal Postal Union (UPU)
- World Customs Organization (WCO)
- World Federation of Trade Unions (WFTU)
- World Health Organization (WHO)
- World Intellectual Property Organization (WIPO)
- World Meteorological Organization (WMO)
- World Tourism Organization (UNWTO)
- World Trade Organization (WTO)

=== Law and order in Fiji ===
Law of Fiji

- 2013 Constitution of Fiji
- previous: 1997 Constitution of Fiji
- Crime in Fiji
- Human rights in Fiji
  - LGBT rights in Fiji
  - Freedom of religion in Fiji
- Law enforcement in Fiji

=== Military of Fiji ===
- Command
  - Commander-in-chief: President Ratu Epeli Nailatikau
  - Commander: Brigadier Mosese Tikoitoga
    - Ministry of Defence of Fiji
- Forces
  - Army of Fiji
  - Navy of Fiji
  - Air Force of Fiji
  - Special forces of Fiji
- Military history of Fiji
- Military ranks of Fiji

=== Local government in Fiji ===
Local government in Fiji

== History of Fiji ==
History of Fiji

- Timeline of the history of Fiji
- Current events of Fiji
- Military history of Fiji

== Culture of Fiji ==
Culture of Fiji

- Architecture of Fiji
- Cuisine of Fiji
- List of festivals in Fiji
- Languages of Fiji
- Media in Fiji
- National symbols of Fiji
  - Coat of arms of Fiji
  - Flag of Fiji
  - National anthem of Fiji
- People of Fiji
- Public holidays in Fiji
- Records of Fiji
- Religion in Fiji
  - Christianity in Fiji
  - Hinduism in Fiji
  - Islam in Fiji
  - Judaism in Fiji
  - Sikhism in Fiji
- World Heritage Sites in Fiji: 1: Levuka Historical Port Town

=== Art in Fiji ===
- Art in Fiji
- Cinema of Fiji
- Fijian literature
- Music of Fiji
- Television in Fiji
- Theatre in Fiji

=== Sports in Fiji ===
Sports in Fiji

- Football in Fiji
- Fiji at the Olympics
- Fiji at the Paralympics

== Economy and infrastructure of Fiji ==
Economy of Fiji

- Economic rank, by nominal GDP (2007): 137th (one hundred and thirty seventh)
- Agriculture in Fiji
- Banking in Fiji
  - National Bank of Fiji
- Communications in Fiji
  - Internet in Fiji
- Companies of Fiji
- Currency of Fiji: Dollar
  - ISO 4217: FJD
- Energy in Fiji
  - Energy policy of Fiji
  - Oil industry in Fiji
- Mining in Fiji
- Tourism in Fiji
  - Visa policy of Fiji
- Fiji Stock Exchange

== Education in Fiji ==
Education in Fiji

== Infrastructure of Fiji ==
- Health care in Fiji
- Transportation in Fiji
  - Airports in Fiji
  - Rail transport in Fiji
  - Roads in Fiji
    - Rewa Bridge
    - Kings Road (Fiji)

== See also ==
Fiji

- Index of Fiji-related articles
- List of Fiji-related topics
- List of international rankings
- Member state of the United Nations
- Outline of geography
- Outline of Oceania

Fiji Hindi language
