= Telephone numbers in Fiji =

Location
- Country: Fiji
- Continent: Oceania
- Type: Closed
- NSN length: seven digits

Access codes
- Country code: +679
- International access: 00 or 052
- Long-distance: None

In Fiji, the country calling code is +679 while the International call prefix can be 00 or 052 depending on the company.

== Number allocations in Fiji ==
List of number allocations
Network	Dialling format pre-2002 (six digits)	New dialling format (seven digits)	Usage
Fixed	2XXXXX	32X XXXX	Suva City CBD area
Fixed	3XXXXX	33X XXXX	
Fixed	3XXXXX	332 XXXX	Tamavua, Namadi Heights areas
Fixed	3XXXXX	333 XXXX	Suva City CBD and surrounding areas
Fixed	3XXXXX	334 XXXX	Nasinu, Laucala Beach, Caubati, Kinoya, Nadera, Valelevu, Nadawa, Nepani, Nasole, Kalabu, Laqere, Makoi, Narere areas
Fixed	3XXXXX	336 XXXX	Delainavesi, Lami and nearby areas
Fixed	3XXXXX	338 XXXX	Samabula, Raiwai, Raiwaqa, Vatuwaqa, Nabua areas
Fixed	3XXXXX	339 XXXX	Nasinu, Laucala Beach, Caubati, Kinoya, Nadera, Valelevu, Nadawa, Nepani, Nasole, Kalabu, Laqere, Makoi, Narere areas
Fixed	4XXXXX	34X XXXX	Suva/Nausori/Korovou (Tailevu)/Lami/Navua/Deuba/Pacific Harbour [3X]
Fixed	--	35X XXXX	Central Eastern Division
Fixed	--	36X XXXX	Central Eastern Division
Fixed	--	37X XXXX	Central Eastern Division
Fixed	--	38X XXXX	Central Division – Suva
Fixed	--	400 XXXX	
Fixed	--	60X XXXX	Lau Group of Islands
Fixed	--	62X XXXX	Western Division
Fixed	--	63X XXXX	Western Division
Fixed	5XXXXX	65X XXXX	Coral Coast/Sigatoka
Fixed	6XXXXX	66X XXXX	Lautoka/Ba/Vatukoula/Tavua/Rakiraki
Fixed	7XXXXX	67X XXXX	Nadi
Fixed	--	82X XXXX	Northern Division
Mobile	--	83X XXXX	
Mobile	--	84X XXXX	
Fixed	--	85X XXXX	Northern Division
Mobile	--	86X XXXX	
Mobile	--	87X XXXX	
Fixed	8XXXXX	88X XXXX	Vanua Levu (Labasa/Savusavu/Nabouwalu/Taveuni)/Laucala Island/Lau Group of Islands
Mobile	--	70X XXXX	Digicel Fiji (new operator)
Mobile	--	71X XXXX	Digicel Fiji (new operator)
Mobile	--	72X XXXX	Digicel Fiji (new operator)
Mobile	--	73X XXXX	Digicel Fiji (new operator)
Mobile	--	74X XXXX	Digicel Fiji (new operator)
Mobile	--	75X XXXX	
Mobile	--	76X XXXX	
Mobile	--	77X XXXX	
Mobile	--	50X XXXX	Digicel Fiji (new operator)
Mobile	--	51X XXXX	Digicel Fiji (new operator)
Mobile	--	–80XXXXX –83XXXXX –86XXXXX –89XXXXX –90XXXXX –91XXXXX –92XXXXX –93XXXXX –94XXXXX –97XXXXX –99XXXXX –58XXXXX (Data sim) -27XXXXX -28XXXXX -29XXXXX	Vodafone Fiji
Mobile	--	–84XXXXX –87XXXXX –95XXXXX –96XXXXX –98XXXXX -20XXXXX -21XXXXX -22XXXXX	Inkk Mobile

Fiji has no area codes and no leading trunk "0". The first digit of the number indicates usage or location.

All telephone numbers are seven digits long. Mobile telephones are also seven digits long and begin with a 7, 9, 8, or 2.

The international access code is 00 or 052 depending on which company the call is routed through: 00 for FINTEL and 052 for Telecom Fiji.

== See also ==
- Telecommunications in Fiji
