= Kings Road (Fiji) =

Major road in Viti Levu, Fiji

- Gaunisala ni Tui (Fijian)
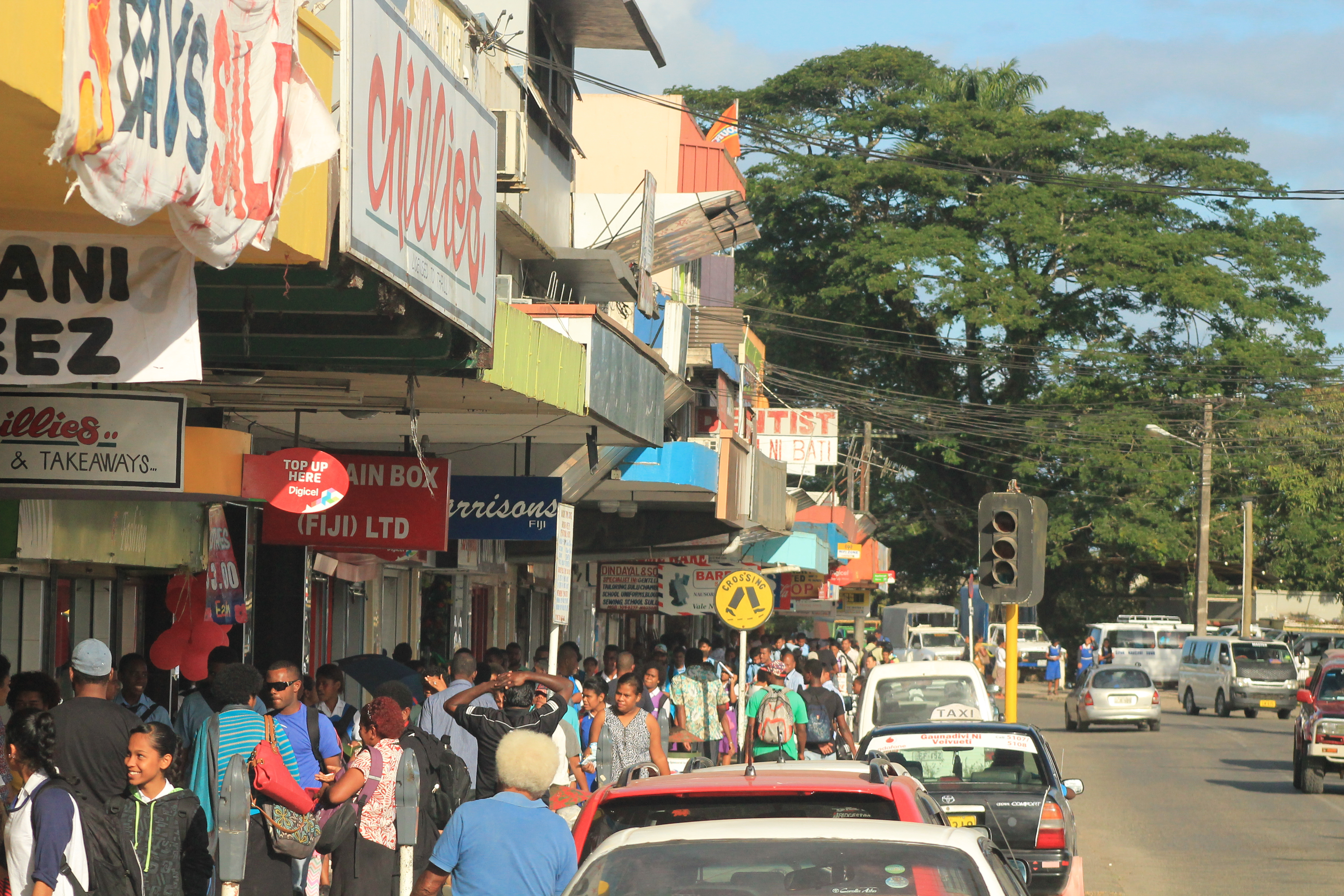
- Kings Road at Nausori

Route information
- Length: 265 km (165 mi)
- Existed: 1910s or 1920s–present

Location
- Regions: Central Division, Western Division

Kings Road (Note: also known as the Kings Highway) (Note: Fijian language: Gaunisala ni Tui (Kings Road)(Kings Highway)) is a major road located in the country of Fiji on the island of Viti Levu. It follows some coastal parts of Fiji and going through some central parts of Fiji. The road was completely sealed in mid-2012 after years of just being a gravel road. It has a 4-lane dual carriageway within the highly urbanized greater Suva metropolitan area, which was completed on 5 September 2019. It is Fiji's longest road, with a length of 265 km (165 mi) from Suva to Lautoka, with Queens Road spanning 221 km (137 mi) in length coming second. It is the major road of Viti Levu alongside Queens Road.

== Route description ==
=== Suva ===
The road starts at a Roundabout connecting Ratu Dovi Road, Golf Link Road, and Mead Road in the urbanized greater Suva metropolitan area near a Avis Car Rental and a Toyota Dealership. The road meets its first intersection with Sukanalvalu Road, and a second intersection with Lady Maraia Road. Right near these two intersections, there is a pedestrian crossing with traffic lights. It meets the intersection for Whippy Street and Cunningham Road at a Dairy factory which then Kings Road goes over the Samambulla River which then goes past the Water Authority of Fiji building and near a hardware store just before intersecting with Ratu Dovi Road at a set of traffic lights. It goes through a few intersections and buildings like the World Harvest Centre which then goes onto a small roundabout a few meters ahead. It goes through more intersections with traffic lights which goes on a bridge and goes onto another roundabout before leaving Suva and goes into Nakasi and going past a few buildings and intersections before leaving Nakasi and going on a roundabout.

=== Central Division ===
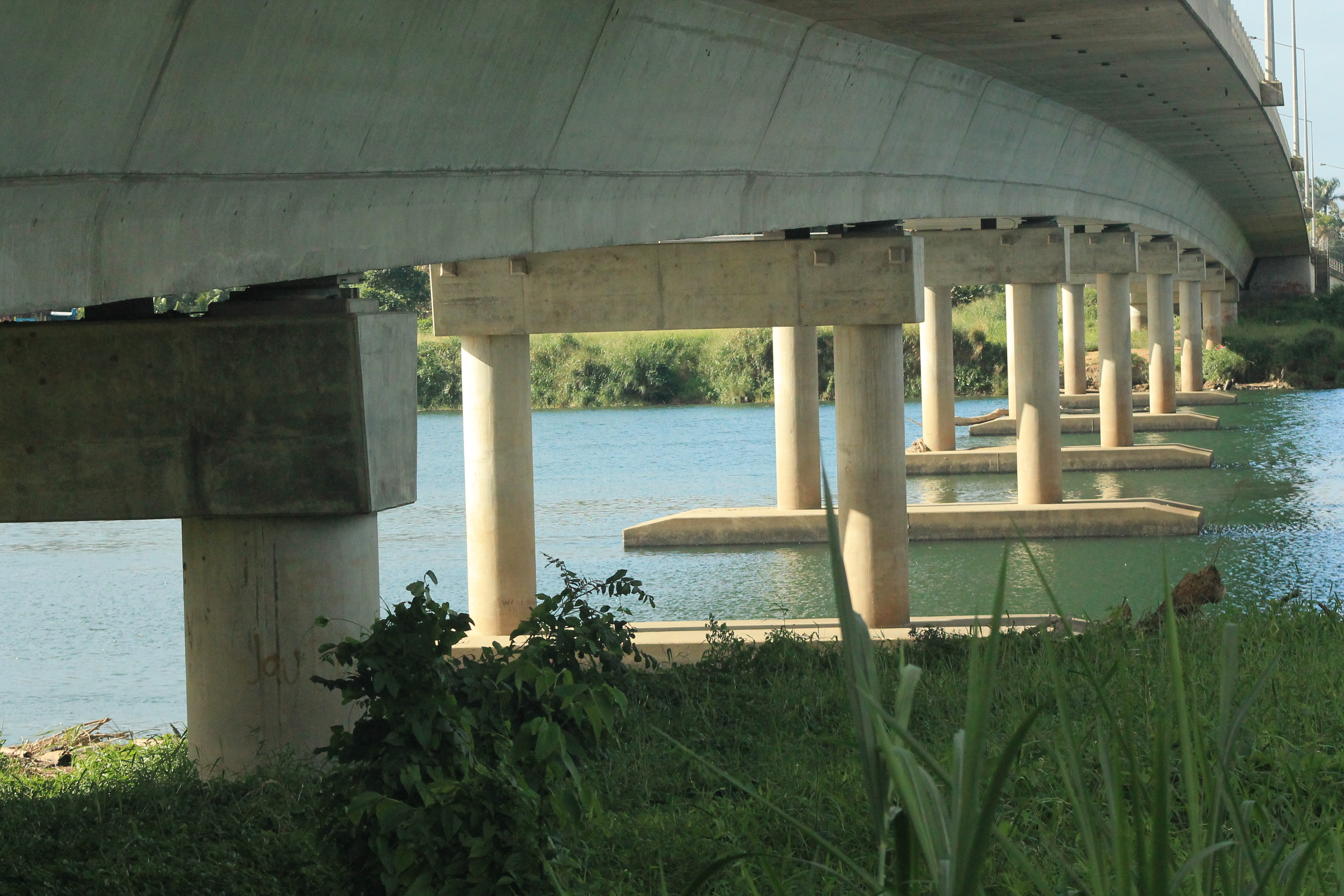
The Rewa Bridge that Kings Road goes onto

The road goes over the Rewa River on the Rewa Bridge after going onto a roundabout. It goes through Nausori before going onto a roundabout which then goes onto another roundabout and then another roundabout and then another roundabout throughout the town centre.

The road goes near the Rewa River and near Kasavu. It then practically goes onto cruvey sections of Kings Road to Logani and passing through multiple houses and bushes while going through Visa, Natobuniqio, Wainisikia, Naimasimasi, and Waidalice before going on a bridge to Veinuqa, Nakalawaca, and Korovou which then goes through the town centre and over a bridge which then goes onto a roundabout and meets a few intersections and then leaves to be a cruvey road again. Kings Road goes through remote locations in the bushes and remaining as a cruvey road while going through craved out hills for the road to go through. It then goes to Drekeniwai, Naqia, Wailevu which then goes through the Western Division but keeps returning into the Central Division before staying in the Western Division for its entire route.

=== Western Division ===
It goes to Nailaga, Nabulini, Nalalawa, and Dama. It goes through multiple settlements near the coastal shore of the Fiji island Viti Levu. It enters Tavua and Ba. It then goes through or past a few more settlements before ending in Lautoka on Queens Road at a roundabout.

== History ==
The road was carved out in the 1910s and 1920s under British colonial administration. It was built to open up the northern and eastern districts of Viti Levu for commercial agriculture, specifically sugarcane farming and trade. Before the road was built, moving crops from rural northern plantations to coastal ports or mills like those in Ba was an incredibly slow trip and an isolated process. Early stretches were built on the grueling physical labor of local workers who carved out the mountain foundations.

Before the 1960s and 1970s, travelers could not drive all the way around the northern part of the island. The route has a missing link between Korovou and Rakiraki. It was cleared and connected in the 1960s and early 1970s. This allowed vehicular traffic to circle entirely around Viti Levu.

=== Sealing ===
Before the 1990s and 2000s, the road previously had rugged and had unpredictable potholes, narrow sections, and unsafe river crossings. In mid-2012, the road was paved in the final 17.5-kilometre unsealed bottleneck in the Tailevu Province, officially making the entire road fully sealed.

== Upgrades ==
As of the 1990s and 2000s, there has been plans to upgrade and fix Kings Road as of fully sealing it in 2012, and fixing other issues that the road has. In August 2006, the old Rewa Bridge was replaced, and was made into a four-lane concrete girder bridge over the Rewa River. The bridge was funded by a partnership between the European Union and the government of Fiji and was constructed by Fletcher Construction for the government of Fiji between October 2003 and August 2006 for a cost of FJ$29.7 million.

Construction for a dual carriageway between Nakasi to the urbanized greater Suva metropolitan area started in 2015 under the original contractor, China Railway First Group (CRFG). However, due to severe and unacceptable project delays that left the commuter corridor heavily disrupted, the Fiji Roads Authority officially declined CRFG's contract on 12 October 2018. The project resumed about 8 or 9 days later after Fiji Roads Authority declined CRFG'S contract. The site operated a 24 hour schedule to complete the remaining roadwork sites adding drainage systems, paving, and adding traffic lights at intersections before opening the 4-lane dual carriageway on 5 September 2019.
