= BlueSky Fiji =

Annual music festival in Fiji

BlueSky Fiji is an annual international R18 music festival held in Fiji. Bluesky Fiji was founded in 2012 (14 years ago) and is known for pioneering international music festivals in Fiji. The festival has helped establish other international music festivals in Fiji including Spring Break Fiji.

== History ==
BlueSky Fiji was established in 2012 by Tourism HQ. It originally took place at Sonaisali Island Resort, but in 2015 the festival moved to Mana Island, Fiji.

== Lineups ==
=== 2012 ===
(October 5th to 8th, Sonaisali Island)

- Tiki Taane, Dick Johnson, State of Mind, Dan Aux, Sam Hill, Tim Phin, MayaVanya, Nick D, Dean Campbell, Thane Kirby, Kara Rickard, Bulletproof, General Lee, Murry Sweetpants, Peter Urlich, and Karn Hall.

=== 2013 ===
(November 16th to 19th, Sonaisali Island)

- Tiki Taane, Peacekeepers aka Sambora and P-Digsss, Peking Duk, Tom Piper, Motez (producer), Danny T, LDRU, Yahtzel, Dan Aux, Ember, General Lee, Karn Hall, Daniel Farley, Aroha, Thane Kirby, Benson, Mike Metro, Bevan Keys, Beat Mafia, Cam Robertson, and MurrySweetpants.

=== 2014 ===
(October 24th to 27th, Sonaisali Island)

- P-Money, Tali P Digsss, Dick Johnson, Clarke Gayford, Aroha, Dan Aux, Tim Phin, Karn Hall, Sam Hill, Thane Kirby, and Sweetpants.

=== 2015 ===
(November 8th to 11th, Mana Island)

- P-Money, Ladi6, Tiki Taane, P Digsss, Thane Kirby, Laughton Kora, Dick Johnson, Peter Urlich, Aroha and Tali, Dan Aux, Tim Phin, Karn Hall, Mike Ross, Sam Hill and Hamish Crocker, General Lee, Mayavanya, MurrySweetpants, Zeisha Fremaux, Knox (Fiji) and Billy & The Kids (Fiji)

=== 2016 ===
(November 6th to 9th, Mana Island)

- P-Money, Tiki Taane, Hollie Smith, P Digsss, Laughton Kora, Knox (Fiji), Aroha, Tali, Kings, Dick Johnson, Tim Phin, Karn Hall, Dj Lucas, General Lee, Thane Kirby, Tim Lambourne, Eastern Bloc, Logg Cabin, Chiccoreli, Hamish Crocker, Sam Hill, Sweetpants and Billy & The Kids (Fiji).

== See also ==
- List of festivals in Fiji
- George FM
