= Harvest Radio (Fiji) =

Suva, Navua and Nausori; Fiji
- Frequency: 89.8 MHz

Programming
- Format: Christian

Ownership
- Owner: Christian Mission Fellowship International

History
- First air date: 2015

Links
- Webcast: http://whbn.info/livestream/
- Website: http://whbn.info/harvest-radio/

Harvest Radio is an English and iTaukei language Christian radio station in Fiji.The station broadcasts on the 89.8Mhz to the cities of Suva, Navua and Nausori. The station also broadcasts online.

It is operated by Christian Mission Fellowship, Fiji.
