= Suva-Nausori corridor =

- Conurbation
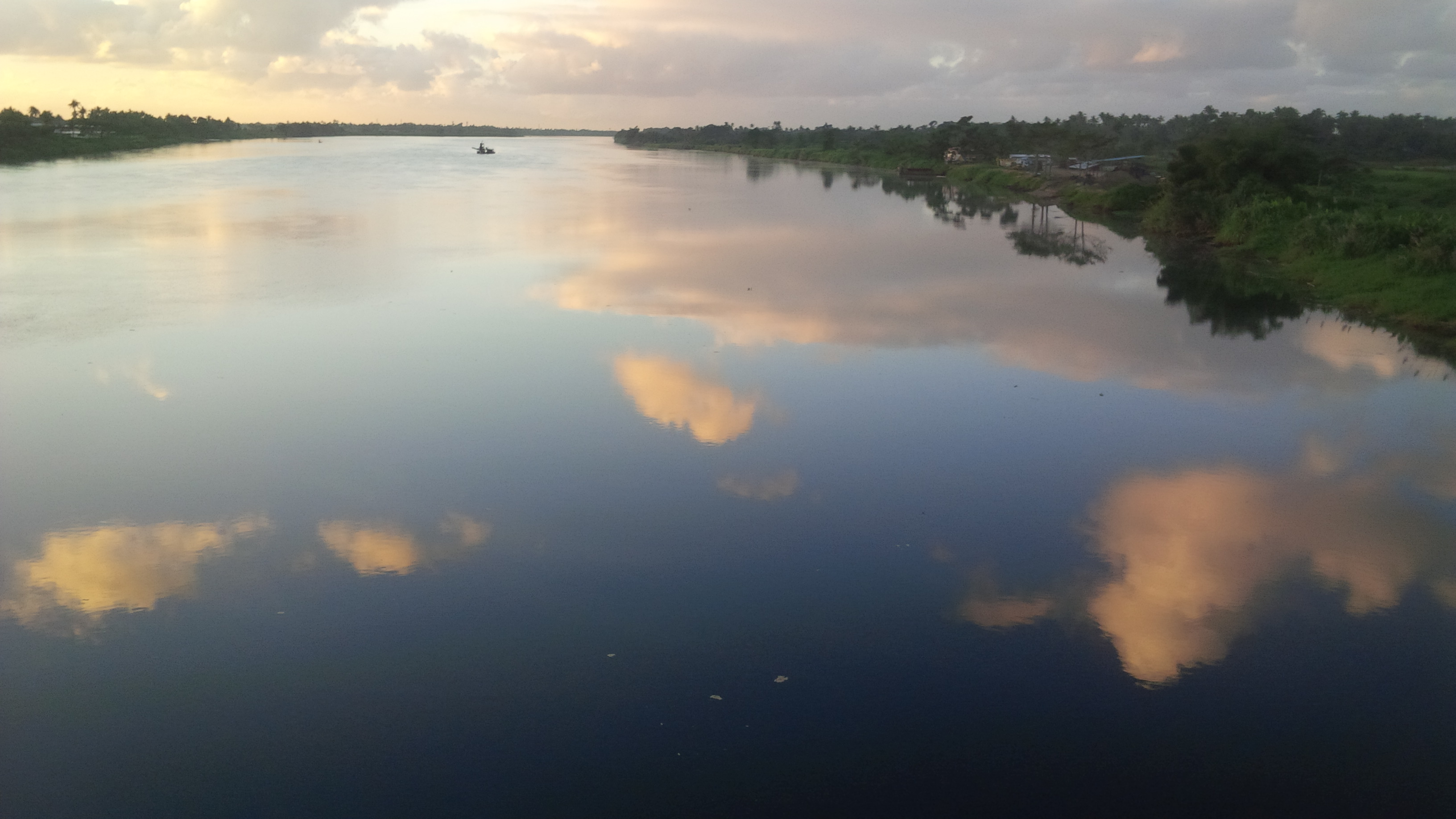
- Rewa River from the New Rewa Bridge
- Interactive map of Suva-Nausori corridor
- Country: Fiji
- Division: Central
- Province: Rewa
- Municipalities: Nasinu; Nausori; Suva

The Suva-Nausori corridor is a conurbation in Fiji that is made up of 3 municipalities of Suva, Nasinu and Nausori. It includes the settlements of Lami and Nakasi. The Suva-Nausori corridor hosts two roads – Kings Road is the main road and Ratu Dovi Road which travels from Suva to Laqere. The poles of the Suva-Nausori corridor are Suva and Nausori and they are about 19 km apart.

In 2011, the Suva-Nausori corridor became the first region of Fiji to introduce water fluoridation.
