= Jainan Prasad =

Hindi Poet

Jainan Prasad was born in Nakasi, Fiji and is one of the young Hindi poets of Fiji. He has been a career civil servant, worked at the University of the South Pacific and served with the United Nations Children’s Fund (UNICEF).

He is the President of Hindi Writers Forum Fiji (Hindi Lekhak Sangh Fiji) and Assistant Secretary of Hindi Parishad Fiji. He has also been an Executive of Shree Sanatan Dharm Partinidhi Sabha Fiji and well known for his musical talents and social work. He is very popular on Ramayana discourse.

Prasad has made a contribution to Hindi literature in Fiji which is outside his profession. His first publication was titled Gurudaksina that attracted wider attention of scholars and enthusiasts. His second publication named Janam Ek Ehsaas was targeted mainly for youngsters. His third publication Gudgudi, is Hasye-Vyang Kavita that uses sharp cutting remarks or language intended to mock, wound or even infer to contempt or ridicule, generally meaning the opposite to what the statement really is.

In 2008, Jainan Prasad had also been a Translator Consultant for United Nations Development Fund (UNDP) and had Translated extensive documents from English to Hindi on National Initiative on Civic Education (NICE).
