= List of cities and towns in Fiji =

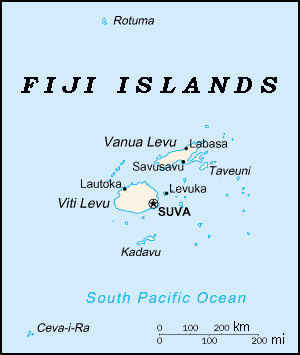
Map of Fiji

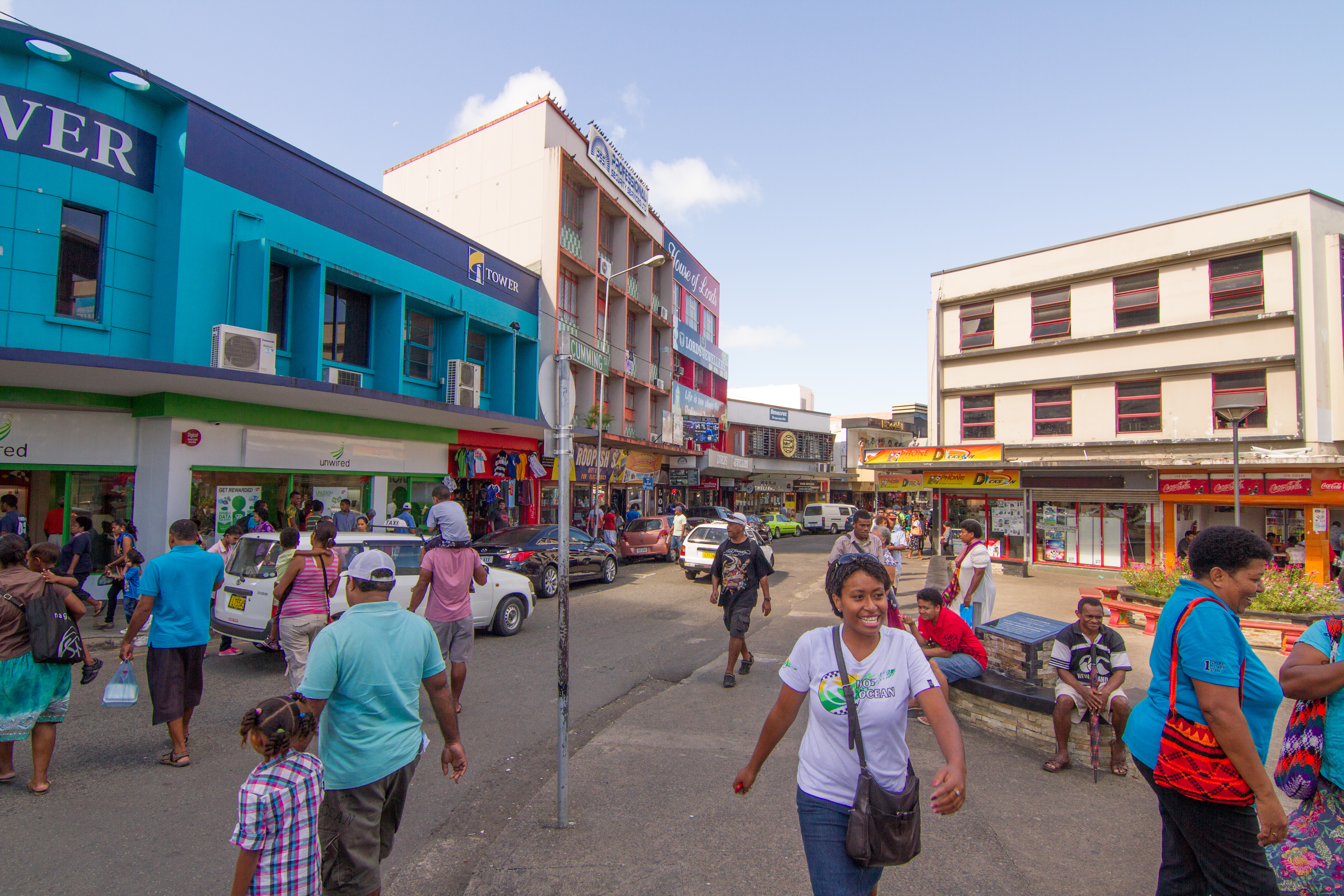
Suva, Capital of Fiji

This is a list of cities and towns in Fiji.

== List ==
This list shows the population of the top 10 cities/towns in Fiji by population. Suva, the capital, is the most populous urban place in the country, with a population of 101,166 as of 2025. The 10 largest urban areas are listed in the table and other areas can be found below this table.

Rank	City or Town	Population (2017)
1	Suva	93,874
2	Nasinu	92,046
3	Lautoka	71,573
4	Nadi	70,533
5	Nausori	57,866
6	Labasa	26,601
7	Lami	24,637
8	Ba	15,846
9	Sigatoka	10,509
10	Tavua	8,810

== Cities ==
- Suva
- Lautoka

== Incorporated towns ==
Fijian law defines "towns" as urbanized areas incorporated as municipal bodies, governed by Town Councils.

- Ba
- Labasa
- Lami
- Levuka
- Nadi
- Nasinu
- Nausori
- Rakiraki
- Savusavu
- Sigatoka
- Tavua

== Unincorporated towns ==
The following localities are urbanized, but have not been municipally organized. They are urban areas for statistical purposes.

- Korovou
- Matei
- Nabouwalu
- Naqara
- Navua
- Pacific Harbour
- Seaqaqa
- Vatukoula

== See also ==
- Nakasi, a suburb in the Suva-Nausori corridor
