= Telecommunications in Fiji =

Telecommunications in Fiji include radio, television, fixed and mobile telephones, and the Internet.

== Radio and television ==
- Radio stations:
  - state-owned commercial company, Fiji Broadcasting Corporation, operates 6 radio stations - 2 public broadcasters and 4 commercial broadcasters with multiple repeaters; 5 radio stations with repeaters operated by Communications Fiji, Ltd; transmissions of multiple international broadcasters are available (2009);
  - 13 AM, 40 FM, and no shortwave stations (1998).
- Radios: 500,000 (1997).
- Television stations:
  - Fiji TV, a publicly traded company on the South Pacific Stock Exchange, operates a free to air channel ever since its inception in 1994.
  - 2 terrestrial stations (1998).
- Television sets: 21,000 (1997).

Radio is a key source of information, particularly on the outer islands. There are publicly and privately owned stations. State-owned Fiji Broadcasting Corporation operates Fijian-language Radio Fiji One, Hindi-language Radio Fiji Two, music-based Bula FM, Hindi station Mirchi FM, and music-based 2day FM.

Communications Fiji Limited, a public listed company on the South Pacific Stock Exchange was established in 1996 and is located in 231 Waimanu Road, Suva. It broadcasts English speaking stations FM96 and LegendFM on 96.2FM and 98.6FM respectively, Fijian language station, VitiFM, Navtarang and Radio Sargam - Hindi speaking stations. The BBC World Service broadcasts on 88.2 FM in the capital, Suva.

=== Media control ===
Under the military government's Media Decree, the directors and 90 percent of the shareholders of locally based media must be citizens of, and permanently reside in Fiji. The Media Industry Development Authority of Fiji is responsible for enforcing these provisions. The authority has the power to investigate journalists and media outlets for alleged violations of the decree, including powers of search and seizure of equipment.

A code of ethics contained in the Media Decree requires that all stories run by the media be balanced, with comment obtained from both sides where there is any disagreement on the facts. This requirement enables government departments and private businesses to prevent stories from being published by not responding to media questions, thus making it impossible for the media to fulfill the decree's requirement for comment from both sides. However, media sources report that if the story is positive toward the government, the balance requirement could be ignored without consequence.

== Telephones ==
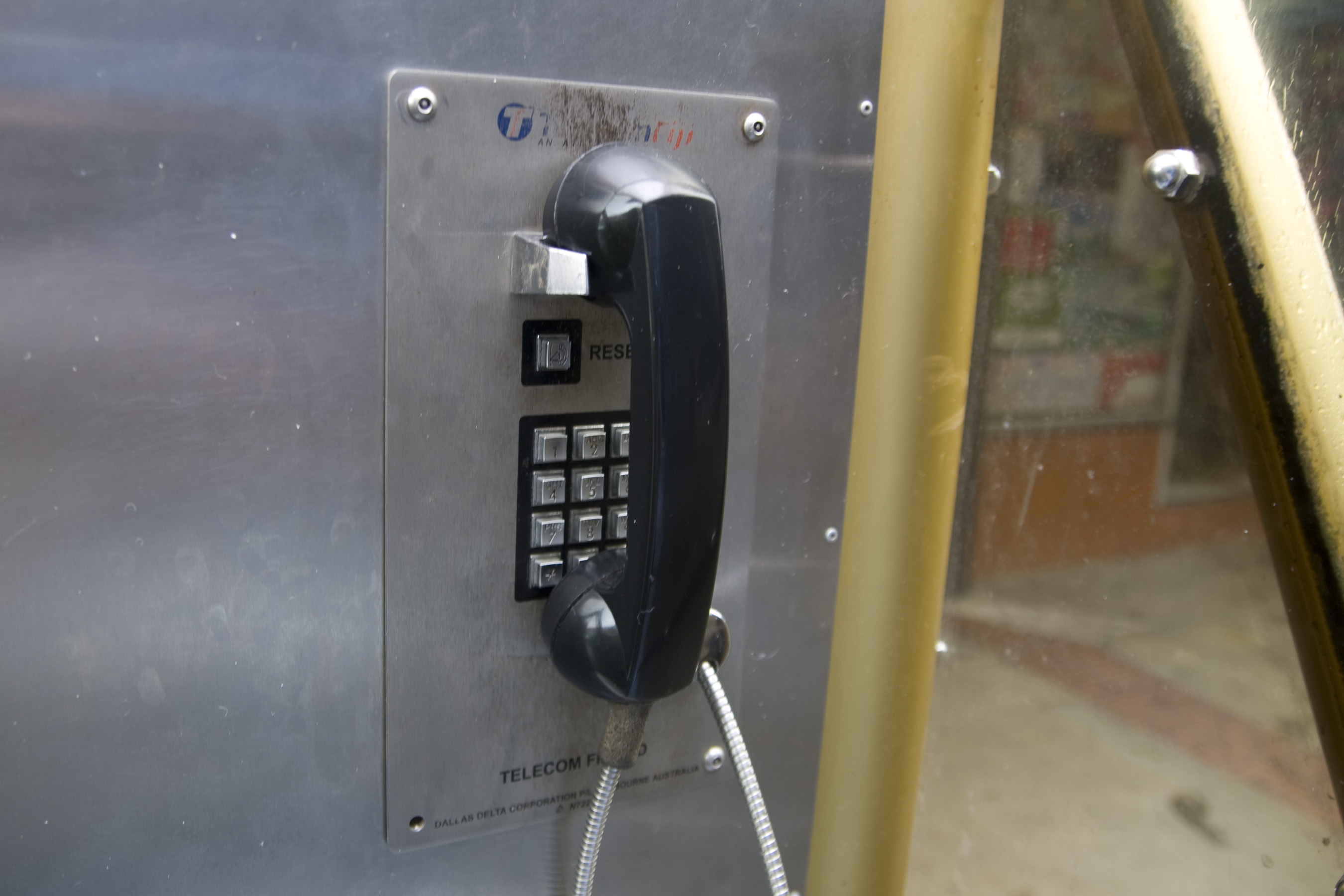
A public payphone in Fiji, c. 2010

- Calling code: +679
- International call prefix: 00 or 052
- Main lines:
  - 88,400 lines in use, 147th in the world (2012);
  - 112,500 lines in use (2005).
- Mobile cellular:
  - 858,800 lines, 159th in the world (2012);
  - 315,000 lines (2007).
- Telephone system: modern local, interisland, and international (wire/radio integrated) public and special-purpose telephone, telegraph, and teleprinter facilities; regional radio communications center; telephone or radio telephone links to almost all inhabited islands; most towns and large villages have automatic telephone exchanges and direct dialing; combined fixed and mobile-cellular teledensity roughly 100 per 100 persons (2011).
- Communications cables: Southern Cross Cable, links to the United States, Canada, New Zealand, and Australia; Vanuatu-Fiji Interchange Cable (2014); Tonga-Fiji cable.
- Satellite earth station: 2 Inmarsat (Pacific Ocean) (2011).

== Internet ==
- Top-level domain: .fj
- Internet users:
  - 300,326 users, 140th in the world; 33.7% of the population, 126th in the world (2012);
  - 114,200 users, 157th in the world (2009).
- Fixed broadband: 13,734 subscriptions, 142nd in the world; 1.5% of the population, 133rd in the world (2012).
- Wireless broadband: 96,277 subscriptions, 118th in the world; 10.8% of the population, 89th in the world (2012).
- Internet hosts: 21,739 hosts, 115th in the world (2012).
- IPv4: 134,656 addresses allocated, less than 0.05% of the world total, 151.3 addresses per 1000 people (2012).
- Internet service providers: 7 ISPs (2011)

The Internet is widely available and used in and around urban centers, but its availability and use are minimal or nonexistent outside these areas.

=== Labasa-Savusavu Fiber Project ===
Launched in 2023, Telecom Fiji's $4.1 million Fiber Project is designed to expand the underground fiber optic network from Labasa to Savusavu, with the aim of improving internet services in Fiji's Northern regions.

The project's significance lies in its potential to address the limitations of the existing microwave link-based connectivity in Vanua Levu, which is vulnerable to disruptions, particularly during natural disasters. By reinforcing the communications network with fiber optic technology, the initiative is expected to contribute to the resilience and economic development of the Northern Division. This development is also anticipated to support the advancement of digital education infrastructure and broader economic activities in the region.

=== Internet censorship and surveillance ===
The government in a parliament sitting on March 15, 2018, passed a bill known as the Online Safety Bill to the Standing Committee on Justice, Law and Human Rights that was tabled in the Parliament of Fiji to enforce tougher restrictions on those that may share explicit photos of individuals on social media or spread anti- government remarks as well.

Currently, there are no government restrictions on general public access to the Internet, but evidence suggests that the government monitors private e-mails of citizens as well as Internet traffic in an attempt to control antigovernment reports by anonymous bloggers.

The country has operated under a military-led government since 2006 and has had no constitution or functioning parliament since 2009. A series of decrees have been issued, including the Public Order Amendment Decree (POAD), the Media Decree, and the Crime Decree.

By decree all telephone and Internet service users must register their personal details with telephone and Internet providers, including their name, birth date, home address, left thumbprint, and photographic identification. The decree imposes fines of up to F$100,000 ($56,721) on providers who continue to provide services to unregistered users and up to F$10,000 ($5,672) on users who do not update their registration information as required. Vodafone, one of two mobile telephone providers, also requires users to register their nationality, postal address, employment details, and both thumbprints.

The POAD gives the government the power to detain persons on suspicion of "endangering public safety or the preservation of the peace"; defines terrorism as any act designed to advance a political, religious, or ideological cause that could "reasonably be regarded" as intended to compel a government to do or refrain from doing any act or to intimidate the public or a section thereof; and makes religious vilification and attempts to sabotage or undermine the economy offenses punishable by a maximum F$10,000 ($5,672) fine or five years’ imprisonment. The Media Decree prohibits "irresponsible reporting" and provides for government censorship of the media. The Crimes Decree includes criticism of the government in its definition of the crime of sedition, including statements made in other countries by any person, who can be prosecuted on return to Fiji. The government uses the threat of prosecution under these provisions to intimidate government critics and limit public criticism of the government. Journalists and media organizations practice varying degrees of self-censorship, with many reportedly fearing retribution if they criticize the government.

In May 2007 it was reported that the military in Fiji had blocked access to blogs critical of the regime.

In 2012 police investigated former University of the South Pacific (USP) professor Wadan Narsey, a prominent Fijian economist and long-time critic of the military government, for alleged sedition in writings published on his personal blog.

The POAD permits military personnel to search persons and premises without a warrant from a court and to take photographs, fingerprints, and measurements of any person. Police and military officers may enter private premises to break up any meeting considered unlawful.
