= University of Fiji =

University in Lautoka, Fiji

Coordinates: 17°40′7.35″S 177°24′28.87″E

The University of Fiji
- Motto: Flexible, Innovative, Affordable, Contemporary, Futuristic
- Type: Private
- Established: December 2004; 21 years ago
- Chancellor: Epeli Nailatikau
- Vice-Chancellor: Professor Sushila Chang
- Location: Lautoka, Fiji
- Website: www.unifiji.ac.fj/

The University of Fiji is a university based in Saweni, Lautoka, Fiji. It was established in December 2004 under academic leadership of the Fiji Institute of Applied Studies and financial sponsorship of the Arya Pratinidhi Sabha of Fiji, a Hindu religious organization dedicated to education." On 14 February 2016, the Native Lands Trust Board (NLTB) signed a 99-year lease with the university for the 5-hectare property, for which the university paid F$100,000. The university agreed in return to provide two scholarships annually for the children of landowners.

The University of Fiji honoured its first graduates in 2008. Fiji's President Ratu Josefa Iloilovatu, who is also the University's Chancellor, spoke at the graduation ceremony, and commended the university for making it compulsory for all students to follow basic courses in Fijian and Hindi: “Our future depends on our ability and desire to understand each other better, to communicate with each other better, and to assist each other. Being able to communicate in each other’s language is vital for this.” Fijian is the language of the country's majority ethnic group, while Hindi is the main language of the largest ethnic minority.

== Courses and departments ==
The university offers courses up to postgraduate level in the following fields: Accounting, Economics, Management, Computing Science, Information Technology, Mathematics, Language and Literature, Fijian Language and Culture, Medicine, Law, and Hindi Language and Culture.

It includes six "Centres of Excellence", namely a Centre for Indigenous Studies (CIS), a Centre for International and Regional Affairs (CIRA), the Gandhi-Tappoo Centre for Writing, Ethics and Peace Studies (WEPS), a Centre for Diasporic Studies (CDS), a Centre for Gender Research (CGR), and a Centre for Energy, Environment and Sustainable Development.

== University finance and administration ==
The university is governed by the University of Fiji Council. In addition to the Arya Pratinidhi Sabha, stakeholders include the Shri Sanatan Dharam, the Fiji Muslim League, the Gujarat Education Society, the Sikh Education Society, the Andhra Sangam, the TISI Sangam, the Kabir Path Sabha, and the Fiji Teachers Union. The university has also invited the University of the South Pacific, the Fiji Council of Churches, the Methodist Church of Fiji and Rotuma, the Roman Catholic Church in Fiji, the Fiji Girmit Centre, the Great Council of Chiefs, the Ba Provincial Council, the Fijian Teachers Association, and the Ministry of Education to appoint representatives to the Council.

Benefactors include the India-Fiji Festival Committee, which on 16 February 2006 donated F$10,000 to the university for the tertiary education of underprivileged students.

The University of Fiji has signed a Memorandum of Understanding with Australia's University of Canberra to foster collaboration in research and facilitate exchanges of staff and students. Vice-Chancellor Rajesh Chandra said on 26 May 2005 that the agreement would effectively link the University of Fiji with international academic networks and would help ensure the quality of instruction.

== Future plans and goals ==
The Fiji Times quoted Professor Chandra on 16 February 2006 as saying that making higher education available to underprivileged communities would lead to equitable development, which would foster social and political stability in the long run.

Professor Chandra announced plans on 6 March to establish a medical school, and said that if donors could be found, the university would set up another campus in the northern island of Vanua Levu. The medical school, to be called the Dr Umanand Prasad School of Medicine, is the brainchild of Dr. Umanand Prasad, a native of Labasa who has invested F$1 million for a medical school in his home country, after thirty years abroad. It has been operational since March 2008.
