= Bhawani Dayal Arya College =

Coordinates: 18.0631°S 178.5162°E

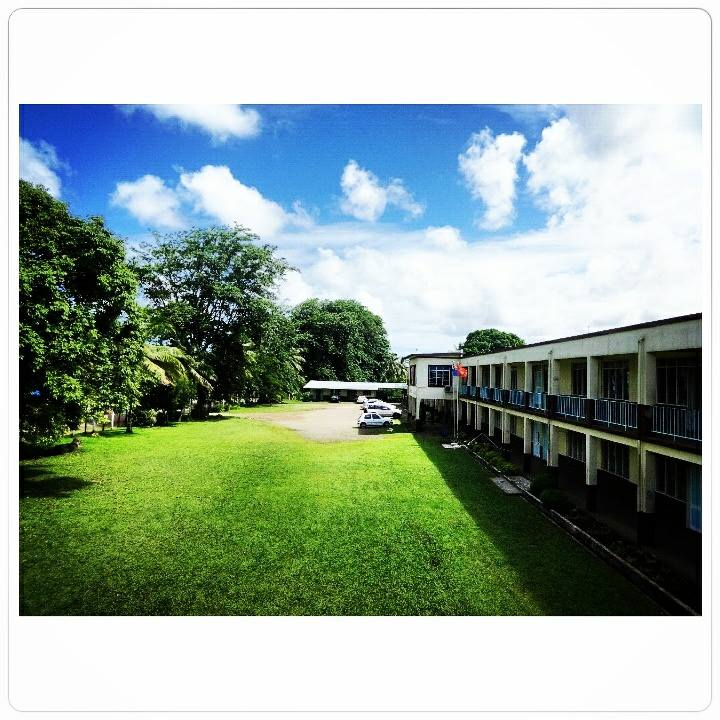
- Nakasi, Nausori; Fiji

Information
- Type: Private
- Motto: Knowledge Is Power
- Established: 1972
- Principal: Ms Ranjeeta Devi Kumar
- Staff: 51
- Grades: Year 9 - 13
- Enrollment: 856
- Affiliation: Arya Pratinidhi Sabha of Fiji

Bhawani Dayal Arya College (Bhawani Dayal High School until 1997) is a secondary school in Nakasi, Fiji. It is oriented to Hindu religious teachings as interpreted by the Arya Samaj movement.

== History ==
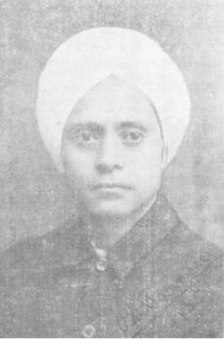
Bhawani Dayal Sanyasi

Bhawani Dayal High School was established in 1972 and named after Bhawani Dayal Sannyasi (1892–1950), an activist for the rights of Indians and promoter of Vedic religion in South Africa. The school was renamed Bhawani Dayal Arya College in 1997, the year in which it commemorated 25 years since its founding.

The school started with 28 students and 2 teachers in a temporary building. Purpose-built premises were completed in 1976 by which time the school had 388 students and 17 teachers. Student numbers had risen to exceed 800 by 2018 with over 50 teaching staff.

The school premises have seen several expansions including a canteen in 1980, a multi-craft workshop in 1982, the two-storey southern wing of classrooms in 1983, a multi-craft workshop in 1982 and an additional classroom in 1988. In 1990 the Industrial Arts Workshop was constructed and 5 classrooms were added in 1993.

The school started offering Form 6 (Year 12) education in 1989 and Form 7 (Year 13) in 1993. It is governed by the Arya Pratinidhi Sabha of Fiji.
