= Television in Fiji =

Television was introduced to Fiji in 1991 at an experimental level, becoming regular in 1994. There are three terrestrial television companies, Fiji Television, Fiji Broadcasting Corporation and Mai TV. Sky Pacific is the only pay-TV operator available.

== History ==
The first television sets were imported into Fiji in 1959. Fiji Trading Co. Ltd. of Suva became the first company in Fiji to import and exhibit a television set for demonstrative purposes. Manager Tom French said that if proper distant reception of television stations from Sydney and Melbourne was received successfully, sales of television sets would become lucrative.

The Fijian government had shown varying levels of deliberation before introducing a television service. It wasn't until the late 1960s when a feasibility study about the future of Fijian radio led to the creation of a possible television station, which would fall under the auspices of the Fiji Broadcasting Commission, with an estimated coverage of 75% of the national population. In 1984, the government set up the Fiji National Video Centre (FNVC) in association with the German Hanns Seidel Foundation. That same year, the government accepted an offer from Kerry Packer's PBL to conduct a feasibility study for a television service in the country, by 1987 at earliest. An agreement was settled between PBL and the Fijian government in August 1986. There already was an October 1987 launch target, with plans to reduce the Nine Network-backed monopoly within five to seven years. Equipment built in Australia, such as an OB van, was scheduled to be delivered by July. However 20% of its programming was going to be local.

Following the coups of 1987, PBL suspended its financing to the Fiji Television Corporation, due to the downturn caused to the economy by the effects of the coups. With Fiji experiencing rapid economic recovery in the aftermath, new proposals were being set up in 1988, with the government owning a controlling stake in the new company.

In October 1991, the government granted Television New Zealand a temporary license to operate a television service, Fiji One Television, to carry the 1991 Rugby World Cup initially with coverage in Suva with coverage extending to Nausori and Navua its transmitter located in Tamavua in the outskirts of Suva. In December 1991, following positive interest in the Suva area, the coverage area was extended to the whole of the Western Division, with transmitters installed in Tualesia (southeast of Lautoka) and the Sabeto Range providing signals to Lautoka, Nadi and their surrounding areas.

Eyeing the creation of a permanent service, the government and TVNZ signed a Memorandum of Understanding. When the company was scheduled to go permanent, TVNZ would manage the service and use the resources of the FNVC using the existing Fiji One service. TVNZ was only involved in the service on a "contractual basis", providing operational and managerial expertise until Fiji TV was set to become self-sustaining, which according to TVNZ, would take five years.

Fiji One went regular in July 1994. At the same time, it announced the implementation of a two-channel subscription television service known as Sky Fiji (later Sky Pacific). Its broadcasts started on 30 June 1996. In 1999, the service added a third. Labasa Town received a tender in 2004 from a Chinese company (from Fushun) to install a cable TV network in Vanua Levu. At the same time, Sky Fiji became Sky Pacific, a digital television services with national and international reach, covering multiple countries and jurisdictions in the Pacific area. A second company, Pacific Broadcasting Services Fiji, opened in 2005, but closed in 2012. A second television channel, Mai TV, was founded in 2006 and started broadcasts two years later.

The Fijian Broadcasting Corporation finally launched a television channel in 2010, FBC TV. It was tasked to introduce the digital terrestrial network in 2014, whose first tests began in July 2015. In 2016, the Walesi platform started broadcasting. Fiji Television and FBC were given additional channels. FBC was given LCNs 1 and 3 (FBC TV and FBC 2) and Fiji One, LCN 2. FBC launched FBC Plus and FBC 2, while Fiji TV launched Fiji Two.
