= Arya Pratinidhi Sabha of Fiji =

AUM or OM is considered by the Arya Samaj to be the highest and most proper name of God.

The Arya Pratinidhi Sabha of Fiji (Arya Representative Society) is the national body for all the Arya Samajs in Fiji. It was formed in 1918 and registered as a religious body through the efforts of Manilal Doctor, who was in Fiji from 1912 to 1920 at the behest of Mahatma Gandhi to provide legal assistance to the Fiji Indians. Its first President was Swami Manoharanand Saraswati who had arrived in Fiji, from India, in 1913. The Arya Pratinidhi Sabha of Fiji is affiliated to Sarvadeshik Arya Pratinidhi Sabha (World Council of Arya Samaj) based in New Delhi.

Immediately after its formation the Sabha went about establishing schools in Fiji, with the first one, Gyrykul Primary School, established in 1918 in Saweni, Lautoka. The Sabha owns and manages 14 pre-schools, 18 primary schools, 7 secondary schools, a commercial school, a religious training centre, a youth development centre and has provided the facilities and resources for the establishment of the University of Fiji.

== Educational institutions ==
Year Established	Institution	Location
1918	Gurukul Primary School	Lautoka
1929	Vunimono Arya School	Nausori
1930	Arya Samaj Primary School	Suva
1936	Vunikavikaloa Arya School	RakiRaki
1938	Arya Kanya Pathshala	Ba
1942	Bhawani Dayal Memorial Primary School	Nakasi
1943	Naduna Arya School	Labasa
1952	Swami Shraddhanand Memorial School	Suva
1952	DAV Girls College	Suva
1952	DAV College	Suva
1953	DAV College	Ba
1956	DAV Primary School	Ba
1962	Korotari Arya School	Labasa
1967	Wainikoro Arya School	Labasa
1970	Pt. Vishnu Deo Memorial Primary School	Suva
1972	Pt Vishnu Deo Memorial College	Lautoka
1972	Bhawani Dayal Arya College	Nakasi
1973	Labasa Arya Secondary School	Labasa
1975	Dr. Ram Lakhan Memorial Primary School	Nasinu
1980	Lautoka Arya Samaj Primary School	Lautoka
1980	Draladamu Primary School	Labasa
1981	Nadi Arya Samaj Commercial School	Nadi
1982	Vatukoula Arya Samaj Primary School	Tavua
1992	Nadi Arya Samaj Primary School	Nadi
1998	Nadroga Arya College	Sigatoka
2003	J.N. Jokhan Memorial Primary School	Navua
2003	Vedic Training Centre	Suva
2005	University of Fiji	Lautoka

== President and Secretary ==
The following is a list of the President and Secretary of the Sabha and year when they were first elected.

Year	President	Secretary
1927	Jagarnath Prasad Maharaj	R. Parmeshwar
1954	Jagarnath Prasad Maharaj	Narendra Gaji
1964	Shankar Pratap	Narendra Gaji
1965	Ram Lakhan	Narendra Gaji
1966	Saraswati Devi	R. Parmeshwar
1967	Harish Chandra Gaji	Ram Karan Cheta
1970	Ram Karan Cheta	Ravindra Pratap Singh

At present there are 11 Arya Samajs affiliated to the Sabha and its president is Kamlesh Kumar Arya.
