= Rewa River =

River in Fiji

Rewa river
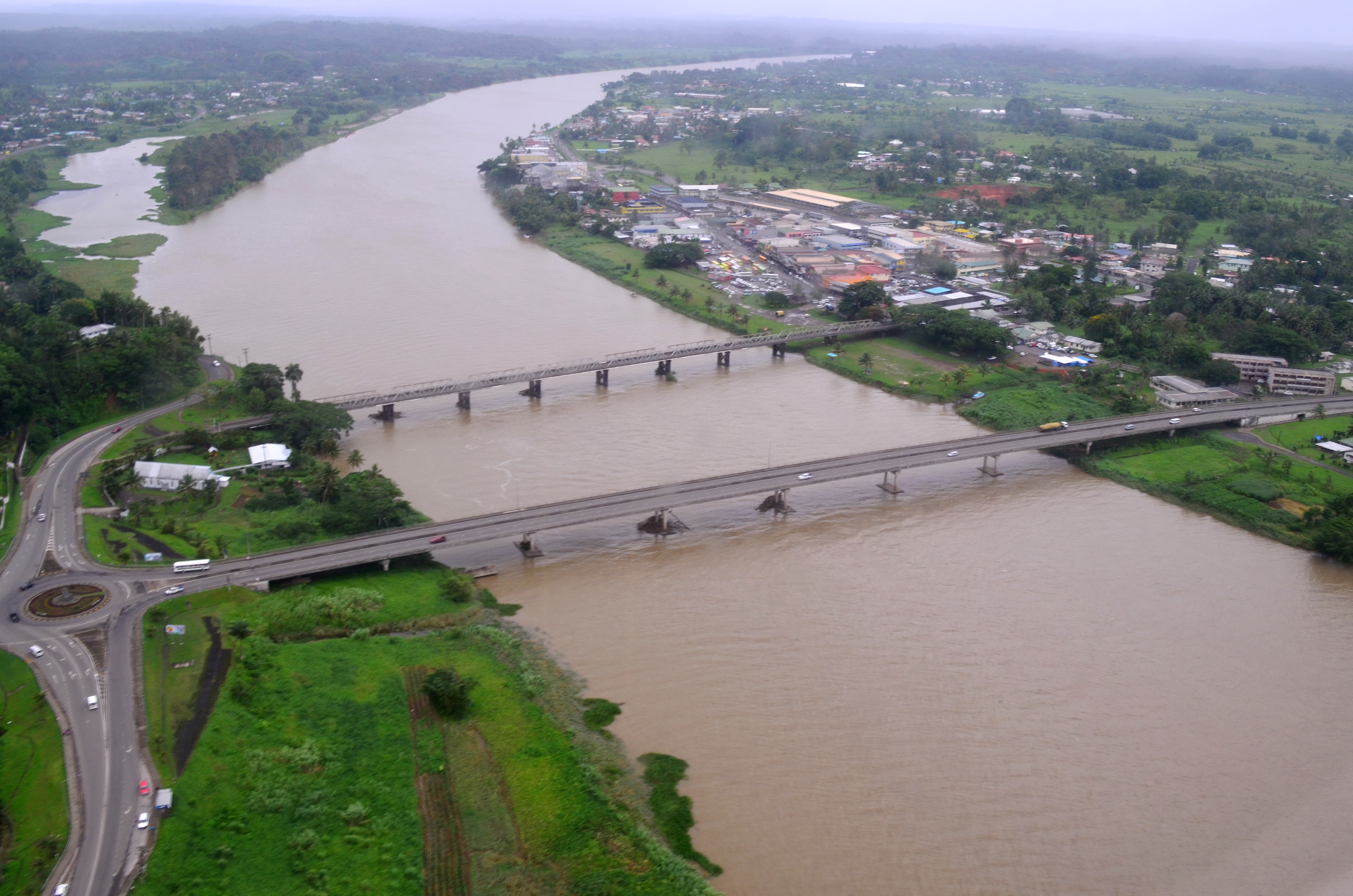
- Aerial view of the Rewa River with Nausori town, the old and new Rewa Bridge visible. The town is the only urban centre in Fiji along its banks.

- Watershed of the Rewa River

Location
- Countries: Fiji

Physical characteristics
- Source: Confluence of Wainibuka and Wainimala
  - location: Nadrau Plateau
  - coordinates: 17°49′21.9936″S 178°20′50.2332″E
  - elevation: 12 m (39 ft)
- 2nd source: Wainibuka
  - coordinates: 17°33′41.3028″S 177°59′36.654″E
  - elevation: 850 m (2,790 ft)
- 3rd source: Wainimala
  - coordinates: 17°43′26.6304″S 177°58′27.264″E
  - elevation: 1,000 m (3,300 ft)
- Mouth: Laucala Bay (Pacific Ocean)
  - coordinates: 18°8′52.6956″S 178°31′27.1524″E
  - elevation: 0 m (0 ft)
- Length: • Rewa–Wainibuka 172 km (107 mi) • Rewa–Wainimala 167 km (104 mi)
- Basin size: 3,092.2 km^{2} (1,193.9 mi^{2})
- Width
  - maximum: 400 m (1,300 ft)
- Depth
  - maximum: 15 m (49 ft)
- Discharge
  - location: Rewa Delta
  - average: 7.9 km^{3}/a (250 m^{3}/s)
- Discharge
  - location: Navolau
  - average: (1970–2010) 187.7 m^{3}/s (6,630 cu ft/s)
  - minimum: 33.3 m^{3}/s (1,180 cu ft/s)
  - maximum: 3,216.8 m^{3}/s (113,600 cu ft/s)

Basin features
- Progression: Pacific Ocean
- River system: Rewa River
- Tributaries
  - left: Wainibuka
  - right: Wainimala, Waidina, Waimanu

The Rewa River is the longest and widest river in Fiji. Located on the island of Viti Levu, the Rewa originates from the confluence of the Wainibuka and Wainimala rivers and flows southeast to Laucala Bay near Suva.

== Course ==
The Rewa River is a major river in the eastern part of the island of Viti Levu. It drains the wettest third of the island, making it the largest river in the South Pacific and Fiji.

The Rewa River is fed by two major headwaters, the Wainibuka and Wainimala, and is joined by several other rivers of importance (Waidina, Waimanu) before it reaches the sea by a delta of many mouths. It is navigable by small crafts up 80 kilometers from its mouth and its basin is enriched by a deep deposit of alluvial soil.

== Hydrology ==
The headwaters of the Rewa originate at the Tomanivi (Nadrau Plateau) peak (1,324 m) at an altitude of 700 and 1,000 m above sea level. From there, the river meanders from north to south and flows into the Pacific Ocean with a delta covering an area of 240 square kilometers. Its total length from the source of Wainimala is 167 km and from the source of Wainibuka 172 km. Its catchment area receives about 3,932 mm of precipitation (according to the Köppen climate classification, this area falls into the Af type). Compared to its small catchment area (3,092 km²), its water discharge is relatively high (annual average 250 m³/s). Its floods are influenced by tropical cyclones. As a result, destructive flood waves can form on the river. The width of the river in its lower reaches 400 m and its depth 15 m.

== Ecology and economy ==
The catchment area includes the tropical rainforests of Fiji. The river delta is covered by fertile, alluvial sediments, on which a diverse vegetation has developed (tropical trees, mangroves, peat bogs, seagrass meadows). The river also hosts the endangered bull shark (Carcharinas leucas) in its lower reaches.

The delta is home to several Fijian villages. Rice and vegetables are grown in the river valley. Cattle are also raised for dairy farming.

About 80–100 kilometres of the river is navigable by small boats. In Nausori, a new 425 m long bridge has been built across the river alongside the existing old bridge with EU funding.
