= Spring Break Fiji =

Annual music festival in Fiji

- Genre: EDM, festival travel
- Locations: Beachcomber Island, Fiji
- Years active: 2013–present
- Founder: Rich Henry
- Website: springbreakfiji.com

Spring Break Fiji is an annual music festival and retreat organised by New Zealand tourism company TourismHQ. The five-day event is held at Beachcomber Island in Fiji's Mamanuca Islands. It was founded by Rich Henry in 2013.

== History ==
TourismHQ earlier ran a Fiji trip branded Blue Sky. Spring Break Fiji was established in 2013 as a packaged festival holiday aimed mainly at young travellers from New Zealand and Australia. Coverage has described exclusive use of Beachcomber Island, yacht transfers, island activities, and DJ performances as part of the itinerary.

In 2015, Max Key (son of then New Zealand prime minister John Key) performed at the event as part of the DJ duo Troskey with Joshua Troskie. During that edition a fire destroyed one bure at Beachcomber Island Resort; guests were evacuated and no injuries were reported. Organisers and resort staff said the fire was contained to a single building.

The January 2023 edition drew criticism after guests reported power outages, drinking-water shortages, and related problems. Former employees described the event as being "poorly organised". Organisers apologised and attributed difficulties to rough weather and a resort generator failure, and advised guests to contact their insurers. Consumer NZ said organisers could face legal action under consumer law.

In 2024 Beachcomber Island Resort was acquired by interests associated with Vision Hotels / the Deeley brothers, who announced a FJ$10 million renovation and expansion of the resort.
