= List of festivals in Fiji =

Public holidays in Fiji reflect the country's cultural diversity. Each major religion in Fiji has a public holiday dedicated to it. Also Fiji's major cities and towns hold annual carnivals, commonly called festivals, which are usually named for something relevant to the city or town, such as the Sugar Festival in Lautoka, as Lautoka's largest and most historically important industry is sugar production.

Public Holidays that fall on the weekend are usually moved to either the Friday of the preceding week or the Monday of the following week. This includes religious holidays as well, though in essence they are celebrated on the actual day.

== List of important festivals and days in Fiji ==
| Date | Festival | Notes |
|---|---|---|
| January 1 | New Year's Day | Celebrations can continue for a week, or even a month, in some areas. It is common practice in Fiji to beat drums and shower one another with water. Fireworks and an annual street party take place in the heart of Suva, the nation's capital, to welcome the new year. This represents one of the largest new-year celebrations in the South Pacific. |
| February/March | Maha Shivaratri | Hindu celebration of Shiva (not a public holiday). |
| February/March | Holi | Hindu "Festival of Colors" (not a public holiday). |
| March/April | Ram Naumi | Hindu celebration of the birth of Rama (not a public holiday). |
| March/April | Hanuman Jayanti | Hindu celebration of the birth of Hanuman (not a public holiday). |
| March/April | Easter | Major Christian festival; the Friday (Good Friday) and the Sunday (Easter Sunday) are both official public holidays. There is also a Public Holiday on Easter Monday, the Monday following Easter Sunday. |
| March/April | Palm Sunday | Also celebrated as Children's Sunday by Fiji's Methodists (not a public holiday). |
| May | Ratu Sir Lala Sukuna Day | The celebrations in honor of Fiji's first modern statesman actually begin a week early. It is almost always celebrated on a Friday. This was formerly a public holiday, but the military-backed interim government abolished it following the military coup of 2006. |
| May 4 | National Youth Day | Public holiday celebrating the Youth of Fiji. |
| May 14 | Girmit Day | Public holiday commemorating the arrival of the first Indians to Fiji. |
| June 11 | Queen's Birthday | Official birthday of Queen Elizabeth II, former Queen of Fiji, still recognized by the chiefs as the Tui Viti, or Paramount Chief of Fiji. |
| Sometime in the first half of the year, and based on the Islamic and lunar calendars | Eid al-Fitr | Muslim festival celebrating after Ramadhan. The public holiday is not on the actual day of celebration due to the unpredictability of the moon's appearance that signals the day. |
| August | Bula Festival | Celebrated in Nadi. |
| August | Hisbiscus Carnival/ Festival | Celebrated in Suva. |
| August | Friendly North Festival | Celebrated in Labasa. |
| August/September | Krishna Janmashtami | Hindu celebration of the birth of Krishna (not a public holiday). |
| September | Sugar Festival | Celebrated in Lautoka. |
| September | Coral Coast Festival | Celebrated in Sigatoka. |
| September/October | Navaratri | Hindu festival of Mahadevi (not a public holiday). |
| October 10 | Fiji Day | The anniversary of both Fiji's cession to the United Kingdom in 1874 and attainment of independence in 1970. The week leading up to Fiji Day, Fiji Week, features seven days of religious and cultural ceremonies celebrating the country's diversity. |
| October/November | Diwali | Hindu "Festival of Lights", honours Lakshmi, the goddess of wealth and prosperity. The public holiday is a day of colour and celebration amongst all of Fiji's races and creeds - not in its religious sense but for its festive and cultural aspects. Hindus in Fiji usually open their homes to other families to share in the traditional Indian sweets and foods of Diwali in Fiji. |
| November 6 | Music | BlueSky Fiji "Music Festival" charters a tropical island for an international music festival. |
| December 26 | Boxing Day | The day after Christmas. |

== Variable dates ==
- 2020
  - March 9-10 – Holi
  - March 20 – March equinox
  - April 2 – Rama Navami
  - April 5 – Palm Sunday / Children's Sunday
  - April 10-11 – Good Friday and Holy Saturday
  - April 12 – Easter
  - June 21 – June solstice
  - September 23 – September equinox
  - October 28 – The Prophet's Birthday
  - November 14 – Diwali
  - December 21 – December solstice
- 2021
  - March 28-29 – Holi
  - March 28 – Palm Sunday / Children's Sunday
  - April 2-3 – Good Friday and Holy Saturday
  - April 4 – Easter
  - October 11 – Fiji Day celebrated
  - October 18 – The Prophet's Birthday
  - November 4 – Diwali
- 2022
  - March 17-18 – Holi
  - April 2 – Palm Sunday / Children's Sunday
  - April 15-16 – Good Friday and Holy Saturday
  - April 17 – Easter
  - October 10
    - Fiji Day
    - The Prophet's Birthday
- 2023
  - January 2 – Day off for New Year
  - March 6-7 – Holi
  - March 21 – March equinox
  - April 7-8 – Good Friday and Holy Saturday
  - April 9 – Easter
  - June 22 – June Solstice
  - September 23 – September equinox
  - September 27 – The Prophet's Birthday
  - November 13 – Diwali
  - December 22 – December solstice
- 2024
  - March 22 – March equinox
  - March 24-25 – Holi
  - March 24 – Palm Sunday / Children's Sunday
  - March 29-30 – Good Friday and Holy Saturday
  - March 31 – Easter
  - April 1 – Easter Monday
  - June 21 – June Solstice
  - September 16 – The Prophet's Birthday
  - September 23 – September equinox
  - December 21 – December solstice
