= South Pacific Stock Exchange =

The South Pacific Stock Exchange (SPX) is a stock exchange based in Suva, Fiji.

On 1 July 2010, the SPX launched an electronic trading platform (ETP). The Exchange now has market phases which allow the brokers to perform tasks throughout a business day. With the electronic system of trading, the price time priority is maintained, but there are two sessions of normal trading hours. The first one is from 10.30am to 11.30am and the second normal session of trading happens from 2.30pm to 3.30pm. This is when the orders may be entered, amended or withdrawn and are matched on entry. There are “pre-open” sessions where brokers can enter, amend or withdraw orders for their clients. The platform goes into enquiry mode after 3.30pm and is only accessible for viewing purposes. Unmatched orders at the end of the day that remain unexecuted are reloaded in the trading platform for the next day.

Transactions are immediate and transparent and results of each session are reported widely to the media, regulators, members, market participants, institutional investors and other interested parties. All the trading reports are automatically generated and updates in real-time.

The SPX maintains the SPX total return index (STRI) which is an aggregate market capitalization index which reflects the aggregate market value of all its components relative to their aggregate value on the base day. The index is constructed on a base of 1000 set at 4 January 2000. Components of this index include shares all of SPX listed securities. STRI is an accumulation index which reflects the total return from the stock market including the price and dividend returns.

Trading was paper-based before the launch of ETP, conducted by a "call market" on a physical trading floor at 10:30am each weekday. Each listed entity name was called out by the "market caller" and orders were submitted by brokers and dealers and recorded by the "chalker" and the "recorders". The market caller then matched orders on a price and time priority basis. A "chief arbiter" supervised the trading. Unmatched orders at the end of the session were carried forward to the next day.

== History ==
The Exchange was established in 1979 as the Suva Stock Exchange, owned by the Fiji Development Bank. In 1993 the ownership was broadened to allow eight other financial institutions to take part.

The market began as a "trading post" where orders were telephoned in and remained until matched. In 1996 it changed to its present form as a "call market" described above.

In 2000 it changed its name to the South Pacific Stock Exchange, with a view to becoming a regional exchange.

In 2019, the Exchange focused on improving its visibility and a rebranding exercise to be in-line with international counterparts. This included:

1. Office Relocation - In March 2019, the SPX Group relocated to Sabrina Building in Victoria Parade with a view to strengthen its visibility amongst ordinary Fijians and promote its mission to increase the attractiveness of the SPX as the preferred investment and capital raising venue. The relocation also gave SPX an option to install a stock ticker display screen which is a common sight at buildings which house stock exchanges globally.

2. Rebranding from SPSE to SPX - The rebranding exercise including the launch of a new logo was part of the progressive development being undertaken at SPX and has been a proud moment for the institution itself with 2019 being the 40th year of operations for the SPX. The rebranded acronym “SPX” promotes itself as a fresh, innovative and progressive identification for the SPX operations and is aligned to international standards used by exchanges globally to depict their name. The colour combinations depicted in the rebranded SPX logo reflect the deep blue Pacific Ocean with blends of green to symbolise growth and richness.

== See also ==
- List of stock exchanges in the Commonwealth of Nations
