= Rewa Bridge =

Road bridge in Viti Levu, Fiji

Coordinates: 18°1′57″S 178°31′44″E

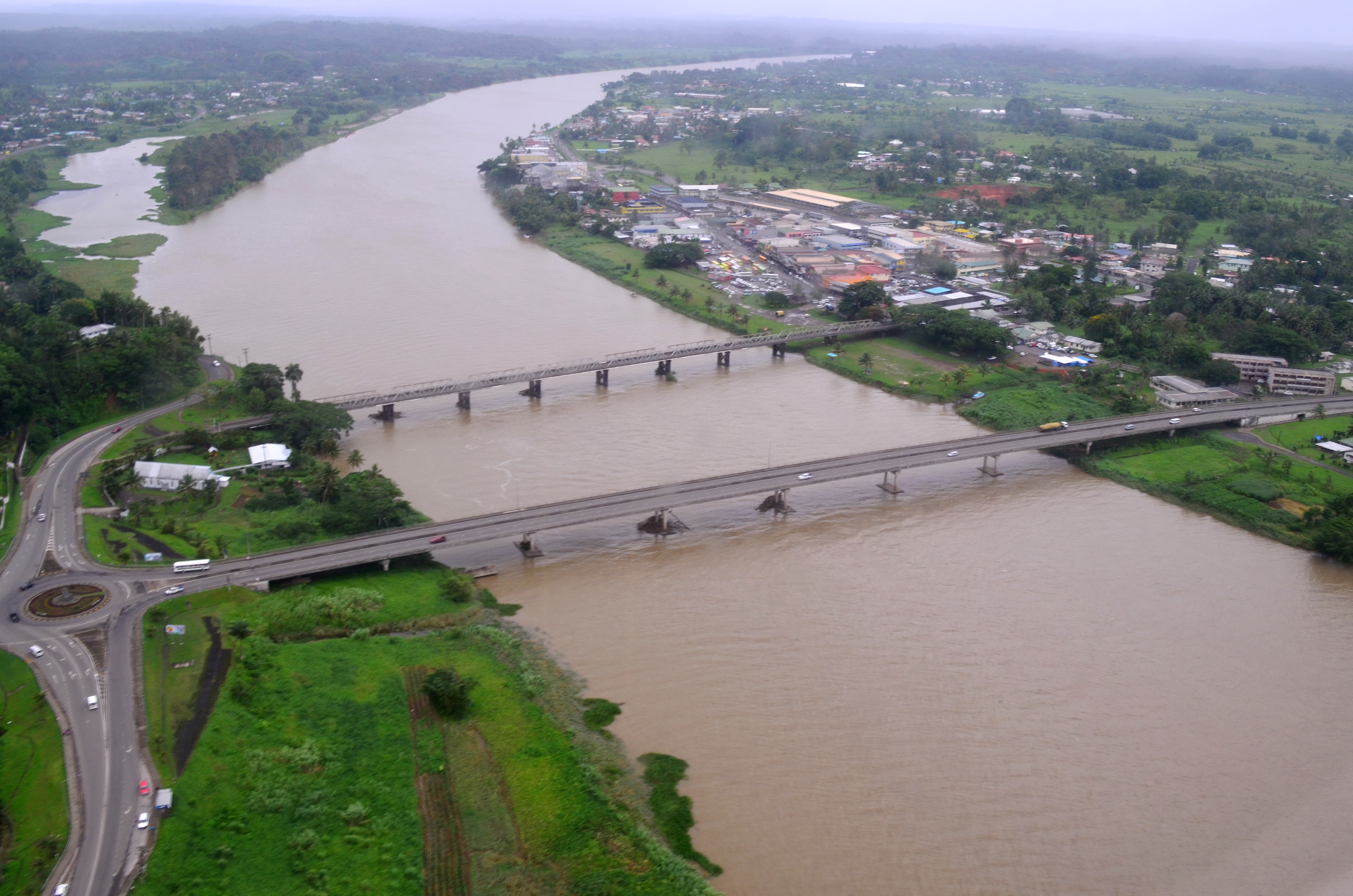
The New Rewa Bridge besides the Old Rewa Bridge

The Rewa Bridge is a four-lane concrete girder road bridge over the Rewa River joining Suva and Nausori in Fiji. The bridge has a length of 425 metres (1,394 ft), comprising seven internal spans of 49.5 m and end spans of 39.25 m. It is the longest bridge in Fiji and the longest bridge of its type in the South Pacific.

The bridge was funded by a partnership between the European Union and the government of Fiji and was constructed by Fletcher Construction for the government of Fiji between October 2003 and August 2006 for a cost of FJ$29.7 million.

== Old Rewa Bridge ==
The new Rewa bridge replaced a 60-year-old structurally unsound steel bridge. As of 2011, the old Rewa bridge was still in existence. A proposal was floated by the Nausori Town Council to use the old bridge as flea market. However, in 2011, the Fijian Ministry of Works allocated FJ$1 million in order to dismantle the bridge so that the materials could be used for other bridges in the country.
