= .fj =

Internet country code top-level domain for Fiji

- Introduced: 3 June 1992
- TLD type: Country code top-level domain
- Status: Active
- Registry: The University of the South Pacific
- Sponsor: The University of the South Pacific
- Intended use: Entities connected with Fiji
- Actual use: Used in Fiji
- Registration restrictions: None for most subdomains; some such as .ac.fj are restricted
- Structure: Registrations are at third level beneath names such as .com.fj and .org.fj
- Documents: Registration agreement
- Dispute policies: UDRP
- DNSSEC: Yes
- Registry website: .fj domain registry

.fj is the country code top-level domain (ccTLD) for Fiji. Domain names can not be registered directly under .fj, but must be registered as a third level name. The .fj TLD was registered in 1992 and is currently administered by The University of the South Pacific IT Services.

== Second-level domains ==
Second-level domains that websites may be registered under include:

Domain	Status	Intended users
ac.fj	Reserved	Academic institutions of any kind (excluding primary and secondary schools)
school.fj	Reserved	Primary and secondary schools
gov.fj	Reserved	Government of Fiji
mil.fj	Reserved	Republic of Fiji Military Forces
biz.fj	No restrictions	Business
com.fj	No restrictions	Business
info.fj	No restrictions	Informational websites
name.fj	No restrictions	Individuals
net.fj	No restrictions	Network providers/operators
org.fj	No restrictions	Organisations, especially nonprofits
pro.fj	No restrictions	Certified professionals
