= Nakasi, Fiji =

Coordinates: 18°04′S 178°31′E

Nakasi Nasinu/Nausori नाकासी
- Suburb
- Nicknames: 9½ Miles, Nakasi Park Estate
- Interactive map of Nakasi
- Land Titles: Nakasi Park estate - freehold other - crown land
- Island: Viti Levu
- Division: Central Division
- Province: Rewa

Population (2008)
  - Total: 18,919
- Postal code: 2602

Nakasi (Fijian pronunciation: [nakasi]) is a suburb located along the Suva-Nausori corridor, in the Central Division of the Republic of Fiji. The 9½ miles factor is also used to identify the locality as it denotes the distance from Suva as it forms the common identification of the suburbs along the Kings Highway from Suva to Nausori. Nakasi is located 15 km north-east of Suva city and 5 km south of Nausori. It falls under the jurisdiction of the local government area of the township of Nausori. Nakasi is one of the largest of the many suburbs along the Suva-Nausori corridor. The current population stands at 18,919.

== History ==
The growth of the Fijian capital Suva as a metropolitan area drew people from all over the country to Suva. This influx of people allowed the developments of many suburbs along the north Kings Highway. The freehold land title enticed people to buy land and settle over a period of time. Nakasi has people from all over Fiji with the majority from Labasa, Ba, Nadi and the outer islands. The main trunk road of Nakasi, Vishnu Deo Road, is named after Pandit Vishnu Deo, who was a powerful Indo-Fijian political leader in Fiji in the mid-1900s. Nakasi is a multi-racial suburb with a substantial population of people of Indian heritage. In May 2012 Nakasi was declared crime-free with a partnership forged between the police and the community. Some notable streets with executive level houses include Valili, Matana, Koroba, Willow, JP Maharaj and many side streets of the main trunk road. The Nakasi Park Estate area has become one of the upper class areas of the Suva and Nausori urban complex due to the developments and land demand.

== Commercial and Industrial Area ==
The Nakasi Commercial Business District is located along Kings Highway between Wainibuku 9 miles to Sasawira 10 miles with a concentration of commercial activities near the Nakasi roundabout. The current upgrading of roads to 4 lanes has made this section of the Suva - Nausori corridor amongst the busiest in Fiji.

The industrial area is concentrated in the midsection of Vishnu Deo Road which consists of SCA Australasia, and other heavy works industries. The recent proposal to build a supermarket near SCA Australasia will further uplift the service in that area. Nakasi has a police station, a post office and a telecom exchange station all in its name.

== Transport ==
The area is well serviced by taxis and buses. There are a three taxi stands on the main road which operate on a call basis. Bus service is regular and is serviced by four bus companies, Nasese Buses, Nairs Transport and George Transport for the Suva route and Island Buses for the Nausori route. Of these Nairs Transport, which has one of the largest fleet of buses in Fiji, is based in Nakasi.

== Schools ==
Because of the area's size and the population, Nakasi is serviced by seven schools which are committee based with religious affiliation but not restricted to enrolling students of a certain religion as all are multi-racial and multi-cultural schools. The four primary schools include :Bhawani Dayal Memorial Primary School, Bainivalu Primary School, St Joseph the Worker Primary School and Nasinu Muslim Primary School. The three secondary schools are : Bhawani Dayal Arya College, Nasinu Muslim College and Nakasi High School.
