= Nausori =

Nausori नौसोरि (Hindi)
- Town
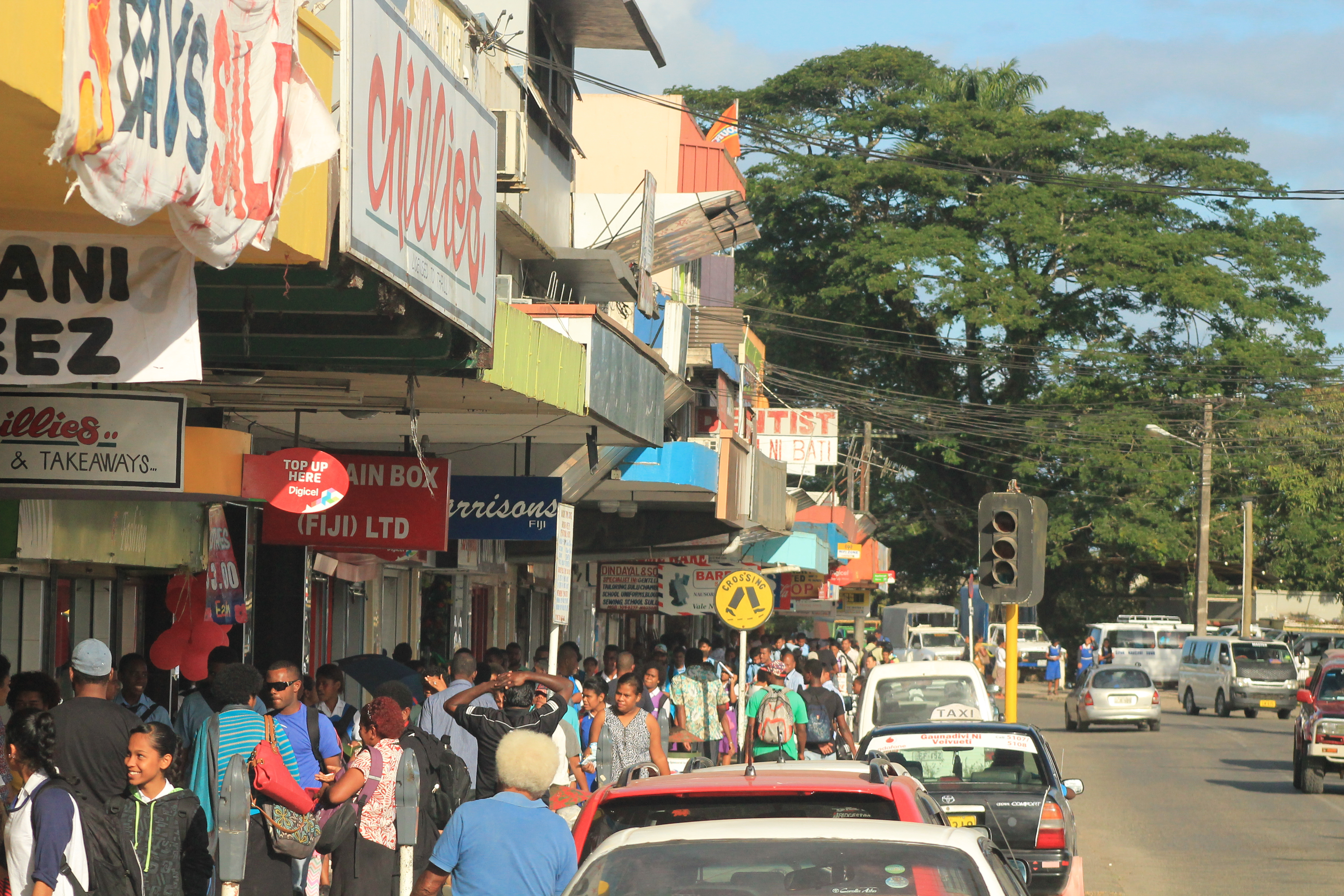
- Nausori

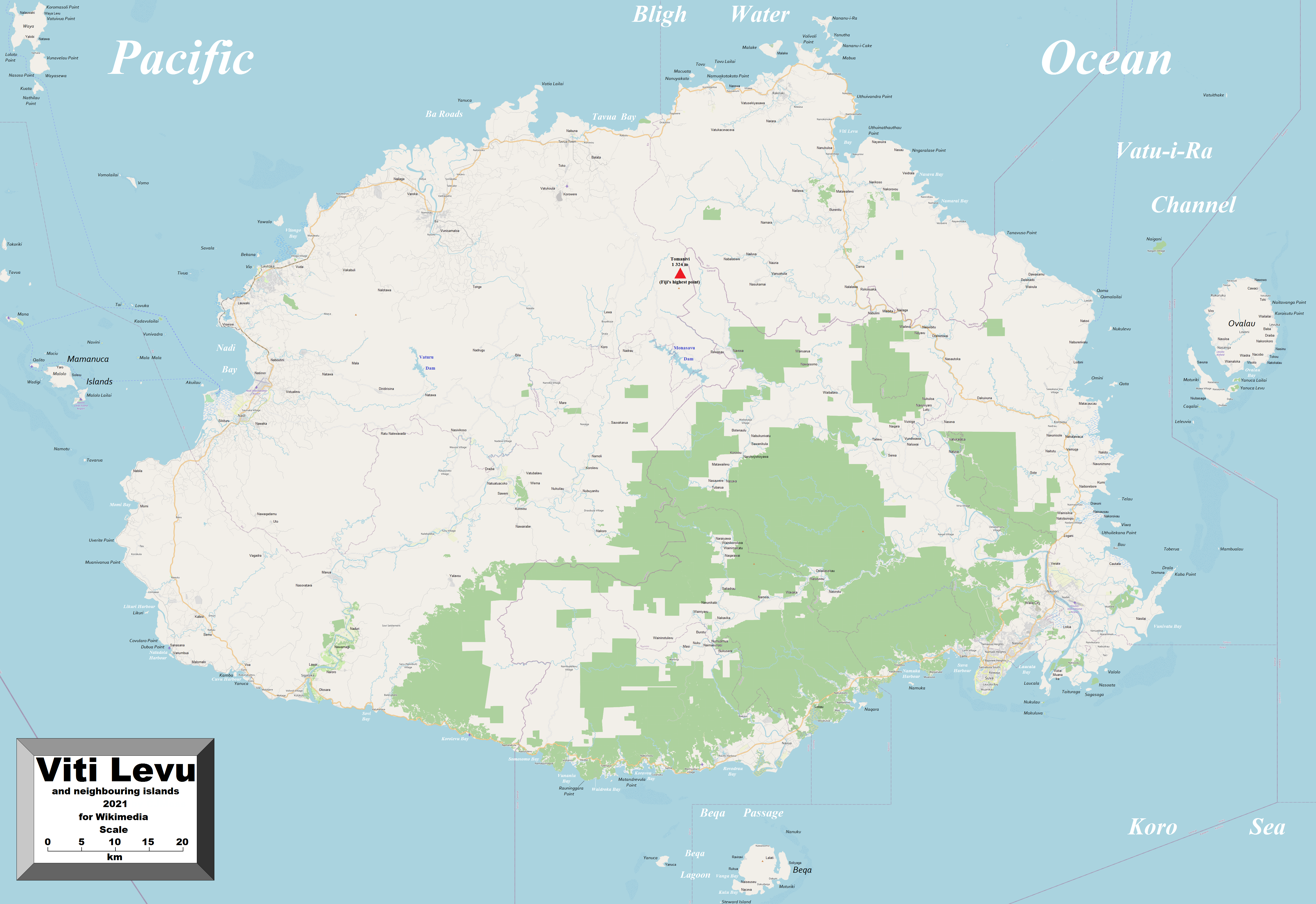
- Viti Levu with Nausori in the southeast

- Location in Fiji
- Coordinates: 18°1′28″S 178°32′43.54″E
- Country: Fiji
- Island: Viti Levu
- Division: Central Division
- Province: Tailevu; Rewa; Naitasiri

Population (2017)
  - Total: 57,866
- Time zone: UTC+12

Nausori (Fijian pronunciation: [nɔu̯sori]) is a town in Fiji. It had a population of 57,866 at the 2017 census. This makes it the fourth most populous municipality in the country. Situated 19 kilometers from the Fijian capital Suva, it forms one pole of the burgeoning Suva-Nausori corridor. Nausori is home to three provinces Rewa, Tailevu and Naitasiri.

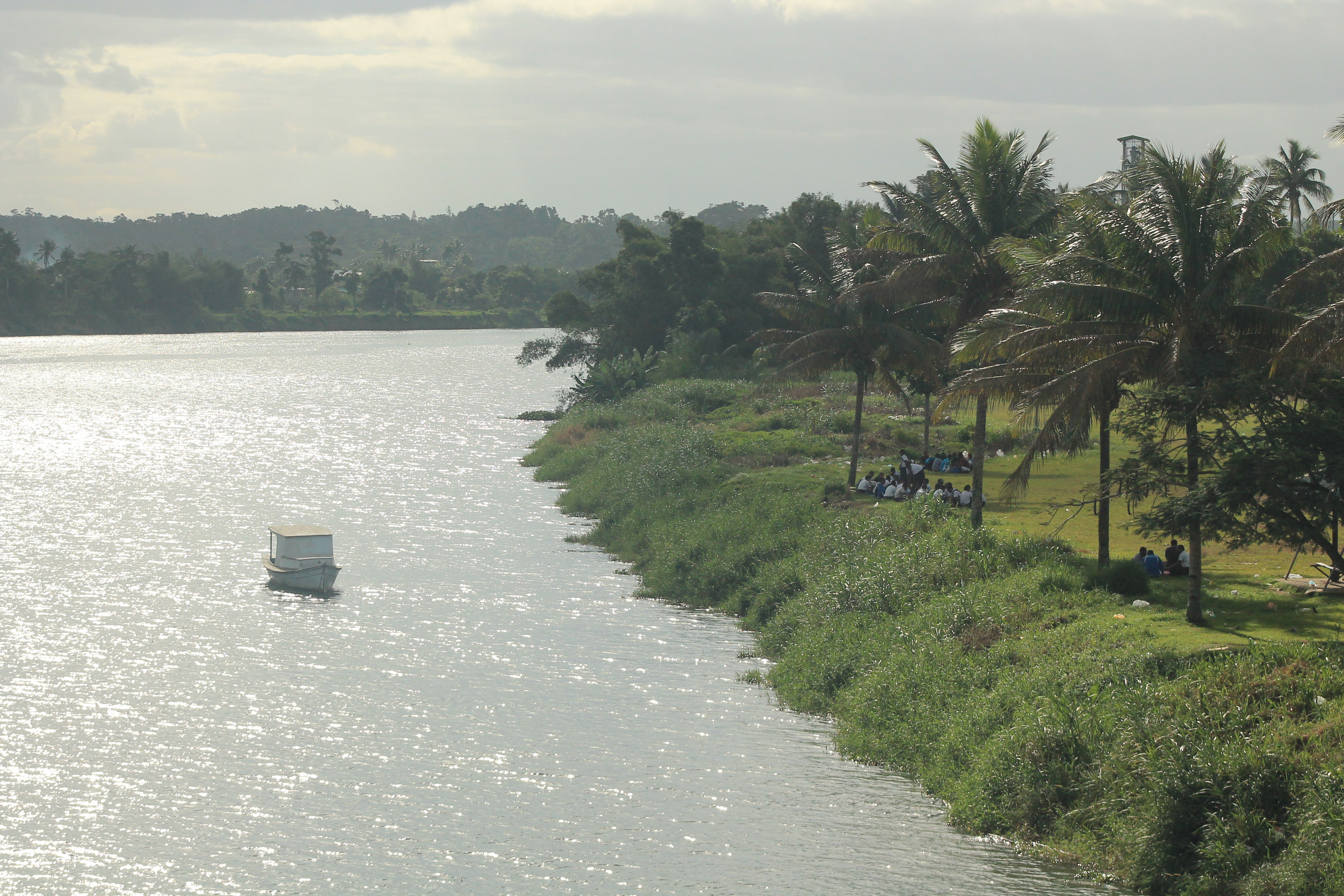
View of Syria park and Rewa river from the old Rewa Bridge.

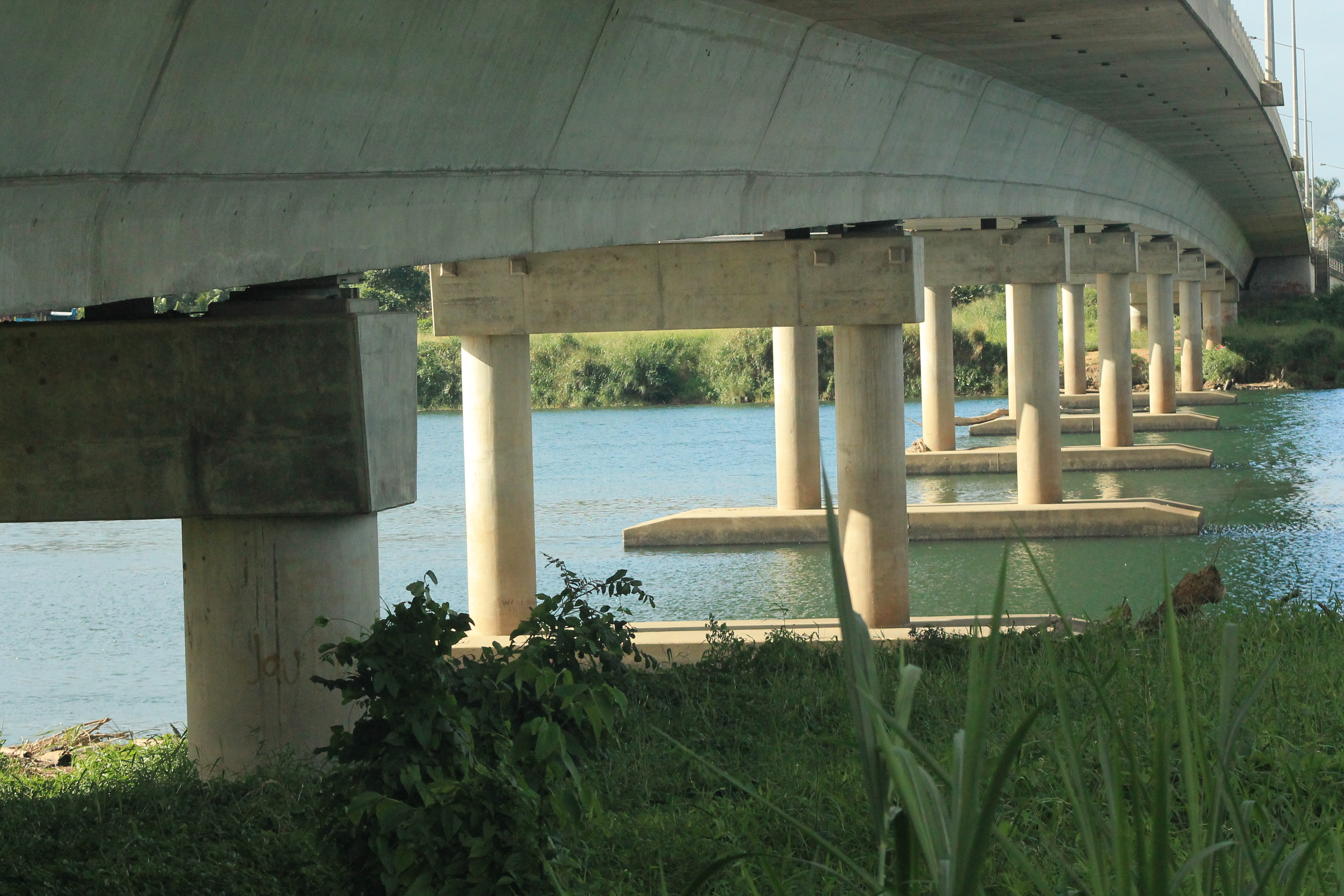
Under the New Rewa Bridge

The 425-metre (1,394 ft) Rewa Bridge across the Rewa River, built by Fletcher Construction and opened in 2006, links Nausori to the capital, Suva.

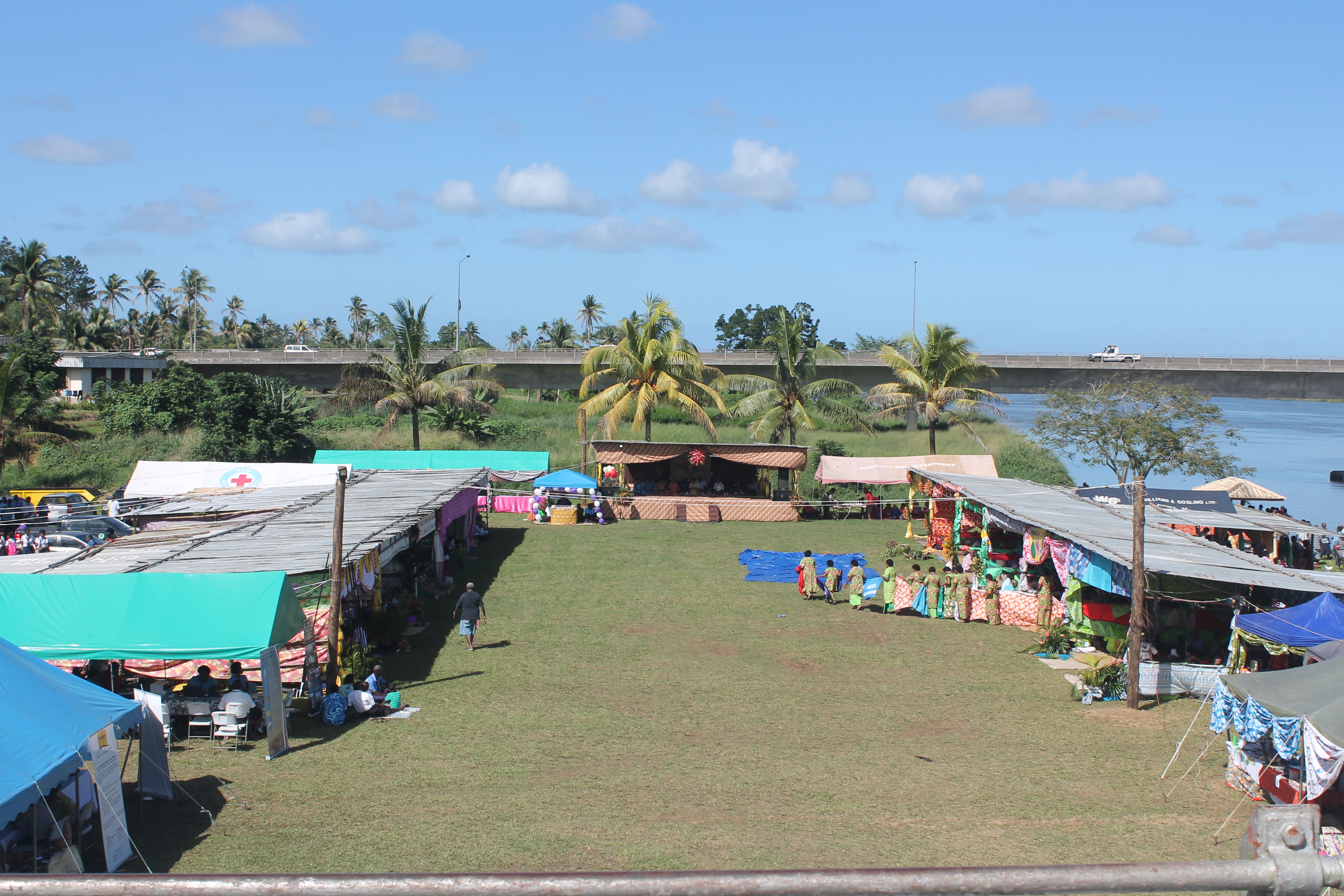
Rewa Day at Syria Park, Nausori - 2016

== Economy ==
There are two major business areas in Nausori - the town of Nausori proper, and Nakasi. A new market and bus terminal were opened in 2015, allowing for the town's future development. A major upgrade of the local airport, including a new terminal and a longer runway, was expected to get started in the first quarter of 2017.

== History ==
The old town of Nausori was situated around 5 km north of the current one, heading towards Kasavu. The ruins of the old town, situated in Naduruloulou, are still there. Now, it is a tourist centre and a haven for tropical flora and fauna gardens. Colonial buildings, town halls, local courts, and grand residences can be found here, dating back to before the 20th century.

In 1882 a sugar mill run by the Colonial Sugar Refining Company of Australia was established on the left bank of the Rewa River, with operations commencing on 17 July. The Nausori mill was the first large-scale sugar mill in Fiji, and in 1884 it became the first place in Fiji to be lit by electricity. The sugar mill was closed in 1959 as it became uneconomic to operate primarily due to the very low sugar content in the cane. The mill was then used for processing animal feed and a timber yard.

== Notable people ==
- Waisea Luveniyali - rugby union player
- Latchman Raghubir - village elder and notable leader of the Kasavu Indian Village from 1945 to 1990s
- Viliame Kikau - Professional Rugby League Player for the Penrith Panthers who was born in the town of Nausori.

== Sport ==
Nausori is the home of association football teams Rewa F.C. and Tailevu Naitasiri F.C. and rugby union team Tailevu Knights. Multi-use sports stadium Vodafone Ratu Cakobau Park is in the town and hosts the three teams' matches. The stadium has a capacity of 8,000.

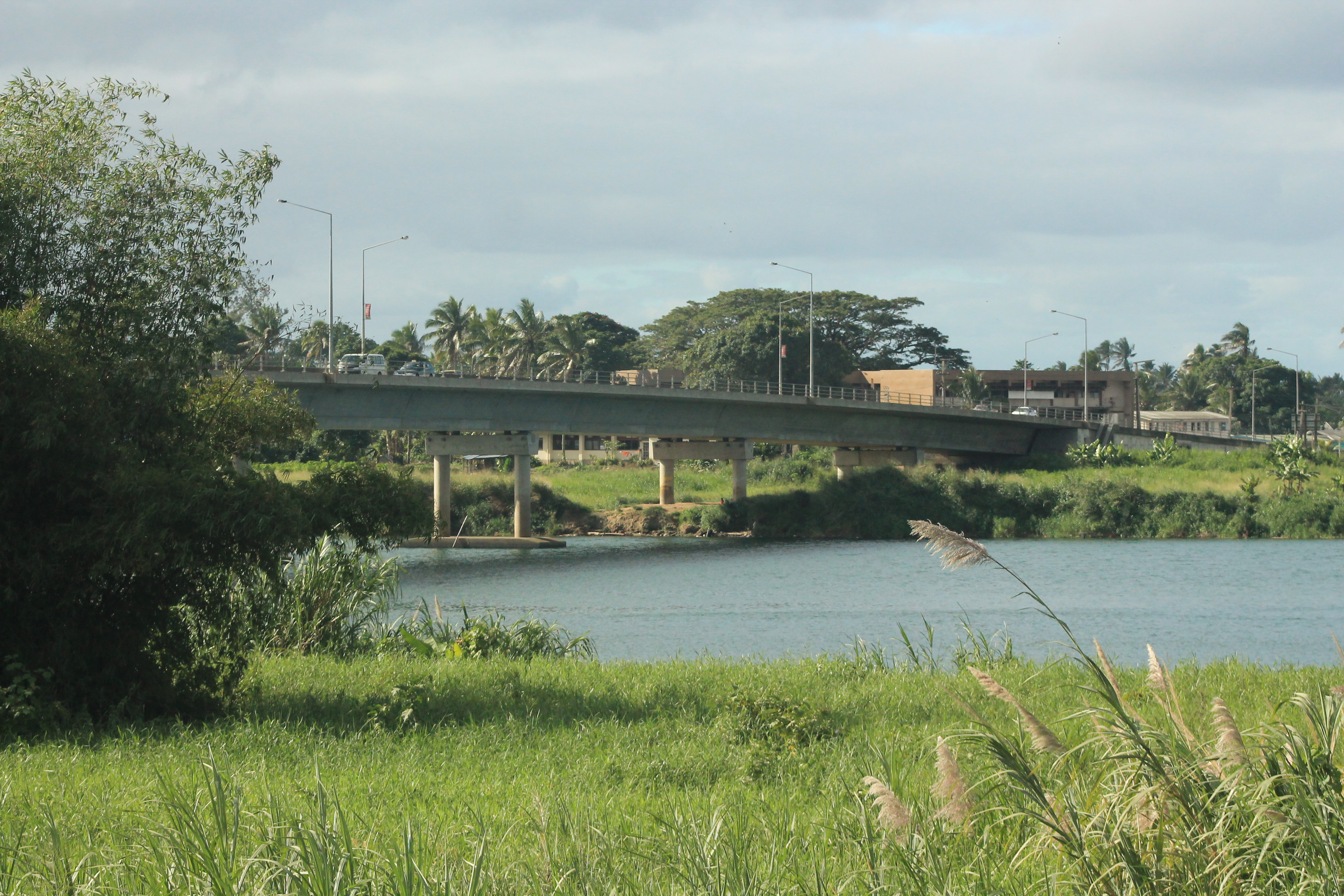
Rewa Bridge, Nausori, Fiji

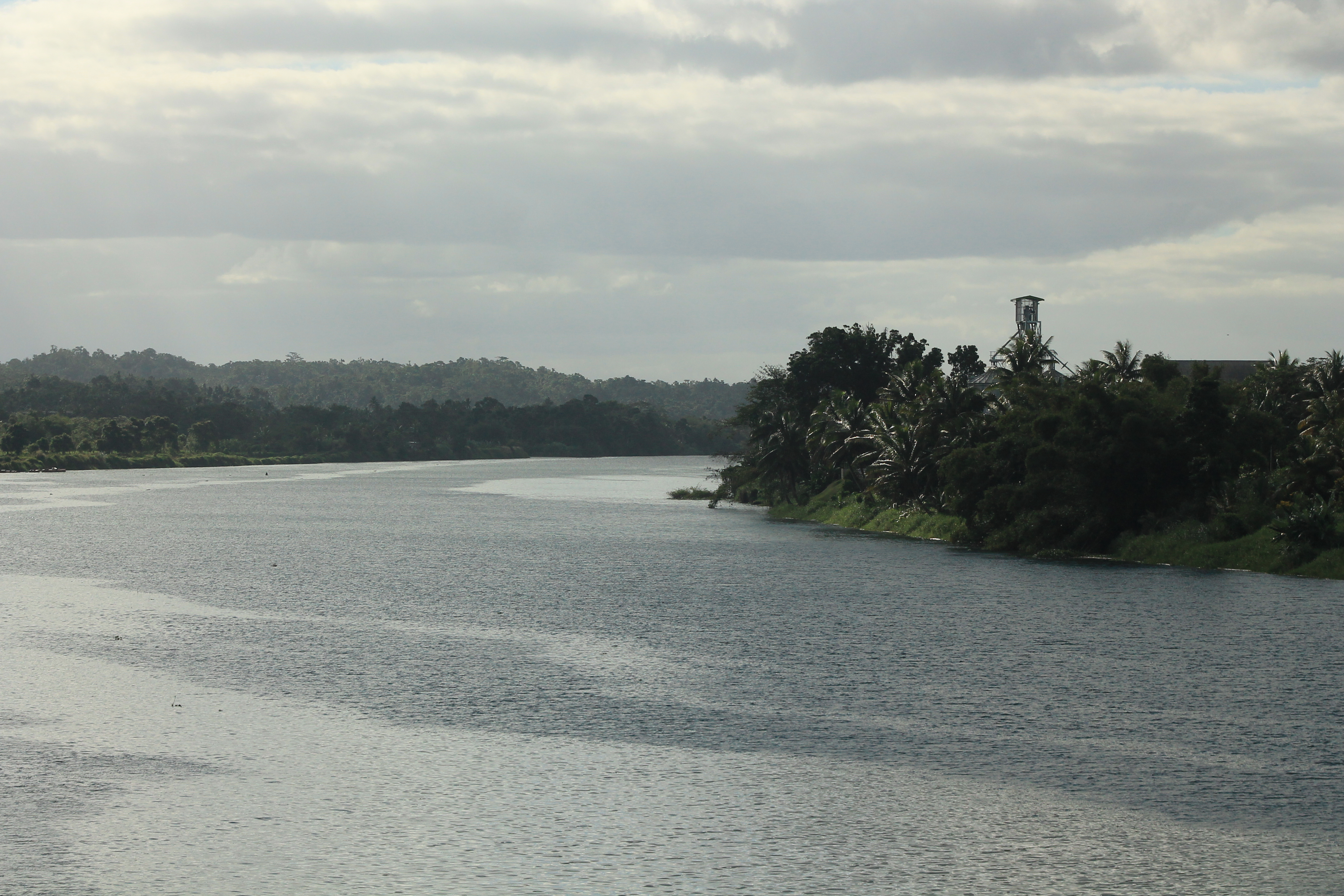
View of Rewa River and Nausori from the old Rewa Bridge
