= List of members of the Parliament of Fiji (2014–2018) =

The 50 elected members of the Parliament of Fiji from 2014 to 2018 were elected on 17 September 2014.

Member	Party	Notes
Rosy Akbar	FijiFirst	
Frank Bainimarama	FijiFirst	
Parveen Bala	FijiFirst	
Veena Bhatnagar	FijiFirst	
Mosese Bulitavu	Social Democratic Liberal Party	
Joeli Cawaki	FijiFirst	
Iliesa Delana	FijiFirst	
Tupou Draunidalo	National Federation Party	
Jiosefa Dulakiverata	Social Democratic Liberal Party	
Lorna Eden	FijiFirst	
Viliame Gavoka	Social Democratic Liberal Party	
Semesa Karavaki	Social Democratic Liberal Party	
Teimumu Kepa	Social Democratic Liberal Party	
Kiniviliame Kiliraki	Social Democratic Liberal Party	
Jioje Konrote	FijiFirst	
Semi Koroilavesau	FijiFirst	
Faiyaz Koya	FijiFirst	
Inoke Kubuabola	FijiFirst	
Brij Lal	FijiFirst	
Naiqama Lalabalavu	Social Democratic Liberal Party	
Jiko Luveni	FijiFirst	Elected Speaker and replaced by Laisenia Bale Tuitubou
Alvick Maharaj	FijiFirst	
Suliano Matanitobua	Social Democratic Liberal Party	
Alifereti Nabulivou	FijiFirst	
Ruveni Nadabe Nadalo	FijiFirst	
Osea Naiqamu	FijiFirst	
Vijay Nath	FijiFirst	
Timoci Natuva	FijiFirst	
Niko Nawaikula	Social Democratic Liberal Party	
Sela Vuinakasa Nanovo	Social Democratic Liberal Party	Died on 14 February 2018, replaced by Mere Samisoni
Sanjit Patel	FijiFirst	
Viam Pillay	FijiFirst	
Biman Prasad	National Federation Party	
Aseri Radrodro	Social Democratic Liberal Party	
Salote Radrodro	Social Democratic Liberal Party	
Mahendra Reddy	FijiFirst	
Netani Rika	FijiFirst	
Aiyaz Sayed-Khaiyum	FijiFirst	
Inia Seruiratu	FijiFirst	
Neil Sharma	FijiFirst	
Balmindar Singh	FijiFirst	
Prem Singh	National Federation Party	
Ashneel Sudhakar	FijiFirst	
Viliame Tagivetaua	Social Democratic Liberal Party	
Isoa Tikoca	Social Democratic Liberal Party	
Pio Tikoduadua	FijiFirst	
Jone Usamate	FijiFirst	
Anare Vadei	Social Democratic Liberal Party	
Samuela Vunivalu	FijiFirst	
Mereseini Vuniwaqa	FijiFirst	
Source: Fiji Village
