= Fijian nationality law =

Citizenship of Fiji Act 2009

Parliament of Fiji
- Long title: An Act to provide for the acquisition, renunciation and deprivation of citizenship of the state
- Citation: No. 23 of 2009
- Territorial extent: Fiji
- Enacted by: Parliament of Fiji
- Commenced: 10 April 2009
- Status: Amended

Fijian nationality law details the conditions by which a person is a national of Fiji. The primary law governing nationality requirements is the Citizenship of Fiji Act 2009, which came into force on 10 April 2009.

Any person born in Fiji, other than those born between 1990 and 1997, automatically receives citizenship at birth regardless of the nationalities of their parents. Individuals born while the 1990 Constitution of Fiji was in force only received Fijian citizenship at birth if at least one parent was a Fijian citizen. Foreigners may become Fijian citizens by naturalisation after residing in the country for at least five years and demonstrating knowledge in one of the country's official languages.

Fiji was previously a colony of the British Empire and local residents were British subjects. Although Fiji gained independence in 1970 and Fijians no longer hold British nationality, they continue to have favoured status when residing in the United Kingdom; as Commonwealth citizens, Fijians are eligible to vote in UK elections and serve in public office there.

== Terminology ==
The distinction between the meaning of the terms citizenship and nationality is not always clear in the English language and differs by country. Generally, nationality refers to a person's legal belonging to a sovereign state and is the common term used in international treaties when addressing members of a country, while citizenship usually means the set of rights and duties a person has in that nation. This distinction is clearly defined in non-English speaking countries but not in the Anglosphere. In the United Kingdom and Commonwealth of Nations, the two terms are often used interchangeably.

== History ==
=== Colonial-era context ===
The archipelago of Fiji was first united in 1871 as the Kingdom of Fiji. From 1860, European settlers had established a plantation economy heavily dependent on the cotton trade, creating a demand for importing cheap labour from abroad. Internal security issues stemming from sustained conflict between settlers and native residents, heavy government debt, and rapid growth of an illicit labour trade prompted the king to offer the islands over to British control. The United Kingdom annexed the territory in 1874, establishing the Colony of Fiji. The colony was later expanded in 1881 with the addition of Rotuma. British nationality law applied to the colony, as was the case elsewhere in the British Empire. Fijians and all other imperial citizens were British subjects; any person born in Fiji, the United Kingdom, or anywhere else within Crown dominions was a natural-born British subject.

British nationality law during this time was uncodified and did not have a standard set of regulations, relying instead on precedent and common law. Until the mid-19th century, it was unclear whether naturalisation rules in the United Kingdom were applicable in other parts of the Empire. Each colony had wide discretion in developing their own procedures and requirements for admitting foreign settlers as subjects. In 1847, the Imperial Parliament formalised a clear distinction between subjects who naturalised in the UK and those who did so in other territories. Individuals who naturalised in the UK were deemed to have received the status by imperial naturalisation, which was valid throughout the Empire. Those naturalising in colonies were said to have gone through local naturalisation and were given subject status valid only within the relevant territory; a subject who locally naturalised in New South Wales was a British subject there, but not in England or Fiji. Nevertheless, locally naturalised British subjects were still entitled to imperial protection when travelling outside of the Empire.

Individuals living in or intending to reside in Fiji could petition for a grant of naturalisation with the governor. There was no minimum residence requirement and applicants simply needed approval from the governor. British subjects who had already been naturalised in the United Kingdom or other parts of the Empire could apply to be naturalised again in Fiji without swearing an oath of allegiance if they had previously taken one. Foreign women who married British subjects were considered to have automatically naturalised under the new regulations.

The Federal Council of Australasia, created in 1885, was a first attempt at forming a unified governing body in the Australasian region and consisted of Fiji along with four colonies on the Australian mainland (Queensland, Tasmania, Victoria, and Western Australia). Legislation passed by the Federal Council in 1897 allowed British subjects who had naturalised in a colony under its authority to be considered as naturalised in other such colonies, though the body was dissolved just three years later in 1900.

Large numbers of indentured Indian labourers were recruited to work in Fiji beginning in 1879. While immigration was initially slow, the pace of migration grew steadily as sugar plantations expanded their operations on the islands. After five years of service, indentured workers could opt to renew their contracts for a further five years, after which they had the option of returning to India at government expense or lease small plots of land from native Fijians for cultivation. By 1912, there were over 50,000 Indians resident in Fiji. Widespread opposition in India to the harsh working conditions of indenture system eventually led to its abolition in 1920.

Despite the ban on indentured labour, immigrants from India continued to relocate to Fiji in search of economic opportunity. However, this migration was severely imbalanced and consisted almost entirely of men; just over six per cent of Indian migrants were women. Beginning in 1930, Indian men were restricted from entering Fiji. The colonial administration additionally requested that the Indian government refuse to issue passports to any men attempting to enter Fiji unaccompanied by their wives, or otherwise without the express permission of the Fijian government. A yearly maximum of 500 to 700 Indian migrants allowed into the territory was set in 1931, later reduced to 350 persons in 1938. The local government also halted issuing Fijian passports to any Indian other than those who were born in the colony, had entered as indentured workers and remained resident, or had already resided in Fiji for at least 10 years and were permanently employed.

A constitutional revision in Fiji in 1936 assured that though there were more Indo-Fijians in the population than indigenous Fijians, the rights and interests of the native population were paramount and were protected under law. The Legislative Council under terms of the 1936 Constitution gave five representatives each to Fijian, European, and Indo-Fijian constituencies and would remain in effect for over twenty-five years.

Imperial nationality law was comprehensively reformed in 1948. The British Nationality Act 1948 redefined British subject to mean any citizen of the United Kingdom, its colonies, or other Commonwealth countries. Commonwealth citizen was first defined in this Act to have the same meaning. While previously all subjects of the Empire held a common status through allegiance to the Crown, each Commonwealth country under the reformed system became responsible for legislating their own nationality laws and would maintain a common status by voluntarily agreement among all the member states. British subjects under the previous meaning who held that status on 1 January 1949 because of a connection with the United Kingdom or a remaining colony (including Fiji) became Citizens of the United Kingdom and Colonies (CUKC).

The Fijian Affairs Ordinance of 1944 reestablished the former Native Regulations Board calling it the Fijian Affairs Board and granting it more powers. The board tied the Fijian members of the Executive Council, the Legislative Council, the Great Council of Chiefs, and a legal advisor to control the administration of Fijian affairs. During the war years, Europeans sought to form a solidarity with the Fijian leadership to prevent Indo-Fijian domination because of their greater numbers. In 1961 to dismantle the remaining forced labour systems, regulations were passed to eliminate communal obligations and grant provincial councils regulating authority. Direct elections of members of the Legislative Council occurred after 1963 constitutional amendment which gave each constituency (European, Fijian, Indo-Fijian) a fairly equal number of electors with a majority of one for Fijians. From the early 1960s, Britain began pressing towards Fijian self-government and independence.

=== Post-independence period (1970–present) ===
Fiji gained independence on 10 October 1970. Generally, persons who had previously been nationals as defined under the classification of "Citizens of the UK and Colonies", would become nationals of Fiji on Independence Day and cease to be British nationals. Exceptions were made for persons to retain their British nationality and status if they (or their father or grandfather) were born, naturalised, or registered in a part of the realm which remained on 10 October part of the United Kingdom or colonies, or had been annexed by such a place. Other exceptions included that wives of CUKCs did not lose their status as a CUKC unless their husband lost his status at independence. Under the terms of the 1970 Fiji Independence Order, the only people who did not automatically become nationals at independence were those who could only derive nationality from their mother or from a grandparent. The constitution defined Fijians as descendants of indigenous people from Fiji, or the islands of Melanesia, Micronesia, or Polynesia, or Indians whose ancestors originated in the Indian subcontinent. Subsequent to independence, the Legislature passed the Citizenship Act of 1971, which contained additional provisions for acquisition of nationality.

In 1987, a coalition government formed by Timoci Bavadra, which had a majority of Indo-Fijian ministers, was overthrown by a coup d'état. The Monarchy of Fiji was replaced with a Republican government and the constitution lapsed. Because of the suspension of the legislature, until 1990, the head of state ruled by decree. In 1990, a new constitution which guaranteed the primacy of the interests and institutions of indigenous Fijians was adopted. The legislature was composed of one representative for Rotuma, five general representatives, twenty-seven Indo-Fijian representatives and thirty-seven Fijian members. Chinese, European, Melanesian, and Polynesian inhabitants were unacknowledged by identity and limited to the five general seats. The Great Council of Chiefs was elevated to a position above the law and beyond oversight mechanisms. It was recognised at the time that the 1990 Constitution was an interim document and in 1995 a Constitutional Review Commission was appointed.

The 1997 Constitution attempted to eliminate provisions for ethnic dominance and replace them with systems that created a united national identity. To that end, activists involved in the Fiji Women's Rights Movement focused on ensuring that a Bill of Rights was included in the new constitution and that gender discrimination was addressed. At the time, the provisions for nationality only allowed legitimate children to derive nationality through a father, unless the child's grandfather (father of its native-born mother, who was married to a foreigner), had been Fijian. Illegitimate children could only derive nationality from their mother. Foreign husbands of Fijian women were not eligible for residency or naturalization on the basis of their marriage, but foreign wives were automatically eligible to be registered upon marriage with a Fijian husband. The efforts of women's groups were successful in eliminating gender inequalities from the nationality provisions in the 1997 Constitution.

Subsequently the 2000 and 2006 coup d'états suspended the 1997 constitution. (Note: The 2000 coup suspended the constitution but a Supreme Court decision reinstated it in 2001.) In 2007, Laisenia Qarase instituted legal proceedings challenging the validity of the coup. The following year the High Court of Fiji, consisting of appointees of the coup leadership, upheld the legality of the coup and an appeal of the decision was filed. The Court of Appeal of Fiji in 2009 reversed the prior ruling, noting that the doctrine of necessity could not be used to justify a coup, nor did the terms of the constitution allow the president to dismiss the Prime Minister except under vary narrow circumstances as determined by a vote of no confidence of the legislature. Upon release of the appellate court's ruling, President Josefa Iloilo revoked the constitution. That same year, Citizenship of Fiji Decree (later known as the Citizenship of Fiji Act, 2009) was passed consolidating all the nationality statutes in the country. Public consultations on a new constitution began in 2012 and it was adopted in 2013. The definitions of nationals and acquiring nationality under the 2009 Citizenship Act remained in force, but the new constitution allowed for dual nationality.

== Acquisition and loss of nationality ==
Any person born in Fiji, other than those born between 1990 and 1997, automatically receives citizenship at birth regardless of the nationalities of their parents. Individuals born while the 1990 Constitution of Fiji was in force only received Fijian citizenship at birth if at least one parent was a Fijian citizen. Children born to foreign government officials with diplomatic immunity are not usually citizens at birth, unless one or both parents are also Fijian citizens. Abandoned children found in the country are presumed to have been born in Fiji and are considered Fijian citizens by birth.

Individuals born overseas to at least one Fijian citizen parent are eligible to acquire Fijian citizenship by registration. Registrants aged 18 or older are required to have resided in the country for least three of the five years preceding their application. Spouses of Fijian citizens may also register as citizens after fulfilling the same residence requirement.

Foreigners may naturalise as Fijian citizens after residing in the country for at least five of the previous 10 years immediately preceding an application. Applicants must intend to continue residence in Fiji, demonstrate sufficient knowledge in one of the country's official languages, fulfill a good character requirement, and take an oath of loyalty to the state. Minor children of successfully naturalised Fijians may acquire citizenship by registration. Children adopted by Fijian citizens are also eligible to be registered to citizens.

Fijian citizenship can be relinquished by making a declaration of renunciation, provided that the declarant already possesses another nationality. Citizenship may be involuntarily deprived from individuals who fraudulently acquired it or from those who commit acts of disloyalty against the state. Holding multiple citizenships has been permitted in Fijian law since 2009. Former Fijian citizens who lost their citizenship as a result of acquiring a foreign nationality may subsequently apply to be re-registered as Fijian citizens, subject to discretionary approval.
