= Master of the High Court of Fiji =

Masters of the High Court are judges authorised by the Fijian Constitution to sit on the High Court. Unlike the more senior puisne judges, who sit on both the High Court and the Court of Appeal, Masters of the High Court sit only on the High Court. The Master of the High Court's power is prescribed by the High Court Act and Order 59 of the Fijian High Court Rules 1988.

The first Master of the High Court of Fiji was Janmai Jay Udit. He was appointed in 2005. His appointment was revoked on abrogation of the 1997 constitution on 10 April 2009, together with all other judges and magistrates.

In 2024, Preetika Prasad was sworn in as Master of the High Court.

== See also ==
- Constitution of Fiji: Chapter 9 (detailing the composition and role of the judiciary)
