= William Calanchini =

Judge of the Supreme Court of Fiji
- Incumbent
- Assumed office 17 April 2023

President of the Court of Appeal of Fiji
- In office 1 August 2013 – 31 December 2019

William Desmond Calanchini is an Australian jurist who served as President of the Court of Appeal of Fiji from 2013 to 2019. In 2023, he was appointed as a judge of the Supreme Court of Fiji.

Calanchini was educated at the University of Melbourne, graduating with a bachelor of laws in 1972. He was admitted to the bar of the Australian state of Victoria in 1974, and in Fiji in 1999. He worked as deputy Solicitor General of Fiji from 1998 to 2002. He then worked as a lawyer for the Republic of Fiji Military Forces, and then as a permanent arbitrator.

In June 2009, following the 2009 Fijian constitutional crisis and the dismissal of Fiji's entire judiciary, he was appointed to the High Court of Fiji as a puisne judge by the military regime. While serving on the High Court he presided over contempt of court cases designed to stifle opposition to the military regime.

From February 2012 to July 2013, he was acting President of the Court of Appeal of Fiji. From 1 August 2013 to 31 December 2019, he was its president.

In April 2023, he was appointed as a judge of the Supreme Court of Fiji. In August 2023, he was appointed to the tribunal convened to investigate allegations of misbehaviour against Chief Justice Kamal Kumar.
