= Saleem Marsoof =

The Honourable Saleem Marsoof PC

Justice of the Supreme Court of Fiji
- In office January 2011 – October 2021

Puisne Justice of the Supreme Court of Sri Lanka
- In office January 2005 – December 2014

33rd President of the Court of Appeal of Sri Lanka
- In office 31 March 2004 – 19 January 2005
- Appointed by: Chandrika Kumaratunga

Personal details
- Education: University of Colombo, University of San Diego School of Law, Zahira College, Colombo

Saleem Marsoof, PC is a Sri Lankan judge and lawyer. He is a judge of the Supreme Court of Sri Lanka and former President of the Court of Appeal. He is also a non-resident Justice of Appeal of the Supreme Court of Fiji.

== Education ==
Marsoof was educated at Arethusa College, Wellawatte, Zahira College, Colombo and at Royal College Colombo. In 1971, he graduated from the University of Ceylon Colombo campus, with a Bachelor of Laws Degree (LLB) winning the Gate Mudaliyar Edmund Pieris prize awarded for academic excellence, and after passing the Final Examination at Sri Lanka Law College for the Admission of Advocates held in October 1973, was admitted to the Bar as an Attorney-at-law of the Supreme Court of Sri Lanka in June 1974. He holds two degrees of Master of Laws (LLM) awarded by the University of Colombo in 1984 and the University of San Diego School of Law, California, in 1990. He has been the recipient of fellowships awarded by the British Council, the Commonwealth Secretariat and the World Intellectual Property Organization (WIPO) for study and training in various areas of law, and in 1996, he was awarded the Nuffield Commonwealth Fellowship by the Nuffield Foundation, London, for study and research at the Institute of Advanced Legal Studies of the University of London, which enabled him also to gain first hand work experience on takeovers and mergers at the Panel on Takeovers and Mergers, London.

Being a prolific writer, Marsoof is the principal editor of the volume entitled In Pursuit of Justice: Corde Et Amino and the author of the book The Quazi Court System in Sri Lanka and its Impact on Muslim Women. He has been an editor of the Colombo Law Review, the Jura Newsletter, The Attorney General's Journal and the Chairman of the Panel of Editors of the Law College Law Review. He also has to his credit, several book chapters and a large number of articles on a variety of important legal topics.

== Legal career ==
In 1975 he joined the Attorney General's Department as a State Counsel, and was promoted as senior state counsel in 1983 and appointed to the post of deputy Solicitor General in 1993. In 1998 he was made additional solicitor general, and in the same year, in recognition of his eminence in the bar, he was awarded silk and was appointed a President's Counsel. He was elevation to the judiciary in 2004 as the president of the Court of Appeal of Sri Lanka, after spending 29 in the official bar, and at the time of his elevation, he functioned as the seniormost additional solicitor general in-charge of the Civil Division of that department.

Marsoof has contributed by being a lecturer in law at the Sri Lanka Law College, the Institute of Advanced Legal Studies, Colombo, the Law Faulty of the University of Colombo, the Open University of Sri Lanka, the University of Kelaniya, Institute of Chartered Accountants of Sri Lanka and the Bandaranaike Centre for International Studies. Marsoof has been the chairman of the board of examiners of the ICLP Arbitration Centre, the pioneer arbitration centre in Sri Lanka. He is currently an elected member of the faculty board of the law faculty of the University of Colombo, and a member of the board of management of the Judges Institute of Sri Lanka.

Marsoof has been a sought after speaker in Sri Lanka and abroad. He regularly addresses the International Symposium on Economic Crime organised by Jesus College, Cambridge and was invited to make the Dr. A. M. A. Azeez Memorial Oration in 2002. He also made a keynote address at the International Conference organised by the Kuala Lumpur Regional Arbitration Center in collaboration with UNCITRAL to celebrate 30 years of the UNCITRAL Arbitration Rules in Kuala Lumpur, Malaysia in 2006. He made the famous Inaugural K.C Kamalasabayson Memorial Oration in 2008 and the prestigious Inaugural Institute of Advanced Legal Studies Oration in 2009, and was invited by the Sri Lanka Malay Association to make the Dr. T.B.Jayah Memorial Oration in 2010.

== Judiciary ==
In March 2004, Marsoof was elevated to the judiciary in the capacity as the President of the Court of Appeal of Sri Lanka. He delivered a large number of landmark judgments particularly on constitutional and administrative law issues during his very short stay at the helm of the Court of Appeal. In February 2005, he was promoted as a Judge of the Supreme Court of Sri Lanka, which is the apex court of the country, which position he still holds. His dedication and erudition has enabled him to distinguishing himself as one of the most independent and respected judges of that Court.

In 2014, Marsoof was appointed as Acting Chief Justice of Sri Lanka.

Apart from his judicial work, Marsoof has been involved in social mobility and law reform initiatives, and is currently the Chairman of the Committee appointed by the Government to suggest amendments to the Muslim Marriage and Divorce Act in force in Sri Lanka.

Marsoof was a Judge on the Supreme Court of Fiji from 2011-2015.
