= President of the Court of Appeal of Fiji =

Fiji's Court of Appeal is chaired by the President of the Court of Appeal. The Chief Justice of Fiji is not permitted to hold this position; in order to give the Court of Appeal a degree of independence from the High Court and the Supreme Court, the Chief Justice, who chairs both courts, is constitutionally disqualified from presiding over, or even sitting on, the Court of Appeal.

The following persons have served as President of the Court of Appeal since it was established in 1999.

President of the Court of Appeal	Term of office
Jai Ram Reddy	2000
Sir Timoci Tuivaga [1]	2000 - 2 March 2001
vacant	2001–2002
Jai Ram Reddy	2002–2003
Gordon Ward	2003–2007; following the December 2006 military coup, Sir Gordon Ward and five other judges resigned as judges of the courts of Fiji.
Court of Appeals panel of 3 judges was appointed in 2009	In April 2009 the court found that the 2006 coup had been illegal, which triggered the 2009 Fijian constitutional crisis. Following the ruling the President of Fiji suspended the country's constitution and removed all judges from office.
William Calanchini	9 February 2012 — 31 July 2013 (acting); 1 August 2013 — 31 December 2019
[1] Although the Chief Justice is not allowed to preside over the Court of Appeal, an anomaly existed in 2000–2001, owing to the suspension of the Constitution by the Interim Military Government in the wake of the Fiji coup of 2000. Accordingly, the Chief Justice, Sir Timoci Tuivaga, assumed the Presidency of the Court of Appeal until constitutional arrangements were restored in March 2001.
Isikeli Mataitoga	20 January 2025 - present

== See also ==
- Constitution of Fiji: Chapter 9 (detailing the composition and role of the judiciary)
