= Calanchini =

Calanchini is a surname. Notable people with the surname include:

- Giampaolo Calanchini (1937–2007), Italian fencer
- William Calanchini, Australian jurist
