= Puisne judge of Fiji =

Puisne judges in Fiji sit on the High Court and the Court of Appeal, but not on the Supreme Court. According to the now-abrogated Chapter 9 of the Fijian 1997 Constitution, there must be a minimum of 10 puisne judges, who are appointed by the President on the nomination of the Judicial Service Commission, who must first consult the appropriate Cabinet Minister and the committee of the House of Representatives responsible for the administration of justice.

A puisne judge must be a qualified barrister or solicitor with a minimum of seven years' experience in Fiji or another country prescribed by law, or one who holds or has held a high judicial position in Fiji or another country prescribed by Parliament. The judiciary is the only branch of government from which non-citizens are not excluded. This is in recognition that as a developing country, the government may deem it in the national interest to look abroad for judges with expertise in various aspects of the law. Accordingly, judges from the United Kingdom, Australia, and New Zealand, among other countries, have sometimes served on Fiji's courts.

Puisne judges are appointed for terms between four and seven years, and are required to retire on the expiry of their term or at the age of 65, whichever event occurs sooner. The retirement age for puisne judges, unlike that of other judges, may not be waived. They are eligible, however, for subsequent appointment to other judicial positions, such as Justice of Appeal (including President of the Court of Appeal), Supreme Court justice, or Chief Justice. In addition, compulsory retirement at age 65 does not disqualify such a person from temporarily acting as a puisne. Judges who are past retirement age may therefore be called out of retirement, from time to time, to temporarily fill vacancies or to act in the place of a judge who is absent or otherwise unable to perform his or her duties.

== See also ==
- Constitution of Fiji: Chapter 9 (detailing the composition and role of the judiciary)
