= Inia Seruiratu =

Fijian politician

The Honourable Inia Seruiratu MP
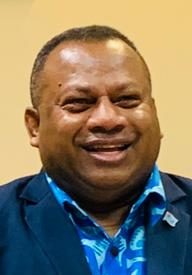
- Seruiratu in 2019

Leader of the Opposition
- Incumbent
- Assumed office 29 March 2023
- Prime Minister: Sitiveni Rabuka
- Deputy: Parveen Bala
- Preceded by: Frank Bainimarama

Leader of the People First Party
- Incumbent
- Assumed office 19 January 2026
- Prime Minister: Sitiveni Rabuka
- Deputy: Jone Usamate
- Preceded by: Office Esb.
Ministerial positions
Minister for Defence, National Security and Policing
In office 22 November 2018 – 24 December 2022
Prime Minister	Frank Bainimarama
Preceded by	Inoke Kubuabola
Succeeded by	Pio Tikoduadua
Minister for Agriculture
In office 22 November 2018 – 24 December 2022
Prime Minister	Frank Bainimarama
Preceded by	Inoke Kubuabola
Succeeded by	Pio Tikoduadua
Minister of Foreign Affairs
In office 28 January 2019 – 21 April 2020
Prime Minister	Frank Bainimarama
Preceded by	Frank Bainimarama
Succeeded by	Frank Bainimarama
Minister for Rural and Maritime Development
In office 21 April 2020 – 24 December 2022
Prime Minister	Frank Bainimarama
Preceded by	Mahendra Reddy
Succeeded by	Sakiasi Ditoka
Minister for Disaster Management
In office 21 April 2020 – 24 December 2022
President	Jioji Konrote
Prime Minister	Frank Bainimarama
Preceded by	Jone Usamate
Succeeded by	Sakiasi Ditoka

Personal details
- Party: People First Party
- Other political affiliations: FijiFirst (until 2024)
- Spouse: Litea Vulakoro
- Children: 3

Military service
- Allegiance: Fiji
- Branch/service: Fiji Infantry Regiment
- Years of service: 1987–2014
- Rank: Colonel

Inia Batikoto Seruiratu is a Fijian politician and member of the Parliament of Fiji for the FijiFirst party. He has been serving as the Opposition Leader.

Seruiratu was first elected to Parliament at the 2014 Fijian general election and appointed Minister for Agriculture and Natural Disaster Management.

He was re-elected in 2018 with 1,251 votes, and appointed Minister of Defence and National Security. In January 2019 he was appointed Minister of Foreign Affairs. In April 2020 the Foreign Affairs portfolio returned to Prime Minister Frank Bainimarama, and Seruiratu was instead appointed Minister for Rural and Maritime Development and Minister for Disaster Management.

On 29 March 2023, he was elected as the Leader of Opposition, replacing Frank Bainimarama.

On 28 April 2020, Seruiratu delivered a speech celebrating the first arrival of Fiji's recently commissioned RFNS Savenaca to its homeport of Walu Bay.

Following the collapse of FijiFirst, Seruiratu remained in parliament as an independent. As leader of the Group of 16 Bloc, the largest non-government grouping, he remained leader of the opposition.
