= Joe Rokocoko =

New Zealand rugby player (born 1983)

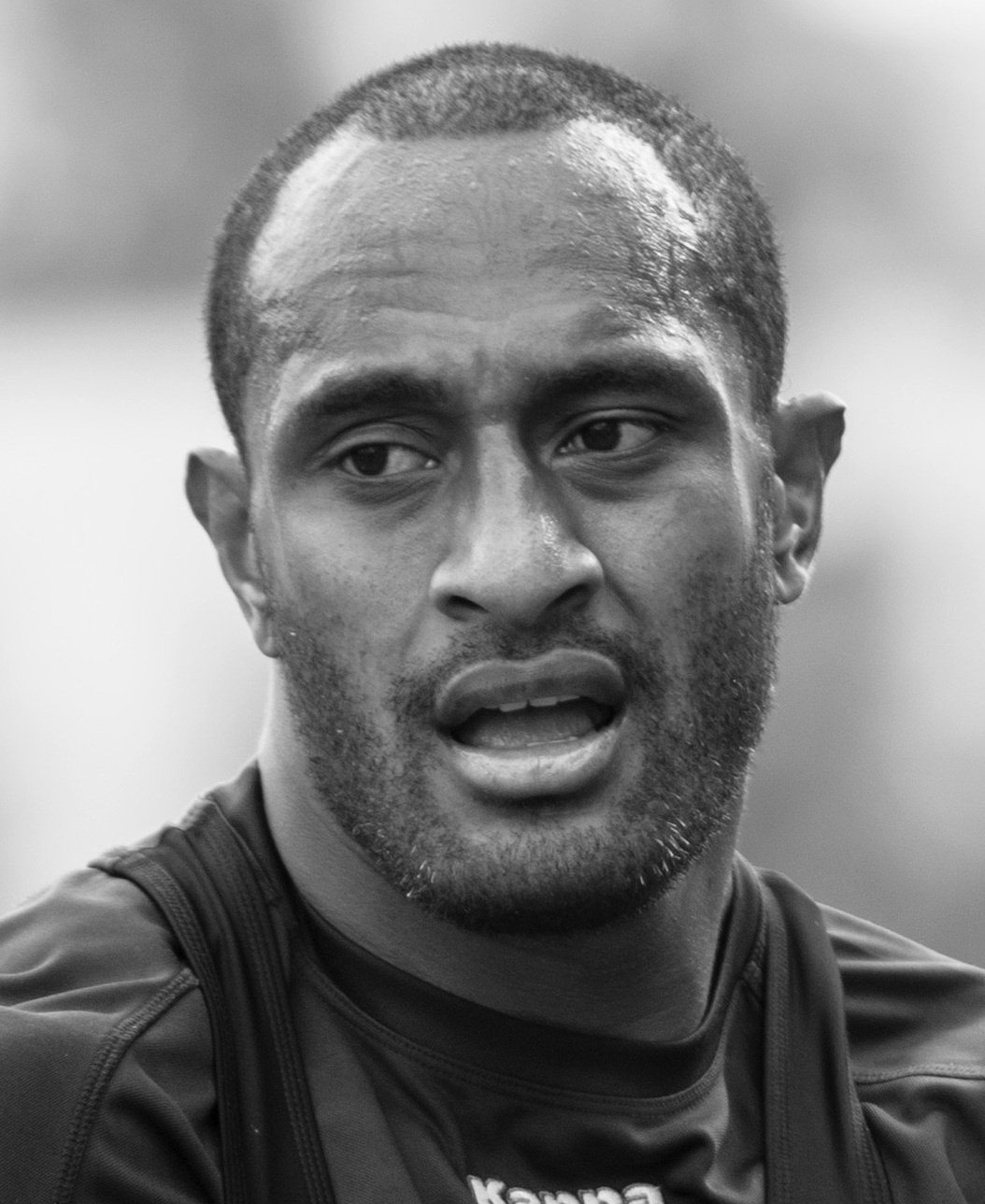
- Rococoko in 2015
- Full name: Josevata Taliga Rokocoko
- Born: 6 June 1983 (age 43) Nadi, Fiji
- Height: 188 cm (6 ft 2 in)
- Weight: 104 kg (229 lb; 16 st 5 lb)
- School: St. Kentigern College
- Notable relative: Joeli Vidiri (cousin)

Rugby union career
- Position: Wing
- Current team: Racing 92
Senior career
Years	Team	Apps	(Points)
2003–2011	Blues	96	(195)
2002–2011	Auckland	38	(80)
2012–2015	Bayonne	98	(120)
2015–2019	Racing 92	87	(65)
- Correct as of 22 April 2019
International career
Years	Team	Apps	(Points)
2002	New Zealand U21	3	(15)
2003–2010	New Zealand	68	(230)
2005	Junior All Blacks	3	(25)
- Correct as of 22 April 2019

Josevata Taliga "Joe" Rokocoko (pronounced [rokoˈðoko], born 6 June 1983) is a New Zealand former professional rugby union player, who played as a wing.

Born in Fiji, Rokocoko grew up in New Zealand and played for the Blues and Auckland. He later played for French clubs Bayonne and Racing 92.

He won 68 caps for New Zealand between 2003 and 2010, and scored 46 tries. He is New Zealand's joint-third-top try scorer.

== Early life ==
Born 6 June 1983 in Nadi, Fiji, Rokocoko migrated to New Zealand with his family at the age of 5, settling in Weymouth, South Auckland, and he attended James Cook High School. Rokocoko later won a scholarship to Saint Kentigern College, where he was a member of the 2001 National Secondary Schools team. After an outstanding career with New Zealand international sides at the under-16, under-19, and under-21 level, he started playing Super 12 rugby.

== Playing career ==
Rokocoko played for the Blues in the 2003 Super 12 season. He made his first appearance for the All Blacks on 14 June 2003 against England. He had a high strike rate for the All Blacks, scoring 25 tries in his first 20 tests, and breaking the All Blacks single-season record for test tries previously shared by Jonah Lomu and Christian Cullen—his 17 test tries scored in 2003 is the highest for any player in one season. The International Rugby Players' Association named him new player of the year in 2003. His incredible speed has been seen many times throughout his career. On 19 June 2004, in the All Blacks' second 2004 test with England, Rokocoko shredded the England defence for three tries in a 36–12 All Blacks victory over the reigning Rugby World Cup champions.

Rokocoko returned to the All Blacks line-up for the 2005 Tri Nations Series, punctuating his comeback with a two-try effort in the All Blacks' pivotal home fixture against South Africa. By the end of the 2006 season he had scored 35 tries in 39 test matches – and in total scored 46 tries with the All Blacks in 68 tests, including 4 hat-tricks: against France (2003), Australia (2003), England (2004) and Romania (2007). He scored his first try since the 2007 Rugby World Cup against Italy in June 2009.

In 2011, after 68 games for New Zealand and 96 for the Blues, he signed with Aviron Bayonnais of the Top 14. He played for Aviron Bayonnais for a total of four seasons, where he made a positional switch from wing to centre during his time there. In July 2015, it was announced that Rokocoko had signed a contract with Racing Metro 92, and will link up with a host of other New Zealanders plying their trade at this club in Paris. He debuted for them on Friday 21 August 2015, where Racing Metro recorded an emphatic victory over Toulon at Stade Mayol in Toulon. In the final of the 2015–16 Top 14 season Rokocoko scored a try as Racing defeated Toulon.

== Personal life ==
Although often known as Joe, Rokocoko asked New Zealand rugby management to list his Christian birth name, Josevata, on team releases.

He is a cousin of former Auckland Blues and All Black winger Joeli Vidiri and New Zealand sevens player Iliesa Tanivula. He and fellow All Black wing Sitiveni Sivivatu regard themselves as cousins because Sivivatu lived with the Rokocoko family, but they are not blood relations.

In January 2008, Rokocoko married Beverly Politini, the daughter of Howard Politini, a Major in the Fiji Military, at a wedding attended by a large number of All Blacks. They have a son called Cypress Rokocoko.

== Honours ==
(France) Racing 92

- Top 14: 2015–16

Super 12

Blues

Champions 2003
