= Neil Sharma =

Fijian politician

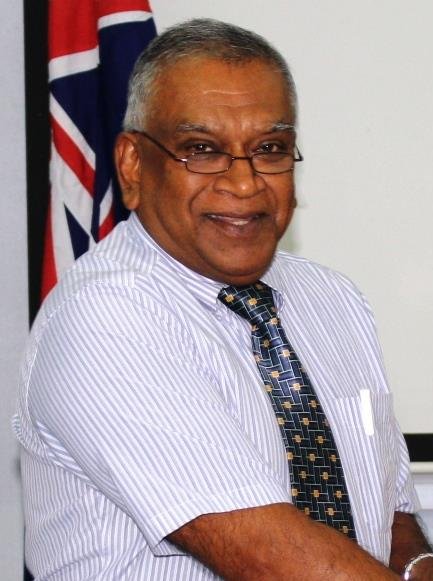
Sharma in 2014

Neil Prakash Sharma (born 1955, in Suva) is a Fijian former politician, who served as the Minister for Health in the interim Cabinet formed by Frank Bainimarama between 2009 and 2014.

== Career ==
The son of civil servant and MP Chandra Prakash Sharma, Sharma studied at Holy Trinity Anglican School for his primary education and Marist Brothers High School between 1968 and 1971. He worked at the CWM Hospital in Suva in the early 80's as an OB/GYN resident in training. He holds an MBBS as well as a post-graduate Certificate in Women's Health and a Post Graduate diploma in Obstetrics from the University of the South Pacific and Fiji School of Medicine. He worked as a Specialist Obstetrician and Gynaecologist at the Suva Private Hospital between 2000 and 2009.

He was appointed the Minister for Health in January 2009. He replaced former Minister for Health, Dr. Jiko Luveni who took up another portfolio as Minister for Women.

He joined Frank Bainimarama's FijiFirst Party and was named as one of the first 21 candidates for the party in the upcoming general elections.

On 10 April 2015 Sharma resigned from Parliament. He was replaced by Jilila Kumar.
