= Mosese Bulitavu =

Fijian politician

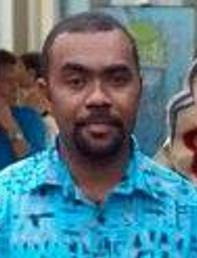
Bulitavu in 2016

Mosese Drecala Bulitavu is a Fijian politician and Member of the Parliament of Fiji. He is the current Minister for Environment & Climate Change.

In October 2011 Bulitavu was charged with sedition for graffiting billboards with anti-government slogans. In March 2018 Bulitavu was convicted, and subsequently sentenced to more than two years' jail. The conviction was overturned on appeal, and a retrial ordered in August 2018. The prosecution was discontinued in 2019.

Bulitavu ran in the 2014 elections as a SODELPA candidate, winning 6276 votes, making him the 4th highest-polling SODELPA candidate. He was re-elected in the 2018 election, winning 5342 votes.

On 4 July 2019, Bulitavu made racist statements on his Facebook page that stabbing and killing was something the iTaukei community learned from the 'vulagi', those who were brought in from India. Bulitavu was subsequently condemned by Prime Minister Frank Bainimarama and by other members of the SODELPA party, and was subsequently questioned by police over allegations of hate speech.

In August 2021, SODELPA sought to have Bulitavu's seat declared vacant for supporting the government budget and the iTaukei Land Trust Act (Bill No. 17). The Court of Disputed Returns dismissed the party's case.

In June 2022, Bulitavu announced that he might leave SODELPA for the 2022 general election. SODELPA general secretary Lenaitasi Duru confirmed in October 2022 that Bulitavu was still a SODELPA member, and that he had unsuccessfully sought the party's nomination. On 30 October, Bulitavu was named as part of the FijiFirst candidate list. He won reelection with 631 votes, ranking 25th out of FijiFirst's 26 elected seats. FijiFirst went into opposition after the opposition parties, including SODELPA, formed a coalition government. Following the collapse and deregistration of FijiFirst he remained in parliament as an independent, but said that he would support the government of Sitiveni Rabuka. On 10 January 2025, he was sworn as Minister of Environment & Climate Change under Rabuka's government.
