= Isikeli Mataitoga =

Fijian diplomat, ambassador

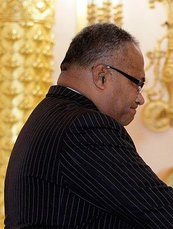
Isikeli Mataitoga in February 2010.

Isikeli Uluinairai Mataitoga is a Fijian jurist and former diplomat who has been serving as President of the Court of Appeal of Fiji since 20 January 2025.

He was the former ambassador of Fiji to Japan, he was concurrently the non-resident ambassador to the Philippines, Russia, Vietnam and non-resident high commissioner to Brunei. He presented his credentials to Japanese emperor Akihito at the Tokyo Imperial Palace on 13 January 2010, to Russian president Dmitry Medvedev at the Moscow Kremlin on 5 February 2010, and then to Philippines President Benigno Aquino III at the Malacañang Palace on 10 January 2013. He presented his credentials to Vietnamese president HE Mr. Tran Dai Quang on 9 November 2016. He presented his credentials to His Majesty Sultan Haji Hassanal Bolkiah Mu’izzaddin Waddaulah in 2019.

Prior to his appointment as Fiji's ambassador to Japan, Mataitoga held several other senior government appointments. His previous appointments include: the director of public prosecutions of Fiji (from 1988 to 1993), the Solicitor-General of Fiji (from 1993 to 1996), Fiji's ambassador to Australia and Singapore (from 1996 to 1998), Fiji's ambassador to the European Union and Fiji's Permanent Representative to the World Trade Organisation, UNESCO & FAO (from 1998 to 2004), chief executive officer of the Ministry of Foreign Affairs Fiji (from 2004 to 2007) and a Judge of the High Court of Fiji (from 2007 to 2009).

Preceded by Ratu Inoke Kubuabola	Ambassador of Fiji to Japan; 2009–2021	Succeeded by -
Preceded by Post created	Non-Resident Ambassador of Fiji to Russia; 2010–2021	Succeeded by -
Preceded by Post created	Non-Resident Ambassador of Fiji to the Philippines; 2013–2021	Succeeded by -
Preceded by Post Created	Non-Resident Ambassador of Fiji to Vietnam; 2016-2021	Succeeded by -
Preceded by Post Created	Non-Resident High Commissioner of Fiji to Brunei; 2019-2021	Succeeded by -
