= Jilila Kumar =

Fijian politician

Jilila Nalibu Kumar (born 1959) is a Fijian politician of Indian descent and a member of the Parliament of Fiji. She is a member of the FijiFirst party.

Kumar was born in Sigatoka Valley and educated at Fulton College before becoming a teacher. She had a long career as a teacher, eventually serving as Principal of Jasper Williams High School in Lautoka.

Kumar was named as a FijiFirst candidate on 15 August 2014. In the 2014 election she received 824 votes, but fell just short of entering parliament.

Kumar entered parliament as the next candidate on FijiFirst's list following the resignation of Dr Neil Sharma. She was appointed Assistant Minister for Education, Heritage and Arts, but lost the position after just one week. She was not selected by FijiFirst as a candidate for the 2018 election.
