= Timoci Natuva =

Fijian politician

Timoci Natuva OF (MIL)
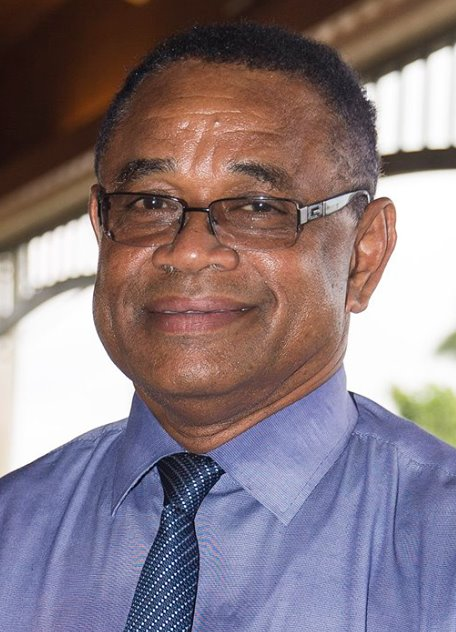
- Natuva in 2016

Minister for Immigration, National Security and Defence
- In office 25 September 2014 – 31 August 2016
- Succeeded by: Frank Bainimarama (Acting)

Personal details
- Born: 17 July 1957 (age 69) Wainibokasi, Naitasiri
- Party: FijiFirst
- Spouse: Mereani Natuva
- Children: Four children

Colonel Timoci Lesikivatukoula Natuva OF (MIL) (born 1957 in Wainibokasi, Tailevu) is a former Fijian politician and Member of the Parliament of Fiji. He has previously served as Minister for Immigration, National Security and Defence.

Natuva is a former Colonel in the Republic of Fiji Military Forces. He holds a Master of Arts in Strategic Studies from Deakin University. He attended Sawani Village School and later Lelean Memorial School. He has had over 30 years of military experience. Between 1989 and 1990, he Company Commandered with 2FIR in Sinai. He was appointed Chief Operations Officer Civil Military Affairs at the UNTAET in Dili, East Timor and Darwin, Australia, and between 1992 and 1993, he was appointed Military Advisor to the UN Secretary General in Afghanistan and Pakistan. In 2001, he assumed the position of Chief-of-Staff of the United Nations Interim Force in Lebanon (UNIFIL). In 2007 he was appointed to be Contingent Commander of the First Fiji Infantry Regiment, Fiji Guard Unit for the United Nations Assistance Mission for Iraq (UNAMI).

Natuva has attended various institutions including Royal Australian Naval College, Asia Pacific Centre for Security Studies at Honolulu, Naval and the Post Graduate School at Monterey, California. He is also a Fellow of the Australian Defence College of Strategic Studies at Canberra, Australia.

Natuva was elected to Parliament in the 2014 election, in which he won 2,691 votes. He was appointed to Cabinet as Minister for Immigration, National Security and Defence in September 2014. in August 2016 he resigned as a Minister in order to spend more time with his family. He was replaced as an MP by Howard Politini.
