= One Fiji Party =

- Registered: August 2014
- Dissolved: April 19, 2017

One Fiji Party (OFP) was a registered political party in Fiji. It was registered as a political party in August 2014.

== History ==
The party's president for the 2014 Fijian general election was Sitiveni Suvaki. During elections held on 17 September 2014, the party received 5,839 votes, representing 1.20% of the total number of voters, coming sixth overall and not qualifying for any parliamentary representation in the 50-member Fijian Parliament.

In February 2017, the One Fiji Party was suspended for 30 days for not submitting its audited accounts.

The party was de-registered on 19 April 2017 by the Fiji elections office due to the party failing to submit its audited accounts.
