= Joeli Cawaki =

Fijian politician

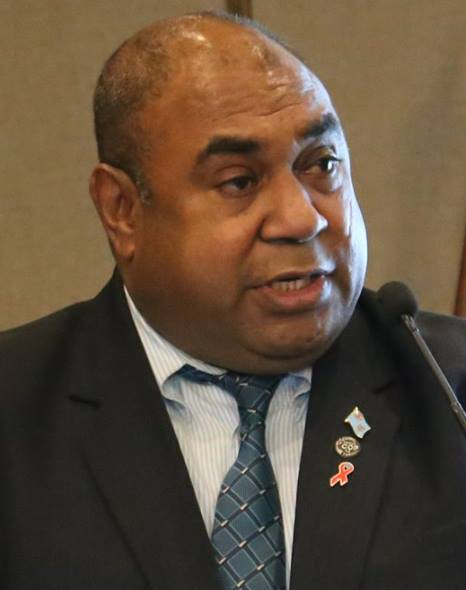
Cawaki in 2017

Joeli Ratulevu Cawaki is a Fijian politician and former Assistant Minister and Member of the Parliament of Fiji.

Cawaki is a former naval officer. From 2010 to 2014 he was Commissioner of the Western Division. He resigned in July 2014 in order to become a candidate for the FijiFirst Party.

Cawaki was elected to Parliament in the 2014 election, in which he won 3,394 votes. He was appointed Assistant Minister for Agriculture, Natural Disaster Management.

Cawaki was not selected by FijiFirst as a candidate for the 2018 election.
