= Samu Tawake =

Fijian rugby union player (born 1996)

- Full name: Samuela Ononono Fatafehi Tawake
- Born: 11 September 1996 (age 30) Levuka, Fiji
- Height: 183 cm (6 ft 0 in)
- Weight: 120 kg (265 lb; 18 st 13 lb)
- School: Marist Brothers High School, Holy Trinity Anglican School

Rugby union career
- Position: Prop
- Current team: Fijian Drua
Senior career
Years	Team	Apps	(Points)
2018	Canterbury	1	(0)
2019	Manawatu	10	(5)
2021	Rugby New York	16	(20)
2022–	Fijian Drua	9	(0)
- Correct as of 10 February 2022
International career
Years	Team	Apps	(Points)
2014	Fiji U20	3	(0)
2020	Fiji	1	(0)
- Correct as of 10 February 2022

Samuela Ononono Fatafehi Tawake (born 11 September 1996) is a Fijian rugby union player, currently playing for Fiji Drua of Super Rugby Competition. He also represents Fiji's national team. His preferred position is prop.

== Professional career ==
Tawake signed for Major League Rugby side Rugby United New York ahead of the 2021 Major League Rugby season. He had previously represented both Canterbury and Manawatu in the Mitre 10 Cup. Tawake made his debut for Fiji in the 2020 Autumn Nations Cup.
