= Holy Trinity Anglican School =

Co-educational school in Suva, Fiji

Location
- Suva, Rewa Province, Central Division, Fiji
- Coordinates: 18.1458°S 178.4316°E

Information
- Type: Co-educational
- Motto: Unity in Holy Trinity
- Religious affiliation(s): Anglican
- Established: 1970
- Founder: Holy Trinity Anglican Church Fiji
- Enrolment: 500+
- Colour(s): Navy Blue Aqua Blue

Holy Trinity Anglican School is an Anglican co-ed primary school situated in Suva, the capital of Fiji. The school was founded by the Holy Trinity Anglican Church sometime in the 1970s. The school motto is Unity in Holy Trinity.

== History ==
Holy Trinity Anglican School was established in the 1970s for European children. The school also catered to those of the Anglican denomination in Fiji.

As Fiji progressed over the years, the school became more accepting of other ethnicities, making it one of Fiji's most diverse primary schools. The school has achieved various academic success over the years as well as sporting excellence from rugby, netball, hockey, athletics, and swimming.

== Sports ==
Holy Trinity Anglican School has established an excellent sporting system in which the school has produced multiple sporting athletes. The school's physical education teacher is Mr. Babu, who has represented Fiji in bowling and has been a part of the school's system since the 1980s.

The school has excelled in Kaji rugby, producing rugby athletes such as Tevita Ikanivere and Samu Tawake.

Holy Trinity also participates in Netball and Hockey (Hornets) as well as Swimming; coming third nationally.

The school also holds its annual school interhouse to choose its representatives for the Chow Games. The respective school interhouse colours are as follows:

- Holland House
- Kempthorn House
- Twitchell House
- Vockler House

== Notable alumni ==
- Samu Tawake - player for the Fijian Drua and Fiji Rugby
- Tevita Ikanivere - captain for the Fijian Drua and player for the Fiji Rugby
- Patrick Osborne (rugby union) - player for the Highlanders and Fiji Rugby
- Neil Sharma - Fijian Politician
- Tevita Takayawa - Fijian judoka
- Tae Kami - founder of WOWs Kids Fiji
- Brittany Hazelman - Miss World Fiji 2015
