= Lorna Eden =

Fijian politician

Lorna Eden is a Fijian politician and former Assistant Minister and Member of the Parliament of Fiji.

Eden is a board member of the Fiji Hotel and Tourism Association and the owner of the Savusavu Hotsprings Hotel.

Eden was elected to Parliament in the 2014 election, receiving 1,869 votes. She was appointed Assistant Minister for Finance, Public Service, Public Enterprise and Trade and Tourism. She was not selected by FijiFirst as a candidate for the 2018 election.
