= Howard Politini Jnr =

Fijian politician

Howard Robin Thomas Politini Jnr (MP) is a Fijian politician and Member of the Parliament of Fiji. He is a member of the FijiFirst party.

In the 2014 election Politini received 550 votes, which was not enough to be make him a Member of Parliament for the FijiFirst party. He was subsequently appointed to the boards of the Bio-security Authority of Fiji and Tourism Fiji.

Politini was elected to Parliament in September 2016 following the resignation of former Defence Minister Timoci Natuva. Politini served as the Deputy Chair of the Standing Committee on Foreign Affairs and Defence during his term in parliament.
