= Fijian passport =

Passport of the Republic of Fiji

- Fijian passport front cover
- Type: Passport
- Issued by: Fiji
- Purpose: Identification
- Eligibility: Fijian citizenship
- Expiration: 10 years
- Cost: FJD 200.00

Fijian passports are issued to citizens of Fiji by the Passport Division of the Department of Immigration, under the ambits of the Fiji Islands Passports Act 2002.

== Types of passports ==
Fiji issues four types of passport:

- Ordinary Passport – Bright blue cover. Issued to ordinary citizens of Fiji. Valid for ten years.
- Diplomatic Passport – Scarlet red cover. Issued to the President and spouse, Prime Minister and spouse, government ministers and government officials working in diplomatic missions. Generally valid for ten years, but validity may be limited by term of appointment.
- Official Passport – Introduced in 2016. Issued to members of a Fijian disciplined force (Republic of Fiji Military Forces, Fiji Police Force or Fiji Corrections Service) travelling on peacekeeping duty.
- Certificate of identity (CI) – May be issued to facilitate emergency travel, and can be issued to non-citizens. Generally valid for a single trip only.

All passport applications lodged within Fiji or its diplomatic missions are referred to the Passport Division in Suva for assessment and issue. Certificates of identity may be issued by Fijian diplomatic missions for emergency travel only.

== Biometric passport ==
Fiji began issuing biometric passports (called ePassports) from 19 September 2019. The ePassport system was set up for Fiji's Department of Immigration by German company Muhlbauer ID Services. The new technology saw the passport fee more than double from FJD $76 to $200.

Fiji is the third country in the Pacific region to introduce biometric passports, after Tonga and the Solomon Islands.

== Visa requirements ==
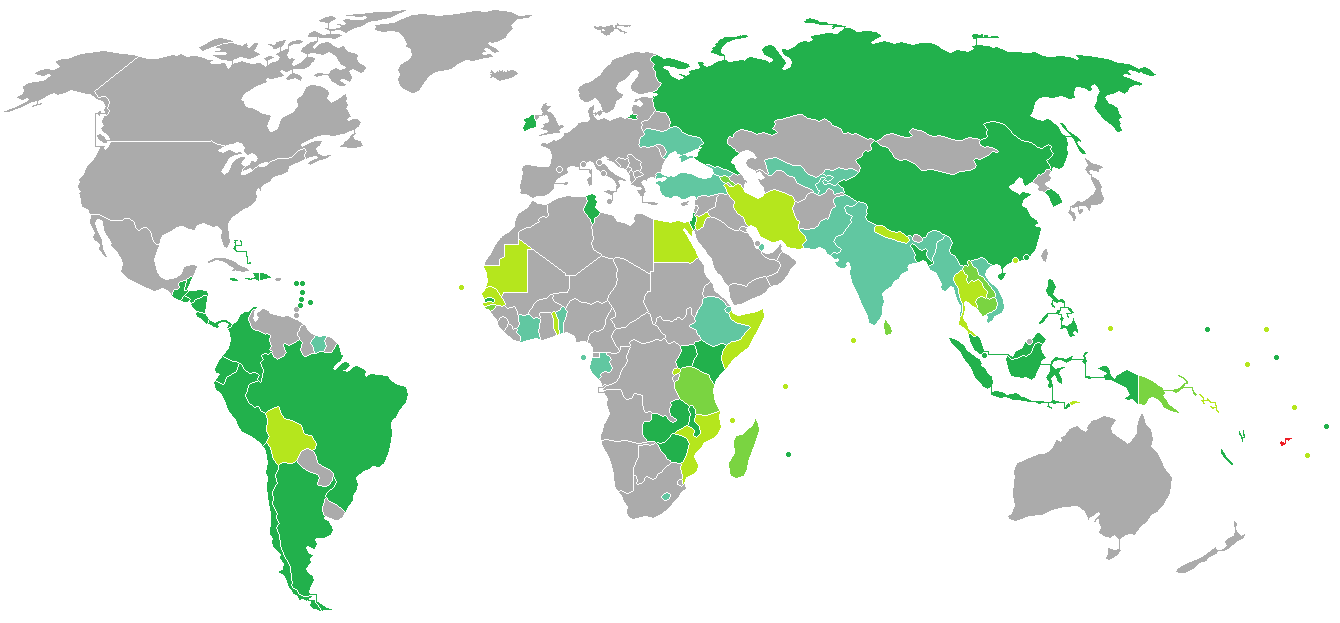
Visa requirements for Fijian citizens Fiji Visa free eVisa Visa issued upon arrival Visa required

As of 1 January 2017, Fijian citizens had visa-free or visa on arrival access to 79 countries and territories, ranking the Fijian passport 61st in terms of travel freedom according to the Henley visa restrictions index.
