= Visa policy of Fiji =

Policy on permits required to enter Fiji

Visitors to Fiji must obtain an Online Visa unless they are citizens from one of the visa-exempt countries.

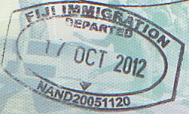
Fijian exit stamp

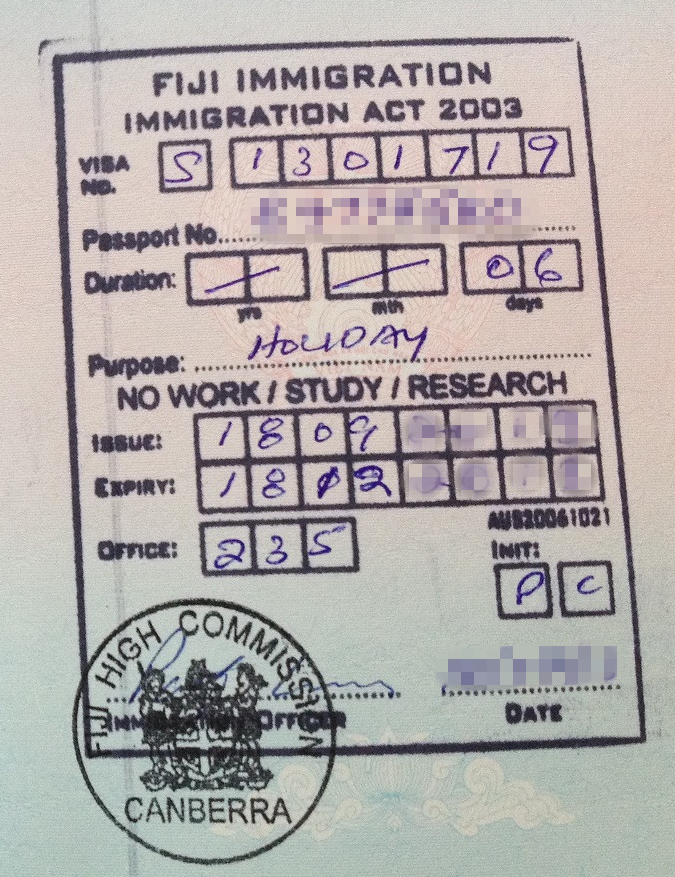
Fiji visa issued to a Vietnamese national in Australia

All visitors must have a passport valid for at least 6 months.

== Visa policy map ==
Visa policy of Fiji Fiji Visa not required (4 months) Online Visa

== Visa exemption ==
Citizens of the following countries and territories may enter Fiji without a visa for up to 4 months. Extension of stay is possible for 2 months, but no more than 6 months.

- All European Union member states

- Antigua and Barbuda
- Argentina
- Australia
- Bahamas
- Bangladesh
- Barbados
- Belize
- Botswana
- Brazil
- Brunei
- Canada
- Chile
- China
- Colombia
- Cuba
- Dominica
- Eswatini
- Gambia
- Georgia
- Ghana
- Grenada
- Guyana
- Hong Kong
- Iceland
- India
- Indonesia
- Israel
- Jamaica
- Japan
- Kenya
- Kiribati
- Lesotho
- Liechtenstein
- Macau
- Malawi
- Malaysia
- Maldives
- Marshall Islands
- Mauritius
- Mexico
- Micronesia
- Moldova
- Monaco
- Nauru
- New Zealand
- Nigeria
- Norway
- Palau
- Papua New Guinea
- Paraguay
- Peru
- Philippines
- Russia
- Saint Kitts and Nevis
- Saint Lucia
- Saint Vincent and the Grenadines
- Samoa
- Serbia
- Seychelles
- Singapore
- Solomon Islands
- South Africa
- South Korea
- Switzerland
- Taiwan
- Tanzania
- Thailand
- Tonga
- Trinidad and Tobago
- Tunisia
- Turkey
- Tuvalu
- Uganda
- Ukraine
- United Arab Emirates
- United Kingdom
- United States
- Uruguay
- Vanuatu
- Vatican City
- Venezuela
- Zambia
- Zimbabwe

== Online Visa ==
Citizens of other countries must obtain an Online Visa.

== Visa types ==
There are 2 types of visa: single-entry and multiple-entry. A single-entry visa is intended for one visit within 3 months. A multiple-entry visa is intended for multiple visits within 12 months. The documents required depend on the type of visit and must be submitted prior to travel.

== Visitor statistics ==
Most visitors arriving in Fiji were from the following countries of nationality:

Country	2022	2021	2020	2019	2018	2017	2016	2015
Australia	345,149	18,569	58,062	367,020	365,660	365,689	360,370	367,273
New Zealand	152,863	532	25,316	205,998	198,718	184,595	163,836	138,537
United States	69,897	4,233	17,198	96,968	86,075	81,198	69,628	67,831
China	5,756	2,178	9,319	47,027	49,271	48,796	49,083	40,174
United Kingdom	5,888	188	3,487	16,856	16,297	16,925	16,712	16,716
Canada	9,879	358	2,896	13,269	13,220	12,421	11,780	11,709
South Korea	709	51	548	6,806	8,176	8,871	8,071	6,700
Japan	854	233	2,252	14,868	11,903	6,350	6,274	6,092
Total	636,312	31,618	146,905	894,389	870,309	842,884	792,320	754,835

== See also ==
- Visa requirements for Fijian citizens
