= Inoke Kubuabola =

Fijian politician and Cabinet Minister

Ratu Inoke Kubuabola
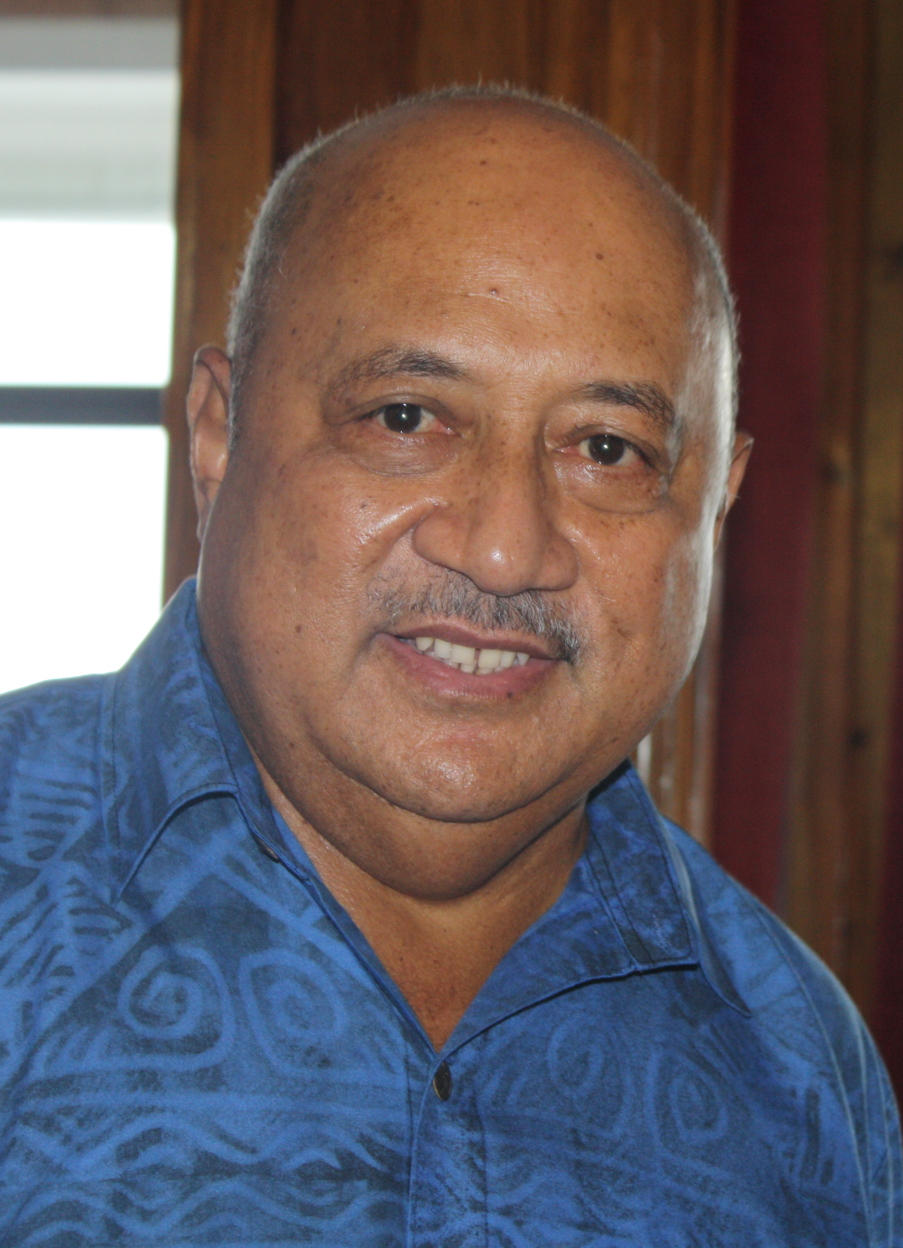
- Kubuabola in 2014

Leader of the Opposition
- In office 28 August 1999 – 3 October 2000
- Prime Minister: Mahendra Chaudhry; Ratu Tevita Momoedonu
- Preceded by: Jai Ram Reddy
- Succeeded by: Prem Singh

Minister of Foreign Affairs
- In office 24 July 2009 – 9 September 2016
- Prime Minister: Frank Bainimarama
- Preceded by: Frank Bainimarama
- Succeeded by: Frank Bainimarama

Minister for Immigration, National Security and Defence
- In office 9 September 2016 – 20 November 2018
- Prime Minister: Frank Bainimarama
- Preceded by: Frank Bainimarama (Acting)
- Succeeded by: Inia Seruiratu

Personal details
- Born: 1948 (age 77–78)
- Party: Soqosoqo ni Vakavulewa ni Taukei (1991–2006); FijiFirst (2014–present)

Ratu Inoke Kubuabola (born 1948) is a Fijian politician and Cabinet Minister. He is the former leader of the opposition and Minister for Foreign Affairs. Since 11 August 2022, he has been a High Commissioner to New Zealand.

Kubuabola worked as an assistant manager for the New Zealand Insurance Company in Auckland and Suva. From 1975 to 1987 he was secretary of the South Pacific Bible Society. A Fijian nationalist, he was involved in the planning of the 1987 Fijian coups d'état. Following the coup he was appointed Minister for Information in the Military Government, and subsequently served as Minister for Information, Broadcasting, Television and Telecommunication.

Kubuabola was elected to Parliament in the 1992 election as a candidate for the Soqosoqo ni Vakavulewa ni Taukei (SVT) and reappointed to Cabinet as Minister for Youth, Employment Opportunities and Sports. He was re-elected at the 1994 election and was appointed Minister for Regional Development and Multi Ethnic Affairs. In 1996 he was appointed Minister of Works, Infrastructure and Transport.

Following the defeat of the SVT government at the 1999 election and the subsequent resignation of its leader, the defeated Prime Minister Sitiveni Rabuka, Kubuabola became leader of the SVT and Leader of the Opposition. Under the 1997 Constitution of Fiji the Leader of the Opposition chose 8 of the 32 members of the Senate, and Kubuabola sparked controversy in the role by limiting his selection to members of opposition parties.

Following the Fiji coup of 2000 Kubuabola was appointed Minister for Information and Communications in the interim Cabinet formed by Laisenia Qarase. He held this office till September 2001, when he lost his seat in the 2001 election. That year he also resigned the Chairmanship of the Cakaudrove Provincial Council, which he had led for several years, to Sitiveni Rabuka.

== Diplomat ==
Kubuabola served as Fiji's High Commissioner to Papua New Guinea from 2002 to 2005. In late 2005, he attempted to handle the problem of Fijian security guards, whom some accused of being mercenaries, operating illegally on the island of Bougainville.

On 4 May 2006 Kubuabola was posted to Tokyo as Fiji's Ambassador to Japan and Korea, replacing Ratu Tevita Momoedonu. He remained in this position until July 2009 when he was named Minister for Foreign Affairs by the Interim Government.

Kubuabola ran as a candidate for FijiFirst in the 2014 election, and was elected with 5,414 votes. He did not seek re-election at the 2018 election.

On 11 August 2022, he presented his letter of credence to Governor-General Cindy Kiro as High Commissioner to New Zealand.

Political offices
Preceded by Ratu Tevita Vakalalabure	Chairman of the Cakaudrove Provincial Council; 1991–2001	Succeeded by Sitiveni Rabuka
Preceded by Jai Ram Reddy	Leader of the Opposition; 1999–2000	Succeeded by Prem Singh
Preceded by Frank Bainimarama	Minister for Foreign Affairs; 2009–2016	Succeeded by Frank Bainimarama
Diplomatic posts
Preceded by Sekove Naqiolevu	High Commissioner to Papua New Guinea; 2002–2005	Succeeded by Ratu Isoa Tikoca
Preceded by Ratu Tevita Momoedonu	Ambassador to Japan and South Korea; 2006–2009	Succeeded by Isikeli Mataitoga (Japan); Filimoni Kau (South Korea)
