= Justice of Appeal (Fiji) =

Justices of Appeal in Fiji are judges who sit on the Court of Appeal and on the Supreme Court, but not on the High Court. Justices of Appeal are appointed by the President on the nomination of the Judicial Service Commission, which is required to consult first with the appropriate Cabinet Minister and with the committee of the House of Representatives overseeing the administration of justice. A Justice of Appeal is required by the Constitution to be a qualified barrister or solicitor with a minimum of seven years' experience in Fiji or another country prescribed by law, or a past or present senior judicial officer in Fiji or another country prescribed by Parliament. The judiciary is the only branch of government from which non-citizens are not excluded. This is in recognition that as a developing country, the government may deem it in the national interest to look abroad for judges with expertise in various aspects of the law. Accordingly, judges from the United Kingdom, Australia and New Zealand, among other countries, have sometimes served on Fiji's courts, including as Justices of Appeal.

Justices of Appeal are required to retire on reaching the age of 70. The retirement age may be waived, however, for a term of not more than three years or for the duration of one or more sessions of the court concerned, to allow that person to continue in office, or to transfer to another judicial office, for a term of not more than three years. The waiver may be repeated, but not after the judge has reached the age of 75. No person, therefore, may serve as a Justice of Appeal after the age of 78.

Compulsory retirement does not prohibit retired judges from acting in that capacity on a temporary basis. Judges, including Justices of Appeal, who are past retirement age may therefore be called out of retirement, from time to time, to temporarily fill vacancies or to act in the place of one who is absent or otherwise unable to carry out his or her duties.

== See also ==
- Constitution of Fiji: Chapter 9 (detailing the composition and role of the judiciary)
