= Visa requirements for Fijian citizens =

Administrative entry restrictions

Visa requirements for Fijian citizens are administrative entry restrictions by the authorities of other states placed on citizens of Fiji. As of 2026, Fijian citizens had visa-free or visa on arrival access to 87 countries and territories, ranking the Fijian passport 51st in terms of travel freedom according to the Henley Passport Index.

== Visa requirements map ==
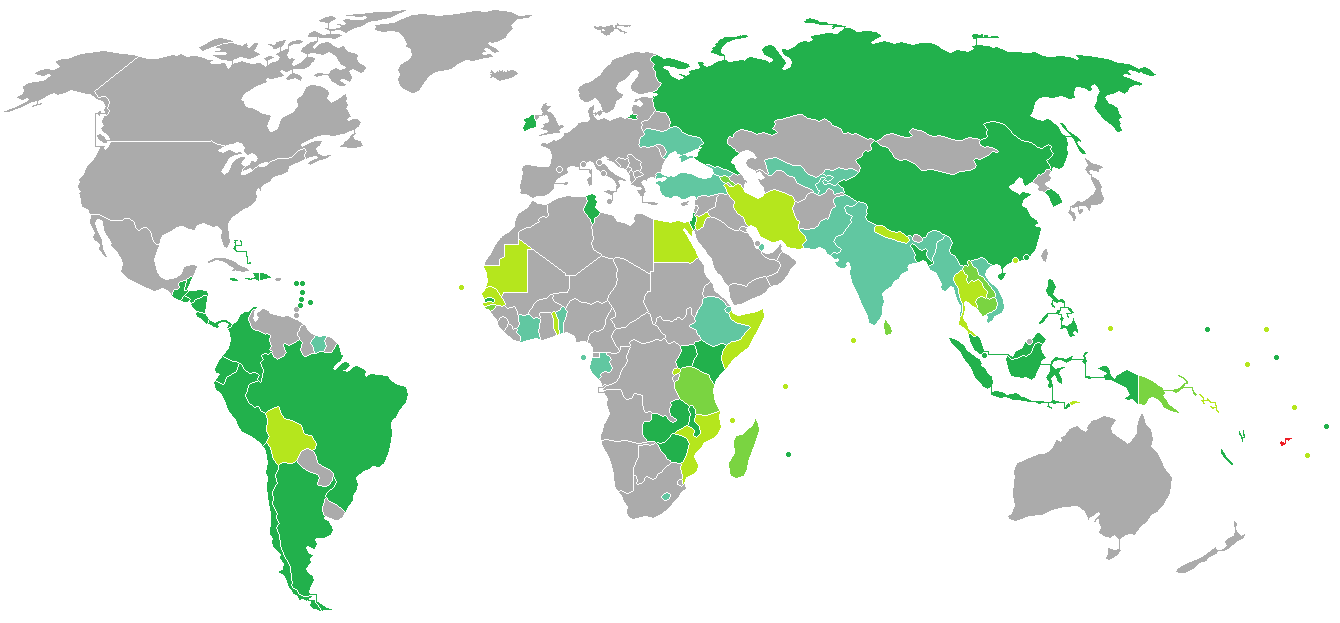
Visa requirements for Fijian citizens Fiji Visa free Visa issued upon arrival eVisa Visa available both on arrival or online Visa required

== Visa requirements ==
Country	Visa requirement	Allowed stay	Notes (excluding departure fees)
Afghanistan	eVisa	30 days	Visa is not required in case born in Afghanistan or can proof that one of their parents is a national of Afghanistan or born in Afghanistan.; e-Visa : Visitors must arrive at Kabul International (KBL).
Albania	eVisa		90 days visa free if hold a valid, multiple-entry and previously used visa or a residence permit issued by a Schengen area country, Cyprus, Ireland, the United Kingdom the United States
Algeria	Visa required		
Andorra	Visa de facto required		There are no visa requirements for entry into Andorra, but it can only be accessed by passing through France or Spain. A multiple entry visa is required to re-enter either France or Spain when leaving Andorra.
Angola	Visa not required	30 days	Maximum three entries per year
Antigua and Barbuda	Visa not required	1 month	
Argentina	Visa not required	90 days	
Armenia	eVisa / Visa on arrival	120 days	
Australia and territories	Visa required		May apply online (Online Visitor e600 visa).; Transit visa is not required
Austria	Visa required		
Azerbaijan	Visa required		
Bahamas	Visa not required	3 months	
Bahrain	Visa required	14 days	
Bangladesh	Visa not required	90 days	
Barbados	Visa not required	6 months	
Belarus	Visa required		Visa can be obtained on arrival at Minsk International Airport if the support documents were submitted no later than three business days before the expected date of arrival.
Belgium	Visa required		
Belize	Visa not required		
Benin	eVisa	30 days	Must have an international vaccination certificate.
Bhutan	eVisa		Visa fee is 40 USD per person and visa application may be processed within 5 business days with duration of stay of 90 days.; e-Visa applicant is also subject to pay Sustainable Development Fee
Bolivia	Visa on arrival	90 days	
Bosnia and Herzegovina	Visa required		30 days visa if hold a valid multiple entry visa or permanent residence of Ireland, Schengen Area member states, or the United States
Botswana	eVisa		
Brazil	Visa not required	90 days	90 days for tourism or 14 days for business; Extendable for up to 180 days for tourism or 90 days for business every 12 months.
Brunei	Visa required		
Bulgaria	Visa required		
Burkina Faso	eVisa		
Burundi	Visa on arrival		
Cambodia	eVisa / Visa on arrival		
Cameroon	eVisa		
Canada	Visa required		
Cape Verde	Visa on arrival		Visa on arrival at Sal, Boa Vista, São Vicente or Santiago international airports.; Requirement to register online 5 days before arrival; Also pay the airport security fee of CVE 3400 either online or on arrival.
Central African Republic	Visa required		
Chad	eVisa		
Chile	Visa not required	90 days	
China	Visa not required	30 days	
Colombia	Visa not required	90 days	
Comoros	Visa on arrival		
Republic of the Congo	Visa required		
Democratic Republic of the Congo	eVisa	7 days	
Costa Rica	Visa not required	30 days	
Côte d'Ivoire	eVisa		Visitors can apply online for an e-Visa that if approved can be picked up at the Port Bouet Airport in Abidjan.
Croatia	Visa required		
Cuba	eVisa		
Cyprus	Visa required		
Czech Republic	Visa required		
Denmark	Visa required		
Djibouti	eVisa	31 days	
Dominica	Visa not required	21 days	
Dominican Republic	Visa not required	30 days	Can be extended to 120 days
Ecuador	Visa not required	90 days	
Egypt	Visa on arrival	30 days	Conditions apply.
El Salvador	Visa not required	180 days	
Equatorial Guinea	eVisa		Must arrive via Malabo International Airport, processing fee 75 USD
Eritrea	Visa required		
Estonia	Visa required		
Eswatini	Visa required		
Ethiopia	eVisa	up to 90 days	eVisa holders must arrive via Addis Ababa Bole International Airport
Finland	Visa required		
France	Visa required		
Gabon	eVisa		Must arrive via Libreville International Airport in Libreville
Gambia	Visa not required	90 days	
Georgia	Visa not required	90 days	
Germany	Visa required		
Ghana	Visa required		
Greece	Visa required		
Grenada	Visa required		Beginning on December 1, 2020, all travelers to Grenada will be required to complete an online application to receive a Pure Safe Travel Authorization Certificate to enter Grenada.
Guatemala	Visa not required	90 days	
Guinea	eVisa	90 days	
Guinea-Bissau	eVisa / Visa on arrival	90 days	
Guyana	Visa required		
Haiti	Visa not required	90 days	
Honduras	Visa required		90 days visa free if hold a valid visa issued by Canada, the United States or a Schengen member state
Hungary	Visa required		
Iceland	Visa required		
India	eVisa	60 days	e-Visa holders must arrive via 32 designated airports (Note: Ahmedabad; Amritsar; Bagdogra; Bengaluru; Bhubaneswar; Chandigarh; Chennai; Coimbatore; Delhi; Gaya; Goa-Dabolim; Goa-Manohar; Guwahati; Hyderabad; Indore; Jaipur; Kannur; Kochi; Kolkata; Kozhikode; Lucknow; Madurai; Mangaluru; Mumbai; Nagpur; Port Blair; Pune; Surat; Thiruvananthapuram; Tiruchirappalli; Varanasi; Visakhapatnam) or 5 designated seaports. (Note: Chennai; Cochin; Mormugao (Goa); Mumbai; Mangalore); An Indian e-Tourist Visa may only be obtained twice within 1 calendar year.; Foreigners of Pakistani origin or who hold a Pakistani Passport are not eligible for an e-Visa. Foreigners who are not Pakistani nationals, but whose parents or grandparents (either paternal or maternal) were born in, or were permanent residents in Pakistan, are also not eligible for an e-Visa.
Indonesia	Visa required		
Iran	eVisa /Visa on arrival	30 days	
Iraq	eVisa		
Ireland	Visa not required	90 days	
Israel	ETA-IL	90 days	
Italy	Visa required		
Jamaica	Visa not required	180 days	
Japan	Visa required		Eligible for an e-Visa if residing in one these countries Australia, Brazil, Cambodia, Canada, India, Saudi Arabia, Singapore, South Africa, Taiwan, United Arab Emirates, United Kingdom, United States.; May apply online
Jordan	eVisa / Visa on arrival	30 days	Can be extended up to 60 days
Kazakhstan	eVisa		must arrive via Nursultan Nazarbayev International Airport or Almaty International Airport.
Kenya	Electronic Travel Authorisation	3 months	Applications can be submitted up to 90 days prior to travel and must be submitted at least 3 days in advance.; eTA fee is 32.50 USD.; Proof of reservation at the hotel where visitors plan to stay is required (if staying with friends, an invitation letter is also acceptable).; Yellow fever vaccination certificate is required if coming from endemic countries.
Kiribati	Visa not required	90 days	
North Korea	Visa required		
South Korea	Visa not required	30 days	
Kuwait	Visa required		e-Visa can be obtained for holders of a Residence Permit issued by a GCC member state under the following conditions: To be 18 years old and over.; The residence permit for a GCC state must be valid for at least another 3 months.; To be accompanied by the sponsor of the residence permit if the sponsor is an individual.; Does not apply to holders of a GCC Student Visa and Non-Skilled Worker Visa
Kyrgyzstan	eVisa	30 days or 60 days	
Laos	eVisa / Visa on arrival	30 days	18 (Note: Savannakhet Airport; Lanetoui - Mengkang (China); Meuangmom - Wan Pong (Myanmar); Banvang - Ban Khok Phai (Thailand); Namngeun - Huay Kon (Thailand); Paksan - Bueng Kan (Thailand); Paktaphan - Pak Saeng (Thailand); Pangmon - Ban Huak (Thailand); Phoudou (Thailand); Dak ta ock - Nam Giang (Vietnam); La Lai (Vietnam); Namkan (Vietnam); Namphao - Cau Treo (Vietnam); Namsoy - Na Meo (Vietnam); Naphao - Cha Lo (Vietnam); Pahang - Long Sap (Vietnam); Panghok - Tây Trang (Vietnam); Phoukeua - Bo Y (Vietnam)) of the 33 border crossings are only open to regular visa holders.; e-Visa may be used to enter Laos through the Luang Prabang, Pakse and Vientiane international airports, 3 Thai-Lao Friendship Bridges (Note: Vientiane (Friendship Bridge 1); Savannakhet (Friendship Bridge 2); Bokeo (Friendship Bridge 4)), in Boten (road and railroad), and in Vientiane (at Khamsavath railway station).; Visa on arrival is available at the Luang Prabang, Pakse and Vientiane international airports, 4 Thai-Lao Friendship Bridges (Note: Vientiane (Friendship Bridge 1); Savannakhet (Friendship Bridge 2); Khammouane (Friendship Bridge 3); Bokeo (Friendship Bridge 4)) and 7 border crossings. (Note: Nongnokkheane - Trapeang Kriel (Cambodia); Boten - Bo han (China); Golden Triangle/Samliemkham (Thailand); Khamsavath railway station (Thailand); Namheuang - Ban Na Kraseng (Thailand); Vang tao - Chongmek (Thailand); Dansavan - Lao Bảo (Vietnam))
Latvia	Visa required		
Lebanon	Visa required		In addition to a visa, approval should be obtained from the Immigration department of the General Directorate of General Security (La Surete Generale).
Lesotho	eVisa	44 days	
Liberia	eVisa		
Libya	eVisa		
Liechtenstein	Visa required		
Lithuania	Visa required		
Luxembourg	Visa required		
Madagascar	eVisa / Visa on arrival	90 days	
Malawi	Visa not required	90 days	
Malaysia	Visa not required	30 days	
Maldives	Visa on arrival	30 days	
Mali	Visa required		
Malta	Visa required		
Marshall Islands	Visa on arrival	90 days	
Mauritania	eVisa		
Mauritius	Visa not required	180 days	180 days per calendar years for tourism, 120 days per calendar years for business
Mexico	Visa required		Visa free if hold both a valid visa or permanent residence issued by Canada, Japan, Schengen Area, the United Kingdom, the United States or only permanent residence issued by Chile or Colombia
Micronesia	Visa not required	30 days	
Moldova	eVisa		90 days visa free if hold a valid residence permit, a valid 'C'-type, or a valid 'D'-type visa issued by a Schengen member state or a European Union member state
Monaco	Visa required		
Mongolia	eVisa		
Montenegro	Visa required		30 days visa free if Hola valid visa issued by Schengen Area, Australia, Japan, Canada, New Zealand, Ireland, the United States or the United Kingdom
Morocco	Visa required		May apply for an e-Visa if holding a valid visa or a residency document issued by one of the following countries: Schengen Area, Australia, Canada, Ireland, New Zealand, United Kingdom, United States a residency document issued by Cyprus, Japan, United Arab Emirates.
Mozambique	eVisa / Visa on arrival	30 days	
Myanmar	eVisa	28 days	eVisa holders must arrive via Yangon, Nay Pyi Taw or Mandalay airports or via land border crossings with Thailand — Tachileik, Myawaddy and Kawthaung or India — Rih Khaw Dar and Tamu.; eVisa is available for tourism only.
Namibia	eVisa		
Nauru	Visa on arrival	90 days	
Nepal	eVisa / Visa on arrival	150 days	
Netherlands	Visa required		
New Zealand	Visa required		International Visitor Conservation and Tourism Levy not required.; May transit without visa if transit is through Auckland Airport and for no longer than 24 hours, subject to meeting character requirements and obtaining an Electronic Travel Authority prior to departure.; Holders of an Australian Permanent Resident Visa or Resident Return Visa may be granted a New Zealand Resident Visa on arrival permitting indefinite stay (according to the Trans-Tasman Travel Arrangement), subject to meeting character requirements and obtaining an Electronic Travel Authority before departure.
Nicaragua	Visa not required	90 days	
Niger	Visa required		
Nigeria	eVisa		
North Macedonia	Visa required		15 days visa free if Hold a valid Type "C" multiple-entry visa for the Schengen Area or a temporary/permanent residence permit of an EU Member State or a country signatory of the Schengen Agreement
Norway	Visa required		
Oman	Visa required		
Pakistan	eVisa		
Palau	Visa on arrival	30 days	Can be extended twi for a fee
Panama	Visa not required	90 days	
Papua New Guinea	Easy Visitor Permit	60 days	
Paraguay	Visa required		
Peru	Visa not required	180 days	
Philippines	Visa not required	30 days	
Poland	Visa required		
Portugal	Visa required		
Qatar	eVisa		
Romania	Visa required		
Russia	Visa not required	90 days	90 days within one calendar year period
Rwanda	Visa not required	30 days	
Saint Kitts and Nevis	Electronic Travel Authorisation	3 months	
Saint Lucia	Visa not required	6 weeks	
Saint Vincent and the Grenadines	Visa not required	3 months	
Samoa	Entry Permit on arrival	60 days	
San Marino	Visa de facto required		There are no visa requirements for entry into San Marino, but it can only be accessed by passing through Italy. A multiple entry Schengen visa is required to re-enter Italy when leaving San Marino.
São Tomé and Príncipe	eVisa		
Saudi Arabia	Visa required		Tourist visa on arrival for holders of a valid multiple entry visa from US, UK or Schengen area, under the condition that the multiple entry visa has been used at least once, proving that by showing the entry and exit stamps of the country of issuance.
Senegal	Visa on arrival	30 days	
Serbia	Visa required		90 days visa free if holders of valid visa or residents of the Cyprus, Ireland, Schengen Area member states, United Kingdom or the United States
Seychelles	Visitor's Permit on arrival	3 months	
Sierra Leone	eVisa / Visa on arrival	1 month	
Singapore	Visa not required	30 days	
Slovakia	Visa required		
Slovenia	Visa required		
Solomon Islands	Visa on arrival	3 months	3 months per calendar year
Somalia	eVisa	30 days	
South Africa	ETA		
South Sudan	eVisa		Obtainable online; Printed visa authorization must be presented at the time of travel
Spain	Visa required		
Sri Lanka	ETA / Visa on arrival	30 days	The standard visitor visa allows a stay of 60 days within any 6-month period.; Visa fees (for Standard visitor visa): SAARC - USD 35; Non SAARC - USD 75; e-Visa categories will be charged an additional USD 18.50 service fee.; If transiting from any of the Sri Lankan airports, An e-Visa is exempted (2 day transit period).
Sudan	Visa required		
Suriname	Visa not required	90 days	
Sweden	Visa required		
Switzerland	Visa required		
Syria	eVisa		
Tajikistan	eVisa	60 days	
Tanzania	eVisa / Visa on arrival	3 months	
Thailand	Visa not required	60 days	
Timor-Leste	Visa on arrival	30 days	
Togo	eVisa	15 days	
Tonga	Visa on arrival	31 days	
Trinidad and Tobago	Visa required		
Tunisia	Visa not required	90 days	
Turkey	eVisa	90 days	
Turkmenistan	eVisa		Passengers with a letter of invitation issued by a company registered in Turkmenistan and approved by the Ministry of Foreign Affairs can be obtained on arrival for a maximum of 10 days.
Tuvalu	Visa on arrival	1 month	
Uganda	Visa not required	3 months	
Ukraine	eVisa		
United Arab Emirates	Visa not required	90 days	
United Kingdom and Crown dependencies	Visa required		
United States	Visa required		
Uruguay	Visa required		
Uzbekistan	eVisa	30 days	5-day visa-free transit at the international airports if holding a confirmed onward ticket for a flight to a third country.
Vanuatu	Visa not required	120 days	
Vatican City	Visa required		There are no visa requirements for entry into Vatican, but it can only be accessed by passing through Italy. A multiple entry Schengen visa is required to re-enter Italy when leaving Vatican.
Venezuela	eVisa		Introduction of Electronic Visa System for Tourist and Business Travelers.
Vietnam	eVisa	90 days	30 days free when visit Phu Quoc Island
Yemen	Visa required		
Zambia	Visa not required	90 days	
Zimbabwe	Visa not required	3 months	

== Dependent, Disputed, or Restricted territories ==
Unrecognized or partially recognized countries

Territory	Visa requirement	Allowed stay	Notes
Abkhazia	Visa required		
Kosovo	Visa not required	90 days	
Northern Cyprus	Visa not required		
Palestine	Visa not required		Arrival by sea to Gaza Strip not allowed.
Sahrawi Arab Democratic Republic			Undefined visa regime in the Western Sahara controlled territory.
Somaliland	Visa on arrival	30 days	30 US dollars, payable on arrival.
South Ossetia	Visa not required		Multiple entry visa to Russia and three day prior notification are required to enter South Ossetia.
Taiwan	Visa required		
Transnistria	Visa not required		Registration required after 24h.

Dependent and autonomous territories

Territory	Visa requirement	Allowed stay	Notes
China
Hong Kong	Visa not required	90 days	
Macau	Visa on arrival	30 days	
Denmark
Faroe Islands	Visa required		
Greenland	Visa required		
France
French Guiana	Visa required		
French Polynesia	Visa not required	90 days	
(France) French West Indies	Visa required		Includes overseas departments of Guadeloupe and Martinique and overseas collectivities of Saint Barthélemy and Saint Martin.
Mayotte	Visa required		
New Caledonia	Visa not required	90 days	
Réunion	Visa required		
Saint Pierre and Miquelon	Visa required		
Wallis and Futuna	Visa not required	90 days	
Netherlands
Aruba	Visa required		
Caribbean Netherlands	Visa required		Includes Bonaire, Sint Eustatius and Saba.
Curaçao	Visa required		
Sint Maarten	Visa required		
New Zealand
Cook Islands	Visa not required	31 days	
Niue	Visa not required	30 days	
Tokelau	Visa required		
United Kingdom
Akrotiri and Dhekelia	Visa required		
Anguilla	eVisa		Holders of a valid visa issued by Canada, the United States or the United Kingdom do not require a visa.
Bermuda	Visa not required		
British Indian Ocean Territory	Special permit required		Special permit required.
British Virgin Islands	Visa not required	1 month	
Cayman Islands	Visa not required	6 months	
Falkland Islands	Visa required		
Gibraltar	Visa required		
Montserrat	Visa not required	6 months	
Pitcairn Islands	Visa not required	14 days	landing fee 35 USD or tax of 5 USD if not going ashore.
Ascension Island	eVisa	3 months	within any year
Saint Helena	eVisa		
Tristan da Cunha	Permission required		Permission to land required for 15/30 pounds sterling (yacht/ship passenger) for Tristan da Cunha Island or 20 pounds sterling for Gough Island, Inaccessible Island or Nightingale Islands.
South Georgia and the South Sandwich Islands	Permit required		Pre-arrival permit from the Commissioner required (72 hours/1 month for 110/160 pounds sterling).
Turks and Caicos Islands	Visa not required	90 days	
United States
American Samoa	Visa required		
Guam	Visa required		
Northern Mariana Islands	Visa required		
Puerto Rico	Visa required		
U.S. Virgin Islands	Visa required		
Antarctica and adjacent islands
Special permits required for Bouvet Island, British Antarctic Territory, French Southern and Antarctic Lands, Argentine Antarctica, (Australia) Australian Antarctic Territory, (Antártica Chilena Province) Chilean Antarctic Territory, (Australia) Heard Island and McDonald Islands, (Norway) Peter I Island, (Norway) Queen Maud Land, (New Zealand) Ross Dependency.

== See also ==
- Visa policy of Fiji
- Fijian passport
- Foreign relations of Fiji
