= Patrick Osborne (rugby union) =

Fijian rugby union footballer (born 1987)

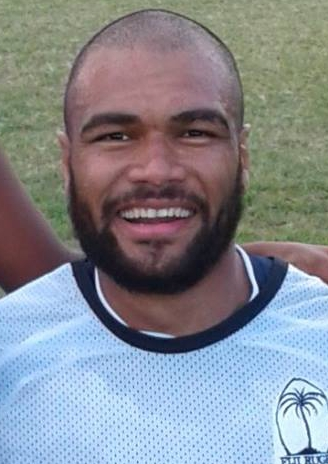
- Osborne in 2016
- Born: Patrick Osborne; 14 June 1987 (age 39) Suva, Fiji
- Height: 1.86 m (6 ft 1 in)
- Weight: 108 kg (17 st 0 lb; 238 lb)
- University: University of the South Pacific

Rugby union career
- Position: Wing
Senior career
Years	Team	Apps	(Points)
2016–	Kubota Spears	5	(25)
- Correct as of 15 January 2017
Provincial / State sides
Years	Team	Apps	(Points)
2010–2015	Canterbury	42	(70)
- Correct as of 26 October 2015
Super Rugby
Years	Team	Apps	(Points)
2012	Crusaders	0	(0)
2013	Chiefs	9	(15)
2014–2017	Highlanders	51	(80)
- Correct as of 31 July 2016
International career
Years	Team	Apps	(Points)
2016	Fiji	6	(5)
- Correct as of 17 July 2017

Patrick Osborne (born 14 June 1987) is a Fijian rugby union footballer. He plays as a winger for Kubota Spears in the Japanese Top League. He attended Holy Trinity Anglican School before spending his secondary school education at Jai Narayan College and Queen Victoria School.

== Playing career ==
Osborne made his ITM Cup debut for Canterbury against Hawke's Bay in 2010, and became a regular starter for the province the following year. His strong performances earned him a contract with the Crusaders squad for the 2012 Super Rugby season, but he didn't make any appearances in the competition. After being hobbled by a broken collarbone during the 2012 ITM Cup, he signed with the Chiefs for the 2013 Super Rugby season. He finished the Chiefs' title-winning season with two tries from 9 appearances, including 4 starts.

Looking for more playing time, Osborne signed with the Highlanders for two seasons. Osborne was regular started in the 2014 season but with some injuries he was out for a few weeks. Osborne scored his first try for the Highlanders against the Blues on his debut for the team.

He has made the All Blacks training side twice in 2014 and 2015 but was never selected. In May 2016, he dashed his All Blacks dream and made himself available for the Fiji. He also signed on to play for Kubota Spears in the Japanese Top League but would return to play for the Highlanders.

In June 2016, he was included in the Fiji team for the June tests against Tonga and Samoa in the 2016 World Rugby Pacific Nations Cup as well as the one-off test against Georgia.
