= Mahendra Reddy =

Fijian politician

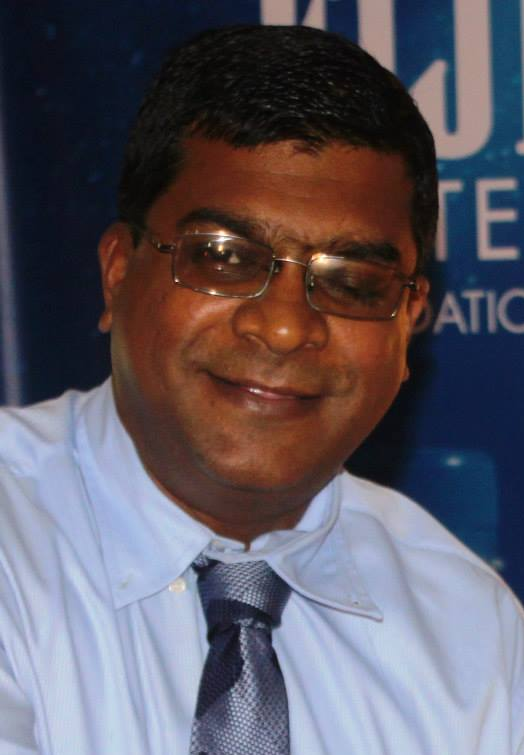
- Reddy in 2015

Minister for Agriculture, Waterways and Environment
- Incumbent
- Assumed office 11 December 2017
- Appointed by: Frank Bainimarama
- Succeeded by: Vatimi Rayalu

Minister for Education, Heritage and Arts
- In office 25 September 2014 – 5 July 2017
- Prime Minister: Frank Bainimarama
- Preceded by: Filipe Bole
- Succeeded by: Aiyaz Sayed-Khaiyum

Member of the Fijian Parliament for Fiji First List
- In office 17 September 2014 – 26 January 2023

Personal details
- Born: Nadi, Fiji
- Party: Fiji First Party
- Spouse: Bhunweshwari Reddy
- Children: Shivani Reddy Vishnava Reddy

Mahendra Reddy is a Fijian politician and former Member of the Parliament of Fiji. He served as the Minister for Agriculture, Waterways and Environment from 2017 to 2022.

In March 2009, he was appointed as the Chair of the Commerce Commission. In July 2014, he resigned as Commerce Commission director and from the Reserve Bank of Fiji board chairman to join the FijiFirst party to contest in the elections.

Reddy was elected to Parliament in the 2014 election, in which he won 5,398 votes. He was appointed to Cabinet as Minister for Education, National Heritage, Culture and Arts in September 2014.

On 4 July 2017 Reddy appeared in court on charges of bribery and using undue influence over allegations he offered a water supply to a school in exchange for the school manager's vote. Due to this, he resigned from his post. However, in December 2017, due to no conclusive evidence, those charges were dropped, and Reddy was appointed as the new minister for Ministry of Waterways.

He was re-elected in the 2022 election with 2654 votes. On 26 January 2023 Reddy resigned from Parliament. He was replaced as an MP by Penioni Ravunawa.
