= Sakiasi Ditoka =

The Honourable Sakiasi Ditoka MP
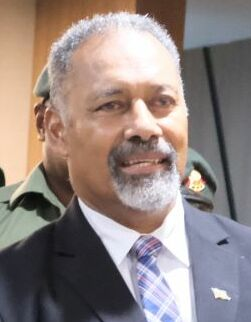
- Ditoka in 2023

Minister for Rural, Maritime Development and Disaster Management
- Incumbent
- Assumed office 24 December 2022
- Prime Minister: Sitiveni Rabuka
- Preceded by: Inia Seruiratu

Member of the Fijian Parliament for PA List
- Incumbent
- Assumed office 14 December 2022

Personal details
- Party: People's Alliance

Military service
- Allegiance: Republic of Fiji
- Branch/service: Republic of Fiji Military Forces
- Rank: Major

Sakiasi Raisevu Ditoka is a Fijian politician and cabinet minister who has served as the Minister for Rural, Maritime Development and Disaster Management since 24 December 2022. He is also a member of the People's Alliance serving as its general secretary.

== Early life ==
A former military officer, Ditoka joined the Republic of Fiji Military Forces and rose to the rank of major. He left the military in 2002 and joined the Public Service Commission. Ditoka was then appointed as private secretary to then Prime Minister Laisenia Qarase until his removal in a 2006 military coup.

== Political career ==
Ditoka was one of the founding members of the People's Alliance led by Prime Minister Sitiveni Rabuka. The party was registered and subsequently launched in 2021 with him as general secretary. Ditoka contested the 2022 Fijian general election and campaigned for more development as well as raising concerns about issues regarding health and education. On 17 December he and Rabuka were interrogated by police over comments calling for military intervention to protect the electoral process.

He was elected to the Parliament of Fiji with 1833 votes. On 24 December 2022, he was appointed as Minister for Rural and Maritime Development and Disaster Management.
