= Court of Appeal of Fiji =

Court of the judiciary of Fiji

The Court of Appeal of Fiji is one of three courts that were established by Chapter 9 of the 1997 Constitution, the others being the High Court and the Supreme Court. The Court of Appeal was a new institution established when the 1997 Constitution came into effect; the other two courts predated it. The Constitution authorizes the Court of Appeal "to hear and determine appeals" from all High Court judgements. Occasionally, other powers may be assigned to this court by law.

The President of the Court of Appeal chairs the Court of Appeal. The Chief Justice is not permitted to hold this position; the Court of Appeal is the only court from which the Chief Justice is constitutionally barred from membership. This is to give the Court of Appeal a measure of independence from the other courts. Also members of the Court of Appeal are the puisne judges, at least ten in number (who also sit on the High Court), and persons specifically appointed as Justice of Appeal.

Section 129 of the Constitution declares that "A judge who has sat in a trial of a matter that is the subject of appeal to a higher court must not sit in the appeal." As the membership of the High Court overlaps to a large extent with that of the Appeal Court and the Supreme Court, this clause is inserted to prevent a conflict of interest.

These constitutional arrangements were temporarily upset by the Fiji coup of 2000. On the advice of then-Chief Justice Sir Timoci Tuivaga, the Interim Military Government of Commodore Frank Bainimarama promulgated three decrees suspending the Constitution and reforming the judiciary. The Supreme Court was abolished, and the Chief Justice was made President of the Appeal Court. Following a High Court order on 15 November 2000 to restore the Constitution, upheld by the Court of Appeal on 2 March 2001, the former judicial order was restored.

Gordon Ward was appointed as the President of the Appeal Court, which position he held until 2007. In 2007, following the military coup of 5 December 2006, six Australian and New Zealand judges resigned from the court. They were replaced by two Malaysian judges, "with more appointments from Asia expected to follow soon".

A Court of Appeals ruling in April 2009, which found that the 2006 coup had been illegal, triggered the 2009 Fijian constitutional crisis. Following the ruling by three Court of Appeals judges, all of whom were from Sydney, Australia, the President of Fiji suspended the country's constitution and removed all judges from office. Two of the three judges were on a plane bound for Australia at the time of the President's actions. A new panel of three judges was subsequently appointed.

== See also ==
- Constitution of Fiji: Chapter 9 (detailing the composition and role of the judiciary)
