= Supreme Court of Fiji =

Apex court of Fiji

The Supreme Court of Fiji is one of three courts originally established in Chapter 9 of the 1997 Constitution of Fiji, the others being the High Court and the Court of Appeal. In the current Constitution of Fiji, the Supreme Court is declared to be "the final appellate court" – in other words, there is no judicial authority higher than the Supreme Court within Fiji. In this respect, the Supreme Court takes over the appellate functions formerly performed by the United Kingdom's Judicial Committee of the Privy Council before Fiji became a republic in 1987.

The Constitution gives the Supreme Court exclusive jurisdiction to hear and determine appeals from all final judgements of the Court of Appeal. Cases could not be brought before the Supreme Court by individuals; only the Court of Appeal could decide to refer a case to it, or the Supreme Court could, in its own judgement, decide to hear an appeal. This court has the power to review, vary, affirm, or set aside decisions or orders of the Court of Appeal, may order retrials, and may award costs to defendants and plaintiffs. Decisions of the Supreme Court are binding on all subordinate courts of the state. At its own discretion, the Supreme Court may review any judgement, pronouncement or order that it has previously rendered. Under 98(3c) of the Constitution, the Supreme Court has original jurisdiction to hear and determine constitutional questions referred to it by the cabinet, in accordance with Sections 91(5).

The Supreme Court consists of the Chief Justice, who is also the President of the Supreme Court, all Justices of Appeal (who are also members of the Court of Appeal), and others specifically appointed as Supreme Court judges. The puisne judges, who sit on the High Court and the Court of Appeal, are not members of the Supreme Court. Section 129 of the Constitution declares that "A judge who has sat in a trial of a matter that is the subject of appeal to a higher court must not sit in the appeal." As the membership of the Supreme Court overlaps to a large extent with that of the Appeal Court and the High Court, this clause is inserted to prevent a conflict of interest. In all proceedings before the Supreme Court, questions are determined according to the opinion of the majority.

== See also ==
- Constitution of Fiji: Chapter 9 (for the original document that established the role of the judiciary)

== Citations ==
- https://judiciary.gov.fj/courts/supreme-court/#judges
