= Frank Bainimarama =

Prime Minister of Fiji from 2007 to 2022

Rear Admiral the Honourable Frank Bainimarama CF (MIL), OStJ, MSD
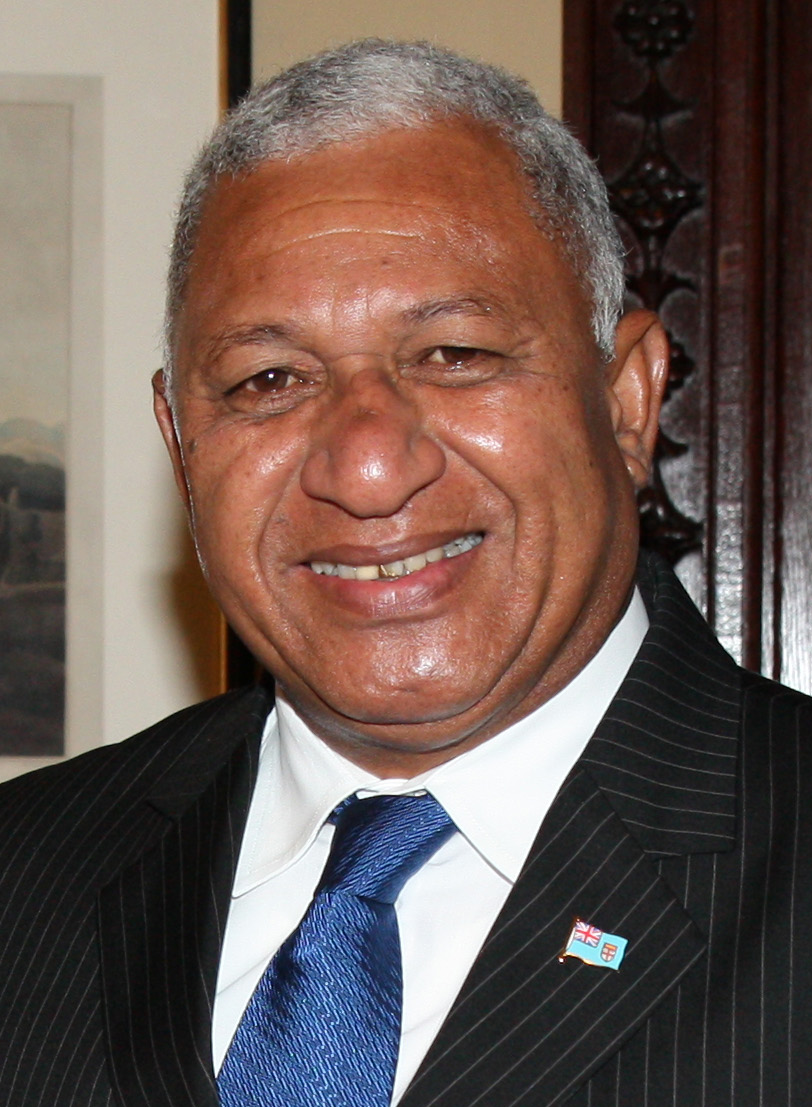
- Bainimarama in 2014

Prime Minister of Fiji
- In office 22 September 2014 – 24 December 2022; Acting: 5 January 2007 – 22 September 2014
- President: Josefa Iloilo; Epeli Nailatikau; Jioji Konrote; Wiliame Katonivere
- Preceded by: Jona Senilagakali (2007; acting)
- Succeeded by: Sitiveni Rabuka

Leader of the Opposition
- In office 24 December 2022 – 8 March 2023
- Prime Minister: Sitiveni Rabuka
- Preceded by: Naiqama Lalabalavu
- Succeeded by: Inia Seruiratu
Ministerial offices
Minister for iTaukei Affairs
In office January 2008 – 24 December 2022
Preceded by	Ratu Epeli Ganilau
Succeeded by	Sitiveni Rabuka
Minister for Foreign Affairs
In office 16 April 2020 – 24 December 2022
Preceded by	Inia Seruiratu
Succeeded by	Sitiveni Rabuka
In office September 2016 – January 2019
Preceded by	Ratu Inoke Kubuabola
Succeeded by	Inia Seruiratu
Minister for Finance, Strategic Planning, National Development and Statistics
In office 18 August 2008 – 24 September 2014
Preceded by	Mahendra Chaudhry
Succeeded by	Aiyaz Sayed-Khaiyum
Minister for Defence, National Security and Immigration
In office 5 January 2007 – 4 January 2008
Preceded by	Pio Wong
Succeeded by	Ratu Epeli Ganilau
Minister for Disaster Management
In office 21 April 2020 – 24 December 2022
President	Jioji Konrote
Preceded by	Jone Usamate
Succeeded by	Sakiasi Ditoka
Minister for Sugar Industry
In office January 2008 – 24 December 2022
Preceded by	Mahendra Chaudhry
Succeeded by	Charan Jeath Singh
Minister for Information, Public Service, and People's Charter for Change
In office January 2007 – 24 September 2014
Preceded by	Positemi Matalomani
Succeeded by	Aiyaz Sayed-Khaiyum

Leader of FijiFirst
- In office 31 March 2014 – 7 June 2024

President of Fiji
- Acting
- In office 5 December 2006 – 4 January 2007
- Prime Minister: Jona Senilagakali
- Preceded by: Josefa Iloilo
- Succeeded by: Josefa Iloilo
- In office 29 May 2000 – 13 July 2000
- Prime Minister: Laisenia Qarase
- Preceded by: Kamisese Mara
- Succeeded by: Josefa Iloilo

Personal details
- Born: Josaia Voreqe Bainimarama; 27 April 1954 (age 72) Kiuva, Colony of Fiji
- Party: FijiFirst (2014–2024)
- Spouse: Maria Makitalena
- Children: 5
- Relatives: Meli Bainimarama (brother)
- Education: Dalhousie University

Military service
- Allegiance: Dominion of Fiji (until 1987); Fiji (since 1987)
- Branch/service: Republic of Fiji Navy
- Years of service: 1975–2014
- Rank: Rear admiral
- Criminal information
- Status: Released
- Conviction: One count of attempting to pervert the course of justice
- Penalty: 1 year in prison (released after 8 months)

Details
- Imprisoned at: Korovou Corrections Centre

Josaia Voreqe "Frank" Bainimarama CF (MIL) OStJ MSD (Fijian pronunciation: [tʃoˈsɛia βoˈreŋɡe mbɛiniˈmarama]; born 27 April 1954) is a Fijian former politician and naval officer who served as the prime minister of Fiji from 2007 until 2022. A member of the FijiFirst party, which he founded in 2014, he began his career as an officer in the Fijian navy and commander of the Fijian military. Despite being suspended from Parliament, he served as the opposition leader from 24 December 2022 until 8 March 2023, when he resigned and was replaced by Inia Seruiratu.

Bainimarama attended Marist Brothers High School, the Asian Institute of Technology and Dalhousie University. He joined the Fijian Navy in 1975 and rose through the ranks, becoming an able seaman and a midshipman in 1976, an ensign in 1977, and later promoted to a sub-lieutenant at the end of that year. He was promoted to lieutenant-commander in 1986 and became a commander in 1988. He later became captain in 1991. In 1997, he was appointed Chief of Staff of the Republic of Fiji Military Forces.

In 1998, he was promoted to a commodore and later became the commander of the Armed Forces in 1999. In 2000, during a coup attempt, he convinced the President of Fiji Kamisese Mara to resign and formed an interim military government, which negotiated with the coup leaders. The military government was replaced by a civilian one by the end of the year. He relinquished command of the military in 2014, and in recognition of his military service, he was promoted to rear admiral.

Bainimarama instigated the 2006 coup, removing Prime Minister Laisenia Qarase from power. He later restored Ratu Josefa Iloilo as president and himself as prime minister in 2007. Bainimarama promised the return of elections and democracy in 2014 and formed a party named FijiFirst. In the 2014 Fijian general election, FijiFirst won a majority, and Bainimarama was sworn in as prime minister of Fiji by President Epeli Nailatikau. In the 2018 Fijian general election, FijiFirst won an outright majority, and Bainimarama became prime minister for a second term on 20 November 2018. In the 2022 Fijian general election, FijiFirst won a plurality but was unable to form a government, meaning Bainimarama ceased to be prime minister after 16 years of rule, making him the second-longest-serving prime minister of Fiji after Kamisese Mara. He was succeeded by the leader of the 1987 Fijian coups d'état, Sitiveni Rabuka.

Bainimarama resigned from Parliament and as the leader of the opposition in March 2023. The next day, he was charged with abuse of office over allegations he and police commissioner Sitiveni Qiliho interfered with an investigation into financial mismanagement at the University of the South Pacific. On 14 March 2024, the High Court of Fiji convicted him of attempting to pervert the course of justice. On 9 May 2024, he was sentenced to one year in prison.

== Early life ==
Bainimarama was born in the village of Kiuva in the Kaba Peninsula, Tailevu Province. He is the brother of Ratu Meli Bainimarama and Ratu Timoci Bainimarama, both senior civil servants. He was Roman Catholic-educated and graduated from Marist Brothers High School in Suva.

== Military career ==
Bainimarama's naval career spans three decades. He has received a number of honours for his service. He has been made an Officer Brother in the Order of St John of Jerusalem, and has received the Meritorious Service Decoration, the Peacekeeping Medal for United Nations peacekeepers, the General Service Medal, the Fiji Republic Medal, and the 25 Anniversary Medal.

=== Naval career ===
Following his education at Marist Brothers High School, Bainimarama enlisted with the Fijian Navy on 26 July 1975 and rose smoothly through the ranks, becoming an able seaman in August 1976, a midshipman in December the same year, and an ensign on 1 November 1977.

After completing the Midshipmen's Supplementary Course in Australia, he was appointed navigation officer of RFNS Kiro in August 1978. At the end of that year, he was promoted to sub-lieutenant. In January 1979, Bainimarama embarked on the Chilean naval training ship, the Buque Escuela Esmeralda, which spent six months circumnavigating South America. On his return to Fiji in August, Bainimarama was appointed executive officer of RFNS Kiro.

After a brief navigation course in HMAS Watson in March 1982, Bainimarama underwent search and rescue training at the United States Coast Guard Centre in New York City. On his return to Fiji, he was appointed commander of RFNS Kikau, his first command post. He went on to command RFNS Kula, and spent four months in 1984 in the markings of the Exclusive Economic Zones of Tonga, Tuvalu, and Kiribati. After being promoted to lieutenant commander in February 1986, he departed for Sinai where he served for eighteen months with the Multinational Force and Observers.

Bainimarama returned to Fiji in September 1987. He took charge of the delivery of two naval ships, the Levuka and Lautoka, from Louisiana in the United States. He became commanding officer of the Fijian Navy in April 1988, and was promoted to the rank of commander on 4 October that year. He held this post for the next nine years.

Bainimarama underwent further training at the Malaysian Armed Forces Staff College in 1991 and at the Australian Defence Force Warfare Centre at RAAF Base Williamtown, Newcastle, New South Wales, where he studied Maritime Surveillance Training. This was followed by Disaster Management training at the Asian Institute of Technology in 1993, and Exclusive Economic Zone Management training at Dalhousie University, Canada, in 1994. He was promoted to the rank of captain in October of that year, and went on to attend the Australian Joint Services Staff College (JSSC). He attended the Integrated Logistics Support Overview course of the Australian Defence Co-operation Program on 23 September 1996, and the Chief of Army Conferences in Singapore in 1998 and 1999, as well as the Chief of Defence Conference in Hawaii.

Bainimarama was appointed as the acting chief of staff on 10 November 1997, and was confirmed in this post on 18 April 1998. On 1 March 1999, he was promoted to the rank of commodore and was named commander of the Armed Forces, to replace Brigadier-General Ratu Epeli Ganilau, who resigned to pursue a political career. It was in his capacity as commander of the Armed Forces that Bainimarama assumed command on 29 May 2000. He relinquished command on 5 March 2014, to Brigadier-General Mosese Tikoitoga. Bainimarama was promoted to the rank of rear admiral on his retirement in recognition of his military service.

=== Fiji coup of 2000 ===
A group led by George Speight, a businessman who had been declared bankrupt following the cancellation of several contracts by the government, entered Parliament buildings on 19 May 2000 and disaffected elements of the Fijian population rallied to his side. For 56 days Prime Minister Mahendra Chaudhry and most of his cabinet, along with many parliamentarians and their staff, were held as hostages while Speight attempted to negotiate with the president, Ratu Sir Kamisese Mara, who denounced the coup and declared a state of emergency.

Believing that President Kamisese Mara was not dealing effectively with the situation, Bainimarama forced Mara to resign on 29 May 2000, in what some politicians have since called "a coup within a coup", and formed an interim military government, which negotiated an accord under which the rebels would release all hostages, including the deposed Prime Minister Mahendra Chaudhry, and would surrender without penalty. The government later reneged on the last part of the agreement and arrested Speight on 27 July 2000, with Bainimarama saying that he had signed that part of the accord "under duress".

=== Post-2000 coup ===
Bainimarama attended a Leadership and Change Management course with the Public Service Training and Development program in February 2002, and a Policy Planning Analysis and Management course at the University of the South Pacific in Suva the following month. He went on to attend the Defence and Strategic Studies Annual Conference at the Australian Defence College in Canberra on 2 August, and the Program for Senior Executives in National and International Security at Harvard University in the United States from 18 to 30 August. In November that year, he was promoted to rear admiral, but this promotion was reverted to commodore on 1 February 2003. In 2014, he was made rear admiral again.

On 4 September 2003, Bainimarama attended the Pacific Armies Management Seminar XXVII in Seoul, South Korea, and went on to attend the PKO Capacity Building Seminar in the Philippine capital of Manila.

Despite his deteriorating relationship with the government, Bainimarama was reappointed commander of the Republic of Fiji Military Forces on 5 February 2004. That month, he attended the Pacific Area Special Operations Conference. This was followed by the Seminar Executive Course at the Asia Pacific Centre for Strategic Studies in Hawaii in April. In May and June, he attended the South East Asia Security Symposium. In September, he attended both the PAMS XXVII in the Indian capital of New Delhi, and the 7th Chief of Defence Conference in Tokyo, Japan.

On 14 December 2005, Bainimarama began an official visit to China, at the invitation of the People's Liberation Army.

== Political career ==
=== Fijian coup d'état, 2006 ===
On 31 October 2006, while Bainimarama was in Egypt visiting Fijian forces on peacekeeping duties in the Middle East, President Iloilo moved to terminate the appointment of Bainimarama, appointing instead Lieutenant Colonel Meli Saubulinayau who declined to take the position. Senior Fijian military officers backed Bainimarama, who quickly called on the Government to resign. The governments of Australia, New Zealand, the U.S. and others called for calm, and asked for assurances that the Fijian military not rise against the government.

In late November 2006, Bainimarama handed down a list of demands to Qarase, one of which was the withdrawal of three controversial bills, including the Qoliqoli Bill (which would have transferred ownership of maritime resources to the Fijian people) and the Reconciliation, Tolerance, and Unity Bill, which would have offered conditional pardons to persons convicted of involvement in the 2000 coup. Despite further talks in Suva and in Wellington, New Zealand, Bainimarama gave the Prime Minister Qarase an ultimatum of 4 December to accede to his demands or to resign. In a televised address, Qarase agreed to put the three race-based bills on hold, review the appointment of Andrew Hughes as police commissioner (Bainimarama had demanded his dismissal), and give the police the option of discontinuing investigations into the commander's alleged acts of sedition. He refused further concessions, saying that he had conceded all that was possible within the law.

Military manoeuvres followed, including the seizure of government vehicles and the house arrest of Prime Minister Qarase. On 5 December President Ratu Josefa Iloilo was said to have signed a legal order dissolving Parliament after meeting with Bainimarama. The president later issued a statement categorically denying signing any such decree, and the exiled Commissioner of Police, Andrew Hughes, implicated Iloilo's secretary in the fabrication of the decree at the direction of Commander Bainimarama.

As of 9 December, there were reported arrests of members of the media and open dissenters, as well as incidents of intimidation and violence committed against political figures.

Bainimarama told a press conference on 15 December that he would agree to attend a forthcoming meeting of the Great Council of Chiefs, the feudal body empowered to choose the country's president, vice-president, and fourteen of the thirty two Senators, only in his capacity as president of the Republic, the Fiji Sun reported.

On 6 September 2007, Bainimarama imposed a renewed state of emergency for one month, alleging that deposed Prime Minister Laisenia Qarase and his spokesman were spreading lies and attempting to cause destabilisation, following Qarase's return to Suva after having been confined to the island of Vanua Balavu since his ouster. Bainimarama said that Qarase and his spokesman should return to Vanuabalavu and that they could "talk from there".

Bainimarama became acting Minister of Finance on 18 August 2008 after Chaudhry and the other Labour Party ministers withdrew from the interim government.

==== Explaining the coup ====
The immediate cause of the military coup was Prime Minister Qarase's refusal to withdraw the Qoliqoli Bill. Bainimarama stated that his main reasons for overthrowing the Qarase government were that it was corrupt, and that it was conducting racially discriminatory policies against the country's Indo-Fijian minority. In a speech publicly announcing the coup, he stated that Qarase's policies had "divided the nation now and will have very serious consequences to our future generations". He added that "the passing of the Reconciliation, Qoliqoli and Land Claims [Bills] will undermine the Constitution, will deprive many citizens of their rights as guaranteed under the Constitution and compromise and undermine the integrity of the Constitutional Offices including the Judiciary". He explained that he would amend the race-based electoral rolls, so as to "lead us into peace and prosperity and mend the ever widening racial divide that currently besets our multicultural nation".

Addressing the United Nations General Assembly in September 2007, he stated:

"[I]n 1970, Fiji started its journey as a young nation on a rather shaky foundation, with a race-based Constitution, one which rigidly compartmentalised our communities. The 'democracy' which came to be practised in Fiji was marked by divisive, adversarial, inward-looking, race-based politics. The legacy of leadership, at both community and national levels, was a fractured nation. Fiji's people were not allowed to share a common national identity.

Of the two major communities, indigenous Fijians were instilled with fear of dominance and dispossession by Indo-Fijians, and they desired protection of their status as the indigenous people. Indo-Fijians, on the other hand, felt alienated and marginalised, as second-class citizens in their own country, the country of their birth, Fiji. [...]

Fiji's overall situation by 2006 had deteriorated sharply, heightened by massive corruption and lawlessness [...].

[P]olicies which promote racial supremacy [...] must be removed once and for all. [...] Fiji will look at making the necessary legal changes in the area of electoral reform, to ensure true equality at the polls. [...] [E]very person will be given the right to vote for only one candidate, irrespective of race or religion."

This was to be achieved, he declared, through a People's Charter for Change, Peace and Progress, the stated aim of which was to "rebuild Fiji into a non-racial, culturally-vibrant and united, well-governed, truly democratic nation that seeks progress, and prosperity through merit-based equality of opportunity, and peace".

In April 2009, he told The Australian's Graham Davis:

"My vision for Fiji is one that's free of racism. That's the biggest problem we've had in the last 20 years and it needs to be taken out. It's the lies that are being fed to indigenous Fijians that are causing this, especially from our chiefs who are the dominating factor in our lives. And the politicians take advantage of that. We need to change direction in a dramatic way. We need to get rid of Qarase and everything associated with the 2000 coup and begin entirely on a new path."

Davis noted that Bainimarama had introduced greater ethnic diversity into senior positions, and suggested that "maybe that's what drives Bainimarama most of all; the notion, however quixotic, of a multiracial meritocracy belatedly fulfilling the great promise Fiji had in its early post-independence years, when a visiting Pope John Paul II famously described it as a model for the developing world. Before the greed, the racism and the gun."

=== 2009 constitutional crisis ===
In April 2009, the Court of Appeal ruled the removal of the government during the 2006 coup was illegal. Bainimarama resigned as interim prime minister on 10 April. Iloilo then abolished the constitution, assumed all governing power, revoked all judicial appointments, and promptly reappointed Bainimarama as Prime Minister, only 24 hours after he had resigned. On 24 April, Bainimarama was made a Companion of the Order of Fiji in recognition of his "eminent achievement and merit of highest degree and service to Fiji and to humanity at large".

On 3 November 2009, Bainimarama banished the envoys of Australia and New Zealand, giving them 24 hours to leave the country.

=== Essential National Industries Decree ===
In September 2011, the Bainimarama government introduced a decree severely curtailing labour rights, so as to "ensure the present and continued viability and sustainability of essential national industries". In particular, the decree banned strikes in all but exceptional circumstances, subjecting them in addition to government authorization on a case-by-case basis. It also curtailed the right for workers to take their grievances to courts of law. The Fiji Trades Union Congress said the decree "offers major weapons to the employers to utilize against unions [...] It outlaws professional trade unionists, eliminates existing collective agreements, promotes a biased system of non-professional bargaining agents to represent workers, severely restricts industrial action, strengthens sanctions against legally striking workers and bans overtime payments and other allowances for workers in 24-hour operations". Attar Singh, general secretary for the Fiji Islands Council of Trade Unions, said: "We have never seen anything worse than this decree. It is without doubt designed to decimate unions [...] by giving [employers] an unfair advantage over workers and unions". Amnesty International said the decree threatened "fundamental human rights [...], including the right to freedom of association and assembly, and the right to organize".

=== Electoral victories ===
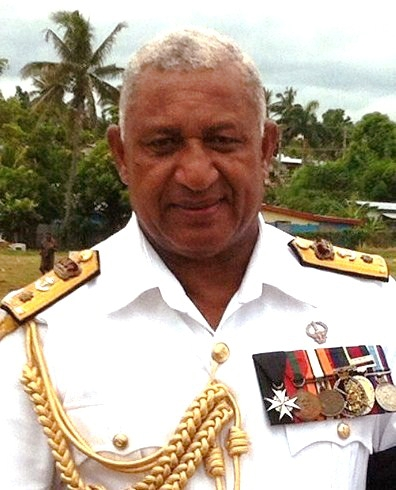
Bainimarama in 2014

Bainimarama promised the return of elections and democracy in 2014, and formed a party named FijiFirst. In the 2014 Fijian general election, FijiFirst won a majority and Bainimarama was sworn in as prime minister of Fiji by President Ratu Epeli Nailatikau. In the 2018 Fijian general election, FijiFirst won an outright majority, and Bainimarama became prime minister for a second term on 20 November 2018. In the 2022 Fijian general election, FijiFirst won a plurality but was unable to form a government, meaning Bainimarama would cease to be prime minister after 16 years of rule. He was succeeded by Sitiveni Rabuka on 24 December 2022. The same day, Bainimarama was elected leader of the opposition.

He has been described by some as a dictator or an authoritarian, although he denies these claims.

=== Suspension from Parliament and convictions ===
On 17 February 2023, Bainimarama was suspended from parliament for three years after making disparaging references to President Wiliame Katonivere and Prime Minister Sitiveni Rabuka, as well as making treasonous comments in breach of standing orders. He remained the opposition leader.

On 8 March 2023 Bainimarama resigned from Parliament and as leader of the opposition.

On 9 March 2023 Bainimarama was charged with abuse of office over allegations he and police commissioner Sitiveni Qiliho interfered with an investigation into financial mismanagement at the University of the South Pacific. The two were released on bail the next day after pleading not guilty. Bainimarama and Qiliho were acquitted on 12 October 2023. On 14 March 2024 the High Court of Fiji overturned the acquittal and convicted Bainimarama of attempting to pervert the course of justice and Qiliho of abuse of office. On 9 May 2024, he was sentenced to a year in jail. On 8 November, Fiji Corrections Service announced his early release from prison.

On 22 October 2025, Bainimarama was sentenced by the High Court to a 12-month suspended prison term after being found guilty on 2 October of "making an unwarranted demand with menace", becoming the first person in Fiji to be convicted under this new legal provision.

In February 2026 Bainimarama was arrested with former Police Commissioner Sitiveni Qiliho and charged with inciting mutiny over a 2023 meeting with senior military officers where they allegedly encouraged them to overthrow RFMF commander Jone Kalouniwai. On 19 March 2026, Bainimarama and Qiliho plead not guilty to charges of inciting mutiny against commander Kalouniwai.

Bainimarama endorsed the One Nation party in July 2026, saying that the party's values were similar to what he had stood for as Prime Minister. A number of One Nation's founders were previously members of FijiFirst.

== Cabinet ==
Office	Incumbent
Attorney General and Minister for Economy, Civil Service and Communications	Aiyaz Sayed-Khaiyum
Minister for Rural, Maritime Development and Disaster Management and Minister for Defence, National Security and Policing	Inia Seruiratu
Minister for Employment, Productivity, Industrial Relations, Youth and Sports	Parveen Bala
Minister for Infrastructure and Meteorological Services and Minister for Lands and Mineral Resources	Jone Usamate
Minister for Education, Heritage and Arts	Premila Kumar
Minister for Agriculture, Waterways and Environment	Mahendra Reddy
Minister for Women, Children and Poverty Alleviation	Mereseini Vuniwaqa
Minister for Forestry	Osea Naiqamu
Minister for Fisheries	Semi Koroilavesau
Minister for Local Government, Housing and Community Development	Premila Kumar
Minister for Commerce, Trade, Tourism & Transport	Faiyaz Koya
Minister for Health and Medical Services	Ifereimi Waqainabete

== Personal life ==
Bainimarama is married to Maria Makitalena; they have six children. He is a sports enthusiast, with a particular passion for rugby union and athletics; he became president of the Fiji Rugby Union on 31 May 2014. In January 2022, Bainimarama underwent heart surgery in Melbourne, Australia. During his recovery, Aiyaz Sayed-Khaiyum was named Acting Prime Minister. He returned to Fiji in March 2022.

== See also ==
- List of foreign ministers in 2017
- Office of the Prime Minister

Military offices
Preceded by Epeli Ganilau	Commander of the Republic of Fiji Military Forces; 1999–2014	Succeeded by Mosese Tikoitoga
Political offices
Preceded by Kamisese Mara	President of Fiji; Acting; 2000	Succeeded by Josefa Iloilo
Preceded by Josefa Iloilo	President of Fiji; Acting; 2006–2007	Succeeded by Josefa Iloilo
Preceded by Jona Senilagakali	Prime Minister of Fiji; 2014–2022; Acting: 2007–2014	Succeeded by Sitiveni Rabuka
Preceded by Epeli Nailatikau	Minister for Foreign Affairs; 2008–2009	Vacant
Vacant	Minister for Foreign Affairs; 2009	Succeeded by Inoke Kubuabola
Preceded by Timoci Natuva	Minister for Immigration, National Security and Defence; 2016	Succeeded by Inoke Kubuabola
Preceded by Inoke Kubuabola	Minister for Foreign Affairs; 2016–2019	Succeeded by Inoke Kubuabola
Preceded by Inia Seruiratu	Minister for Foreign Affairs; 2020–2022	Succeeded by Sitiveni Rabuka
Preceded by Naiqama Lalabalavu	Leader of the Opposition; 2022–2023	Succeeded by Inia Seruiratu
Party political offices
New political party	Leader of FijiFirst; 2014–2024	Succeeded by Disestablished
