= High Court of Fiji =

Section of the judiciary system in Fiji

The High Court of Fiji is one of three courts that was established by Chapter 9 of the 1997 Constitution of Fiji — the others being the Court of Appeal and the Supreme Court. The Constitution empowered Parliament to create other courts; these were to be subordinate to the High Court, which was authorized to oversee all proceedings of such courts. The High Court had unlimited original jurisdiction to hear and determine any civil or criminal proceedings under any law and such other original jurisdiction as is conferred on it under the Constitution.

The High Court consists of the Chief Justice and at least ten (and no more than eighteen) puisne judges. Parliament may also allow for junior judges, called Masters of the High Court, to sit on the High Court. Section 129 of the Constitution declares that "A judge who has sat in a trial of a matter that is the subject of appeal to a higher court must not sit in the appeal." As the membership of the High Court overlaps to a large extent with that of the Appeal Court and the Supreme Court, this clause is inserted to prevent a conflict of interest.

In 2007, following the military coup, six Australian and New Zealand judges resigned from the court. They were replaced by two Malaysian judges, "with more appointments from Asia expected to follow soon".

Until July 2007, under the High Court Act, foreign judges appointed to the High Court had to be nationals of one of the following countries: Australia, New Zealand, Canada, Papua New Guinea, Samoa, Sri Lanka, Tonga, or the United Kingdom. In practice, appointees were almost exclusively nationals of Australia and New Zealand. In July 2007, President Ratu Josefa Iloilovatu Uluivuda issued the High Court Act (Amendment) Promulgation, which extended the list to "any country which is at the time of the appointment a member of the Commonwealth of Nations". The Promulgation particularly highlighted Singapore, Malaysia, Hong Kong and India as potential sources for the appointment of new judges. Hong Kong was specifically cited as an authorised source for judges despite not being a member of the Commonwealth. The Promulgation was approved by the Cabinet led by interim Prime Minister Voreqe Bainimarama.

== See also ==
- Constitution of Fiji: Chapter 9 (detailing the composition and role of the judiciary)
