= 1997 Constitution of Fiji =

1997–2009 supreme law of Fiji

The 1997 Constitution of Fiji was the supreme law of Fiji from its adoption in 1997 until 2009 when President Josefa Iloilo purported to abrogate it. It was also suspended for a period following the 2000 coup d'état led by George Speight.

== Background ==
The Constitution of the Republic of the Fiji Islands dates from 1997. It is Fiji's third Constitution. The first, adopted in 1970 upon independence, was abrogated following two military coups in 1987. A second constitution was adopted in 1990. Its discriminatory provisions, which reserved the office of Prime Minister and a built-in majority in the House of Representatives for indigenous Fijians (although they were at that time a minority of the population) proved very unpopular with the Indo-Fijian community, which comprised almost half the country's population, and in the mid 1990s the government agreed that it should be rewritten.

== Constitutional process ==
In 1995, President Ratu Sir Kamisese Mara appointed a three-member Constitutional Review Commission. The commissioners were Tomasi Vakatora, an ethnic Fijian, and Brij Lal, an Indo-Fijian, with Sir Paul Reeves, a former Governor-General of New Zealand, as chairman. Fourteen months of consultations followed. The Commission finally presented its report, containing 697 recommendations, to the President on 6 September 1996. The report was subsequently tabled in Parliament, at a joint sitting of the Senate and the House of Representatives, on 11 September. A parliamentary committee, composed of members of both chambers, was established to study the report.

Eight months later, the committee tabled its response in Parliament on 14 May 1997, endorsing most of the recommendations. The Great Council of Chiefs, a powerful gathering of mainly high chiefs which, among other prerogatives, elects the President of Fiji, also endorsed the report in June. The Constitution (Amendment) Bill 1997 was passed by the House of Representatives on 3 July that year, and by the Senate on 10 July. President Mara signed it into law on 25 July 1997. It took effect from 27 July. Under its provisions, ethnic Fijians agreed to give up their guaranteed majority in the House of Representatives and their monopoly on the Prime Minister's office, but in return, their ownership of most of the land was written into the constitution. Their rights were also protected by institutionalising of the Great Council of Chiefs, which retained its power to elect the President and 14 of the 32 Senators.

The 1997 constitution was only the second national constitution to explicitly protect against discrimination based on sexual orientation (section 38). The first one was South Africa's in 1996.

== 2000 and 2006 coups, 2009 abrogation ==
The 1997 constitution was abrogated by Commodore Frank Bainimarama, who organised a counter-coup to neutralise a civilian coup d'état led by George Speight, and subsequently formed an Interim Military Government. A Supreme Court decision in November, however, reinstated the constitution, and new parliamentary elections under it were held in September 2001.

On 5 December 2006, the Military again overthrew the government. Commodore Bainimarama, who once again became acting Head of State, stated that the Constitution would remain in effect, but said on 17 December that "as a last resort", it could be abrogated if no other way could be found to ensure immunity from prosecution for soldiers involved in the takeover.

In the April 2009 crisis, President Josefa Iloilo suspended the Constitution and dismissed all judges after the Court of Appeal ruled the military government from 2006 illegal.

== Document ==
The Fijian Constitution comprises seventeen chapters. The links in the index on this page are to articles summarising their contents, along with the interpretation and the historical background, including reasons for their provision. Ongoing controversies are also noted.

=== Preamble ===
WE, THE PEOPLE OF FIJI,

- RECOGNISING the indigenous people or the iTaukei, their ownership of iTaukei lands, their unique culture, customs, traditions and language;
- RECOGNISING the indigenous people or the Rotuman from the island of Rotuma, their ownership of Rotuman lands, their unique culture, customs, traditions and language;
- RECOGNISING the descendants of the indentured labourers from British India and the Pacific Islands, their culture, customs, traditions and language; and
- RECOGNISING the descendants of the immigrants and settlers to Fiji, their culture, customs, traditions and language,

DECLARE that we are all Fijians united by common and equal citizenry;

RECOGNISE the Constitution as the supreme law of our country that provides the framework for the conduct of Government and all Fijians;

COMMIT ourselves to the recognition and protection of human rights, and respect for human dignity;

DECLARE our commitment to justice, national sovereignty and security, social and economic wellbeing, and safeguarding our environment;

HEREBY ESTABLISH THIS CONSTITUTION FOR THE REPUBLIC OF FIJI.

— Preamble to the Constitution of Fiji

== Amendments ==
At the end of September 2005, the government introduced legislation to amend the Constitution so as to allow parliamentarians and other senior government officials to serve as members of Provincial Councils, the Fijian Affairs Board, or the Great Council of Chiefs. Prime Minister Laisenia Qarase told the House of Representatives that the amendments, to which the Opposition Fiji Labour Party had agreed at the Tanaloa Talks in 2003, were necessary to allow chiefs to hold multiple positions if their subjects so wished.

In 2005, several prominent figures were affected by the constitutional ban on politicians holding other public offices. These included Ro Teimumu Kepa, the Paramount Chief of the Burebasaga Confederacy, who was required to relinquish her chairmanship of the Rewa Provincial Council, which was deemed to be incompatible with her position as a member of the House of Representatives and as a Cabinet Minister.

Even though the Labour Party agreed to the amendments in 2003, it has indicated that it will oppose them now. The FLP is bitterly opposed to other government legislation, such as the Reconciliation, Tolerance, and Unity Bill which may be passed with a simple majority, and it is thought that its stated intention to oppose these amendments, which require a two-thirds majority in both houses, may be a ploy to force the government to negotiate on the Unity Bill.

== New Constitution for 2013 ==
In July 2009, following the suspension of the Constitution in April, interim Prime Minister Voreqe Bainimarama announced that Fiji would have a new Constitution—its fourth—by 2013. It would remove the ethnic-based provisions of the electoral system. The voting age would be lowered to 18, and the number of seats in Parliament, as well as the "need for a Senate", would be reviewed during the preparatory phase. The new Constitution would derive from the People's Charter for Change, Peace and Progress, and from "extensive" consultations with political parties, non-governmental organisations and ordinary citizens.

== See also ==
- People's Charter for Change, Peace and Progress
