= 2014 Fijian general election =

- 17 September 2014

All 50 seats in the Parliament of Fiji 26 seats needed for a majority
- Registered: 591,101
- Turnout: 84.60% (▼3.05pp)
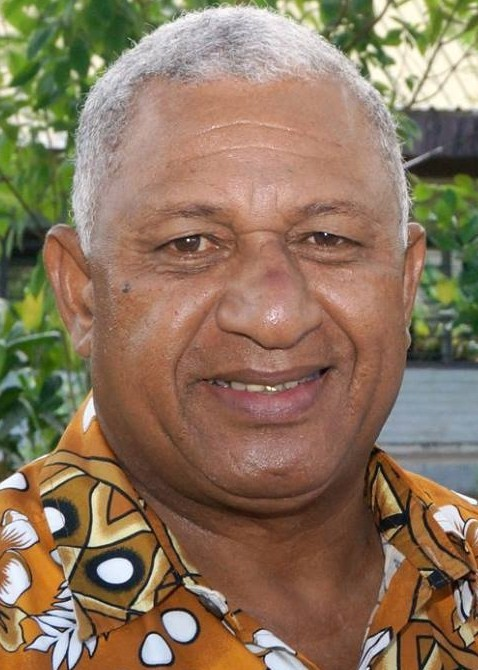

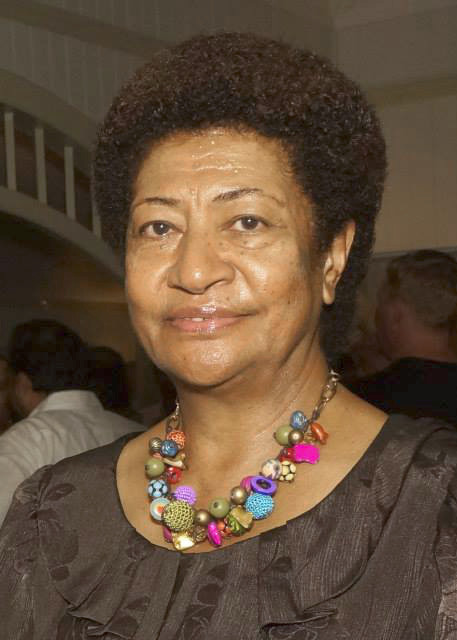

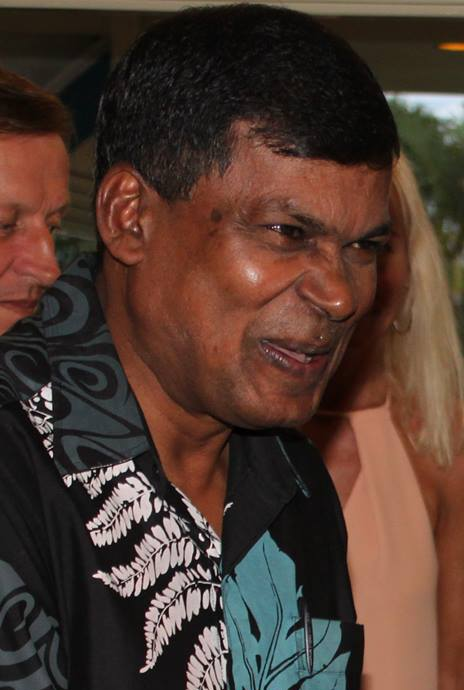
	First party	Second party	Third party
Leader	Frank Bainimarama	Teimumu Kepa	Biman Prasad
Party	FijiFirst	SODELPA	NFP
Last election	–	36 (Note: Compared to the party's predecessor, Soqosoqo Duavata ni Lewenivanua.)	0
Seats won	32	15	3
Seat change	New	▼21	▲3
Popular vote	293,714	139,857	27,066
Percentage	59.17%	28.18%	5.45%
Prime Minister before election
Frank Bainimarama
Independent
Subsequent Prime Minister
Frank Bainimarama
FijiFirst

General elections were held in Fiji on 17 September 2014 to select the 50 members of Parliament. The FijiFirst party, led by Prime Minister Frank Bainimarama, won a landslide victory, winning 32 of the 50 seats. The Social Democratic Liberal Party and the National Federation Party were the only other two parties to cross the 5% electoral threshold and win seats. The Fiji Labour Party failed to win a seat for the first time since its foundation in the 1980s.

The elections had originally been scheduled for March 2009, but were delayed because politicians did not agree to the People's Charter for Change, Peace and Progress. Between 2009 and 2014 several public announcements and requests were made for elections, and on 23 March 2014 the interim government announced the elections would be held on 17 September 2014. The elections were to be held under the new constitution which lowered the voting age to 18 and gave the right of multiple citizenship to Fijians for the first time.

== Background ==
After the Fijian military coup of 5 December 2006, the new interim prime minister Jona Senilagakali announced that elections would take place held "hopefully in 12 months, two years". Later the military regime made it clear that none of the ministers in the interim government would be allowed to contest the elections.

On 6 January 2007 Commodore Frank Bainimarama, the leader of the coup, succeeded Senilagakali as interim Prime Minister. On 29 January 2007, Bainimarama announced that the next election would be around five years away. He informed a visiting regional delegation on 30–31 January that elections would have to wait until a census had been completed, a new voters' roll compiled, and boundaries of electoral districts defined. Meanwhile, interim Attorney-General Aiyaz Sayed-Khaiyum suggested using electronic voting to shorten the period of time for counting votes (previously over ten days), and thereby reduce the potential for election rigging.

Later, Bainimarama announced changes to the electoral system that would abolish the race-based constituencies and that elections would take place in 2010. It was later clarified that the interim administration has no mandate for electoral and constitutional reform, as such changes have to go through the parliamentary process; as such, the proposed 2010 election would take place under the current race-based system, but Bainimarama stated he wished the next government to change the electoral system. In mid-June 2007, Bainimarama gave in to demands from the European Union, Australia and New Zealand to hold polls by 28 February 2009; he also requested assistance with election preparations.

The deposed Prime Minister, Laisenia Qarase, stated he would contest the elections. By contrast, Bainimarama said that he had no intention of taking part in the election.

In March 2008, responding to regional pressure for concrete evidence of his commitment to hold elections in 2009, Bainimarama argued:

"Elections are central to democracy but they are not always, on their own, a magic or quick-fix solution. How can an election, on its own, make a difference when it is based on divisive and race based communal electoral arrangements? How can an election, on its own, solve the deep differences that our constitution has perpetuated between the different races in our country? Unless there are fundamental reforms, how can an election succeed where it will take us straight back to the grimy old politics of self interest, cronyism and scam mongering?"

In April 2008, Finance Minister Mahendra Chaudhry stated that it was necessary to complete and implement the People's Charter for Change and Progress before holding any elections. In May, Commodore Bainimarama said that elections would not take place in March 2009 unless politicians agreed to the Charter.

Ousted Vice-President Ratu Joni Madraiwiwi remarked that the next election would likely be won by "a Fijian-dominated political party" (meaning indigenous-dominated), and asked what the military would do in such a case.

Bainimarama stated that Qarase's Soqosoqo Duavata ni Lewenivanua party would be authorised to take part in the election, but that, if elected, Qarase would have to abide by the People's Charter. He would not be authorised to introduce or re-introduce policies – such as the Reconciliation, Tolerance and Unity Bill- which Bainimarama perceived to be racist. Bainimarama warned Qarase publicly that doing so would result in a new coup: "If you do it, I'll remove you." In March 2010, however, Bainimarama stated that "any politician who has played a role in the country's politics, since 1987" would be prevented from standing for election. The rationale was that "Fiji needs new politicians".

The Charter would serve as a guideline in this respect. Attorney-General Aiyaz Sayed-Khaiyum stated that "the People's Charter sets a trend or course for which the people of Fiji should actually assess political parties on and political parties that are essentially try [sic] to contest elections purely based on ethnic politics would not be entertained by the people of Fiji".

Despite his earlier commitment not to run, Bainimarama founded and led the Fiji First party into the election. Mahendra Chaudhry was ruled to be ineligible to stand for election.

=== Date ===
In April 2009 the Fijian government announced that elections would take place "by September 2014". Bainimarama reiterated this in July, specifying that the elections would be held under the provisions of a new Constitution, which would eliminate institutionalised ethnic-based voting. The new Constitution might also amend the number of seats in Parliament, and possibly abolish the Senate.

In February 2010 a petition, reportedly supported by 600,000 signatories, requested elections by the end of the year. Commodore Bainimarama responded that an early election would not be "practical and realistic": "The implementation of the fundamental changes and reforms captured in the People's Charter and which are now being implemented under the framework of the Roadmap – this is the only plan – or priority for Fiji. It is a plan that is objective of a better Fiji – where all benefit and not just the elite few – as has been the case previously." He dismissed what he called "irresponsible demands and proposals of selfish individuals and groups that run counter to the Charter and the road-map".

In March 2011 the New Zealand Foreign Minister Murray McCully announced that New Zealand would lift its travel ban on members of the Fiji administration if the government committed to holding elections in 2014, and allowing "all stakeholders [...] to participate and not only those favoured by the regime". (Until then, New Zealand had insisted on earlier elections.) Fiji Foreign Affairs Minister Ratu Inoke Kubuabola replied that the Fiji government was "committed to ensuring that a good and fair election is conducted" in 2014.

On 30 June 2012 voter registration for the 2014 elections began in Suva. A few days later a Western diplomat confirmed that Fiji was on-schedule for elections in 2014: "It seems fairly clear now that there will be elections of some description in Fiji in 2014. The real question is the extent to which those elections meet minimal international standards for being free and fair. Crucial to answering that question is seeing whether everyone is allowed to compete, and the media and civil society are able to operate in a minimally unimpeded manner."

Finally, on 23 March 2014, the Fiji government announced that the elections would take place on 17 September of that year, a day to be declared a national holiday.

A media blackout on campaign activities ran from Monday to Wednesday, the election day. The ban included newspapers, radio, television, campaign poster and social media posts by any Fijian.

== Electoral system ==
The elections were held using the open list form of party-list proportional representation using the D'Hondt method in one nationwide constituency consisting of 50 seats. There is a threshold of 5% of the vote for a list to gain representation.

Pre-polling for the elections began two weeks prior to the main election date to cater for those unable to travel long distances to cast their vote. It ended on 15 September. A 48-hour blackout period began soon after, during which no media, including print or social, is allowed to print or post any election material which insinuates campaigning.

Almost 590,000 citizens registered to vote in the elections. 57,084 voters were registered to vote in Lautoka at 141 polling stations.

== Campaign ==
Seven parties registered to contest the elections, with a total of 248 candidates nominated, of which two were independents.

== Opinion polls ==
=== Approval ratings ===
==== Satisfaction of Frank Bainimarama as Prime Minister ====
Source	iTaukei	Indo-Fijian	Total
Lowy Institute	60%	75%	66%

=== Preferred prime minister ===
View source data.
Graphical summary of opinion polls for voting intention

Pollster(s)	Date	Bainimarama	Kepa	Prasad	Anthony	Chaudhry	Other	Lead
Fiji Sun	29 Mar 2014	80%	9%	0%	—	4%	7%	+71%
Fiji Sun	6 Apr 2014	76%	4%	0%	0%	2%	17%	+72%
Fiji Sun	3 May 2014	78%	1%	8%	—	2%	11%	+70%
Fiji Sun	31 May 2014	79%	6%	4%	0%	1%	—	+73%
Fiji Sun	14 Jun 2014	82%	7%	5%	1%	0%	5%	+75%
Fiji Sun	12 Jul 2014	79%	8%	5%	2%	1%	5%	+71%
Fiji Sun	19 Jul 2014	84%	6%	6%	1%	1%	—	+78%

=== Voting intention ===
View source data.
Graphical summary of opinion polls for voting intention

Pollster(s)	Date	FijiFirst	SODELPA	NFP	PDP	Labour	Unsure	Lead
Fiji Sun	29 Mar 2014	51%	5%	0%	2%	4%	38%	+46%
Fiji Sun	6 Apr 2014	47%	5%	0%	1%	2%	45%	+42%
Fiji Sun	3 May 2014	49%	2%	6%	9%	2%	32%	+40%
Fiji Sun	17 May 2014	67%	7%	5%	4%	2%	—	+60%
Fiji Sun	31 May 2014	68%	6%	4%	3%	1%	—	+62%
Fiji Sun	14 Jun 2014	80%	6%	6%	1%	1%	—	+74%
Fiji Sun	12 Jul 2014	78%	8%	5%	3%	1%	5%	+70%
Fiji Sun	9 Aug 2014	56%	17%	2%	1%	2%	11%	+39%

== Results ==
Party	Votes	%	Seats	+/–
FijiFirst	293,714	59.17	32	New
Social Democratic Liberal Party	139,857	28.18	15	–21
National Federation Party	27,066	5.45	3	+3
People's Democratic Party	15,864	3.20	0	New
Fiji Labour Party	11,670	2.35	0	–31
One Fiji Party	5,839	1.18	0	New
Fiji United Freedom Party	1,072	0.22	0	New
Independents	1,282	0.26	0	–2
Total	496,364	100.00	50	–21
Valid votes	496,364	99.26		
Invalid/blank votes	3,714	0.74		
Total votes	500,078	100.00		
Registered voters/turnout	591,101	84.60		
Source: Ratuva & Lawson

=== By division ===
Division	FijiFirst	SODELPA	NFP	PDP	FLP	OFP	FAP	Ind.	Total votes
Central	55.9%	32.7%	4.9%	2.7%	2.0%	1.2%	0.2%	0.3%	207,511
Eastern	28.6%	63.2%	2.3%	3.0%	1.6%	1.0%	0.3%	0.1%	19,291
Northern	52.3%	36.2%	4.7%	2.8%	2.0%	1.6%	0.1%	0.2%	74,233
Western	68.8%	16.3%	6.6%	3.9%	3.0%	0.9%	0.3%	0.2%	188,143
Postal votes	54.7%	32.7%	7.3%	2.3%	1.4%	1.1%	0.1%	0.4%	7,186
Fiji	59.2%	28.2%	5.5%	3.2%	2.4%	1.2%	0.2%	0.3%	496,364
Source: 2014 General Election Report

== Aftermath ==
The election was endorsed as "credible" by international observers, including by Australia, Indonesia and New Zealand. Some shortcomings were however noted, such as a restrictive media framework which limited Fijian journalists' ability to "examine rigorously the claims of candidates and parties", a short timeframe for the election and a complex voting system. Leaders of several of the opposition parties protested the result, claiming ballot tampering.

== See also ==
- List of members of the Parliament of Fiji (2014–2018)
