= Local elections in Fiji =

Local elections in Fiji are held for two cities (Suva and Lautoka) and ten towns (Ba, Labasa, Lami, Levuka, Nadi, Nausori, Nasinu, Savusavu, Sigatoka, and Tavua). Each city or town has a council comprising between 8 and 20 members, elected for three-year terms, although the government announced legislation on 15 February 2006 to extend the term to four years. Each city or town council elects from among its own members a Mayor (or Lord Mayor in the case of Suva) for one year. Consecutive terms are permitted.

== Electoral politics ==
Electoral politics in municipal elections has certain characteristics that set it apart from national politics. Political parties often do regard municipal polls as a trial run for national elections; in the 1985 election for the Suva City Council, for example, the newly formed Fiji Labour Party (FLP) showed that it was on the rise by winning 8 of the 20 seats. It went on to win the parliamentary election in 1987. Local issues also come into play, however:

- At the national level, the National Federation Party (NFP) was left unrepresented in the House of Representatives after the disastrous results of the 1999 and 2001 elections, but remained strong at the municipal level. In 2006, the NFP retained power in Ba and Nadi, shared power in a coalition with the Soqosoqo Duavata ni Lewenivanua (SDL) in Sigatoka, and was the second largest party in the Suva City Council.
- In 2003, Suva's 5 councillors from the FLP teamed up with the 7 councillors from the Soqosoqo Duavata ni Lewenivanua (SDL) - its arch-rival in national politics - to elect the SDL candidate, Ratu Peni Volavola, to the office of Lord Mayor.
- In the city of Lautoka, a purely local political party, the Sugar City Ratepayers Alliance, contested the 2005 election (but failed to win any seats). A number of other parties operating only at the municipal level contested other town councils, winning control of councils in Labasa, Lami, Levuka, Nausori, Savusavu, and Tavua. Some have been unsuccessful.

== Post-2006 developments ==
The regime that took power in a military coup on 5 December 2006 later dismissed all elected municipal bodies, appointing Special Administrators to run the cities and towns. In some cases, a single Administrator was responsible for more than one town.

In 2025 it was announced that 2025 Fijian local elections would take place.
