= Local government in Fiji =

Fiji is divided administratively into four divisions, which are further subdivided into fourteen provinces. Each province has a provincial council.

== Administrative divisions ==
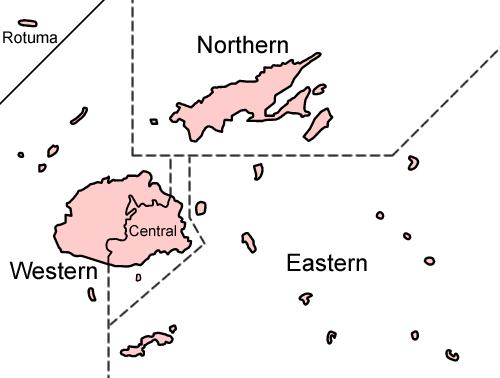
The four divisions of Fiji

The fourteen provinces of Fiji

Fiji is divided administratively into four divisions, which are further subdivided into fourteen provinces; the self-governing island of Rotuma and its nearby islets lie outside any of the four divisions. Each division is headed by a Commissioner, appointed by the Fijian government.

The divisions are basically agglomerations of provinces and have few administrative functions of their own, but serve to foster cooperation among the member provinces for providing services.

=== Provinces ===
Division (Capital)	Province	Area km^{2}	Population (2007)	Population (2017)
Central (Suva)	Naitasiri	1666	160,760	177,678
Central (Suva)	Namosi	570	6,898	7,871
Central (Suva)	Rewa	272	100,995	108,016
Central (Suva)	Serua	830	18,249	20,031
Central (Suva)	Tailevu	955	55,692	64,552
Northern (Labasa)	Bua	1378	14,176	15,466
Northern (Labasa)	Cakaudrove	2816	49,344	50,469
Northern (Labasa)	Macuata	2004	72,441	65,983
Eastern (Levuka)	Kadavu	478	10,167	10,897
Eastern (Levuka)	Lau	487	10,683	9,602
Eastern (Levuka)	Lomaiviti	411	16,253	15,657
Western (Lautoka)	Ba	2634	231,760	247,708
Western (Lautoka)	Nadroga-Navosa	2385	58,387	58,931
Western (Lautoka)	Ra	1341	29,464	30,432
Rotuma		46	2,002	1,594

== Provincial council ==
Each province has a provincial council which may make bylaws and impose rates (local taxes), subject to the approval of the iTaukei Affairs Board a government department. The board must also approve the appointment of the Roko Tui, or executive head of the provincial council, who is usually a high chief, although in recent years, commoners have sometimes been chosen.

The provinces used to have direct input into national affairs through the Great Council of Chiefs and the Senate. The Great Council of Chiefs was a traditional body which advised the government on indigenous affairs and also functioned as an electoral college to elect the President and Vice-President; 42 of the 55 members of the Great Council were chosen by the provincial councils, three from each province. In addition, 14 of the 32 members of the Senate, the upper house of the Fijian Parliament, were chosen by the provincial councils (one Senator each) and confirmed by the Great Council of Chiefs. The Military-backed interim government that seized power in a military coup on 5 December 2006 formally abolished the Great Council of Chiefs in 2012, and the 2013 Constitution promulgated by the regime similarly abolished the Senate. This effectively ended provincial input into national government affairs.

== Island of Rotuma ==
The island of Rotuma, north of the main archipelago, is a self-governing dependency according to the Rotuma Act promulgated in 1927. The Fiji government includes it in the Eastern Division for statistical purposes (such as the census), but it has its own council, which is empowered to legislate on most local matters. Like a province, Rotuma used to choose (through its council) 3 members of the Great Council of Chiefs and 1 Senator.

== Provincial administration ==
Below the provincial level, districts and villages, based on extended family networks, have their own chiefs and councils. Indigenous Fijian administration is based on the koro, or village, headed by a Turaga ni Koro elected or appointed by the villagers. Several koros combine to form a Tikina, two or more of which comprise a province. In addition, municipal governments have been established for the cities of Suva and Lautoka, and for ten towns. Each has a city or town council elected for a three-year term, presided over by a Mayor chosen by the councillors from among their own members. On 15 February 2006, the government announced legislation to change the local government term of office from three years to four.

Provincial administration, and its subdivisions, cater for ethnic Fijians, town and city councils cater for urban residents of all races. Local authorities have also been established for rural areas, with advisory powers, and these provide a voice to people of all races outside the provincial structure. The Ministry of Regional Development ensures that Fiji's rural areas are provided with the access to opportunities and basic amenities that are enjoyed by the urban areas. This is done through its district administrations which are involved in community capacity building, coordinating the development projects like upgrading of rural roads, upgrading of cane access roads, development of roads for access to cash crops and other capital programs in their respective districts. They also attend to some statutory functions such as registration of births, deaths and marriages, liquor licences and acting as Third Class Magistrates.

== Districts ==
Fiji is divided into 17 districts, each with a district officer and five sub-districts with assistant district officers. The districts generally centre on towns and cities, but some follow provincial or tikina boundaries. The districts are: Ra, Tavua, Ba, Nadi, Nadarivatu, Keiyasi, Nausori, Navua, Vunidawa, Suva, Korovou, Macuata, Savusavu, Bua, Taveuni, Seaqaqa, Saqani, Tukavesi, Kadavu, Rotuma, Lomaiviti, Lautoka.

== Towns and cities ==
Location	Founded	Mayor (party)	Councillors	Area (km^{2})	Pop. (2017)
Ba	1939	Parveen Bala (NFP)	15	327	13,825
Labasa	1939	Pradeep Singh (FLP)	12	360	22,204
Lami	1977	Tevita Buatalevu (SDL)	12	680	20,217
Lautoka (city)	1929	Rohit Kumar (FLP)	16	1607	60,925
Levuka	1877	George Gibson (Balance)	8	67	3,277
Nadi	1946	Shalesh Mudliar (NFP)	15	577	62,214
Nasinu	1999	Rajeshwar Kumar (FLP)	21	4500	79,782
Nausori	1931	Vikash Singh (NRA)	12	167	50,398
Savusavu	1969	Ram Pillay (SRC)	9	800	5,494
Sigatoka	1959	Ratu Isikeli Tasere (SDL/NFP)	10	127	8,940
Suva (city)	1881	Ratu Peni Volavola (SDL)	20	2048	78,520
Tavua	1992	Chandra Singh (TRLTA)	9	100	7,592
FLP: Fiji Labour Party; NFP: National Federation Party; NRA: Nausori Ratepayers' Association; SDL: Soqosoqo Duavata ni Lewenivanua; SRC: Savusavu Ratepayers and Citizens Party; TRLTA: Tavua Ratepayers, Landowners, and Tenants Association

== See also ==
- ISO 3166-2:FJ
