= List of ambassadors of Fiji to China =

Coordinates: 39.945429°N 116.451305°E

Ambassador of Fiji to China
- Inaugural holder: Luke Ratuvuki
- Formation: 2001

The Fijian ambassador in Beijing is the official representative of the government in Suva to the Government of the People's Republic of China.

== History ==
- In 1975, the Republic of the Fiji Islands was the first government of the Pacific to establish diplomatic relations with the Government of the People's Republic of China.
- In 1976 the government of Beijing established an embassy in Suva Fiji.
- From 1982, the Fijian ambassador to Tokyo (Japan) was concurrently accredited in China.
- In 2001, Fiji opened its embassy in Beijing.

== List of representatives ==
Diplomatic agrément/Diplomatic accreditation	Ambassador	Observations	Prime Minister of Fiji	List of premiers of China	Term end
2001	Luke Ratuvuki		Laisenia Qarase	Zhu Rongji	April 2004
April 2004	Jeremaia Waqanisau		Laisenia Qarase	Wen Jiabao	2006
2007	James Ah Koy		Frank Bainimarama	Wen Jiabao	March 15, 2011
March 15, 2011	Esala Teleni		Frank Bainimarama	Wen Jiabao	November 2014
March 16, 2015	Ioane Naivalurua		Frank Bainimarama		September 9, 2017
July 25, 2018	Manasa Tagicakibau		Frank Bainimarama		

== See also ==
- China–Fiji relations
