= Sukuna Bowl =

Fijian annual rugby union fixture

Ratu Sukuna Bowl
- Sport: Rugby union
- Founded: 1951; 75 years ago
- No. of teams: 2
- Countries: Fiji
- Most recent champion: Fiji Police Force (2025)
- Most titles: Fiji Police Force (36 titles)

The Ratu Sukuna Bowl is an annual rugby union fixture in Fiji that is contested between the Fiji Police Force and the Republic of Fiji Military Forces since 1951. It is usually played at the ANZ National Stadium in Suva, Fiji.

== History ==
The Ratu Sukuna Bowl was established in 1951, it was created by Ratu Sir Lala Sukuna as a common ground to foster brotherhood between the two forces. It is contested between the Fiji Police Force and the Republic of Fiji Military Forces. Police has won the Ratu Sukuna Bowl 35 times times while Army has won it 27 times.

The 2015 Sukuna Bowl took place at the ANZ Stadium in Suva, Fiji. The Fiji Police Force won the match against the Republic of Fiji Military Forces.

In 2022, the original 70-year-old Tanoa which is usually contested for, was replaced because it was destroyed in a fire in December 2021. The replacement tanoa was jointly dedicated by the Police chaplain and the RFMF Reverend. The women's competition was introduced in 2022 and was won by the RFMF Women.

Police retained the Bowl in 2023 after an 11-all draw against Army at Prince Charles Park in Nadi. It was the fourth time that a draw occurred in the competition.

In 2025, the Fiji Police Force successfully defended their title after they defeated Army 26–10 at Subrail Park in Labasa. However, the Army Women defeated Police 25–23 to claim the women’s title.

== Past winners ==
Men
| Year | Winner | Points | Opposition |
|---|---|---|---|
| 1951–2008 | N/A | | |
| 2009 | Police | 14–11 | Army |
| 2010 | Army | 14–0 | Police |
| 2011 | Army | | |
| 2012 | Police | 17–15 | Army |
| 2013 | Police | 25–24 | Army |
| 2014 | Army | 18–10 | Police |
| 2015 | Police | 25–17 | Army |
| 2016 | Police | 22–12 | Army |
| 2017 | Army | 19–12 | Police |
| 2018 | Police | 41–17 | Army |
| 2019 | Army | 20–17 | Police |
| 2020 | Police | 32–8 | Army |
| 2021 | | | |
| 2022 | | | |
| 2023 | Police | 11–11 | Army |
| 2024 | | | |
| 2025 | Police | 26–10 | Army |

Women
| Year | Winner | Points | Opposition |
|---|---|---|---|
| 2022 | Army | 13–7 | Police |
| 2023 | Army | | Police |
| 2024 | Army | | Police |
| 2025 | Army | 25–23 | Police |

== See also ==
- Rugby union in Fiji
