= 2002 Fijian local elections =

Local elections were held in Fiji in October 2002. The results allowed the three major political parties, Soqosoqo Duavata ni Lewenivanua (SDL), the Fiji Labour Party (FLP) and the National Federation Party (NFP) to claim a victory of sorts. The elections, which take place every three years, were for two city councils and ten town councils throughout Fiji.

== Results by municipality ==
The results showed considerable variation from one municipality to another, indicating that local rather than national issues played a prominent role in the election. The NFP, which suffered disastrous defeats in the national elections of 1999 and 2001, failing to win a single seat in the House of Representatives, remained strong at the municipal level, while the SDL and the FLP, despite their fierce and sometimes bitter rivalry in national politics, forged an alliance after the election to control the Suva City Council.

=== Suva ===
2005 Suva City Council election
- All 20 seats of the City Council; 10 seats needed for a majority
Party	Leader	Vote %	Seats	+/–
RA			8	
SDL			7	
Labour			5	
This lists parties that won seats. See the complete results below.
Lord Mayor before	Lord Mayor after
Chandu Umaria	Chandu Umaria

The Ratepayers Alliance, a coalition dominated by the NFP, won 8 of the 20 seats on the Suva City Council. The SDL won 7 and the FLP, 5. The Ratepayers Alliance and the SDL initially formed a coalition to reelect Chandu Umaria as Lord Mayor, but the coalition fell apart a year later when the SDL forged an alliance with the FLP to elect Ratu Peni Volavola to the office.

FLP support was concentrated in the Samabula Ward, where it won all five seats. In previous municipal election, held in 1999 the FLP had won no seats on the city council.

=== Nadi ===
2002 Nadi Town Council election
- All 15 seats on the Town Council; 8 seats needed for a majority
Party	Leader	Vote %	Seats	+/–
NFP			10	
Labour			5	
This lists parties that won seats. See the complete results below.

The NFP retained its hold on the Nadi Town Council, winning 10 of the 15 seats. The other 5 seats, all from the Martintar Ward, were won by the FLP, which had won no seats in 1999.

=== Lautoka ===
2002 Lautoka Town Council election
- All 15 seats of the City Council; 8 seats needed for a majority
Party	Leader	Vote %	Seats	+/–
Labour			10	
SDL			5	
This lists parties that won seats. See the complete results below.

The FLP retained control of the Lautoka City Council, winning 10 of the 15 seats. The remaining 5 seats, all from the Waiyavi Ward, were won by the SDL.

=== Ba Town ===
2002 Ba Town Council election
- All 15 seats of the Town Council; 8 seats needed for a majority
Party	Leader	Vote %	Seats	+/–
RA			15	
This lists parties that won seats. See the complete results below.

The NFP-dominated Ratepayers Alliance made a clean sweep, winning all 15 seats on the Ba Town Council.

=== Labasa ===
2002 Labasa Town Council election
- All 12 seats of the Town Council; 6 seats needed for a majority
Party	Leader	Vote %	Seats	+/–
RA			10	
Labour			2	
This lists parties that won seats. See the complete results below.

The Ratepayers Alliance, dominated by the NFP, won 10 of the 12 seats. The remaining 2 were won by the FLP.

=== Savusavu ===
2002 Savusavu Town Council election
- All 9 seats of the Town Council; 5 seats needed for a majority
Party	Leader	Vote %	Seats	+/–
Lighthouse			6	
Sunrise			2	
This lists parties that won seats. See the complete results below.

The election for control of the Savusavu Town Council was fought entirely between locally-organised groups with no ties to national political parties. Of the 9 seats, the Lighthouse won 6 and Sunrise 2.

=== Nasinu ===
2002 Nasinu Town Council election
- All 21 seats of the Town Council; 11 seats needed for a majority
Party	Leader	Vote %	Seats	+/–
SDL			11	
Labour			10	
This lists parties that won seats. See the complete results below.

The SDL narrowly won control of the 21-member Nasinu Town Council, taking 11 seats, against 10 for the FLP.

=== Lami ===
The Ratepayers Association extended its 17-year hold on the Lami Town Council by winning another term.

== Controversies ==
The FLP made allegations of electoral fraud in the Towns of Ba, Labasa, Nadi, and Suva. People living outside the municipal boundaries were allegedly enrolled as voters. According to the FLP, electoral authorities ignored 300 such cases in Labasa. In all municipalities, there were reports of voters finding that their names had not been registered on the final roll, despite appearing on the provisional one; the FLP claimed that a number of these were known supporters of the party.
