= Nagindas =

Nagindas is a given name and surname. Notable people with the name include:

- Nagindas Parekh (1903-1993), Indian writer
- Nagindas Sanghavi (1920–2020), Indian political professor
- Shivlal Nagindas (born 1939), Fijian businessman

== See also ==
- Sheth Chimanlal Nagindas Vidyalaya, school in India
