= Rugby union in Fiji =

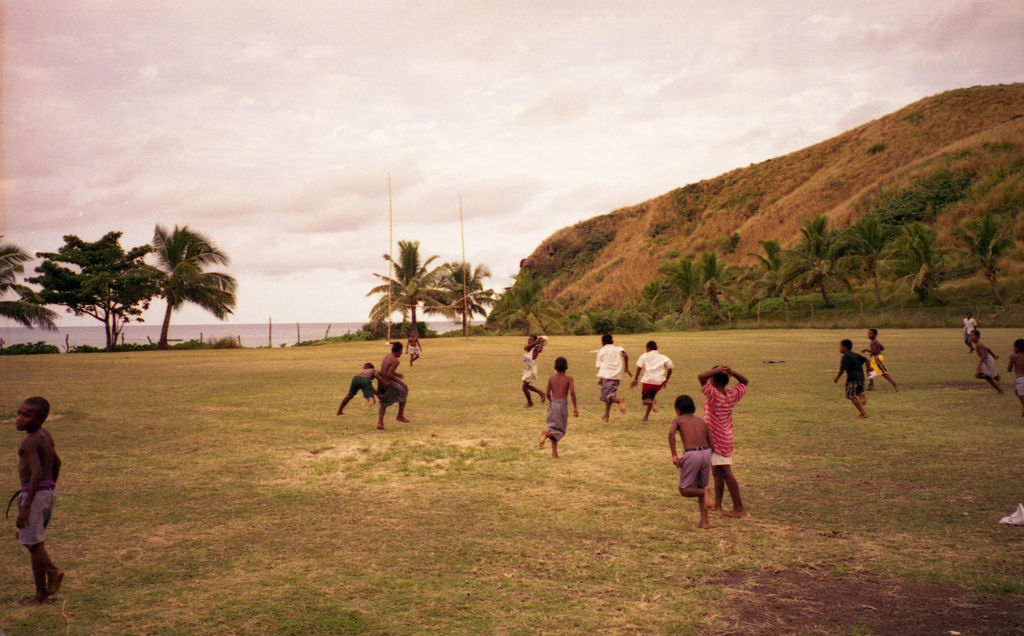
- Children playing rugby in Fiji
- Country: Fiji
- Governing body: Fiji Rugby Union
- National team: Fiji
- First played: 1884
- Registered players: 37,570 (total); 8,770 (adult)
- Clubs: 560

National competitions
- Rugby World Cup; World Rugby Pacific Nations Cup; Rugby Sevens World Cup; HSBC Sevens

Club competitions
- World Rugby Pacific Challenge; Colonial Cup; Skipper Cup

Rugby union is the most popular sport in Fiji. It is considered to be the national sport of the country. The sport was introduced to Fiji in the 1880s. Fiji is defined as a tier two rugby nation by World Rugby. The national team has competed at the Rugby World Cup and made it as far as the quarter-finals. Their sevens team is also noted for their success, winning multiple Olympic gold medals, World Rugby Sevens Series and Rugby World Cup Sevens.

== Governing body ==
Fiji Rugby Union (FRU) is the governing body for the sport. It was founded in 1913, and joined the IRB in 1987. It is divided into over 30 provincial unions. The Fiji Rugby Union is a member of the Pacific Islands Rugby Alliance (PIRA) along with Samoa and Tonga. The FRU was originally established as the Fiji Rugby Football Union, with the change in title coming about in 1963. The FRFU was formed in 1913 as the sport begun to grow. Fiji were awarded 'second tier' status by the International Rugby Board.

By 1976, the union contained 750 clubs.

For a number of years, Fiji rugby suffered from a degree of racial segregation - the Native Rugby Union was formed in 1915, but did not merge with the national union until 1945.

== History ==
=== Early history ===
Rugby football was introduced into Fiji in the 1884 if not earlier, by Britons and New Zealanders, and Fijian soldiers of the Native Constabulary at Ba, on Viti Levu. By the early 1890s, the sport had started to draw attention from media outlets, such as newspaper and other print, and the game started to establish itself as a sport in the country.

In its early years, it faced off strong competition from association football, but by 1904, rugby had won out as the stronger code in Fiji, and remains so today.

At the turn of the twentieth century, a lot of the regular players were expatriates, however, by 1904, a domestic club competition had been organised; in the early years, there were racially segregated leagues with whites and native Fijians playing separately.

The first formally organised club, Pacific, was formed in 1913 by New Zealander PJ Sheehan, a tradesman. The idea to form a rugby club came about from Sheehan and his co-workers, most who were New Zealand or Australian expatriates, and had no organised sporting club or competition. The club was founded with around 40 members.

These matches became popular with the locals, as well as the European population in Fiji. Sheehan was approached by a European to consider the formation of a governing body. Thus, the Fiji Rugby Football Union was soon formed. The Cadets club and the United Services club were also established in this period. Sir Ernest Bickham Sweet-Escott, the governor of the colony at the time, donated the Escott Shield, with the purpose for competitive club competition. The first championship was won by the Pacific club. During this period, Sheehan arranged for the All Blacks to stop in Fiji on their way home from a tour of California in the United States. A match was organised between the All Blacks and a Fijian representative side. The All Blacks won 67 to 3, with Sheehan, the captain-coach getting the only points for the Fijian representative side.

The Fijian team was made up of Europeans, as were most of the clubs at this point, though by now the locals had taken an enthusiastic interest in the game. Several Fijian locals approached Sheehan and asked him to teach the sport to the locals. Sheehan subsequently organised a match between two sides, all made up of local players. The game was played on a rainy afternoon, that, along with different interpretations of the rules, made the game difficult. By the following year, locals had formulated their own competition, and the clubs Taipou, Tarirere, Hill and Ofisa (police) had been established. Local businessman J Davies presented the Davies Cup for competition in 1915, which was first won by Tarirere. A governing body for the competition was established through the main Rugby union.

On 18 August 1924, the national team played their first ever test, playing Western Samoa. The match was played in Samoa at 7 in the morning, so the Fijians could later continue onto Tonga that same day, as well, so the Samoans could work after the game. Fiji won the match 6 to nil, and continued on to a nine match tour of Tonga. The team actually wore black jerseys, as opposed to their now-traditional white ones. Spectators at their first game praised the visiting Fijians for their speed and agility.

In 1926, two overseas sides visited Fiji, being the Auckland University College and the national team of Tonga. This became the first time that the national side of Fiji would wear their now traditional white jerseys and black shorts. Two years later, a domestic schools competition was started.

The Māori toured Fiji in 1938.

It was in 1939 that Fiji Schools Union was established to govern school rugby. Also that year, Fiji embarked on a tour of New Zealand. The team became famous for becoming the first side to leave New Zealand without losing a match - winning seven and drawing one of their eight fixtures. The Fijians impressed the New Zealand crowds with their unpredictable and free-flowing style of rugby. After their final match against the New Zealand Maori, a newspaper wrote that "Fiji is destined to play a big part in world rugby".

=== 1950s and 60s ===
Fiji toured New Zealand again in 1951, and were successful with most of their fixtures, winning eight of their games, losing five and drawing twice.

As early as the 1950s, the Fijians toured Australia twice. The 1952 tour was notable for its record crowds in Australia: in the 1952 game at the Sydney Cricket Ground, a crowd of 42,000 turned up to watch. Fiji held the Wallabies to a one-a-piece drawn two-test series.

The Farebrother-Sullivan Trophy, started in 1961 was for competition between Fijian sub-unions.

Fiji returned two years later, achieving the same test series result, and breaking further crowd records. In 1963 the Fiji Rugby Football Union became the Fiji Rugby Union (FRU).

Fiji's first tour to Europe came in 1964. and they played Wales and France and a variety of local teams. Their first match in Europe was against France in Paris, where they lost 21 to 3. They went on to play another five matches against various French teams. They then played a test against Wales XV at Cardiff Arms Park, where they lost only 28 to 22. Fiji then continued on to play another three Welsh sides.

=== 1970s, 80s and 90s ===
The Hong Kong Sevens tournament for rugby sevens was introduced in 1976 and the Fiji sevens team won the title in its second year of competition, in 1977. Fiji went on to win in 1978 and again in 1980 as well as the 1984 tournament. Fiji won the tournament another five times during the 1990s making themselves one of the most dominant sevens sides in the world. However, some commentators have blamed Fijians' love of rugby sevens as being to the detriment of the XV-a-side game.

Despite its isolation and small population, Fiji has regularly punched above its weight, and threatened to challenge the "Big Eight" - one of the most recent examples of this was in the 2007 Rugby World Cup. From 1982 through to 1984, Fiji completed a 15 match winning streak. The national side were invited by the International Rugby Football Board to participate in the inaugural Rugby World Cup in 1987 that was to be hosted by Australia and New Zealand. In their first World Cup match, Fiji defeated Argentina 28 to 9 in Hamilton. They were subsequently defeated by the All Blacks, 74 to 13, and Italy, 18 to 15, but they still finished second in their group, which allowed them to go through to the quarter-finals where they lost to France, 16 to 31.

However, they have often been challenged by their South Pacific neighbours, Tonga and Samoa, who are the other two parts of the Pacific Championship. In the 1987 Rugby World Cup, which was invitation only, Tonga and Fiji were invited, with Fiji making it to the quarter-finals where they lost to France, which ended their World Cup campaign. In the 1991 Rugby World Cup, they lost all three of their games, and they did not even qualify for the 1995 tournament. However, the Fiji sevens team won the Rugby World Cup Sevens three years later. Fiji found itself increasingly excluded from the Tri-Nation group - Australia, New Zealand and South Africa - which denied them entry to the Super 12, and hindered development of the game internationally.

Professionalisation was a mixed blessing for the Fijian game. On the one hand, it meant that the Fiji team could call on professional talent, and on the other, it meant a "brawn drain", as players such as Serevi, Rosari, Bale and Vidiri were drawn out of Fiji, and into the leagues of Japan and New Zealand, which diminished the domestic competition.

Fiji qualified for the 1999 Rugby World Cup in Wales and were grouped in pool C. After strong pool victories over Namibia and Canada, they lost their last game against France. Their pool wins saw them finish second in their pool behind France, and move through to the finals. They lost to England at Twickenham, 45 to 24. Political unrest in Fiji during 2000 forced the FRU to accept the cost of hosting international meets in Samoa, instead of Fiji.

=== Present day ===
Fiji qualified for the 2003 Rugby World Cup in Australia and were grouped in pool B. They lost their opening match to France 61 to 18, won a subsequent close game over the United States 19 to 18, defeated Japan but lost their last pool game to Scotland by two points. They finished third in their pool, which did not take them to the finals.

In the 2007 Rugby World Cup Fiji were grouped in pool B with Australia, Wales, Japan and Canada. In their final group game they beat Wales 38-34 and went through to the next round, sending Wales home. They were beaten by eventual champions South Africa in the knockout stage.

There are over 600 clubs in Fiji.

=== Notable players ===
Some notable Fijian players include -

- Waisale Serevi, a mercurial fly-half.
- Mesake Rasari, a giant second rower.
- Paula Bale
- Joeli Vidiri

Two Fijian players were chosen for the President's Overseas XV squad, selected to play England at the anniversary of the English Rugby Football Union:

- Jona Qoro
- George Barley

== Competition ==
Skipper Cup

This is the top tier domestic competition in Fiji. Involves 8 semi-professional clubs from around Fiji including: Suva, Nadroga, Naitasiri, and Namosi. Another competition that runs parallel to this competition is prestigious Farebrother-Sullivan Trophy, one of Fiji's oldest competition and garners national interest. The Players are picked from this competition for representative honors to the Fiji Warriors and then to higher honors with the Fijian Drua, Fiji's only professional club playing in the Super Rugby as well as being selected for Flying Fijians.

=== Colonial Cup - defunct ===
The Colonial Cup was introduced by the Fiji Rugby Union to identify and prepare local players for the international stage. The national side and 'A' team were selected from Colonial Cup players, as well as including overseas players. In 2007 a new team entered the competition leading to six teams in the competition.

=== Pacific Rugby Cup ===
The IRB Pacific Rugby Cup started in 2006 and involves representative teams from the three Pacific rugby unions, Fiji along with Samoa and Tonga. Fiji has two sides in the tournament, the Fiji Warriors and the Fiji Barbarians. The aim of the tournament is to improve the quality of rugby in the Pacific Islands.

== Representative teams ==
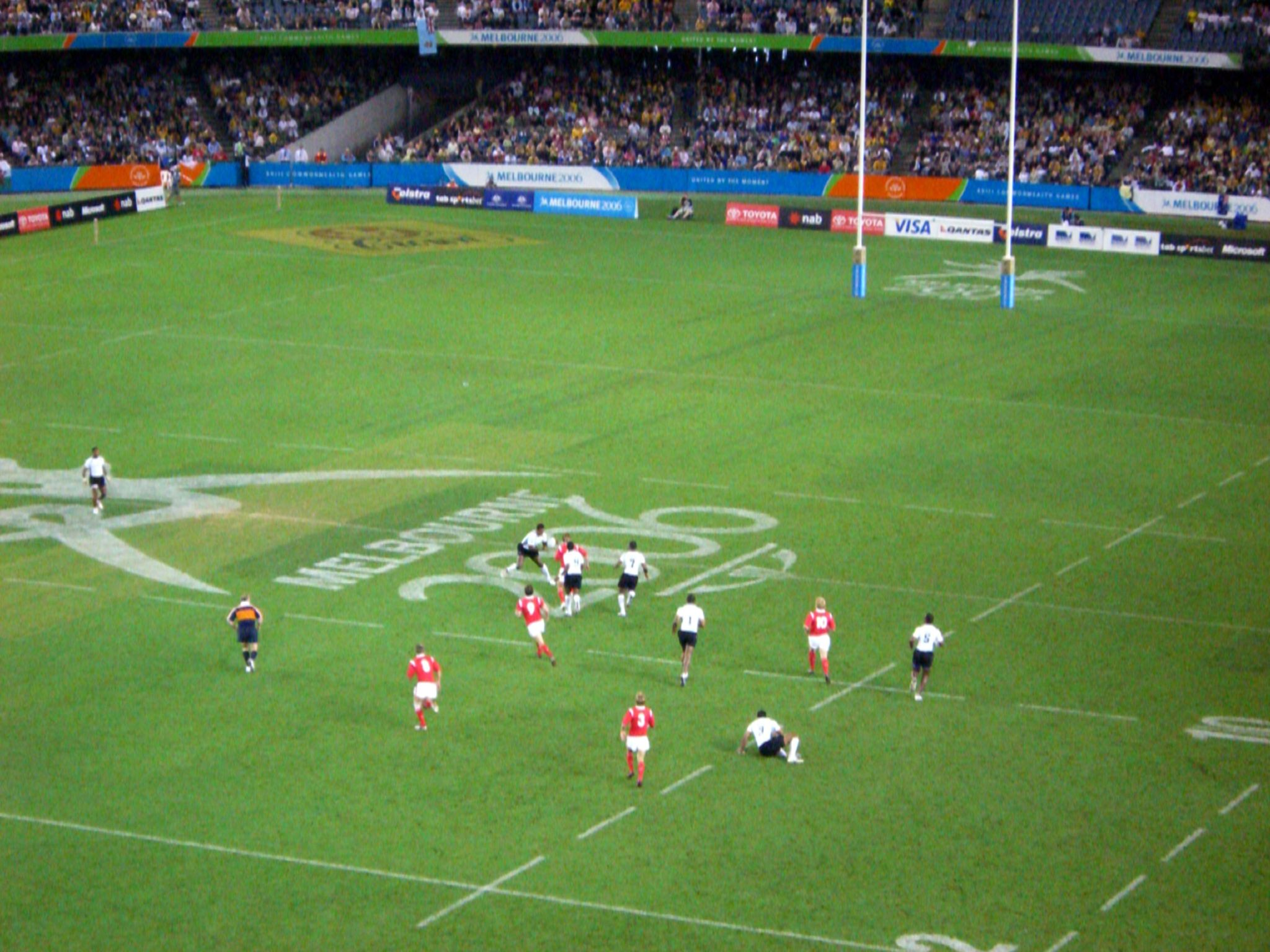
The Fiji sevens team at the 2006 Commonwealth Games in Melbourne.

=== National ===
Fiji have competed at seven World Cups since the tournament was first held in 1987. They made the quarter-finals in 1987, 1999, and in 2023. Fiji also compete in the Pacific Tri-Nations alongside Samoa and Tonga. Fiji also participate in the IRB Pacific 5 Nations, again with Samoa and Tonga, as well as Japan and the Junior All Blacks. Fiji perform the cibi as part of their pre-match traditional. The Fiji kit is made up of white jerseys with black shorts. Fiji also participate in the Pacific Tri-Nations series between Tonga, Fiji and Samoa which has been played since 1982. The Pacific Nations Cup is a competition which involves Fiji, Samoa, Tonga as well as the Junior All Blacks and the Japan and Australia A.

=== National (sevens) ===
Fiji are one of the most successful sevens nations. They won the Hong Kong Sevens tournament in 1977, and have since won it another eight times. They are also the only side to have won the Rugby World Cup Sevens on two occasions; in 1997 (defeating South Africa in the final) and in 2005 (defeating New Zealand in the final). The World Sevens Series was introduced in 2000, and New Zealand won the first six series in a row. However, at the 2006 event, Fiji put an end to their winning streak, becoming the 2006 World Sevens Series champions. They also won a gold medal at the Rio Olympics in 2016, the first Olympic medal in the country's history, when they defeated Great Britain in the final.

== See also ==
- Sport in Fiji
- Sukuna Bowl
- Colonial Cup
- Digicel Cup
- Rugby union in Rotuma
