= Romanu Tikotikoca =

Fijian police officer

Romanu Tikotikoca is a Fijian police officer and diplomat, who served as acting Commissioner of Police from December 2006 to July 2007, and Fiji's High Commissioner to Papua New Guinea from 2012 to 2015.

Tikotikoca hails from the island of Taveuni, in Cakaudrove Province. He joined the police force in 1968. Senior positions held by Tikotikoca include Divisional Police Commander, Head of Special Branch unit, and Assistant Police Commissioner, Crime. He later participated in peacekeeping duties under the RAMSI operation in the Solomon Islands in 2005, before becoming head of security at Goldridge Mining Limited in the Solomons in December that year. Following the 2006 Fijian coup d'état he was named as Commissioner of Police by the military regime of Frank Bainimarama. Tikotikoca was chosen to replace Andrew Hughes, with whom the Military had fallen out before the coup. Before Tikotikoca could take up his duties, Jimi Koroi was appointed Acting Commissioner in a temporary capacity.

As police commissioner, Tikotikoca established an unarmed National Operations Support Unit to replace the armed Tactical Response Unit disbanded by the military. He also ended a sedition investigation into dictator Frank Bainimarama. He also clashed with the Fiji Independent Commission Against Corruption when it laid charges for a murder and carried out raids without informing police.

In June 2007, the military regime announced that he would be replaced as police commissioner by Esala Teleni. In July 2007 Tikotikoca was sacked before his contract ended.

In August 2012, he was appointed as Fijian High Commissioner to Papua New Guinea. He resigned in March 2015, and was succeeded by Esala Teleni.

He was selected as a candidate for the National Federation Party for the 2018 Fijian general election, but stepped down after an allegation that he had raped a maid while working as high commissioner.

In October 2020, he was awarded the Fiji 50th anniversary of independence medal.
