= 2005 Fijian local elections =

Local elections were held in Fiji on 22 October 2005 to elect the councils of eleven municipalities. In Suva, the elections for the Suva City Council were postponed until 12 November 2005 due to the death of two candidates; the death of a candidate in Lautoka also resulted in the poll postponement in one of the four wards.

The newly elected councils of most municipalities selected their Mayors on or before 28 October. However, Suva and Lautoka selected their Mayors in mid-November after voting was completed. The Mayoralty changed hands in six municipalities, as party political control changed hands in the Councils of Lami, Labasa, Levuka, Savusavu, and Nasinu. In Nadi, the National Federation Party retained power, but decided to replace its Mayor.

== Results by municipality ==
Local as well as national issues featured prominently in the campaign and featured in the results. The results were considered a disappointment for the Soqosoqo Duavata ni Lewenivanua (SDL); their first-ever win in Lami was more than off-set by their defeat in Nasinu, whose population is much larger. The Fiji Labour Party (FLP) retained control of Lautoka and won control of Nasinu and Labasa, but failed to win any seats in Ba, prompting party leader Mahendra Chaudhry to cry foul. Chaudhry said he would challenge the result in the courts, alleging that the decision of the electoral commission to disqualify several FLP candidates on technicalities had resulted in the National Federation Party winning several seats unopposed. The NFP not only retained control of Ba, but also of Nadi and, in coalition with the SDL, of Sigatoka. Locally organized Ratepayers' Associations won in Nausori, Tavua, and Savusavu, while in Levuka, the Balance Party, a purely municipal group, gained control of the Town Council.

=== Ba Town ===
2005 Ba Town Council election
- All 15 seats of the Town Council; 8 seats needed for a majority
Party	Leader	Vote %	Seats	+/–
NFP			14	
Independents			1	
This lists parties that won seats. See the complete results below.
Mayor before	Mayor after
Parveen Bala	Parveen Bala

The NFP won 14 of the 15 seats on the Ba Town Council. The remaining seat was won by an independent candidate. The FLP complained that three of their candidates in the Yalalevu ward had been disqualified on technicalities, allowing the NFP to win those seats by default, and on 24 October, FLP leader Mahendra Chaudhry said that his party would challenge the decision in the courts. On 5 November, the High Court dismissed the challenge. A subsequent electoral petition from the three unnominated FLP candidates was dismissed by the High Court on 13 February 2006. The court rejected the claim that the Returning Officer had been wrong to disqualify the candidates, and ordered the FLP to pay F$1,500 to the Ba Town Council to cover court costs. An earlier report from Fiji Television that Chaudhry and Singh Lawyers had been ordered to pay the court costs was incorrect, and Fiji Television apologized on 15 February.

The new council unanimously reelected Parveen Bala as its Mayor on 28 October. He has held the office for ten years.

=== Labasa ===
2005 Labasa Town Council election
- All 12 seats of the Town Council; 6 seats needed for a majority
Party	Leader	Vote %	Seats	+/–
Labour			10	
RA			2	
This lists parties that won seats. See the complete results below.
Mayor before	Mayor after
Charan Jeath Singh	Pradeep Singh

The FLP won control of the Labasa Town Council for the first time, winning 10 of the 12 seats. The remaining two seats were won by the Ratepayers' Association of the outgoing Mayor, Charan Jeath Singh. The new council chose Pradeep Singh as its new Mayor on 28 October, with Leslie Williams as his deputy.

=== Lami ===
The Ratepayers Association's 20-year domination of the Lami Town Council ended when it secured only one of the 12 seats. The remaining 11 seats were won by the SDL. The new SDL-dominated council chose Tevita Vuatalevu as its next Mayor on 28 October. Jimi Savu was chosen as his deputy.

=== Lautoka ===
2005 Lautoka City Council
- 12 of the 16 seats of the City Council; 8 seats needed for a majority
Party	Leader	Vote %	Seats	+/–
Labour			8	
SDL			4	
This lists parties that won seats. See the complete results below.
Mayor after
Rohit Kumar

The election in Lautoka took place in three of the city's four wards, the voting in the Simla ward having been postponed till 12 November owing to the death of a candidate. The FLP made a clean sweep of the Veitari and Tavakubu wards, winning all four seats in each wards; the 8 seats in total give the FLP majority control of the council, regardless of the result of the special election in Simla. The SDL won the four seats in the Waiyavi ward.

The FLP won all four seats in the Simla ward on 12 November. The first session of the new city council, which was boycotted by the SDL councillors, elected Rohit Kumar unopposed to the Mayoralty, with Jesoni Balewai as his deputy.

=== Levuka ===
2005 Levuka Town Council election
- All 8 seats of the Town Council; 4 seats needed for a majority
Party	Leader	Vote %	Seats	+/–
Balance			6	
SDL			2	
This lists parties that won seats. See the complete results below.
Mayor before	Mayor after
Taniela Bulivou; SDL	George Gibson; Balance

The Balance Party won 6 of the 8 seats on the Levuka Town Council, defeating the SDL of outgoing Mayor Taniela Bulivou, which won the remaining two seats. The new council chose George Gibson as its new Mayor, with Father Taniela Bola as his deputy; both are members of the Balance Party.

=== Nadi ===
2005 Nadi Town Council election
- All 15 seats of the Town Council; 8 seats needed for a majority
Party	Leader	Vote %	Seats	+/–
NFP			10	
Labour			5	
This lists parties that won seats. See the complete results below.
Mayor after
Shalesh Mudliar

The election produced little change from 2002, with the NFP retaining its hold on the Nadi Town Council. The NFP won 10 of the 15 seats, with the remaining 5 seats, all from the Martintar Ward, going to the FLP. This was an exact repeat of the scenario in 2002. Shalesh Mudliar and Timoci Koroiciqica, both of the NFP, were subsequently chosen by the new council to be Mayor and Deputy Mayor respectively.

Defeated FLP candidate Surendra Singh filed a lawsuit on 14 December, seeking to invalidate the results for the Namuka Ward, which he contested. Claiming that the electoral roll failed to comply with the electoral act, he demanded a fresh poll in the Ward.

=== Nasinu ===
2005 Nasinu Town Council election
- All 21 seats of the Town Council; 22 seats needed for a majority
Party	Leader	Vote %	Seats	+/–
Labour			14	
SDL			7	
This lists parties that won seats. See the complete results below.
Mayor before	Mayor after
Joji Taholo; SDL	Rajeshwar Kumar; Labour

The SDL, led by Mayor Joji Taholo since 2000, lost control of the Nasinu Town Council, taking only 7 of the 21 seats. The other 14 seats were all won by the FLP. At a meeting boycotted by the SDL members, the new council elected Rajeshwar Kumar as Mayor and Dhirendra Prasad as his deputy on 28 October. SDL General Secretary Jale Baba said that the party intended to challenge the results in the court.

On 7 November, Baba told the Fiji Village news service that four SDL councillors intended to apply for a court order on 11 November to halt council operations, on the grounds that procedures were not followed in the run-up to the election. Lawyers, he said, had advised the SDL councillors not to participate in any council business. Having missed two sessions already, being absent from a third without leave would automatically forfeit their seats. They were confident, however, that the court would grant a stay to prevent any further meetings, he stated.

=== Nausori ===
2005 Nausori Town Council election
- All 12 seats of the Town Council; 6 seats needed for a majority
Party	Leader	Vote %	Seats	+/–
RA			12	
This lists parties that won seats. See the complete results below.
Mayor after
Vikash Singh

All 12 seats on the Nausori Town Council were all won by the Ratepayers' Association. The new council chose Vikash Singh for the Mayoralty on 28 October.

=== Savusavu ===
2005 Savusavu Town Council election
- All 9 seats of the Town Council; 5 seats needed for a majority
Party	Leader	Vote %	Seats	+/–
SRC			5	
Sunrise			3	
Lighthouse			1	
This lists parties that won seats. See the complete results below.
Mayor before	Mayor after
Peni Naulu; Lighthouse	Ram Pillay; SRC

As in 2002, the election for control of the Savusavu Town Council was fought entirely between locally-organised groups with no ties to national political parties. The result was a defeat for the ruling Lighthouse Party of outgoing Mayor Peni Naulu, which won only one seat on the nine-member Savusavu Town Council. The Savusavu Ratepayers and Citizens Party (SRC) won power, taking five seats, while the Sunrise Party won three. The new council chose Ram Pillay of the SRC as Mayor, with Shiu Shankar Singh of the Sunrise Party as his deputy.

=== Sigatoka ===
2005 Sigatoka Town Council election
- All 10 seats of the Town Council; 5 seats needed for a majority
Party	Leader	Vote %	Seats	+/–
SDL			10 (Note: SDL and the NFP formed a coalition government.)	
NFP			10	
This lists parties that won seats. See the complete results below.
Mayor before	Mayor after
Isikeli Tasere	Isikeli Tasere

All 10 seats on the Sigatoka Town Council were won by an SDL/NFP coalition. The new council reelected Ratu Isikeli Tasere as Mayor on 2 November.

=== Suva ===
2005 Suva City Council election
- All 20 seats of the City Council; 10 seats needed for a majority
Party	Leader	Vote %	Seats	+/–
SDL			12	
NFP			5	
Labour			3	
This lists parties that won seats. See the complete results below.
Lord Mayor before	Lord Mayor after
Peni Volavola; SDL	Peni Volavola; SDL

The death of two candidates prior to polling in October 2005 led to the postponement of the poll till 12 November. The election for the 20-member city council was a three-way contest featuring the SDL, the NFP, and the FLP. The previous municipal election was won by a coalition comprising the SDL and the NFP, but the coalition collapsed in 2004 amid disagreements over who should hold the Mayoralty, and for the first time, both parties contested all 20 seats separately.

The result was a landslide win for the SDL, which won an absolute majority of 12 seats on the council. It won all 5 seats in both the Tamavua and Muanikau wards, and 2 seats in the Samabula ward. The other 3 Samabula seats were won by the FLP. The NFP retained its hold on the Central Ward, winning all 5 seats, but lost ground elsewhere.

Reacting to the results, FLP leader Mahendra Chaudhry said it was clear that the party would have to work hard ahead of the general election scheduled for 2006, to poll well in Suva City. He also announced his party's intention to mount a legal challenge to the results in the Samabula ward, claiming that most of the 42 rejected ballots were valid and would have netted the FLP more seats.

The SDL standard-bearer, Ratu Peni Volavola, was reelected as Lord Mayor at the first meeting of the new council on 17 November. Josefa Gavidi, also of the SDL, was chosen as his deputy after an offer by the SDL to give the Deputy Lord Mayoralty to a member of the NFP was refused by that party.

=== Tavua ===
2005 Tavua Town Council election
- All 9 seats of the Town Council; 5 seats needed for a majority
Party	Leader	Vote %	Seats	+/–
TRALTA			9	
This lists parties that won seats. See the complete results below.
Mayor before	Mayor after
Chandra Singh	Chandra Singh

All 9 seats on the Tavua Town Council were won by the Tavua Ratepayers, Landowners, and Tenants Association. The new council unanimously reelected Chandra Singh, a lawyer who had held the Mayoralty for the past four years, to another year in office.

== Reaction to results ==
SDL General Secretary Jale Baba blamed a rugby match for his party's poor showing in many parts of the country, including the most populous town of Nasinu. "We did not lose to the Fiji Labour party in Nasinu, we gave it away because our supporters were at the match," Baba opined.

Both before and after the results were known, a number of parties had touted the municipal polls as holding significance for the parliamentary election, due in 2006, either by showing particular trends or by indicating the regions in which political parties needed to campaign more effectively. However, Sandra Tarte, a Senior Lecturer in History and Politics at the University of the South Pacific, cautioned against reading too much into the local elections. The mechanics of municipal elections differ from those of parliamentary elections, she said, and voter response would necessarily differ too.
