= Shivlal Nagindas =

Fijian businessman of Indian descent (born 1939)

Shivlal Nagindas (born 1939) is a Fijian businessman of Indian descent, who served in 2006 as President of the Labasa Chamber of Commerce. He has also held political office as a Senator, as a Labasa Town Councillor. The Town Council elected Nagindas, a member of the Fiji Labour Party, Deputy Mayor of Labasa on 30 October 2006.

His father, an immigrant from Mumbai (Bombay), India, arrived in Fiji in 1929 and established a tailoring and upholstery business in Labasa, on the northern island of Vanua Levu. The fifth of four brothers and three sisters, Nagindas left school at the age of 15 to work in the family business because of family hardships, ending his dream of becoming a lawyer. He worked in New Zealand for a six-month period in 1956 before returning to Labasa to work for R.K. Patel and Company. He established his own shoe shop in 1964, with the help of a loan.

Nagindas was elected to the Labasa Town Council in 1983, serving till 1986, and was again elected to this post in October 2005. In addition, he served in the Senate, the upper house of Fiji's Parliament, in 1999 and 2000. He has also been a Justice of the Peace since 1991, and received the Independence Medal in 1995 on the 25th anniversary of Fiji's independence, in recognition of his services to the community.

In the mid-2000s, he campaigned for improved infrastructure in and around Labasa, including a bypass road, a port of entry to boost international trade, and airport upgrades. He also advocated the building of a sports stadium.

== Personal life ==
Nagindas has an adult son and daughter, both of whom live in Auckland, New Zealand.
