= Jimi Koroi =

Fijian Military and Police officer

Lieutenant Colonel Jimi Koroi (~1943 or 1944 - February 2022) was a Fijian Military and Police officer who was appointed acting Commissioner of Police by the military regime following the 2006 Fijian coup d'état.

Koroi was from Nawaikama village on Gau Island. He joined the Fijian police in July 1964, and rose through the ranks to become deputy commissioner in 1988. In 1988 he was involved in a road accident, after which he used a wheelchair. Following the 2006 coup he was appointed acting Commissioner of Police on 6 December 2006, replacing Moses Driver, who had opposed the coup. He was replaced as Commissioner on 9 February 2007 by Romanu Tikotikoca.

In April 2019 he was awarded the Fiji Police Long Service Medal. On 8 October 2020 he was awarded the Fiji 50th anniversary of independence medal.
