= Jeremaia Waqanisau =

Fijian career soldier, civil servant and diplomat

Brigadier-General Jeremaia Waqanisau OF MSD JP (1948 – April 25, 2010) was a Fijian career soldier, civil servant, and diplomat, who had served since April 2004 as his country's Ambassador to China.

== Education and early career ==
Waqanisau was educated in Fiji, Australia, the United Kingdom, and the United States. He held a Certificate in Banking Administration (ABIA) from the ANZ Staff College in Sydney, a Bachelor of Arts in Public Administration and Sociology from the University of the South Pacific in Suva, Fiji, and a Master of Arts in Defence and Security Analysis from Lancaster University in the United Kingdom. He earned a Diploma in Security Studies from the Asia-Pacific Center for Security Studies in Hawaii. He began his banking career with the ANZ in 1968.

== Military career ==
Waqanisau left banking and joined the Army in 1976. His first senior appointment, from November 1984 to April 1986, was as Commanding Officer in the Fiji Battalion with UNIFIL peacekeeping troops in Lebanon. In November 1986 he was promoted to Senior Operations Planning Officer with UNIFIL. He held this post until May 1987, when he was transferred to the Sinai, in Egypt, serving till June 1988.

From August to October 1988, he was the Commanding Officer of the Army Training Group in Fiji. In November that year he was appointed Colonel Adjutant and Quarter-Master General in the Fiji Headquarters, and held this position till January 1991. In February, he was promoted to the rank of Brigadier-General and appointed UNIFIL Chief of Staff. He remained in this position until March 1992. In April 1994, he became Deputy Force Commander of UNIFIL; from February through May 1995, he acted as Force Commander. His last major posting was as Colonel Adjutant and Quarter-Master General in the Fiji Headquarters, from July 1995 through December 1996.

During his military career, Waqanisau also had two assignments as an attachment adviser. The first, in 1990, was as Military Adviser to the Deputy Prime Minister's delegation to Hong Kong, Taiwan, and South Korea. The second, in 1991, was as Adviser to the Ministry of Home Affairs, concerning the review of Fiji's cooperative defence relationship with other Pacific countries.

Waqanisau's first diplomatic postings also came during his military service. From July 1992 to April 1994, he was posted as Counsellor to the Fiji Permanent Representative to the United Nations Mission in New York City. In May 1993 he was Chargé d'Affaires to the UN Mission and then in December of the same year he held the same position at the Fijian Embassy in Washington, D.C. In 1994, the Department of Peacekeeping appointed him as Military Adviser to the United Nations Secretary General's Peace Envoy to Afghanistan.

== Civil service career ==
Waqanisau's 19-year military career came to an end in 1996. He joined the civil service and served as Commissioner of Fiji's Western Division from January 1997 through December 1998. In January 1999, he became Deputy Secretary for Regional Development and Multi-Ethnic Affairs, and in September 2000, was appointed Permanent Secretary for National Reconciliation and Unity, following the Fiji coup of 2000.

In January 2001, he became Permanent Secretary in the Office of the President of Fiji. He was transferred to the post of Permanent Secretary for Home Affairs and Immigration in February 2002, and held this post in 2002 and 2003. In January 2004, Waqanisau was appointed Chief Executive Officer of the Ministry of Home Affairs, Immigration, and Disaster Management. He held this position until April 2004, when he was selected for his final appointment as the Fijian Ambassador to China.

== Awards and decorations ==
Waqanisau received numerous civilian and military honours. He received the Fiji Independence Medal in 1970, when Fiji received its independence from the United Kingdom. The UNIFIL Peace Keeping Medal and the Multinational Force and Observers Medal (in 1978 and 1987, respectively) were for his contributions to peacekeeping in the Middle East.

He received the Fiji Republic Medal in 1988 and of the General Service Medal in 1989; these were followed by the Meritorious Service Decoration (MSD) in 1991. In 1995, he received the Fiji Independence Anniversary Medal, to commemorate 25 years of independence. He was made an Officer of the Order of Fiji (OF)-Military Division in 1997, and a Justice of the Peace (JP) in 2002.

== Personal life ==
Waqanisau was married to Salote Lutu, with whom he had six children.
