= Suva City Council =

Municipal law-making body of Suva, Fiji

The Suva City Council is the municipal law-making body of the city of Suva, Fiji's capital. It consists of 20 Councillors, elected for three-year terms from four multi-member constituencies called wards. Councillors, who are elected by residents, landowners, and representatives of corporations owning or occupying ratable property in Suva, elect a Lord Mayor and Deputy Lord Mayor from among their own members; they serve one-year terms and are eligible for reelection. Since the dismissal of the councillors by the interim military government, the City Council is run by a Special Administrator appointed by the Ministry of Local Government.

== Electoral history ==
Suva has had a somewhat turbulent electoral history. In the 1985 municipal election, the newly founded Labour Party won 8 of the 20 seats on the City Council to become the largest single party, and succeeded in electing Bob Kumar as Lord Mayor in a harbinger of the national election two years later, when an FLP-led coalition ousted the long-time Alliance Party government. The FLP later fell on hard times in the capital, however, and won no seats on the City Council in the municipal election of 1999. At the next municipal elections held in 2002, the Labour Party made significant gains, winning the five seats in the Samabula Ward. The coalition of then-Lord Mayor Chandu Umaria remained intact, however, with Umaria's Ratepayers Alliance (dominated by the National Federation Party) winning 8 seats and its ally, the SDL (the ruling party at the national level), 7. Under a memorandum of understanding, the two parties agreed to hold the Mayoralty for one year each. In 2004, the coalition collapsed, with the 5 FLP councilors teaming up with the SDL to reelect Ratu Peni Volavola, who had replaced Umaria as Lord Mayor the previous year.

Disagreements over the 2002 memorandum of understanding between the SDL and the NFP thwarted attempts to forge an electoral coalition between them for the 2005 municipal elections. The NFP charged that in making a common cause with the FLP in 2004, the SDL breached the agreement, which it said specified that in the third year, the Lord Mayor should be chosen jointly by the two parties. The SDL denied this, general secretary Jale Baba saying that there was no such stipulation in the agreement.

Fiji Electoral Commission Chairman Graeme Leung announced on 19 October 2005 that the Suva City Council election scheduled for 22 October would be postponed until 12 November, owing to the death of two candidates for the Tamavua and Samabula wards, respectively. The original plan was to postpone the poll in those two wards only, but the Commission decided that it would be a "tidier" process to conduct the whole election simultaneously.

The result of the poll was a landslide win for the SDL, which took 12 of the 20 seats. The party swept the Tamavua and Muanikau wards, and won 2 of the 5 seats in the Samabula ward, previously an FLP bastion. The FLP retained 3 of its 5 Samabula seats, while the NFP retained its hold on the Central Ward, but lost ground elsewhere. The new SDL-dominated council reelected Volavola to the Mayoralty on 17 November, and chose Josefa Gavidi as his deputy.

=== By year ===
==== 2002 ====
Party	Votes
RA	8
SDL	7
Labour	5

==== 2006 ====
Party	Votes	Change
SDL	12	▲5
NFP	5	▼3 (Note: Contested as the Ratepayers' Alliance in 2002.)
Labour	3	▼2

==== By ward ====
Ward	SDL seats	NFP seats	FLP seats
Central	0	5	0
Muanikau	5	0	0
Samabula	2	0	3
Tamavua	5	0	0

== Council membership ==
The following Councillors were elected in the municipal elections held on 12 November 2005.

Ward	Councillors	Political party
Central Ward	Chandu K. Umaria	National Federation Party
Central Ward	Deven Magan	National Federation Party
Central Ward	Shashi Dhanji	National Federation Party
Central Ward	Dhani Ram	National Federation Party
Central Ward	Priscilla Singh	National Federation Party
Muanikau	Akuila Bale	Soqosoqo Duavata ni Lewenivanua
Muanikau	Tevita Rawalai	Soqosoqo Duavata ni Lewenivanua
Muanikau	Josefa Gavidi	Soqosoqo Duavata ni Lewenivanua
Muanikau	Temalesi Laveti Weleilakeba	Soqosoqo Duavata ni Lewenivanua
Muanikau	Iniasi Naua	Soqosoqo Duavata ni Lewenivanua
Samabula	Anendra Nand	Fiji Labour Party
Samabula	Silimaibau Rupeni Mavoa	Soqosoqo Duavata ni Lewenivanua
Samabula	Solomone Vosaicake	Soqosoqo Duavata ni Lewenivanua
Samabula	Anwar Khan	Fiji Labour Party
Samabula	Babu Sachida Nand Sharma	Fiji Labour Party
Tamavua	Ratu Peni Volavola	Soqosoqo Duavata ni Lewenivanua
Tamavua	Maciu Cerewale	Soqosoqo Duavata ni Lewenivanua
Tamavua	Panapasa Belena Ceinaturaga	Soqosoqo Duavata ni Lewenivanua
Tamavua	Ruci Gukisuva	Soqosoqo Duavata ni Lewenivanua
Tamavua	Eroni Cakacaka	Soqosoqo Duavata ni Lewenivanua

== Suspension of municipal government ==
In 2009, the Military-backed interim government dismissed all municipal governments throughout Fiji and appointed special administrators to run the urban areas. As of 2015, elected municipal government has not been restored. The special administrator of Suva, along with nearby Nasinu, is Chandu Umaria, a former Lord Mayor of Suva.
