= Fiji Independence Medal =

- Type: Independence Medal
- Awarded for: service in Fiji at independence
- Presented by: Fiji
- Eligibility: Military, civilian and police personnel
- Established: 13 November 1970
- ribbon of medal

The Fiji Independence Medal was authorised by Queen Elizabeth II on the occasion of the granting of independence to Fiji to give recognition to individuals of the Armed Forces, Police Force, Prison Service, Aerodrome Fire Service, Forest Guards who were serving on the 10 October 1970 and members of the Civil Service and other residents of Fiji who have rendered outstanding public service.

== Description ==
- The circular cupro-nickel Fiji Independence Medal features the crowned effigy of Queen Elizabeth II.
- The reverse of the medal depicts the Fiji Shield of Arms and the inscription Fiji Independence 1970 in a half circle above.
- The ribbon has a light blue central part bordered on each side by three equal stripes of white, red, and light blue.

== Recipients ==
- Shivlal Nagindas
- Jeremaia Waqanisau
- Narendra Mangal Singh

== See also ==
- Fijian honours system
