= Vijay Chand =

Fiji Indian politician

Member of House of Representatives (Fiji) Labasa Indian Communal Constituency
- In office 2006–2006
- Preceded by: James Shri Krishna
- Succeeded by: vacant (Parliament dissolved by military coup)

Personal details
- Party: Fiji Labour Party
- Profession: Administrative Officer

Vijay Chand is a Fiji Indian politician who won the Labasa Indian Communal Constituency for the Labour Party in 2006 general election.

Prior to entering politics he was an Information Officer with the Ministry of Information, Fiji.

In 2009, after the military administration of Frank Bainimarama dismissed all city and town councils, Chand was appointed the Administrator of the towns of Labasa and Savusavu on the island of Vanua Levu. He still holds these positions as of 2015.
