= Ioane Naivalurua =

Fijian politician

The Honourable Ioane Naivalurua MP
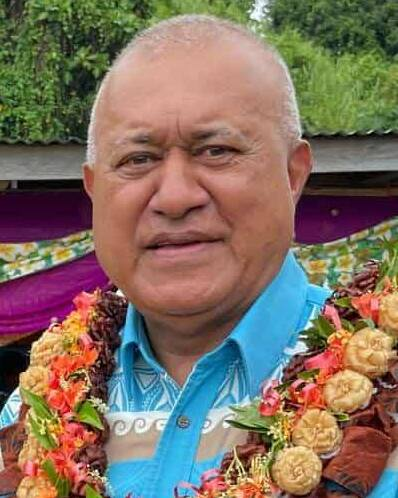
- Naivalurua in 2025

Minister of Police and Communication
- Incumbent
- Assumed office 10 January 2025
- Prime Minister: Sitiveni Rabuka
- Preceded by: Office established

Member of the Parliament of Fiji
- Incumbent
- Assumed office 14 December 2022
- President: Ratu Wiliame Katonivere; Ratu Naiqama Lalabalavu
- Prime Minister: Sitiveni Rabuka

Permanent Secretary Ministry of Foreign Affairs
- In office September 2017 – September 9, 2019
- Minister: Frank Bainimarama
- Preceded by: Robin Nair
- Succeeded by: Yogesh Karan
Diplomatic Posts
Ambassador to the People's Republic of China
In office March 2015 – September 2017
| Preceded by | Esala Teleni |
| Succeeded by | Manasa Tagicakibau |
Ambassador-at-large
In office January 2014 – March 2015
- Prime Minister: Frank Bainimarama

Commissioner of Police
- In office September 17, 2010 – September 2013
- Preceded by: Esala Teleni
- Succeeded by: Bernadus Groenewald

Commissioner of Prisons
- In office December 2006 – September 2010
- Succeeded by: Ifereimi Vasu

Personal details
- Spouse: Kesaia Naivalurua
- Children: 4
- Education: Royal Military Academy at Sandhurst; Australian Defence College

Military service
- Allegiance: Fiji
- Branch/service: Fiji Infantry Regiment
- Years of service: 1977-2014
- Rank: Major General

Major General (Ret.) Ioane Naivalurua (also known as Iowane Naivalurua) is a Fijian Politician, Civil Servant, and Diplomat.

== Early life and education ==
Ioane hails from Naselesele Village on Taveuni Island in the Province of Cakaudrove and grew up in Toorak, Suva. He is married to Kesaia Naivalurua and they have 4 children. He got his secondary and primary education from Marist Brothers School.

== Military, Police and Civil Service career ==
=== Military ===
Ioane enlisted in the Fiji Military Forces in 1977 as a Officer Cadet attending at Royal Military Academy at Sandhurst. He went to the Australian Defense College to attain further education for higher posts as a Military Officer. He rose through the ranks, and has held the positions of Land Force Commander and Deputy Commander of the Republic of Fiji Military Forces. In July 2007 he was promoted from Colonel to Brigadier General. In 2014 he was made a Major General.

=== Police and Corrections ===
Following the 2006 Fijian coup d'état he was appointed Commissioner of Prisons by the military regime. He would be Commissioner of Prisons till 2010. He transformed Fiji's Corrections system, shifting it from the traditional containment idea and toward modern rehabilitation and community integration. In 2010 he was appointed Commissioner of police. In January 2011 he was reappointed as police commissioner for a three-year term. His term expired in September 2013.

=== Civil and Public Service ===
Following a purge of SOE Execs after the 2006 Coup Ioane was made Chairman of the Fiji Post. He is president of Basketball Fiji. In August 2023 he was awarded the FIBA President's Award for 2023.

== Diplomatic service ==
In January 2014 he was appointed ambassador-at-large, and allowed to visit New Zealand, despite official sanctions against members of the military regime. In March 2015 he was appointed ambassador to China, replacing Esala Teleni.

In September 2017 he was appointed permanent secretary of foreign affairs. He resigned as permanent secretary and retired from public service in September 2019.

== Political career ==
=== FijiFirst Fallout ===
In May, 2024 Ioane was one of 17 MP's expelled from the FijiFirst Party for voting in favour of an increase in MP's Salaries, in Violation a Party Directive. A month later, He formed and independent Parliamentarian group with 8 other MP's. Despite being Crossbench (non-affiliated) the group Immediately aligned itself with the Parliamentary Majority. In January 2025, he was sworn in as a Minister alongside Naupoto and Bulitavu

== Electoral History ==
In August 2026 He said he would contest in the 2026-2027 General Elections under the People's Alliance banner. Ioane stood as a FijiFirst candidate in the 2022 Fijian general election, and was elected to the Parliament of Fiji.
