= Savusavu Airport =

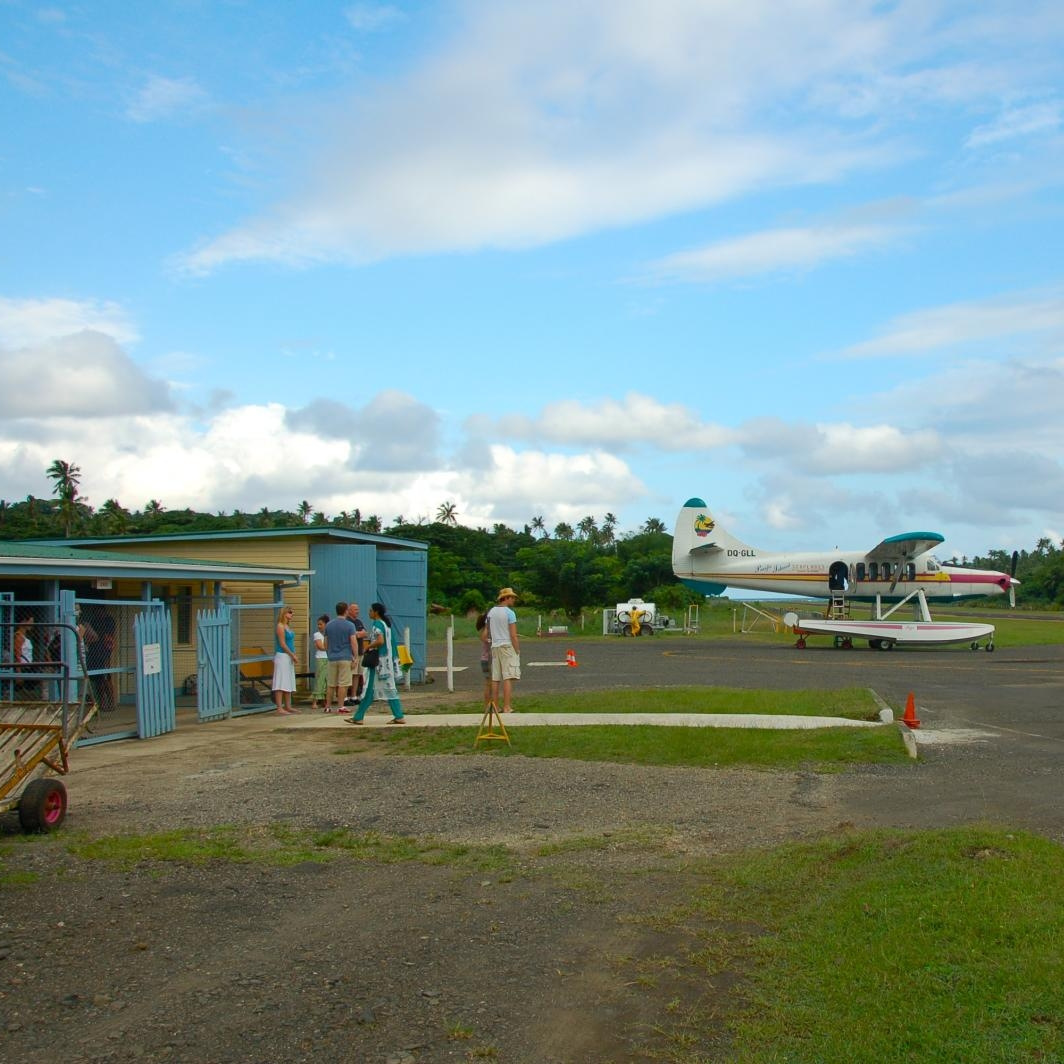
- IATA: SVU; ICAO: NFNS

Summary
- Airport type: Public
- Operator: Airports Fiji Limited
- Location: Savusavu, Vanua Levu, Fiji
- Coordinates: 16°48′10″S 179°20′26″E

Map
- Location of airport in Fiji

Runways
Direction	Length		Surface
Direction	m	ft	Surface
14/32	1,000	3,300

Savusavu Airport (IATA: SVU, ICAO: NFNS) is the fourth largest airport in Fiji, located near Savusavu, a town in the province of Cakaudrove on the island of Vanua Levu in Fiji. It is operated by Airports Fiji Limited.

== Airlines and destinations ==
Savusavu Airport is connected to Nausori International Airport (Suva) by Fiji Link and Northern Air, and to Nadi International Airport by Fiji Link.
