= Orders, decorations, and medals of Fiji =

The Fijian honours system dates from the granting of Dominion status in 1970, when the Fijian Independence Medal was awarded to participants in the Fijian independence celebrations. Prior to two military coups, which deposed Elizabeth II as Queen of Fiji, ending the monarchy of Fiji, Fiji also had use of the British Honours System.

== Republican honours ==
After Fiji was declared a republic, outside the Commonwealth in October 1987, there was no full honours system until 1995. However, in 1988 the Fiji Republic Medal was established with a military and civil division. The medal was awarded for meritorious and faithful service in the military, disciplined services, or civil service. For Fijian civilians, the medal was awarded for outstanding public service to Fiji.

In 1995 with the passage of the Honours and Awards Act, 1995 established the Order of Fiji and a system of civil, military, and awards for the disciplined services. One recipient was Sir Paul Reeves, a former Governor-General of New Zealand, who was awarded this honour for his work in drafting the 1997 Constitution by the then President, Ratu Sir Kamisese Mara. Also made a Companion in 1997 was Satya Nandan. Papua New Guinea Prime Minister Sir Michael Somare was made a Companion during a state visit in 2006.

Ben Ryan, was appointed a Companion of the Order of Fiji for coaching the Fijian Rugby Sevens team, who won a gold medal at the 2016 Summer Olympic Games in Rio de Janeiro, Brazil.

== Order of Fiji ==
The Order of Fiji is the most senior in the Fijian honours system. There are 3 grades plus a Medal, in General and Military division. Recipients of the Order are allowed post-nominal letters. The seniority within the Order are:

- Companion (CF)
- Officer (OF)
- Member (MF)
- Medal (MOF)

== Other honours ==
The College of Honour oversees the recommendations for the Order of Fiji as well as nominations for Civilian Bravery Awards, referring them to the President of Fiji for approval. Nominations for awards of the uniformed services and the public service are made by the appropriate government minister and submitted to the President for approval. Some of the other honours of Fiji with their post-nominals are as follows:

Civilian Bravery Awards

- President's Cross (PC)
- President's Medal (PM)
- Bravery Medal (BM)

Fiji Military Forces Awards

- Operational Gallantry Awards:
  - President's War Cross (PWC)
  - Cross of Gallantry (CG)
  - Medal of Gallantry (MG)
  - Battle Commendation
- Operational Leadership Awards:
  - Distinguished Command Cross (DCC)
  - Command Medal (CM)
  - Commendation for Leadership
  - Meritorious Service Decoration (MSD) - For military officers for 15 years service.
  - Meritorious Service Award (MSA) - For members of the military under the rank of warrant officer for 15 years service.
  - Service Decoration (SD) - For officers of the Territorial Force for 15 years service
  - Service Award (SA) - For members of the Territorial Force under the rank of warrant officer for 15 years service.
  - General Service Medal - For active service in the Pacific 1939–45, Malaya 1952–1956, or after 1 June 1978 for a period of not less than 12 months in Lebanon, Sinai with the Multinational Force and Observers, Afghanistan, Kuwait, Zimbabwe with the Commonwealth Supervisory Force, Somalia, Angola, or such other service which may be subsequently approved.

Fiji Police Awards

- Fiji Police Medal (FPM) - Awarded for Bravery, valuable services, or leadership.
- Fiji Police Long Service Medal - Awarded for 18 years of service. Clasps are awarded for an additional 7 years, and then 5 years of service.
- Fiji Overseas Service Medal - A police general service medal. Clasps are worn to show the country of overseas service.
