= Rugby union in Rotuma =

Major sport of Rotuma, Fiji

Rugby union in Rotuma is a major sport. Rotuma is a dependency of Fiji, although one with a distinctive culture and language more related to its neighbours in Tonga and Samoa.

The Fiji Rugby Football Union is the governing body of rugby union in Rotuma.

== History ==
Rugby was introduced to Rotuma at the turn of the 20th century by sailors and New Zealand missionaries.

In 1910, a combined America Universities rugby team comprising mostly players from California, Stanford, and the University of Nevada went on a tour of Australia and New Zealand, as well as Fiji and Rotuma. The underdog American side upset both Rotorua RFC and Auckland RU, which came as a great surprise to the international rugby community.

Rugby Sevens has been a sport in the South Pacific Games since the late 1990s.

== See also ==
- Jono Gibbes (maternal side), a New Zealand rugby union player.
- Graham Dewes, former Fiji rugby union player.
- NRL player John Sutton.
- Gabriel Penjueli
- Maka Kafoa
- Freddy Kafoa
- Chloe Butler
- Rebecca Tavo
- Nigel Simpson
- Rocky Khan
- Ravai Fatiaki, a Fiji rugby union player.
- Sarafu Fatiaki, former NRL player for the Penrith Panthers.
- Lee Roy Atalifo
