= Apolosi Nawai =

Apolosi Nawai (1876–1946), known as the King of Fiji from Nacavacola Navatulevu, was a charismatic Fijian leader who challenged British colonial rule. He was held by the Fijian government.

== Biography ==
Apolosi founded and led the Viti Trading Company in 1915 that first aimed to capture the profits of trading Fijian village produce for its mainly Fijian shareholders. The trading company was seen by the European settlers as a challenge to their influence, and the colonial authorities and courts were encouraged to suppress it. The company's agents quickly assumed the role of village authorities in opposition to the Native Administration and Fijian chiefs.

In 1917, Apolosi was reported to have told supporters:

"I alone am the chief of Fiji: it is the will of God. These other chiefs only work for themselves; they don't spare a thought for you or your welfare."

Six months later, witnesses swore that Apolosi had claimed "I am the enemy of the government, I am the strong man".

That year, 1917, British Governor Bickham Sweet-Escott issued a Confining Order exiling Apolosi to Rotuma. In 1924 Apolosi's first exile came to an end. Shortly afterwards he led a charismatic religious movement promising a New Era and the fall of the British Empire in Viti Levu. In 1930 he was exiled for a second time.

In 1940 Apolosi was allowed to return from exile, but the authorities' fear that he would lead a quasi-religious movement meant that he was exiled again just weeks later, this time to New Zealand. In 1946 he was brought back to Yacata to die.
