= Fiji Police Force =

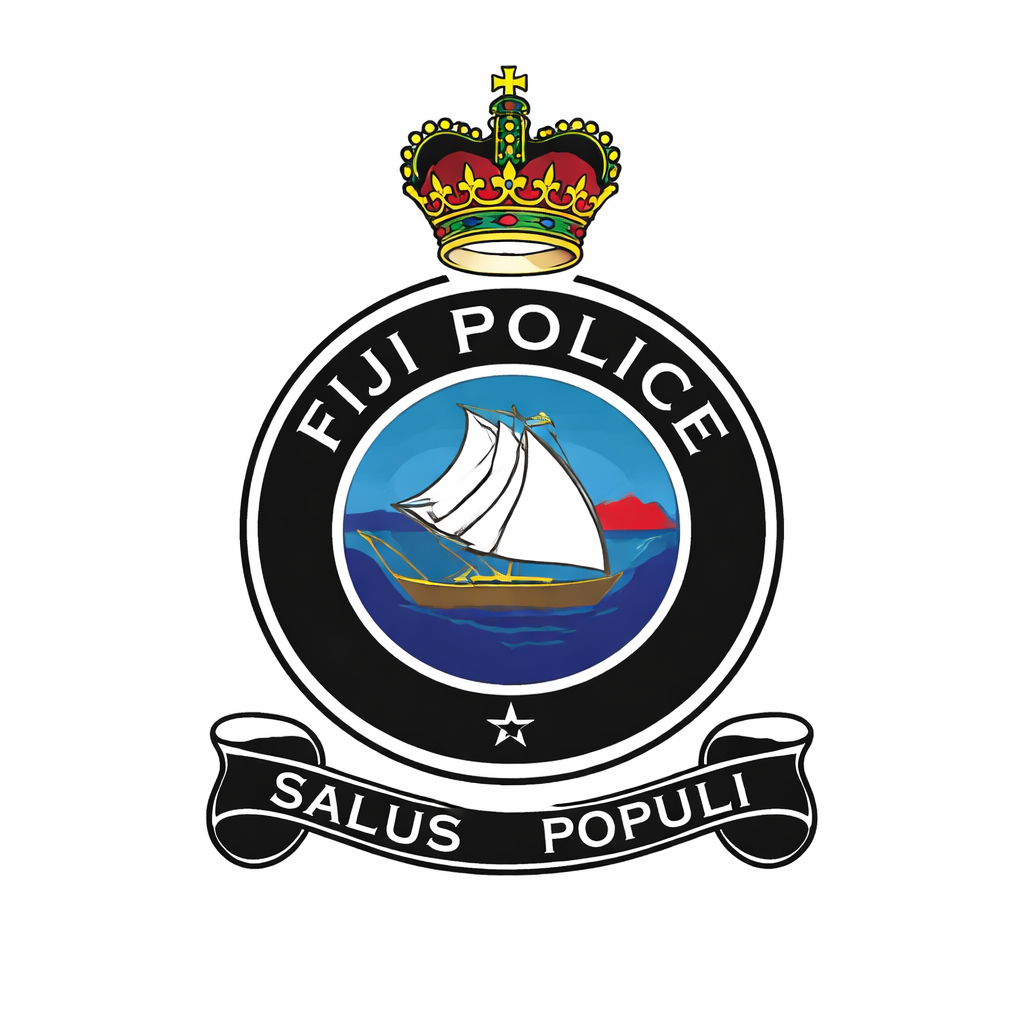
- This Badge Is Used by Every Officer In The FPP

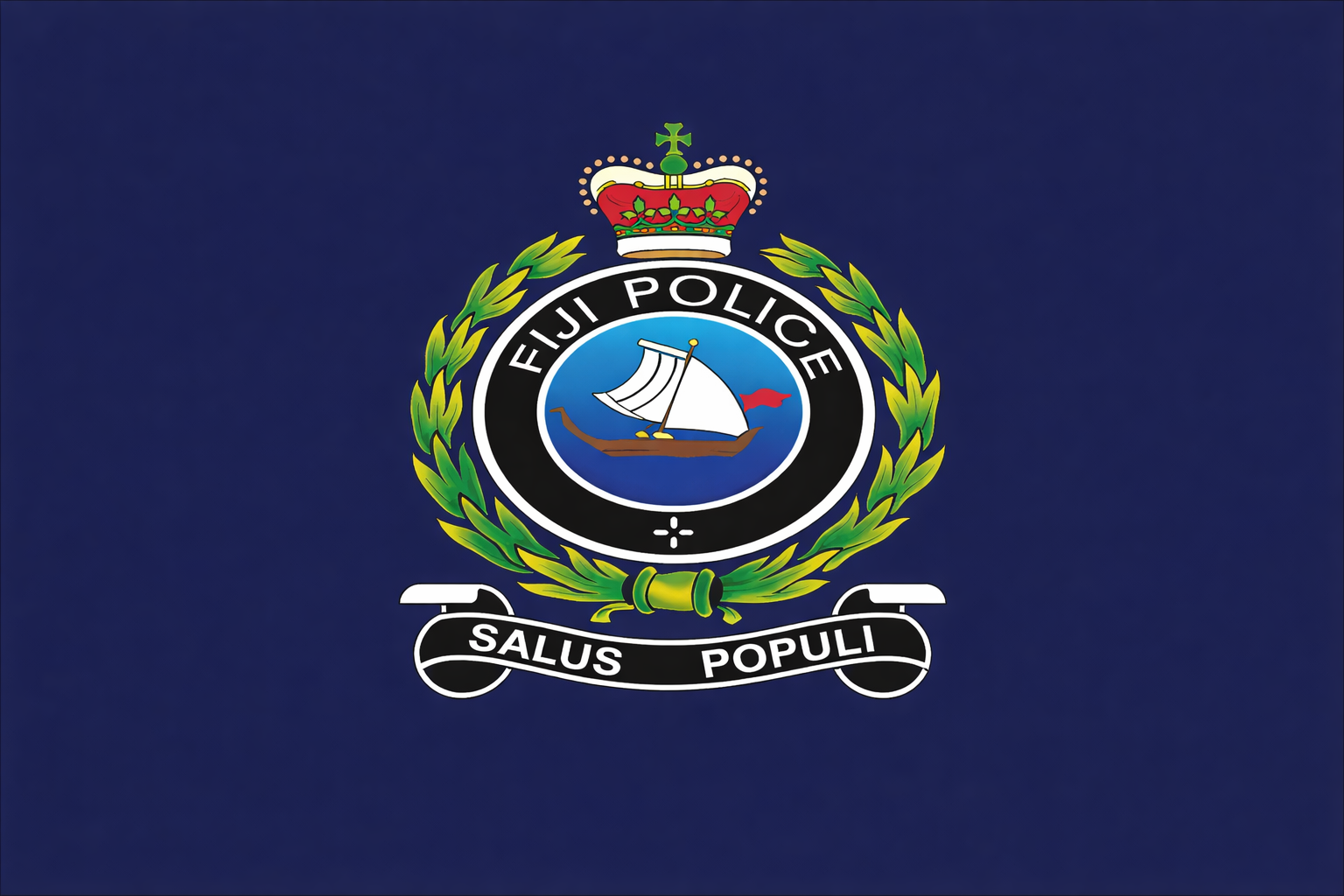
- Flag of the Fiji Police Force
- Abbreviation: FPP
- Motto: "Salus Populi "The Welfare of The People"

Agency overview
- Formed: October 10, 1874. (151 years ago)
- Employees: 6,550 Officers
- Annual budget: FJ$240.3 Million; US$105.9 Million (2025-2026 Fiscal Year)

Jurisdictional structure
- National agency (Operations jurisdiction): Fiji
- Operations jurisdiction: Fiji
- Legal jurisdiction: Fiji
- Governing body: Fiji Government
- Constituting instruments: Police Act of 1965; 2013 Constitution of Fiji
- General nature: Civilian police

Operational structure
- Overseen by Overseen by: Constitutional Offices Commission
- Headquarters: Level 1, Vinod Patel Arcade Building, Ratu Dovi Road, Centrepoint, Laucala Beach, Suva.
- Sworn Officers: 5,456
- Unsworn Officers: 1094
- Elected officer responsible: Ioane Naivalurua, Minister for Policing and Communications
- Agency executive: Rusiate Tudravu, Commissioner of Police
- Services: United Nations peace operations Cyber Crime Unit (CCU); Economic Crime; Specialized Victim Support; Transnational Crime; Crime Scene Investigation
- Districts: Central Division; Southern Division; Western Division; Eastern Division; Northern Division

Facilities
- Stations: 78
- Vehicles: 379
- Motorcycles: 159
- Boats: 33

Fiji has a unified national police force, the Fiji Police Force (FPF), whose motto is Salus Populi meaning "the welfare of the people".

== History ==
=== Armed Native Constabulary (1874 - 1906) ===
The Armed Native Constabulary (ANC) was formed by Governor Arthur Hamilton Gordon when he renamed the Native Regiment to the Armed Native Constabulary to lessen its appearance of being a military force in the aftermath of the Little War. The first officers of this force were appointed by a notice in the Royal Gazette dated on October 10, 1874. The Aide-de-camp (ADC) to the Governor, Royal Marine Lieutenant Henry Olive was appointed to be the Superintendent of the police, despite not having experience in performing or managing policing duties. The ANC was described as a military force, not a Police Force, but it was always commanded by a police officer. There were four different classes of police at that time, which were:

- The ANC, that were known in Fijian as Sotia
- The Regular Police that operated in Levuka and Suva
- The rural police that reported to District Commissioners and
- The village police that were overseen by the Turaga Ni Koro (village headman)

The Armed Native Constabulary was the first government department to move and transfer its headquarters to Suva, after the Governor and his staff left Levuka at midnight on October 30, 1882, and traveled by ship to Suva. The ANC moved into the Suva Police Station. The Armed Native Constabulary was mobilized during the Tuka Rebellions in 1894 by Governor John Bates Thurston to destroy the certain towns in the highlands of Vanua Levu and their religious relics after local villagers began re-engaging with their traditional religion. Tribal Leaders were imprisoned and the villagers were either exiled or forced to amalgamate into government-run communities. The Armed Native Constabulary was reported to be abolished in 1906, but Gravelle indicates that they were mobilized again in 1915 to arrest Apolosi Nawai and his followers, after Apolosi spearheaded the Fijian Tuka resistance by founding Viti Kabani, a co-operative company that would legally monopolize the agricultural sector and boycott European planters.

=== Royal Fiji Police Force (1965 - 1987) ===
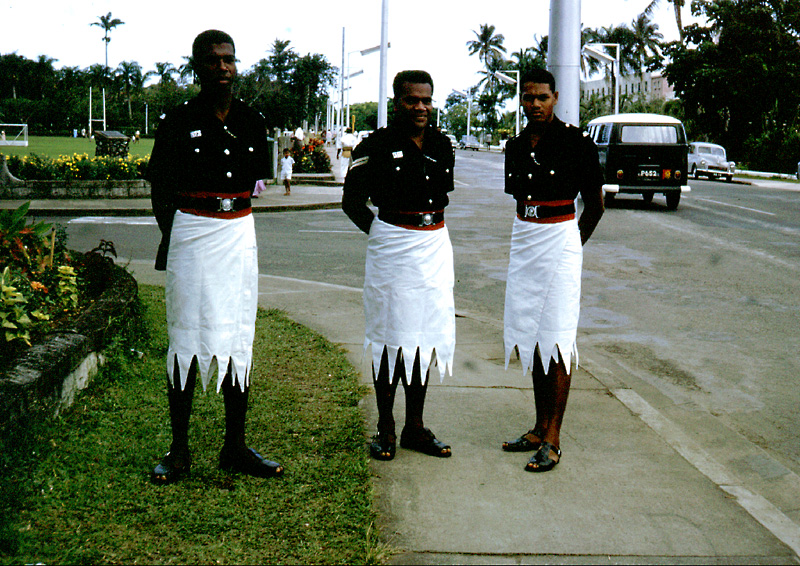
Officers of the Royal Fiji Police Force in Suva (July 1967)

The Police Act of 1965, that was commenced on January 1, 1966, renamed the police force in Fiji to the Royal Fiji Police Force (RFPF). On June 15, 1967, ROY T.M. Henry came from Sarawak to take over as the Commissioner of Police in Fiji, where he served for six years until it became independent. In a report dated as being from 1967, under the heading Recruitment and Training, it was recorded that for the first time that there was a significant increase in the academic achievements of Police recruits. In addition to offering a recruit course, the Fiji Police Academy offered leadership courses for constables, a fingerprinting course, and anti-burglary course were also held. Other island territories, specifically Gilbert Islands (now Kiribati), the New Hebrides (now Vanuatu), the Solomon Islands, and Tonga, sent officers and men to the Fiji Police Academy for police training during 1960s. In the 1960s, the Young Women's Christian Association (YWCA) and the Methodist Church began encouraging the Colonial Government to recognize the status of women, which helped establish the idea of recruiting policewomen in Fiji. In December 1968, the colonial government agreed to organize a program that would recruit women into a police organization known as the Special Constabulary. The government had not explicitly stated what role women would play in the organization; as well as if and when they should be fully integrated into the Fiji Police. In 1968, the first eight women were recruited to form the Special Constabulary, who were:

- Susana Touwa
- Merewalesi Mataika
- Kelera Tokalau
- Menani Vukivuki
- Adi Litia Vuniwaqa
- Nellie Peters
- Kesaia Masivivi
- Annabella Peters

The Special Constabulary continued to serve in that capacity until mid 1970s, after the Government yielded to pressure and decided to admit that women as an integral part of the Police Force. Six Special Constables were selected with seven other individuals to create the first batch of thirteen women recruits to undertake the recruit course to join the RFPF. After Fiji gained its independence from the United Kingdom on October 10, 1970, control over the police was transferred to the Fijian Minister for Home Affairs.

=== Fiji Police Force (1987 - Present) ===
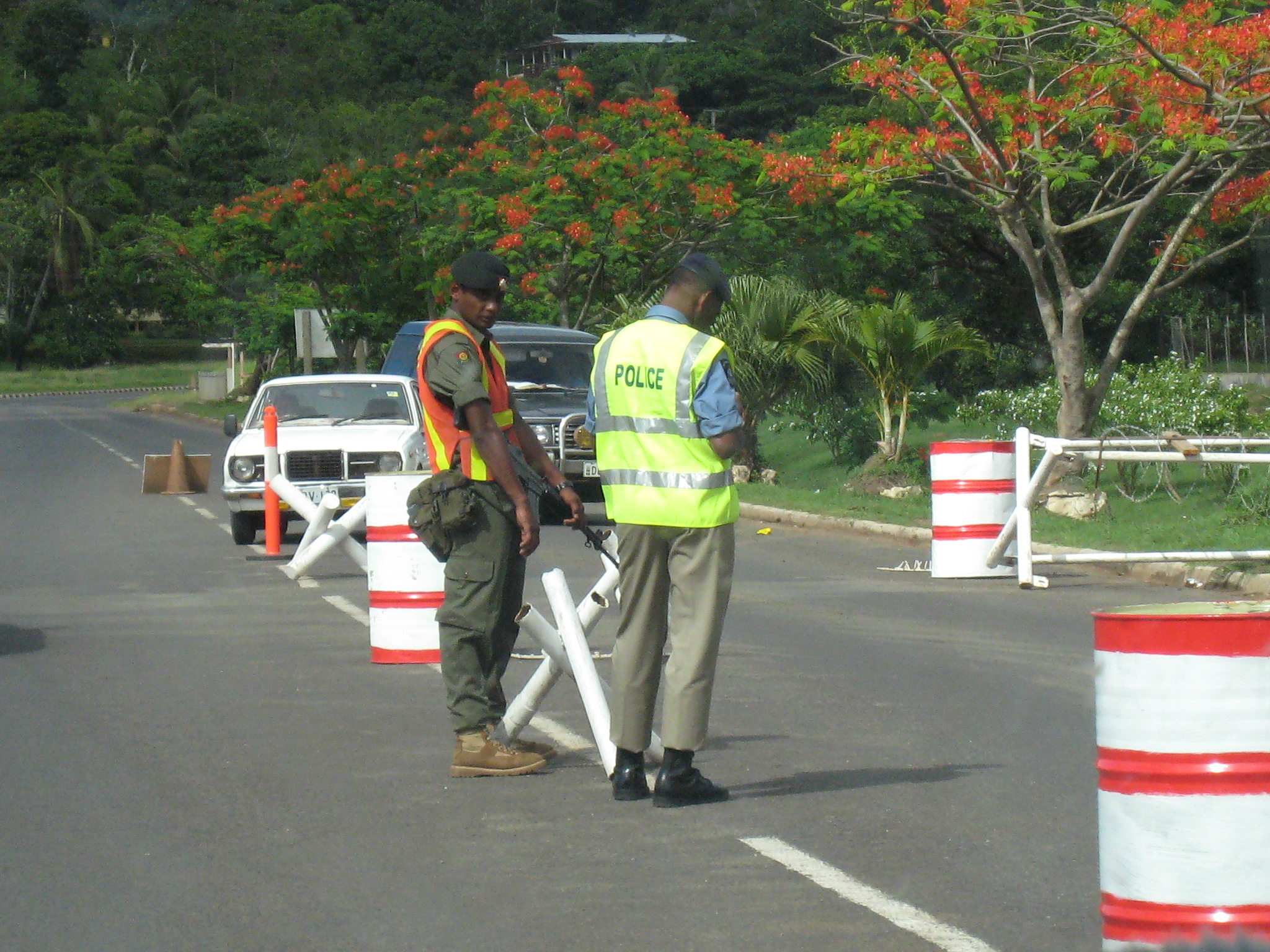
Police and military checkpoint after the 2006 coup d'état

On September 25, 1987, following a prior coup d'état that happened on May 14, 1987, a second coup d'état happened, which both were led by Lieutenant Colonel Sitiveni Rabuka. On October 5 or 6, 1987, Fiji was declared a Republic, which ended the English monarchy's rule of Fiji. The Commonwealth of Nations held a meeting in Vancouver and the heads of the Commonwealth governments moved to expel Fiji from the Commonwealth of Nations. The impact on the police force was that the word royal was removed, leaving it as the Fiji Police Force.

The Fijian Commissioner of Police title had been held by Australian police officer Andrew Hughes since 2003 but after the 2006 takeover of the Government the post has been reserved for a local (Ioane Naivaluru). The current Fijian Commissioner of Police is Rusiate Tudravu.

== Commissioner of the Fiji Police Force ==
The Position was created on October 10,1874, Following Fiji's Session to Great Britain. The Position was first known as the Superintended of Police. Some records indicate that from the late 19th till the early 20th century it was known as the Inspector-General which was common for colony's at the time. The name Commissioner of the Police was adopted When the Police Act of 1965 was passed. The current incumbent Police Commissioner is Mr. Rusiate Tudravu

=== List of Commissioners since 1967 ===
Image	Name	Term Start	Term End
	Robert Thomas Mitchell Henry	June 15, 1967	1973
	Norman A. M. Nichols	1973	1974
	Brian Holloway (Served Briefly)	1974	1975
	Isikia Savua	1993	December, 2003
	Andrew Hughes	2003	December 6, 2006
	Jimi Koroi (Acting)	December 6, 2006	September 30, 2007
	Romanu Tikotikoca	2007	2010
	Iowane Naivalurua	2010	2013
	Bernadus Groenewald	May, 2014	November 10, 2015
	Sitiveni Qiliho	November 10, 2015	January, 2023
	Juki Fong Chew (Acting)	January, 2023	February 3, 2025
	Rusiate Tudravu	February 3, 2025	Present

== Organization ==
=== Executive Structure ===
The "Fiji Police Force Annual Report between August 2020 - July 2021" states that the organization of the FPF consists of the following:

- Commissioner of Police
  - Director of Legal
  - Director of International Relations
  - Director of the Narcotic Bureau
  - Force Chaplain
  - Fiji Police Media Liaison Officer
  - Police Liaison Officer of Defense
- Deputy Commissioner of Police
  - Commander of the Central Division
  - Commander of the Southern Division
  - Commander of the Eastern Division
  - Commander of the Northern Division
  - Commander of the Western Division
  - Police Command and Coordination Centre
- Chief Operations Officer
  - Director of Community Policing
  - Director of Operations
  - Director of Traffic and Transport Control
  - Commanding officer of Police Special Response Unit (PSRU)
- Chief Administration Officer
  - Director of Corporate Services
  - Director of Human Resources Management
  - Director of Training Education
  - Force Psychologist
  - Force Medical Officer
  - Force Accountant
- Chief of Investigation, Intelligence, and Prosecution
  - Director of the Criminal Investigation Department
  - Director of the Intelligence Bureau
  - Director of the Forensic Service
  - Director of Prosecution
- Chief of Planning and Internal Affairs
  - Director of Planning
  - Director of Internal Affairs

The Commissioner is appointed in accordance with the Constitution of Fiji, chapter 7, part 4, section 111. Section 111 establishes the office of Commissioner of Police. This official is appointed by the Constitutional Offices Commission, following consultation with the appropriate Cabinet Minister. The Commissioner of Police holds executive and administrative authority over the entire police force and is answerable only to the Minister in charge. Parliament may, however, make laws regulating the police force.

Fiji has a single local police force, on Rabi Island.

=== Structure ===
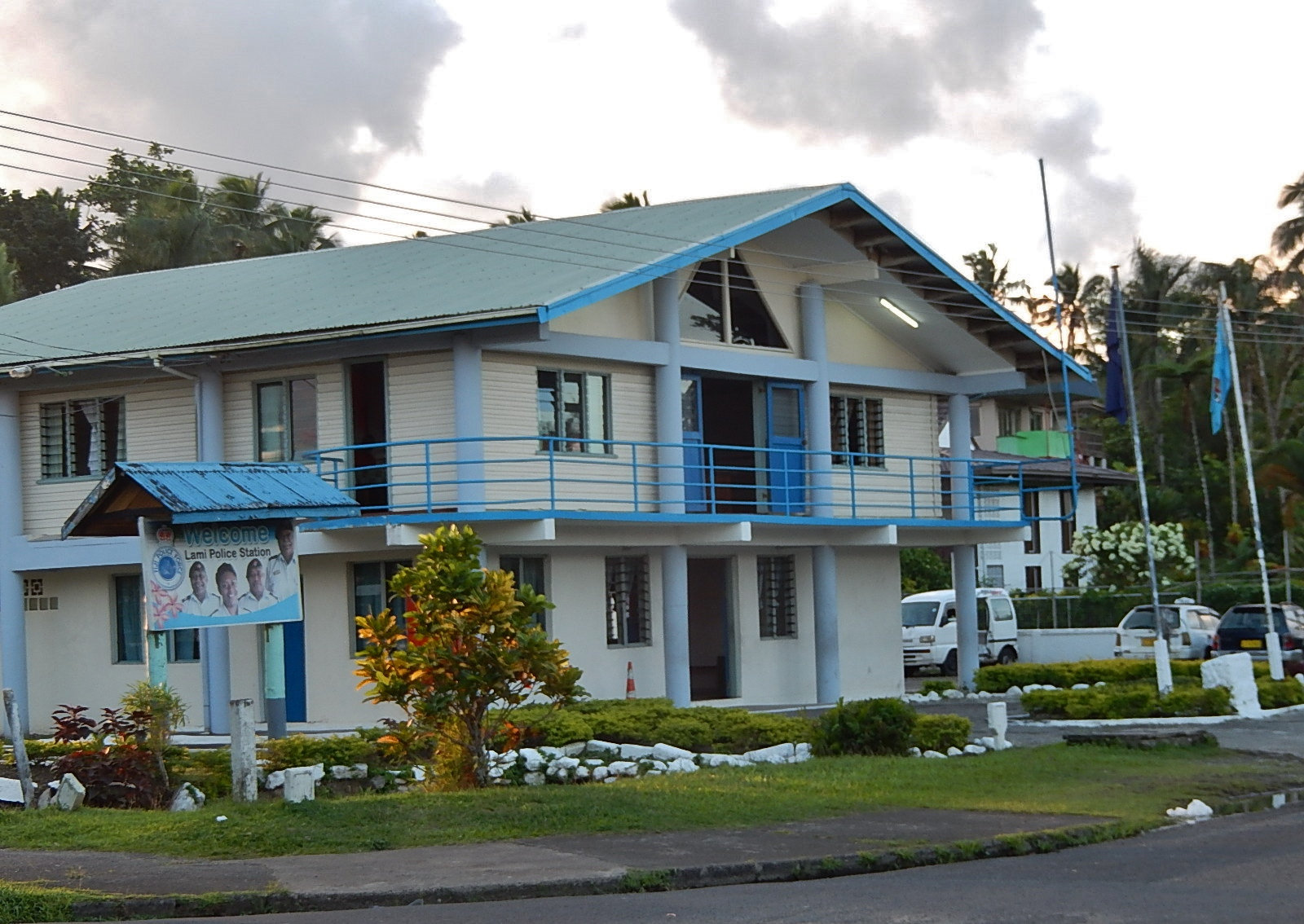
Lami Police Station in 2014

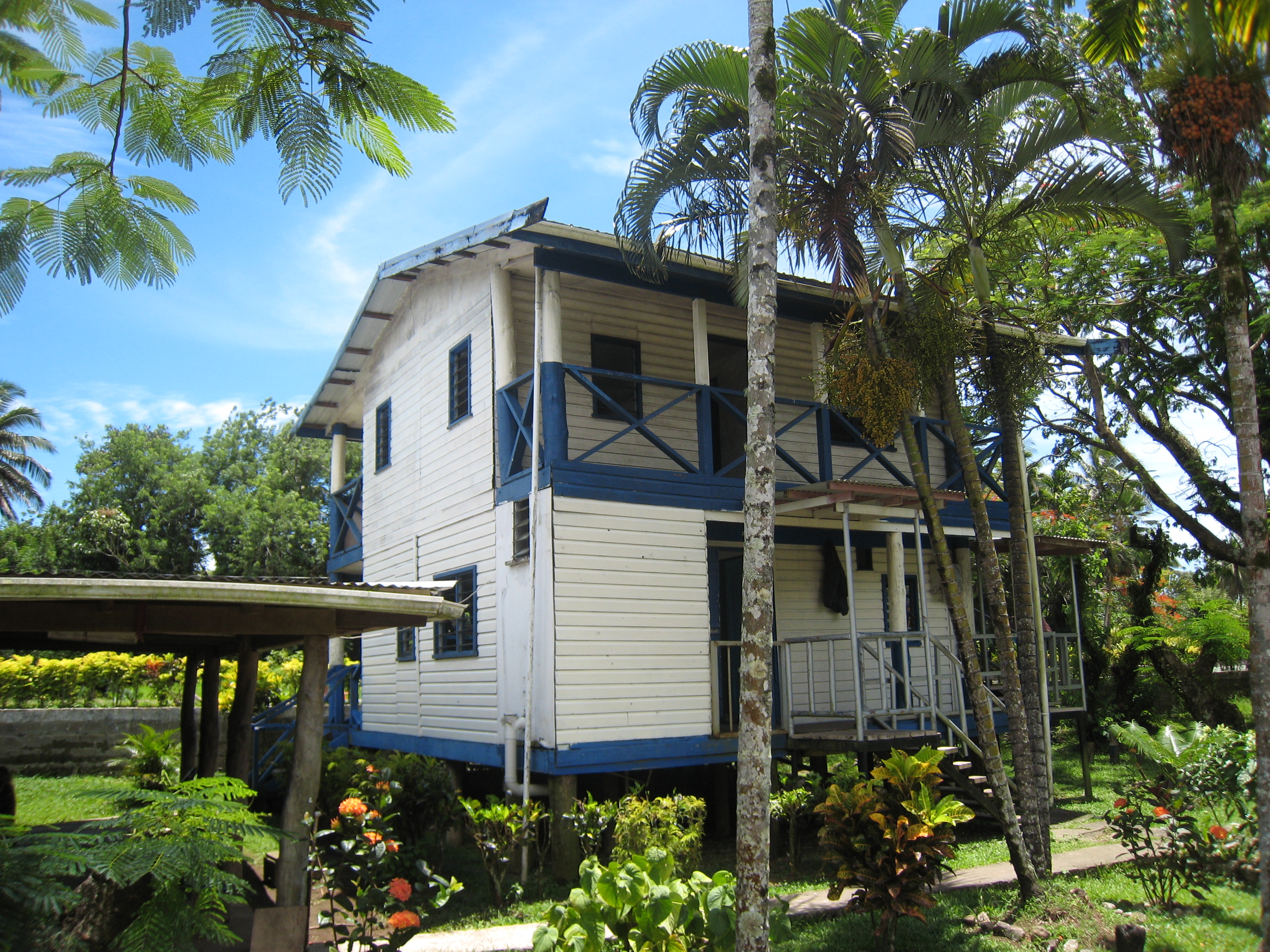
Police Post, Pacific Harbour

The FPF is divided into various squads and units including:

- Humanitarian Emergency Support Unit (HESU)
- National Narcotic Bureau
  - Fusion Center
- Directorate of Human Resource Management (DHRM)
  - Occupational Health and Safety Unit (OHS)
- Civilian Administration Unit
- Psychology Unit
- Fiji Police Academy (FPA)
- Strategic Planning, Statistics, Policy, Research and Development Directorate
  - Crime Statistics Unit
  - Research and Development Unit
  - Planning and Monitoring Unit
- Legal Unit
- Media Cell
  - Divisional Media Alert Groups (DMAG)
- Chaplaincy and Counseling Unit
- Directorate of Corporate Services (DCS)
  - Fixed Assets Inventory Management Cell
  - Building and Maintenance Unit (BMU)
  - Storage and Supply
  - Stationery Unit
  - Tailoring Unit
  - Information Technology Unit (IT)
- Communications Support Unit
- Force Medical Unit
  - POLICE MEDICAL CENTRE (PMC, located in Nasese)
  - Police Health Clinic (located in Nasinu)
- Welfare Scheme Unit
- Office of the Director of Operations
  - Northern Division
  - Western Division
  - Southern Division
- Eastern Division
- Central Division
  - Crime Stoppers Initiative
- Water Police (WATERPOL)
  - Tourist Police Unit (TPU)
  - DOG UNIT (K9)
  - BORDER CONTROL UNIT
  - Police Special Response Unit (PSRU)
    - Dive Team
  - Community Police Directorate (DCOP)
    - National Crime Prevention Board
  - Traffic Control Division (TCD)
  - Force Transport Division
    - Force Garage (located in Nasese)
  - Police Band Unit

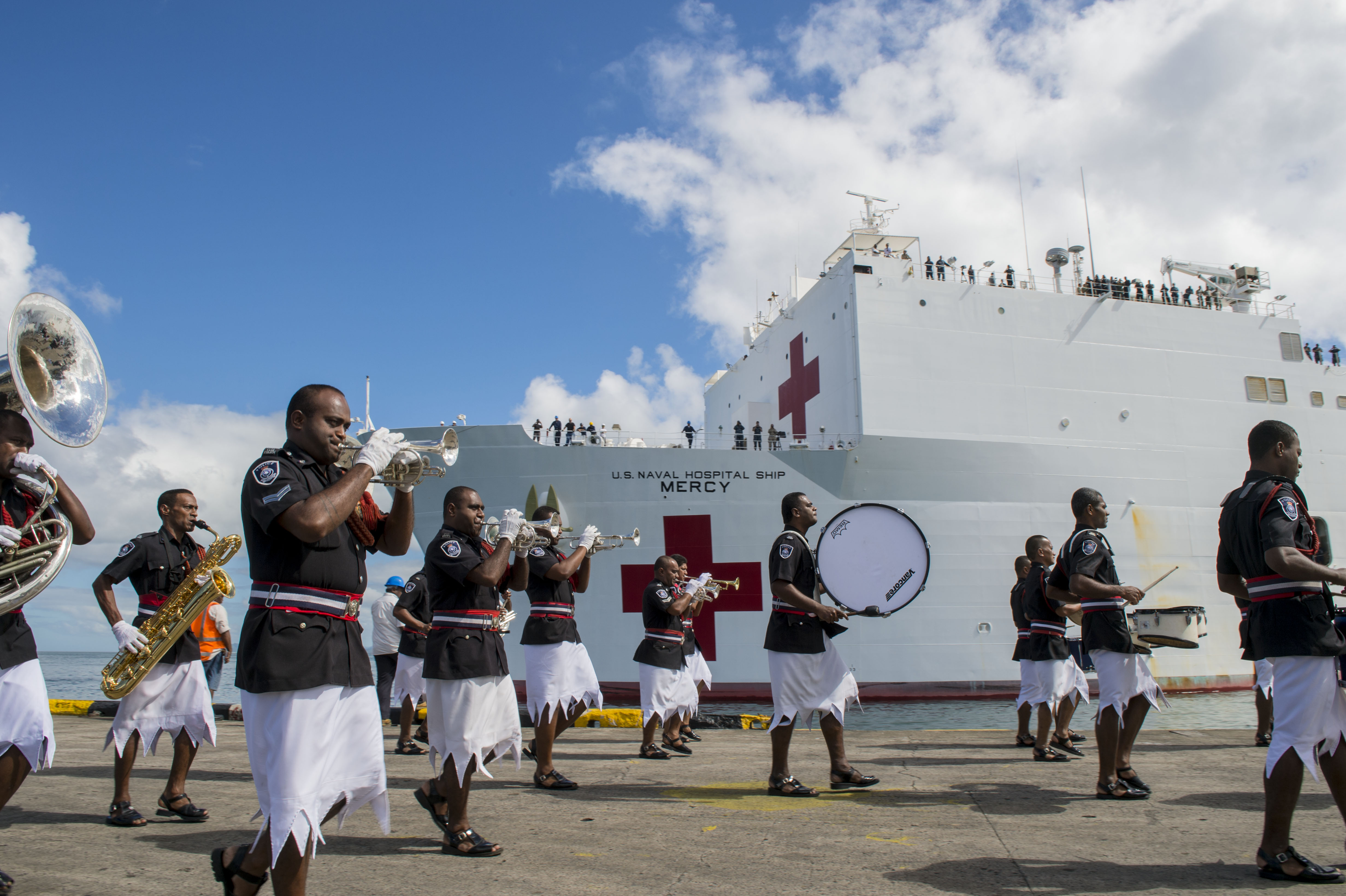
Fiji police band welcome the USNS Mercy in 2015

- Criminal Investigations Department (CID)
  - Economic Crime Unit
    - Major Fraud Unit;
    - Public Sector & Commercial Crime Unit; and
    - Anti–Money Laundering & Proceeds of Crime Unit
  - Major Crime Unit (MCU)
  - Cyber Crime Unit (CCU)
  - Human Trafficking Unit (HTU)
  - Sexual Offence Unit (SOU)
  - Juvenile Bureau (JB)
- Transnational Crime Unit (TCU)
- FORENSIC SCIENCE SERVICEs (FSS)
  - Crime Scene Investigation Unit
    - Crime Scene Office
    - Digital Imaging Lab
    - Fingerprint Office
  - Criminal Records Office
  - Finger Prints Unit
  - Forensic Chemistry Lab
  - Biology and DNA Lab
  - Forensic Pathology Team
- Intelligence Bureau (IB)
- Prosecution Branch

== Ranks ==
Fiji Police ranks and insignia
Rank (unknown-Present)	Commissioner	Deputy commissioner	Assistant commissioner	Senior superintendent	Superintendent	Assistant superintendent		Inspector		Sergeant major	Sergeant	Corporal	Constable
Epaulette insignia													
Rank (1968-unknown)	Commissioner	Deputy commissioner	Assistant commissioner	Senior superintendent	Superintendent	Deputy superintendent	Assistant superintendent	Senior inspector	Inspector	Sergeant major	Sergeant	Corporal	Constable
Epaulette insignia													
Rank (Before 1968)	Commissioner	Deputy commissioner	Assistant commissioner	Senior superintendent	Superintendent	Deputy superintendent	Assistant superintendent	Inspector	Sub inspector	Sergeant major	Sergeant	Corporal	Constable
Epaulette insignia													

== Other Police Forces found in the Southern Pacific Ocean ==
- Vanuatu Police Force
- Samoa Police Service
- Nauru Police Force
- Law enforcement in Kiribati
- Cook Islands Police Service
- Royal Solomon Islands Police Force
- FSM National Police
- Law enforcement in Palau

== Cited Sources ==
- Gravelle, Kim (1983). Fiji's Times: A History of Fiji. Fiji Times.
- Alley, Roderick (2001). "Fiji's Coups of 1987 and 2000: A Comparison" (PDF). Hors Serie. 1. Victoria University of Wellington: 217–234.
- Lal, Brij V. (2010), In the Eye of the Storm Jai Ram Reddy and the Politics of Postcolonial Fiji (PDF), Canberra: Australian National University, ISBN 9781921666520
