= Esala Teleni =

Fijian naval officer (c.1958–2020)

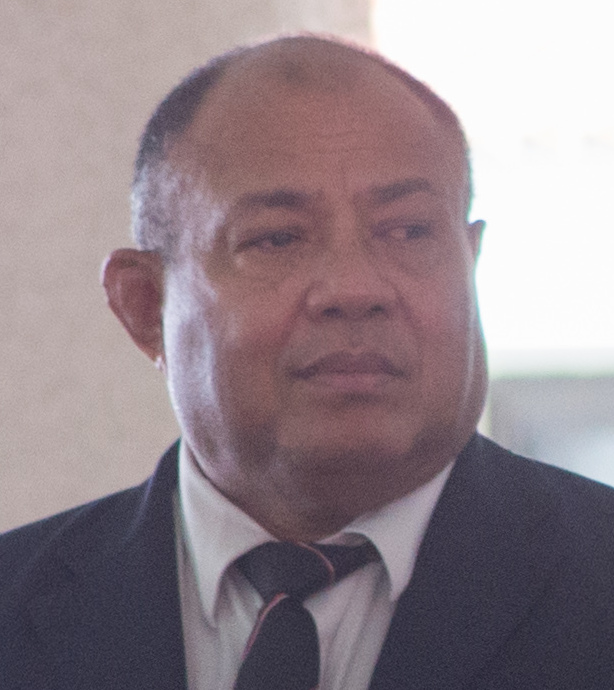
- Esala Teleni in 2017
- Born: Esala Teleni circa 1958 Ogea Levu
- Died: 28 February 2020 (aged 61–62)

Rugby union career
- Position: Number 8
International career
Years	Team	Apps	(Points)
1982-1989	Fiji	23	(32)

Commodore Esala Teleni (c. 1958 – 28 February 2020) was a Fijian naval officer, who served the military-backed interim government as Commissioner of the Fiji Police Force from 1 July 2007 to mid-2010. He then served as Fiji's Ambassador to China until 2014 and the Fijian High Commissioner to Papua New Guinea.

Teleni was regarded as a staunch ally of Frank Bainimarama, who seized power in a military coup on 5 December 2006. Prior to the coup, Teleni played a key role in thwarting a government move to dismiss Bainimarama and install Colonel Meli Saubulinayau, who was regarded as loyal to the government, in his place.

Teleni had been strident in his repeated calls for the government of Prime Minister Laisenia Qarase to resign, and on 1 November 2006 openly flouted government and police directives by ordering the seizure of a shipment of seven tons of ammunition, which Police Commissioner Andrew Hughes had refused to release. On 4 November, the Fiji Times quoted him as issuing a direct challenge to the police, saying in an address to territorial, regular, and reserve troops at a two-week camp at Suva's Queen Elizabeth Barracks in Nabua, that the Military, and not the police, was the country's last bastion of law and order. The same day, the Fiji Village news service quoted him as branding Hughes a liar for saying that the Military had breached procedures and taken the shipment illegally, and on 7 November, he called on Hughes to resign, claiming that Hughes could not be in charge of investigating his own complaint about the shipment seizure.

Teleni hailed from the island of Ogea Levu in the Lau Archipelago.

In 2004, Captain Teleni attended the year-long Defence and Strategic Studies Course at the Australian Centre for Defence and Strategic Studies located at Weston Creek, Canberra.

On 17 February 2009, Commissioner Teleni controversially made comments to senior Indo-Fijian police officers, most of whom were Hindu or Muslim, issuing them with an ultimatum to support his Christian crusade against crime or to leave the force, which caused various organizations and political parties to demand his immediate removal. Interim Prime Minister Bainimarama supported him, however. In mid-2010 he resigned as police commissioner and was appointed as head of Fiji's embassy in China. He was dismissed in November 2014 following allegations of bribery, but was subsequently appointed Special Adviser to the Pacific Islands Development Forum.

Teleni was a Fiji rugby player, captain and coach in the 1980s, playing in the position of number eight.

He is chiefly remembered outside Fiji for a cowardly stamp on Wales’s captain David Pickering’s head during an international between the two nations in May 1986. The stamp caused a potentially fatal bleed on Pickering’s brain. Pickering was unable to play rugby for four months after the assault
