= Savusavu =

Savusavu सावुसावु (Fiji Hindi)
- Town
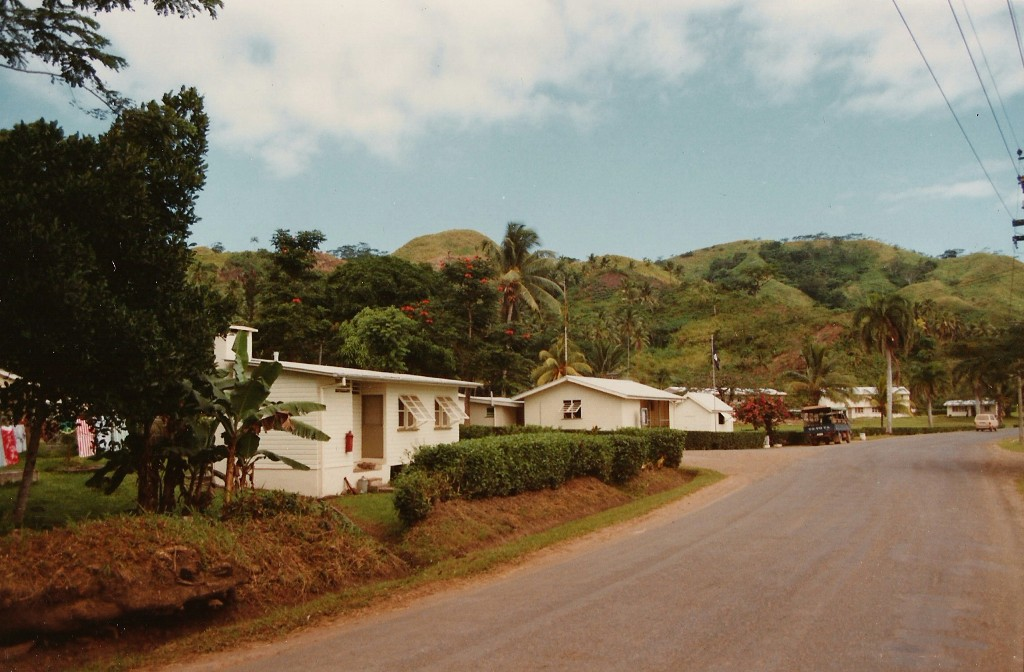
- Savusavu

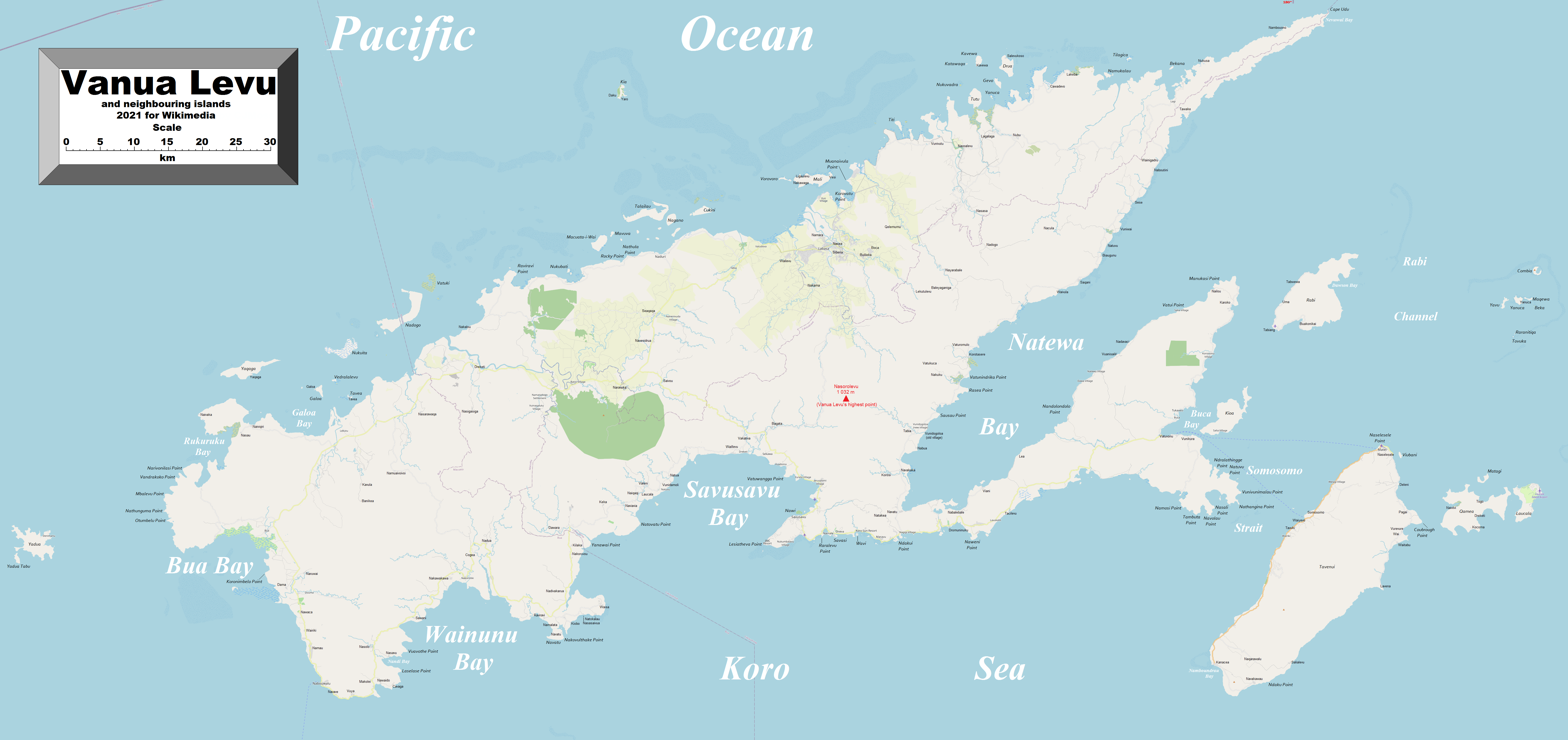
- Vanua Levu with Savusavu in the south

- Location in Fiji
- Coordinates: 16°46′51″S 179°19′59″E
- Country: Fiji
- Island: Vanua Levu
- Division: Northern Division
- Province: Cakaudrove
- District: Savusavu

Population (2017)
  - Total: 5,494
- Time zone: UTC+12
- Location: 84.7km south of Labasa

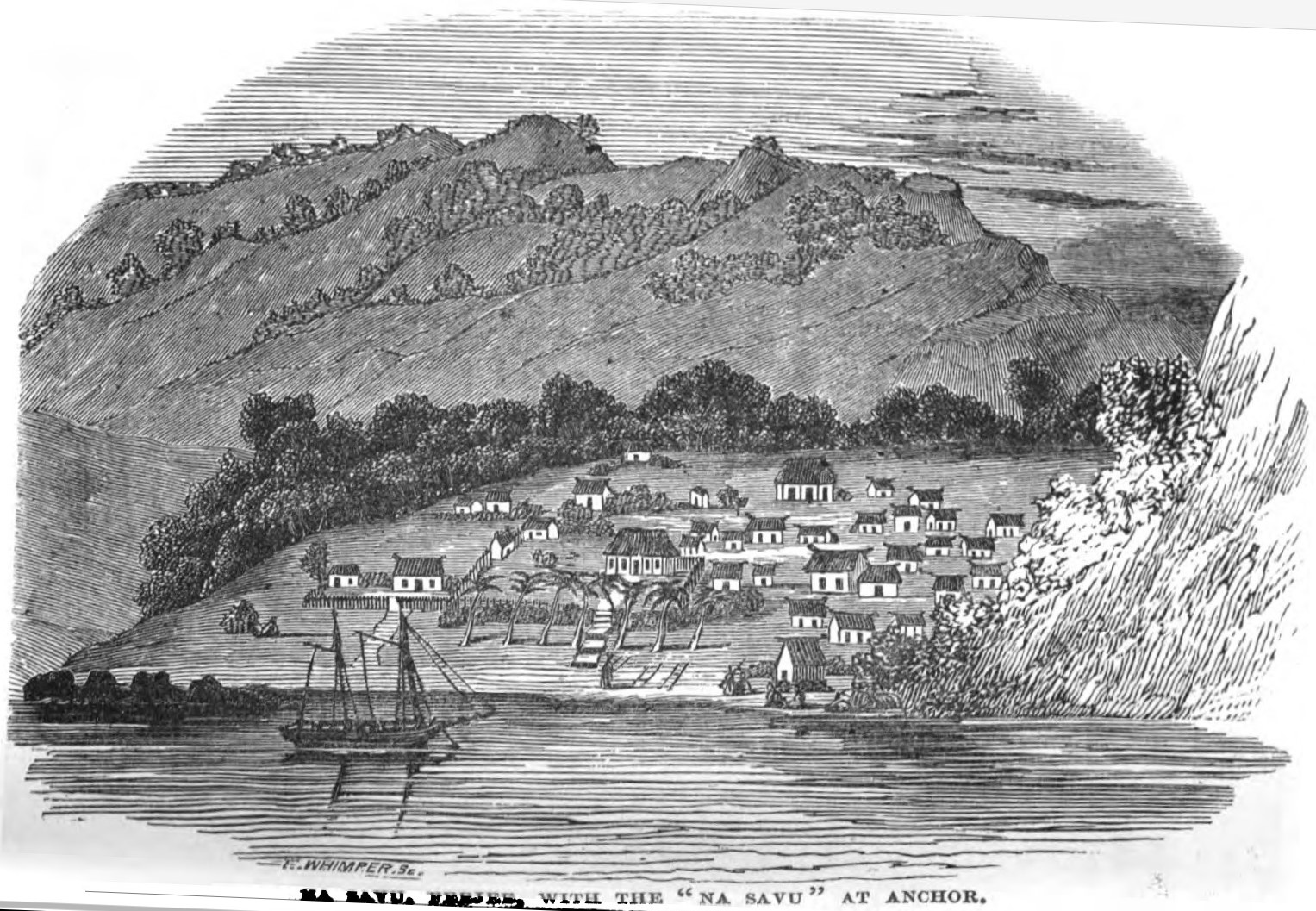
Na Savu, Feejee, with the Na Savu at Anchor (March 1853, X, p.24)

Savusavu (Fijian pronunciation: [saβusaβu]) is a town in the Fijian Province of Cakaudrove. The town is located on the south coast of Vanua Levu Island and had a population of 3,372 in the 2007 census.

Savusavu is known as "the hidden paradise of Fiji."

== Geography ==
Savusavu is located on Fiji's northern island of Vanua Levu. It can be reached by plane from Nadi (one hour) or by ferry from Suva or Lautoka (approx 12-hour trip).

It is famous for its hot springs, located mostly opposite the Hot Springs Hotel – although at low tide the steam from numerous smaller outlets all along the foreshore can be seen. In the late 19th century, these hot springs turned into 12 – 18 m tall geysers for a period of two months.

The old Copra Shed Marina, built in the 19th century, is a major landmark in Savusavu. Renovated in recent years by geologist and Savusavu resident Geoff Taylor, it now houses the Savusavu Yacht Club. Fiji Air offices, Pacific Sun reservations (formerly Sunflower Air) offices, a chandlery shop, a geologist's office, a gift shop, a travel agency and two rental apartments. There are also moorings for yachts, along with shower and toilet facilities.

Another significant landmark is the Savarekareka Mission, 10 kilometres north of Savusavu. The chapel, the first Roman Catholic mission on Vanua Levu, was built around 1870 and is still functioning.

== Climate ==
Climate data for Savusavu (Savusavu Airport, 1991–2020 normals)
Month	Jan	Feb	Mar	Apr	May	Jun	Jul	Aug	Sep	Oct	Nov	Dec	Year
Mean daily maximum °C (°F)	30.6 (87.1)	30.8 (87.4)	30.8 (87.4)	30.0 (86.0)	28.7 (83.7)	27.9 (82.2)	27.2 (81.0)	27.1 (80.8)	27.6 (81.7)	28.2 (82.8)	29.2 (84.6)	30.1 (86.2)	29.0 (84.2)
Daily mean °C (°F)	27.2 (81.0)	27.4 (81.3)	27.4 (81.3)	26.9 (80.4)	25.8 (78.4)	25.1 (77.2)	24.4 (75.9)	24.3 (75.7)	24.7 (76.5)	25.3 (77.5)	26.1 (79.0)	26.9 (80.4)	26.0 (78.7)
Mean daily minimum °C (°F)	23.7 (74.7)	23.9 (75.0)	23.9 (75.0)	23.7 (74.7)	22.8 (73.0)	22.2 (72.0)	21.5 (70.7)	21.4 (70.5)	21.8 (71.2)	22.4 (72.3)	23.0 (73.4)	23.6 (74.5)	22.8 (73.0)
Average precipitation mm (inches)	284.6 (11.20)	220.1 (8.67)	212.6 (8.37)	202.5 (7.97)	166.4 (6.55)	123.9 (4.88)	75.1 (2.96)	101.1 (3.98)	113.2 (4.46)	173.9 (6.85)	186.7 (7.35)	198.4 (7.81)	2,058.5 (81.04)
Average precipitation days (≥ 0.1 mm)	15.9	15.1	15.5	13.6	11.8	9.8	8.9	10.1	9.6	10.7	12.7	14.7	148.4
Source: World Meteorological Organization

== Economic activities ==
Savusavu was originally established as a trading centre for sandalwood, beche-de-mer, and copra, and is the site of a major copra mill. Tourism is growing in importance, owing to its SCUBA diving and yachting facilities.

Savusavu hosts a number of resorts, some of which have interesting specialities. Namale Resort hosts regular seminars in the Tony Robbins Life Mastery programme; the Jean Michel Cousteau Resort is one of the few 5 star resorts to offer a children's camp; Daku Resort runs a programme of learning holidays in art, yoga, singing snorkelling and birdwatching throughout the year. The birdwatching tour visits the rare silktail which is only found in the island of Vanua Levu, in a habitat about an hour and a half from Savusavu. The silktail is one of the species listed by Birdlife International as being under threat.

Geothermal energy is a resource waiting to be tapped. A geological survey has found that Savusavu's hot springs could generate enough electricity to power the entire island of Vanua Levu. Known locally as Nakama hot springs water from the geothermally heated pools which can reaches close to 100 degrees Celsius, have been used by local villagers for centuries to cook taro, breadfruit and other local foods.

On 2 August 2022, the geothermal pools become an official tourist attraction. A F$75,000 project orchestrated by the Blue Town Committee and promoted by the Savusavu Tourism Association refurbished Nakama hot spring with landscaping, stone walls, signage, steps and drains around the springs. Locals are still permitted to cook their food on the premises and even sell prepared dishes.

Most land in Fiji is owned by native land owners – the mataqali (extended family unit). Savusavu and surrounding areas has a large amount of freehold land, much of it once used for coconut plantations. Increasingly this land has been subdivided and sold, often to expats seeking a retirement or holiday home. As a result, Savusavu is now home to a small but significant community of Americans, Australians, New Zealanders and Europeans which has helped fuel its economic development. Savusavu is one of the emerging markets in Fiji with a lot of developments taking place.

== Politics ==
Incorporated as a town in 1969, Savusavu is governed by a 9-member town council, elected for a three-year term. The councillors elect a mayor from among themselves for a one-year term, which may be renewed any number of times. Following the victory of the Savusavu Ratepayers and Citizens Party in the municipal elections held on 22 October 2005, Ram Pillay was chosen as mayor, succeeding Peni Naulu of the Lighthouse Party.

In 2009, the Military-backed interim government dismissed all municipal governments throughout Fiji and appointed special administrators to run the urban areas. As of 2015, elected municipal government has not been restored. The special administrator of Savusavu, along with nearby Labasa, is Vijay Chand.

== Transportation ==
The town is served by Savusavu Airport.
