= Chandra Singh =

Fijian politician

Chandra Singh is a former Fijian politician of Indian descent, who was one of the eight nominees of the Leader of the Opposition to the Senate of Fiji after the 2006 elections.
