= Labasa =

Labasa लम्बासा
- Town and Tikina (District)
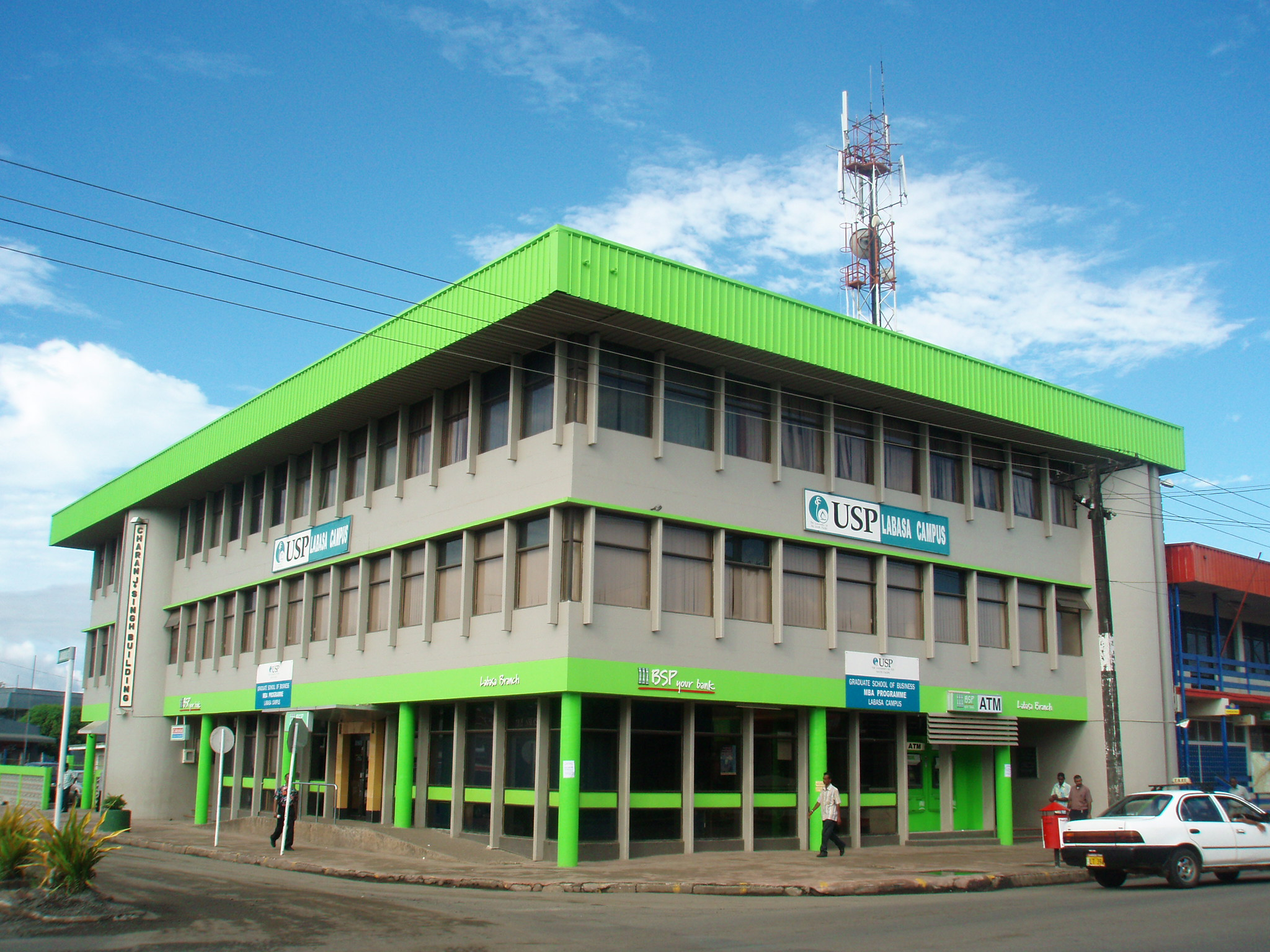
- University of the South Pacific, Labasa

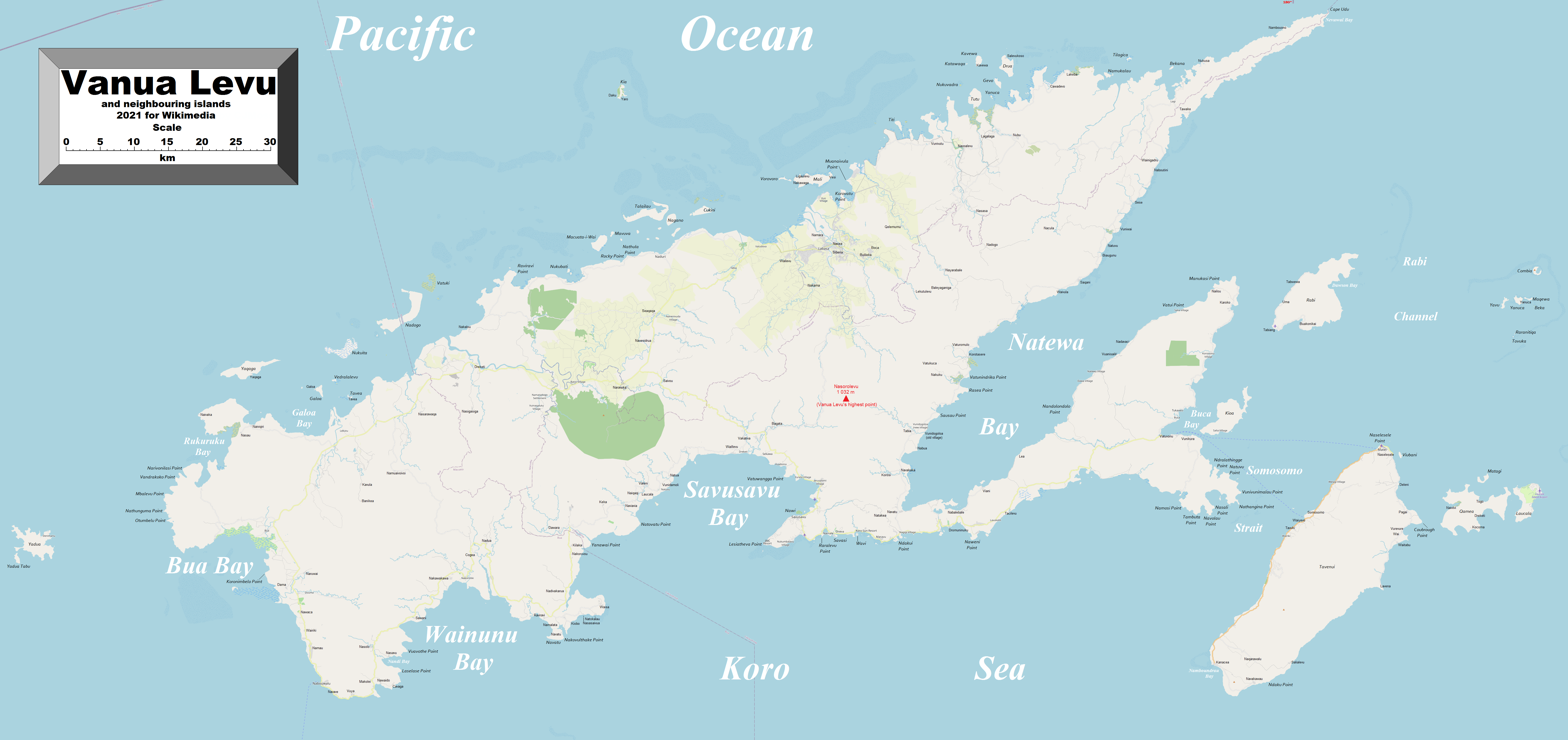
- Vanua Levu with Labasa in the north

- Location in Fiji
- Coordinates: 16°25′52″S 179°22′13″E
- Country: Fiji
- Island: Vanua Levu
- Division: Northern Division
- Province: Macuata

Population (2017)
  - Total: 22,204
  - Tikina: 49,369
- Time zone: UTC+12

Labasa (Fijian pronunciation: [lamˈbasa], Hindi: लम्बासा) is a town in Fiji with a population of 28,500 at the 2010 census.

Labasa is located in Macuata Province, in the north-eastern part of the island of Vanua Levu, and is the largest town on the island. The town itself is located on a delta formed by three rivers – the Wailevu, the Labasa (after which the town is named), and the Qawa.

The township (unlike in the past) is now less dependent on the sugar industry. The farmers' market offers seasonal produce and seafood. The main street is lined with small family-run businesses, supermarkets and restaurants offering a lively pedestrian thoroughfare.

== History ==
The first investment in the territory was done by the British in 1893, with the founding of the Labasa Sugar Mill.

Labasa town was established back in 1922, serving the sugar cane farms and farm workers with harvesting season resulting in significant seasonal employment.

The initial urbanization and economic effort in Labasa was halted temporarily by a hurricane that hit Labasa back in 1929, damaging infrastructures significantly.

By the 1930s new buildings started to sprout, including the "Jagannath, Nanhu and Company". These companies had significant economic boost from the creation of the Fiji Sugar Corporation in the 1940s.

The town however truly started to become more urbanized and richer from 1963 onwards, at an exponential rate.

== Demographics and culture ==
Labasa is heavily Indo-Fijian, and downtown Labasa is consequently filled with curry houses and sari shops. It is the fourth-largest city in Fiji.

Known as the Friendly North for its warm, hospitable culture, Labasa is home to the popular Festival of the Friendly North, which has run for over 40 years and has resulted in over 1.3 million in charitable projects in the region.

== Climate ==
Climate data for Labasa (1991–2020 normals)
Month	Jan	Feb	Mar	Apr	May	Jun	Jul	Aug	Sep	Oct	Nov	Dec	Year
Mean daily maximum °C (°F)	31.8 (89.2)	31.9 (89.4)	32.0 (89.6)	31.5 (88.7)	30.8 (87.4)	30.2 (86.4)	29.8 (85.6)	29.9 (85.8)	30.6 (87.1)	31.0 (87.8)	31.6 (88.9)	31.9 (89.4)	31.1 (88.0)
Daily mean °C (°F)	27.2 (81.0)	27.2 (81.0)	27.3 (81.1)	26.7 (80.1)	25.5 (77.9)	24.7 (76.5)	24.1 (75.4)	24.4 (75.9)	25.2 (77.4)	25.8 (78.4)	26.6 (79.9)	27.0 (80.6)	26.0 (78.8)
Mean daily minimum °C (°F)	22.5 (72.5)	22.5 (72.5)	22.5 (72.5)	21.8 (71.2)	20.3 (68.5)	19.2 (66.6)	18.4 (65.1)	18.8 (65.8)	19.6 (67.3)	20.5 (68.9)	21.5 (70.7)	22.2 (72.0)	20.8 (69.4)
Average precipitation mm (inches)	411.7 (16.21)	389.7 (15.34)	339.3 (13.36)	231.7 (9.12)	96.9 (3.81)	75.4 (2.97)	47.0 (1.85)	51.3 (2.02)	70.0 (2.76)	105.9 (4.17)	160.4 (6.31)	236.6 (9.31)	2,215.9 (87.24)
Average precipitation days (≥ 1.0 mm)	17.3	16.3	16.9	12.0	7.0	4.9	3.8	4.6	5.7	8.2	10.8	14.1	121.6
Source: World Meteorological Organization

== Economic activities ==
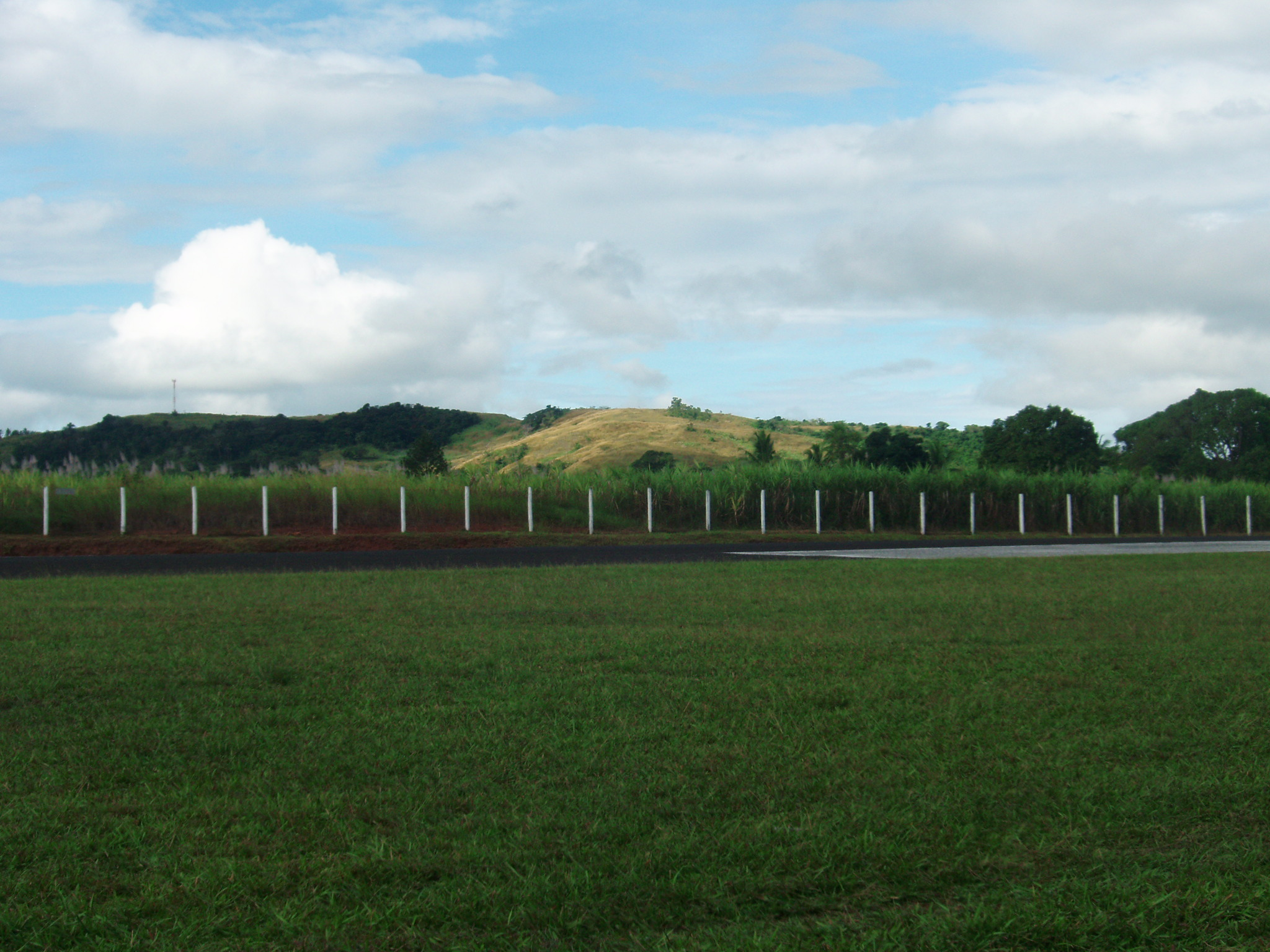
Labasa airport

The surrounding areas of Labasa are mostly farming areas, which contribute to much of the industry in the town. The largest crop grown is sugar cane. The large Fiji Sugar Corporation-1894 sugar mill on the outskirts of Labasa town is the only such mill on the island.

Recently, due to political changes and loss of overseas markets, sugar cane farming and production has been steadily decreasing. This has been reflected in the increasing migration of people to the main island of Viti Levu, in search of employment opportunities.

Labasa Hospital is the referral centre for all health centres and hospital on the island of Vanua Levu, and has recently been expanded.

Labasa is generally an agricultural town, off the tourist track. The Labasa Airport is located in Waiqele about 7 km from the town centre with multiple daily domestic flights to Nausori and Nadi international airports. Passenger ferry connections require an overland trip to either Nabouwalu or Savusavu. Labasa has a couple of hotels to stay in (Takia/Travel Lodge and Grand Eastern Hotel). There is at least one movie theatre and several restaurants in the main street providing a range of local and Chinese flavours.

There is a fairly large market towards the end of the town where one can buy and sample a range of foods, spices, fish, poultry, goats and other local products. A large taxi stand and a bus stop is also by the market.

It also has some popular tourist spots while the people of Labasa are quite well known for their hospitality.

Labasa also has seen major developments such as the construction of the Damodar Center complex which has become a major hub connecting people in Vanua Levu.

== Sports ==
Labasa is a soccer loving town. The Labasa football team is known as the "Babasiga Lions" and play their home games at Subrail Park. Its most famous talent is Roy Krishna, born and bred in Siberia, a farming community about five kilometres from Labasa town. Krishna was also Fiji's flag bearer to the 2019 Pacific Games held in Samoa. The football team also has the veteran Taniela Waqa who has been known as the backbone of the team.

== Local government ==
Incorporated as a town in 1939, Labasa is governed by a 12-member town council, whose members elect a Mayor from among themselves. Councillors serve three-year terms; the Mayor's term is for one year, but may be extended any number of times. Labasa's current Mayor, elected on 28 October 2005 following the municipal election to the town council one week earlier, is Dr Pradeep Singh of the Fiji Labour Party (FLP). Leslie Williams was chosen as his deputy, but was replaced by Shivlal Nagindas on 30 October 2006.

In 2009, the Military-backed interim government dismissed all municipal governments throughout Fiji and appointed special administrators to run the urban areas. As of 2015, elected municipal government has not been restored. The special administrator of Labasa, along with nearby Savusavu, is Vijay Chand.

== Notable people ==
- Roy Krishna, footballer
- Kameli Soejima, rugby union player
- Semi Valemei, rugby league player
