= Peni Volavola =

Fijian politician

Captain Ratu Peni Volavola OF is a former Lord Mayor of the Fijian capital of Suva.

Volavola, a Councillor representing the Tamavua ward, was elected Lord Mayor in 2003, under a memorandum of understanding between of his Soqosoqo Duavata ni Lewenivanua (SDL) and the National Federation Party (NFP) of his predecessor, Chandu Umaria, according to which the two parties agreed to hold the Mayoralty for one year each, with the parties choosing the Lord Mayor jointly in the third year (2004). The coalition collapsed in 2004, however, forcing Volavola to forge a new coalition. In a rare display of cooperation between the SDL and the Fiji Labour Party (FLP), its main rivals at the national level, five FLP councillors voted for Volavola to remain in office. Vinod Lal of the FLP was elected as his deputy.

Volavola's reelection came in the face of criticism from Umaria that he had not built a single bus shelter during his first term as mayor, a criticism that Volavola acknowledged, but defended citing the absence of funding. Umaria reiterated the charge during the municipal election campaign of November 2005. Volavola counter-attacked by accusing Umaria of mismanagement and abuse of public funds amounting to almost F$8 million while he was Lord Mayor, and on 11 November it was reported that Umaria was suing him for defamation.

In August 2005, Volavola ordered an inquiry into rumors of corruption involving Deputy Lord Mayor Vinod Lal. The inquiry was still current as the city went to the polls on 12 November to elect a new city council. The result was a landslide win for the SDL, which took 12 of the 20 seats, a gain of 5. The NFP retained only 5 of the 8 seats it had held, while the FLP was reduced from 5 seats to 3. The new council reelected Volavola unopposed on 17 November, with Josefa Gavidi, also of the SDL, as his deputy.

He was re-elected in November 2008 for a record-setting sixth term. He was subsequently dismissed from office, however, by the Military-backed regime that had taken power in a military coup on 5 December 2006.

== Church official ==
Volavola was elected vice-president of the Methodist Church of Fiji and Rotuma, Fiji's largest Christian denomination, on 31 August 2006.

Preceded by Chandu Umaria	Lord Mayor of Suva; 2003 - 2009	Succeeded by present incumbent
