= 2005–2006 Fijian political crisis =

Political crisis in Fiji

2005-2006 Fijian political crisis
Date	December 2005 – January 2006
Location	Fiji
Result	2006 Fijian coup d'état

Belligerents
Faction of the Fijian Armed Forces; Supported by: Soqosoqo ni Vakavulewa ni Taukei; Fiji Labour Party	Government of Fiji: Fijian Police; Fijian Armed Forces

Commanders and leaders
(Fiji) Jone Baledrokadroka	(Fiji) Frank Bainimarama

The tension between Fiji's government and military forces, which had been simmering for more than two years, appeared to escalate in late December 2005. Tension between the government and the military had been simmering throughout the year, with Commodore Bainimarama and other military officers making strongly worded public statements opposing certain government policies, including the early release from prison of persons implicated in the Fiji coup of 2000, and the government's promotion of controversial legislation to establish a Commission with the power to grant amnesty to perpetrators of the coup.

== Military chief challenges government to dismiss him ==
Commodore Frank Bainimarama, Commander of the Republic of Fiji Military Forces, publicly challenged Home Affairs Minister Josefa Vosanibola and his chief executive Lesi Korovavala on 22 December to visit the Queen Elizabeth Barracks and dismiss him.

The commander declared that he would ignore any written dismissal; the minister and the chief executive would have to confront him in person. If the minister refused to follow his advice, he could run the military on his own, he said. Bainimarama also stated his intention to commandeer Korovavala's office, and claimed to have ordered Army engineers to secure it. "I do not care where he will go to. All I know is that I will now be stationed in that office," the Commander declared. The commander also suggested that the government should consider dismissing Vosanibola, and that if the minister failed to take his advice, removing him from office would be his next step.

== Emergency meetings and mediation ==
On 28 December, Deputy Police Commissioner Moses Driver and Assistant Police Commissioner (Crime) Kevueli Bulamainaivalu said that Commissioner Andrew Hughes was monitoring the threats made against Korovavala. Anare Jale, meanwhile, told Fiji Village that the police would be asked to intervene if Commodore Bainimarama tried to remove Korovavala from office. That afternoon, Home Affairs Minister Vosanibola told Fiji Village that he had briefed Vice-President Ratu Joni Madraiwiwi and Attorney-General Qoriniasi Bale in the morning. The threats were being taken seriously, he said, and "appropriate action" would follow.

Joji Kotobalavu, the chief executive officer in the Prime Minister's Department, who chaired an emergency meeting of officials on the 28th, claimed that Vice-President Madraiwiwi had summoned Bainimarama during the afternoon, but military spokesman Captain Neumi Leweni denied this. Also present at the meeting were Anare Jale, Solicitor-General Nainendra Nand, and the Acting CEO of Home Affairs, Saverio Baleikanacea. Leweni claimed that in seizing the office of the Home Affairs CEO, Bainimarama was merely appropriating an office that had originally been allocated to the military, but which had not hitherto been occupied by them. The whole of the second floor of government buildings was supposed to be allocated to the Army, Leweni said. The military was not concerned about the emergency meeting, Leweni said, as it would deal directly with the persons involved.

Vosanibola was quoted on 29 December by the Fiji Times and Fiji Live that there was no cause for alarm, and that everything was under control. He had taken personal charge of the matter, he said. The commissioning of Judge Advocate Leung for the court martial retrial would be processed "soon", he promised. Fiji Live also reported that Vice-President Madraiwiwi would be meeting Commodore Bainimarama in the first week of January 2006 in an effort to defuse the tension.

In a further development, Bainimarama declared on the last day 2005 that he would no longer recognize Josefa Vosanibola as the minister in charge of the military forces. "The Military now is on its own and is not answerable to anyone", the commander said. In convening the court martial retrial, the military would now act unilaterally, he said. He repeated his challenge to the government to dismiss him.

The commander went on to say that much of the Qarase government's legislation was "racist", and that the government was tailoring its legislation to suit only a very few people, not the country as a whole. "I am the one who is standing for democracy and the rule of law because the Government and its officials only want the laws to be made to suit them", he said.

Captain Leweni criticized Vosanibola on 3 January 2006 for involving the Office of the President in the dispute. "The RFMF will now ask the minister why they are going back to the very office they have disobeyed by not processing the appointment of the judge advocate made by the President", Leweni said.

=== No more coups ===
Bainimarama assured his senior officers, however, that he was not contemplating a coup, according to a statement from military spokesman Captain Neumi Leweni quoted that day in the Fiji Sun. Rumours of a coup plot had been fabricated by certain government officials overreacting to the commander's comments, in an attempt to discredit the commander and the military, which did not want a coup, Leweni said.

== Calls for government to resign ==
In a fresh attack on 3 January 2006, Bainimarama called on the government to resign. The government had no intention, he said, of closing the events of 2000, and was continuing to promote racist legislation. "They have let people out of jail on one excuse or the other. How can they (the Government) sleep at night – do they have a clear conscience?" He went on to call for its resignation. "This government is incompetent," the Fiji Times quoted him as saying. "It's better that they resign so that better people can do the things that is supposed to bring us good."

Bainimarama's criticism of government decisions was not limited to legal issues. On 6 January, he condemned the earmarking of F$90,000 for the planned visit of American evangelist Benny Hinn, saying the money should have been given to the poor.

== Arms shipment to police ==
The Fiji Sun reported on 8 January 2006 that the military was monitoring a shipment of arms sent to the Fiji police force the previous week. Police spokesman Samuela Matakibau, Assistant Commissioner of Police Operation, confirmed the previous evening that a shipment had been received, insisting that the arms were merely replacements for old ones.

Military spokesman Captain Neumi Leweni strongly criticized the shipment, and called on the government to reveal its motives for supplying the weapons to the police force. The arms had actually been purchased for Fijian soldiers serving in Iraq, Leweni claimed, before being diverted to the police, and the military wanted an explanation.

The concern of the military was supported by Fiji Labour Party (FLP) parliamentarian Lekh Ram Vayeshnoi, and by Ema Druavesi, General Secretary of the Soqosoqo ni Vakavulewa ni Taukei (SVT). Vayeshnoi called for an investigation into what he said was a misuse of funds, involving the diversion of arms bought for the military to the police. Druavesi blamed Home Affairs Minister Josefa Vosanibola for the diversion of the shipment, and questioned the government's motives in arming the police. "Is the government relying on the police to be used in a confrontational between the two security forces? Blood of Fijians is going to flow if there is a confrontation," she declared. She called on the police to return the weapons to the military.

Lieutenant Saula Tuikoro, a former Fiji Intelligence Service agent, told the Fiji Sun on 8 January that the diversion of the shipment was a sinister move on the part of the government to counter the Army. The weapons were more modern and of superior quality to those possessed by the military, Tuikoro said. He saw this as a threat to national security. "(The) government is now equipping the police to take on the army," he claimed.

Police Commissioner Andrew Hughes defended the shipment on 9 January. The Fiji Village news service reported him as saying that the weapons had been purchased from the police budget and were low-power weapons, unsuitable for military use. They would be used only in life-threatening emergencies by officers from the Police Tactical Response Unit, a new mobile police team based in Nasinu, Hughes said.

The issue flared up again in March. On the 15th, Fiji Live quoted Leweni as accusing the police of purchasing F$1.5 million worth of weapons from South Korea. The shipment allegedly included 123 pistols, 30 submachine guns, and assorted warfare equipment. He also charged Commissioner Hughes with complicity in the deal, which he said had been masterminded by the Australian Defence Review Team as part of a package to reduce the size of the military and transfer most of its duties to the police. Hughes was deliberately arming Fijians against Fijians, he said. Commodore Bainimarama went further: the shipment had been intended for the military, he claimed, and had been diverted to the police by the government.

Hughes expressed surprise at the strong language, and said that the military was mistaken. The arms had been purchased as per the government's budget allocation to the police, he claimed, for the purpose of countering "armed criminals" such as terrorists. He was also disappointed that the military had spoken to the media rather than to him directly, he said.

Hughes and Bainimarama met on the 16th and agreed afterwards that the disagreement had been due to a misunderstanding. Hughes accepted some responsibility for having failed to explain the details of the shipment and its purpose sooner. This had been unintentional, he insisted.

== Threat to remove government ==
In another apparent escalation of the dispute, the military released a statement on 9 January 2006, to be published in newspapers the following day, threatening to take control of the country if the government failed to "continue the good fight". It was the military that had entrusted the present government with restoring order and rebuilding the nation in 2000, the statement said, but instead it was continuously promoting "racist" policies and programmes to justify its existence to the indigenous community.

The statement came in response to comments made by Acting Foreign Minister Pita Nacuva in a newspaper interview, claiming that the attitude of the military was merely sour grapes. "It is obvious from Nacuva's comments that the Government makes light of the sour relationship between the Government and the army in past years. The Government would be very naïve to underestimate the intention of the military in this instance," the statement tersely said.

Commodore Bainimarama, for his part, declared that if the government's "racist" policies continued, the military would not hesitate take control of the country. "To the government the military says this is no petty issue. You have the choice to make it right for the nation," the Fiji Live news service quoted him as saying. The death of soldiers in 2000 had yet to be avenged, he said, and the policies of the government prevented the "dark days of 2000" from being erased. He said that political decisions smacked of "a bulling government, lacking in character."

On 11 January, Bainimarama denied a report that he had met secretly with Vice-President Madraiwiwi. He told the Fiji Live news service that the report, published earlier in the Fiji Sun, was not correct, and that he was still waiting for a meeting to be scheduled. On the afternoon of the 12th, however, he told the Fiji Village news service that the meeting had in fact taken place, but said he was not in a position to reveal what had been discussed.

== Reactions to the crisis ==
- See main article: Reaction to the 2005–06 Fijian political crisis.

Both before and after the crisis was resolved on 16 January with a truce brokered by Acting President Ratu Joni Madraiwiwi, the crisis generated a great deal of comment, both locally and internationally.

The faultline between indigenous and Indo-Fijians, which has defined Fijian politics for the last generation, was much less evident in this event. The main players on both sides were ethnic Fijians. Indo-Fijian-led parties appeared divided in their response, with the Fiji Labour Party (FLP) coming close to endorsing a military coup and its chief rival for the Indo-Fijian vote, the National Federation Party condemning it.

== The Baledrokadroka incident ==
Commodore Bainimarama dismissed Lieutenant Colonel Jone Baledrokadroka, the Acting Land Force Commander and effectively the second most senior officer in the Military, on 13 January, alleging insubordination. He subsequently accused Baledrokadroka of plotting a mutiny with "outside" encouragement, implicating the government, and of threatening to shoot him. Baledrokadroka said the allegations were "lies". The confrontation had come about, Baledrokadroka claimed, when Bainimarama had issued him with a "treasonous" order, which he had refused to obey, and accused the Commander of plotting a coup.

== Suva calm, but ... ==
Police Commissioner Andrew Hughes announced that police officers were resuming "normal duties," following a personal assurance from Commodore Bainimarama that there was no threat to national security. The national security alert had been unnecessary and the rumours sweeping the nation had been "media generated," he considered. He also denied rumours that weapons recently purchased by the police were to counter the military should the need arise. "They are not in any sense part of a program initiated by government by me or by anybody else to equip the police to somehow ... counter any military threat," he insisted. "There is no way the police are gearing up to take on that role."

Pending a meeting scheduled for 16 January between the prime minister and military commander, convened by Vice-President Madraiwiwi, The Sunday Star-Times in New Zealand anonymously quoted what it claimed was a senior indigenous Fijian politician under investigation for coup-related offences, as saying that any effort to dismiss Bainimarama could lead to "a bloodbath". The Sunday Star-Times quoted him as expressing doubts that it would come to that, however, because the Commander knew too much. He did not elaborate.

The Sunday Star-Times also noted that unlike previous crises, which were, or were widely seen to be, between indigenous Fijians and Indo-Fijians, the latter were largely absent from the latest conspiracies.

== Conspiracy theories, complaints, and investigations ==
In the aftermath of the crisis, a number of conspiracy theories have been advanced, some of which have sparked investigations and legal proceedings.

=== Josateki Koroi's allegations ===
Fiji Labour Party president Jokapeci Koroi issued a statement on 14 January 2006 accusing Lesi Korovavala, the chief executive officer of the Home Affairs Ministry, of having conspired with Home Affairs Minister Josefa Vosanibola to arrange a secret meeting between Baledrokadroka and Prime Minister Laisenia Qarase, in an attempt to depose Bainimarama. This was Koroi's second controversial statement in less than a week, having said on Fiji Television on the 11th that the FLP would support a military coup.

Qarase angrily denied the allegations against him and the two public servants on the 15th, challenged Koroi to substantiate them, and said that he had filed charges against her for inciting violence, rebellion, and instability. "This is an outrageous allegation and everything that she is talking about is an absolute lie," the Fiji Sun quoted him as saying of Koroi's allegations. He was not mollified by a later statement by the FLP that her remarks had been taken "out of context." "Television pictures do not lie," Qarase said. He was still indignant on the 18th, condemning FLP leader Mahendra Chaudhry for trying to divert attention from Koroi's statement. Wild allegations were a "hallmark" of the FLP, Qarase claimed. He announced that a complaint had been laid with the police.

The same day, however, Commodore Bainimarama supported the FLP's claims. At a press conference, he alleged that the military had tapped a telephone conversation in which Baledrokadroka was asked to elicit support from senior officers for the removal of Bainimarama.

Powerful people were trying to remove him, he claimed, in order to derail his work to prosecute perpetrators of the 2000 coup.

Meanwhile, police spokeswoman Sylvia Low had confirmed the day before that a complaint had been received from the military, calling for an investigation into possible collusion between Baledrokadroka and government officials over an alleged attempt to incite a mutiny. On 20 January, Low told the Fiji Times that two complaints had been received concerning Jokapeci Koroi, one from Home Affairs Minister Josefa Vosanibola concerning her public endorsement of a potential military coup, and the other from Lesi Korovavala, chief executive officer of the Home Affairs Ministry, concerning allegations she had made about his alleged role in an alleged army mutiny on 12 January.

The Fiji Sun quoted Regional Development Minister Ted Young on 21 February as saying that Koroi's endorsement of a possible coup had resulted in a major downturn in the tourism industry.

=== Poseci Bune's meeting with Bainimarama ===
It was confirmed by the military on 17 January that Poseci Bune, the Deputy Leader of the Fiji Labour Party (FLP), had met with Bainimarama at Suva the Queen Elizabeth Barracks on the 15th, a day before Bainimarama's crucial meeting with the prime minister at Government House. Military spokesman Captain Neumi Leweni strongly denied claims that Bune's visit had been to influence the commander to continue with his anti-government campaign. The meeting had been above-board, Leweni said. Bune clarified that his meeting with the commander had not been as a representative of the FLP.

== Bainimarama clarifies ==
The Fiji Times printed a statement from Commodore Bainimarama on 16 January, the same morning that he was meeting the prime minister with Acting President Ratu Joni Madraiwiwi as mediator, insisting that there was nothing political about his anti-government pronouncements. He had never commented except when he believed that government policies were undermining national security, he claimed. "I really don't have any business in the political running of government. My outbursts are not political. It's about national security," he told the Fiji Times. "Security to me and the RFMF means a clean and corrupt-free country," he added.

He said that his public attacks on government policies had begun when the government had started interfering with the judicial process. A unilateral government decision in 2003 to commute the sentences of soldiers involved in the Labasa mutiny that took place while the coup was in progress, had been taken without consulting the military, he claimed.

== The Government House truce ==
At a two-hour meeting at Government House, the official residence of the president, that ended around noon on 16 January, Acting President Ratu Joni Madraiwiwi succeeded in brokering a truce between the prime minister and the military commander. The two men arrived separately, Prime Minister Qarase five minutes ahead of schedule and Bainimarama twelve minutes late.

A statement issued by Madraiwiwi said that following a frank discussion, both men had agreed to put the "national interest" first. Commodore Bainimarama had agreed to consult the Ministry of Home Affairs before making any further statements to the media. Prime Minister Qarase, in turn, had promised not to interfere with police investigations into alleged accomplices of the 2000 coup perpetrators, and had agreed to "address" the military's concerns over controversial legislation, including the Reconciliation, Tolerance, and Unity Bill. The military commander and the police commissioner would both be allowed to attend meetings of the National Security Council as observers. "Both recognised the need to put the national interest first. In the light of that consideration, the Prime Minister has agreed that the Commander and the Commissioner of Police be invited to participate in the Security Council as observers," the acting president said. On 18 January, however, the prime minister clarified that the commander and the commissioner would attend Security Council meetings only by invitation, and only when deemed necessary.

In addition, it was agreed that the prime minister would from now on deal directly with the two officers, rather than through subordinate ministers or civil servants. He would meet regularly with the commander to discuss matters of mutual concern, he said. "These meetings will create a new avenue for dialogue between the Government and the military rather than discussions in the media," prime minister Qarase told the Fiji Live news service.

The prime minister also revealed on 17 January that he had promised the commander that the upcoming general election would be conducted independently, without government interference.

Madraiwiwi called on both parties to be cautious and responsible in their dealings with each other. "It is critical that elements in the Government and the military exercise circumspection and discretion in their dealings with each other at all times," he said.

The meeting had also reestablished normal channels of communication between the government and the military, Madraiwiwi said. He thanked both men for the way in which the meeting had been conducted.

On 20 January, Bainimarama attempted to clarify his view of the agreement on Fiji Television. His agreement not to talk to the media was conditional, he said, on being allowed to make representations to the government. If the government failed to address his concerns, he was not precluded from commenting publicly, he considered. He made the remarks with respect to his complaint against Lesi Korovavala, chief executive officer of the Public Service Commission, whom the military wants removed.

It was revealed on 26 January that the meeting had been tape recorded at the request of Commodore Bainimarama, with the approval of Acting President Madraiwiwi. The tape is now the property of the military, according to Fiji Television, and is now being studied by senior military officers.

== Aftermath ==
The aftermath of the crisis had repercussions for both the military and the government.

=== Investigation undertaken ===
Military spokesman Captain Neumi Leweni said on 17 January that the military was undertaking a review to improve its intelligence services. A board of inquiry had also been set up to investigate officers accused of having sided with Baledrokadroka in the alleged mutiny, he revealed. Baledrokadroka himself was expected to be called as a witness, he revealed.

The same day, Commodore Bainimarama strongly denied allegations made by Baledrokadroka that he had been planning a coup. According to the Fiji Times, he denied that there was any connection between his own media statements and the expected retirement in March of President Ratu Josefa Iloilo or the absence from the country of parliamentary Speaker, Ratu Epeli Nailatikau, himself a former military commander. Nailatikau's visit to Fijian troops serving as peacekeepers in Iraq was at his own request and had been approved by the Home Affairs Ministry, he said; the military had nothing to do with it. Likewise, the expected presidential election was the prerogative of the Great Council of Chiefs, he said; it was nothing to do with the military.

Bainimarama also claimed to have been aware of Baledrokadroka's ambition to hold the position of commander, and to have monitored him for five weeks before dismissing him.

Leweni announced on 20 January that four senior army officers had been appointed the day before to investigate the alleged mutiny plot. The four officers would not be named until they had completed their work, Leweni said.

=== PSC investigates complaint against Korovavala ===
The Public Service Commission (PSC) chairman Stuart Huggett revealed to the Fiji Times on 19 January that they had received a formal complaint from Commodore Bainimarama about Lesi Korovavala, the chief executive officer of the Home Affairs Ministry. Bainimarama accused Korovavala of having instigated an alleged threat of mutiny by Lieutenant Colonel Jone Baledrokadroka, the then-Acting Land Force Commander. Earlier, Bainimarama had claimed evidence of a telephone conversation between Baledrokadroka and somebody from outside the camp; the Fiji Times implied this to be Korovavala. The Fiji Village news service, meanwhile, reported that the military had gathered information that Baledrokadroka had met with Korovavala on a number of occasions.

Korovavala told Fiji Village that the allegations were false, and had been referred to the police. Huggett also confirmed that the PSC had received a letter from Korovavala denying the allegations.

Military spokesman Captain Neumi Leweni said that nothing short of Korovavala's removal would satisfy the military. This had been a key military demand before the accord brokered by Vice-President Madraiwiwi on 16 January, and quickly surfaced again. Radio Gold reported on the 17th that Bainimarama had raised the issue at the meeting with Madraiwiwi and Qarase, accusing Korovavala of having caused the friction between the government and the military. According to Radio Gold, Bainimarama had told them that he suspected that Korovavala had telephoned Baledrokadroka to arrange a meeting with the prime minister, and that he had evidence to support his claim.

Jioji Kotobalavu, the chief executive officer of the prime minister's department, claimed that the prime minister was not responsible for the contracts of chief executives and could not interfere.

Meanwhile, Home Affairs Minister Josefa Vosanibola told Fiji Television that he, too, had received a copy of Bainimarama's letter. Korovavala had written to the PSC to deny the charges, he said.

Lawyer Isireli Fa said that Korovavala had asked his firm to study the matter and to protect his interests.

Huggett revealed on 20 January that the previous day's meeting of the PSC had decided to appoint an independent team to investigate Bainimarama's complaint against Korovavala. The team would try to deal with the complaints within three months, Huggett told the Fiji Times.

== New tensions ==
Strains in the accord began to surface almost immediately. Police Commissioner Andrew Hughes confirmed on 25 January that police were looking into an official complaint from Home Affairs Minister Josefa Vosanibola, concerning Commodore Bainimarama's threat on 8 January to depose the government. Police Media Relations Officer Sylvia Low said that police were investigating to determine whether the treat was seditious or treasonous.

Vosanibola also questioned the integrity of the office of the Director of Public Prosecutions, asking why it was taking so long to investigate the threatening telephone calls made to several ministers and senior civil servants in April 2005.

Military spokesman Captain Neumi Leweni said that the military had not been informed of the complaint, and was trying to ascertain its basis.

Bainimarama reacted angrily to the revelation, accusing the government of breaching the accord brokered by Acting President Ratu Joni Madraiwiwi on the 16th. He announced his intention to respond on the 27th, warning that the prime minister and home affairs minister "had better be ready."

The Fiji Times reported that Prime Minister Qarase had refused to answer questions pertaining to the latest disagreement, and had switched off his cellphone when contacted. Later, however, he told the Fiji Village news service that he would personally investigate Vosanibola's actions, to prevent any recurrence of the long-running impasse between the government and military.

On 27 January, Vosanibola made any withdrawal of his complaint conditional on an apology from Bainimarama. This provoked an angry response from the commander on the 29th. He called for Vosanibola, whom he described as "beyond help," to be dismissed and charged. The demand that he apologize for his threats against the government was ridiculous, he said. "Asking me to apologise for making that statement is an insult to the working people of this nation because, simply, it is my job," the Fiji Live news service quoted him as saying. He defined the role of the military as ensuring security and the well-being of the people of Fiji, which he accused "people like Vosanibola" of failing to do. The commander's latest statement came notwithstanding the Government House agreement not to speak to the media without consulting the military. "No one is going to attack the military without any retaliation from the military – not even under any agreement," he defiantly declared.

=== Commander withdraws from talks ===
Bainimarama announced on 27 February that on the advice of his senior officers, he had decided to discontinue his fortnightly meetings with the prime minister, saying that no progress had been made and that the talks were therefore pointless. From now on, any cabinet minister – including the prime minister – who wished to see him would have to visit the Queen Elizabeth Barracks headquarters, he told Fiji Village. Spokesman Lieutenant Colonel Orisi Rabukawaqa said that the government had failed to grant soldiers' ration allowances or job evaluation exercises, despite the budget allocation, and raising the matter with the prime minister had proved futile.

Rabukawaqa said that after his weekly meetings with Acting President Madraiwiwi and his fortnightly meetings with Prime Minister Qarase, he would write to both men about issues he wanted addressed. Madraiwiwi replied to the letters, he said; Qarase did not. "We feel that he was just making a fool of us and we have advised the commander not to hold any more meetings with him," Rabukawaqa said.

Home Affairs Minister Josefa Vosanibola responded by saying that Rabukawaqa's comments were not justified, and that concerns that had been raised were being looked into.

The Fiji Sun quoted the prime minister (6 March) as saying that Bainimarama's decision to withdraw from the talks was "unfortunate." Progress had been made during the course of the discussions, he claimed. "What really went wrong was that he expected me and my Government to follow orders. In other words, to do everything he wanted," he later claimed.

=== Renewed warnings from Australia, New Zealand ===
Australia's foreign minister Alexander Downer reiterated earlier warnings to Bainimarama on 24 February 2006, saying that the passage of legislation was not up to the military. "People can have whatever opinions they like on the laws but in the end the parliament should make those laws not the military," The Sydney Morning Herald quoted him as saying. Supported by his New Zealand counterpart, Winston Peters, he warned that another coup would be devastating, not only for the Fijian economy but also for its international relationships. The Military responded by asking Downer to stay out of Fijian politics, saying that Australians could not know what it was like to live through a coup.

Fiji's home affairs minister Josefa Vosanibola added that the military had no authority to interfere with government business. The commander's stated intention to withdraw from meeting the prime minister was disrespectful to the highest office in the land, he told Fiji Live.

The Fijian military responded on the 28th, saying that the safety and security of Fiji were the business of the military. Spokesman Lieutenant Colonel Orisi Rabukawaqa was quoted in the Fiji Times as saying that the views expressed by the Australian and New Zealand foreign ministers were disrespectful and irresponsible. He claimed that the security of the nation and its citizens was constitutionally entrusted to the military, a claim that Vosanibola had disputed.

Fiji Live reported on 1 March that the military had called on Prime Minister Qarase to discipline Home Affairs Minister Vosanibola. Military spokesman Captain Neumi Leweni accused Vosanibola of deliberately failing to understand the constitutional prerogatives of the military. According to Leweni, the 1997 Constitution affirmed the role given to the military in the 1990 constitution. "If Vosanibola cannot understand simple English than he is not worthy to continue in his cabinet portfolio," he said. He accused Vosanibola of committing three serious acts of insubordination since 1983, the most serious, he said, in 2005 when he allegedly tried to thwart President Ratu Josefa Iloilo's decision to appoint Graeme Leung as Judge Advocate of the court martial retrial of former soldiers convicted of their roles in the mutiny that took place at Suva's Queen Elizabeth Barracks on 2 November 2005.

Commodore Bainimarama concurred with Leweni. He told Fiji Live that Vosanibola was incompetent and unfit to hold office. "This kind of incompetent people should not be voted in," he said. "We should vote for only competent people."

In an interview with ABC Television reported by Fiji Live on 3 March, Downer reiterated his earlier opposition to military interference in politics.

=== Great Council of Chiefs asks president, vice-president to intervene again ===
Fiji Live reported on 9 March that the Great Council of Chiefs had expressed concern at the strained relationship between the prime minister and the military commander, and had criticized the latter for his disregard for the government. They asked both President Ratu Josefa Iloilo and Vice-President Ratu Joni Madraiwiwi to mediate.

=== Truth campaign ===
On 10 March, Bainimarama announced that the military was about to embark on a campaign to educate the population about the "lies" being spread by the "opportunists" in the government. "We will go into villages and tell them the real truth of what happened and what is being done ... I will advise the people because they cannot continue to advise a government that continues to make it okay for those that went to jail to get back into society," he told the Fiji Sun. "By not educating the people about doing what is right, it is willfully lying and misleading them."

His proposed campaign was endorsed by Poseci Bune, Deputy Leader of the Fiji Labour Party, but condemned by Ropate Sivo, General Secretary of the Conservative Alliance (whose dissolution he is resisting), and by Saula Telawa, President of the New Nationalist Party. The Sun quoted Sivo again on the 12th, calling for Bainimarama's arrest, saying that the commander himself had a case to answer for his own role in the events of 2000. He accused Bainimarama of fomenting instability and of discouraging foreign investment.

Home Affairs Minister Josefa Vosanibola said on 12 March that he was losing patience with the failure of the president and vice-president to discipline the commander. "I respect Government House but the time has come for them to act," the Fiji Times quoted him as saying. "Why has Government House been sitting on this?"

SDL campaign director Jale Baba said that the military's proposed actions were illegal, and inconsistent with historical reality. He claimed that the policies of the Qarase government were identical to those pursued by the military when it appointed Qarase as prime minister in the first place.

Former Prime Minister Sitiveni Rabuka, despite his support for certain government policies opposed by the military, endorsed the military's campaign on 12 March, according to Fiji Village. Rabuka, himself a former commander of the Army, said that the proposed actions of the military were constitutional.

== New moves ==
News remained quiet through the middle of 2006 until, in a speech at Ratu Latianara Secondary School, Commodore Bainimarama attacked government policies, which he said were creating a culture of lawlessness in Fiji. In the weeks that followed, he continually threatened to remove the government if it failed to implement his demands. The crisis came to a head when, on 26 November, Bainimarama called up 1,000 reserve troops to the Fijian Army, and reiterated his intention to topple the Fijian Government, during a private trip to New Zealand. This came shortly after police revealed that he would shortly be charged with sedition.
