= Richard Naidu =

Fijian lawyer of Indian descent

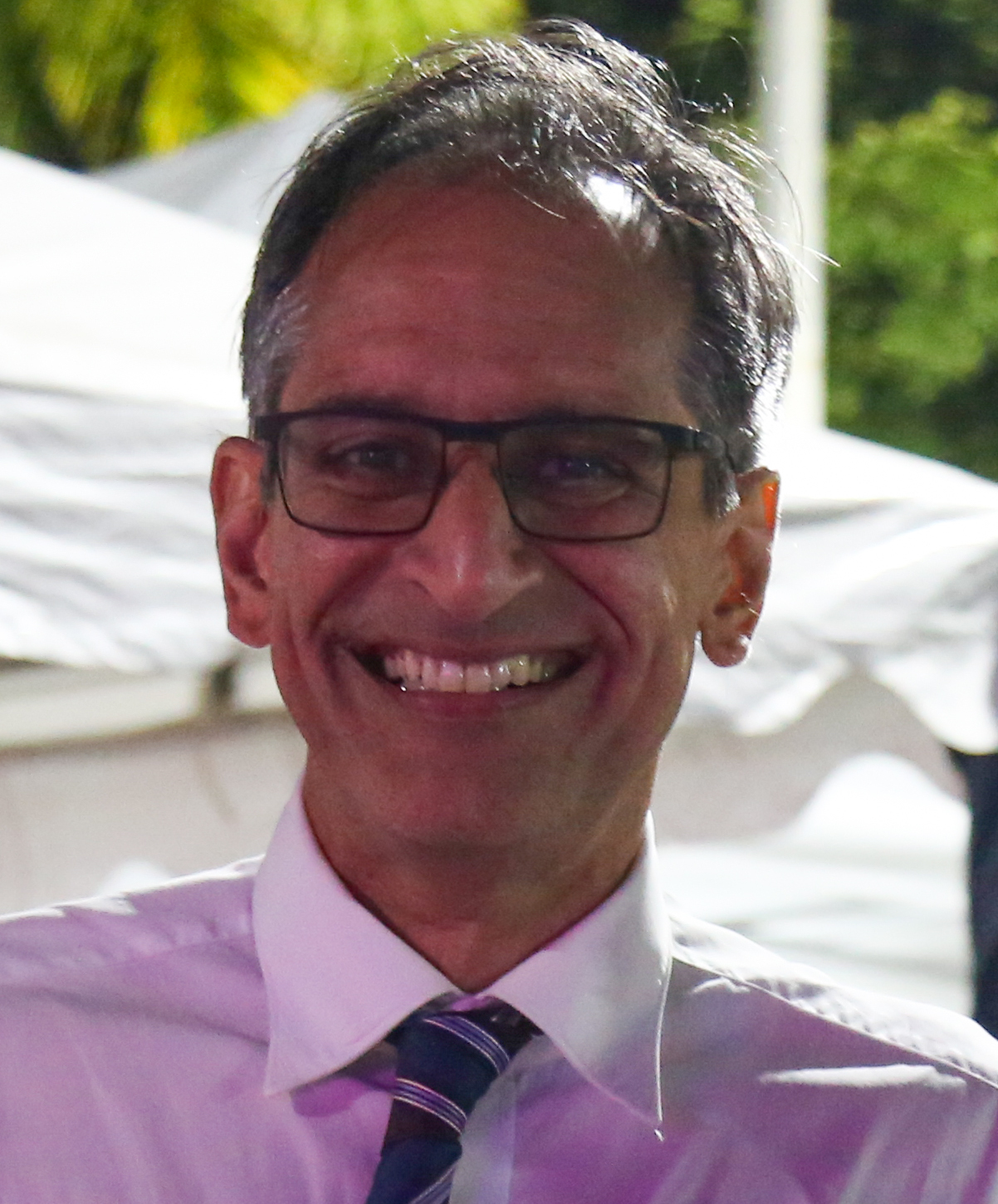
Richard Naidu 2022

Richard Naidu (born 28 June 1963) is an Indo-Fijian journalist, constitutional lawyer and opponent of the 2006 Fijian coup d'état. He is a former director of Transparency International Fiji.

Naidu served as spokesperson for Prime Minister of Fiji Timoci Bavadra. During the 1987 Fijian coups d'état he was beaten by iTaukei militants and his home was burned by arsonists. He was later deported to New Zealand by the military regime. While in exile in New Zealand he studied for a law degree at the University of Auckland. After working as a lawyer in New Zealand, he returned to Fiji in 1995.

He was an opponent of the Qarase government's Reconciliation, Tolerance, and Unity Bill, calling it unconstitutional. During the 2005–2006 Fijian political crisis he argued that the elected government had the power to sack Republic of Fiji Military Forces Commander Frank Bainimarama, and that the President of Fiji must follow the advice of the elected government.

== Naidu and the 2006 coup d'état ==
Naidu opposed the 2006 Fijian coup d'état as illegal and unconstitutional. He condemned the detention and beating of six pro-democracy activists by the military on Christmas eve at the Queen Elizabeth Barracks, and called on the Fiji Human Rights Commission to take a stand against such violations. Naidu also spoke out against the Fiji Human Rights Commission for supporting the coup, ridiculing a report written by the Commission's Director, Shaista Shameem, which endorsed the coup. On 16 January, Naidu dismissed the announcement that the Military had restored Ratu Josefa Iloilo to the Presidency, saying that it did not legitimize the State of Emergency or the interim government.

On 23 January Naidu gave an interview to Radio New Zealand in which he attacked President of Fiji Ratu Josefa Iloilo as a puppet of the Military and the "illegal" interim government. He was also quoted as accusing the interim government of making "illegal laws" ad hoc to circumvent court rulings it did not like. He was subsequently arrested by the military and taken to Queen Elizabeth Barracks for interrogation. He was released after intervention from military Attorney-General of Fiji Aiyaz Sayed-Khaiyum and Human Rights Commissioner and Fiji Women's Crisis Centre coordinator Shamima Ali.

== Post-coup ==
Following the coup, Naidu represented opponents of the regime, such as Fiji Law Society vice-president Tupou Draunidalo and the Fiji Times. In May 2009 he was detained and his computer was searched on suspicion he was involved with an anti-military blog site. In June 2009 he withdrew from speaking at Fiji's Institute of Accountants Congress after threats from police. He later criticised the military regime for denying a permit for the Fiji law Society's annual general meeting.

In 2015 he briefly served on the Constitutional Offices Commission as the leader of the opposition's nominee, resigning in November after claiming it was a rubber-stamp for the regime. He later criticised the government's proposed Parliamentary Powers and Privileges Bill and Code of Conduct Bill for undermining freedom of speech.

In November 2022 he was convicted of contempt of court after pointing out a spelling mistake in a judicial judgement in a Facebook post. The conviction was condemned by Amnesty International, the Commonwealth Lawyers Association, the New Zealand Law Society, the Law Council of Australia, and legal academics. In July 2023 the court set aside the conviction and dismissed the charge.
