= Hector Hatch =

Fijian boxer and politician

Hector Rex Hatch (6 February 1936 – 14 April 2016) was a Fijian boxer, politician, and civil servant. He represented Fiji as a boxer at the 1956 Summer Olympics in Melbourne, Australia. There, he competed in the welterweight category, losing 5–0 on points in the first round to Nicolae Linca of Romania who subsequently won the gold medal.

Hatch served as Minister for Public Enterprises and Public Sector Reform in the interim Cabinet formed by Laisenia Qarase in the wake of the 2000 Fijian coup d'état. He held office till an elected government took power in September 2001.

While visiting New Zealand on 4 January 2007, the Interim Military Government (which had seized power in a coup d'état on 5 December 2006) named Hatch to head the Public Service Commission, replacing Stuart Huggett, who was dismissed for non-cooperation with the military regime. Hatch was charged with the responsibility of downsizing the civil service, which the Military claimed was bloated. His tenure in this position was brief, however: he resigned in the second week of January upon his return to Fiji, citing poor health, and was replaced on 15 January by Rishi Ram.

He died on 14 April 2016.
