= Saula Telawa =

Fijian politician

Saula Telawa was a Fijian nationalist politician who served as President of the now-defunct New Nationalist Party, which advocated indigenous Fijian paramountcy. He also championed the establishment of Christianity, the faith of most indigenous Fijians, as Fiji's official religion. He claimed to be the heir to the legacy of the late nationalist leader Sakeasi Butadroka.

Telawa made media headlines on 12 January 2006, in the midst of a virtual breakdown in relations between the government and Military, which fuelled public fears of a possible coup d'état. The Qarase government's failure to amend the Agriculture, Land, and Tenants Act, which he described as "the heart and soul of the Fijian people," had forfeited its legitimacy with indigenous Fijians, Telawa said, and it should resign. He also called on Police Commissioner Andrew Hughes to stay out of the dispute between the government and the Military, saying that the Australian Hughes, as a non-Fijian, had no right to interfere and in so doing risk the lives of Fijian people.

Telawa made a surprising statement to the Fiji Sun on 19 January 2006, reversing his party's previous demand for the repatriation of Indo-Fijians, some 38 percent of the population, to India. Provided that they were Christians, Telawa said, persons of Indian descent would be welcome to join the party and contest the upcoming election under its banner. References from a Fijian chief and a church pastor would be required, to certify that a prospective candidate had been a born again Christian for at least three years. In September 2006 he called for non-Christian religions to be banned from indigenous land, and for the Native Land Trust Board to prohibit it as a condition of land leases.

Following the 2006 Fijian coup d'état he criticised dictator Frank Bainimarama's inclusion of Indo-Fijians in his cabinet. He subsequently apologised to Bainimarama after being taken to the military barracks.

In August 2008 he was detained by police and interrogated after publicly criticising the military regime's draft People's Charter for Change, Peace and Progress.
