= Modern history of Fiji =

History since independence in 1970

Since attaining independence from the United Kingdom on 10 October 1970, Fijian history has been marked by exponential economic growth up to 1987, followed by relative stagnation, caused to a large extent by political instability following two military coups in 1987 and a civilian putsch in 2000. This was followed by another military coup in 2006. Rivalry between indigenous Fijians and Indo-Fijians, rather than ideological differences, have been the most visible cleavage of Fijian politics. Later in 2020, Fiji was hit by the global COVID-19 pandemic, which affected the economy and the daily lives of the people.

== The ethnic struggle for supremacy ==
Post-independence politics came to be dominated by the Alliance Party of Ratu Sir Kamisese Mara. In the election of March 1977, the Indian-led opposition won a majority of seats in the House of Representatives, but failed to form a government due to internal divisions, together with concern that indigenous Fijians would not accept Indo-Fijian leadership. (See also Fiji Constitutional Crisis of 1977). In April 1987, a coalition led by Dr. Timoci Bavadra, an ethnic Fijian supported by the Indo-Fijian community, won the general election and formed Fiji's first majority Indian government, with Dr. Bavadra serving as Prime Minister. Less than a month later, Dr. Bavadra was forcibly removed from power during a military coup led by Lt. Col. Sitiveni Rabuka on 14 May 1987.

After a period of continued jockeying and negotiation, Rabuka staged a second coup on 25 September 1987. The military government revoked the constitution and declared Fiji a republic on 10 October. This action, coupled with protests by the government of India, led to Fiji's expulsion from the Commonwealth and official nonrecognition of the Rabuka regime by foreign governments, including Australia and New Zealand. On 6 December, Rabuka resigned as Head of State and Governor-General Ratu Sir Penaia Ganilau was appointed the first President of the Fijian Republic. Mara was reappointed Prime Minister, and Rabuka became Minister of Home Affairs.

== Two constitutions ==
The new government drafted a new constitution that went into force in July 1990. Under its terms, majorities were reserved for ethnic Fijians in both houses of the legislature. Previously, in 1989, the government had released statistical information showing that for the first time since 1946, ethnic Fijians were a majority of the population. More than 12,000 Indo-Fijians and other minorities had left the country in the two years following the 1987 coups. After resigning from the military, Rabuka became Prime Minister under the new constitution in 1993.

Ethnic tensions simmered in 1995–1996 over the renewal of Indo-Fijian land leases and political maneuvering surrounding the mandated 7-year review of the 1990 constitution. The Constitutional Review Commission produced a draft constitution which expanded the size of the legislature, lowered the proportion of seats reserved by ethnic groups, reserved the presidency for ethnic Fijians but opened the position of Prime Minister to citizens of all races. Prime Minister Rabuka and President Mara, who had succeeded to the office on Ganilau's death in late 1993, supported the proposal, while the nationalist indigenous Fijian parties opposed it. The reformed Constitution was approved in July 1997. Fiji was readmitted to the Commonwealth in October.

== The 1999 election and the 2000 coup ==
The first legislative elections held under the new constitution took place in May 1999. Rabuka's coalition was defeated by Indo-Fijian parties led by Mahendra Chaudhry, who became Fiji's first Indo-Fijian prime minister. One year later, in May 2000, Chaudhry and most other members of parliament were taken hostage in the House of Representatives by gunmen led by ethnic Fijian nationalist George Speight. The standoff dragged on for 8 weeks, during which time Chaudhry was removed from office by the then-president due to his incapacitation — before the Fijian military seized power and brokered a negotiated end to the situation, then arrested Speight when he violated its terms. In February 2002, Speight was convicted of treason and is currently serving a life sentence. Former banker Laisenia Qarase was named interim Prime Minister and head of the interim civilian government by the military and the Great Council of Chiefs in July. In 2001, after a decision to restore the suspended constitution, Qarase defeated Chaudhry in a hotly contested election.

== The Qarase era and the 2006 coup ==
The 2000 coup left deep divisions in Fijian society. The Qarase government pursued controversial legislation proposing to compensate victims and pardon persons convicted of involvement in the coup. The legislation was presented as a way of laying the past to rest, but further antagonized the Indo-Fijian community as well as some sections of the indigenous Fijian community, including the Republic of Fiji Military Forces. Tensions between the government and the Military kept the nation in suspense from 2004 onwards, and saw a major escalation around the turn of 2005 and 2006. The Qarase government narrowly won reelection in May 2006, and subsequently formed a grand coalition with the rival Fiji Labour Party (FLP). The coalition government failed to placate the Military, however, and in late November it became clear that the government could not enforce its authority when the Military began openly defying its orders. The impasse culminated in a coup d'état on 5 December. Commodore Frank Bainimarama declared himself Acting President. On 4 January 2007, Bainimarama announced that he was restoring executive power to President Iloilo, who made a broadcast endorsing the actions of the military. The next day, Iloilo named Bainimarama as the interim Prime Minister, indicating that the military was still effectively in control.

== The 2009 constitutional crisis and aftermath ==
On 9 April 2009, the Court of Appeal ruled that the Military-backed interim government was illegal, and ordered President Iloilo to appoint a neutral caretaker government pending general elections. Instead of following the court order, the interim government resigned, and Iloilo announced the following day in a televised broadcast that he was abrogating the 1997 Constitution. He dismissed all judges and civil servants, appointed himself Head of State "of the new order", and reappointed Bainimarama as Prime Minister, who announced that elections would not be held until 2014.

Effectively, the Military remained in complete control of the country. Iloilo retired as president in July 2009 and was replaced by Ratu Epeli Nailatikau, a former Commander of the RFMF. A new constitution was promulgated in 2013, leading to elections in September 2014, which were won by Bainimarama and his FijiFirst Party.

== The 2020-2021 COVID-19 pandemic ==
On 19 March, Fiji confirmed its first case of COVID-19 in Lautoka. As a precautionary measure, the Government of Fiji announced the lockdown of the city until 7 April 2020. Later on 2 April, the Government announced a lockdown of Suva, after confirmed cases in the capital. As the cases rose, Prime Minister Voreqe Bainimarama announced a nationwide curfew from 8pm to 5am. Schools and non-essential services was closed and the public was advised to stay at home and practice good hygiene. Since June 2020, Fiji has successfully managed to eliminate community transmissions of the virus and were able to lift its COVID-19 restrictions. The country received its COVID-19 vaccines in early March 2021 and administered it to frontline workers and first responders. As of March 2021, Fiji has confirmed 66 cases of COVID-19 and 2 deaths with the most cases being from the border.
