= Suliasi =

Suliasi is a Fijian masculine given name. Notable people with the name include:

- Suliasi Kurulo (born 1958), Fijian Pentecostal minister and evangelist
- Suliasi Taufalele (born 1988), New Zealand rugby union footballer
- Suliasi Vunivalu (born 1995), Fijian rugby league footballer
