= Electoral Commission (Fiji) =

National election commission

Agency overview
- Formed: January 2014
- Jurisdiction: Fiji
- Headquarters: Suva
- Agency executive: Mukesh Nand, Chairperson
- Website: electoralcommission.org.fj

The Electoral Commission is an independent statutory body responsible for conducting elections in Fiji. It is also responsible for registering Fijian voters, political parties and candidates for elections.

== History ==
The Electoral Commission was established in 1970 when Fiji gained its independence from the United Kingdom. The Commission was led by a chairman appointed by the Governor-General of Fiji at the advice of the Prime Minister. Additionally, a minimum of two and a maximum of four members of the Commission were also appointed by the Governor-General. The Commission was mainly responsible for conducting elections for members of the House of Representatives.

Following the 1987 Fijian coups d'état, the 1970 Constitution was abrogated and the Commission was re-established by the 1990 Constitution of Fiji. However, a constitutional review in 1995 saw the establishment of the 1997 Constitution of Fiji passed by both chambers of Parliament. The Commission remained and continued in existence. The 2006 Fijian coup d'etat resulted in the abrogation of the 1997 constitution and the interim military government issued the State Services Decree 2009 with section 4(1) of the decree establishing the Commission.

Since taking power, the interim military government on 24 May 2007 appointed new members of the Electoral Commission. The appointment was made through a proclamation issued by President Josefa Iloilo. Mohammed Sahu Khan was appointed as chairman along with three other members. The Commission rejected claims made by opposition parties of being "pro-interim regime."

In 2008, the interim government affirmed its commitment to hold general elections in 2009. Later in May, the Commission reaffirmed that commitment However in July 2008, the Commission confirmed that elections will not go as planned unless changes have been made to the electoral system. Interim Prime Minister Frank Bainimarama stated that it does not matter if the changes takes five to ten years.

On 6 September 2013, the country's fourth constitution came into effect. The Electoral Commission was reformed and consisted of seven members led by Chen Bunn Young. The Commission conducted the 2014 Fijian general election under the new constitution; Frank Bainimarama won the election. The opposition parties refused to accept the results and called on the Commission to suspend all counting alleging voter fraud. The Commission ultimately dismissed all claims.

== Functions ==
The functions of the electoral commission according to the Electoral Act 2014:

- Registering voters, political parties and candidates for election
- Issuing and receiving the writ of election
- Declare the election results and allocate seats in Parliament
- Enforces the Electoral Act governing political parties.

== Members ==
According to the 2013 Constitution of Fiji, the Electoral Commission is composed of a chairperson who also qualifies to be a Judge and six other members. They are all appointed by the President of Fiji at the advice of the Constitutional Offices Commission. The Supervisor of Elections serves as the secretary to the Commission.

The current members of the Electoral Commission are:

- Mukesh Nand (Chairperson)
- Jawahar Lal
- Margot Jenkins
- Kavita Raniga
- Selina Wah
- Ateca Ledua
