= Netani Sukanaivalu =

Fijian politician (died 2021)

Minister for Education
- In office 2006–2009

Minister for Lands and Mineral Resources
- In office 2009–2011

Personal details
- Died: 2021
- Political party: National Alliance Party
- Education: Fiji Institute of Technology
- Occupation: Academic, naval officer, politician
- Known for: Founding role in establishing the Fiji National University

Military service
- Branch/service: Fijian Navy
- Rank: Lieutenant Commander

Netani Sukanaivalu (died 2021) was a Fijian academic, naval officer, and Cabinet Minister.

Sukanaivalu was educated at the Fiji Institute of Technology, and later worked there as a lecturer and head of the School for Maritime Studies. In 1988 he was appointed vice-principal of FIT, and in 1990 he was appointed principal. He served as a reserve officer in the Fijian Navy, holding the rank of lieutenant commander. He was an unsuccessful candidate for the National Alliance Party in the 2006 parliamentary election.

He was appointed to dictator Frank Bainimarama's interim Cabinet as Minister for Education following the 2006 Fijian coup d'état. As education Minister he was instrumental in establishing the Fiji National University. He was appointed Minister for Lands and Mineral Resources following the 2009 Fijian constitutional crisis. He resigned from the government in February 2011 to return to running his business. He later served as head of the Fiji National University alumni association.
