= Constitutional Offices Commission (Fiji) =

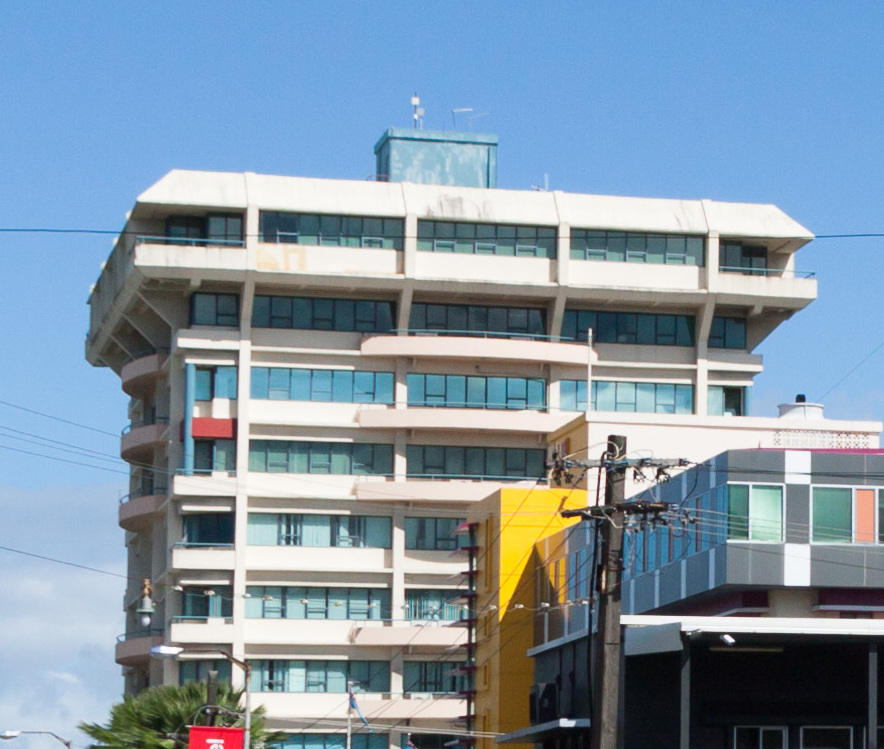
- Suvavou House which houses the headquarters of the Commission
- Formation: 1997; 28 years ago
- Type: Advisory body
- Headquarters: Suvavou House, Suva
- Chairperson: Prime Minister Sitiveni Rabuka
- Key people: 6 members including the chairperson: Sitiveni Rabuka (Chair); Frank Bainimarama; Siromi Turaga; Cema Bolabola; Tupou Draunidalo; Jon Apted

The Constitutional Offices Commission is an advisory body that is responsible for providing advice to the President of Fiji for the appointment of key officials within public offices in Fiji.

== History ==
Established by the 1997 Constitution of Fiji, the Commission originally consisted of a chairperson and two other individuals, all appointed by the President on the advice of the responsible Minister. When the 2013 Constitution of Fiji came into effect, the Commission was re-established but came with many changes including the Prime Minister being a member of the Commission and chairperson.

On 17 April 2015, the Commission held its first meeting since the 2006 coup under the premiership of Frank Bainimarama. Bainimarama's appointee was Ajith Kodagoda. Other members of the meeting included Attorney-General Aiyaz Sayed-Khaiyum, Opposition Leader Teimumu Kepa and her appointee, lawyer Richard Naidu.

== Controversy ==
In November 2015, Ben Groenewald resigned as Police Commissioner citing military interference. Frank Bainimarama as chairperson of the Commission then advised President Epeli Nailatikau to appoint Sitiveni Qiliho who is a senior military officer. Teimumu Kepa called on Bainimarama to revoke the appointment stating that it was "inappropriate" and raised concerns about the independence of the police. Richard Naidu resigned from the Commission claiming the body was politicised.

== Functions ==
According to the 2013 Constitution of Fiji, the Commission is responsible to provide advice to the President in relation to the appointment of key public positions:

- Chairperson and the members of the Fiji Human Rights Commission
- Chairperson and the members of the Electoral Commission
- Supervisor of Elections
- Secretary-General to Parliament
- Chairperson and the members of the Public Service Commission
- Commissioner of Police
- Commissioner of the Fiji Corrections Service
- Commander of the Republic of Fiji Military Forces
- Auditor-General
- Governor of the Reserve Bank of Fiji.

== Members ==
The Commission is composed of six members:

- Prime Minister of Fiji (Chairperson)
- Leader of the Opposition
- Attorney-General of Fiji
- Two individuals selected by the Prime Minister and one by the Opposition Leader.

=== Current members ===
The current members of the Commission are:

- Prime Minister Sitiveni Rabuka
- Opposition Leader Frank Bainimarama
- Attorney-General Siromi Turaga
- Cema Bolabola (Government)
- Jon Apted (Government)
- Tupou Draunidalo (Opposition)
