= RSYC =

RSYC may refer to:

- Royal Southampton Yacht Club, a yacht club located on the Beaulieu River in Hampshire, England
- Royal Suva Yacht Club, a yacht club located in Walu Bay, Suva, Fiji
