= NNP =

NNP may refer to:

- Net National Product
- New Nationalist Party, UK
- New National Party of Grenada
- New National Party (Netherlands)
- New National Party (South Africa)
- New Nationalist Party (Fiji)
- Ninian Park railway station, Cardiff, Wales (by National Rail station code)
