= Suliasi Kurulo =

Fijian Pentecostal minister and evangelist

Suliasi Kurulo (born 1958) is a Fijian Pentecostal minister and evangelist. He is the President and Founder of Christian Mission Fellowship International (CMFI), an international denomination based in Kinoya, Suva, Fiji and is also the senior pastor of World Harvest Center church, located in Suva. He oversees missionaries in such places as the United Kingdom, the United States and Hawaii, Tanzania, Uganda, Madagascar, Kenya, Mozambique, Zambia, Costa Rica, Mexico, Venezuela, Ecuador, Argentina, Chile, Panama, Honduras, Puerto Rico, Cambodia, Thailand, Vietnam, Philippines, Myanmar, Papua New Guinea, Bougainville, Vanuatu, Solomon Islands, Tonga, Cook Islands, Guam, Nauru, Palau, Tuvalu, The Federal States of Micronesian, New Zealand and Australia.

Pastor Suli is a friend of international evangelists Reinhard Bonnke, Luis Palau, Benny Hinn, Dr Elmer Towns, Dr James Davis, the late Dr Myles Munroe, Dr Bill Winston, Bishop Dale Bronner, and was praised by the late Christian Men's Network founder and author Edwin Louis Cole.

He also runs World Harvest Institute, a bible college based at the World Harvest Center in partnership with the world renowned Oral Roberts University from Tulsa Oklahoma. Students, past and present come from all around the Pacific, Asia, Africa and as far as Europe.

== Education and career ==
He was born to a Methodist family in 1958 in the village of Navave, in Bua Province. He was educated initially at Vuya District School, but went to live with an uncle in Toorak, Suva, in 1966 in order to further his education, enrolling in Suva Methodist Primary School. After returning to his village for family reasons, he subsequently boarded at Ratu Kadavulevu School and went on to the Fiji Institute of Technology (FIT), where he studied building and civil engineering before switching to a new course called "Multi-Craft." After graduating from the course, he taught at Bua Secondary School. He returned to FIT in 1978-1979 to complete his building and civil engineering diploma, and subsequently became a cabinet maker.

He started full-time missionary work in 1984. He earned a Bachelor's degree in theology in 1991 and Master's degree in 1993, both from New Covenant International (a Christian university for pastors) in the United States. CMFI now has 20,000 members in Fiji and 5000 churches internationally. He has appeared on the Christian TBN channel in the United States and won the World Pastors Prestigious Award 2005 in January 2006; only one of two annual recipients is allowed to be from outside the United States.

== 2000 and 2006 coup ==
Pastor Suli condemned the overthrow of the governments of Mahendra Chaudhry and Laisenia Qarase by George Speight in 2000 and by the Republic of Fiji Military Forces on 5 December 2006 respectively. The Fiji Times quoted him on 8 December as calling the coup "the manifestation of darkness and evil." He was also vocal in condemning the detention and alleged physical mistreatment of six pro-democracy activists by the Military in the early hours of Christmas morning, with the Fiji Sun quoting him on 26 December as saying that the Military should be ashamed of themselves.

Pastor Kurulo made a blistering attack on President Ratu Josefa Iloilo on 4 January 2007, after Iloilo made a broadcast endorsing the coup and the process that followed. Iloilo was "a puppet of the Military," the Fiji Times quoted him as saying. He went on to say that the president's address "made a mockery of our culture, government and our beloved nation Fiji" and that "To say that he would have done exactly the same thing is a crying shame."

== Personal life ==
He married Mere Dinaulu, a Labasa nurse. They have three sons and one daughter.
