= Jesoni Vitusagavulu =

Fijian businessman and diplomat

Jesoni Vitusagavulu is a Fijian businessman and diplomat, currently serving as ambassador to Israel, becoming the first resident ambassador to Israel from Fiji on 3 February 2026, as the nation opened its embassy in Jerusalem. He was appointed as Fiji's fifth Fijian Ambassador to the United States on 26 May 2005, succeeding Anare Jale. He is also accredited as Ambassador to Cuba and Mexico, and High Commissioner to Canada. He presented his credentials to President George W. Bush on 3 October 2005, and to Governor-General Michaëlle Jean of Canada on 13 June 2006.

== Background and education ==
Vitusagavulu is a native of Kadavu Island. After graduating from the University of the South Pacific with a Bachelor's degree in economics and politics, he completed a Master of Philosophy in development studies from the University of Sussex in the United Kingdom. He also received a diploma in airline management from the University of Bar Ilan in Israel, and a graduate certificate in management from the Australian Graduate School of Management of the University of New South Wales.

== Business career ==
Vitusagavulu was the managing director of Toptier Management, a management consultancy and investment company which he founded in 2003, specializing in assisting local and foreign investors in tourism, information technology, and audio-visual industries. He was Manager for Special Projects with the Fiji Development Bank from 1978 to 1990, when he assumed a senior management position in Air Pacific, which he held till 1996, when he became Chief Executive of the Fiji Trade and Investment Bureau, a position he held until 2003. Previously, he had served on a number of boards, including as chairman of the Agricultural Marketing Authority, Food Processors Limited, and the Kontiki Growth Fund. He has also been a director of the Fijian Trust Fund Board, Kadavu Holdings Limited, and the Kadavu Development Company.

He also lectured for the MBA course at the University of the South Pacific.

Vitusagavulu is known to have been one of former Prime Minister Laisenia Qarase's closest associates.

Vitusagavulu is married to Silina. They have three daughters - Makenesi, Asinate and Leilani.

Preceded by Anare Jale	Ambassador of Fiji to the United States; 2005–2007	Succeeded by ?
