= Anare Jale =

Fijian politician (born 1949 or 1950)

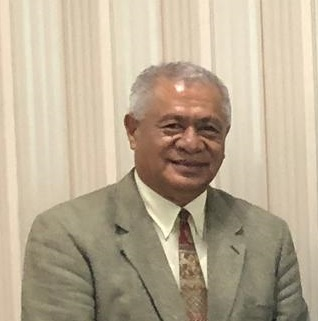
- Anare Jale in 2019

Member of the Fijian Parliament for SODELPA List
- In office 14 November 2018 – 14 December 2022

Fijian Ambassador to the United States
- In office 12 December 2001 – 25 May 2005
- Preceded by: Napolioni Masirewa
- Succeeded by: Jesoni Vitusagavulu

Personal details
- Born: 1949 or 1950 (age 75–76)
- Party: Social Democratic Liberal Party

Anare Jale (born 1949 or 1950) is a Fijian civil servant, diplomat, and politician. He is a former member of the Parliament of Fiji, and vice-president of the Social Democratic Liberal Party.

== Education ==
Jale was educated at Onolevu District School, Ratu Kadavulevu School, and Suva Grammar School, before studying at Victoria University of Wellington in New Zealand and the University of Oxford in the United Kingdom.

== Ambassadorial career ==
Jale joined the Fijian civil service as a labour inspector, and worked for the Ministry of labour for 25 years before becoming deputy secretary for regional development in 1995. From 1997 to 1999, he was permanent secretary for labour and industrial relations, and from 1999 to 2000 he was secretary for the public service. In 2001, he was appointed Fijian Ambassador to the United States.

Following his return to Fiji in 2004, Jale served as chief executive officer of the Public Service Commission (PSC) from May 2005 to 7 December 2006. As Public Service Commissioner he repeatedly clashed with Republic of Fiji Military Forces commander Frank Bainimarama over public service appointments As a result, he was dismissed from office by the military regime after the 2006 Fijian coup d'état. He was subsequently employed by the Solomon Islands Public Service Commission and by he Regional Assistance Mission to Solomon Islands as an advisor.

== Political career ==
In 2013, in the leadup to elections, Jale joined the Social Democratic Liberal Party. He was selected as a SODELPA candidate in the 2014 elections, but was disqualified as a candidate under the Political Parties Decree for non-residency. He stood in the 2018 elections and was elected to parliament, winning 4,287 votes.

In the 2022 elections, Jale ran for re-election under the SODELPA banner, and placed 7th on the party list, winning 735 votes. As SODELPA had only qualified for 3 seats, Jale was not re-elected to a 2nd term. Jale led SODELPA's negotiating team during the subsequent coalition negotiations, and announced its decisions on 20 December and 23 December.
