= Media Industry Development Act 2010 =

Fijian law

- Citation: Decree No. 29 of 2010
- Territorial extent: Fiji
- Passed: 25 June 2010
- Repealed: 6 April 2023

Amended by
- 2015
- Status: Repealed

The Media Industry Development Act 2010 (MIDA) was a law of Fiji which regulates the media. The law was promulgated by the military regime which seized power in the 2006 Fijian coup d'état, in the wake of the 2009 Fijian constitutional crisis, and required media organisations to be 90% Fijian-owned and forbade news reporting "against the national interest or public order", with repressive fines and jail terms for breaches. It established the Media Industry Development Authority of Fiji to enforce the military regime's standards. Originally passed as a decree, it was later renamed an Act.

A draft of the decree was announced in April 2010, with a compulsory meeting of media organisations required to give feedback on it. The draft threatened jail terms of up to five years for journalists reporting "against the national interest or public order", and was condemned by international human rights organisations. A final version with reduced penalties was promulgated in June 2010.

The law was amended in 2015 to remove the $1,000 fine for journalists breaching the decree. The amendments also permitted foreign pay-TV services provided they screened no local content other than advertising, excluding advertising by political parties, NGOs, foreign governments or multi-lateral agencies.

The United Nations Human Rights Council urged reform of the law to respect freedom of the press in Fiji's 2019 Universal Periodic Review.

== Repeal ==
In the leadup to the 2022 Fijian general election both the National Federation Party and People's Alliance promised to review the Act. Following the election, the new coalition government led by Sitiveni Rabuka promised that the law would be repealed and replaced. In January 2023 Minister for Communications Manoa Kamikamica announced a review of the Act, and in February Attorney-General Siromi Turaga publicly apologised to journalists for the oppression they suffered under the Bainimarama regime. later that month, in his maiden speech, Prime Minister Sitiveni Rabuka committed to end the era of "media oppression". The government released a draft bill in March, which retained restrictions on foreign ownership but removed content restrictions. The proposal was rejected by Fijian media organisations, who called for complete repeal. On 29 March 2023 the Fijian government announced that the law would be repealed entirely.

A bill to repeal the Act was introduced into the Parliament of Fiji on 3 April 2023. The bill was passed and the Act repealed on 6 April 2023.
