= Media Industry Development Authority of Fiji =

Independent body that regulates media organizations and services in Fiji

- Formation: June 28, 2010; 14 years ago
- Defunct: April 6, 2023
- Purpose: Media regulation
- Headquarters: Suva
- Budget: $150,000 FJD
- Website: mida.org.fj

The Media Industry Development Authority of Fiji (MIDA) was an independent statutory body that regulated mass media in Fiji. The Authority was established in June 2010 by the Fijian government under the Media Industry Development Decree 2010. It enforces media ethics which governs all media organizations in Fiji as well as regulating media content and implementing rules on advertising. In April 2023, the coalition government led by Prime Minister Sitiveni Rabuka voted to repeal the authority.

The Authority consisted of a chairperson and five members which included the Solicitor-General as well as four others representing the public, one representing consumers, one representing women, one representing children and a journalist representing the media industry. All members including the chairperson are appointed by the Attorney-General of Fiji and serves for 3 years.

== Functions ==
The Authority's functions include:

- to encourage, promote and facilitate the development of media organisations and media services in Fiji
- to advise and make recommendations to the Minister on matters, measures and regulations related to or connected with the media
- to facilitate the provision of a quality range of media services in Fiji which serves the national interest
- to ensure that media services in Fiji are maintained at a high standard in all respects and, in particular, in respect of the quality, balance, fair judgment and range of subject-matter of their content
- to ensure that nothing is included in the content of any media service which is against public interest or order, or national interest, or which offends against good taste or decency and creates communal discord
- to promote local content in print and broadcast media
- to perform such other matters as the Authority may determine to be in the interests of the media and in furtherance of the objects of this Decree.

== Criticism ==
Since its establishment, the Authority has been subject to criticisms by opposition parties and prompted concerns from civil organizations. After the 2014 Fijian general election, the Multinational Observer Group in a report urged the Authority to review its penalties for ethical breaches and reiterated the need for an independent institution to monitor the Authority's actions. In 2017, Fiji was ranked 67 out of 180 countries in the Press Freedom Index by Reporters Without Borders claiming that the media in Fiji is still restricted by the Authority. On 20 June 2019, members of the opposition proposed the removal of the Authority, however the motion was defeated in Parliament. The Fijian Media Association in May 2022 called on the government to examine the "harsh penalties" imposed by the Authority describing it "too excessive and designed to be vindictive and punish the media rather that encourage better reporting standards and be corrective."
