= Moses Driver =

Fijian police officer

Moses Driver is a former Fijian police officer, who served as Deputy Commissioner of Police until he was removed from office in the 2006 Fijian coup d'état.

In 1987 he was the investigating officer in a series of political bombings allegedly carried out by future military regime Attorney-General Aiyaz Sayed-Khaiyum.

A major part of Driver's work was pursuing investigations into the Fiji coup of 2000.

Driver became Acting Police Commissioner on 29 November 2006, when Commissioner Andrew Hughes took a leave of absence during the crisis which culminated in the 2006 Fijian coup d'état. On 4 December the military seized forearms from the police tactical response unit to prevent them from opposing a coup. On 6 December he denounced the coup as a criminal act and refused to cooperate with the military. He was subsequently detained by the military regime and removed from office.
