= Public Service Commission (Fiji) =

Civil service commission of Fiji

Agency overview
- Formed: 1970
- Jurisdiction: Fiji
- Headquarters: New Town Hall Road, Suva
- Minister responsible: Sitiveni Rabuka, Prime Minister of Fiji
- Agency executive: Luke Rokovada, Chairperson
- Parent department: Ministry of Civil Service
- Website: www.psc.gov.fj

The Public Service Commission (PSC) is a statutory agency in Fiji within the Ministry of Civil Service that is responsible for overseeing standards of all civil servants.

Established in 1970 by Fiji's constitution, the Commission is led by a chairperson and consists of not less than three and not more than five members; all appointed by the President of Fiji on the advice of the Constitutional Offices Commission.

== History ==
The Commission was formally established on Fiji's independence by section 104 of the 1970 constitution, with powers to "make appointments to public offices... and to remove and to exercise disciplinary control over persons holding or acting in such offices". The Commission's powers explicitly did not extend to members of the judiciary, the Ombudsman, and members of military or police forces. Further powers of the Commission to review the public service, establish pay gradings, conduct inquiries and summon witnesses were established by the 1974 Public Service Act. The Act also established a Public Service Appeal Board to hear appeals against the Commission's decisions.

Following the 1987 Fijian coups d'état the Commission was continued by section 126 of the new 1990 Constitution of Fiji, but a clause was added stating that "No appeal shall lie against decisions of the Public Service Commission with respect to matters concerning appointments, promotions and transfers". A requirement was also added for the Commission to ensure that each level of each department should consist of not less than 50% indigenous Fijians and not less than 40% of members of other communities.

The 1997 Constitution of Fiji reformed the Commission, grouping it with the Constitutional Offices Commission and Disciplined Services Commission (formerly the Police Services Commission) and establishing a unified appointment procedure for these "independent service commissions". The constitutional provisions were simplified, and the Parliament of Fiji was empowered to legislate providing for appeals. The Public Service (Amendment) Act 1998 restored the Public Service Appeal Board, while the Public Service Act 1999 established statutory Public Service Values and a Public Service Code of Conduct and gave the Commission the function of promoting and upholding them. In late 2003 the Commission moved to a managerial system for the public service, replacing permanent secretaries with chief executives, and giving them performance targets.

In May 2005 a report by Amnesty International found that the Commission was still discriminating against non-Fijians in appointments, and that almost all chief executives were indigenous Fijians. The Commission began an inquiry in August 2006 following further accusations of unconstitutional hiring practices.

In the leadup to the 2006 Fijian coup d'état the Commission clashed repeatedly with military commander (and later dictator) Frank Bainimarama over public service appointments In November 2006 it began an inquiry into chief executives plotting with the military. On 4 December 2006 Commission chair Stuart Huggett stated that the Commission took orders from the elected government, and warned public servants that signing up for a military government was "signing up for a jail term". Following the coup, he was detained by the military, sacked, and forced to leave the country. The Commission's chief executive, Anare Jale, was also fired after refusing to recognise the military regime. Following the coup the Commission sacked all chief executives, cut public service pay, and declared strikes illegal.

Following the abrogation of the 1997 constitution during the 2009 Fijian constitutional crisis, the Commission was re-established by the State Services Decree. It was then continued in the 2013 Constitution of Fiji.

Following the 2022 Fijian general election Commission chair Vishnu Mohan, who was based in Canada and had never been in Fiji to perform his duties, resigned. Four of the five other members also resigned at the request of the incoming coalition government. On 11 January 2023 Luke Rokovada was named as the new chair of the Commission.

== Functions ==
According to section 126 of the 2013 Constitution of Fiji, the function of the Commission includes:

- To appoint permanent secretaries with the agreement of the Prime Minister
- To remove permanent secretaries with the agreement of the Prime Minister
- To institute the disciplinary action against permanent secretaries
- To make such other appointments and perform such other duties, functions and responsibilities as may be prescribed by written law.

=== Permanent secretaries ===
The Commission with the agreement of the Prime Minister, assign permanent secretaries to various government ministries which in turn, the permanent secretaries has the power to appoint, terminate and impose disciplinary action on all civil servants within their respective ministries. With the support of a secretariat from the Ministry of Civil Service, the Commission issues guidelines such as hiring civil servants based on professional merit (Open Merit Based Recruitment) and overseeing the performance of all permanent secretaries.

== Chairs of the Commission ==
- Stuart Huggett (2004 - 2006)
- Hector Hatch (2007)
- Rishi Ram (2007 - 2009)
- Josefa Serulagilagi (2009 - 2015)
- Vishnu Mohan (2015 - 2023)
- Luke Rokovada (2023 - present)
