= Stuart Huggett =

Fijian architect and civil servant (died 2021)

Stuart Huggett (died 10 September 2021) was a British-born Fijian architect, businessman, and civil servant, who served as Chairman of the Public Service Commission from 2004 to 2006, when he was removed from office on 6 December 2006 by the Military junta which had seized power the previous day.

In addition, Huggett was a Director of Architects Pacific Limited, which is based in Suva and in Sydney, Australia and the Honorary Consul for Spain.

Huggett was born in Bath, England. He graduated from the Royal Western England College of Architecture, now the University of Bristol. After his marriage, he spent a year in Zaria, Nigeria, during the Nigerian Civil War in the late 1960s.

He founded Architects Pacific Limited in 1971, which specialized in residential, commercial and tourist resort design and masterplanning. He also organised the Fiji Muroroa Protest in 1995.

== 2006 coup d'état ==
On 6 December 2006 Stuart Huggett, as Chairman of the Public Service Commission, called together a meeting of the CEOs of the various governmental ministries, including Nainendra Nand, the Solicitor-General of Fiji. Military forces broke up the meeting and detained Huggett and Nand, and there were unconfirmed reports that the two had been assaulted. A veiled statement by Australia's Foreign Minister, Alexander Downer, on the ABC television's 7:30 report gave some credence to the rumours.

The Chairman and Solicitor General were served notice of dismissal by the Military Commander, Commodore Frank Bainimarama, on 7 December 2006. However the elected Government of Fiji gave no such notice to any governmental officials.

Announcing the appointment of Hector Hatch as Huggett's successor on 4 January 2007, Commodore Bainimarama said that Huggett had been uncooperative with the Military authorities, and also claimed that he was under investigation for allegations that a company he was connected with had tendered for a F$40 million government contract.

== Personal life ==
Huggett was married to Gillian Margaret Illife, with whom he had three daughters, Catharine, Alexandra and Amitia and a son, James.
