= Interim Cabinet of Fiji =

The interim cabinet of Fiji was appointed in January 2007, following the 2006 Fijian coup d'état.

The coup deposed the Qarase government on 5 December 2006. The coup leader, Commodore Frank Bainimarama reached an agreement with deposed President Ratu Josefa Iloilo whereby Iloilo would be reinstated as president and Bainimarama sworn in as interim Prime Minister. Bainimarama was duly sworn in on 5 January 2007. Eight cabinet ministers were appointed on 8 January and another six on 9 January; a fifteenth, Ratu Epeli Ganilau, was sworn in as Minister for Fijian Affairs on 15 January.

== Initial cabinet ==
Portfolio
Minister
Profile
Prime Minister,
Minister for Information,
Minister for Home Affairs
Commodore Josaia Voreqe (Frank) Bainimarama
Commander, Republic of Fiji Military Forces.
Minister for Finance,
Minister for Sugar Reform,
Minister for National Planning
Mahendra Chaudhry
Fiji Labour Party (FLP) leader; Prime Minister 1999-2000 (deposed).
Minister for Youth and Sports
Lekh Ram Vayeshnoi
FLP politician since 1992; former Cabinet Minister.
Minister for Local Government,
Minister for Urban Development
Ratu Jone Navakamocea
State Minister for National Planning in the deposed SDL-led government.
Minister for Labour,
Minister for Tourism
Bernadette Rounds Ganilau
Served as one of two United Peoples Party parliamentarians in 2006. Former Tourism Minister (2000-2001).
Minister for Lands and Mineral Resources
Tevita Vuibau
Marine geologist with a background as Principal Scientific Officer with the Mineral Resources Department.
Minister for Agriculture, Fisheries, and Forests
Jainend Kumar
Retired Director of Research with the Agriculture, Sugar, and Land Resettlement Ministry.
Attorney-General,
Minister for Justice
Aiyaz Sayed-Khaiyum
Former President of Fiji Young Lawyers Association.
Minister for Foreign Affairs
Minister for External Trade
Ratu Epeli Nailatikau
Former Military Commander, diplomat, Cabinet Minister, and Parliamentary Speaker (2001-2006). Son of high chief and prominent politician, Ratu Sir Edward Cakobau; son-in-law of first Prime Minister and former President, Ratu Sir Kamisese Mara.
Minister for Public Service,
Minister for Public Service Reform
Poseci Bune
Veteran civil servant and diplomat; FLP Environment Minister in the deposed government. Estranged from party leader Mahendra Chaudhry.
Minister for Health
Jona Senilagakali
Military doctor and former diplomat; interim Prime Minister for one month after coup of 5 December 2006.
Minister for Education
Lieutenant Commander Netani Sukanaivalu
Reserve naval officer, former Fiji Institute of Technology lecturer, and businessman. National Alliance Party (NAPF) candidate in 2006 election.
Minister for Transport
Manu Korovulavula
Longtime civil servant and former Senator; NAPF treasurer and candidate in 2006 election.
Minister for Commerce
Taito Waradi
Businessman and President, Fiji Chamber of Commerce.
Minister for Women,
Minister for Social Welfare
Adi Laufitu Malani
Scion of the chiefly Gonesau clan of Nakorotubu, Ra Province; former regional director of the United Nations Development Fund for Women.
Minister for Fijian Affairs
Ratu Epeli Ganilau
Scion of the chiefly Ai Sokula clan; son of first President Ratu Sir Penaia Ganilau and son-in-law of first Prime Minister and second President, Ratu Sir Kamisese Mara.
- FLP: Fiji Labour Party
- NAPF: National Alliance Party of Fiji
- SDL: Soqosoqo Duavata ni Lewenivanua
- UPP: United Peoples Party
