= Pacnews =

Pacnews is a regional news agency and international wire service headquartered in Suva, Fiji. Pacnews is operated as a service of the Pacific Island News Association (PINA), a regional organization composed of journalists and news organizations in the Pacific Islands region. Pacnews is sometimes written as PACNEWS.

Pacnews announced that it would no longer cover domestic Fijian news in its stories following a crackdown on the media in Fiji in the aftermath of the 2009 Fijian constitutional crisis. The announcement followed government demands that Pacnews remove a story about the UN Security Council's condemnation of the abolishment of the Fijian constitution by President Josefa Iloilo on April 10, 2009. Fijian government censors also demanded that Pacnews screen all Pacnews bulletins and news feeds concerning Fiji through the government before being sent to subscribers abroad. Pacnews refused to comply with the Fijian government's censorship demands and instead decided to discontinue all news stories on Fiji.

On April 15, 2009, Pacnews writer and journalist Pita Ligaiula, who is also a foreign correspondent for the Australian Associated Press, was arrested by two police officers and an official from the Fijian Ministry of Information. Ligaiula' detention was reportedly due to a byline he had written which violated Fiji's emergency restrictions on the media.

The restrictions on Pacnews have led to calls to leave Fiji due to censorship. However, the President of PINA, Joseph Ealedona of Papua New Guinea, reiterated that Pacnews has no plans to relocate to another country at this time. Ealedona said that it was important that Pacnews and PINA remain in Fiji, even under the current government restrictions saying, "I think it is very important that PINA remains there and does not show to the interim regime that we are running away. The media in Fiji needs PINA there. As far as the situation continues like that we will remain there."

However, Ealedonia left open the possibility that PINA would consider moving its Pacnews service and its headquarters out of Fiji at its conference in July 2009.
