= List of ambassadors of Fiji to the United States =

Coordinates: 38.905233°N 77.045313°W

Ambassador of Fiji to the United States
- Incumbent; Winston Thompson since May 20, 2009
- Inaugural holder: Semesa Sikivou
- Formation: July 22, 1971

The Fijian ambassador in Washington, D. C. is the official representative of the Government in Suva to the Government of the United States.

== List of representatives ==
Diplomatic agrément	Diplomatic accreditation	Ambassador	Observations	Prime Minister of Fiji	List of presidents of the United States	Term end
June 17, 1971	July 22, 1971	Semesa Sikivou	Resident in New York	Kamisese Mara	Richard Nixon	
September 2, 1976	November 18, 1976	Berenado Vunibobo		Kamisese Mara	Gerald Ford	
July 28, 1980	August 29, 1980	Filipe Bole		Kamisese Mara	Jimmy Carter	
June 14, 1983		Filimone Jitoko	Chargé d'affaires	Kamisese Mara	Ronald Reagan	
August 25, 1983	October 13, 1983	Ratu Jone Filipe Radrodro		Kamisese Mara	Ronald Reagan	
November 22, 1986	Abdul Hameec Yusuf	Chargé d'affaires	Kamisese Mara			
July 1, 1990		Finau Mara	Chargé d'affaires	Kamisese Mara	George H. W. Bush	
January 27, 1992	March 11, 1992	Pita Kewa Nacuva		Sitiveni Rabuka	George H. W. Bush	
February 5, 1997	February 11, 1997	Napolioni Masirewa		Sitiveni Rabuka	Bill Clinton	
November 26, 2001	December 12, 2001	Anare Jale		Laisenia Qarase	George W. Bush	
August 16, 2005	October 3, 2005	Jesoni Vitusagavulu		Laisenia Qarase	George W. Bush	
April 20, 2009	May 20, 2009	Winston Thompson		Frank Bainimarama	Barack Obama	
