= Qoliqoli Bill =

2006 Fijian legislation on rights to beaches, lagoons and reefs

The Qoliqoli Bill was a piece of legislation proposed in Fiji in 2006. The bill proposed to transfer proprietary rights of qoliqoli areas (beach, lagoon and reef) from the State of Fiji to the qoliqoli owners, who are Fijians. Others such as hotel owners would be required to make payments to the ethnic Fijians holding the rights. The government of Fiji described it as being of relevance "particularly the Fijian community".

== Government justification ==
In introducing the bill, the Minister for Fijian Affairs, Lands and Provincial Development, Ratu Naiqama Lalabalavu, defended it on historical basis. Lalabalavu said the expectations by the Fijian chiefs over their traditional customary qoliqoli rights has been there for a period of about 125 years. During the Cessions in 1874, some Fijian chiefs asked Sir Hercules Robinson: "We would like His Excellency to make clear to us what our position would be (in the event of Cession taking place) with regards to our fishing and forest rights. We are confident that His Excellency will give us the kindest consideration."

The bill provides for the establishment of a mutually agreed framework between commercial operators including hoteliers and the Qoliqoli owners together with the Commission. This will bring financial benefits such as fishing licences and monies payable to qoliqoli owners.

== Reactions to the bill ==
Sukhdev Shah, an Indo-Fijian lecturer in economics with the University of the South Pacific writes:

"In short, the Qoliqoli Bill and its companion, the Lands Tribunal threaten the livelihoods of Fiji's half of wage-earning and salaried work force, whereas there are very few options for creating substitute employment.

"Then, if the Qoliqoli Bill has such deleterious consequences - even ignoring the human rights issue of depriving a large segment of country's population from access to essential amenities of life - why would then the international community, or any one with Fiji's well-being at heart, voice support for a person or government who is-hell-bent on spearheading the passage of the Bill, while demeaning the intent of the one who is having the courage to stand-up against such an evil?"

Duncan Wilson writes:

"Investors warn that misinformation, inadequate consultation and resource provisions in the qoliqoli bill could cripple tourism, Fiji's greatest money-maker.

"Villagers' misunderstanding of their fishing rights and the bill have already harmed the industry, they claim.

"In November 2004, villagers claiming fishing rights and ownership over the Narara Reef area in the Yasawa Islands in western Fiji, a prime cruising and resort location, intimidated two tourists and stole their diving equipment."

The bill is said to be intended to further erode the rights of ethnic Indo-Fijians. BBC quotes a businessman Ashneel Singh:

"Many of us Indians support the military commander and many of the indigenous Fijians support the democracy. But Indians had serious problems with the proposals put forward by the democratically elected Prime Minister Laisenia Qarase.
He wanted to allocate the ownership of coastal land to the indigenous Fijians.

We believe that God has given three things for free: the land the wind and the sea. I don't think Qarase should have taken the land and just given it to the Fijians. What would be left for the Indian community?"

Fiji's deputy opposition leader Bernadette Rounds Ganilau said the bill was a joke because a large mass of land is lying idle in the country while Fiji continues to import food valued at over 180-million US dollars. Thousands upon thousands of vacant and re-possessed land is not being used, making Fiji the world's largest producer of weeds and grass. She said the Qoliqoli Bill is a joke because Fiji imports over 13-million US dollars' worth of prawns every year and most of it is from Kerala in India. The country imports 46% of its tuna which is then processed and exported as Fiji tuna.

The Finance Ministry defended the bill stating that more ethnic Fijian participation in the eco-tourism sector would boost rural development. It said the Native Land Trust Board's tourism policy and management of the implementation of the proposed Qoliqoli Bill was critical to the sustainability of the tourism industry and resource owner participation.

== See also ==
- Indo-Fijian
