= 2009 Fijian constitutional crisis =

Abrogation of the constitution by President Josefa Iloilo

In April 2009, Fiji underwent a constitutional crisis when the Court of Appeal ruled that the 2006 Fijian coup d'état had been illegal. The Court dismissed the Interim Cabinet led by Prime Minister Frank Bainimarama that had governed Fiji since the coup. However, President Josefa Iloilo announced on a nationwide radio broadcast that he was abrogating the Constitution. He dismissed all judges and constitutional appointees, and reinstated Bainimarama and his cabinet. He also instituted emergency rule which increased police powers and allowed media censorship.

== Background ==
On Thursday, 9 April 2009, the Court of Appeal, the second highest in Fiji, issued a ruling stating the illegality of the 2006 Fijian coup d'état, which removed the government of Laisenia Qarase from power, replacing it with military rule. The court also called the interim government established in January 2007 "invalid." The ruling legally dissolved the current parliament.

The Court of Appeals ordered President Iloilo to appoint a "distinguished person" to act as a caretaker Prime Minister and oversee the dissolution of parliament. The court further ordered that Iloilo was forbidden from appointing either current Prime Minister Frank Bainimarama or former Prime Minister Laisenia Qarase as the caretaker.

The Court of Appeals ruling "prompted" the Prime Minister to step down from power. Iloilo had sworn Bainimarama into office in January 2007. Bainimarama immediately reverted to his former position as army commander. His cabinet also resigned after the court's ruling.

== Suspension of Constitution ==
President Iloilo issued a statement the following day saying, "I hereby confirm I have abrogated the 1997 constitution and appointed myself as head of state in the new order." Iloilo immediately assumed all political power in the country.

In his statement, Iloilo fired the Fijian judiciary and nullified all judicial appointments. He stated that "All judicial appointments are no longer in place. New appointments are to be made for judges, magistrates and other judicial officers. I will soon be inviting suitable individuals to join or rejoin the bench under the new order." He also decreed that all existing laws would remain in place.

Iloilo announced that Fiji would hold democratic elections in September 2014 "at the latest." He also promised to appoint an interim prime minister. To that end, he issued a decree which allowed him to appoint a Prime Minister by decree. Parliament had not met since the 2006 coup. He subsequently re-appointed Frank Bainimarama as the "new" Interim prime minister. Bainimarama later reinstalled all of his previous Cabinet members to their same positions. In a 17 April speech to civil servants Bainimarama announced that his government was not an interim one and that elections would not be held before 2014: "A new Legal Order means there is no longer the old. There is no need to speculate as to what happened, how it happened, what should have happened or what should not have happened. What is, is now, and the future." Iloilo's announcement of a new judiciary clarified that the abrogation of the constitution would not be subject to any judicial review.

Fiji was placed under a "Public Emergency Regulation", putting the country under emergency rule for 30 days. This regulation gave the police the right "to control the movement of people" and to stop any broadcast or publication it deemed "could cause disorder, promote disaffection or public alarm or undermine the government or state of Fiji". On some key roads, police had established roadblocks but the military was not involved. Police "postponed" any assemblies of more than 100 people and revoked permits already issued including the annual meeting of the Fiji Nursing Association and perhaps the elections of the Fiji Teachers Union. In July, the annual Methodist general meeting was not given a permit. Several Methodist Church leaders and a village high chief who was providing space for the meeting were arrested and released on condition that they not appear in public. The Methodist annual meeting scheduled for August was later cancelled by church leadership.

All positions established under the 1997 Constitution were held to be vacant. In the following days, some of these office holders were reinstalled into the same offices, including the Commissioner of Police, the Commissioner of Prisons, the Commander of the RFMF, the Solicitor General. Others were not reappointed as in the case of the Governor of the Reserve Bank of Fiji who was replaced by the Deputy Governor. Other positions were not immediately refilled, such as the courts, the Constitutional Offices Commission, the Judicial Service Commission, the Disciplined Services Commission and the Human Rights Commission.

On 31 July, President Iloilo, 88 years old and thought to be ill, retired after having served since 2000 through all the coups, except for one month in 2006 when Bainimarama gave himself Presidential powers. Iloilo was replaced by the vice-president, Brigadier-General Ratu Epeli Nailatikau, a former military commander. Under the 1997 Constitution, the President was supposed to be appointed by the Great Council of Chiefs, but with the Constitution suspended, Bainimarama announced that a replacement would be appointed by himself and his Cabinet at a time suitable for the regime.

== Economy ==
As well as the rest of the world, Fiji had been influenced by the 2008 financial crisis before the constitutional crisis began. Fiji's foreign currency reserves had fallen by 1/3 during 2008 and, in February 2009, Standard and Poor's downgraded Fiji's long term credit rating from stable to negative. Exports increased in 2008 and inflation declined; however, cashflow suffered from the 2008 financial crisis and imports increased leading to a larger negative balance of trade.

After the constitutional crisis began, the Governor of the Reserve Bank of Fiji was removed from his position, as were all other people appointed to positions under the 1997 Constitution. The Reserve Bank quickly made several major moves, imposing currency exchange restrictions and devaluing the currency by 20% to benefit exporters and tourism. On 16 April, the Bank ordered Australian banks operating in Fiji to limit interest rates and institute microlending programs. Standard and Poor's lowered Fiji's credit rating on 16 April, with short term credit falling to a C from a B rating. On 21 April, Moody's lowered Fiji's government bond, foreign currency bank deposit and foreign currency bond ratings, into junk bond status.

In a move claimed to be aimed at cutting public corruption, Bainimarama announced "As a first up, from next week, all government vehicles being driven after hours will need to carry permits." Soldiers and police would be empowered to check for these permits.

As a cost-cutting measure, the mandatory retirement age for civil servants was reduced to 55, with 30 April 2009 set as the retirement day for any over that age. Since 2007, the Fiji Teacher Association had been fighting the order to lower the retirement age from 60 to 55; the Public Service Association had later joined as a party to the lawsuit. Certain high-level positions were given a retirement age of 65, including the position of Commander of the Military Forces held by Bainimarama who will turn 55 three days before the decree goes into effect. The decree was expected to force the retirement of over 800 teachers and about 100 nurses. (Another 40 nurses had already moved overseas during 2009 before the decree.)

== Suppression of the media ==
Reports indicated that as part of the Emergency Regulation "a Ministry of Information officer and a plain-clothed policeman would be stationed in every newsroom". The Permanent Secretary of the Department of Information explained the policy, saying that media are to "refrain from publishing and broadcasting any news item that is negative in nature, relating to the assumption of executive authority on 10 April...and the subsequent appointments..." Immediately after the decree as a form of protest, Fiji One TV did not run its evening news program and the Fiji Times went to press with large blank spaces where censored articles were removed. The Fiji Sun announced that it would no longer run any political stories of any sort. The Fiji Daily Post mocked the restrictions, publishing stories under "Man gets on bus" and "Breakfast as usual".

On 13 April two of the last remaining foreign journalists in Fiji were called to Government House by the Ministry of Information. ABC Pacific Correspondent Sean Dorney was asked to voluntarily leave Fiji—which he refused citing his valid visa—and TV3 reporter Sia Aston's footage was confiscated by Fijian authorities. Both Dorney and Aston were deported from Fiji on 14 April, with Aston and TV3 cameraman Matt Smith banned from ever returning to Fiji, with the interim Government stating that all three had breached their visa conditions. Edwin Nand, a local journalist for Fiji TV, was imprisoned for 36 hours after he interviewed Dorney. Fijian Military spokesman Neumi Leweni stated that foreign journalists were welcome in Fiji, but must first apply and that "the invitation is decidedly conditional." However, during an interview with Radio New Zealand, Bainimarama said it was not necessary for their reporter to visit Fiji: "You just ask me the questions, I will give you the answers." On 17 April, military spokesman Neumi Leweni said foreign media personnel would have to apply to his office for visas and approval would be "based on how they have reported about Fiji in the past, if they have, or on the undertaking that they will report accurately and responsibly."

Fijian media outlets and journalists have also come under government scrutiny. There were rumours of the imminent deportation of Anne Fussell, the publisher of the Fiji Times newspaper. Three newspaper editors had been deported in the 14 months before the crisis. Fijian journalists working for international media outlets have also been called before the military to explain reports.

The Government has also shut down two ABC FM transmitters, meaning that both ABC and Radio New Zealand International are only available to Fiji via the shortwave service. Internet cafes have also become a target because of independent news bloggers, with many having to shut down. Networks, software and archives are inspected by government officials, with Commodore Bainimarama saying that free speech "causes trouble" and must be curbed in order for the Government to carry out reforms.

The Pacnews wire service announced they will no longer cover Fiji stories after police and censors required them to remove a story on the UN statements about the crisis. The announcement followed the detention of journalist Pita Ligaiula, a writer for Pacnews and correspondent for the Australian Associated Press, who was arrested by two police officers and an official for the Ministry of Information on 15 April 2009. Matai Akauola, of the Pacific Islands News Association, reported that one of Ligaiula's bylines may have violated Fiji's current media restrictions. Pacnews has announced that it has no plans to relocate from its headquarters in Suva, Fiji, to another country due to the restrictions on reporting Fijian domestic news.

In 2010 the military regime promulgated the Media Industry Development Decree 2010 to permanently control the media.

== Local political reaction ==
The Soqosoqo Duavata ni Lewenivanua party declared that the suspension of the constitution was another coup. The National Federation Party also condemned the President's actions. The Fiji Labour Party said that the country could not sustain a five-year wait for elections and urged elections to be called sooner.

== International reaction ==
The UN Secretary General called for the "restoration of a legitimate government". The U.S. spoke of "deep disappointment" and Australia called the situation "grave and unwelcome". New Zealand's Foreign Minister referred to the situation as "a sorry recipe that has been tried by dictators in a number of other countries, always with tragic consequences." New Zealand Prime Minister John Key said that "the reality is that unless there is some miraculous turn around of events, Fiji is going to be suspended by the [Pacific Islands] forum in roughly two weeks," and that he would back immediate action. The forum's chair, Niue's Premier Toke Talagi, also advocated immediate suspension.

Samoan Prime Minister Tuilaepa Sailele took a particularly strong stance, saying "But one day soon the puppets will grow a brain and see Frank for the evil puppeteer he really is. It is then the curtains will fall on Frank..The whole thing is a political charade and the whole world is watching. Nobody is fooled and no one is laughing. Frank is only fooling himself..Go put back on his military uniform or..maybe, he’d look better in a prison uniform."

The United Nations Security Council issued a statement: "The members of the Security Council are deeply concerned about the situation in Fiji, where undemocratic decisions were made, including the abrogation of the constitution. The members of the Security Council express hopes that Fiji will make a steadfast advancement towards democracy and that fair elections will be held as soon as possible." The United Nations also said that it would not increase the number of Fijian police or soldiers involved in its peacekeeping operations, or deploy them on any future missions, although it would continue to use them in its existing operations.

On 1 May, the Pacific Islands Forum suspended Fiji's membership as they had threatened months before if Fiji had not scheduled elections by that date. The 2009 suspension marked the first time that a country had been suspended from the Pacific Islands Forum in the history of the 38-year-old organization. As part of its suspensions, Fiji was also excluded from the discussions on the Pacific Agreement on Closer Economic Relations (PACER) and the Pacific Free Trade Agreement (PICTA).

The Commonwealth of Nations suspended Fiji from its councils. In August, the Commonwealth gave Fiji until 1 September to announce scheduled elections to occur no later than October 2010. Failing that, Fiji would be "fully suspended" from the Commonwealth, a threat that was carried out when no such announcement was made.

Australia and New Zealand suspended diplomatic relations in 2009. Full diplomatic relations were restored on 30 July 2012.

== Aftermath ==
In March 2012 the military regime announced that a new constitution would be developed by a constitutional commission and debated and approved by a constituent assembly. The commission was sworn in in July 2012, and proceeded to hear evidence, but the regime rejected the Commission's draft in January 2013. It subsequently imposed the draconian Political Parties Decree 2013 to forcibly disband opposition political parties and limit new ones, before scrapping the constituent assembly process and producing its own draft constitution in March 2013. This was eventually imposed on the people of Fiji by decree as the 2013 Constitution of Fiji in September 2013.

In March 2014 Bainimarama announced that elections under the new constitution would take place in September that year. He immediately announced that he would form a new political party, FijiFirst, to contest them. The 2014 Fijian general election was held on 17 September 2014, and resulted in FijiFirst winning 32 of 50 seats in the new Parliament of Fiji and forming a government which was effectively a continuation of the military regime.
