= Rishi Ram =

Fijian civil servant and former diplomat

Rishi Ram (born 17 August 1947) is a Fijian civil servant and former diplomat of Indian descent. From 2007 to 2009 he was Chairman of the Public Service Commission. He was the first ethnic Indian to head the PSC.

Ram served as Deputy Secretary of the PSC from June 1990 to April 1993. He was Secretary for Women and Multi-Ethnic Affairs from 1993 to 1994, and for Urban Housing and Development from 1994 to 2001, when he served briefly as Ambassador to Japan, until 2002. He served again as Secretary for Women from 2002 to 2004.

== Early life ==
Ram was born in Ba in 1952 and attended St Teresa's Primary School and Khalsa Secondary School. In 1966 he moved to Suva and started his public service career as a clerical officer with the Ministry of Primary Industries. He started studying for his Bachelor of Arts degree from the University of the South Pacific in 1985, as a part-time student and graduated in 1995, majoring in management and sociology. He is married to Sarla and has two daughters and a son.
