= Kevueli Bulamainaivalu =

Fijian police officer

Kevueli Bulamainaivalu is a Fijian police officer, who held the position of Assistant Commissioner of Police - Crime, before he was dismissed following the military coup that took place on 5 December 2006.

Before the coup Bulamainaivalu was tasked with investigating the Fiji coup of 2000.
