= New Nationalist Party (Fiji) =

- Founded: 2001
- Ideology: Christian democracy; Christian right; Fijian nationalism; Neoconservatism; Until 2006: Anti-Indian sentiment
- Political position: Right-wing to far-right

The New Nationalist Party was a Fijian political party with a strongly nationalist platform, arguing for the paramountcy of indigenous Fijian interests and of the Christian faith, professed by the great majority of indigenous Fijians but relatively few Indo-Fijians, who comprise some 38 percent of the country's population. The party, a splinter from the Nationalist Vanua Tako Lavo Party, was registered on 1 June 2001 and claimed to be the heir to the legacy of the late Sakeasi Butadroka and the Fiji Nationalist Party.

In a surprise announcement on 20 January 2006, the party announced that it was dropping its demand for the repatriation of Indo-Fijians to India. Citizens of Indian descent would now be welcome to join the party, said party President Saula Telawa, and to contest the forthcoming election under its banner - provided that they were Christians. Aspiring candidates would need to submit references from a Fijian chief and their local pastor, to prove that they had been born-again Christians for a minimum period of three years, Telawa told the Fiji Sun.

In January 2013 the military regime promulgated new regulations governing the registration of political parties, requiring all parties to have at least 5,000 members. All existing parties had to re-register under the new regulations. The party was not one of the two to re-register, and as a result was wound up and its assets forfeited to the state.
