= Nainendra Nand =

Nainendra Nand was the Solicitor-General of Fiji from 1997 to 2006. He had previously worked in the Office of the Attorney-General since 1983. He was dismissed from office on 7 December 2006 for refusing to cooperate with the military junta which seized power on 5 December.

Nand was educated in the United Kingdom. After receiving his LLB from the University of North London, he went on to complete an LLM from the University of London, and was admitted to the bar at Lincoln's Inn.

In his capacity as Solicitor-General, Nand was the Chief Executive Officer for the office of the Attorney-General, the Fiji Law Reform Commission, the Fiji Law Revision Commission, the Legal Aid Commission, and a total of nine boards and committees. In addition, he was Chairman of the Costs Review Committee, a member of the Board of Legal Education, and a legal adviser to the Reserve Bank of Fiji, and a member of the Hotel and Guest Houses Licensing Board and the boards of the IKA Corporation, the Fiji Broadcasting Corporation, and the Maritime and Ports Authority of Fiji.

Nand has lectured in Commercial Law at the University of the South Pacific. He is the co-author of Judicial Review Applications in Fiji, published in 2001.

He currently works at the University of the South Pacific. His wife Vineeta Nand is the Press and Public Affairs Adviser with the British High Commission in Suva.
