= Royal Suva Yacht Club =

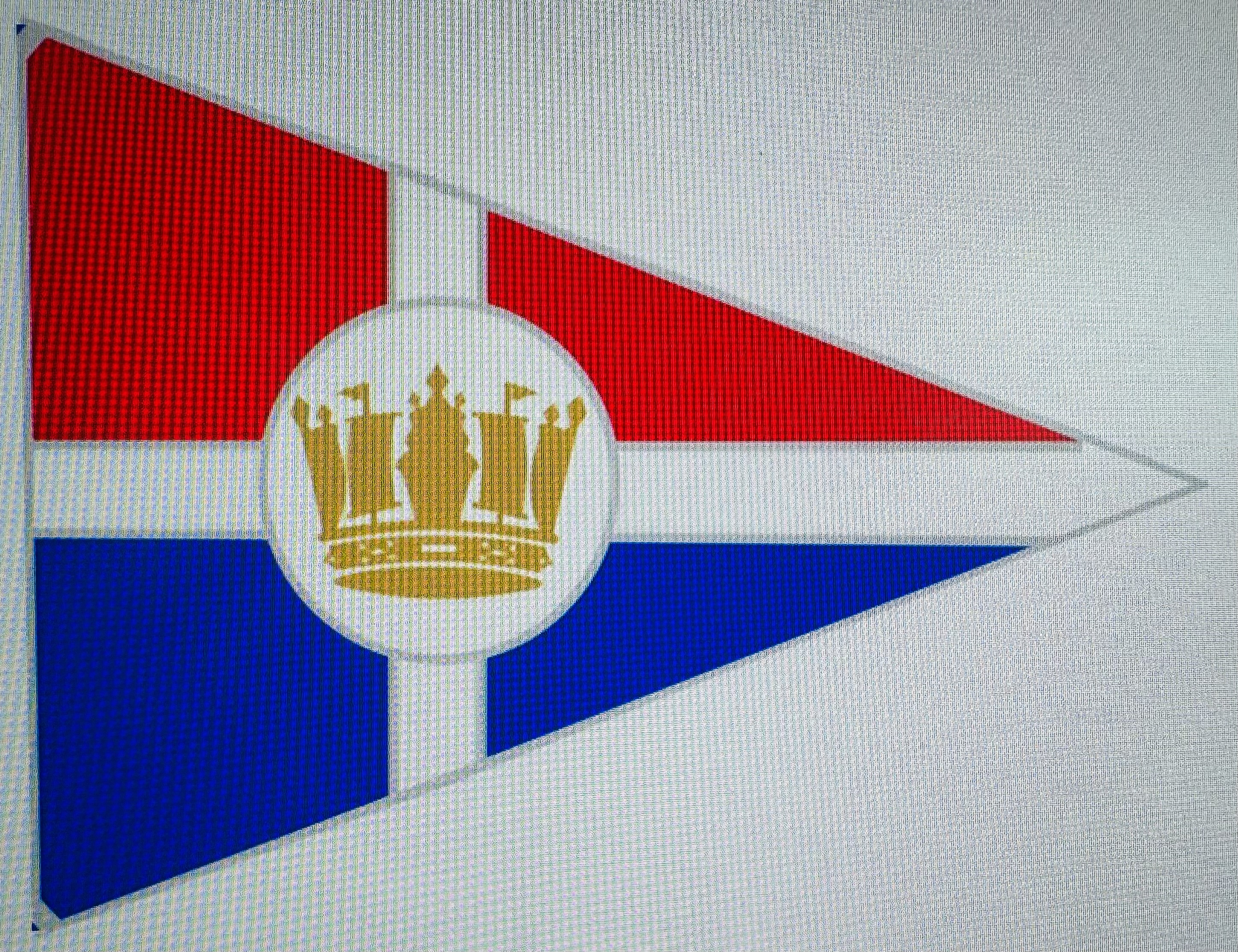
- Abbreviation: RSYC
- Formation: 1932
- Legal status: Active
- Location: Foster Road, Suva, Fiji Islands.
- Coordinates: 18.122980°S 178.430084°E
- Website: www.fijimarinas.com/royal-suva-yacht-club-rsyc

Royal Suva Yacht Club is a Fijian yacht club, located in Walu Bay, Suva, Fiji.

The yacht club was originally established in 1932, as the Suva Yacht Club, located between Stinson Jetty and Nubukalou Creek along Suva's foreshore before the land was reclaimed. The first flag officers at the club were Commodore T. M. McGuire, Vice Commodore E. E. McGowan and Rear Commodore F. Reay. The club had an initial membership of approximately 20, with six to eight boats of various sizes. The first official race was held on 22 October 1932, with the first cruising race held on 17 January 1933 from Suva to Nukulau (10 km (6.2 mi) west of Suva) and the first regatta was held at Levuka in August 1933. In June 1935 the first overseas yachts visited the club. Construction of a new site in Walu Bay commenced in September 1937 but wasn't completed until August 1948. The title of 'Royal' was granted by Sir Allan Lascelles, Secretary to King George VI in 1950.

In 1952 the club hosted the second 18ft Skiff World Championships (J. J. Giltinan Championships), with ten boats competing.

In 1956 the first Auckland to Sydney yacht race was held with 13 entries, in conjunction with the Royal Akarana Yacht Club. The winner Wanderer completed the race in 11 days 12 hours 26 minutes. In all there have been fifteen races to Suva: 1956, 1966, 1969, 1973 (70 yachts), 1977 (which had a record number of 117 entries received), 1979, 1981, 1983, 1985, 1987, 1989, 1991, 1993, 1995, 1997, 1998, 1999, 2000, 2001, 2005, 2006, 2010, 2014 and 2016 (where Team Vodophone Racing set a race record of 2 days 11 hours 31 minutes.

The 2000 race was abandoned at the request of Prime Minister of New Zealand, Helen Clark, as a result of the 2000 Fijian coup d'état.

The inaugural Sydney to Suva yacht race was held in 1976, jointly hosted by the Middle Harbour Yacht Club and the Royal Suva Yacht Club. The biennial event was run until 1982. The first two races were held without a sponsor and the last two were sponsored by Tooheys Brewery. In the 1982 Sydney to Suva Yacht Race, seventeen yachts competed for a $4,000 trophy. The race was won by Challenge skippered by Lou Abrahams from the Sandringham Yacht Club in 10 days 17 hours 32 minutes.
