= The Fiji Times =

Fijian daily English-language newspaper

- “Your Voice Since 1869”

- Front page on September 16, 2011. The main headline is Fiji's participation in the 2011 Rugby World Cup.
- Type: Daily newspaper
- Format: Tabloid
- Owner: Motibhai Group of Companies
- Founder: George Littleton Griffiths
- Editor-in-chief: Fred Wesley
- General manager: Christine Lyons
- Founded: September 4, 1869; 157 years ago
- Language: English (primary), Fijian
- Headquarters: 177 Victoria Parade, Suva, Fiji
- Country: Fiji
- Circulation: 72,993 (as of 2010)
- Sister newspapers: Nai Lalakai (iTaukei), Shanti Dut (Hindi), Kaila (ceased publication)
- Website: www.fijitimes.com

Logo of Fiji Times Online in 2005

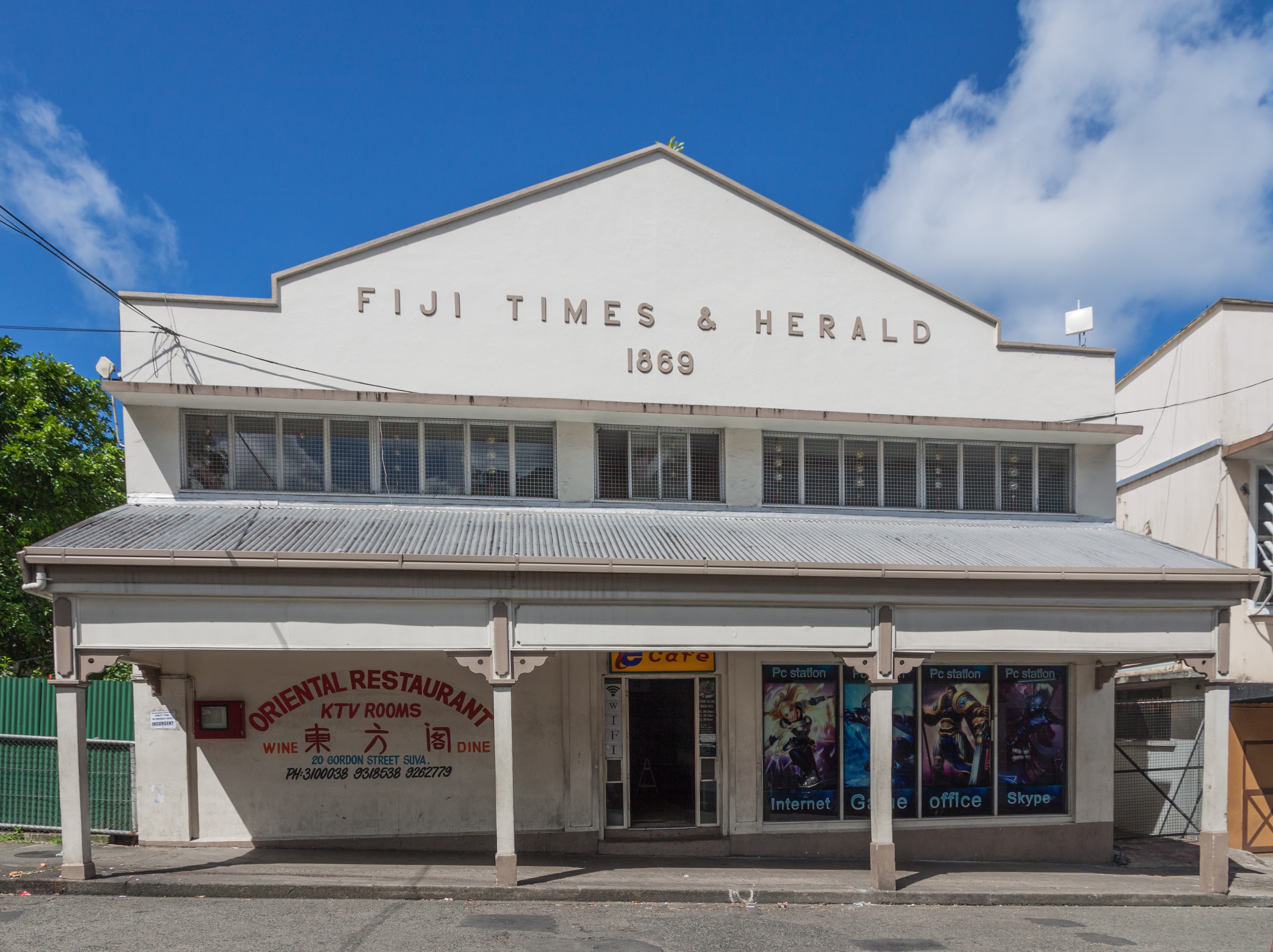
Fiji Times building

The Fiji Times is a daily English-language newspaper published in Suva, Fiji. Established in Levuka on 4 September 1869 by George Littleton Griffiths, it is Fiji's oldest newspaper still operating.

The Fiji Times is owned by Motibhai Group, which purchased it from Rupert Murdoch's News Corp on 22 September 2010 due to the enactment of the Media Industry Development Act 2010. The Fiji Times Limited board is chaired by Kirit Patel (as of 2010), and includes Rajesh Patel, a resident director appointed in 2010 and Jinesh Patel, Director for the Motibhai Group.

The former publisher Evan Hannah, an Australian citizen, was forcibly removed from Fiji in 2008 as he was accused by the interim Frank Bainimarama government of meddling in Fijian politics.

An online edition is published, featuring local news, sport and weather.

The Fiji Times also publishes The Sunday Times and the weekly Fijian vernacular newspaper Nai Lalakai.

== History ==
Two editions of the Fiji Times manufactured from bark-cloth are held at the Auckland Museum. The editions, from July 4, 1908 and February 17, 1909, provide an insight into the production of newspapers in the colonial era in the tropical Pacific. The editions are printed on a single white laminate bark cloth, also known as masi in Fiji, and was of a standard width requiring no trimming to fit in the press. Sometimes, the left or right sides were fringed by cutting the sheet to a depth of around 20mm. These editions are some of about a dozen known examples of bark cloth newspapers worldwide.

=== Title history ===
Approximate dates	Issue numbering	Titling
29 October 1881 – 29 December 1886	No. 1 - no. 453	Suva Times
4 September 1869 – 18 May 1918	No. 1 - Vol. 14, no. 2981	Fiji Times First published in Levuka, Fiji. From 1887 published in Suva, Fiji.
20 May 1918 – 11 June 1918	Vol. 14, no. 2982 - Vol. 14, no. 3000	The Fiji Times and Western Pacific Herald (merged from Fiji Times and Western Pacific Herald). The Western Pacific Herald had been published 1901-1935.
12 June 1918 – 28 April 1956	Vol. 14, no. 3001 - unknown	The Fiji Times and Herald
30 April 1956 – present	New series, Vol. 1, no. 1 -	Fiji Times

== Coups and censorship ==
The Rabuka administration censored the Fiji Times for a while following the first military coup of 14 May 1987. In protest, the newspaper published an edition with large blank spaces, where articles censored by the military would have been placed.

The Fiji Times announced on 5 December 2006, in the wake of the overthrow of the civilian government by the military, that it was suspending publication rather than bow to government censorship. Military officers had visited the premises that evening to prohibit the publication of any "propaganda" in support of the deposed government of Prime Minister Laisenia Qarase. The online edition would be continuing publication as normal, however. Just before midday on 6 December, the military granted permission for the Times to resume publication without censorship.

The Times reported on 9 December that two members of the public had been detained and questioned by the Military over letters they had written to the Times editor during the week, and were given a "verbal warning."

Nonetheless, from December 2006 to April 2009, the Times was able to publish continuously articles critical of the interim government. The latter voiced its displeasure, but did not impose censorship. Following the 2009 Fijian constitutional crisis, however, all Fiji's media were censored, including the Fiji Times. Censors are present in the paper's newsrooms. The newspaper's chief editor Netani Rika told Radio New Zealand International that "his journalists continue to cover every story in detail as if they were working in a democratic country without restrictions. And he says they challenge the censors by putting every possible news item before them." The website of the Fiji Times has also been censored since April 2009.

== Criticism ==
The Fiji Labour Party was once highly critical of the Fiji Times, accusing it of political bias. In July 2008, the party published a report alleging that the Fiji Times had collaborated with others in a deliberate effort to unseat the 1999/2000 Labour-led government.

== See also ==
- Culture of Fiji
- List of newspapers in Fiji
