= Andrew Hughes (police officer) =

Australian police chief (1956–2018)

Andrew Hughes APM
- Born: Andrew Charles Hughes; 6 June 1956; Wythall, England, United Kingdom
- Died: 28 August 2018 (aged 62); Cairns, Queensland, Australia
- Occupation: police officer

Andrew Charles Hughes APM (6 June 1956 – 28 August 2018) was an Australian police officer of the Australian Federal Police (AFP) who served as the Chief Police Officer (CPO) for the Australian Capital Territory (ACT) and the Head of the United Nations Police Division. The CPO position is similar to the role of Australian Commissioners of Police, that is, the chief executive of the ACT Policing component of the AFP. ACT Policing forms one of the larger operating components of Australia's national policing agency, the Australian Federal Police. He was also Commissioner of Police in Fiji from 2003 to 2006. Hughes died of bowel cancer in 2018, aged 62.

== Early Australian Federal Police career ==
Hughes served as an Assistant Commissioner of the AFP, holding the position of Deputy Chief Police Officer of the Australian Capital Territory. Prior to this appointment, Hughes was the General Manager of International and Federal Operations.

== Fijian Police Commissioner ==
The AFP nominated Hughes for the role of Fiji Commissioner of Police following a request by the Fijian Constitutional Officers Committee. Under the Fijian constitution, the office of Police Commissioner need not be held by a citizen, and in the wake of the Fiji coup of 2000, in which the elected government of Prime Minister Mahendra Chaudhry was deposed, it was thought that a non-citizen would be better able to present an image of fairness and impartiality in the prosecution of coup-related cases. His predecessor, Isikia Savua, had been accused by the former President, Ratu Sir Kamisese Mara, of complicity in it. Ratu Sir Kamisese resigned (allegedly under pressure from the military and police) in the midst of the coup.

Since 2003, Hughes vigorously pursued investigations against high-profile citizens in connection with the events of 2000. His targets included chiefs and politicians, including some government Ministers. His relationship with the government was at times strained, and he periodically clashed with the Home Affairs Minister, Josefa Vosanibola. His areas of disagreement with the government included the controversial Reconciliation, Tolerance, and Unity Bill, which proposed to establish a Commission empowered to compensate victims and pardon perpetrators of the coup; Hughes expressed serious reservations about the amnesty provisions. He also opposed government attempts to cap expenditure by the police and the Military.

Hughes announced on 16 February 2006 that with his term due to expire in 2007, he would stay on if requested. Otherwise, there were four senior officers, all Fiji citizens, who were qualified to succeed him, Fiji Television quoted him as saying. On 22 March, Prime Minister Laisenia Qarase told Radio Sargam, which is affiliated to the Fiji Village news service, that he hoped Hughes would stay on. "I would be the first person to support the continuation of his contract because he has done an excellent job and on top of that he hasn't finished the job, he's done a lot but there's still a lot to be done. I'd like to see the same person carrying on to complete what he intends to do. It is all to the best interest of Fiji and the population," Qarase said.

Hughes criticised the Fijian military throughout the later part of 2006, as the already-strained relations between the government and the military deteriorated further. The military demanded that he be sacked by the Government. Qarase promised on 30 November 2006 to take the military's concerns into account when deciding whether to renew his position. This and other concessions failed to prevent the military coup which deposed the government on 5 December 2006. The next day, according to the Fiji Live news service, the military junta announced that it had dismissed Hughes from office, citing "dereliction of duty".

In November 2006, it was revealed that Hughes and his family had received death threats. Hughes' family left Fiji after the police received threats relating to the security of his family (wife and 2 sons). Hughes himself followed soon after.

On 29 January 2007, the Fijian Military prevented the possible sale of a launch owned by Hughes. Maintenance personnel hired by Hughes were also prevented from attending to the craft, berthed at the Royal Suva Yacht Club. The Military ordered an inquiry into the vessel.

== Career post 2007 ==
On 9 August 2007, Ban Ki-moon, the Secretary General of the United Nations, announced Andrew Hughes' appointment as Police Advisor to the UN. This role placed Hughes at the head of UN Police Peacekeeping.

== Death ==
Hughes passed away in Cairns in 2018 due to bowel cancer.
