= 2006 Fijian coup d'état =

Coup that overthrew civilian government and made Bainimarama acting Prime Minister

- Part of the Fiji coups
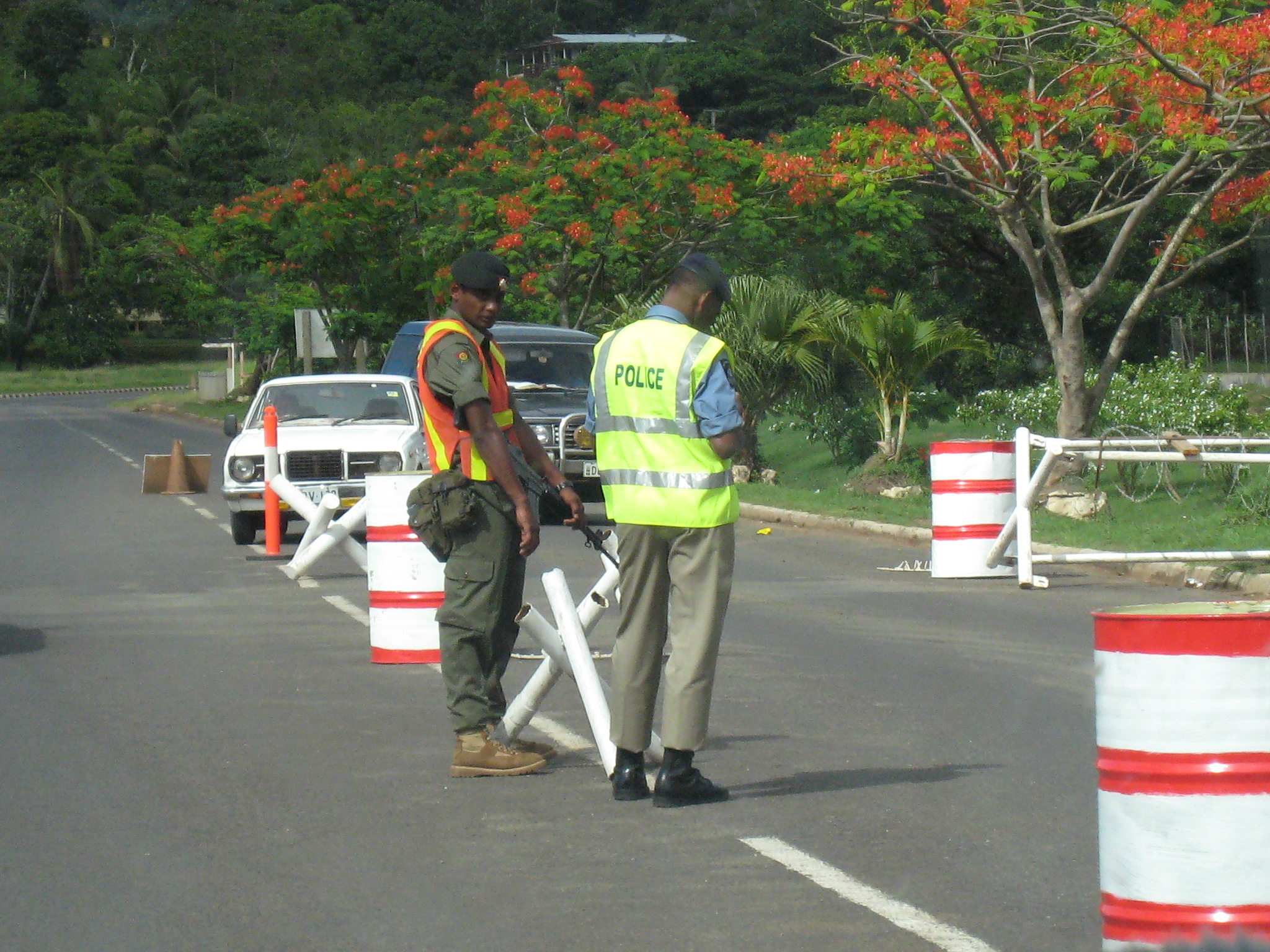
- Fijian security forces manning a checkpoint outside of Labasa
Date	5 December 2006
Location	Fiji
Result	Coup succeeds: Prime Minister Laisenia Qarase, his cabinet, and other government officials are removed from office; After agreeing to appoint Frank Bainimarama as head of an Interim Cabinet, Josefa Iloilo is reinstated as president; Debates over the legality of the coup continue and eventually culminate in the 2009 constitutional crisis

Belligerents
Government of Fiji Political support: (Note: Political support and opposition for Fiji during both the coup itself and the period of military rule.): Australia; Commonwealth of Nations; France; New Zealand; Samoa; Tonga; United States	Fijian Armed Forces Political support: China; India; Russia

Commanders and leaders
Ratu Josefa Iloilo; Laisenia Qarase	Ratu Epeli Nailatikau; Commodore Frank Bainimarama

The Fijian coup d'état of December 2006 was a coup d'état in Fiji carried out by Commodore Frank Bainimarama against Prime Minister Laisenia Qarase and President Josefa Iloilo. It was the culmination of a political crisis that had begun the previous year when the Qarase government introduced three bills to the Fijian Parliament. The Qoliqoli, Land Tribunal, and Reconciliation, Tolerance, and Unity Bills dealt with the ongoing ethnic conflicts in Fiji and the aftermath of the 2000 coup, and were considered to be pro-ethnic Fijian. Bainimarama, the Commander of the Republic of Fiji Military Forces (RFMF), presented the government with a list of demands on 16 October that included withdrawing the bills. Attempts at negotiation failed and the military launched a coup on 4 December. Parliament was dissolved, Qarase and his cabinet were dismissed, and some civilian officials were placed under house arrest. After the Great Council of Chiefs refused to appoint a cabinet friendly to the military, Bainimarama reached an understanding with Iloilo and reinstated him as president on 4 January 2007. Iloilo then appointed Bainimarama acting prime minister in charge of the Interim Cabinet.

Bainimarama stated that he launched the coup in order to "lead us into peace and prosperity and mend the ever widening racial divide that currently besets our multicultural nation". Australian journalist Hamish McDonald described it as "a revolution against the country's chiefly and church establishment". There was strong criticism of the coup by many domestic observers, but public protests were much more muted than following the 2000 coup. Australia and New Zealand condemned the coup, and several international organizations imposed penalties on Fiji. Debates over the constitutionality of the coup continued until 2009, when the High Court of Fiji ruled the coup unconstitutional, precipitating the 2009 Fijian constitutional crisis.

== Background ==
=== Ethnic tensions in Fiji ===
While Fiji was a British colony, the Colonial Sugar Refining Company brought large numbers of indentured Indian laborers to the islands to work on their sugar plantations. As of 2024, descendants of these laborers make up about a third of the population, but before 1987 they outnumbered Indigenous Fijians. Despite being a minority, ethnic Fijians under conservative Prime Minister Kamisese Mara ran all of Fiji's governments from independence until 1987, when Labour Party politician Timoci Bavadra was elected in coalition with the Indo-Fijian National Federation Party. Tensions between ethnic Fijians and Indo-Fijians were strong, and fearing the loss of indigenous Fijian power, Lieutenant Colonel Sitiveni Rabuka launched a pair of coups that overthrew Bavadra, made Fiji a republic, and returned Mara to office. Mara would continue to serve as prime minister and later president until 2000. In 1997, the conservative government acceded to pressure and enacted a new constitution that ended many of the discriminatory laws against Indo-Fijians. Elections under the new constitution were held in 1999, and Mahendra Chaudhry became the first Indo-Fijian to be elected prime minister. However, hardline Fijian ethnic nationalists led by George Speight took Chaudhry hostage and attempted to install Speight as interim prime minister. In the chaos that followed, Chief Justice Timoci Tuivaga and other judges advised RFMF commander Frank Bainimarama to take control on the basis of "necessity". Bainimarama then declared martial law, revoked the 1997 constitution, and declared himself head of state. Bainimarama made Josefa Iloilo the interim prime minister until elections were held the following year; these were won by Laisenia Qarase, an ethnic Fijian. The military put Speight and his co-conspirators on trial for treason and most are now serving life in prison.

Because indigenous Fijians are majority Methodist Christian and Indo-Fijians are majority Hindu, religious differences often play a key role in ethnic struggles. The Methodist Church in Fiji has frequently played a significant role in politics – senior leaders supported the coup of 2000 and the subsequent proposal to pardon those involved. Even the possibility of declaring Fiji a theocratic Christian state was proposed in the past. In 2025, they have tacitly supported a return to the 1997 Constitution over the 2013 Constitution as it entrenches greater Ethnic Fijian rights, including political powers to the Great Council of Chiefs.

=== Political crisis and escalation ===
A long-running conflict between the Qarase government and the military under Bainimarama resulted from three bills under consideration by the Fijian parliament: the Reconciliation, Tolerance, and Unity Bill, Qoliqoli Bill and the Land Tribunal Bill. Perhaps the most significant of these was the RTU bill, which would have granted an amnesty to some of those under investigation for participation in the 2000 coup, including some of Qarase's own ministers. The Qoliqoli Bill proposed to hand control of seabed resources to ethnic Fijians. A truce was brokered by Vice-President Ratu Joni Madraiwiwi on 16 January 2006, but relations between the government and the military remained strained.

On 22 September 2006, Commodore Bainimarama attacked government policies in a speech at Ratu Latianara Secondary School. News service Fiji Village reported that he claimed that government leniency towards perpetrators of the 2000 coup had created a culture of disrespect for the law, to which he attributed the increasing incidents of rape, homicide, and desecration of Hindu temples. He also criticized the Methodist Church for supporting the government. The next day Prime Minister Qarase accused the Commodore's statements of being unconstitutional, and announced his intention to refer the matter to the Supreme Court for a judgement on the proper role of the military. The Methodist Church also reacted strongly to the Commodore's suggestion that government policies could take Fiji back to paganism and cannibalism. Reverend Ame Tugaue, the General Secretary of the Church, commented that the Commander appeared to be ignoring the fact that it was the influence of Christianity that had abolished cannibalism in Fiji.

On 25 September, military spokesman Major Neumi Leweni said that the government's proposed court action was a threat to the nation, and that the military was united in its resolve to prosecute persons implicated in the 2000 coup and in its opposition to the RTU bill. He also reiterated the opposition of the military to the Qoliqoli Bill.

The Fiji Sun quoted Bainimarama on 25 September as saying that his speech at Ratu Latianara Secondary School had been based on the advice of United States General John Brown. The same afternoon, however, United States Ambassador Larry Dinger told the Fiji Village News that Bainimarama had misunderstood Brown's intentions. The military must never challenge the rule of a constitutional government, Dinger insisted. Brown feels that his words of encouragement were misconstrued and may have led to the coup. Leweni subsequently denied that the Fijian military stance on the Qoliqoli Bill had been influenced by Brown.

Major Leweni called on the Qarase government to resign on 6 October 2006, saying that the government had lost all semblance of credibility, integrity and honesty and that the country was sinking into an economic and financial abyss.

=== Ultimatum and failed negotiations ===
On 16 October 2006, Bainimarama issued an ultimatum for the government to meet nine demands or resign by 1 December. The nine demands mainly centered around: the 2000 coup proponents being brought to justice; withdrawing any political machinations which would potentially further economic inequality based on racial grounds; denying intervention by foreign authority (mentioning by name Police Commissioner Andrew Hughes, an Australian national); dropping the court proceedings regarding the military's statements from earlier in the year and formally addressing concerns about government spending and internal governance. A week and a half later, on 31 October 2006, the military staged exercises around Suva and closed off the city's army barracks. The military said that the exercises were not threatening.

In response, Qarase and President Iloilo attempted to fire Bainimarama, who was in Iraq inspecting Fijian peacekeeping troops. Qarase reportedly told Iloilo that the government would step down if Bainimarama was not removed. Nonetheless, their nominee for his replacement declined the position and Major Leweni said the Army remained loyal to Bainimarama. Bainimarama in response repeated his call for the government to meet his demands or step down.

On 4 November, Qarase suspended amnesty provisions for the leaders of the 2000 coup from the RTU Bill, saying that they will investigate further whether the provisions were unconstitutional. Up to this point, this was the only concession made to the military's demands.

On 26 November, while Bainimarama was on a private trip to New Zealand, Police Commissioner Hughes announced that he would be charged with sedition. Bainimarama then called up 1,000 reserve troops. New Zealand's Minister of Foreign Affairs Winston Peters invited Qarase to New Zealand in order to negotiate with Bainimarama. The night before the meeting, Bainimarama said "It's very simple. He [Qarase] comes with a yes or a no to our demands, full stop. He's going to be wasting his time debating issues with me. The meeting's going to be the shortest meeting he's ever attended in his life." The meeting lasted two hours, and no resolution was reached. Both men returned to Fiji after the meeting. Qarase announced concessions to some of the demands: he agreed to suspend the three bills and to drop them altogether if a review found them unconstitutional; he recognized that the 2000 coup had been illegal; he accepted the decision by the Director of Public Prosecutions not to lay sedition charges against military leaders; and he agreed to review the position of the Police Commissioner Hughes. Bainimarama rejected this compromise and reiterated his ultimatum that Qarase must accept all demands by noon the following day or be overthrown by the military.

After the deadline passed on 1 December, Qarase claimed that the deadline had been extended until 3 December, due to the annual rugby union game played between the National Police and the military, but Bainimarama denied that there was an extension. He said he intended to begin a "clean up" campaign of government. Qarase and his government moved to secret locations. On 3 December, Bainimarama announced that he had taken control of Fiji, but Qarase emerged from hiding and said he was still in charge. Radio New Zealand reported on 3 December that Fiji's civil service was still taking its instructions from the civilian administration, and quoted Stuart Huggett, the head of the civil service, as anticipating no change to that.

== Events of the coup ==
On 4 December, after weeks of preparations, the military launched the coup. They confiscated arms from the headquarters of the armed police division in Nasinu and the Nasova Police Academy in Suva. The armed forces held public demonstrations around the capital and blocked the road from Naitasiri province, where Prime Minister Qarase was attending a provincial council meeting. The Prime Minister had to use a helicopter to bypass the checkpoints and return to his home in central Suva.

On the morning of the 5th, armed troops began to surround the offices of government ministers and place them under house arrest, confiscating their phones and vehicles. Qarase announced that he would not resign and attempted to call a cabinet meeting at the government house to discuss the military's demands. However, neither he nor the other government ministers arrived. He asked New Zealand and Australian governments for military assistance, but this was declined. New Zealand Prime Minister Helen Clark said "Our judgment is that this would make the situation worse, and it is not a step we are contemplating". After meeting with Commodore Bainimarama in the morning, Iloilo was reported to have signed a legal order dissolving Parliament, citing the doctrine of necessity, and paving the way for the formation of an interim administration. He later denied having signed such an order and condemned the military takeover, and exiled Police Commissioner Hughes accused Rupeni Nacewa, the President's secretary, of having fabricated the decree. In the event, soldiers entered the Parliament and disbanded the meeting of Senators discussing a motion to condemn the coup.

Bainimarama announced on 6 December that the military had taken control of the government as executive authority in the running of the country. In addition to President Iloilo and Prime Minister Qarase, Bainimarama dismissed a number of public servants. This included Vice-President Joni Madraiwiwi, Police Commissioner Andrew Hughes and his acting replacement Moses Driver, Assistant Police Commissioner Kevueli Bulamainaivalu, chairman Stuart Huggett and chief executive Anare Jale of the Public Service Commission, Solicitor General Nainendra Nand, chief executive of the Prime Minister's Office Jioji Kotobalavu, and Supervisor of Elections Semesa Karavaki.

=== Media censorship ===
On 5 December, the Fiji Times (Fiji's largest newspaper) refused to publish the next day's edition, citing military interference. Soldiers had occupied the premises and warned against publishing "propaganda" from the deposed government. They insisted that they be allowed to monitor news content and demanded approval rights for editorial material, as well as access to news sources. The Daily Post also reported receiving military threats and closed for a while after the coup. Fiji TV, also under pressure from the military, pulled its late evening news bulletin from the air. Fiji TV announced it would not run any more news bulletins until it was satisfied the army would not interfere in its content. It was reported that the military entered the premises of state radio station Fiji Broadcasting Corporation; due to reported military scrutiny of its news scripts the radio station has closed down. On 6 December, the military allowed Fiji Times Limited to resume publication without any interference from its armed forces.

=== Formation of the Interim Cabinet ===
Announcing he had toppled the elected government and taken control on 5 December, Bainimarama said he was assuming the presidency until the following week when the Great Council of Chiefs (GCC) would meet, who would then have the authority to appoint an interim government. In the meantime, he appointed Jona Senilagakali, a 77-year-old military doctor, to serve as caretaker prime minister. Senilagakali stated that he had no choice but to take the job after being ordered to do so. However, the GCC slammed Bainimarama's "illegal, unconstitutional" activities and cancelled their planned meeting. Bainimarama told a press conference on 15 December that he would agree to attend the forthcoming meeting only in his capacity as President of the Republic.

When Bainimarama was told that the Great Council still recognized Ratu Josefa Iloilo as president, he responded that his caretaker government could rule for 50 years if the GCC continued to hold off appointing a new president of Fiji who would swear in a military-backed government. Bainimarama also dismissed Adi Litia Qionibaravi as head of the Fijian Affairs Board that convenes meeting of the Great Council of Chiefs. The Great Council did meet in the third week of December, but failed to persuade the military to relinquish power. It proposed the formation of an interim government representing all major political and social factions in Fiji, but this was rejected by the military, which announced on 27 December that the GCC would be banned from holding further meetings without military approval.

On 4 January 2007, Bainimarama restored Iloilo to the Presidency. Iloilo then made a broadcast endorsing the actions of the military. The next day, he formally appointed Bainimarama as the interim prime minister. An Interim Cabinet was subsequently appointed.

== Reactions ==
Reaction to the coup and the new Interim Cabinet was mixed. The National Alliance Party of Ratu Epeli Ganilau (a former Military commander) welcomed the appointment, as did Himat Lodhia, of the Fiji Chamber of Commerce, and Felix Anthony, general secretary of the Fiji Trades Union Congress. Fiji Labour Party leader Mahendra Chaudhry was more inclined to reserve judgement, while deposed Prime Minister Laisenia Qarase condemned the appointment, saying it amounted to establishing a military dictatorship. United Peoples Party leader Mick Beddoes also criticized it, as did Pramod Rae, general secretary of the National Federation Party, who said that Bainimarama's dual positions of prime minister and military commander created a conflict of interest. Fiji Law Society president Devanesh Sharma described the appointment as unconstitutional, while Winston Peters, New Zealand's Minister of Foreign Affairs, also condemned it as a "charade" that would fool nobody.

The Interim Cabinet received support from the Fiji Human Rights Commission (FHRC) and its chairwoman Shaista Shameem. Shameen agreed with Commodore Bainimarama's views regarding Prime Minister Qarase's allegedly racist and divisive policies. In 2007, the FHRC commissioned an inquiry into the 2006 general election (which had seen Qarase re-elected as prime minister), intended to reveal whether it had truly been "free and fair". The Commission of Inquiry delivered a report which "identifie[d] deficiencies and anomalies at every stage of the election process". More specifically, the report stated that Indo-Fijian voters were provided with incorrect information regarding the voting process, that they were mis-registered in their constituencies to a far greater extent than other voters, and that, as an ethnic group, they faced specific impediments to voting (such as an absence of voting slips required for Indo-Fijian voters) in key marginal constituencies. There was also evidence of ballot boxes having been tampered with. Dr. David Neilson, a member of the Commission of Inquiry, wrote:

The registration process was both inadequate and biased and submissions strongly indicate campaigning involved deliberate and explicit vote-buying near polling day by the SDL party in league with the broader state. [...] The evidence does not provide systematic quantitative proof regarding the extent to which bias and vote-rigging altered the election outcome. But it provides a strong prima facie case that the elections clearly fell short of "free and fair".

The FHRC report's claims were subsequently challenged by one of the 2006 election observers, who claimed that Dr. David Neilson (a leading member of the commission) had 'failed to understand' the mechanics of Fiji's electoral process. David Arms, who served as a member of the Electoral Commission under Bainimarama's government, described the FHRC's report as weak and claimed that there was "undue haste in its preparation" (Arms, 'A Critique of the Report of the Independent Assessment of the Electoral Process in Fiji', 31 July 2007). According to Arms, Neilson and his colleagues reached the verdict that the 2006 result had been 'rigged' mainly on the basis of evidence gleaned at public hearings, without any independent effort to verify the accuracy of the allegations. Arms' report states that most of those who showed up at the hearings had an axe to grind. They were defeated candidates or supporters of political parties that had performed poorly at the polls. The FHRC's report's only evidence of electoral fraud had to do with alleged bias in the treatment of Indian voters' registration slips. However, election observer and Fiji-specializing academic Jon Fraenkel claimed that Neilson's claims were false:

I was a University of the South Pacific election observer during the 2006 election. Early in election week, the problem of officials finding the names of voters on one roll, but not on the other, became apparent and much discussed. I personally raised this with the Fiji Elections Office, and was told that – although the colour-coded registration slips handed out to voters at the time of registration were often in error, the electoral rolls themselves were not. Over the following days of election week, I tested this claim by requesting presiding officers in the polling stations to show me their logbook records of voters who had been able to cast only one vote because their name could not be found in a corresponding open or communal constituency. In every case I checked, the Elections Office was correct: it was possible for presiding officers, if they ignored the registration slips, to use any one correct entry on the electoral roll to find the other. In other words, the problem lay with the registration officials and with the training of polling station officials. It was not an indication of systemic bias or ballot-rigging. In any case, during the final days of election week, in somewhat chaotic circumstances, the Fiji Elections Office effectively dispensed with the electoral rolls as a means of avoiding duplicate voting and allowed citizens whose name was found on one roll to cast a second vote on a corresponding open or communal roll, even if their name could not be found. From that point, prevention of duplicate voting depended solely on reference to the ink marked on voters' fingers'.

The army was also opposed by several important institutions. The Great Council of Chiefs, on 7 December, called the coup illegal and called upon soldiers to "leave the barracks and return home to your people" The President of the Methodist Church of Fiji led a delegation to visit and support the Prime Minister while he was under effective house arrest. The Archbishop of the Anglican Church issued a statement opposing the coup. Churches took out newspaper ads including one quoting Reverend Tuikilakila Waqairatu, president of the Fiji Council of Churches, saying "We are deeply convinced that the move now taken by the commander and his advisers is the manifestation of darkness and evil". Roman Catholic Archbishop Petero Mataca took a more nuanced position, however. In a letter to the Fiji Sun on 10 December, he condemned the coup, but also claimed that the government had pursued policies that had led to it. Part of this statement was quoted in Fiji Village on 12 December. The confiscation of the police's arms faced criticism from acting Police Commissioner Moses Driver, who said the military action was unlawful and unnecessary. Bainimarama responded by saying that the military had taken this action because "we would not want to see a situation whereby the police and the military are opposed in an armed confrontation".

Unlike the 2000 coup, which was marked by looting and burning of businesses, protests were smaller and less violent in 2006. On 7 December 300 villagers blocked the entrance to Tavualevu Village, in response to a rumor that the military was coming to arrest Ratu Ovini Bokini, Chairman of the Great Council of Chiefs. The army quickly denied the rumor. Most government ministries had a full turn out at work, except for certain CEOs, and parliament workers were reportedly offered positions elsewhere in government.

=== Justification of the coup ===
Bainimarama's stated justification for the coup was to "lead us into peace and prosperity and mend the ever widening racial divide that currently besets our multicultural nation". Above all else, he has emphasised the need to root out racially discriminatory legislation and attitudes, and emphasise the common national belonging of Fiji's citizens, above any form of ethnic self-identification. In a speech to the media on 6 December, he accused Qarase of corruption and of having inflamed tensions between ethnic communities through "divisive" and "controversial" policies:

We consider that Fiji has reached a cross roads and that the Government and all those empowered to make decisions in our constitutional democracy are unable to make decisions to [sic] our people from destruction.

As of today, the Military has taken over the Government/executive authority / running of this country. [...]

The RFMF over the years have been raising security concerns with the Government, in particular the introduction of controversial bills, and policies that have divided the nation now and will have very serious consequences to our future generations.

These concerns have been conveyed to the Prime Minister in all fairness and sincerity with the country's interest at heart.

Apparently, all RFMF concerns were never accepted with true spirit. All my efforts to the government were to no avail. Instead, they turned their attention on the RFMF itself. Despite my advice, they tried to remove me and create dissension within the ranks of the RFMF; the institution that stood up and redirected the Nation from the path of doom that the Nation was being led to in 2000. Qarase has already conducted a 'silent coup' through bribery, corruption and introduction of controversial Bill. [...]

Our position can be differentiated from the Qarase Government which for example through the passing of the Reconciliation, Qoliqoli and Land Claims will undermine the Constitution, will deprive many citizens of their rights a [sic] guaranteed under the Constitution and compromise and undermine the integrity of the Constitutional Offices including the Judiciary. [...]

When the country is stable and the Electoral Rolls and other machineries of Elections have been properly reviewed and amended, elections will be held. We trust that the new government will lead us into peace and prosperity and mend the ever widening racial divide that currently besets our multicultural nation.

Addressing the United Nations General Assembly in September 2007, he stated:

[I]n 1970, Fiji started its journey as a young nation on a rather shaky foundation, with a race-based Constitution, one which rigidly compartmentalised our communities. The 'democracy' which came to be practised in Fiji was marked by divisive, adversarial, inward-looking, race-based politics. The legacy of leadership, at both community and national levels, was a fractured nation. Fiji's people were not allowed to share a common national identity.

Of the two major communities, indigenous Fijians were instilled with fear of dominance and dispossession by Indo-Fijians, and they desired protection of their status as the indigenous people. Indo-Fijians, on the other hand, felt alienated and marginalised, as second-class citizens in their own country, the country of their birth, Fiji. [...]

[P]olicies which promote racial supremacy [...] must be removed once and for all. [...] Fiji will look at making the necessary legal changes in the area of electoral reform, to ensure true equality at the polls. [...] [E]very person will be given the right to vote for only one candidate, irrespective of race or religion.

Fiji's race-based electoral system would be replaced by a "one citizen, one vote" system with no ethnic differentiation. This was to be achieved, he declared, through a People's Charter for Change, Peace and Progress, the stated aim of which was to "rebuild Fiji into a non-racial, culturally-vibrant and united, well-governed, truly democratic nation that seeks progress, and prosperity through merit-based equality of opportunity, and peace".

=== International response ===
There was considerable international concern about the situation in Fiji and active involvement by other governments to try to prevent a coup. The Australian and New Zealand governments and media in particular strongly condemned the coup.

New Zealand's Minister of Foreign Affairs Winston Peters described the crisis as a coup and a "creeping siege on democratic institutions". New Zealand Prime Minister Helen Clark said that the Fijian constitution only allowed the President to request the dissolving of Parliament if the Prime Minister no longer had the confidence of the Parliament and that this was clearly not the case. The New Zealand Government also stated those taking part in the coup will be banned from entry to New Zealand, and that military ties, aid and sporting contacts would be cut. Clark said that she would consider sanctions against Fiji. In 2008, after New Zealand refused to grant a study visa to the son of a Fijian government official due to the postponement of elections, Fiji expelled New Zealand's acting high commissioner to Fiji. In response, New Zealand expelled Fiji's high commissioner to New Zealand.

During the political crisis in the months before the coup, Australia moved three warships to waters near Fiji to assist in the evacuation of Australian citizens should a coup occur. Two Australian soldiers died in a Blackhawk helicopter related to this maneuver. In early December, Australia's Foreign Minister Alexander Downer said that the military were "slowly trying to take control" and pressure the PM to resign. Other notable Australians commented on the situation, such as Prime Minister John Howard.

The United States suspended $2.5 million in aid money pending a review of the situation.

Several international organizations condemned the coup or imposed penalties on Fiji. In November, an eminent persons group of Pacific Foreign Ministers was formed to try to defuse the situation. Secretary-General of the United Nations Kofi Annan made a public statement and personally spoken to President Iloilo and Prime Minister Qarase. The International Federation of Netball Associations announced that Fiji, which had been scheduled to host the 2007 Netball World Championships, had been stripped of its hosting rights as a direct result of the coup. The Commonwealth provisionally suspended Fiji's membership, and its Secretary General, Don McKinnon, stated that Bainimarama should resign and that the coup is a total violation of Commonwealth principles. After failing to meet a Commonwealth deadline for setting national elections by 2010 Fiji was "fully suspended" on 1 September 2009.

== Aftermath and legacy ==
Jon Fraenkel and Stewart Firth described the events as "a coup of the radicals amongst the westernized elite, who sought to superimpose a national consensus upon a divided social order", "a coup of utopians seeking to transcend, rather than mould, social forces that they deemed responsible for long-run ethnic disquiet and poor governance". Hamish McDonald, interviewing Bainimarama for the Sydney Morning Herald in October 2007, described it as "a revolution against the country's chiefly and church establishment". He quoted Bainimarama's criticism of the chiefly provincial councils, for allegedly dictating to indigenous citizens whom they should vote for, and of the Methodist Church, for allegedly encouraging indigenous "hatred" against Indo-Fijians.

In March 2008, the publisher of the Fiji Sun, Australian citizen Russell Hunter, was deported on the orders of the interim Defense Minister, Ratu Epeli Ganilau, who claimed that Hunter was a threat to "national security". Opponents of the military-backed government claim that it was a blatant attempt to intimidate the media.

=== Debate over legality ===
It was legally unclear whether removal of a government with the consent of the President would constitute a coup, as that term is usually understood. According to the Constitution of Fiji, under certain conditions if a state of emergency is declared, the President was allowed to appoint an interim government. However, was debated whether the President had removed the Prime Minister of his free will, rather than simply acceding to the demands of the military. Jona Senilagakali, the interim prime minister appointed by the military, stated that he thought that the military coup constituted an illegal act, though a lesser illegal act when compared to the rule of the previous government.

On 18 January 2007, President Iloilo signed a decree granting the Commander and all military personnel, along with all officers and members of the police force, prison officers, and all who served the Interim Cabinet formed after the coup, immunity from all criminal, civil, legal or military disciplinary or professional proceedings or consequences. The decree was published in a government gazette. Tupou Draunidalo, Vice-President of the Fiji Law Society, denounced the decree as illegal. Ousted Prime Minister Qarase also lambasted it as hypocritical, because proposed amnesty for perpetrators of the 2000 coup was one of the reasons given by the military for carrying out the 2006 coup.

In March 2008, High Court began proceedings on a case brought by deposed prime minister Lasenia Qarase, who has asked the courts to rule on the legality of the coup. The Bainimarama government's lawyers argued that the court lacked jurisdiction to question President Iloilo's decision to appoint the Interim Cabinet. Qarase's lawyers countered by suggesting that the court should consider whether the invocation of the doctrine of necessity in the overthrow of the Qarase government was justifiable. On 9 October 2008, the High Court found that President Ratu Josefa Iloilo had acted lawfully when he had appointed Bainimarama as prime minister. Following the ruling, Fiji's interim attorney-general, Aiyaz Sayed-Khaiyum, called upon Australia, New Zealand, the European Union and the United States to lift the sanctions they had imposed on the country, stating that they could no longer refuse to recognise the Interim Cabinet. However, the decision was appealed, and on 9 April 2009, the Court of Appeal ruled that the coup had not been legal and that the "only appropriate course of action at the present time is for elections to be held to enable Fiji to get a fresh start." This led to the 2009 Fijian constitutional crisis.

=== Truth and reconciliation commission ===
In December 2024 the Rabuka government established the Fiji Truth and Reconciliation Commission to inquire into the 1987, 2000, and 2006 coups. In January 2025 Rabuka said he would identify those behind the coups to the commission.

== See also ==
- 2005–06 Fijian political crisis

- 2006 Fijian general election
- Reconciliation, Tolerance, and Unity Bill
- Qoliqoli Bill
- Land Tribunal Bill

- Indians in Fiji
- Contents of the United States diplomatic cables leak (New Zealand)

== Literature ==
- Fraenkel, Jon (2013), "The origins of military autonomy in Fiji: a tale of three coups", Australian Journal of International Affairs, 67 (3): 327–341, doi:10.1080/10357718.2013.788125, S2CID 153470913
- Tansey, O. (2016). The Limits of the "Democratic Coup" Thesis: International Politics and Post-Coup Authoritarianism: Table 1. Journal of Global Security Studies, 1(3), 220–234. doi:10.1093/jogss/ogw009
- Knapman, Bruce (1990). "Economy and State in Fiji before and after the Coups". The Contemporary Pacific. 2 (1): 59–86. JSTOR 23701518.
