= Yellow Ribbon campaign (Fiji) =

In the early 2000s, Prime Minister Laisenia Qarase's government in Fiji proposed legislation to establish a Commission with the power, subject to presidential approval, to pardon perpetrators and compensate victims of the coup d'état against the elected government of Mahendra Chaudhry in 2000. Most Fijian politicians outside of the government came out against proposed legislation Along with many politicians, the Military and a number of business and professional organizations also came out against the bill. The campaign derived its name from the yellow ribbons promoted by the opposition United Peoples Party and worn by many citizens, as a sign of their opposition to the legislation.

A coalition of organizations opposed to the bill announced on 21 July that they had collected more than five thousand signatures throughout the country. Ponipate Ravula of the Citizens Constitutional Forum said that the petition would be presented to the President and other "institutions that can sway public opinion."

== The Fiji Labour Party ==
Opposition Leader and former Prime Minister Mahendra Chaudhry, whose government was toppled in the putsch, alleged that the commission would be a cover for pardoning members of the present government who were implicated in the coup. Chaudhry insisted that one set of rules should apply to everyone, regardless of their position in society, and regardless of their motives for having broken the law. Reacting to Prime Minister Qarase's assertion on 20 May that the government did not need to consult anybody about the legislation, Chaudhry said that the prime minister's attitude was arrogant and that he could expect little cooperation in return. He further stated that granting amnesty to the perpetrators of the 1987 coups was a mistake, which should not be repeated this time. "The trust and confidence we showed then was sadly displaced. This time around, we must take a hard line attitude to those who think they can overthrow a democratically-elected government with impunity. We have to stamp out this coup-culture that has developed in Fiji." He accused the government of failing to pool the people's talents together in an effort to reconstruct their shattered dreams, trust and confidence.

On 24 June, Chaudhry called on Prime Minister Qarase to resign, following "serious allegations" from Roman Catholic Archbishop Petero Mataca that the Prime Minister had misled a delegation of church leaders on 2 May about the true contents of the legislation. "It is disgraceful that the Prime Minister should deceive Church leaders to get their support for the Bill. He then had the audacity to mislead the nation by claiming that the Bill had the support of Christians," Chaudhry said.

Chaudhry issued a warning to the Fijian chiefs on 17 July, saying that the government could not be trusted to mislead them, having already deceived church leaders about the nature and purpose of the bill. He told them to be on their guard, and to listen to their people. Thousands of people in the provinces, chiefly support notwithstanding, had signed the petition against the legislation, he said.

Labour Party Deputy Leader Poseci Bune said on 11 July that he would not participate in the consultations on the bill in his Province of Macuata. He said that petition signature tallies showed that a majority of his fellow ethnic Fijians opposed the legislation, and that they were being cynically manipulated by the Provincial Councils and by the government, which had chosen to consult the Provincial Councils ahead of the Great Council of Chiefs.

Krishna Datt, a Labour Party parliamentarian and former minister, said that the government was ignoring the feelings of the people worst affected by the coup, and that "any move forward would have to be founded on a solid foundation of understanding and a deeply and genuinely felt sense of forgiveness." Instead of trying to impose its will, the government should enter into a dialogue with the Opposition on this matter, he said.

Senivalati Naitala, a Labour Party member and a Ra Fiji Cane Growers Councillor, said on 11 July that the bill was a recipe for terrorism and would be a direct threat to politicians and diplomats. He called for the amnesty clause to be struck from the legislation in order to honestly promote reconciliation and unity in Fiji.

On 28 July, Chaudhry strongly criticized the Great Council of Chiefs for endorsing the legislation, and said that his party would continue to oppose it. It was for the perpetrators of the coup to ask for forgiveness, he said, not for the government to initiate such a move. "It is wrong for others to be asking for forgiveness on behalf of those who had committed the crime because it is not right," he said.

On 2 August, Chaudhry suggested that he and his party might be prepared to support the bill if it was substantially rewritten. He insisted that there could be no reconciliation without truth-telling, and that the bill as it was currently written did not require coup perpetrators seeking amnesty to tell all they knew about the coup or who was behind it. "Without [the coup perpetrators] divulging the information they have, there can not really be any reconciliation. It will merely be a vehicle for them to escape justice as is the provision in the current Bill," Chaudhry said.

Chaudhry also renewed his criticism of the country's fourteen provincial councils and of the Great Council of Chiefs. He said that their decision to endorse the legislation had not done justice to the indigenous people, and that they should be held accountable.

In a Parliamentary debate on 5 August, Labour MP Pratap Chand revealed that his party had initially offered to cooperate in the drafting of the bill, but that Prime Minister Qarase had rebuffed their offer, saying that it would be "too time consuming." The Opposition had wanted to negotiate the matter during the Tanaloa talks (a series of negotiations between the government and Opposition, held under the auspices of the University of Hawaii throughout 2004), Chand said, but the government had instead come up with its own version. The Opposition wanted a reconciliation bill that was victim-oriented, he said, rather than one that was perpetrator-oriented, and accused the government of violating its own principles.

Chaudhry followed Chand's line on 14 August when he confirmed a willingness to negotiate with the Prime Minister, but only through the venue of the Tanaloa talks. He said this in response to recent statements by the Prime Minister that the door was still open for the Leader of the Opposition to participate in the final drafting of the bill. Chaudhry said that if Prime Minister Qarase was serious about negotiation, he should withdraw the bill pending agreement on its clauses. He alleged that the government had had the bill drafted secretly by a law firm in Melbourne, Australia. "He (the Prime Minister) should be genuine in his invitation and not play devious games as he did over the multi-party Cabinet issue," Chaudhry said, a reference to the three-year negotiations, punctuated by numerous legal appeals and counter-appeals, over the formation of a multi-party cabinet, negotiations which the Opposition claims the government conducted in bad faith.

The Prime Minister responded on 16 August that he was always willing to talk with the Leader of the Opposition, but that all preconditions must be dropped. Chaudhry's demands that the bill be withdrawn until a consensus version could be produced, and that it should be negotiated through the venue of the Tanaloa talks – which he wrote off as a "failure" – were unacceptable to him. "Now this is not a trade union. We are running a government, and if he wants to come in engage the Government in discussion on this very important issue, he must come in without any pre-conditions," Qarase said.

Labour Senator Anand Singh told the Senate on 26 August that the legislation was an attempt to amend the Constitution without following the proper procedures. The bill undermined the human rights provisions of the Constitution, he said, and also violated six international laws. These laws, according to him, were the Bill of Rights, Convention on the Elimination of all forms of Discrimination Against Women (CEDAW), Convention on the Elimination of All Forms of Race Discrimination (CERD), International Covenant on Civil and Political Rights (ICCPR), International Covenant on Economic, Social and Cultural Rights (ICESCR) and the Universal Declaration on Human Rights (UDHR).

On 6 September Chaudhry reiterated his view that there should be no forgiveness for anybody who was involved in the 2000 coup. He said that the Labour Party had been forcibly removed from office twice, and wanted justice.

In talks with Commonwealth Secretary General Don McKinnon the next day, Chaudhry called on the Commonwealth of Nations to suspend Fiji from membership if it passed the legislation. "We cannot have a Bill that will be an endorsement for terrorism and lawlessness in this country," he said.

Labour Party Senator Anand Singh said on 8 September that he had raised the bill at a workshop of the Commonwealth Parliamentary Association, which was holding its annual conference in Nadi. A delegate from Ghana had revealed that a similar bill had been introduced in his country, Singh said, but opposition from a majority of the population had forced its withdrawal.

On 30 September, Chaudhry said that the FLP would continue to campaign against the bill, both locally and internationally. Told by Australian Foreign Minister Alexander Downer that Prime Minister Qarase had assured him that the bill would be amended, Chaudhry said that he would wait and see, and would continue to oppose the bill in the meantime. He reiterated this stance on 7 October, rejecting a compromise mooted by Prime Minister Qarase two days earlier, but offering a bargain of his own: if the bill was withdrawn, the FLP would provide the government with the two-thirds parliamentary majority needed to amend the constitution and enact a number of land reforms. He repeated his stance yet again on 26 October, saying that a legal challenge to the legislation was in the pipeline.

== The United Peoples Party ==
United Peoples Party leader Mick Beddoes called the proposal a recipe for disaster which would license any would-be political activist who wanted to engage in coups, to do so. He accused the government of kow-towing to its junior coalition partner, the Conservative Alliance, on which it depends for its parliamentary majority, in order to keep them on board until the next parliamentary election, expected for 2006. In a statement on 16 May, he said that the bill was not about reconciliation or restorative justice, but rather the creation of a "legal framework" to pardon, at will, anyone convicted of coup-related offence. This would lead, he said, to the law of the jungle prevailing. On 14 June, Beddoes announced the beginning of a Yellow Ribbon Campaign to promote a petition aimed at forcing the bill to be withdrawn, or at least significantly amended.

On 17 June, he accused Prime Minister Qarase of lying about widespread public support for the bill, which, Beddoes claimed, most people had not been given the chance to see. The "small group of dissenters" referred to by the Prime Minister were, according to Beddoes, the minority who knew what the bill contained. He said that asking the Fijian people to support the legislation without making them aware of its contents was "a deliberate attempt to mislead the Fijian community." Beddoes was joined on 18 June by Bruce Rounds, the General Secretary of his party, who said that there were major differences not only between Fiji's two principal races, but also within them. This acrimony in the community, he said, was partly to blame for the high rate of emigration, particularly of highly skilled and highly qualified Indo-Fijians.

Following a visit to cities and towns on the northern island of Vanua Levu, Beddoes said on 28 June that he had heard many complaints from locals about having been misled by the title of the bill. The copies of the bill that he had distributed were the first that most of them had seen, he said. Ignorant of what the bill really contained, many had wrongly assumed that it was a sincere effort on the part of the government to unify the country.

On 27 July, Beddoes strongly criticized the Great Council of Chiefs for its refusal to accept submissions from the Fiji Labour Party and the Fiji Council of Churches. He said that the government and the Methodist Church, whose submission was accepted by the Great Council, both had vested interests in the Unity Bill, and that by being selective in its acceptance of submissions, the council would not be hearing balanced appraisal of the bill.

Beddoes condemned what he saw as the hypocrisy of imprisoning a man for three years for the theft of six buns and F$200 cash, while legislating provisions to free men imprisoned for much more serious crimes including treason, murder, rioting and looting.

Beddoes intensified his attack on the chiefs on 2 August, saying that history would judge them for their endorsement of the bill. He was not surprised by the decision, he said, as a vote against the bill would have amounted to a vote of no confidence in the government, but they could have recommended certain amendments. "History will judge them once the impact of the Bill is discharged", he said. "There is no way anyone with a conscience can support the Government's attempt to legitimise and excuse the act of treason as being justified because it was politically motivated."

Speaking on Radio Sargam on 16 August, Beddoes declared that if the bill was passed without very significant amendments, he would challenge it in the courts.

== The National Alliance Party ==
National Alliance Party founder and former Great Council of Chiefs Chairman Ratu Epeli Ganilau said that the notion that politically motivated crimes could be justified was "insulting to the intelligence of ordinary people," and that it represented a naive and uncaring attitude toward the hurt suffered by many during the 2000 coup. "The intention to bring a closure to investigations and litigation regarding the 2000 coup would be a severe interference of politics into the work of law enforcement in this country," Ganilau said. On 18 May, he added that he saw "nothing reconciliatory about the bill," which he believed to be aimed at legalizing the Muanikau Accord, which had been proposed by George Speight in 2000. "To use the word reconciliation is a gross violation of the rights of everyone in this nation," he said.

On 16 June, Ganilau accused Prime Minister Qarase of contradicting himself, saying that his denial of a general amnesty in the Fiji Times (on 15 June) conflicted with comments that he had made in New Zealand the weak before. This would, he considered, undermine the Prime Minister's credibility. He also said that there was a widespread belief in Fiji that the legislation was designed to provide for the freeing of coup perpetrators, a belief by the Tui Vaturova, Ratu Ilisoni Rokotuibua who said early in June that it would allow members of the Counter Revolutionary Warfare Unit, who had been jailed for mutiny, to be released. Having built up such expectations, Ganilau said, the government had better be prepared for a strong backlash if they were not fulfilled. He criticized Qarase for expecting the people, as ordinary mortals, to do as only God could do by legislating forgiveness and freeing people from the consequences of their actions.

On 23 June, Ganilau condemned what he said was the Prime Minister's "monumental deception" in asking church leaders to support the legislation without honestly explaining its contents to them. He was reacting to revelations from Roman Catholic Archbishop Petero Mataca and other church leaders that at a meeting with the Prime Minister on 2 May, they had been told of the reconciliation and compensation provisions of the legislation, but not about its amnesty provisions. "It does not say much about the credibility of the Prime Minister for him to be saying publicly that the Christian churches support the bill after these deliberate acts of deception." Ganilau said. He called on churches to join with other religions to put together an alternative blueprint to the government's reconciliation proposals.

The National Alliance Party's submission to Parliament on 27 June warned that if the legislation is passed, the first victim could be the government, as the army could use its legitimization of treason as a legal weapon to oust the government.

Ganilau reiterated his stand on 3 July that the legislation was motivated not by the goal reconciliation, but by ulterior motives, namely the freeing of lawbreakers. He called on the Prime Minister and the Attorney-General to come clean about the government's real reasons for promoting the legislation. The bill could not achieve its purported goal of reconciliation, he added, because it made no provision for offenders and victims to meet and ask forgiveness. He called on the government to remember that the 2000 coup happened because the perpetrators of the early 1987 coups had been granted immunity from prosecution.

On 18 July, Ganilau said he did not believe amendments promised by the government were to be taken seriously. He made the dismissive comment after the government said it would amend the legislation to protect the independence of the police and the judiciary. He said the government had a "dismal" record on keeping its promises, and believed this latest commitment would be no different. "As it is, their record of political commitments have been dismal because they had not been genuine in nation building from the beginning and this includes the introduction of this Bill itself," Ganilau said. He also called on the government not to try to deceive the Great Council of Chiefs, which is due to meet to discuss the bill in the third week of July.

Reacting to the decision of the chiefs to support the bill on 27 July, Ganilau said that he would have expected the chiefs to have taken more time to consider and debate the matter, but that their decision would make no difference in the end because it was Parliament that would decide on the bill.

On 2 August, Ganilau said that Prime Minister Qarase was wrong to defend the decision of the provincial councils to endorse the legislation, saying that they had based their decision solely on information presented by the government, and had not been given the chance to hear alternative views.

Ganilau reiterated his opposition to the legislation on 7 October, along with his support of the right of the Military to speak out against government policies that it considered not conducive to national security. He considered that the country could not afford to give amnesty to people who had wronged others. "In good times the military will not interfere in politics," he said, but added that the Military had a legitimate interest in opposing the Unity Bill because it could threaten national stability. "Maybe it is going to be a cause of instability in future when we continue to provide amnesty for those who have done wrong and our society won’t tolerate that," Ganilau said.

=== Meli Waqa ===
Meli Waqa, Secretary of the National Alliance Party of Fiji, said on 25 May that the amnesty provisions of the bill were "repugnant to people's sense of justice." He said that it confused traditional reconciliation practices with legal remedies. "While it is acceptable in Fijian custom to reconcile conflicts at a personal level, the rule of law must prevail – where reconciliation requires redress and recognition of our existing laws that protect society," Waqa said. He also expressed concern that the legislation would compromise the role of the President. Modelled on the British Monarchy, the role of the President is supposed to be a nonpolitical one, but this would be called into question, Waqa said, by the provisions in the legislation granting the President the final decision on whether to accept or reject all recommendations of the proposed commission.

=== Filipe Bole ===
Former Foreign Minister and current National Alliance Party spokesman Filipe Bole said on 31 May that he considered the legislation dangerous. It could, he feared, provide the Military with a legal mechanism to overthrow the government at any time in the future, as it rendered any politically motivated act excusable. "The army is already on top of the situation and once the Bill is passed, it will then give the army the legal weapons to oust the Government," Bole said.

Addressing the Lau Provincial Council meeting on 25 July, Bole spoke at length about the bill's amnesty clauses, and said that the failure of the bill to mention the word "truth" was a very significant omission.

== The Mara family ==
The children of the late President Ratu Sir Kamisese Mara, who was deposed during the upheaval, strongly opposed the legislation.

- Mara's eldest child, Adi Ateca Ganilau, who is married to Ratu Epeli Ganilau (q.v.) said on 25 June that the Mara family was opposed to the legislation and would not accept any compensation offered them by the proposed commission. She called the bill "a forced idea," said that it would set "a dangerous precedent," and questioned government's motives for promoting it. "If the move to reconcile and compensate came from the coup perpetrators maybe, I would have given it some thought but coming from the Government is hard to accept," Ganilau said.

Ganilau said that the government's previous attempt at a national reconciliation, during Fiji Week (4–11 October 2004 had been a failure, and thought it "ridiculous" that the government was now trying another scheme to "excuse people involved in the coup." This, she said, was "not on." She also complained that the government had shown no interest in including the Mara family in the reconciliation process. "The hurt is still with us, something we do not openly discuss but this government has not attempted to include us in any of their reconciliation process," Ganilau said.

In a statement on 24 July, Ganilau charged that the coup had not occurred spontaneously but had been "premeditated, well planned with all the personal graffiti being churned out through government offices and business outlets, ludicrous paraphernalia designed to malign the former President's family and character." She accused some members of the 2000 and present Senate of openly telling the public then that the government would soon be changed. "So what was the Fijian cause all about?" she asked rhetorically.

Following the decision of the Great Council of Chiefs on 27 July to support the bill, Ganilau said on 30 July that she and her family would continue to oppose it, as it amounted to legalizing the overthrow of her father.

- Ganilau's younger sister, Senator Adi Koila Nailatikau, who was held as a hostage by the perpetrators of the coup, added her own voice to the opposition to the legislation on 7 May 2005, saying that if her father were alive, he would not approve of interfering with the course of justice, and that unless all perpetrators of the coup were brought to justice, "Fiji cannot put to rest the ghosts of the coup." She also suggested that if the government was serious about reconciliation, it should have done something about it while her father was alive. "For all I know this has come very late in the day and it's a bit too late," Nailatikau said.

Renewing her attack on the legislation on 20 July, Nailatikau accused the government of neglecting "urgent and realistic issues" like squatters, unemployment, poverty, and road conditions, in order to concentrate on a bill which was biased towards the perpetrators of the coup rather than the victims. "This Bill is lenient towards the perpetrators while the victims get nothing," she said. She confirmed that she would attend a meeting of the Lau Provincial Council, set for 25 July. The Council already knew her views, she said, and she would reiterate them in the presence of the Council members if asked to do so. She accused the government of misleading the Fijian people, who had been given to believe that the legislation would strengthen indigenous power, adding that she had personally confronted someone who was distributing leaflets, which she said promoted discrimination against other races.

Nailatikau also challenged the government to say why it could not function without the coup perpetrators. Joji Kotobalavu, a spokesman for the Prime Minister's office, reacted by asking, "What kind of question is that?"

Speaking on behalf of the family, Nailatikau again condemned the legislation on 24 July, saying that it was tantamount to supporting the overthrow of their father. Nailatikau said the bill went against everything her father had believed in. "I recall what the late Tui Nayau said at his last Lau Provincial Council meeting on Ono, Lau, in October 2000: 'There can be no reconciliation or peace until the coup investigations are completed and the rule of law is upheld'", she said. Her father had stood for the rule of law, unity, tolerance, and peaceful coexistence, she said. His policies had "brought peace and unity to the different races of Fiji."

Nailatikau said that some government authorities were "hell-bent" on pursuing the amnesty clauses of the bill, thereby creating the impression that there was some connection between the coup perpetrators and themselves. She demanded to know what the connection was.

In the same statement, Nailatikau spoke highly of Military commander Frank Bainimarama (q.v.), another strident opponent of the legislation. "The commander is doing a wonderful job because he is not only speaking in his personal capacity as Commander," she said. "He is speaking as the Commander of the Fiji battalion in Fiji and those serving overseas, and he has the support of the silent majority," Nailatikau said.

Following a vote of the Lau Provincial Council to endorse the bill on 25 July, Nailatikau was at first too disappointed to speak to the media. She later said that the decision was "regretable and unfortunate" given the seriousness of the crimes committed in 2000. She said that the release of coup perpetrators could not be condoned by right-thinking and law-abiding citizens. "To put it in simple English, you break the law, you commit a crime, you do the time," she said. Nobody was above the law, she maintained, and it was the duty of the government and the people to uphold it. Nailatikau reiterated earlier statements that endorsing the bill amounted to approving the overthrow of her father, and expressed her belief that the Provincial Council members who had voted in favour of the legislation had not understood it – an assertion promptly rejected by Prime Minister Qarase, also a Lauan, who claimed that most people were well informed on the bill and supported it because they did understand it and agreed with it.

== Other politicians and chiefs ==
- National Federation Party (NFP) President Dorsami Naidu spoke out against the bill on 14 May, saying that what happened in the 2000 coup was "an act of terrorism", and that he could not see why persons implicated in it should be considered for amnesty. On 20 May, he called for public demonstrations to oppose the bill, which he said was "just a cover for providing amnesty to people who committed the May 2000 coup crime acts." The NFP disagreed with the Fiji Labour Party (FLP) over tactics for opposing the legislation, with its General Secretary Pramod Rae saying on 6 June that the FLP decision to boycott parliamentary committees was "a cowardly act" that would "effectively render the Indo-Fijian community voiceless." It would be better, he said, to work to change the viewpoints of government legislators by scrutinizing public submissions on the bill in the parliamentary committees.
- Soqosoqo ni Vakavulewa ni Taukei Secretary Ema Druavesi accused the government (18 May) of harbouring ulterior motives in promoting the bill. The real purpose was to retain the loyalty of the Conservative Alliance (CAMV), whose six votes were crucial to maintaining the government's parliamentary majority. Many members of the CAMV were implicated in the coup.
- Ratu Aisea Katonivere, the Paramount Chief of Macuata Province, announced on 2 June that he was withdrawing his previous support for the bill after Attorney General Bale clarified that amnesty was, indeed, provided for in the legislation. "I do not support its amnesty provisions," Katonivere said. "The majority of our sons who were convicted have accepted, suffered and served sentences for their deeds. People should learn to respect the law and abide by it, and face the consequences. Only then will they learn from their mistakes ... To suspend or hinder the process of law by the judiciary will not be championed by me."
- Senator James Ah Koy announced his opposition to the legislation on 28 June, in defiance of the Kadavu Provincial Council, labelling it a "diabolically conceived bill with its origins in hell." Ah Koy acknowledged that his defiance of the Provincial Council's decision to support the bill might cost him his seat in the Senate, but said that he would not shrink from standing for truth as he saw it. "This Bill is anti-Bible and every Christian should vote against it if they are true to the God of Abraham, Isaac, Jacob and Israel," he said. He criticized Ratu Nawalowalo and the Provincial Council for supporting the bill without consulting the tribes and villages of the province. He charged that the government's real motive in promoting the bill was to save the skins of some of its members who were being pursued by the police.
- Adi Ema Tagicakibau, a Cabinet Minister in the deposed People's Coalition government and now a spokesperson for the Pacific Concerns Resource Centre, said on 31 July the Great Council of Chiefs had missed a great opportunity to show true leadership when it decided on 27 July to endorse the bill. "We are naturally disappointed as we had hoped in our submission to make the chiefs see the self-serving interests behind this Bill, that had nothing at all to do with genuine reconciliation for the nation," she said. She said that opponents of the bill needed to continue to educate the public as to its true purpose, and to vote their conscience in the upcoming election, due in 2006.

== The Fiji Law Society ==
On 21 May, Fiji Law Society president Graeme Leung spoke out against the bill, which he said would empower politicians to overturn judicial decisions. Leung said that he and the Law Society supported the idea of reconciliation, tolerance, and unity, but were strongly opposed to pardoning perpetrators of the coup. The amnesty provisions of the legislation were, he said, "repugnant" and would hamstring the courts. "It's likely to demoralise the judiciary and sap it of the will to continue its work." He also argued it would also encourage future generations to regard coups as something they could take part in with impunity.

While opposing the legislation, however, he cautioned the military to show restraint, saying that Parliament had the constitutional right to pass laws, whether good or bad, and that it was up to the people to punish politicians for bad laws at election time. "If the law is bad and unpopular, it is for the people through the ballot box, to show their displeasure. But in a democracy, it is not the business of the military, however well-intentioned, to interfere with the law-making process."

In a further hard-hitting letter to Prime Minister Qarase, Leung said on 23 May that the bill was "not the answer to Fiji's problems," and would not achieve its purpose of reconciling Fiji's communities. Its provisions for amnesty and compensation of victims, he said, favoured the rich over the poor. He warned the government against assuming the support of a majority of the public. As Fijian culture did not encourage outspokenness, Leung said, it would be a mistake to interpret silence as support. "It's the way we are – our people show their respect to their leaders by keeping quiet. It is considered rude to speak your mind," he told the Prime Minister. (Attorney General Qoriniasi Bale countered this the next day by saying that equally, the silence of the population should not be interpreted as meaning that they opposed the legislation).

In a parliamentary submission on 16 June, Leung called the bill a recipe for instability, terror and payback, and a retrograde step, which could threaten present and future governments. "It would encourage the belief that if people think they have sufficiently good political reason to topple a government, politicians might consider granting them a pardon," Leung said. He expressed content that the decisions of the Commission and Amnesty Committee would not be required to state any reasons for their decisions, which would not be subject to appeal. He said it was "abhorrent and unacceptable" to create what amounted to retrospective legalization of a terrorist act.

On 3 July, Leung said that if the bill became law with its amnesty provisions intact, the Law Society would challenge it in the courts. He said that he had tried to schedule an appointment with the Prime Minister to discuss the whole matter, but that more than a week later, he had received no reply.

Leung said on 4 July that he was seeing an audience with the Attorney-General to try to persuade him to rewrite the bill after Military Commander Frank Bainimarama called it "ethnic cleansing." Calling ethnic cleansing a horrific idea, Leung said that every right thinking person would be alarmed that the debate had risen to that level, and that there was an urgent to hold talks to resolve the standoff.

On 2 August, Leung expressed disappointment, but not surprise, that the Great Council of Chiefs had decided on 27 July to support the bill. The Society would continue to look at a legal challenge to it, he said. Leung's latest comments drew a sharp response the next day from Cabinet Minister and Leader of the House Jonetani Kaukimoce, who said that he would have expected the Law Society, as the representative body of the legal profession, to behave in a more appropriate and dignified manner.

== Citizens Constitutional Forum ==
Rev. Akuila Yabaki of the Citizens Constitutional Forum said that "the policy behind the bill should be offensive to right-thinking people," because it would be impossible to have reconciliation without including in the decision-making Indo-Fijians, who he said "bore the brunt of the coup." He also opposed the possible appointment of former Chief Justice Tuivaga to chair the commission. Tuivaga played a controversial role in recognizing the Interim Military Government that took power during the 2000 coup, and in an extra-constitutional reorganizing of the judiciary, a move that was later reversed.

Yabaki was joined by fellow CCF spokesman Jone Dakuvula on 21 June, who accused the government's coalition parties (the Soqosoqo Duavata ni Lewenivanua and the Conservative Alliance) of violating their own election manifestos by sponsoring the legislation, which he said flew in the face of their election promises to uphold the rule of law and the independence of the judiciary.

In a parliamentary submission on 27 June, Dakuvula declared that the bill, having already become a cause of division and dissent, would not promote reconciliation. The secrecy with which the bill was drafted, and the haste with which it was being pushed through parliament, contradicted the government's assertions that it was an instrument of reconciliation, he considered. He said that the bill gave victims no incentive to forgive, and that it did not require wrongdoers to express remorse or apologise. The bill's compensation provisions, he said, were completely inadequate. Too few would qualify for compensation, and it would be much more limited than what an existing court might award.

Forum spokesman Ponipate Ravulo told a public rally on 21 July that the consultation process on Unity Bill was being manipulated by the government to keep the public uninformed, and that "grassroots" people had not been involved. He said that the country could not afford another coup and therefore the bill should not be passed.

Yabaki reiterated his opposition to the bill on 5 February 2006.

== Religious opposition ==
The Roman Catholic Church, several Protestant churches, and numerous Hindu organizations were extremely critical of the bill and called on the government to withdraw it.

Archbishop Petero Mataca of the Roman Catholic Church spoke out against the bill on 22 June, reversing earlier support for it – support that he claimed had been based on a misleading presentation from the Prime Minister before the legislation was made public. He called the overthrow of a democratically elected government a serious crime, and said that "the coup cycle" would continue unless those involved faced the consequences of their crimes.

The Shree Sanatan Dharm Pratindhi Sabha Fiji and the Arya Pratinidhi Sabha were among the numerous organizations representing Hindu faith, followed by some 76 percent of the Indo-Fijian community, to have strongly condemned the legislation, especially its amnesty provisions.

Other religious groups to oppose the legislation include the Salvation Army, the Council of Interfaith Search Fiji, the Jesus Christ Apostolic Church, the Jehovah's Witnesses, and a dissident faction of the Methodist Church (as opposed to the official Methodist stance in support of the bill). Josateki Koroi, a former President of the Methodist Church of Fiji and Rotuma is one of the critical voices.

== Women's organizations ==
- Shamima Ali, coordinator of the Fiji Women's Crisis Centre, called the bill an invasion of human rights and said (14 May) that the government should not bulldoze its way through and impose the legislation without the consent of the people. On 15 July, her deputy, Edwina Kotoisuva, said that rape and other sexual crimes, particularly against Indo-Fijian women, had been widely committed by perpetrators of the coup, and that the amnesty provisions of the proposed law could result in such crimes remaining beyond the reach of justice.
- Ravesi Johnson of the women's organization Soqosoqo Vakamarama i Taukei spoke out against the legislation on 26 May. "The proposed bill has the objective of granting amnesty to those who were accused of political crime," she said. This would, she considered, threaten the future peace and stability of the country where women wanted their children to be raised. (Johnson's opinion does not appear to reflect the group as a whole, which endorsed the bill on 21 July, according to its Tailevu Provincial representative, Adi Finau Tabakaucoro).
- Suliana Siwatibau of a group called Concerned Mothers Group Against the Bill said on 16 June that the widespread opposition to the legislation was motivated not only by its contents, but also because of what she said was the government's unwillingness to proceed with its development in a transparent and consultative process. Opposing amnesty for perpetrators of political crimes, the widow of the academic leader Savenaca Siwatibau called instead for more direct compensation of the victims of such crimes. "I do not see why they want to claim for compensation when this could be done through the Ministry of Labour on the workmen's compensation of something like F$20,000," she said. Siwatibau expressed concern that the legislation threatens the independence of the judiciary. She also said she was alarmed that it would have a corrupting effect on the minds and character of the future generation, which would threaten the future stability and prosperity of the nation. Children, she said, should not be exposed to this "coup culture."

Reacting to the decision of the Great Council of Chiefs to endorse the bill, Siwatibau said on 29 July that the chiefs were right to invite concerned groups to inform them of their objections, but had not been given enough time to deliberate on the matter. Over four-fifths of the Great Council members were delegates of the country's fourteen Provincial Councils, which all endorsed the bill – something which came as no surprise to Siwatibau as they had been briefed only by the government and were required to make a decision on the spot, without being given the opportunity to hear alternative viewpoints. At the very least, she said the Provincial Councils should have been given a Fijian translation of the bill.

- The Fiji Women's Lawyers Association attacked the legislation on 22 June, saying that it was dangerous and would allow the overthrow of another lawfully elected government. The association's president, Ulamila Fa-Tuituku, together with lawyers Ana Rokomokoti, Diane Buresova, Marie Chan and Renee Lal recommended in their parliamentary submission that the amnesty clauses be excised from the bill, because they only served the interests of the perpetrators of the coup. The Association also considered that the compensation provisions were insufficient to cover the gross violations of human rights that took place during the coup. There was nothing the government could do to take away the lifetime scars that the victims carried.
- The National Council of Women, representing 39 affiliate organizations, declared its opposition to the bill on 20 July, saying that women had not been adequately consulted and that insufficient attention had been paid to the crimes committed against women in the 2000 coup. Spokeswoman Sharon Bhagwan-Rolls expressed concern at the effect the bill would have on social values, as well as on constitutional principles. "We are concerned the provisions of amnesty will perpetuate the coup cycle and undermine the important values we share despite by our ethnic and religious diversities," she said. "We are concerned the provisions of the Bill duplicate constitutional provisions and serve to undermine the (independent) role of the judiciary, police and Office of the Director of Public Prosecutions, as well as the Fiji Human Rights Commission." Baghwan-Rolls proposed a referendum to settle the matter – something the government had already rejected.

== Other non-government organizations ==
- Dr Shaista Shameem of the Fiji Human Rights Commission said on 15 May that parts of the bill appeared to conflict with the Constitution.
- The Fiji Institute of Accountants released a statement on 27 May, saying that the proposal would "offer an escape for offenders from civil and criminal liabilities." The statement also expressed concern that the legislation was "sending the wrong message to young people because they will think that crimes committed with political motives can be quashed, especially if a government that supports their view is in power."
- Kallu Dhani Ram, General Secretary of the Kisan Sangh, Fiji's oldest farmers' organization, established in 1937, spoke out on 28 May, calling the legislation an "abuse of power." He said that while the proposed Commission would be empowered to compensate coup victims for personal assault and loss of property, there was no provision to compensate people for the emotional trauma they had suffered. Moreover, he disagreed with the use of taxpayers' money to compensate victims of the coup. "It is most unfair to compensate the victims of wrongs done by the offender from taxpayers money because it amounts to compensating the victim from his own money," he said.

The Kisan Sangh reiterated its opposition to the legislation on 7 July and again on 17 August, with Ram saying on both occasions that the bill would only aggravate tensions between the races, and would be a recipe for further coups in future. Even a wholly indigenous Fijian government would not be safe, he said.

- Economist Wadan Narsey said on 31 May that the estimated administrative cost of the proposed Commission would be F$6 million. This figure did not include compensation layouts. He questioned the wisdom of establishing the Commission at all, from the angles of both justice and economics. "Criminals could be granted amnesty, protected from civil or criminal charges, and given immunity from claims for fair compensation," he said. This would discourage investors. He also said that pardoning soldiers convicted of mutiny would demoralize the Military and undermine discipline.
- Former Assistant Director of Public Prosecutions Gregory Allen accused the government of being more concerned about its own electoral survival than about the rule of law. In a press release on 8 June, Allen, now a senior lecturer in Transnational Crime Prevention at Australia's Wollongong University, said that the bill was "deceptively" labelled and that its true purpose was to pardon convicts and prevent further prosecutions of people involved in the 2000 coup. "Through this jurisprudential delusion, of course, the crime of treason simply ceases to exist," he said.
- William Parkinson of Communications Fiji Limited, a broadcasting company, said on 15 June that the government had left it too late to consult the public about the legislation. If reconciliation was the purpose of the bill, he said, the public should have a sense of ownership over it. The amnesty provisions would tear the nation apart, he said, rather than foster reconciliation.
- Samisoni Kakaivalu, editor of the Fiji Times, said that he supported the reconciliation provisions of the bill, but considered its amnesty provisions "destructive to promoting reconciliation." He also expressed concern that the bill had not been translated into Fijian, which meant that some people could not understand its contents.
- Dr Biman Prasad, Associate Professor of Economics at the University of the South Pacific, told the annual general meeting of the Fiji Institute of Accountants on 18 June that he considered the legislation to be a scapegoat, a political ploy on the part of the government to distract the public from the serious issues affecting the economy. He said that reconciliation would stand a far better chance of success if a climate of economic prosperity and social justice could be created, to improve the quality of life for the people.
- The Concerned Citizens Against the Unity Bill, a coalition bringing together many of the opponents of the legislation, organized a mass rally against the bill in Suva on 21 July. A week before the rally, Senator Felix Anthony, a spokesman for the coalition, accused the government of having misled the population, including the nation's churches, about the true purpose of the bill. "We firmly believe the Government is just giving one side of the Bill for the public to know about and that is not good," Anthony said. Coalition member Bernadette Ganilau, who is married to Ratu Rabici Ganilau, the younger brother of the National Alliance Party founder (q.v.), said that the legislation would only lead to hatred and violence rather than tolerance and accommodation. She said that the opponents of the bill had chosen the colour yellow for their campaign because it represented hope, life, and good sense. "Car and business owners, villagers and residents are encouraged to tie a yellow ribbon on their car, their boat, around a tree, on their door and anywhere it can be seen," Ganilau declared. She expressed the hope that parliamentarians would vote according to their conscience, rather than along party lines.
- Psychotherapist Selina Kuruleca told the parliamentary committee on 21 October that the amnesty clauses could cause severe widespread emotional distress in the future and could lead to "the erosion of accepted social norms of behaviour and the normalisation of violence with psychological consequences that can last beyond the Government lifespan."
- Maciu Navakasuasua, an explosives expert who served a three-year prison term on Nukulau Island for coup-related offences, spoke out against the legislation on 3 January 2006. Navakasuasua, who had since recanted his role in the coup and generated considerable media publicity with his allegations against high-profile citizens, said that the bill was politically motivated and would incur divine judgement. Speaking to the Fiji Sun, Navakasuasua praised Military Commander Commodore Frank Bainimarama for opposing the legislation, and said that justice must be done. "I was one of the coup planners and have served my time in prison," he said.

== The police ==
- Police Commissioner Andrew Hughes expressed reservations about the legislation on 24 May, saying that empowering the proposed commission to override decisions of the judiciary could compromise police investigations. He said that he would inform Home Affairs Minister Josefa Vosanibola of his reservations. Hughes had previously stated that a better approach to reconciliation could involve George Speight, the chief instigator of the 2000 coup, testifying to the police and revealing all he knew. He said that Speight had turned down several attempts by the police to persuade him to do so.

The disagreement between the government and the police escalated on 7 July, after the police made a submission to Parliament strongly opposing the bill, saying that it would create more division, encourage coups, threaten national peace and security, and undermine the powers vested in the Commissioner of Police by the Fijian Constitution. Home Affairs Minister Josefa Vosanibola ordered Commissioner Hughes to refrain from making any further public comments. As a government institution, Vosanibola said, the police must express their opinions through the proper channels.

"The Fiji police believes the primary purpose of the proposed Bill is to grant amnesty to those who committed serious criminal offences during and after the events of May 2000," the parliamentary submission said. "Serious criminal offences that were committed during the designated period mentioned in the Bill include murder, serious injuries to people and damage to properties. "To allow murderers and those who committed treason to go free is political expediency rather than promoting reconciliation, tolerance and unity in Fiji."

== The Military ==
The Military of Fiji also opposed the bill. Commander Commodore Frank Bainimarama called it "Reconciliation bull" on 13 May 2005, and on 16 May, Army spokesman Captain Neumi Leweni said that a meeting of senior officers had resolved to try to prevent the passage of the legislation. "We are not in favour of the Bill that proposes to offer amnesty for coup perpetrators in 2000, and will do all we can to oppose it," Leweni said. Among other objections, the Military claims that its integrity and discipline would be undermined if soldiers who mutinied in the 2000 upheaval were to be pardoned.

== See also ==
- Fiji Truth and Reconciliation Commission
- Qualified positions on the bill
- Military opposition to the bill
- International reaction to the bill
