= Military opposition to the Reconciliation, Tolerance, and Unity Bill =

Reaction to proposed Fijian government body

Commodore Frank Bainimarama, Commander of the Republic of Fiji Military Forces, had been a vociferous and uncompromising critic of the government's proposal to establish a Reconciliation and Unity Commission, with the power to grant compensation to victims of the 2000 Fijian coup d'état, and amnesty to perpetrators of it. Among other objections, the Military claimed that its integrity and discipline would be undermined if soldiers who mutinied in the 2000 upheaval were to be pardoned.

The military's opposition to the Bill culminated in a coup d'état in December 2006.

== The power struggle ==
On 13 May 2005, Bainimarama spoke out against the proposal, calling it "Reconciliation bull" and vowing that he and the military would oppose the legislation, which detractors say is a sham to grant amnesty to supporters of the present government who played roles in the coup. His attack on the legislation, which continued unremittingly throughout May and into June, further strained his already tense relationship with the government.

Bainimarama was supported by Army spokesman Captain Neumi Leweni, who said on 16 May that a meeting of senior officers had resolved to try to prevent the passage of the legislation. "We are not in favour of the Bill that proposes to offer amnesty for coup perpetrators in 2000, and will do all we can to oppose it," Leweni said.

Bainimarama said on 1 June that having undergone three coups in eighteen years, Fiji could not be compared to other commonwealth countries. He said this in response to claims by Home Affairs Minister Vosanibola that Fiji was the only country in the Commonwealth of Nations whose Military commander dared to oppose government policy. Bainimarama refused to say what the military would do if the government insisted on passing the bill, saying that they would cross that bridge when they came to it.

Tensions escalated after 4 June, when Bainimarama publicly accused Prime Minister Qarase of having snubbed a military parade the previous day, in honour of Fijian soldiers returning from peacekeeping missions in East Timor.

Commodore Bainimarama reiterated the Military's opposition to the legislation on 24 August. He asserted that it was the Military's prerogative to decide on the bill, as it was they and not the government that was responsible for the stability currently enjoyed by Fijian citizens. In a four-page statement, Bainimarama said that the Military, the Police, and the office of the Director of Public Prosecutions had done much to restore stability to Fiji, with no assistance whatsoever from the government.

On 12 October, Military spokesman Captain Neumi Leweni emphasized that the Military still wanted the bill withdrawn in its entirety. The amendments to the amnesty clauses hinted at by Prime Minister Qarase were not a sufficient guarantee that no coup perpetrators would be released, he said. He added that while the Military was committed to protecting the democratically elected government, it would not allow supporters of the 2000 coup to "bulldoze" the legislation through. Leweni reiterated this stance on 28 November. "We stated earlier that we do not want this bill at all and even if there are amendments we will still not support its implementation," he said. He threatened legal action if the bill, in any form, was passed. He was supported by Rev. Akuila Yabaki of the Citizens Constitutional Forum, who said that the bill in its entirety was "unconstitutional" and needed to be withdrawn, and if not, challenged in the courts.

== Calls to discipline the military ==
On 29 May, more than 20 military officers, dressed in uniform, sat in the visitors' gallery in Parliament in a silent protest against the legislation. Home Affairs Minister Josefa Vosanibola labelled Bainimarama "arrogant," saying that he was the only military commander in the commonwealth with the effrontery to interfere in political affairs. While conceding that as citizens, soldiers had a right to observe parliamentary proceedings, they should have worn civilian clothes so as to avoid drawing attention to themselves. Attorney-General Qoriniasi Bale called for an investigation into why the officers had been in Parliament during work hours, and into why they had been in uniform.

=== Conservative Alliance calls for Bainimarama to be disciplined ===
The Conservative Alliance (CAMV), the junior partner in Fiji's coalition government, called on Bainimarama and Police Commissioner Andrew Hughes to resign for "making a mockery of (Fiji's) judicial systems," and Home Affairs Minister Vosanibola labelled Bainimarama "arrogant," saying that he was the only military commander in the commonwealth with the effrontery to interfere in political affairs. Bainimarama retorted on 1 June that having undergone three coups in eighteen years, Fiji could not be compared to other commonwealth countries.

On 15 July, Cakobau called for Bainimarama to be disciplined for insubordination, while Jale Baba, National Director of the ruling Soqosoqo Duavata ni Lewenivanua, said that "some of the statements made by Commodore Bainimarama were against the institution he worked for." However, Opposition Leader Mahendra Chaudhry, who had been critical of Bainimarama in the past, supported him this time, saying that the reason why Bainimarama opposed the legislation was that he understood what it was really about.

=== Vosanibola warns Bainimarama ===
On 9 June, Vosanibola reacted to warnings from Bainimarama that the military might be forced to "open up" by reiterating his previous threats to discipline Bainimarama if he failed to act in accordance with government policy and submit any complaints through the correct channels.

On 20 June, the Fiji Times reported that "a reliable source" close to the government had accused President Ratu Josefa Iloilo, as the Military Commander-in-Chief, of refusing repeated requests from Vosanibola to institute disciplinary measures against Bainimarama. The source cited Section 96 of the Constitution, which requires the President to act on the advice of the appropriate Cabinet Minister, in this case the Home Affairs Minister, and accused him of refusing to do so. This, he said, was making the Minister look foolish and incompetent.

On 30 June, Attorney-General Qoriniasi Bale said that there was no problem between the government and the military, but added, "The only problem is an army leadership that thinks it rules the Government when it is supposed to be the other way around." He claimed that measures were underway to resolve the dispute. Bale was responding to concerns raised by the Nadroga-Navosa Provincial Council about the government's passage of controversial legislation in the face of opposition from the military, as well as from foreign governments.

Home Affairs Minister Vosanibola finally admitted on 13 July that the government was constitutionally powerless to do anything to discipline the Military commander. He said that the government was very concerned about Bainimarama's behaviour, and accused the media of exacerbating the tensions. "You (the media) can play a major role and come to us first instead of coming to us after highlighting what he (Bainimarama) has said," Vosanibola told the Fiji Times.

On 15 July, Vosanibola appeared to backtrack somewhat, saying that the government was looking at disciplinary options short of removing the commander from his position. According to the Fiji Times, he admitted having paid several visits to President Iloilo over the matter.

=== Alleged offer to form pro-government mercenary force ===
Also on 15 July, the Fiji Sun newspaper quoted a former soldier, who claims to be an Israeli-trained Fijian security officer, as having met the Prime Minister and the Home Affairs Minister to offer to set up a mercenary force, which he called a "protection squad," to defend the government against any threat from the Military. It would take less than a week to assemble the squad, he was reported as saying. Fiji Live reported that Police Commissioner Andrew Hughes had expressed surprise at the news, saying that as one of the country's top security officers, he knew nothing about the matter. Commodore Bainimarama, for his part, said from New Caledonia that the man was a "loser" who had been dishonourably discharged from the Fijian Army some time before.

On 19 July, the government convened a meeting of the National Security Council, comprising Prime Minister Qarase, Attorney-General Bale, Finance Minister Ratu Jone Kubuabola, Foreign Minister Kaliopate Tavola, and Home Affairs Minister Vosanibola, to discuss the increasing tension between the government and the military. The Ministers emerged from the Council meeting tight-lipped and unwilling to answer questions pertaining to the relationship between the government and the military, except to say that the security situation was "calm" and "stable." Home Affairs Minister Vosanibola said that the government did not need the help of mercenaries, as offered by Raqio. Prime Minister Qarase, for his part, said that he was satisfied with military and police assurances about the security situation. "I would like to reiterate the assurances given by the military and police that the situation in the country is stable," the Prime Minister said. Meanwhile, military spokesman Captain Neumi Leweni said that the military had not provided the Security Council with any briefing.

=== Alleged attempt to dismiss commander ===
On 20 July, Bainimarama went public with allegations that Home Affairs Minister Vosanibola had attempted to dismiss him in June. The Cabinet had, he claimed, discussed a letter of termination presented by Vosanibola. Meanwhile, Radio Australia admitted its embarrassment over a telephone interview conducted, supposedly with Bainimarama, on 18 July. Bainimarama denied having given the interview, and Radio Australia admitted the next day that the person who answered the call, whom they now believed to have been a member of Bainimarama's staff, appeared to have been impersonating him.

=== Further criticism of commander ===
In a parliamentary speech on 10 August, Fisheries Minister Konisi Yabaki accused the opposition Fiji Labour Party of having manipulated the military, as well as the police, to defy the government. He said they had "poisoned the minds of the current leadership in the disciplined forces to publicly express their views against an elected Government without fear of retribution or recrimination."

On 3 October, Prime Minister Qarase called on Bainimarama to respect the authority of the government. He said that Home Affairs Minister Josefa Vosanibola was studying Bainimarama's recent comments, and that the government would duly decide what action to take in response.

== Efforts to defuse the quarrel ==
On 21 June, Bainimarama's predecessors as Military commander, Sitiveni Rabuka (who supports the government's proposed reconciliation commission) and Epeli Ganilau (who opposes it) both called on the government to settle its quarrel with Bainimarama and stop "passing the buck" to the President. Both men, despite their differences, had already defended Bainimarama's right to speak out, because maintaining stability is the responsibility of the Military. "They have a duty to protect the country 24 hours a day and have every right to be part of those observing the tabling of the bill," Rabuka said on 2 June. The day before, Ganilau had said that there was nothing sinister about the military being present to observe the tabling of legislation. Rabuka reiterated on 21 June that Bainimarama was within his rights to speak out, because he would be answerable if anything happened.

Prime Minister Qarase said on 31 July that he and Home Affairs Minister Josefa Vosanibola considered the "Pacific way" of dialogue to be the best option to solve the impasse between the government and the military. He said he was "always available" to enter into dialogue with Commodore Bainimarama.

On 3 August, Prime Minister Qarase said that he was taking urgent steps to resolve the tension with the Military. He would consider, he said, the Military's views. The Prime Minister said that the issue was a very sensitive one, and that people should not think about it emotionally.

On 12 August, Home Affairs Minister Vosanibola insisted that his relationship with the Commodore Bainimarama was good, and that the government was on good terms with the Military. He was looking at ways to resolve the disagreements between the government and the Military, he added. "We will try and smooth the things with the army. I’m looking forward to meet him after this Parliament sitting is over," Vosanibola said.

== Threat to depose the government ==
On 5 June, Bainimarama reiterated his opposition to the proposed reconciliation commission, and said that if the government continued to "bulldoze" it through Parliament, he would be forced to "open up." He did not elaborate on what he meant by that.

On 11 July, Bainimarama issued one of his strongest-worded challenges yet to the government, saying that it was forcing the country into the same anarchy as in 2000. The Reconciliation and Unity Bill would never allow the country to live in peace, he said. In an eight-page statement, he warned that the Military was would take decisive action against any "destabilisers" - among whom he named Attorney-General Bale and Ministry of Reconciliation Chief Executive Apisalome Tudreu. "The military will dish out the same fate we dealt George Speight and his group to anyone whom we think deserves this treatment," Bainimarama said. He said that he would arrest and put on trial anyone who threatened the stability of Fiji.

Home Affairs Minister Vosanibola said in response to Bainimarama's latest attack that it was hurting the fine reputation of the Fijian army, which he said was "a global power" in peacemaking - but which suffered from a present leadership that he saw as "questionable." He called on Bainimarama to respect the rule of law and the parliamentary process. Vosanibola did not, however, repeat previous threats to discipline Bainimarama.

The next day, it was revealed that a draft document signed by Commodore Bainimarama had originally contained a direct threat to overthrow the government if the bill went through. "The RFMF must stop the Bill from passing or get rid of the Government if it is passed. We can recover without this government, we cannot recover from this Bill," said part of an emboldened paragraph, which was edited out of the document, part of the Military's draft submission to the parliamentary committee considering the bill, before publication. The document accused Prime Minister Qarase and Attorney-General Bale of playing the race card deliberately for political reasons.

On 28 July, Bainimarama denied media reports that the Military had been on high alert since the introduction of the bill. The reports surfaced in the light of revelations that security had been tightened at the Queen Elizabeth Barracks in the Suva suburb of Nabua, and that security for President Iloilo had also been strengthened. Bainimarama's denial followed a report by Television New Zealand on 26 July that Fiji's intelligence service was being put on high alert to counter coup threats from the Military.

=== Police tighten security ===
The acting Assistant Superintendent of Police, Unaisi Vuniwaqa, said on 3 August that the police regarded the Military as a possible threat to national stability if the controversial legislation passed, and had taken steps to improve the security of the Parliamentary complex, with checkpoints being set up and plainclothes policemen and Tactical Response Unit guards posted. No one would be admitted to the complex without producing identity cards or receiving confirmation of their business from within the parliamentary secretariat. Military reservists working with the police had also been asked to state which body, Military or police, their allegiance lay with. "It's been something that has been on-going even before the Bill and we just wanted to gauge how many men we could rely on in case of emergency," Vuniwaqa said.

The same day, Colonel Rabukawaqa denied that there were any plans to overthrow the government. The earlier eight-page memo making such threats that had been leaked to the press was, he said, only a draft. It was "just a thought" that the Military leadership had considered but not taken further, and should not be taken seriously, he said.

== Parliamentary submission ==
In its parliamentary submission on 29 June, the military claimed that its integrity would be undermined by the passage of the legislation. It expressed concern that soldiers jailed for their involvement in the 2000 coup and the mutinies that accompanied and followed it could be released under the bill's amnesty provisions, which would undermine military discipline and weaken the integrity of the military as an institution. The constitutional power of Commodore Bainimarama as Commander, as the person responsible for discipline, would also be degraded, the submission said. "The events of 2000 showed that the schism that split the military, the country, judiciary, the police and even families was embedded and took over four years to expunge," the statement said. "Any move such as the use of amnesty to allow convicted soldiers to re-enter the rank and file of the military will violate the very basis upon which the strength of the military lies."

== Incident at the Fiji Law Society ==
The Fiji Times reported on 3 July (Monday) that Bainimarama had turned down an invitation to address the Fiji Law Society over the weekend. Chief Justice Daniel Fatiaki confirmed that Bainimarama had been scheduled to speak. Bainimarama was said to be angry with Law Society President Graeme Leung, a fellow-opponent of the Reconciliation and Unity Bill, for saying that opposing the legislation was not the prerogative of the military. Meanwhile, it was reported on 5 July that Bainimarama had called the legislation a form of "ethnic cleansing".

== Lobbying the villages, provinces, chiefs ==
On 21 June, Bainimarama announced that his officers would spend the following six weeks visiting villages to inform the population of the military's perception of the bill, which they had translated into Fijian. The announcement was met with immediate opposition from the Kadavu Provincial Council, which supports the legislation. The council's youth coordinator, Sitiveni Qio, said that soldiers campaigning against the bill would not be welcome in Kadavu.

Bainimarama said on 24 August that more than 400 villages around Fiji had informed the visiting Military teams that they were opposed to the bill. He stressed that the Military would not allow any more coups to take place in Fiji.

=== Reaction to bill's endorsement by provincial councils ===
On 26 July, Bainimarama declared that the military would continue to oppose the legislation, despite its endorsement by the Councils of all fifteen Provinces and dependencies. He said that the bill was "morally, ethically, and legally wrong," and that the military would never support it. The Provincial Council representatives who supported the bill were the same people who supported George Speight in 2000, he claimed. Addressing more than 700 soldiers at a passing out parade, he said that reconciliation could not be legislated and could succeed only if it came from the hearts of those responsible for the crime. Passage of the Unity Bill would, he predicted, undermine the four arms of government - the police, the Department of Public Prosecutions, the Judiciary, and the Military, and would lead people to believe that they could get away acts of treason. If so, there would be no end to the culture of coups, he said. He concluded by quoting from the Bible that one reaps what one sows.

=== Address to the Great Council of Chiefs ===
Addressing a special meeting of the Great Council of Chiefs in Lami on 28 July, Bainimarama said that the legislation would strip the Military of its ability to carry out its responsibilities in an emergency and would weaken national security. In a 31-page speech that took more than an hour to deliver, he accused the government of harbouring in its ranks persons involved in coup-related crimes in 2000. "Who's promoting the Bill? These are people in the current Government who participated in the 2000 coup. Some have been convicted, others are facing trial, there are still others left whom the long arm of the law should get at."

The commander took pains to emphasize, however, that the Military was not against the government. The issue, as he saw it, was the rule of law, not the government of the day. "The Bill will legitimise the 2000 coup and will weaken the law and order agencies," he said. "All the good work of rebuilding Fiji to what it is today will be undone." The world community would see a country that condones law-breakers, he maintained. "Why should only a few people be freed and not others when we are all serving under the same law? he asked rhetorically.

His speech, laced with quotes from the Bible, urged the chiefs to "do right in the eyes of God" and reject the bill. "If you honourable chiefs agree that those involved in the coup be forgiven, it will prove that we support the wrong and will be at odds with the integrity of God," he declared. The commander criticized the Methodist Church for supporting the bill. "When we wrong God, he does not let us go ... When God's people (Jews) wronged him, he weakened them in battle and caused them to be captives in Babylon for 70 years," he stated. He considered that reconciliation would be possible only after justice had been served.

He reminded the chiefs that in 2000, they had not agreed to forgive the perpetrators of the coup, but had insisted that justice should take its course. He urged them to stand by that decision now. The commander did not get his way, however, as the Great Council ended up endorsing the bill, though with the qualification that the government should "consider" the objections raised by its opponents, including the Military.

Bainimarama ended his address by reminding the chiefs that in 2000, they had not agreed to forgive the perpetrators of the coup, but had insisted that justice should take its course. He urged them to stand by that decision now. He closed by quoting Amos 5,24: "Let justice roll on like a river, righteousness like a never-falling stream."

=== Bainimarama criticizes chiefs ===
On 29 July, Bainimarama issued a statement critical of the chiefs' decision to support the bill. He accused them of forgetting the decision they had made in 2000, that justice should take its course. "It is sad that they had forgotten that wise decision and have also forgotten the rest of the multi-racial society within which we live," Bainimarama said. He reiterated that the bill was legally, morally, and ethically wrong, and that it condoned the unlawful events of 2000. He said that the chiefs' decision had alienated a large portion of society, and though he accepted that the decision had been taken, that the Military would continue to oppose the legislation. "We will rather air these concerns now than be called in to try to rebuild a society that has been devastated by civil upheaval for this is where we see our destiny if we continue down this path with the Bill," he said.

The commander said on 24 August that he was not surprised that the Great Council of Chiefs and the Methodist Church had both endorsed the controversial legislation, as some senior members of both institutions had supported the coup perpetrators in 2000, he alleged. His assertions were supported by former Prime Minister Sitiveni Rabuka - who happens to be a supporter of the legislation.

== Disagreement with Australian government ==
Australian Foreign Minister Alexander Downer visited Fiji for two days of talks, from 28 to 30 September. Downer expressed strong reservations about the legislation, but also rebuked the Fijian Military for "playing politics." Downer's comments provoked an angry reaction from Bainimarama, who said that Australians had never had to live through a coup and therefore cannot understand what it is like.

== Disagreement with Methodist Church ==
In 2005, Commodore Bainimarama strongly criticized some sections of the Methodist Church for supporting the Unity Bill, and said that in future, all pastors seeking chaplaincy assignments with Fijian military personnel travelling to the Middle East would be required to state their position on the legislation. Supporters of it need not apply, he said.

== Rabukawaqa speaks out ==
Military spokesman Lieutenant Colonel Orisi Rabukawaqa said on 1 August that it was not fair to expect taxpayers to foot the bill to compensate coup victims. Those seeking amnesty should pay, he said. Coup perpetrators would learn nothing from their mistakes, he said, if they were released without being required to compensate their victims. He defended the outspokenness of the Military on the bill. "We (the military) had always been called all over the globe to restore peace in other countries and we are only saying this because we do not want to do it in our own country," he said.

On 3 September, spokesman Rabukawaqa insisted that the Military was not opposed to the Qarase government as such, but only to the controversial Unity Bill, which he said had security implications. He also said that to offer pardons to only one category of criminal was inconsistent. "If we are going to forgive people, why don't we just forgive everybody and let everybody out of prison." He said that the Military opposed the principle of compensation to coup victims being paid by the taxpayer; rather the perpetrators should be held accountable, he said.

The Military had learned its lesson from the 1987 coups, Rabukawaqa said. Then, they had deposed the government of Timoci Bavadra (who was supported mostly by Indo-Fijian voters) in support of the Fijian ethno-nationalist cause, but later came to realize that they had been used. Those responsible for the 1987 coups cannot now be prosecuted, because Sitiveni Rabuka, the chief instigator of the coups who later became Prime Minister, had presided over a rewriting of the Constitution and had ensured the insertion of amnesty provisions. "History unfortunately teaches that if you come out successful, you can rewrite the books to reflect well on you and poorly on others," Rabukawaqa said.

== No pardon for Speight - military ==
On 6 November, Captain Leweni reiterated the Military's total opposition to any possible pardon for the coup's front man, George Speight. Leweni's public statement coincided with an Australian Broadcasting Corporation interview with Commodore Bainimarama on its Asia Pacific program. Bainimarama vowed that Speight would never be released, and called the bill a "gimmick" to win the votes of Speight sympathizers. His own greatest challenge, he said, was to hold the loyalty of his troops.

The two military statements provoked a mixed reaction from politicians and other public figures. Home Affairs Minister Josefa Vosanibola declined to comment until he had seen Bainimarama's interview. Deputy Commissioner of Prisons Opeti Laladidi defended the Commander's right to speak his mind, but Cabinet Minister Samisoni Tikoinasau, Speight's older brother, said that Bainimarama's comments could take the country backwards and that he should be more cautious. He asserted that the government would not back down in the face of "threats" from the Military. Attorney-General Qoriniasi Bale, for his part, thought it unlikely that the legislation would be used to pardon Speight, as it made a pardon conditional on the person seeking it making a complete confession about who planned and financed the crisis. Speight has repeatedly refused to make any statement to that effect.

=== Kotobalavu pleads with Bainimarama ===
On 22 December 2005, the chief executive officer in the Prime Minister's Department, Joji Kotobalavu, pleaded with the Military not to use or threaten force to stop the Unity Bill. His appeal came in the wake of another public refusal from the Military commander to accept the legislation. "The RTU Bill is not going to happen," he defiantly declared at a press conference the previous day.

Soqosoqo Duavata ni Lewenivanua (SDL) General Secretary Jale Baba challenged Commodore Bainimarama to pursue his opposition to the bill through political, rather than military, channels. "He should join a political party and see if they will vote him in," Baba declared.

The Commander found support, however, from National Alliance Party President Ratu Epeli Ganilau and from Ema Druavesi, General Secretary of the Soqosoqo ni Vakavulewa ni Taukei (SVT), which ruled Fiji from 1992 through 1999. She accused the government of promoting the bill for "deliberate and dishonest motives," alleging that its real purpose was to release all coup convicts. She also charged that public servants Anare Jale, Joji Kotobalavu, and Lesi Korovavala, along with the Attorney-General's Office, seemed to have a personal dislike for the Commander.

== Parliamentary vote delayed ==
Prime Minister Qarase announced on 18 January that the tabling of the legislation for final parliamentary approval was being postponed until further notice, pending "consultations."

This move followed an extraordinary week which had seen unusual troop and naval deployments, rumours of a possible coup, and the dismissal of Acting Land Force Commander Lieutenant Colonel Jone Baledrokadroka for alleged insubordination, culminating in a meeting at Government House (the official residence of the President between the Prime Minister and Commodore Bainimarama under the auspices of Vice-President Ratu Joni Madraiwiwi on 16 January. In a statement issued after the meeting, Madraiwiwi said that the Prime Minister had agreed to consider the grievances of the Military and to consult them about possible changes to the legislation. This was not clarified further at the time, but on the 18th, the Prime Minister went further and said that the process of consulting everybody could take a long time, and that it could no longer be guaranteed that the legislation would be passed in time for the 2006 parliamentary election. The same was true of other controversial bills opposed by the Military, including legislation defining indigenous fishing rights and establishing a separate indigenous court system, Qarase said.

Jioji Kotobalavu, the chief executive officer of the Prime Minister's Department, said that the bill was being revised, and that the Military would be briefed when the revision had been completed.

== Military still opposed ==
Captain Leweni reiterated the Military's opposition to the bill 16 February 2006. The Military would never allow it to become law, he vowed. "As far as the RFMF (Military) is concerned the RTU Bill is a non-issue as we have promised it will not eventuate," he said. Commodore Bainimarama later endorsed Leweni's comments, which followed a statement from the Prime Minister that the bill had not been abandoned and would not be.

Early in March 2006, the Military warned the government not to reintroduce the bill should it win reelection on 6–13 May. The Military also advised the Great Council of Chiefs to pursue no further discussion of the bill, a charge rejected by Great Council General Secretary Asesela Sadole.

== 2006 military coup ==
In late November 2006, Bainimarama handed down a list of demands to Qarase, one of which was the withdrawal of three controversial bills, including the Reconciliation, Tolerance, and Unity Bill.

On 5 December, Bainimarama overthrew the government. Addressing the media to explain his actions, he stated that the Reconciliation Bill had to be prevented as it would have "undermined the Constitution". He later added that, if the SDL party returned to power, he would tolerate it only as long as it did not attempt to re-introduce the Bill. "If you do it, I'll remove you," he warned.

== See also ==
- Fiji Truth and Reconciliation Commission
- Qualified positions on the bill
- Military opposition to the bill
- International reaction to the bill
