= Religious reaction to the Reconciliation, Tolerance, and Unity Bill =

Many community organizations in Fiji were vocal in reaction to the Reconciliation, Tolerance, and Unity Bill, proposed legislation in 2005 which included a controversial "amnesty" clause allowing certain government members to pardon perpetrators of the failed coup d'état in 2000. These organizations included religious groups in Fiji.

Religion plays an important role in Fijian society. Indigenous Fijians are overwhelmingly Christian, predominantly Methodist but with significant Roman Catholic, Assemblies of God, Seventh-day Adventist, and other Christian minorities; Indo-Fijians are mostly Hindu, with a large Muslim as well as a smaller Christian minority.

The Methodist Church endorsed the bill (with a faction dissenting), Hindu organizations opposed it, as did the Roman Catholic Church and a number of other religious groups. Several religious groups took more nuanced positions, calling for dialogue, negotiation, and good will.

== The Methodist Church ==
The Methodist Church announced its support for the bill on 19 July, according to the Rev. Timoci Nawaciono, head of the church's Nasea circuit. Methodist support was much coveted by the government, as almost two-thirds of indigenous Fijians are affiliated to the denomination. Nawaciono acknowledged, however, that Methodist support for the legislation was far from unanimous, and said that on 24 July, all parishioners will be asked to complete forms stating their individual opinions on it. On 1 August, the church announced that a majority of its members had voted in favour of the bill.

On 21 July, the Rev. Iliesa Naivalu of the Methodist Church's Department of Christian Citizenship and Social Services said that the imprisonment of coup perpetrators was having a devastating effect on their families. The Reconciliation, Tolerance, and Unity Bill was a positive way forward, he said, as it would give the families of the coup perpetrators the chance to lead normal lives once more. He called for "righteous justice" which would look at a human being in totality.

Addressing a special meeting of the Great Council of Chiefs on 28 July, Naivalu said that the Methodist Church supported the bill for the sake of the country's chiefs. He said that reconciliation and forgiveness were an integral part of Fijian culture, and should be upheld. "We support the Bill as it provides a restorative justice system which has more in common with Pacific cultural practices of dispute settlement, reconciliation and forgiveness," he said. He cautioned that retributive justice would not heal the nation's wounds. "While the retributive justice system and imprisonment may have served the purpose of punishing offenders, it will not lead to healing and reconciliation," Naivalu said. While acknowledging that some chiefs had been convicted and imprisoned on coup-related offenses, he insisted that "they were acting in accordance with their prescribed role according to customary practices."

The endorsement of the legislation by the Methodist Church has brought the church into conflict with the Military, which has threatened to ban Methodist ministers from serving as military chaplains with Fijian troops travelling overseas.

On 11 October, Naivalu said that at its annual conference in Nadi, the Methodist Church had accepted the legislation "in its entirety," a decision that he said was binding on both ministers and parishioners. He clarified, however, that the decision to endorse the bill was for its own sake and should not be interpreted as a vote of support for the Qarase government. Methodists were free to support any political party they wished, he said.

=== Dissident Methodists opposed ===
Dissident voices led by Rev. Josateki Koroi, a former President of the Methodist Church of Fiji and Rotuma, have made it clear that not all Methodists endorse the stance of their present leadership. Koroi spoke out on 7 June, saying that reconciliation must allow for differences of race, culture, and religion. "Reconciliation", he said, had become an over-used cliché, which people used without understanding properly what it meant. "By definition there has to be a wrongdoer and a victim. To reconcile the difference, the wrongdoer must show remorse and true repentance, however, trivial. And the victim should be willing to forgive the wrongdoer," a point Koroi said was lost on the government. He said that if the reconciliation theory was based on the simplistic assumption that race was the issue, it was "on shaky ground."

Koroi reiterated this position more forcefully on 28 June. He said that he believed that the intent of the bill was good, but that it missed a key point essential to reconciliation: that there has to be genuine repentance on the part of the wrongdoer. He said that the perpetrators of the coup, whom he called "thugs," showed no sign of repentance for "their treacherous deeds," and that there could be no reconciliation without it. "Sadly, the Ministry of Reconciliation with its good intentions has not identified its key points," he said.

Rev. Ame Tugaue, the General Secretary of the church, rejected such sentiments and said on 19 October that "all Christians" supported the Unity Bill. He strongly criticized Koroi's dissident group for making a negative submission to the parliamentary committee studying the legislation. "Reconciliation is God's programme and everything will go a long way if people put aside their differences and focus on reconciliation," he asserted, saying that the Unity Bill was an effective tool towards realizing that goal. The submission to which Tugaue objected maintained that the church and civil government are both instituted by God, but given different spheres of responsibility, and that it was wrong for either institution to interfere with the other. The biblical command to forgive was given to believers as individuals, not the state, said the submission. Tugaue rejected this, saying that the dissidents' submission presented a bad image of the church, especially to indigenous Fijians. The Methodist church supported the bill and would continue to do so, no matter what objections were raised by others, Tugaue said.

Tugaue's comments were a reversal of his earlier stance, articulated on 9 July, that the church was reserving judgement until it had finished consulting its members. In that earlier statement, Tugaue had said that the church supported the goal reconciliation but was opposed to any interference with the course of justice.

== The Roman Catholic Church ==
Archbishop Petero Mataca of the Roman Catholic Church spoke out against the bill on 22 June, reversing earlier support for it - support that he claimed had been based on a misleading presentation from the Prime Minister before the legislation was made public. On May 2, Mataca said, Prime Minister Qarase had addressed a delegation from the Fiji Council of Churches. "The presentation by the Prime Minister painted the Bill in a very positive light and we voiced our support," Mataca said. The presentation had been entirely oral, with no copy of the bill being produced, and the Prime Minister did not tell the church leaders about the amnesty clauses.

Mataca called the overthrow of a democratically elected government a serious crime, and said that "the coup cycle" would continue unless those involved faced the consequences of their crimes. "I publicly appeal to our President, our Prime Minister and the members of our Government to withdraw the Bill until such time as proper consultations can be held and appropriate amendments made," Mataca said. Reconciliation and unity could not come from a politically motivated bill, he warned. On the contrary, he saw reconciliation as a healing process that must start with truth telling, confession of wrongdoing, genuine request for forgiveness and willingness to accept the consequences of one's actions. "It seems ... that the Bill has been hastily put together for political purposes - especially in view of the elections next year," Mataca said. "This is not in the interests of the country and any stubborn effort by the Government to push through this Bill will be counter productive and will threaten Fiji's future stability."

On 23 June, the Prime Minister's office put out a statement denying that he had expressly asked the church leaders for their support, contradicting Mataca's assertions. He had, the statement said, merely wanted to inform them of his intentions. According to the statement, Qarase spoke from typed notes - a claim denied by Bishop Apimeleki Qiliho, President of the Fiji Council of Churches, who said that the Prime Minister had not made a speech at the meeting, but had distributed copies of a speech instead.

Roman Catholic Vicar-General Father Ben Kaloudau reiterated the opposition of his church to the legislation on 2 August. The church believed that the bill was not based on Christian principles. Justice should be followed and all coup perpetrators should be held accountable for they actions, he added. This represented a hardening of Kaloudau's earlier position, which had been critical of both supporters and opponents of the legislation and had called on the Military to follow the proper channels in voicing its opposition to the bill.

Paula Baba, a lay member of the Columbans missionary society, spoke out against the bill on 24 June, calling it a form of "cheap reconciliation" which totally contradicted the concept of restorative justice. "Victims would only be compensated if people that had committed crimes against them were granted amnesty. This is cheap reconciliation," he said. He said that it gave victims of the coup "second position" behind its perpetrators, and that its true purpose was to protect persons currently in positions of power, so that they could remain in those positions "without breaking a sweat."

=== Dissident Catholics support ===
Not all Catholics agreed with their leadership. Kelepi Lesi, vice-president of the Catholic League, endorsed the bill in a parliamentary submission on 30 June. Contradicting his own Archbishop, Petero Mataca, Lesi said the bill promoted principles of forgiveness and healing that were very much in line with the teachings of the Catholic Church, and he called on Catholics to support it. "Let us all support Prime Minister Laisenia Qarase's-led government to take a lead role — to change the cause of history to prosperity, position our country as the paragon of multi-cultural society, sculpture the contours of our future, chisel away the rough edges of our society and carve it to perfection," he said.

== Hindu groups ==
- On May 21, Surendra Kumar, president the Shree Sanatan Dharm Pratindhi Sabha Fiji, a Hindu organization, called the bill a dangerous precedent which could cause further upheavals in future with a provision for amnesty at the end. He called for the rule of law to be followed and for perpetrators of the coup to face justice like everybody else who breaks the law. He also expressed concern that pursuing the legislation against the wishes of the Military could provoke military intervention.
- Kamlesh Arya, President of the Arya Pratinidhi Sabha, a Hindu organization, said on 12 June that by promoting restorative justice against retributive justice, the legislation, if passed, would undermine the rule of law. He said that restorative justice should bring relief to the victims rather than the perpetrators of the coup. On 23 June Arya complained that his organization had not been invited to the May 2 meeting that Prime Minister Qarase called with church leaders to present his version of what the bill was about.
- Moti Chand Maharaj, a Hindu priest from Tauvegavega in Ba Province, told the parliamentary committee studying the bill that it looked more like a terrorist bill than a unifying bill. "It seems the Government wants more coups and mutinies and the motive of this Bill is to release the coup makers of the year 2000," he said. "What we can say is that the Government wants to legalise terrorism in this country." He condemned the government for failing to listen to the military and the police and said that a great sin was being committed against the people of Fiji. "God will never allow you to reconcile with your sin, which you have committed upon the people," he said.

== Other religious groups ==
- Salvation Army Regional Commander Major Gordon Daly said that Qarase had said nothing about the amnesty clauses at a May 2 meeting with religious leaders. Those present had hailed the legislation as "a great idea for reconciliation" until they learned about the amnesty provisions through the media two days later.
- Tessa MacKenzie of the Council of Interfaith Search Fiji said on 28 June that allowing people involved in the 2000 coup to escape punishment would threaten the future well-being of the nation. Presenting the Council's submission to Parliament's Justice, Law and Order committee, MacKenzie said that forgiveness could happen only if the offenders publicly admitted their guilt and sought forgiveness.
- Esala Tuibua of the Jesus Christ Apostolic Church spoke forcefully against the bill on 1 August. He called it a "very unchristian piece of document" which put all the doctrines of Christianity to the test. The only true Christian stand, he said, was the one being taken by the Military in opposing the legislation. Reconciliation could not be legislated, he said, and for those who were disposed towards it, laws promoting it were superfluous. "The reconciliation, tolerance and unity already entrenched in the Bible is more than enough for us to do the only thing left for us to do - to be doers of the Word and not only hear it and deceive ourselves," he declared. He called on Christians to reexamine their doctrine in trying to assume they knew the will of God.
- Jehovah's Witnesses spokesman Taito Tabaleka said on 13 October that reconciliation is a two-way process, and that unless both parties see eye to eye, the legislation will fail to serve its purpose.
- The Assemblies of God President, Reverend Pita Cili, said on 2 July that his church supported the reconciliation provisions of the bill, but was far less positive about the amnesty provisions. The Assemblies would support the bill, Cili said, only if it did not contravene the constitution and laws of Fiji.
- Prison Fellowship director Jack Simpson said on 15 May that he supported principles of reconciliation set out in the bill, but believed that legislation and force were the wrong way to achieve them. "It is right that victims be compensated, if possible, by the perpetrator. It is also right that victims play a significant role in issuing amnesty since they were the ones hurt. They will need to forgive their perpetrators if they are to be released from the guilt and hurt they brought on their soul because of their crimes against others." He added, however, that forgiveness comes from the heart and therefore cannot be forced or legislated.
- Eliki Lalauvaki of the Fiji Brethren Assemblies Partnership (a denominated associated with the Plymouth Brethren) spoke out on 13 June, saying that reconciliation was a worthy goal but should not be forced on the people, as there needed to be a willingness of the heart for it to take place.
- Rev. Immanuel Reuben, Superintendent of the Indian Division of the Methodist Church, said on 26 July that if the true purpose of the legislation was to provide amnesty, it should be applicable to all prisoners, not just those incarcerated on coup-related charges. "We believe the prisons should be cleaned out if amnesty is provided and everyone in prison be given amnesty," he said. Ten submissions from the Indian Division would be presented to the church's Bill Committee, he said, ahead of the committee's submission to the parliamentary Justice, Law and Order sector committee.
- The Fiji Council of Churches called on the government and the Military to respect and understand each other's positions. Rev. Isireli Kacimaiwai, the General Secretary of the Council, said on 25 October that supporters and opponents of the legislation both evidently wanted to move the country forwards, but disagreed on the method. He said that the President of the Council, Bishop Apimeleki Qiliho, had met with Military Commander Commodore Frank Bainimarama with a view to fostering a better relationship between the government and the Military.

== See also ==
- Fiji Truth and Reconciliation Commission
- Qualified positions on the bill
- Military opposition to the bill
- International reaction to the bill
- Church involvement in Fiji coups
