= Military–church relations in Fiji =

The Republic of Fiji Military Forces (RFMF) has always had a close relationship between the country's churches, particularly the Methodist Church, to which some two-thirds of indigenous Fijians belong. Relations became strained in 2005, however, over the church's support for the government's controversial Reconciliation and Unity Commission, which the Military strongly opposes. The Bill seeks to establish Commission empowered to compensate victims and pardon perpetrators of the coup d'état which deposed the elected government of Prime Minister, Mahendra Chaudhry in May 2000. In 2017 the military claimed that statements by the church could lead to unrest.

== Infantry Day, 2005 ==
In an Infantry Day speech at Mount Nakobalevu outside Suva on 23 June, Bainimarama told 400 infanteers that he expected political instability to continue, and that in the event of an upheaval, they should follow his orders and no one else's. He told soldiers to stay away from people who opposed the stance of the military on what he called matters of national interest, and to change churches if their minister's views conflicted with those of the military. He also asserted that if Fijian chiefs were giving wrong advice to their people, the military had a duty to correct them.

Land Force Commander Colonel Ioane Naivalurua called Bainimarama "courageous, strong, and ... a saviour of Fiji in this time of need." But Methodist Church spokesman Rev. Iliesa Naivalu strongly rebuked him for calling on soldiers to switch churches if their minister preached against the army. "No leader in his right frame of mind urges his people to change their churches simply because of a Bill," he said on 29 June. "To do so is a breach of an individual's constitutional right to express their faith by joining a church of their choice." He accused Bainimarama of lacking wisdom and respect, the true foundation of sound leadership.

== "Chaplains supporting the bill not welcome" - Bainimarama ==
On 1 October 2005, Commodore Bainimarama warned the Methodist Church, to which some two-thirds of indigenous Fijians belong, that their support for the Unity Bill would jeopardize their right to supply chaplains to Fijian soldiers performing United Nations peacekeeping duties in the Middle East. "We will not be soft when it comes to the bill," he warned. "I will not allow the pastors who support the bill to relay a different message to my troops, especially when the military is not for the bill." He said that clergy seeking to travel with the troops would be required to state their attitude to the legislation, and that supporters of it need not apply. If the Methodist Church as a whole continued to endorse the bill, Bainimarama said he would ban all Methodist ministers from overseas chaplaincy roles and recruit Assemblies of God or All Nation Church ministers instead.

Assemblies of God General Secretary Reverend Apete Tanoa responded by saying that while his denomination would appreciate being offered chaplaincy assignments with the Military, it would not want to get involved in a dispute between the Military and the Methodist Church.

On 2 October, Reverend Ame Tugawe, the General Secretary of the Methodist Church, said he was "in total shock" at the Commander's attack on the church. "He is not only speaking about the people in the church but also about the God which we all serve," Tugawe said. "I have spoken with the military chaplain and told him to inform the military not to make such comments against the church." He said the threat was unprecedented and he could not have imagined it.

Tugawe reiterated the church's support for the Unity Bill: "We support reconciliation and the comments (Bainimarama's) would not do it," he said. "I advise the commander not to vent his anger in such public comments." He said, however, that it was a matter of personal conscience whether a minister supported or opposed the legislation, and that the question should not be a factor in the appointment of military chaplains.

Captain Neumi Leweni, the Army's Media Liaison Officer, said on 4 October that the Military had principles to uphold, and therefore there would be no compromise on the Unity Bill. Contrary to Reverend Tugawe's assertions, the threatened ban on chaplains out of favour with the Military was not unprecedented, Leweni said. The Military was not speaking against the Methodist Church, he insisted, but was stating its own position.

== Lasaro arrested in 2009 ==
In November 2009, following threats by the military, senior Methodist minister Reverend Manasa Lasaro preached a sermon against the military and was arrested soon after. Lasaro was released after two days.

== Methodist conference cancelled ==
In 2011 the military cancelled the annual Methodist conference saying it was too political.

== See also ==
- Fiji Truth and Reconciliation Commission
- Qualified positions on the bill
- Military opposition to the bill
- International reaction to the bill
