= Dorsami Naidu =

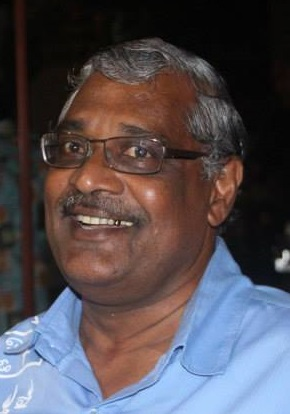
Dorsami Naidu

Dorsami Naidu is a Fijian lawyer and former politician. On 29 July 2005, he announced his intention to resign as President of the National Federation Party (NFP) at the party conference on 31 July.

Naidu took over the leadership of the NFP, once the main political party appealing to the Indo-Fijian community, when it was in a state of disarray following its poor showing in the parliamentary elections of 1999 and 2001. Naidu had a reputation as a dynamic organizer who undertook a major drive to rejuvenate the party and broaden its appeal to indigenous Fijians, women, and the disadvantaged. In mid-2005, he was at the forefront of a major campaign against a controversial bill being promoted by the Fijian government, that aimed to establish a Commission with the power to compensate victims and pardon perpetrators of the civilian coup d'état which deposed the elected government in May 2000.

Announcing his resignation, Naidu expressed disappointment at how the party's general secretary, Pramod Rae, had gone public with calls for him to step down. The NFP was not a media-led party, he said, and he was "disappointed and hurt" that Rae had gone to the media despite a private assurance from Naidu that he would resign soon. Rae should have called a meeting of the executive board before making such a unilateral decision, Naidu said. On 31 July, the party conference elected Raman Pratap Singh to replace him.

Naidu declared that he still supported the NFP, despite his "betrayal" by a number of party officials, and that he would remain available to them if ever called upon.

== President of Fiji Law Society ==
Naidu was elected President of the Fiji Law Society on 27 September 2008, succeeding Isireli Fa. He was to hold this position until 14 June 2014. In 2009, he was arrested and released without charge for speaking against the military coup which deposed the civilian government on 5 December 2006, and the abrogation of the constitution in April 2009.

Naidu also served as President of the Then India Sanmarga Ikya Sangam (TISI), a Hindu organization for Indo-Fijians of South Indian descent from 2001 to 2012. He founded the Sangam School of Nursing in Labasa.
