= Thomas McCosker v The State =

Legal case before the High Court of Fiji

McCosker (sic) v The State
- Court: High Court of Fiji
- Full case name: Criminal Appeal Case Nos.: HAA0085 & 86 OF 2005 between: DHIRENDRA NADAN and THOMAS MCCOSKER Appellants and: STATE Respondent
- Decided: 2005-08-26
- Citation: PacLII

Court membership
- Judge sitting: Gerard Winter

Thomas McCosker v The State was a criminal appeal case before the High Court of Fiji.

Thomas McCosker, an Australian, visited Fiji in March 2005. He was subsequently arrested, tried and sentenced to two years' jail for sodomy. An appeal was raised on the basis of Fiji's constitution outlawing discrimination on the basis of sexual orientation. On Friday 26 August 2005, his conviction, and that of Dhirendra Nadan, the other man involved, was overturned on constitutional grounds.

Anti-sodomy laws were found to be incompatible with the country's 1997 Constitutional Bill of Rights. The debate over what conduct is culturally acceptable was at the heart of the constitutional arguments which were presented during the McCoskar High Court case (Nadan & McCoskar v State also cited as DPP v Nadan and McCoskar) and raised questions about the values enshrined in the country's Bill of Rights. The Constitution of Fiji was adopted in 1997 with a mandate to break the racially divisive legacy of the Fiji coups of 1987. Section 43, concerned the respect of traditional Fijian cultural values, in particular traditional titles, obligations, customs and ceremonies. It was designed to protect the specific interests of the indigenous Fijian communities. While the Methodist church in particular has always argued that homosexuality offends it on a cultural level, and it is not culturally appropriate for Fiji, the High Court disagreed with those arguments. The case is being seen as a victory for gay rights, in a country whose colonial legacy is dominated by strict Methodist values. (Most ethnic Fijians generally regard themselves as Christians, with approximately 65 per cent belonging to the Methodist faith.)

Unusually among common law countries, section 43 of the Fijian Constitution requires that the Fiji Bill of Rights be interpreted in light of "public international law" and so it was necessary for Judge Winter to call on this body of international standards in deciding the case. The judgment calls very heavily on international standards and the way in which courts in other parts of the world have dealt with these issues.

The Fiji Human Rights Commission submitted that sections 175 (a) and (c) and 177 of the Fiji Penal Code had become invalid immediately after the 1997 Constitution came into effect. In its submission, the Commission also stated that sections 175 (a) and (c) and 177 of the Penal Code were contrary to Section 38 (2) of the Constitution as it unfairly discriminated on the ground of sexual orientation. All human rights cases on this point internationally, including in South Africa, have come to similar conclusions. The Commission also submitted that this was really a case of prosecution for the wrong offence and that the relevant authorities should have considered charging McCoskar and Nandan for trafficking in pornography under section 188 of the Penal Code.

The Fiji Human Rights Commission stated in relation to this case:

Trafficking in obscene publications is part of a larger picture of trafficking in persons. This involves the illegal trade in human beings and a modern form of slavery. Many victims of human trafficking are subjected to force, fraud, or coercion for the purpose of sexual exploitation and forced labour.

Trafficking in persons is a gross violation of human rights. It violates the universal human right to life, liberty, and freedom from slavery in all its forms.

McCoskar in mitigation in the Magistrates Court had accepted that the photographs he took were intended for sale on the internet. Fiji has ratified the Agreement for the Suppression of the Circulation of Obscene Publications. As such, the Fijian Government is obliged to play its role in helping curb the rising problem of trafficking in pornography and sexual exploitation of vulnerable groups of people, especially those who are poor.

McCoskar told the Melbourne newspaper The Age: "I would have liked the Australian Government to have taken more interest in my case". The Australian government offered the usual consular assistance, but did not condemn the sentence. Amnesty International and Human Rights Watch had both condemned the conviction.

== See also ==
- LGBT rights in Fiji
- List of Australians imprisoned or executed abroad
- Religious reaction to the Reconciliation, Tolerance, and Unity Bill
