= Raman Pratap Singh =

Fijian politician and lawyer (1950–2020)

Raman Pratap Singh (6 June 1950 – 18 May 2020) was a Fijian lawyer and politician of Indian descent.

== Early life ==
Singh was born on 6 June 1950 in Buabua. He graduated with a law degree in 1977 and began working as a lawyer in 1978. He was a director on the Sugar Cane Growers Council and member of the Fiji Sugar Commission. In 1982, he began working as a town clerk for Labasa Town Council.

== Political career ==
Raman contested the 1994 election on the National Federation Party (NFP) ticket, winning the Bua Indian seat in the House of Representatives.

Singh was elected President of the mostly Indo-Fijian National Federation Party (NFP) on 31 July 2005, replacing Dorsami Naidu, who resigned facing sexual assault charges (of which he was subsequently acquitted). Singh's immediate task was to fight the parliamentary election, held on 6–13 May 2006, with the hope of regaining representation for the NFP, which it lost in the 1999 election. The attempt was a failure, with the party dropping to just 6 percent of the vote, its lowest to date.

Singh resigned as NFP president on 29 March 2014, citing the need for "new blood" and "fresh faces" in the party leadership. He attempted to regain his seat for the NFP at the 2014 election in September, but was not successful.

Singh died on 18 May 2020 in Suva.

== Family ==
His father, Ram Jati Singh, was a member of the Legislative Council, elected on the National Federation Party (NFP) ticket. Lisa Singh, the Australian Labor Party Senator for Tasmania, is his niece.

Party political offices
Preceded by Dorsami Naidu	President of the National Federation Party; 2005–2014	Succeeded by Biman Prasad
