= Kallu Dhani Ram =

Kallu Dhani Ram (born 6 July 1923) is the General Secretary of the oldest farmers union in Fiji, the Fiji Kisan Sangh. He has been one of the few people who has been involved with the Sangh since being inspired to join it by its founder, Ayodhya Prasad, in 1939. He has made valuable contribution to the sugar industry in Fiji.

== Early life ==
Ram was born into a family of seven on 6 July 1923 at Vunisamaloa, in Ba. His parents Kallu of Belapratapgadh and Ragnathi of Jawanpur in India were among the last load of indentured labourers who arrived in 1916 abroad the Sutlej. Like other second generation Fiji Indians, his early life was spent working on the family farm with no prospect of any education. There were only a handful of schools in Ba in the 1930s and they taught only Tamil and English, so he started attending evening classes. He started attending the Koronubu Bhartiya Parshala in a neighbouring settlement in 1938. He spent only three years in school before returning to his family cane farm in 1941. On the advice of Pandit Ami Chandra he left his farm and took up employment in Ba town as a tailor. In 1949, he opened his own shop but in 1954 he sold his business and returned to his farm. In 1944, he married Shiv Dulari.

== Association with Fiji Kisan Sangh ==
Ram's desire and inspiration to fight for the rights of farmers began in 1939 when he first came in contact with the founder and first general secretary of Fiji Kisan Sangh, the late Pandit Ajodhya Prasad. It was during one of Pandit Prasad's pocket meetings that Ram attended as a 16-year-old where he was inspired to fight for the rights of farmers. Any one caught attending these meetings were given seven days notice by Colonial Sugar Refining Company (CSR) to vacate their farms and people were afraid to join the union. He has been the general secretary of the Fiji Kisan Sangh since 1979.

== Opponent of amnesty to coup plotters ==
Ram opposed the Reconciliation and Unity Commission, established in Fiji to grant amnesty to perpetrators of the Fiji coup of 2000, and compensation to victims of it from 19 May 2000 through 15 March 2001. He joined the Yellow Ribbon campaign opposing the legislation which he called an "abuse of power." He said that while the proposed Commission would be empowered to compensate coup victims for personal assault and loss of property, there was no provision to compensate people for the emotional trauma they had suffered. Moreover, he disagreed with the use of taxpayers' money to compensate victims of the coup. "It is most unfair to compensate the victims of wrongs done by the offender from taxpayers money because it amounts to compensating the victim from his own money," he said. The Kisan Sangh reiterated its opposition to the legislation on 7 July and again on 17 August, with Ram saying on both occasions that the bill would only aggravate tensions between the races, and would be a recipe for further coups in future. Even a wholly indigenous Fijian government would not be safe, he said.

In 2006, before the military coup, Ram supported plans by the Fiji military to clean up the Fiji government.

== Later life ==
Ram's wife, Shiv Dulari, died in 1996. As of November 2016, he was living in Drasa with his sons.
