= Sekove Naqiolevu =

Fijian lawyer and Solomon Islands judge

Sekove Naqiolevu is a Fijian jurist, diplomat, and civil servant, who has served as a judge in both Fiji and the Solomon Islands. He is currently a member of the Fiji Truth and Reconciliation Commission.

Naqiolevu was educated at the University of Papua New Guinea, where he studied law. He worked as a lawyer in the state solicitor's office before serving as Chief Magistrate of Fiji from 1992 to 1997. After working for the Prime Minister Office in Fiji, he was appointed Fiji's Ambassador to Papua New Guinea from 1999 to 2002. He subsequently served as a coordinator for the Regional Assistance Mission to Solomon Islands.

In 2005 he was appointed as a judge of the High Court and Appeal Court of the Solomon Islands.

On 30 January 2025 he was appointed to the Fiji Truth and Reconciliation Commission.
