= Reconciliation, Tolerance, and Unity Bill =

Proposed Fijian government body

The Reconciliation and Unity Commission was a proposed government body to be set up if the Reconciliation, Tolerance, and Unity Bill, which was introduced into the Fijian Parliament on 4 May 2005 was passed. The legislation proposed to empower the commission to grant amnesty to perpetrators of the Fiji coup of 2000, and compensation to victims of it from 19 May 2000 through 15 March 2001. The Fijian President would retain a veto over the granting of amnesty.

The commission was to be appointed by the President on the advice of the Prime Minister, in consultation with the Leader of the Opposition. Its purported objectives were to promote reconciliation in a spirit of tolerance and unity.

Attorney-General Qoriniasi Bale announced on 5 July that the bill was likely to be tabled in Parliament in September, but on 10 August, Manasa Tugia, the Chairman of Parliament's Justice, Law and Order Committee, announced that the date would be brought forward to mid-August.

On 17 August the House of Representatives voted to approve a request from Tugia to extend the time for the committee to hear submissions on the bill. Tugia said the extension was necessary because Hindi translations of the bill had not yet been legally vetted and distributed, and because the views of important stakeholders had not yet been received. Tugia said submissions received so far revealed diametrically opposed views on how to overcome Fiji's "coup culture." The differences appeared to be over means, not ends. "While both sides of the argument clearly want to see a better Fiji freed from the 'coup culture', the two sides have different views on how best this can be achieved," Tugia said.

On 18 August, Tugia said that the parliamentary committee needed more money to continue with public consultations on the bill, and said that an application had been lodged with the Ministry of Finance.

Commonwealth of Nations Secretary-General Don McKinnon revealed on 8 September 2005 that Prime Minister Qarase had assured him that significant changes would be made to the bill.

Section 5 of the Fijian translation of the bill states that in addition to the commission, a 22-member Reconciliation Council is to be set up. 20 members were to be chosen by the government, with one member to represent other races; an additional member would represent Fiji's churches. Its task would be to encourage people of all races to live harmoniously together, and to explore ways to promote forgiveness and unity.

Persons interfering with the commission would face a possible fine of five thousand dollars, or up to two years' imprisonment.

== Controversial legislation ==
The now-defunct 1990 Constitution imposed disabilities on the Indian population, who had until recently comprised over half the total population. This caused an exodus of the Indians.

A public opinion poll published in the Fiji Times on 21 June showed the bill had more opponents (44%) than supporters (35%). 13% had no opinion. There was a clear ethnic division: the bill was supported by 55% of indigenous Fijians but only 19% of Indo-Fijians, while 29% of indigenous Fijians and 60% of Indo-Fijians opposed it. 10% of indigenous Fijians and 14% of Indo-Fijians said they did not care one way or the other.

A Tebbutt Times poll published in the Fiji Times on 2 July revealed that only 4% of the population have read the bill fully, with a further 16% having read it partially.

== Warnings to media, foreigners ==
On 1 July, government spokesman Apisalome Tudreu angrily accused the media of bias. He blamed lack of objective reporting in the media for the negative public reception to the bill.

On 15 July, it was revealed that the government had issued a warning to foreign businessmen and investors not to meddle in Fiji's internal affairs. If they did not keep their political opinions to themselves, said the letter from Lesi Korovavala, chief executive officer of the Home Affairs Ministry, they would risk losing their work permits. The warning was sent to the Fiji Employers Federation, which has a powerful corporate membership.

== Rumoured Presidential opposition ==
The Fiji Times reported on 25 June that in a closed-door meeting with the Prime Minister, President Ratu Josefa Iloilo and Vice-President Ratu Joni Madraiwiwi had called on him to withdraw the legislation, with the vice-president, a former Judge, saying that there were serious legal implications to it. The Prime Minister reportedly replied that he would "consider" the request. To date, the Times report, written by Winikiti Bogidrau, the wife of an army officer, has not been verified, and spokesmen for the President and Prime Minister would not confirm or deny it, but on 27 June, the Fiji Labour Party (FLP) claimed on its website to have known of the meeting before the article was published. The FLP further alleged that the Prime Minister had intended to ask the President to use his position as Commander-in-chief of the Military to curb Commodore Bainimarama's public criticism of the bill, and that he was taken aback by the President's request to withdraw the legislation. Former Prime Minister Sitiveni Rabuka on 27 June that the President does not have the authority to force legislation to be withdrawn. In his traditional speech opening Parliament on 1 August, Iloilo said that the government had introduced it for the purpose of fostering unity and stability. He welcomed the public debate, saying that reconciliation was "a difficult but necessary process."

== Compromise mooted ==
On 4 October, Prime Minister Qarase said that significant amendments to the legislation were in the pipeline. Speaking on VitiFM radio and on Radio Sargam, which is affiliated to the Fiji Village news service, Qarase said that the bill would not be withdrawn, but that the amnesty clauses would be given a "makeover" to ensure that the Constitution was not violated and that the independence of law-enforcing agencies was not compromised. "There will be changes particularly in the Amnesty provision ... so that the Bill is constitutional and in accordance with the Bill of Rights," Qarase said. "Plus it does not interfere with the judiciary, police, and the Director of Public Prosecutions."

The Prime Minister's move to a more conciliatory position coincided with revelations from Manasa Tugia, a strong supporter of the legislation and the chairman of the parliamentary committee looking into it, that most public submissions received so far had raised concerns about the amnesty clauses in the bill. On 7 October, Tugia said after hearing submissions in five western towns that a large section of the community had expressed disappointment that they had not been consulted about the legislation. They, too, mostly supported the bill's objective of reconciliation, but opposed its amnesty provisions, he said.

Attorney-General Bale followed the Prime Minister's cue on 26 October, saying that any responsible government would listen to "sound logical reasoning" obtained from public consultations. He warned, however, that the government would not give in to Military opposition. It was the government, he said, that was the ultimate arbiter on the bill, and while the Military was entitled to its opinion, it was not the government. Bale's comments followed a statement by Military Commander Commodore Frank Bainimarama that whatever amendments the government might propose, the Military was still opposed to the legislation.

Tugia said on 10 November that the Justice Law and Order Committee had completed receiving public submissions on the bill, and were in the process of compiling a report. The presentation, due in two weeks, to parliament would take account of the views of all who made submissions, Tugia said. On 22 November, however, he announced another probable postponement of the tabling of the bill. He and Prime Minister Qarase said that the vast number of submissions might prevent the bill from being tabled for the December Parliamentary session, and that it might have to be postponed till February 2006.

Prime Minister Qarase announced on 1 December that the bill would be tabled in Parliament later that day, and that the Cabinet would prepare amendments that would be ready to be processed in Parliament's February 2006 sitting. The bill would not be withdrawn, he insisted on 16 December; to do so would be undemocratic, he considered. In his New Year message on 1 January 2006, he declared the bill to be the only way forward for Fiji. The legislation was vitally important for the harmonious and stable development of the country.

== Changes recommended by the parliamentary committee ==
Manasa Tugia, Chairman of Parliament's Justice, Law, and Order Committee, tabled the committee's report on the bill, on 1 December. He revealed that the parliamentary committee had received a total of 124 written and 148 oral submissions on the bill. The majority of organizations who presented submissions supported the legislation, he said, but the reverse was true of members of the public. He alleged that many people on both sides of the debate were supporting or opposing something they had not read. He expressed disappointment that few submissions had been received from the Indo-Fijian community. "We thought they would come forward to use this opportunity to air their views. But everyone was given a fair opportunity to air their views on the draft Bill," he said.

Tugia said that in attempting to reconcile the diametrically opposed views on the bill, the committee had studied similar legislation in countries like South Africa, Timor Leste, and the Solomon Islands, and had borrowed and synthesized elements from them in order to come up with a model for Fiji. A priority was that "necessary reconciliation" should take place between the perpetrators and the victims of the coup, he said. The bill's preamble, which emphasizes the rights of indigenous Fijians, should be deleted, the committee proposed.

The committee recommended retaining the most controversial part of the bill, the amnesty clauses, but proposed that they be reworded to clarify "that amnesty is to be granted in-line with the constitution and not the through the President as proposed by the Bill". It proposed replacing the word "offenders" with "wrongdoers" and felt that there should be no blanket amnesty, and that constitutional procedures should be followed scrupulously It called for the exclusion of murder, rape, and other sexual offences from amnesty under the bill. Grievous bodily harm and offences against public order should also be excluded, the committee said, but amnesty could be granted for non-violent crimes like unlawful assembly and illegal demonstrations, committed during the 2000 coup and its aftermath. Persons currently under investigation for coup-related offences could also apply for criminal immunity, on condition of their seeking forgiveness and reconciliation with their victims. In the event of their refusal to answer any question asked by the Reconciliation Commission, the case should be referred directly to the courts, the report proposed.

Prime Minister Qarase and Opposition Leader Chaudhry withheld comment pending a study of the proposed changes, but Fiji Law Society President Graeme Leung cautiously welcomed the committee's recommendations. The society had wanted the amnesty clauses deleted, he said, but the amendments went some way towards allaying their fears. "The recommendations make a very good effort at trying to ensure compliance with the Constitution," he said. He commended the committee for telling the government that if it wanted to pass the bill, it was very important to consult the public.

Attorney-General Bale said on 15 December that the government was considering the committee's recommendations, and would make a decision before the resumption of Parliament in February 2006. Prime Minister Qarase announced on 11 January 2006 that certain amendments, which he did not specify, had been decided on by the Cabinet, and would be brought before Parliament in the session beginning on 13 February.

== Police warnings ==
Police Commissioner Andrew Hughes spoke out on 16 September to express concern about the tone of the debate over the bill. He was reacting to comments made by Raiwaqa resident Masi Kaumaitotoya that although their leaders did not know it, the masses were preparing for another coup. Hughes said that such threats to stability would not be tolerated, and that "certain individuals" were being closely monitored.

Hughes reiterated on 19 September that persons making racist threats needed to be stopped, and called on chiefs and church leaders to counsel such individuals. "I can't understand how people who harbour these biases can reconcile their hatred of others with their religious beliefs," he added.

On 2 October, Manasa Tugia, the chairman of the parliamentary committee looking into other bill, said that he would not tolerate hate speeches from persons making parliamentary submissions on the bill, and that all comments would be limited to the bill itself.

== Parliamentary vote delayed ==
Prime Minister Qarase announced on 18 January that the tabling of the legislation for final parliamentary approval was being postponed until further notice, pending "consultations."

This move followed an extraordinary week which had seen unusual troop and naval deployments, rumours of a possible coup, and the dismissal of a senior Army officer for alleged insubordination, culminating in a meeting at Government House (the official residence of the President between the Prime Minister and the Military Commander, Commodore Frank Bainimarama (an implacable opponent of the bill), under the auspices of Vice-President Ratu Jone Madraiwiwi. In a statement issued after the meeting, Madraiwiwi said that the Prime Minister had agreed to consider the grievances of the Military and to consult them about possible changes to the legislation.

On the 18th, the Prime Minister went further and said that the process of consulting everybody could take a long time, and that it could no longer be guaranteed that the legislation would be passed in time for the 2006 parliamentary election. The same was true of other controversial bills opposed by the Military, including legislation defining indigenous fishing rights and establishing a separate indigenous court system, Qarase said.

Jioji Kotobalavu, the chief executive officer of the Prime Minister's Department, said that the bill was being revised, and that the Military would be briefed when the revision had been completed.

On 8 February 2006, it was announced that the bill had been shelved because of insufficient time to prepare the necessary amendments, but Prime Minister Qarase denied this. The bill had not been shelved, and would not be, he insisted, but it would not be voted upon by the present session of Parliament.

Opposition Leader Mahendra Chaudhry welcomed the postponement of the bill, but said that his wish was to see it "completely withdrawn," while Fijian Political Party General Secretary Ema Druavesi (another opponent of the bill) said that the whole process had been a waste of taxpayers' money.

The postponement was condemned by Ropate Sivo, a member of the executive of the Conservative Alliance (CAMV), the government's coalition partner, and by New Nationalist Party leader Saula Telawa. To shelve the bill was to "betray the trust of the common Fijian people," Sivo said. "All those heroes in jail from George Speight down have had their hopes of freedom dashed because of this," he protested. He called the setback a slap in the face for CAMV supporters in Vanua Levu and northern Tailevu, and warned the government to be careful, as repercussions would follow. Telawa, for his part, called on the Prime Minister to resign, saying that he had failed the Fijian people.

With the announcement that Parliament would be dissolved on 17 March 2006 pending a general election from 6–13 May, the bill is effectively shelved. Any reintroduction of the bill will depend on the outcome of the election. Military spokesman Lieutenant Colonel Orisi Rabukawaqa said on 3 March that the Military was still opposed to the bill, and warned any winner of the general election against reintroducing it.

Soqosoqo ni Vakavulewa ni Taukei Party (SVT) General Secretary Ema Druavesi and her National Federation Party counterpart, Pramod Rae, said that the time and money invested by the government in the bill had been a waste, with Rae adding that it had caused a great deal of division in Fijian society.

== Support for the bill ==
The bill had the strong support of Prime Minister Qarase, Attorney General Qoriniasi Bale, and other members of the ruling coalition. It was warmly welcomed by imprisoned coup instigator George Speight. The name "Blue Ribbon campaign" came from the blue ribbons promoted by the ruling United Fiji Party, which promoted the legislation. Other supporters included:

- The Methodist Church, to which some two-thirds of ethnic Fijians belong.
- Former Chief Justice Sir Timoci Tuivaga.
- Former Prime Minister Sitiveni Rabuka.
- Jaiwant Krishna of the Labasa Chamber of Commerce.
- Joe Vala Cakau, former publicity director of the Fijian Political Party.
- Ratu Amenatave Rabona Ravoka, a Bua chief.
- The Nationalist Vanua Tako Lavo Party, including General Secretary Iliesa Duvuloco and 2001 election candidates Soane Tobewaqiri and Soane Nakuna.
- Ratu Aca Soqosoqo, a Kadavu chief.
- Senator Adi Litia Cakobau.
- The Councils of all fourteen Provinces, as well as of the Dependency of Rotuma.
- The Vugalei Landowners Association (Chief Ratu Netava Tagi).
- Kelepi Lesi, vice-president of the Catholic League.
- Jale Baba, Director of the ruling United Fiji Party.
- Timoci Silatolu, former politician imprisoned for his involvement in the coup.
- Kitione Vuataki, lawyer.
- The Soqosoqo Vakamarama i Taukei women's organization (though apparently with some dissenters).
- The Great Council of Chiefs.
- Ambassador Kenro Ino of Japan.

== Opposition to the bill ==
Most politicians outside of the government came out against the proposed legislation, along with the Military and a number of business and professional organizations. The campaign came to be known as the "Yellow Ribbon Campaign", from the yellow ribbons that many opponents of the bill wore around their wrists in public.

=== Politicians and chiefs ===
- Mahendra Chaudhry, Opposition Leader and former Prime Minister.
- Mick Beddoes, leader of the United Peoples Party.
- Ratu Epeli Ganilau, founder of the National Alliance Party former Chairman of the Great Council of Chiefs.
- Adi Ateca Ganilau, wife of Ratu Epeli Ganilau and daughter of former President Ratu Sir Kamisese Mara.
- Senator Adi Koila Nailatikau, younger sister of Adi Ateca Ganilau.
- Dorsami Naidu, former President of the National Federation Party (NFP).
- Ema Druavesi, Secretary of the Fijian Political Party.
- Krishna Datt, a Labour Party parliamentarian and former Cabinet Minister.
- Meli Waqa, Secretary of the National Alliance Party.
- Filipe Bole, former Foreign Minister.
- Ratu Aisea Katonivere, the Paramount Chief of Macuata Province.
- Senator James Ah Koy.
- Senivalati Naitala of the Ra Fiji Cane Growers Council.
- Adi Ema Tagicakibau, a Minister in the deposed People's Coalition government.

=== Religious organizations ===
- The Shree Sanatan Dharm Pratindhi Sabha Fiji (a Hindu organization; President Surendra Kumar).
- The Arya Pratinidhi Sabha, (another Hindu organization; President Kamlesh Arya).
- Archbishop Petero Mataca of the Roman Catholic Church
- The Salvation Army (Regional Commander Major Gordon Daly).
- The Jesus Christ Apostolic Church (General Secretary Esala Tuibua).
- Paula Baba, a Lay Columban missionary.
- Rev. Josateki Koroi, the former President of the Methodist Church of Fiji and Rotuma.
- The Council of Interfaith Search Fiji (spokeswoman Tessa MacKenzie).
- Moti Chand Maharaj, a Hindu priest.
- Jehovah's Witnesses spokesman Taito Tabaleka.

=== Other organizations and individuals ===
- The Fiji Law Society (President Graeme Leung).
- The Citizens Constitutional Forum (Director Rev. Akuila Yabaki).
- Shamima Ali and Edwina Kotoisuva of the Fiji Women's Crisis Centre.
- Dr Shaista Shameem of the Fiji Human Rights Commission.
- Police Commissioner Andrew Hughes.
- The Fiji Institute of Accountants.
- Ravesi Johnson of the women's organization Soqosoqo Vakamarama i Taukei.
- Kallu Dhani Ram, General Secretary of the Kisan Sangh cane-growers' association.
- Economist Wadan Narsey.
- Gregory Allen, the former assistant director of Public Prosecutions.
- William Parkinson of Communications Fiji Limited, a broadcasting company, said on 15 June that the government had left it too late to consult the public about the legislation. If reconciliation was the purpose of the bill, he said, the public should have a sense of ownership over it. The amnesty provisions would tear the nation apart, he said, rather than foster reconciliation.
- Samisoni Kakaivalu, editor of the Fiji Times.
- Suliana Siwatibau of Concerned Mothers Group Against the Bill.
- Dr Biman Prasad, Associate Professor of Economics at the University of the South Pacific.
- The Fiji Women's Lawyers Association (President Ulamila Fa-Tuituku).
- The Concerned Citizens against the Unity Bill, a coalition of groups opposed to the legislation. Prominent members include Senator Felix Anthony and Mrs Bernadette Ganilau, sister-in-law of the National Alliance Party founder.
- Sharon Baghwan-Rolls of the National Council of Women.
- Selina Kuruleca, a psychotherapist.
- Maciu Navakasuasua, coup-convict turned informant.
- The Military (Commander Commodore Frank Bainimarama).

=== Foreign governments and organizations ===
- New Zealand's then Foreign Minister, Phil Goff.
- Susan Boyd, Australia's former High Commissioner to Fiji.
- The Law Association for Asia and the Pacific (LAWASIA).
- John North of the Australian Law Council.
- Former Prime Minister Sir Geoffrey Palmer of New Zealand.
- The International Confederation of Free Trade Unions.
- Glenn Martin of the Bar Association of Queensland.
- The International Federation of Chemical, Energy, Mine and General Workers Union (ICEM).

== Calls for moderation ==
In the midst of the strident public statements both for and against the proposed legislation, a number of voices have taken more nuanced positions, or have called for moderation and mutual understanding.

- Meli Bogileka, General secretary of the People's National Party.
- Alexander Downer, Australian Foreign Minister.
- Eliki Lalauvaki of the Fiji Brethren Assemblies Partnership.
- Militoni Leweniqila, an executive member of the Soqosoqo ni Vakavulewa ni Taukei Party (SVT)
- Santal Maharaj of the New Zealand-based Fiji Human Rights Groups (NZ).
- Don McKinnon, Secretary-General of the Commonwealth of Nations.
- Ratu Sairusi Nagagavoka, Paramount Chief of Ba District in Ba Province.
- Ratu Seru Seruvakula, Chairman of the Nasautoka sub-district of the Wainibuka district of Tailevu Province.
- Jack Simpson, director of Prison Fellowship Fiji.
- Ame Tugaue, General Secretary of the Methodist Church.
- The Assemblies of God.
- Taito Waradi, president of the Fijian Chamber of Commerce and Industry.
- An anonymous chief from Ba Province.
- Ratu Josaia Duacia, Paramount Chief of Sikituru in Ba Province.

== 2006 military coup ==
On 13 May 2005, Bainimarama spoke out against the proposal, calling it "Reconciliation bull" and vowing that he and the military would oppose the legislation, which detractors say is a sham to grant amnesty to supporters of the present government who played roles in the coup. His attack on the legislation, which continued unremittingly throughout May and into June, further strained his already tense relationship with the government.

On 5 June, Bainimarama reiterated his opposition to the proposed reconciliation commission, and said that if the government continued to "bulldoze" it through Parliament, he would be forced to "open up." He did not elaborate on what he meant by that.

On 11 July, Bainimarama issued one of his strongest-worded challenges yet to the government, saying that it was forcing the country into the same anarchy as in 2000. The Reconciliation and Unity Bill would never allow the country to live in peace, he said. In an eight-page statement, he warned that the Military was would take decisive action against any "destabilisers" - among whom he named Attorney-General Bale and Ministry of Reconciliation Chief Executive Apisalome Tudreu. "The military will dish out the same fate we dealt George Speight and his group to anyone whom we think deserves this treatment," Bainimarama said. He said that he would arrest and put on trial anyone who threatened the stability of Fiji.

In late November 2006, Bainimarama handed down a list of demands to Qarase, one of which was the withdrawal of three controversial bills, including the Reconciliation, Tolerance, and Unity Bill.

On 5 December, Bainimarama overthrew the government. Addressing the media to explain his actions, he stated that the Reconciliation Bill had to be prevented as it would have "undermined the Constitution". He later added that, if the SDL party returned to power, he would tolerate it only as long as it did not attempt to re-introduce the Bill. "If you do it, I'll remove you," he warned.

== Disinterested positions ==
A few Fijian citizens considered the debate over the controversial legislation to be an irrelevance, or otherwise refused to comment on it.

- Business tycoon Hari Punja said on 15 July that the bill was the least of his worries. Of far greater concern to him was the government's failure to resolve a trade dispute with the government of Vanuatu, which has negatively affected Punja's own business interests.
- Former Opposition Leader Jai Ram Reddy, now a judge serving on the International Criminal Tribunal for Rwanda, refused to answer questions about the bill that were put to him on 23 August 2005, saying that he considered it improper for him, as a judge, to comment on political issues. "I am a judge and I am away from politics," he said.

== See also ==
- Fiji Truth and Reconciliation Commission
- Military opposition to the bill
- Military–church relations in Fiji
- International reaction to the Reconciliation, Tolerance, and Unity Bill
