= Marcus Brand =

Austrian constitutional and international lawyer

- Born: March 24, 1971 (age 55); Vienna, Austria
- Occupation: Constitutional and international lawyer
- Spouse: Annette Lyth

Marcus George Brand (born March 24, 1971) is an Austrian constitutional and international lawyer and democratic-governance expert known for work with the UN, OSCE and International IDEA, particularly in Kosovo, Nepal, Myanmar, Ukraine and Fiji. He was the first chair of the Fiji Truth and Reconciliation Commission in 2025. He is acting as Global Democracy Goodwill Ambassador for the Korea Democracy Foundation.

== Education ==
Brand has a degree in international and constitutional law from the University of Vienna, a master's degree in human rights law from the European University Institute, and a diploma in international relations from the Johns Hopkins University's School of Advanced International Studies (SAIS Europe) in Bologna. His doctoral work concerned constitutionalism and human-rights protection in UN-administered Kosovo.

== Career ==
Brand worked with the OSCE in Kosovo from 1999 to 2000, including as the OSCE's first representative in the Secretariat of Kosovo's Interim Administrative Council, and subsequently worked as a Kosovo analyst for the European Stability Initiative. His 2003 study The Development of Kosovo Institutions and the Transition of Authority from UNMIK to Local Self-Government has been cited by numerous sources.

From 2008 to 2011 he worked in Nepal as a senior constitutional adviser/policy specialist with UNDP's constitution-building programme after the civil war, working particularly on federalisation, state restructuring and the transition to the new constitutional order.

From 2015 to 2020, Brand worked in Ukraine as UNDP Senior Advisor on Democratic Reform and Sustainable Development in Ukraine.

From September 2020 to 2024, Brand led the International Institute for Democracy and Electoral Assistance to develop International IDEA's country programme in Myanmar. He ran it through the November 2020 election and the 2021 Myanmar coup d'état, after which its work focused on democratic institutions, federal constitutionalism and the opposition's attempts to construct a post-junta constitutional system.

== Fiji Truth and Reconciliation Commission ==
In 2024, with support of the EU, Brand was appointed head of the newly established Fiji Truth and Reconciliation Commission. This was a controversial decision, with the NGO Coalition on Human Rights (NGOCHR) raising concerns over a lack of transparency over the appointment process. The Coalition criticised the appointment of "an expatriate with little to no lived experience in Fiji", when there were qualified locals who could have taken up the position.

Under Brand's leadership, the commission's focus was on survivors and healing rather than criminal prosecution.

In 2025, he resigned from his position as chairman for personal reasons. Of this, University of the South Pacific academic Dr Shailendra Singh said "Dr Brand leaves Fiji “having made a strong impact” during his tenure, saying that his leadership has “laid a solid foundation for the work ahead”.

== Personal life ==
Brand was married to fellow international lawyer Annette Lyth, with whom he has two daughters.
