= Taito Waradi =

Fijian businessman

Taito Waradi is a Fijian businessman who has served as President of the Fiji Chamber of Commerce and Industry. He is known as a strong proponent of free enterprise. He has been outspoken in his calls for moral values to be upheld in business, politics, and society. On 8 January 2007 he resigned the presidency of the Chamber of Commerce and Industry to take up the position of Minister for Commerce in the interim cabinet of Commodore Frank Bainimarama.

== Business positions ==
On 22 May 2005, Waradi called for the deregulation of the telecommunication market, to allow the market to dictate prices.

== Political positions ==
On 18 May 2005, Waradi spoke out about the Fijian government's controversial proposal to establish a Reconciliation and Unity Commission, with the power to recommend amnesty for perpetrators of the coup d'état that rocked Fiji in 2000, as well as compensation for its victims. Among the strident comments both for and against the proposal, Waradi took a moderate stance, supporting the principle of reconciliation, but considering that legislating to establish the commission was not the right way to achieve it. He called the proposed legislation a "man-made law" that would not work unless the economic disparity between the races (indigenous Fijians and Indo-Fijians) was rectified. He also said that moral values would be essential to the success of the reconciliation process.

Only by integrating indigenous Fijians into the economic life of the country, such as through joint ventures, equities, board memberships, employment, and investment, could the root cause of unrest and instability be addressed, he said. Economic reconciliation would have to come before social and political reconciliation.

Rather than proceed with the proposed legislation, Waradi said the government should declare a National Conscience Week as a time for individuals and society as a whole to examine their hearts to ascertain where the nation had gone wrong. This week of reflection should be followed, he said, by a roadmap to achieve true reconciliation, peace, and prosperity.

Waradi also emphasized that without moral values, the reconciliation process would fail. "No amount of legislation can guarantee lasting peace and stability if the people it is supposed to serve are not spiritually and emotionally prepared to live by them and where necessary defend them with their lives when it is breached," he said. "Basic moral values must therefore first be internalised in the hearts and minds of its people before we can hope to enforce legislation reflecting these values. We cannot begin to observe man-made laws if we do not have any moral values to start off with in the first place." This followed his earlier call on 15 May for social institutions that mould young people, such as churches, to preach and follow moral values.

He supported the 2006 Fijian coup d'état, saying that the clock could not be turned back.
