= Orisi Rabukawaqa =

Fijian career soldier

Orisi Rabukawaqa is a Fijian career soldier. By early 2006, he held the rank of lieutenant colonel and was one of two official spokesmen for the Military, the other being Major Neumi Leweni.

In his role as spokesman, Rabukawaqa articulated a number of criticisms of government policies, including the promotion of the controversial Reconciliation, Tolerance, and Unity Bill, which sought to empower a Commission to compensate victims and pardon perpetrators of the Fiji coup of 2000.
