= Sharon Bhagwan-Rolls =

Fijian activist

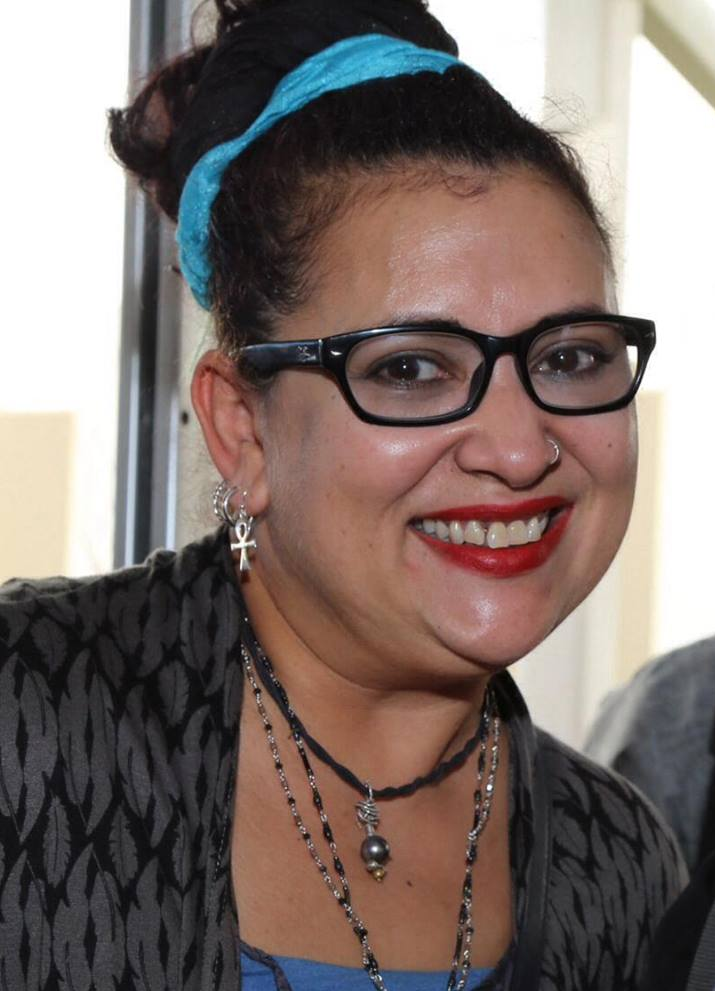
Rolls at the US embassy Independence day celebrations 2014

Sharon Bhagwan-Rolls is a Fijian political activist of Indian descent known for political activism within the intersections of feminism, media, climate change and peace.

She is the Technical Adviser of Shifting the Power Coalition, a humanitarian organization headed by Pacific women. She is also the former coordinator of the FemLINKPACIFIC, a women's media organization based in the capital of Suva, which she founded in September 2000 in response to the 2000 Fijian coup d'état. In addition to her numerous other functions, Rolls has served as the Media Focal Point for the Pacific Region of the Global Partnership for the Prevention of Armed Conflict was appointed the Gender Liaison of the International Steering Group of GPPAC in October 2009.

Since November 2000, femLINKPACIFIC and Bhagwan Rolls have been campaigning for the implementation and integration of UN Security Council resolution 1325, titled Women, Peace and Security, in order to ensure women's full participation in the peace and security sector toward ensuring sustainable peace and democracy in Fiji. In March 2010, she was appointed by the United Nations to the Civil Society Advisory Group on UNSCR1325/Women, Peace and Security. She presented a Pacific perspective to High level Commitment to Action on SCR 1325 event at the UN on September 25, 2010.

Bhagwan Rolls and femLINKPACIFIC have also introduced a mobile women's community radio station (femTALK 89.2fm) in Fiji in 2004, as way to take radio to women in local communities, providing a relevant information and communication platform to increase women's visibility and issues in decision making forums. Earlier, together with co-founder, Peter Sipeli, Bhagwan-Rolls produced a number of community videos. The video "Balancing the Scale" won the Fiji Human Rights Commission television award. She continues to serve as the Producer/Director of FemLINKPACIFIC's Community video productions including The Thirteen 25 Diary: Her'stories (2010) which was launched in New York (October 2010) in conjunction with the Australia and Papua New Guinea missions to the United Nations, as part of the 10th anniversary of UNSCR1325

Rolls was known as a strong critic of the military coup which deposed the Qarase government on 5 December 2006, and of human rights violations allegedly committed by soldiers since then.

She also called on her fellow Indo-Fijians to "follow the footsteps of Mahatma Gandhi" and oppose the coup, saying that Gandhi preached friendship, forgiveness, love, tolerance, and non-violence. “Nothing has been achieved through violence and weapons and I believe that we just lose lives of our loved ones under gun point,” she told the Fiji Sun on 10 December 2006.

Rolls was the principal organizer of the "Blue Ribbon" campaign to restore democracy following 2000 Fijian coup d'état, in May 2000. Later, she opposed the Reconciliation, Tolerance, and Unity Bill introduced by the Qarase government in 2005 to provide for amnesty for persons convicted of coup-related offences.

Rolls resigned as director of FemLINKpacific in December 2018.

== Publications ==
She has been featured on many articles that related to women's rights, environmental and overall peace activism mainly focusing on the Pacific Island region.

- Bhagwan-Rolls, Sharon (2006). "Women as Mediators in Pacific Conflict Zones." Exploration of women's engagement in the pacific Islands peace building movement.
- Bhagwan-Rolls, Sharon (2007). "Women’s media: Challenging the status quo." Exploration in mainstream media's opinion of women in pacific society
- Bhagwan-Rolls, Sharon (2011). "Pacific regional perspectives on women and the media: Making the connection with UN security council resolution 1325 (women, peace and security) and section J if the Beijing platform for action." Discusses the challenges and implication of empowering women in rural pacific Island communities, focusing on addressing social norms, power dynamics, access to basic necessities and information, and coordinating efforts within a diverse media landscape to advantage gender equality and women's rights.
- Bhagwan-Rolls, Sharon (2014). "Thinking globally and acting locally: linking women, peace and security in the Pacific." Highlights the marginalization of women in formal decision-making structures in the Pacific Island region due to patriarchal governance, while also emphasizing their pivotal role in peace building efforts.
- Bhagwan-Rolls, Sharon, and Sian Rolls (2019) "WPS and the Pacific Islands forum." 402-412.
- Bhagwan-Rolls, Sharon (2020) "Feminist Peace and Security in the Pacific Islands." With Alisia Evens, they use a feminist analysis of Pacific regional Women, Peace and Security (WPS) mechanisms to highlight Pacific feminist peace builders’ efforts to localize regional peace and security policies through gender-transformative peace building practices.
