= Unaisi Vuniwaqa =

Fijian police officer and UN peacekeeper

- Born: Totoya, Fiji
- Education: University of the South Pacific (MBA)
- Police career
- Department: Fiji police force; United Nations Mission in South Sudan

Unaisi Vuniwaqa, from Fiji, is the United Nations Assistant Secretary-General for Safety and Security. She was previously the Commissioner of Police for the United Nations Mission in South Sudan (UNMISS). Prior to going to South Sudan in 2016, she was Acting Assistant Commissioner of Police in Fiji and had been the first head of the Sexual and Gender-based Violence Unit of the Fiji Police Force.

== Early life ==
Unaisi Vuniwaqa comes from a small village on Totoya, a volcanic island in Fiji's Lau archipelago. She studied at the Lelean Memorial School in Nausori on Fiji's main island of Viti Levu, completing her secondary school education at Laucala Bay Secondary School, near Fiji's capital, Suva.

== Career ==
After completing her studies, Vuniwaqa considered being a teacher or a nurse but chose to become a police officer as that required only six months of training, whereas nursing and teaching required two years. In a class of 100 cadets, she won the Baton of Honour for best all-round performer. She joined the Fiji Police Force in 1986. In 1995, she was appointed head of a newly created Sexual and Gender-based Violence Unit. She was later director of human resources and director of strategic planning. When she joined the force the percentage of women police officers was about 5%. Now it is over 20%.

After obtaining a master's in business administration and management from the University of the South Pacific (USP) in Suva in 2015, Vuniwaqa was selected to head the Fiji Police Force's contingent to the United Nations peacekeeping mission to South Sudan (UNMISS). In 2017, she was appointed as deputy police commissioner of UNMISS. A year later, she was promoted to police commissioner, the first woman to hold the post. In this role she had police officers from 46 countries under her command.

She stepped down from that position in October 2021, and in November, she was appointed United Nations Assistant Secretary-General for Safety and Security by Secretary-General of the United Nations António Guterres.

== Personal life ==
Vuniwaqa is married with four children.

== Awards and honours ==
- Vuniwaqa was named as one of the "10 Outstanding Fijians in 2020" by the Fiji Sun newspaper.
