= Selina Kuruleca =

Fijian psychotherapist and commentator

Selina Kuruleca is a Fijian psychotherapist and commentator. She has been regularly quoted by media outlets in Fiji on a wide variety of issues, such as the controversial Reconciliation, Tolerance, and Unity Bill promoted by the government of Prime Minister Laisenia Qarase (2000–2006). She expressed serious misgivings about the bill, especially with respect to its provisions for amnesty to be granted to persons convicted of offences related to the Fiji coup of 2000.

Kuruleca has been the President of the Fiji Association of Social Workers, and was a lecturer at the University of the South Pacific.
