= Akuila Yabaki =

Fijian human rights activist and Methodist clergyman

Akuila Yabaki is a Fijian human rights activist and Methodist clergyman. He served as the executive director of the Citizens Constitutional Forum (CCF), a pro-democracy organisation, from 2002 to 2015.

== Religious career ==
Yabaki was dismissed from the pulpit by the Methodist Church of Fiji and Rotuma in 2001. No official reason was publicly given, although reports suggested that political disagreements may have been a factor. He continued to use the title Reverend.

== Activism and public role ==
Yabaki was a prominent critic of policies of the government of Laisenia Qarase (2000–2006). He opposed the early release of individuals convicted in connection with the 2000 Fijian coup d'état and also opposed the Reconciliation, Tolerance, and Unity Bill, which proposed an amnesty for those involved.

In the lead-up to the 2006 Fijian coup d'état, Yabaki called for dialogue and mediation between the military and the government.

Following the coup, he warned the military-backed administration that it could face legal challenges over alleged human rights violations.

== Legal issues ==
In May 2013, Yabaki was convicted of scandalising the court after publishing an article in a CCF newsletter that questioned the independence of Fiji's judiciary under military rule. He was fined and received a suspended prison sentence.
