= International reaction to the Reconciliation, Tolerance, and Unity Bill =

Reactions to controversial bill by Fijian government

The controversial Reconciliation, Tolerance, and Unity Bill promoted by the Fijian government throughout 2005 generated enormous debate, both locally and internationally. The legislation aimed to establish a Commission empowered to compensate victims and pardon perpetrators of the coup d'état that deposed the elected government of Prime Minister Mahendra Chaudhry in May 2000. Support for the legislation came from Japan, while New Zealand opposed it. Australia, too, expressed strong reservations about the legislation, but also called on opponents of it, including the Military of Fiji, to show greater moderation. Non-governmental organizations in a number of countries took positions, also.

== Australia ==
=== Susan Boyd ===
On 15 June 2005, Susan Boyd, Australia's former High Commissioner to Fiji, accused the Qarase government of promoting the controversial Reconciliation and Unity Bill for purely political purposes. The bill proposes the establishment of a Commission with the power (subject to presidential approval) to compensate victims and pardon perpetrators of the 2000 coup. Most of those imprisoned for offenses related to the 2000 coup, she told ABC Asia Pacific Focus, were members of the Conservative Alliance, whose six seats in the House of Representatives were crucial to maintaining the government's parliamentary majority.

She said that the attempt to legislate reconciliation was overly simplistic. "People have to make up for their misdeeds, apologies have to be accepted by those who are harmed, and the onus is really on those who have sinned, rather than the onus on those who have been sinned against," Boyd said.

She paid tribute to Commodore Voreqe (Frank) Bainimarama, the commander of the Fijian Military. "It was the military that really brought Fiji back onto the right track," she said. She expressed concern, however, that the "tremendously widespread campaign against the bill," which Bainimarama and the military strongly oppose, could lead to another coup, as she saw an ongoing power struggle between the government and the military. "The military commander Commodore Voreqe Bainimarama has always expressed himself that if government goes off the rails it is his job to restore the situation," Boyd said.

Boyd's remarks provoked an angry reaction from Prime Minister Qarase, as well as from Conservative Alliance Secretary Ropate Sivo. Qarase said on June 20 that the majority of the Fijian population, especially Christians, supported the bill. He said that Boyd's comments as a visitor were untrue and "irresponsible." Sivo, for his part, considered Boyd to be an inappropriate person to be commenting on the situation. He accused her and others in her position of having "abandoned the sinking ship" during the coup crisis. He also disputed her claim that Commodore Bainimarama had ended the crisis, saying that that was achieved through a traditional Fijian ceremony in Parliament.

=== Alexander Downer ===
On a visit to Fiji from 28 to 30 September 2005, Australian Foreign Minister Alexander Downer cautioned both promoters and opponents of the legislation. He said that Australia was concerned about certain aspects of the bill, especially its amnesty provisions. "We feel amnesties that are poorly handled and prematurely handled would be very provocative," Downer said. The Fijian government had assured him, he said, that amendments were in the pipeline, and said he was hopeful that the matter would be removed sensibly. "I'm optimistic now, without being 100 percent certain, that they're going to handle this in a sensible way," Downer told Australia's Radio National.

At the same time, he called on one of the bill's most unyielding opponents, Military Commander Commodore Frank Bainimarama to back off. "It's not the job of a military commander to play politics, his job is to command his troops," Downer said. He also said that the future of Fiji should be decided by all the people, not just a small number of individuals. Downer said he was "optimistic", though not completely sure, that the Fijian government would handle the matter "sensibly."

On 29 September, Bainimarama reacted strongly to Downer's criticism of the Military's involvement in politics. Bainimarama said that the Military was disappointed by Downer's remarks, insisting that his criticism of the bill was security-related.

The Commander reiterated his disappointment with Downer's position on 30 September, saying that Australians have never experienced a coup and do not know what it is like to live through one. "I told him (Downer) his country has not experienced a coup to feel what the military went through here. He can't compare the situation there to this side," Bainimarama said. He insisted that the Military's opposition to the Unity Bill was not political, but security-related, and accused the ruling Soqosoqo Duavata ni Lewenivanua of turning it into a political issue. "We were never involved in politics," he said. "It was the political party that pushed their agenda, the Bill, forward and we only reacted to the consequences the Bill would bring." Making these comments at a press conference at Suva's Queen Elizabeth Barracks, Bainimarama ordered the Daily Post newspaper to leave because they supported the bill and were therefore, he said, against the Military.

Support for the Commander, meanwhile, came from Senator James Ah Koy, who commended him for opposing the Unity Bill and for standing up to the Australian Foreign Minister. "I really support him for his strong words against Mr Downer," he said on 1 October. "He is a strong man and we are blessed to have him in office. His priority is national security and that is why he is coming out strong on the Bill."

== New Zealand ==
New Zealand's Foreign Minister, Phil Goff, spoke out on 10 June, expressing concern about the legislation. Goff said that it was important not to give the impression that it was legitimate to use unconstitutional means to overthrow an elected government, any time or anywhere.

== Japan ==
Kenro Ino, Japan's outgoing Ambassador to Fiji, applauded the legislation on 25 August. Interviewed by the Fiji Village news service, Ino said that stability in Fiji would result from uniting the races, and spoke positively about the government's efforts to promote reconciliation through the controversial bill.

== Commonwealth of Nations ==
Don McKinnon, Secretary-General of the Commonwealth of Nations (of which Fiji is a member) called on the Fijian government to ensure that the legislation reflected the views of its citizens. He took pains to emphasize, however, that the Commonwealth had no position of its own with respect to the controversial bill.

== International legal bodies ==
An international law body, the Law Association for Asia and the Pacific (LAWASIA) came out against the bill on 19 May, saying that it interfered with the process of law. "It does nothing to indicate to the victims of their actions that the legal system has delivered justice, and is tantamount to interfering with judicial process," considered Girdhari Lal Sanghi, president of LAWASIA. "While efforts to establish unity and reconciliation in Fiji are essential and worthy of support, the process must not be allowed to happen at the expense of the rule of law," Sanghi said.

John North of the Law Council of Australia predicted on 22 June that Fiji would become a dangerous place for tourists if the legislation were to become law. The council was concerned, he said, that a government-appointed body could overturn judicial decisions. The mixing of the powers of the executive and judicial branches of government was antithetical to democracy, he considered. He expressed hope that the Australian government would take a stand against what he considered to be a threat to democracy. He conceded that there were some good things in the bill, but insisted that "any decision to be able to grant people pardons or to overturn properly constituted sentences should not be left to a government-appointed body."

Former Prime Minister Sir Geoffrey Palmer of New Zealand also condemned the bill on 22 June, calling it "unconstitutional and a recipe for division and constitutional disaster." Palmer, now a lawyer with the Chen Palmer and Partners law firm in Wellington, New Zealand, was addressing the Fiji Law Society, which had sought his advice on the bill. He said that this legislation would enable any criminal behaviour to be labelled as "political", and would render the law of treason "inoperative" for the period designated for the Commission to function. The bill, he said, undermined the constitutional status of the Prerogative of Mercy Commission, and was therefore "inconsistent with the constitution."

On 2 July Palmer again attacked the legislation. "It appears to me to be a recipe for division and constitutional disaster. I can see no way in which this proposed legislation as currently fashioned can advance the interests of Fiji," he said. He reiterated that the bill was unconstitutional, and called it an affront to human rights, the rule of law, and judicial independence. He also expressed concern about the wording of the bill. The power to grant compensation to victims and amnesty to perpetrators of the coup is supposed to be subject to presidential approval, but Palmer considered that to be a legal fiction. The wording of the bill, he said, made it clear that the Commission's recommendations would be binding on the President. The Fiji Times quoted a prominent Suva lawyer, whom they did not name, as supporting Palmer's interpretation. "Legally, the Government can go ahead with the Bill without the President's permission or even informing him. And the Bill, as it is, does not give any authority to the President to have a say," the lawyer was quoted as saying.

Glenn Martin of the Bar Association of Queensland said on 27 June that if the legislation became law, local and international confidence in Fiji would be eroded. He also expressed concern at what he saw as an undermining of the independence of the Fijian judiciary. "Unfortunately, there is a real risk that a Bill in this form, which appears designed to interfere with proper judicial processes and outcomes, will erode local and international confidence in Fiji's institutions of State," he said. Another cause for concern, he said, was the expulsion of Peter Ridgeway, an Australian citizen, who as Fiji's Deputy Director of Public Prosecutions had spearheaded the prosecution of persons implicated into the coup.

The London-based International Bar Association (IBA) called for changes to the bill to be made on 9 February 2006. Joanna Salsbury, a lawyer with the Association's Human Rights Institute, said that the amnesty provisions were overemphasized and that there was too little recognition of the victims. "If you have an amnesty process that isn't really linked to proper restitution for victims, then ultimately you have no form of reconciliation," she said. The organization had a total membership of more than twenty thousand lawyers and over 195 national Bar Associations and Law Societies.

== Trade unions ==
The International Confederation of Free Trade Unions called for the bill to be withdrawn on 26 June. In a letter to Prime Minister Qarase, union secretary Guy Ryde questioned the government's motives bringing the legislation. "The Bill does not promote reconciliation but rather promotes the illegal overthrow of elected governments for political expediency," the letter said. "It is obvious that Fiji is trying to legalise acts of treason and terrorism while the whole world is attempting to eradicate it."

The International Federation of Chemical, Energy, Mine and General Workers Union (ICEM), which represents more than 20 million workers worldwide, announced on 21 July that it had written to Prime Minister Qarase on 4 July to express its concerns at the bill. General Secretary Fred Higgs said that the bill would set a dangerous precedent and threaten the rule of law, human rights, and democracy. "The international trade union movement has taken a keen interest in human and trade union rights matters in Fiji for many decades now. These are the core values the international trade union movement and the international community is upholding while your Government undermines it," he wrote.

Meeting in Papua New Guinea under the chairmanship of Fiji Labour Party Senator Felix Anthony on 26 July, the executive of South Pacific Oceania Council of Trade Unions called on the government to withdraw the bill, which, it said, was against the Constitution and the 1999 Human Rights Act, usurped the role and power of the judiciary and of the Director of Public Prosecutions, and discriminated against the victims of the coup in favour of its perpetrators.

== See also ==
- Fiji Truth and Reconciliation Commission
- Qualified positions on the bill
- Military opposition to the bill
- International reaction to the bill
