= Neumi Leweni =

Fijian Army officer and diplomat

Neumi Leweni is a Fijian former soldier, diplomat, and civil servant, who served as spokesperson for the Republic of Fiji Military Forces and the military regime during the 2006 Fijian coup d'état.

== Career ==
In 2006 Leweni was one of two official spokesmen for the Military, the other being Lieutenant Colonel Orisi Rabukawaqa. Like other senior Military officers, Leweni was particularly outspoken in his opposition to certain policies and decisions of the Qarase government, including the early release from prison of persons convicted of offences relating to the 2000 Fijian coup d'état. He also took a vocal stand against the government's Reconciliation, Tolerance, and Unity Bill, which proposed to establish a Commission to compensate victims and pardon perpetrators of the coup. This, said Leweni, would undermine the rule of law and the integrity of the Military, as the Army could then be required to readmit soldiers convicted of mutiny.

In August 2007, he resigned to take up a diplomatic post, as Military attaché to China but has since rejoined the Military and returned from his diplomatic posting to serve with the RFMF.

In January 2010 Fiji's military regime attempted to appoint him as high commissioner to New Zealand, but the appointment was rejected by the New Zealand government.

In 2016, he was appointed Chief Protocol Officer of the Ministry of Foreign Affairs. He was suspended in May 2018 pending investigation into an alleged visa scam.

In 2019 Leweni acted as a consultant for controversial property development company Freesoul.
