= Pramod Rae =

Fijian trade unionist and political organizer

Pramod Kumar Rae (born 27 October 1951) is a Fijian trade unionist and political organizer of Indian descent. He was born in Suva and completed a Bachelor of Arts degree and Post Graduate Certificate in Education from the University of the South Pacific.

He has served for many years as General Secretary of the National Federation Party (NFP), and worked to revive the popularity of the party, once a major player on the political scene but left without parliamentary representation in the general elections of 1999, 2001, and 2006.

Rae was an unsuccessful candidate for the Suva City Open Constituency in the 1999 election. He received only 89 votes out of more than 12,000. He made another attempt to win election to the House of Representatives in the 2001 election, this time from the Laucala Open Constituency. He polled 6.1 percent of the vote, a considerable improvement on the negligible showing that Jag Nadan had made in the 1999 election. He was also a candidate in the 2006 election. He polled 666 votes, some 5 percent of the total, in the Samabula Tamavua Open Constituency. Most of his opponents in 2006 were nationally known politicians.

Rae strongly opposed the military coup that deposed the elected government of Laisenia Qarase on 5 December 2006. In the general elections held in 2014, the first since the coup, Rae stood as a candidate for the NFP, but was not elected.

== Trade unionist ==
Rae has also been General Secretary of the Bank and Financial Sector Employees Union since March 2004, when he defeated Fiji Labour Party Parliamentarian Ganesh Chand by 1145 votes to 484, with 17 ballots invalidated, in the trade union leadership elections. Alleging irregularities and corruption, Chand claimed that the election had been "thoroughly rigged" and sought an injunction in the High Court to nullify the election. The court upheld Chand's complaint and referred the matter to Taito Waqa, the chief executive officer of the Ministry of Labour, who is also the registrar of trade unions, for a final decision. Waqa ruled in favour of Chand on 10 February 2006. Chand said that Rae must vacate the union offices immediately and surrender any union assets in his custody, the Fiji Times reported.

Rae responded on 14 February that Waqa's decision had been made in error. He had written to the registrar, he said, to correct the mistake, and would remain in office pending a reply.

Union president Salesh Naidu told Fiji Village on 2 March that the union was seeking a judicial review of the decision to remove Rae. On 10 March, the High Court granted a stay order, allowing Rae to remain in office pending the outcome of the judicial review.
