= Jioji Kotobalavu =

Fijian civil servant

Jioji Kotobalavu is a former Fijian civil servant who served as chief executive in the Prime Minister's office under five Prime Ministers. He now works as a lecturer at the University of Fiji.

Kotobalavu was born on the island of Oneata in Lau Province and educated at Lelean Memorial School and Queen Victoria School. He graduated with an MA from the University of Auckland and a Diploma of Diplomacy from Oxford University. After returning to Fiji he was appointed Secretary of Foreign Affairs, becoming Fiji's youngest permanent secretary. In 1981 he was appointed ambassador to Japan. In 1986 he left the civil service to head the South Pacific Applied Geoscience Commission. In 1992 he was nominated to head the South Pacific Commission, but withdrew his nomination suddenly to take up the position of permanent secretary to the Fijian Prime Minister's Office.

On 23 September 2005, he was made to apologise to the High Court of Fiji for making statements defending the Prime Minister Laisenia Qarase, against allegations of involvement in a Ministry of Agriculture scandal, in which more than F$30 million was allegedly misappropriated. Justice Nazhat Shameem ruled Kotobalavu's comments to be in contempt of court and ordered him to apologise and to refrain from making any further statements until after the trial.

He was dismissed by the military regime during the 2006 Fijian coup d'état. He was later employed as a consultant for office of the Prime Minister of Samoa.

Following the coup he studied law at the University of Fiji, and was later employed as a lecturer in public law.
