= Ema Druavesi =

Fijian politician

Ema Druavesi is a Fijian former trade unionist and politician.

Druavesi was born in Suva and educated at the Fiji Institute of Technology. She worked as a laboratory assistant at the University of the South Pacific and in 1982 became president of USP's staff union. She stood unsuccessfully as a coalition candidate in the Fijian electorate of Kadavu–Tamavua–Suva Suburban in the 1987 Fijian general election. In 1989 she formed the Fiji Garment Workers Union, and campaigned against low wages and sweatshop labour in Fiji's garment industry.

She later became general secretary and spokesperson for the nationalist Soqosoqo ni Vakavulewa ni Taukei party. Following the 2006 Fijian coup d'état she pledged her support to the FijiFirst party.
