= Fiji Truth and Reconciliation Commission =

Restorative justice body in Fiji

- Established: 2024
- Composition method: Restorative justice
- Authorised by: Fiji Truth and Reconciliation Commission Act 2024
- Type of tribunal: TRC

The Fiji Truth and Reconciliation Commission is a restorative justice body established in Fiji to inquire into human rights violations during the period of political disturbance following the 1987 Fijian coups d'état, including the subsequent 2000 and 2006 coups d'état and the Bainimarama military regime. It was chaired by Austrian diplomat Marcus Brand from 2024 to 2025.

== Background ==
The 1987 Fijian coups d'état began a period of political instability in Fiji. Following the coups Fiji became a parliamentary republic, the constitution was rewritten in an effort to entrench i-Taukei supremacy, and then rewritten again in an effort to restore racial harmony. The resulting 1997 Constitution of Fiji failed to resolve underlying tensions over power and land ownership, and the election of Mahendra Chaudhry as Fiji's first Indo-Fijian prime minister resulted in an attempt to restore i-Taukei supremacy in the 2000 Fijian coup d'état.

The 2000 coup saw significant human rights abuses, both as part of the violence and lawlessness surrounding the coup, and the military response. Indo-Fijian villagers were terrorised and driven from their homes, while a subsequent mutiny by Counter Revolutionary Warfare Unit in Suva saw four rebel soldiers tortured to death by loyalists in the aftermath. While coup figurehead George Speight and other coup leaders were prosecuted for treason and imprisoned, others (including future president Naiqama Lalabalavu) had been elected to parliament in the 2001 Fijian general election and subsequently joined the government. When they were ultimately convicted and imprisoned for their crimes, they were released to serve their sentences extramurally after only 11 days, and subsequently allowed to return to their seats in parliament. In addition, there has been ongoing speculation that Speight was merely a front for other forces, and that those ultimately responsible for the coup have never been identified and punished.

The Soqosoqo Duavata ni Lewenivanua (SDL) government of Laisenia Qarase attempted to resolve the issue through the Reconciliation, Tolerance, and Unity Bill, which would have established a South African-style Truth commission and pardoned those who gave evidence. Opposition to the bill by military leader Frank Bainimarama ultimately resulted in the 2006 Fijian coup d'état and a further series of human rights abuses. The Bainimarama military regime imposed a new constitution by decree before a transition to democracy in the 2014 Fijian general election. As with previous post-coup constitutions, the 2013 Constitution of Fiji included a clause providing immunity to the military regimes for its crimes. This immunity was entrenched with a clause stating that it "shall not be reviewed, amended, altered, repealed or revoked".

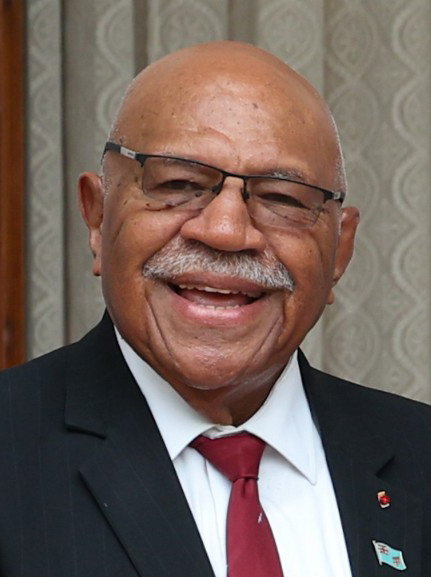
Sitiveni Rabuka has volunteered to testify before the commission.

A truth and reconciliation commission has remained the policy of the SDL's political successors. The Social Democratic Liberal Party included it in their manifesto for the 2014 election. People's Alliance leader (and 1987 coup leader) Sitiveni Rabuka promised a truth and reconciliation commission during the 2022 Fijian general election campaign. In December 2023 the Rabuka government pardoned several of those convicted of involvement in the 2000 coup. Coup leader George Speight was pardoned and released in September 2024.

== Establishment and membership ==
The commission was established by the Fiji Truth and Reconciliation Commission Act 2024. The law was developed by a steering committee led by associate minister for women Sashi Kiran, which ran a public consultation process to develop a draft bill. The act was passed on 5 December 2024, with 33 MPs in support and 15 opposed.

The commission consists of 5 commissioners, 3 of whom must be Fijian citizens. The initial members were Marcus Brand, Sekove Naqiolevu, Rachna Nath, Ana Laqeretabua and Rajendra Hiralal Dass. They were sworn in on 30 January 2025. After a three-month preparatory period it will hold hearings for 18 months, before reporting to the president of Fiji.

The commission is empowered to hear evidence in confidence and is forbidden to identify any individual without their consent, unless they have been previously publicly identified. Evidence given to the commission cannot be used in any civil or criminal case, except for those related to misleading the commission. The goal of the commission's inquiry is social accountability and truth-telling, rather than prosecution.

Parallel to the establishment of the commission the Republic of Fiji Military Forces began its own reconciliation process and committed to ending its coup culture.

In January 2025 incumbent prime minister and former coup leader Sitiveni Rabuka said he would voluntarily testify before the commission and identify those behind the 1987 and 2000 coups to the commission.
