= China-Pacific relations =

Diplomatic competition between Mainland China and Taiwan in the Pacific

China–Pacific relations
- China: Oceania

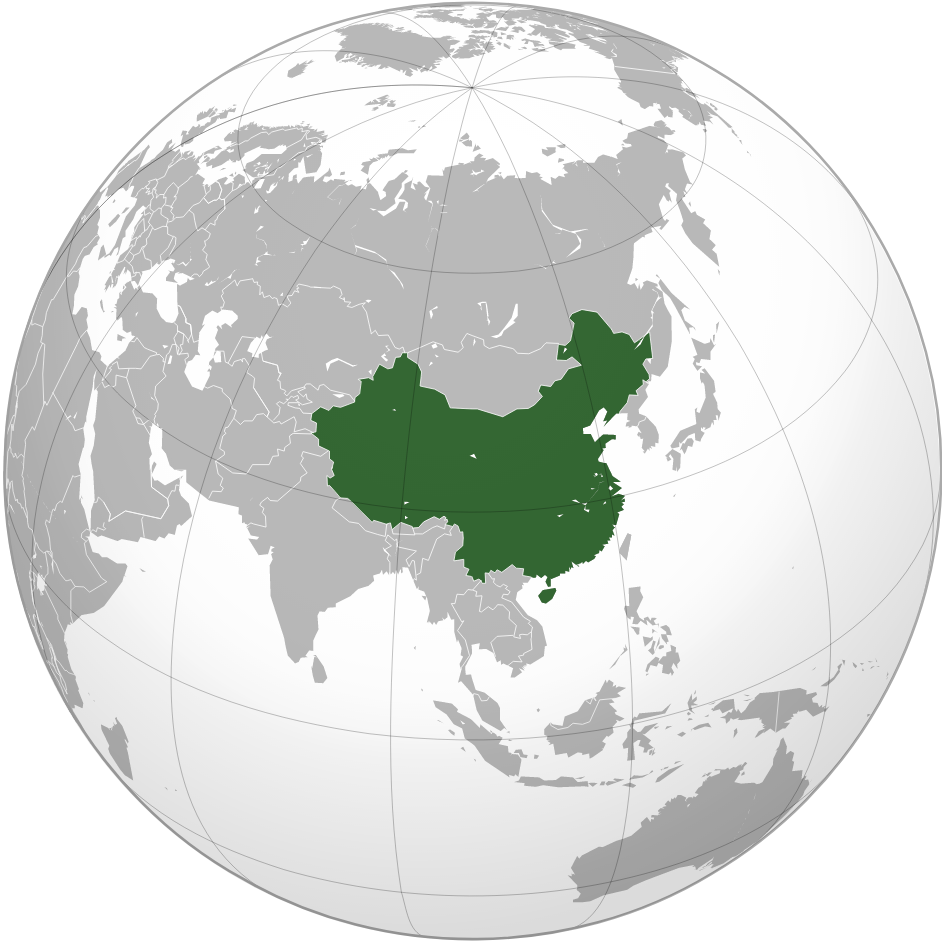
China

Oceania

Oceania is, to the People's Republic of China, a stage for continuous diplomatic competition. The PRC dictates that no state can have diplomatic relations with both the PRC and the ROC. As of 2024, eleven states in Oceania have diplomatic relations with the PRC, and three have diplomatic relations with the ROC. These numbers fluctuate as Pacific Island nations re-evaluate their foreign policies, and occasionally shift diplomatic recognition between Beijing and Taipei. The issue of which "Chinese" government to recognize has become a central theme in the elections of numerous Pacific island nations, and has led to several votes of no-confidence.

Although both Australia and New Zealand have long recognized the PRC and maintain stable and cordial relationships, the PRC and the ROC continue to actively court diplomatic favours from small Pacific island nations, which commentators have referred to as "checkbook diplomacy", usually in the form of developmental aid, or in the case of the PRC, by providing assistance in building large government complexes, stadiums, or infrastructure. According to Taiwanese newspaper The China Post, "Taiwan and China compete ferociously for diplomatic ties, and both sides have given away millions of dollars to bolster diplomatic relations or steal allies from each other."

Several Pacific island states receive significant amounts of development aid from the ROC or the PRC. Hamish McDonald of The Age thus reported in 2003 that "[p]laying off China against Taiwan for diplomatic recognition continues as a lucrative export earner for tiny Pacific island nations". The ROC's Pacific allies pledge in return to promote Taiwan's interests in the United Nations, and do so actively.

In addition, several Pacific countries, including Australia, Fiji, New Zealand, Papua New Guinea, Samoa, Solomon Islands, Tonga, and Vanuatu have ethnic minorities of Chinese descent among their citizens. There are an estimated 80,000 "overseas Chinese" in the Pacific Islands, including 20,000 in Fiji and 20,000 in Papua New Guinea. Countries including Australia, Papua New Guinea, and Vanuatu have also attracted Chinese businesses and investments.

== Regional policies of the People's Republic of China ==
In 2003, the People's Republic of China announced it intended to enhance its diplomatic ties with the Pacific Islands Forum, and increase the economic aid package it provided to that organisation. At the same time, PRC delegate Zhou Whenzhong added: "[T]he PIF should refrain from any exchanges of an official nature or dialogue partnership of any form with Taiwan".

In 2006, Chinese Premier Wen Jiabao announced that the PRC would increase its economic cooperation with Pacific Island States. The PRC would provide more economic aid, abolish tariffs for exports from the Pacific's least developed countries, annul the debt of those countries, distribute free anti-malaria medicines, and provide training for two thousand Pacific Islander government officials and technical staff. That year also saw the formal establishment of a "China–Pacific Islands Economic Development Forum".

Also in 2006, Wen became the first Chinese premier to visit the Pacific islands, which the Taipei Times described as "a longtime diplomatic battleground for China and Taiwan". Similarly, according to Ron Crocombe, Professor of Pacific Studies at the University of the South Pacific, "There have been more Pacific Islands minister visits to China than to any other country".

In 2007, Xinhua, the official press agency of the PRC, stated that Pacific Islands Forum member countries had "spoke[n] highly of the generous assistance China has provided to the region over the past many years and expressed the hope for a further enhanced cooperation with China".

In December 2007, Dr John Lee of the magazine Islands Business asked himself and his readers:

"Why is China so interested in the Pacific? After all, despite the differences in size, population, wealth, and influence between China and islands in the region, the Chinese have literally rolled out the red carpet for Pacific leaders. Meetings between Chinese and Pacific leaders are not perfunctory ‘meet and greets’ in the bland boardrooms of hotels. They are often elaborate state functions with all the bells and whistles that state meetings can offer. [...] In a word, the Chinese want ‘influence’. China sends more diplomats around the world than any other country. [...] In terms of the Pacific, there is a more disturbing game being played out, namely the ‘chequebook diplomacy’, that is taking place between China and Taiwan in their competition for diplomatic recognition at the expense of the other. Taiwan matters profoundly to China—and it is largely why China is interested in the Pacific."

That same month, John Henderson of Canterbury University stated that, in his view, many Pacific Islanders are worried "that their livelihood is being taken away by Chinese traders coming in, often getting in buying political privileges, playing a role in rigging elections". Henderson suggested that the 2006 anti-Chinese riots in Tonga and Solomon Islands could be repeated in countries such as Fiji and Vanuatu. He added that this might lead the PRC to increase its role in the region further, in order to protect ethnic Chinese Pacific Islanders. A spokesman for the Chinese embassy in Fiji, Hu Lihua, responded by stating: "China does not pose a military threat to any other country. China opposes all forms of hegemonism and power politics and will never seek hegemony or engage in expansion." A representative of Fiji's Chinese community similarly rejected the idea that there might be anti-Chinese riots in Fiji, and added: "The Chinese in Fiji have an excellent relationship with locals and we contribute toward the economy. We have been successful in understanding local customs. Many of us have learnt the language and have assimilated."

The final report of the April 2008 Australia 2020 Summit addressed China's influence in the Pacific in the following terms:

"It was noted that so far China did not seem interested in exporting its political values. Its interaction with the region was economically focused or motivated by rivalry with Taiwan.
Noting China's growing military power and its emerging role as a major aid donor in the region, participants agreed that while China's visibility had increased rapidly there remained uncertainty over what it was seeking to achieve, especially in the long term. Securing energy supplies was one obvious goal. One strand of thought that had emerged was that the Chinese themselves were not entirely clear about their aims in the region."

In June 2008, a report from the Lowy Institute stated that China's aid policy towards the Pacific was almost certainly aimed solely at encouraging Pacific countries not to grant diplomatic recognition to Taiwan, and that there was no sign of the PRC attempting to increase its military influence or its access to the region's natural resources. Reuters reports that, according to the Institute's findings, "China's chequebook diplomacy in the South Pacific and secrecy over its aid programme to small island nations is having a destabilising impact on the region", due to "concerns that dollar diplomacy was influencing local politics." A spokesman of the Chinese Foreign Ministry responded: "This assistance is on the basis of mutual benefit. It must help the local economy to develop and promote people's livelihoods. China would never interfere in these countries' internal affairs."

In June 2009, parliamentary delegations from four Pacific Island countries were jointly received by Wu Bangguo, Chairman of the Standing Committee of the National People's Congress. The delegation comprised Isaac Figir, Speaker of the Congress of the Federated States of Micronesia, Tu'ilakepa, Speaker of the Legislative Assembly of Tonga, Manu Korovulavula, head of the Public Accounting Commission of Fiji, and Billy Talagi, head of the Legislative Committee of Niue (a dependent territory of New Zealand). The delegation also met Chinese Premier Wen Jiabao, who spoke of increased "economic and trade cooperation"; Xinhua reported that the Pacific Island legislators "expressed appreciation for China's assistance" and "reiterated their countries' adherence to the one-China policy".

In August and September 2010, the People's Liberation Army Navy began an unprecedented "goodwill visit" to its Pacific allies, touring Papua New Guinea, Vanuatu, Tonga, New Zealand and Australia. Its aim, as reported by the People's Daily during the ships' four-day stop in Tonga, was "enhancing friendship and strengthening military cooperation".

In April 2011, the Lowy Institute issued a new report noting that China, in its approach to the Pacific, had been "shifting from grant aid to soft loans", which were "leading to increasing problems of indebtedness" and "making Pacific governments vulnerable to political pressure from Beijing". The report suggested that countries may struggle to repay the loans within the set timeframe, and that "outstanding loans may well tie Pacific countries to Beijing", in a context of diplomatic competition with Taipei. The report also noted, however, that some loans "are destined for projects that will create economic growth; growth that will create jobs, reduce poverty and help make repayments".

In May 2011, addressing the University of South Pacific in Suva, PRC Ambassador to Fiji Han Zhiqiang stated that China-Pacific cooperation had resulted in "plenty of substantial outcomes and benefits for the people in this region". He indicated that the volume of trade between the PRC and Pacific Island countries had increased by about 50% between 2009 and 2010, reaching € 2.46 billion. The value of China's exports to the region that year was €1.74 billion (up by 42% from 2009), while the value of its imports from the Pacific Islands was €730 million, up almost 100%. Chinese investments in the Pacific Islands in 2010 -primarily to Samoa, the Marshall Islands, Papua New Guinea and Fiji- had reached almost €72 million.

In April 2012 China continued to widen its diplomatic influence with loans and aid with the region.

In 2019, Lowly Institute, after doing a systematic review of the evidence, published a report that concluded that "China has not been engaged in debt-trap diplomacy in the Pacific, as of yet". They also found that Chinese lending in the region were hardly predatory and that in comparison to its usual lending that are typically at market rates to other parts of the world, it appeared that China has been much more gentler in their loans to Pacific islands, with the overwhelming majority of loans having rates that were concessional enough to qualify as aid. Tonga was the only country in the region that had China as a dominant creditor, but the report's authors argued that this did not confer an advantageous position to China since they had to agree to defer repayments twice, yet getting not much in return. However, they also noted that the majority of the Pacific nations that are currently indebted to China have little scope to take on more debts and recommended China to give more grant assistance, rather than more loans, to avoid the risk of overburdening Pacific island nations with too much debts.

== Bilateral relations ==
=== Australia ===
Australia recognises the People's Republic of China and as an emerging and developing economy, China is a very important trading partner and destination for Australian raw material export for the growth of Australian economy. The two countries are currently strengthening their economic relations. The 2007 election of Kevin Rudd as Prime Minister of Australia has been seen as favourable to China-Australian relations, notably since he is the first Australian Prime Minister to speak fluent Mandarin, and that closer engagement with Asia is one of the "Three Pillars" of his foreign policy.

In 2004, Rudd, who at the time was Shadow Minister for Foreign Affairs, had delivered a speech in Beijing entitled "Australia and China: A Strong and Stable Partnership for the 21st Century".

In February 2008, Australia reportedly "chastised Taiwan for its renewed push for independence" and "reiterated its support for a one-China policy". In April, however, Rudd addressed Chinese students at Peking University, and, speaking in Mandarin, referred to "significant human rights problems in Tibet". Rudd also raised the issue in talks with Chinese Premier Wen Jiabao, in a context of "simmering diplomatic tension" according to TV3. In August 2008, Rudd met Wen once more, and expressed his concerns on "questions of human rights, of religious freedom, of Tibet, of internet freedom". For Australia-Taiwan relations that Australia does not object Taiwan's participation in international organization where such consensus has already achieved, and Australia-Taiwan relations are commercially and unofficially-driven, such as the Australia-Taiwan Business Council, which is based in Sydney, and with the understanding of people-to-people contacts in areas of education, science, sports and arts, see. Republic of China has an official, government-sponsored branch office of Taiwan External Trade Development Council in Sydney. Australian Consulate-General in Hong Kong is responsible for Visa and Citizenship matters for applicants in Taiwan.

=== Fiji ===
Fiji recognises the People's Republic of China. Fiji was the first Pacific Island country to establish diplomatic relations with China, in 1975. Fiji's current ambassador to China is Sir James Ah Koy. China's ambassador to Fiji is Cai Jinbiao.

Among the Pacific Island countries, Fiji was, in 2010, the second largest importer of Chinese exports, after Papua New Guinea, and had a trade deficit of A$127m in its trade relations with China.

Fiji's foreign policy under Prime Minister Laisenia Qarase (2000–2006) was (in the latter's own words) to "look north" – i.e., strengthen its relations with Asia in general and China in particular. Qarase stated: "We look now for new markets, where there is flexibility of entry and a readiness to meet the export needs of small, isolated island countries. This is what we would like to engage on with China as we increasingly look north for the answers to our trade and investment aspirations."

Following the military coup in Fiji in December 2006, the PRC distanced itself from the Western nations which condemned the overthrow of Qarase's government. Chinese Ministry of Foreign Affairs deputy director general Deng Hongbo stated:

"We have always respected Fiji's status as an independent nation and we have called on the other countries to do the same and reconsider their attitudes towards Fiji and the current situation in the country."

The post-coup "interim government" led by Commodore Frank Bainimarama has continued Qarase's "look north" policy. In July 2007, Finance Minister Mahendra Chaudhry responded to the contrast between Western criticism and Chinese support for Bainimarama's government:

“Fiji has friends in China, it has friends in Korea, it has friends in [...] other Asian countries. We’re no longer relying on Australia and New Zealand. And in any event, the United States was not doing much for Fiji anyway.”

Later that year, a China/Fiji Trade and Economic Commission was set up to enhance economic relations between the two countries. The PRC has maintained a position of support, calling on other countries to show "understanding" for Fiji's situation. And although Fiji has no diplomatic relations with Taiwan, the latter's Trade Mission representative in Fiji, Victor Chin, has also called on the international community not to pressure Fiji: “I think we should give the interim government the benefit of the doubt. They committed to have an election when everything is ready. I think we should take their words [sic] for it.”

In March 2008, following unrest in Tibet, Fiji expressed its support for China's actions in dealing with rioting in Lhasa. Shortly thereafter, police in Fiji arrested seventeen people who were protesting in support of Tibet outside China's embassy in Suva. Those arrested were "mainly women who had gathered peacefully", according to a Radio New Zealand International correspondent, and included human rights activist Shamima Ali.

A May 2008 article in the Sydney Morning Herald stated that "China's aid to Fiji has skyrocketed since the coup in December 2006", from €650,000 to over €100,000,000. The author of the article commented: "Just as Australia and other Western donors are trying to squeeze [Fiji's] rebel Government, China has dramatically stepped up its aid, effectively dissipating any pressure Western donors might have been generating." The author suggested that China did not wish to risk antagonising Fiji and thus unwittingly push the Bainimarama government towards seeking aid from Taiwan: "China clearly finds itself boxed into a corner. On the one hand, Western states are asking it to help isolate the new dictatorship in Fiji. On the other, China faces the risk of losing a Fiji starved of funds to its renegade province, Taiwan."

In August 2008, while on a visit to China, Commodore Bainimarama spoke of the "very close and cordial relations that our two countries share in our trade, cultural and sporting linkages", and added:

"Fiji will not forget that when other countries were quick to condemn us following the events of 1987, 2000 and 2006, China and other friends in Asia demonstrated a more understanding and sensitive approach to events in Fiji. The Government of the People's Republic of China expressed confidence in our ability to resolve our problems in our way, without undue pressure of interference."

In February 2009, at a time when Fiji was facing pressure from the Pacific Islands Forum over its apparent lack of progress towards a restoration of democracy, Chinese vice-president Xi Jinping paid a state visit to Fiji and met Prime Minister Bainimarama. On that occasion, Xi stated that he wished to "further enhance [China-Fiji] exchanges and cooperation in such fields as culture, education, public health and tourism". Xinhua reported that, during Xi's visit, China and Fiji had "signed a number of cooperative deals" by which China would provide Fiji with "economic and technical assistance". China committed itself to increasing its imports from Fiji. Bainimarama, for his part, re-affirmed his country's recognition of the One China policy, and, as reported by Fiji Village, "thanked the Chinese government for fully recognizing Fiji's sovereignty and adopting a policy of non-interference in its domestic affairs".

In May, Vice-President of Fiji Ratu Epeli Nailatikau described Fiji's "relationship with the government and the people of the People's Republic of China as one of its most important".

In June 2009, the Fiji Democracy and Freedom Movement, an organisation founded in Australia to campaign for the restoration of democracy in Fiji, sent a petition to the Chinese embassy in Canberra, asking China to "withdraw support for the military regime". At the same time, Australian Foreign Minister Stephen Smith asked China "not to use [its] contacts with Fiji to undermine efforts to pressure Fiji to hold elections".

Despite close relations between Fiji and the PRC, Taiwan provides continuous free medical assistance to the country. A Taiwanese medical team visits Fiji on an annual basis to offer its services in hospitals and clinics. The Fiji government has expressed its gratitude for the help.

In 2024, the Organized Crime and Corruption Reporting Project (OCCRP) and The Age reported on connections between Chinese organized crime figures and the Chinese Communist Party's political influence operations in Fiji.

=== Kiribati ===
Kiribati, under the current government of President Taneti Mamau, recognises the People's Republic of China.

From 1980 to 2003, Kiribati recognised the PRC. Relations between China and Kiribati then became a contentious political issue within Kiribati. Kiribati President Teburoro Tito was ousted in a parliamentary vote of no confidence in 2003, over his refusal to clarify the details of a land lease which had enabled Beijing to maintain a satellite-tracking station in the country since 1997, and over Chinese ambassador Ma Shuxue's acknowledged monetary donation to "a cooperative society linked to Tito". In the ensuing election, Anote Tong won the presidency after "stirring suspicions that the station was being used to spy on US installations in the Pacific". Tong had previously pledged to "review" the lease.

In November 2003, Tarawa established diplomatic relations with Taipei, a decision which The Age referred to as "play[ing] the Taiwan card"-, and Beijing severed its relations with the country. For the PRC, the presence of the satellite-tracking station had made relations with Kiribati relatively important; the station had, in particular, been used to track Yang Liwei's spaceflight. Therefore, for three weeks the PRC called upon Kiribati President Anote Tong to break off relations with ROC and re-affirm his support for the One-China policy. Only after those three weeks did the PRC sever relations, thereby losing the right to maintain its satellite-tracking base in Kiribati. The ROC began providing economic aid to Kiribati, while Kiribati began supporting Taiwan in the United Nations.

In 2004, President Tong said he believed the PRC was still trying to exert influence over his country. The comment was mainly due to the PRC's refusal to remove all its personnel from its closed embassy. Tong stated that the Chinese personnel, who remained in Kiribati against his wishes, were handing out anti-government pamphlets; he told New Zealand journalist Michael Field: "I am sure if we did this in Beijing we would be in jail in half a second". Tong's brother and main political opponent, Harry Tong, responded by accusing ROC of having too much influence on Kiribati, and notably of influencing the country's clergy.

In 2008, ROC settled Kiribati's unpaid bills to Air Pacific, enabling the airline to maintain its services from Tarawa to Kiritimati.

In November 2010, despite their lack of diplomatic relations, the PRC was one of 15 countries to attend the Tarawa Climate Change Conference in Kiribati, and one of 12 to sign the Ambo Declaration on climate change issued from the conference.

On 31 May 2013, Kiribati opened an embassy in Taipei, the first ever i-Kiribati embassy outside of Oceania. Teekoa Iuta became Kiribati's first ambassador to the country. President Taneti Mamau visited Taiwan to attend the inauguration of President Tsai Ing-wen on 20 May 2016.

On 20 September 2019, Kiribati broke ties with the ROC and recognized the PRC as the sole legitimate government of China.

=== Marshall Islands ===
The Marshall Islands recognise the Republic of China, and is one of the few countries to maintain an embassy in Taipei. The magazine Islands Business reported that President Litokwa Tomeing, elected in January 2008, might break off his country's diplomatic relations with Taiwan, and turn instead to the PRC. However, in office Tomeing expressed continued support for ties with Taiwan and met with the Vice President of the ROC, Annette Lu, when she visited the Marshall Islands on 29 January 2008.

In September 2022, two Chinese nationals were charged in U.S. federal court "in connection with a scheme to bribe elected officials of the Republic of the Marshall Islands (RMI) in exchange for passing certain legislation." They were alleged to have attempted to establish a mini-state on the Marshall Islands.

=== Federated States of Micronesia ===
The Federated States of Micronesia recognise the People's Republic of China. In 2007, the FSM opened an embassy in Beijing.

=== Nauru ===
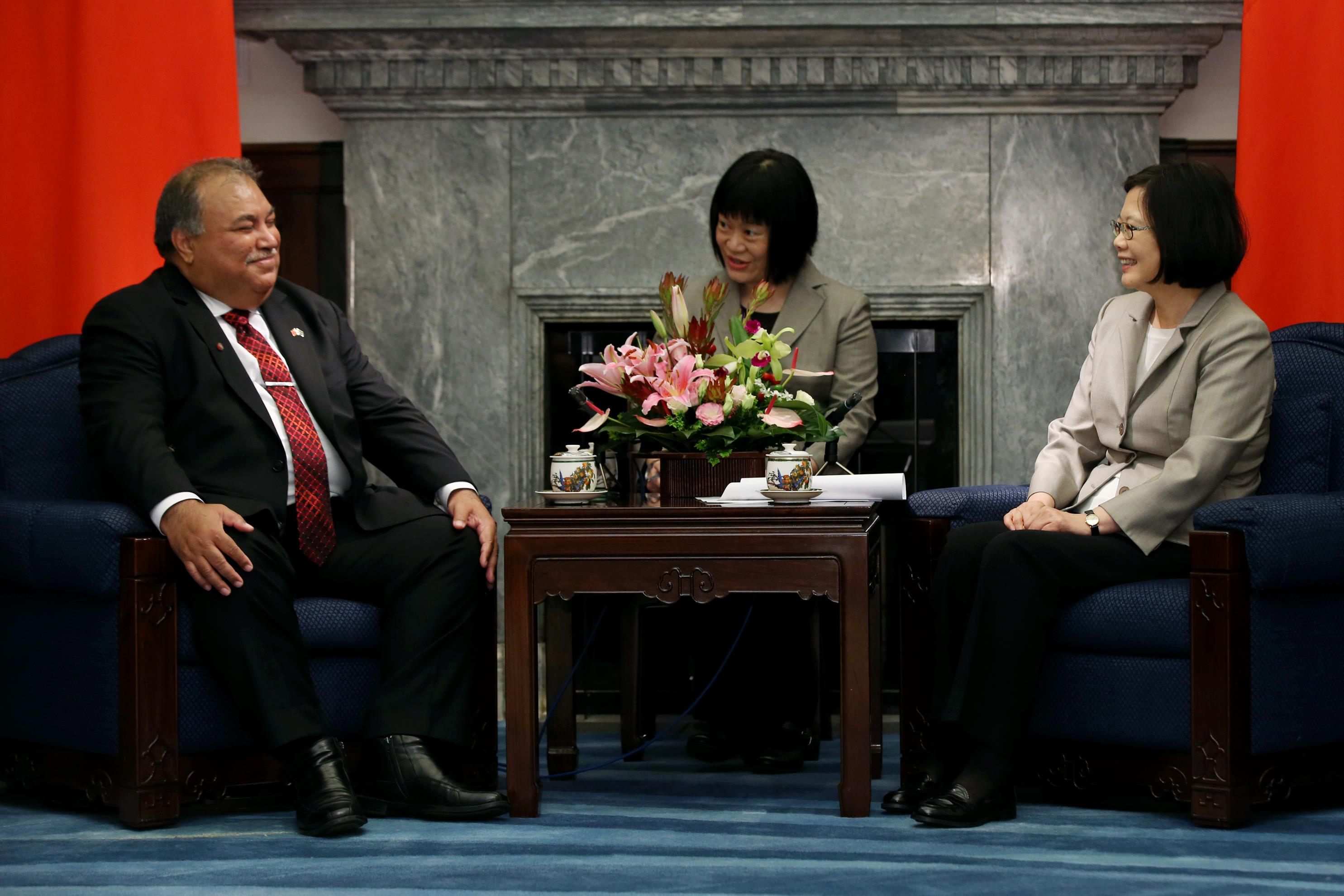
Nauru President Baron Waqa and ROC President Tsai Ing-wen in Taiwan.

Nauru recognises the People's Republic of China.

In 1980, Nauru first established official relations with the Republic of China. In 2002, however, the government of Rene Harris established relations with the PRC, which entailed a solemn recognition of the "One China" policy by Nauru. Consequently, Taiwan severed its relations with Nauru, and accused the PRC of having bought Nauru's allegiance with a financial aid gift of over €90,000,000. A reporter for The Age agreed, stating that "Beijing recently bought off a threat by Nauru to revert to Taiwan only six months after opening ties with the mainland, offering a large loan to Nauru's near-destitute Government".

In 2003, however, Nauru closed its newly established embassy in Beijing. Two years later, ROC President Chen Shui-bian met Nauruan President Ludwig Scotty in the Marshall Islands. In May 2005, the ROC and Nauru re-established diplomatic relations, and opened embassies in each other's capitals. The PRC consequently severed its relations with Nauru.

The Republic of China is one of Nauru's two foremost economic aid partners (the other being Australia). In return, Nauru uses its seat in the United Nations to support the ROC's admittance bid. Taiwan also provides regular medical assistance to Nauru, sending specialised doctors to the tiny country's only hospital.

In 2007, Scotty was re-elected President of Nauru, amidst claims that his electoral campaign had been funded by Taiwan. Scotty's opponents claimed that the ROC wanted to ensure that a pro-Taiwan government remained in power. Scotty was replaced by Marcus Stephen in December 2007. Following Stephen's election, ROC President Chen Shui-bian telephoned him to congratulate him, assure him of the ROC's continued assistance for Nauru, request Nauru's continued support in return, and invite him to visit Taiwan. Nauru has retained its relations with the ROC under the new government.

Given that it has already changed its foreign policy twice, Nauru remains the focus of diplomatic competition between Beijing and Taipei. In 2006, according to the New Statesman, President Scotty "was allegedly accosted by a horde of screaming Chinese officials who tried to drag him on to a plane to Beijing just as he was boarding one bound for Taipei".

In 2008, Nauru co-submitted a proposal to the United Nations, requesting that the United Nations General Assembly consider enabling "Taiwan's participation in the activities of UN specialized agencies". The proposal was rejected.

In 2011 it was revealed via WikiLeaks that Taiwan had been paying a "monthly stipend" to Nauruan government ministers in exchange for their continued support, as well as a smaller sum to other Members of Parliament, as "project funding that requires minimal accounting". Reporting on the story, the Brisbane Times wrote: "One MP reportedly used his Taiwanese stipend to buy daily breakfast for all schoolchildren in his district, while others were happy to just pocket the cash". A "former Australian diplomat with close knowledge of politics in Nauru" stated that Nauruan President Marcus Stephen, Foreign Minister Kieren Keke and former President Ludwig Scotty, among others, had all accepted "under the counter" funding from Taiwan. The leaks revealed that "Chinese [PRC] agents had also sought to influence Nauru's elections through cash payments to voters, with at least $40,000 distributed in one instance in 2007".

WikiLeaks also revealed that Australia had, during the administration of Kevin Rudd, been "pushing" Nauru to break its relations with Taiwan and establish relations with the PRC instead. Then President Ludwig Scotty had reportedly resisted on the grounds that it was "none of Australia's business".

In late 2011, Taiwan "doubled it health aid" to Nauru, notably providing a resident medical team on a five-year appointment.

In 2018, a diplomatic row between the PRC and Nauru occurred at the Pacific Islands Forum when Nauruans would only stamp entry visas on personal passports of Mainland diplomats rather than diplomatic ones.

On 15 January 2024, Nauru chose to recognize the People's Republic of China, severing diplomatic ties with Taiwan. Nauru was reportedly offered US$100 million a year in aid to recognize the PRC.

=== New Zealand ===
New Zealand recognises the People's Republic of China. Diplomatic relations were first established in 1972. China's ambassador to New Zealand, Zhang Limin, is also accredited to New Zealand's associated territories, the Cook Islands and, since 2008, Niue. The People's Republic of China in December 2007 became the first country to establish official diplomatic relations with Niue, and provides economic aid to the Cook Islands.

In September 2007, New Zealand reaffirmed its adherence to the "One China" policy.

In April 2008, New Zealand became the first developed country to sign a free trade agreement with the PRC.

On 29 September 2008, New Zealand's delegate in United Nations openly praised the improving relations between the two governments of Beijing and Taipei.

In July 2009, Niuean Premier Toke Talagi stated that, if development aid were not forthcoming from New Zealand, he would request aid from China instead.

On 10 July 2013, New Zealand and Republic of China (Taiwan) signed a bilateral Economic Cooperation Agreement.

=== Palau ===
Palau recognises the Republic of China, and is one of the few countries to maintain an embassy in Taipei. The ROC provides scholarships to Palauan students, as well as computers for Palauan schools. In 2008, Mario Katosang, Palau's Minister of Education, stated:

"We were given 100 Windows-based computers by Taiwan. The education sector uses predominantly Apple Macintosh computers, so I mentioned that we may also need software. Taiwan immediately delivered 100 brand new copies of Windows XP, and offered to train our computer technicians."

Journalists have reported on PRC united front influence operations linked to Chinese organized crime in Palau. Resort investments in Palau have been proposed by the Prince Group, a Chinese-Cambodian conglomerate founded by Chinese businessman Chen Zhi, which has been previously linked to money laundering, online scams, and human trafficking.

=== Papua New Guinea ===
Papua New Guinea recognises the People's Republic of China. Diplomatic relations were established in 1976, soon after Papua New Guinea became independent.

Papua New Guinea is one of China's biggest trade partners in Oceania. Papua New Guinea exports far more to China than does any other Pacific Island country, and imports three times more from China than does any other such country. It is also one of the few countries in the region to maintain a trade surplus in its relations with China; its surplus reached a record high of A$427m in 2010.

In 1999, the government of Prime Minister Bill Skate recognised Taiwan. Skate lost power less than a week later, and Papua New Guinea's diplomatic recognition reverted to China.

In 2003, the PRC's embassy in Port Moresby published a statement of concern in reaction to comments in the Papua New Guinea press questioning the justification for PNG's relations with the People's Republic. The embassy statement insisted that relations between the two countries were mutually beneficial, reasserted the PRC's claims to Taiwan, and concluded: "It is our sincere hope that the local [PNG] media will report on China and its relations with PNG in a just and objective way, so as to further enhance the mutual understanding and friendship between the peoples of our two countries."

In July 2003, PNG Governor General Sir Silas Atopare visited the PRC, re-affirmed his country's adherence to the One China policy, and, according to a statement published by the PRC's embassy, "thank[ed] the government and the people of China for their commitment in providing aid to PNG's development".

In 2005, relations cooled somewhat when Papua New Guinea, along with Fiji, supported Taiwan's wish to join the World Health Organization.

In May 2008, Taiwan's Foreign Minister James Huang resigned, along with two other top officials, after wasting over €19 million in a failed attempt to win diplomatic recognition for the Republic of China from Papua New Guinea. The misuse of the money caused public outrage, forcing Huang's resignation. Papua New Guinea's foreign minister Sam Abal subsequently confirmed that his country had no intention of recognising Taiwan.

A few days later, it was announced that members of the Papua New Guinea Defence Force would receive training provided by the PRC. Traditionally, military training aid in Papua New Guinea had been provided by Western countries, namely, Australia, New Zealand and the United States.

=== Samoa ===
Samoa recognises the People's Republic of China. Relations were established in 1975.

In the late 1980s, China began sending doctors to the Samoan National Hospital, and sent over a hundred over the following two decades.

Samoa significantly increased its volume of imports from China in the late 2000s, while also increasing its exports to that country. In 2010, Samoa reached a record trade deficit in its relations with China, at A$70m.

In 2007, the PRC provided Samoa with an x-ray machine and several volunteer doctors. In 2008, the PRC donated over €1,360,000 to Samoa to fund its education policies.

In March 2008, following unrest in Tibet, the speaker of the Samoan Fono (legislative assembly), Tolofuaivalelei Falemoe Leiataua, stated that foreign leaders should not interfere with China as it deals with "internal affairs", and that they should not meet the Dalai Lama.

In June 2008, Samoa announced it would be opening diplomatic missions in China and Japan – the country's first diplomatic offices in Asia. In September, the Chinese Ministry of Foreign Affairs issued a statement indicating that China and Samoa have always "conducted fruitful cooperation in the fields of economy, trade, agriculture, sports, culture, education and health, as well as international affairs", and that China intended to "make more tangible efforts to support Samoa's economic and social development".

In 2010, a Chinese government-funded China-Samoa Agricultural Demonstration Farm was established in Nu'u with an aim "to train the Samoan farmers on voluntary basis through Chinese agricultural planting techniques". About 500 Samoan farmers received training from Chinese agricultural experts.

In 2011, 57 Samoan students were studying in China on a Chinese government sponsorship.

=== Solomon Islands ===
Solomon Islands recognises the People's Republic of China.

Solomon Islands and the Republic of China established diplomatic relations on 23 May 1983. A Republic of China consulate general was set up in Honiara, and upgraded to an embassy two years later. Since 2011, the Republic of China's ambassador to the Solomons is Laurie Chan, a Solomon Islands national of Chinese ethnic background, and a former Solomon Islands Minister of Foreign Affairs who supported his country's continued relations with Taiwan.

Despite a lack of diplomatic recognition, however, Solomon Islands trades more with the People's Republic than with Taiwan. In 2009, over half the country's exports went to the People's Republic of China, and Solomon Islands maintained a trade surplus of A$161m in its trade relations with that country. In 2010, that surplus increased to a record A$258m.

In 2006, Honiara's Chinatown suffered extensive damage as it was looted and burned by rioters, following a contested election result. It had been alleged that ethnic Chinese businessmen had bribed members of Solomon Islands' Parliament. Joses Tuhanuku, President of the Solomon Islands Labour Party, stated that the election "has been corrupted by Taiwan and business houses owned by Solomon Islanders of Chinese origin". Many Chinese-Solomon Islanders left the country.

After pro-Taiwan Prime Minister Manasseh Sogavare was ousted in a vote of no confidence in December 2007, and replaced by Derek Sikua, ROC President Chen Shui-bian telephoned Prime Minister Sikua, offering his congratulations and Taiwan's continued aid, and requested the Sikua government's continued diplomatic support. Chen also invited Sikua to visit Taiwan, which he did in March 2008. Sikua was welcomed with military honours by Chen, who stated: "Taiwan is the Solomon Islands' most loyal ally. [...] Taiwan will never forsake the people or government of the Solomon Islands." Solomon Islands has continued to recognise the Republic of China under Sikua's leadership.

Later that same month, Taiwan's president-elect Dr. Ma Ying-Jeou met Australia's former Foreign Minister Alexander Downer, and reportedly promised to put an end to Taiwanese "cheque book diplomacy" in the Solomons. This led Downer to comment: "Under the Chen Shui-bian regime there has been a lot of Taiwanese cheque book diplomacy in Solomon Islands. So I'm glad to hear that's coming to an end." Sikua, however, criticised Downer for interfering in relations between Honiara and Taipei:

“The Government of Solomon Islands will continue to work closely with the Government of Taiwan and other development partners as it strives to provide a better quality of life for its people. I hope that Mr Downer will find something more appropriate to comment on than on issues that are within the sovereign jurisdiction of independent states and governments to deal with and decide on.”

The editor of the Solomon Star reacted irritably to Downer's comments:

"Just when we thought he's gone and good riddance, he's back. Alexander Downer is now in Taipei and telling the Taiwanese how to run their relations with the Solomon Islands. [...] Just who does Mr Downer think he is? [...] Relations between Taiwan and the Solomon Islands are none of this yesterday man's business. Taipei should tell Mr Downer to butt out."

The Taiwanese government subsequently stated, through its deputy director-general of the Ministry of Foreign Affairs' Department of East Asian and Pacific Affairs, Victor Yu, that Downer had "misunderstood" Ma:

"Cooperation and development programs are an obligation and the responsibility of every advanced nation in the international community. They should not be described as 'checkbook diplomacy'. [...] All the resources that the nation has contributed are project-oriented and have generated substantial positive effects on the local economy and on society. Downer distorted what Ma actually meant."

On 17 April 2008, the editorial of the Solomon Star was devoted to the Solomons' relationship with Taiwan, which it described as follows:

"First, thanks to Taiwan, for all the support it is providing to help bring better health services here. There's always suspicion about Taiwan's aid in this country despite the fine sounding intentions under which it is given. [...] Our politicians undoubtedly exploit Taiwan's need to keep Solomon Islands as one of the nations recognising it as a country in its own right. But there should be no doubts about this week's launch of the Taiwan Medical Centre at the National Referral Hospital. This is tangible, beneficial and transparent help. It underscores Taiwan's role as a true, democratic friend of Solomon Islands. May there be more such help given this way."

In July, it was announced that Taiwanese doctors would be providing free medical care to Solomon Islands villagers, and that unskilled Solomon Islands workers would be granted access to the Taiwanese labour market. At the same time, Taiwan was funding rural development projects in the Solomons. Taiwan has also pledged to provide SI$10 million to Solomon Islands in 2009 and 2010, to enable the government to abolish school fees paid by parents and provide free primary and secondary education to Solomon Islands children.

During the campaign for the 2010 general election, candidate and former Prime Minister Francis Billy Hilly announced that, if elected, he would break off relations with the ROC and establish them with the PRC. Dr Tarcisius Tara Kabutaulaka, of the University of Hawaii, commented that Taiwan funded constituency development programmes in the Solomons, and that Members of Parliament were thus unlikely to support any severing of diplomatic relations with the ROC. Billy Hilly was unsuccessful in regaining a seat in Parliament.

In September 2019, the Solomon Islands under Prime Minister Manasseh Sogavare voted to change alliances and recognize the PRC instead of Taiwan, prompting Taiwan to immediately terminate diplomatic relations and close its embassy. It was reported that Solomon Islands politicians were offered hundreds of thousands of dollars in bribes to switch recognition to the PRC. After recognizing the PRC, it was reported that a state-owned company with ties to the Chinese Communist Party secured development rights to the entire island of Tulagi in a deal that could provide the PRC with military access to the island. The Tulagi lease deal was subsequently ruled illegal.

In October 2019, it was announced that the Hong Kong-listed Wanguo International Mining had contracted state-owned China State Railway Group to build $825 million worth of infrastructure on Guadalcanal, in order to develop the Gold Ridge mine outside of Honiara. Critics of the development agreement, including opposition leader Peter Kenilorea, have argued that the terms of the deal are too opaque, and could be a form of debt-trap diplomacy.

=== Tonga ===
Tonga recognises the People's Republic of China. Relations were first established in 1998.

In 2000, noble Tuʻivakano of Nukunuku (later to become Prime Minister) banned all Chinese stores from his Nukunuku District. This followed alleged complaints from other shopkeepers regarding competition from local Chinese. In 2001, Tonga's Chinese community was hit by a wave of about a hundred racist assaults.

That same year, however, Tonga and the PRC decided to strengthen their "military relations". In 2008, the PRC provided Tonga with military supplies worth over €340,000.

In 2006, rioters caused severe damage to shops owned by Chinese-Tongans in Nukuʻalofa.

In April 2008, Tongan King George Tupou V visited China, reaffirmed his country's adherence to the "One China" policy, and, according to the Chinese State news agency Xinhua, "supported the measures adopted to handle the incident in Lhasa". King Tupou V also met Chinese Defense Minister Liang Guanglie to "enhance exchange and cooperation between the two militaries". Xinhua stated that China and Tonga have "fruitful cooperation in politics, economy, trade, agriculture and education, and kept a sound coordination in regional and international affairs".

In early 2010, Chinese aid to Tonga included assistance in the reconstruction of Nuku'alofa's central business district; "an agricultural project in Vaini"; health clinics set up in Vava’u and Vaini; the provision of seven Chinese doctors for a two-year period; and an allocation of €2.2 million "for social and economic development", including "soft loans and interest free loans to the Tonga Government".

In April 2011, the Lowy Institute reported that, of all Pacific countries, Tonga was carrying the highest burden of debt from Chinese loans, amounting to 32% of Tonga's Gross Domestic Product. Simultaneously, the International Monetary Fund warned Tonga was "facing debt distress", a "very high possibility that Tonga [would] be unable to service its debts in the future".

=== Tuvalu ===
Tuvalu recognises the Republic of China. Taiwan maintains the only resident foreign embassy in Tuvalu. This is located in Funafuti. Having established diplomatic in 1979, Tuvalu is "Taiwan's oldest ally in the Pacific region".

Tuvalu supports the ROC's bid to join the United Nations, and Taiwan has provided Tuvalu with "several mobile medical missions".

In 2006, Taiwan reacted to reports that the People's Republic of China was attempting to draw Tuvalu away from the Republic of China. Taiwan consequently strengthened its weakening diplomatic relations with Tuvalu.

On 14 March 2013, a Tuvaluan embassy was opened in Taipei, making the ROC only the third sovereign state to host an embassy of Tuvalu, after Fiji and New Zealand.

=== Vanuatu ===
Vanuatu recognises the People's Republic of China. In November 2004, Prime Minister Serge Vohor briefly established diplomatic relations with the Republic of China, before being ousted for that reason in a vote of no confidence the following month.

In 2006, Vanuatu signed an economic cooperation agreement with the PRC, whereby the latter was to assist Vanuatu's economic development, and remove tariffs on imports from Vanuatu. The PRC also added Vanuatu to its list of approved tourism destinations for Chinese tourists. Ni-Vanuatu trade minister James Bule said his country had also requested China's assistance "in supplying machines so we can establish a plant in Vanuatu to produce bio fuel". By contrast, Opposition leader Serge Vohor has said China is exerting too much influence on the ni-Vanuatu government's policy.

In May 2009, Vanuatu appointed its first ever ambassador to China, former Minister of Finance Willie Jimmy. Jimmy "call[ed] [...] for China to have a foot firmly planted in the Pacific through Port Vila", which -the Vanuatu Daily Post remarked- "no doubt caused ruffled feathers among other foreign diplomatic partners".

In July 2010, Chinese Ambassador Cheng Shuping announced that China would fund a number of projects in Vanuatu, "including the National Convention Centre and the expansion of Prime Minister's Offices", as well as "the design and reconstruction of the Francophone Wing of the University of the South Pacific Emalus Campus".

== China's foreign relations with Oceanian countries ==
Relations between China and Oceania

- Australia–China relations
- China–Fiji relations
- China–Kiribati relations
- China–Marshall Islands relations
- China–Federated States of Micronesia relations
- China–Nauru relations
- China–New Zealand relations
- China–Palau relations
- China–Papua New Guinea relations
- China–Samoa relations
- China–Solomon Islands relations
- China–Tonga relations
- China–Tuvalu relations
- China–Vanuatu relations

== See also ==
- China–Africa relations
- China–Caribbean relations
- China–Latin America relations
