= Demographics of Tonga =

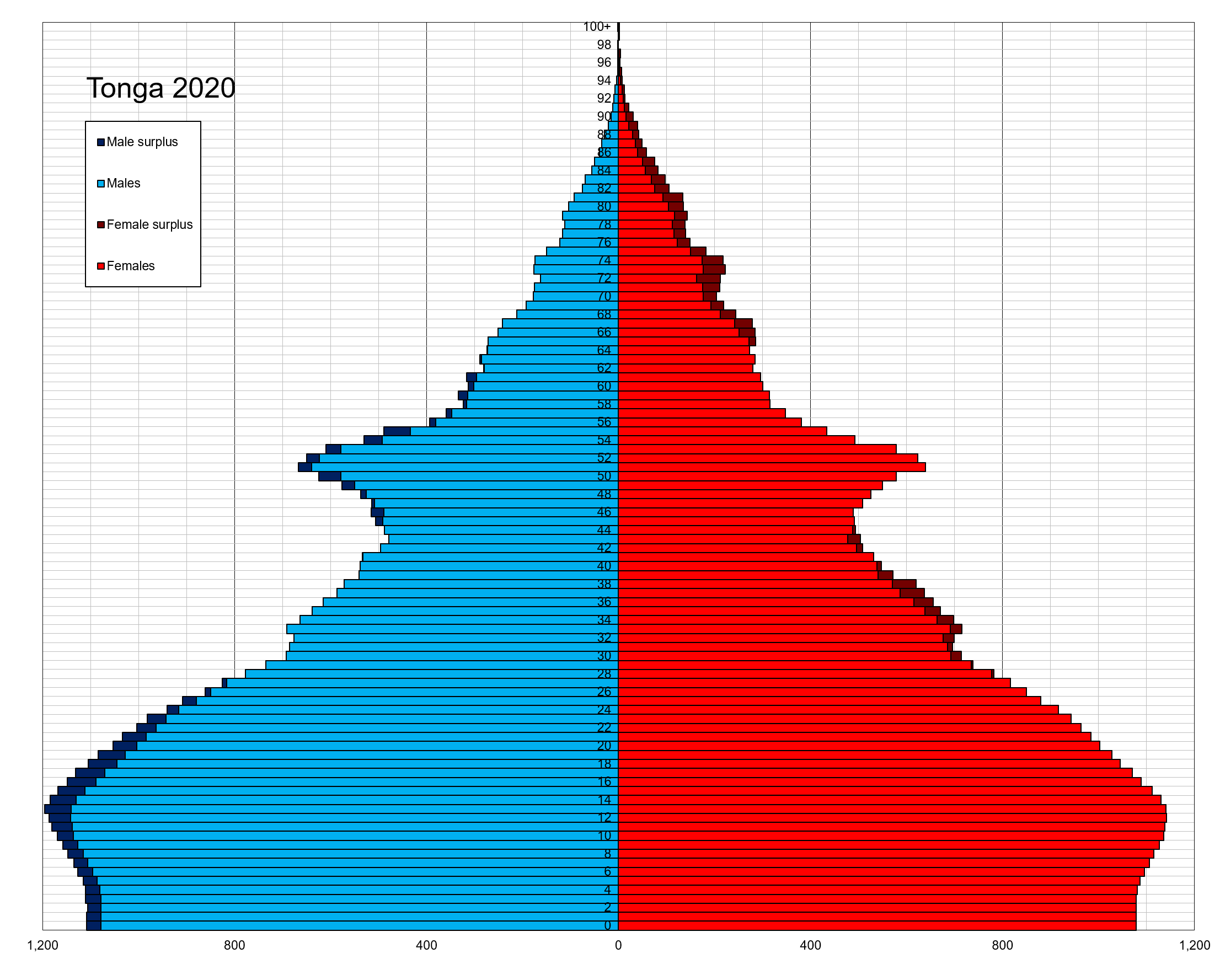
- Population pyramid of Tonga in 2020
- Population: 105,517 (2022 est.)
- Growth rate: -0.26% (2022 est.)
- Birth rate: 20.31 births/1,000 population (2022 est.)
- Death rate: 4.95 deaths/1,000 population (2022 est.)
- Life expectancy: 77.53 years
  - male: 75.89 years
  - female: 79.23 years
- Fertility rate: 2.76 children born/woman (2022 est.)
- Infant mortality rate: 12.41 deaths/1,000 live births
- Net migration rate: -18.01 migrant(s)/1,000 population (2022 est.)

Age structure
- 0–14 years: 32%
- 65 and over: 6.83%

Nationality
- Nationality: Tongan
- Major ethnic: Tongan (97%)

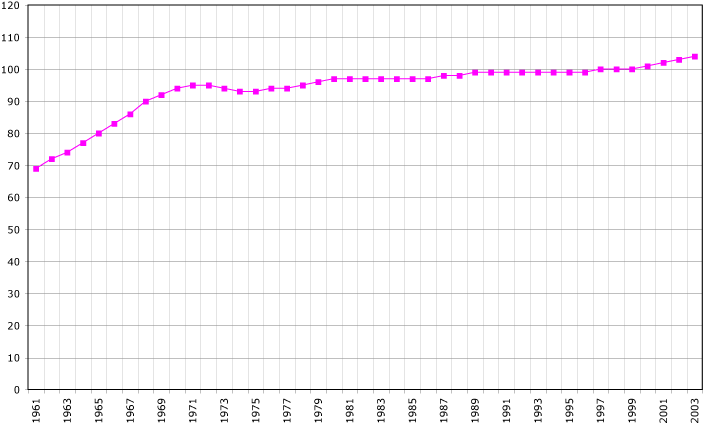
2005 Food and Agriculture Organization data showing the population of Tonga (in thousands) with time

Tongans, a Polynesian group, represent more than 98% of the inhabitants of Tonga. The rest are European (the majority are British), mixed European, and other Pacific Islanders. There also are several hundred Chinese. Almost two-thirds of the population live on its main island, Tongatapu. Although an increasing number of Tongans have moved into the only urban and commercial center, Nukuʻalofa, where European and Indigenous cultural and living patterns have blended, village life and kinship ties continue to be important throughout the country. Everyday life is heavily influenced by Polynesian traditions and especially by the Christian faith; for example, all commerce and entertainment activities cease from midnight Saturday until midnight Sunday, and the constitution declares the Sabbath to be sacred, forever. Other important Christian denominations include Methodists (Free Wesleyan) and Roman Catholics, and the Church of Jesus Christ of Latter-day Saints.

Primary education between ages 6 and 14 is compulsory and free in state schools. Mission schools provide about 83% of the primary and 90% of the secondary level education. Higher education includes teacher training, nursing and medical training, a small private university, a women's business college, and a number of private agricultural schools. Most higher education is pursued overseas.

Based on 2021 estimates, the religious breakdown of the population was Protestant 63.9% (includes Free Wesleyan Church 34.2%, Free Church of Tonga 11.3%, Church of Tonga 6.8%, Tokaikolo Christian Church 1.5%, Assembly of God 2.5%, Seventh Day Adventist 2.5%, Constitutional Church of Tonga 1.2%, and other Protestant 4%), Latter-day Saints 19.7%, Roman Catholic 13.7%, other 2.1%, none 0.6%, unspecified 0.1%.

As the 1960s ended the population growth rate fell rapidly in the country.

== Population ==
In the 1930s, Tonga had a population of about 32,000. Starting in the 1970s large scale migration began to Australia and New Zealand. By the 1970s the emigration rate from Tonga to Australia, New Zealand, United Kingdom, Canada, France and the United States was over 2% annually. The country has over 100,000 residents.

Historical population

Year	Pop.	±% p.a.
1891	19,196	—
1956	56,838	+1.68%
1966	77,429	+3.14%
1976	90,085	+1.53%
1986	94,649	+0.50%

Year	Pop.	±% p.a.
1996	97,784	+0.33%
2006	101,991	+0.42%
2011	103,252	+0.25%
2016	100,651	−0.51%
2021	100,209	−0.09%

=== Structure of the population ===
Population by Sex and Age Group (Census 30.XI.2016):

Age group	Male	Female	Total	%
Total	50 255	50 396	100 651	100
0–4	6 440	6 059	12 499	12.42
5–9	6 417	5 736	12 153	12.07
10–14	6 139	5 743	11 882	11.81
15–19	5 449	5 053	10 502	10.43
20–24	4 106	4 128	8 234	8.18
25–29	3 162	3 467	6 629	6.59
30–34	2 994	3 527	6 521	6.48
35–39	2 704	2 941	5 645	5.61
40–44	2 473	2 716	5 189	5.16
45–49	2 600	2 581	5 181	5.15
50–54	2 129	2 021	4 150	4.12
55–59	1 571	1 683	3 254	3.23
60–64	1 297	1 399	2 696	2.68
65-69	968	1 062	2 030	2.02
70-74	735	866	1 601	1.59
75-79	575	675	1 250	1.24
80-84	315	410	725	0.72
85-89	127	231	358	0.36
90-94	25	74	99	0.10
95-99	5	5	10	0.01
100+	1	1	2	<0.01
Age group	Male	Female	Total	Percent
0–14	18 996	17 538	36 534	36.30
15–64	28 485	29 516	58 001	57.63
65+	2 751	3 324	6 075	6.04
unknown	23	18	41	0.04

== Vital statistics ==
=== Registered births and deaths ===
Year	Population	Live births	Deaths	Natural increase	Crude birth rate	Crude death rate	Rate of natural increase	TFR
1986	94,649							5.2
1996	97,784				30.3	7.5	22.8	4.1
2000		2,696	672	2,024				
2001		2,546	579	1,967				
2002		2,662	591	2,076				
2003		2,781	617	2,164				
2006	101,991	2,945	709	2,236	29.0	7.0	22.0	4.2
2011	103,252	2,896	699	2,197	28.0	6.8	21.2	3.9
2013		2,887	759	2,128				
2014		2,875	939	1,936				
2015		2,848	805	2,043				
2016	100,651	2,632	830	1,802	24.0	5.8	18.2	3.5
2017		2,463	836	1,627				
2018		2,093	728	1,365				
2019		2,178	455	1,723				
2020		1,798	575	1,223				
2021	100,179	1,424						

== Migration ==
=== Emigration ===
There are over 150,000 people of Tongan descent living outside of Tonga, mostly in New Zealand, the United States, and Australia.

==== Oceania ====
82,389 New Zealanders identified themselves as being of Tongan ethnicity with 22,413 stating that they were born in Tonga. As of 2016, Tongan New Zealanders make up 1.2% of New Zealand's population of approximately 5 million people. There is a Tongan Australian population of 32,691 people, which is over 0.1% of Australia's population. 60% of Tongan people live in New South Wales.

==== United States ====
In the U.S., Tongan Americans constitute a small 0.02% of the U.S. population, with over 67,000 people recorded having Tongan ancestry in the country as of 2020. Much of the U.S. Tongan community resides in California. In San Mateo County (0.7% of the county's population) in the San Francisco Bay Area, there are over 5,000 Tongan Americans, mainly concentrated in Daly City, East Palo Alto, San Mateo, and San Bruno. There is a Tongan community in Oakland, of about 1,500 people (0.3% of Oakland's population). There is a Tongan population in Los Angeles County, mainly in Inglewood (0.7% of the city's population), Hawthorne, and Long Beach. There are also around 1,000 Tongans in Sacramento and more throughout the Sacramento Valley. There is a sizable Tongan community in Utah, mainly in the Salt Lake Valley. Salt Lake County has over 8,000 residents of Tongan ancestry. The Glendale neighborhood of Salt Lake City has one of the highest concentrations of Tongans in the area. Euless, Texas, in the Dallas-Fort Worth area, has a significant Tongan community, with more than 1,000 residents. Portland, Oregon has 500 Tongan individuals, with its metropolitan area having several hundred more in addition.
