= Tongans =

Indigenous Polynesian people of Tonga

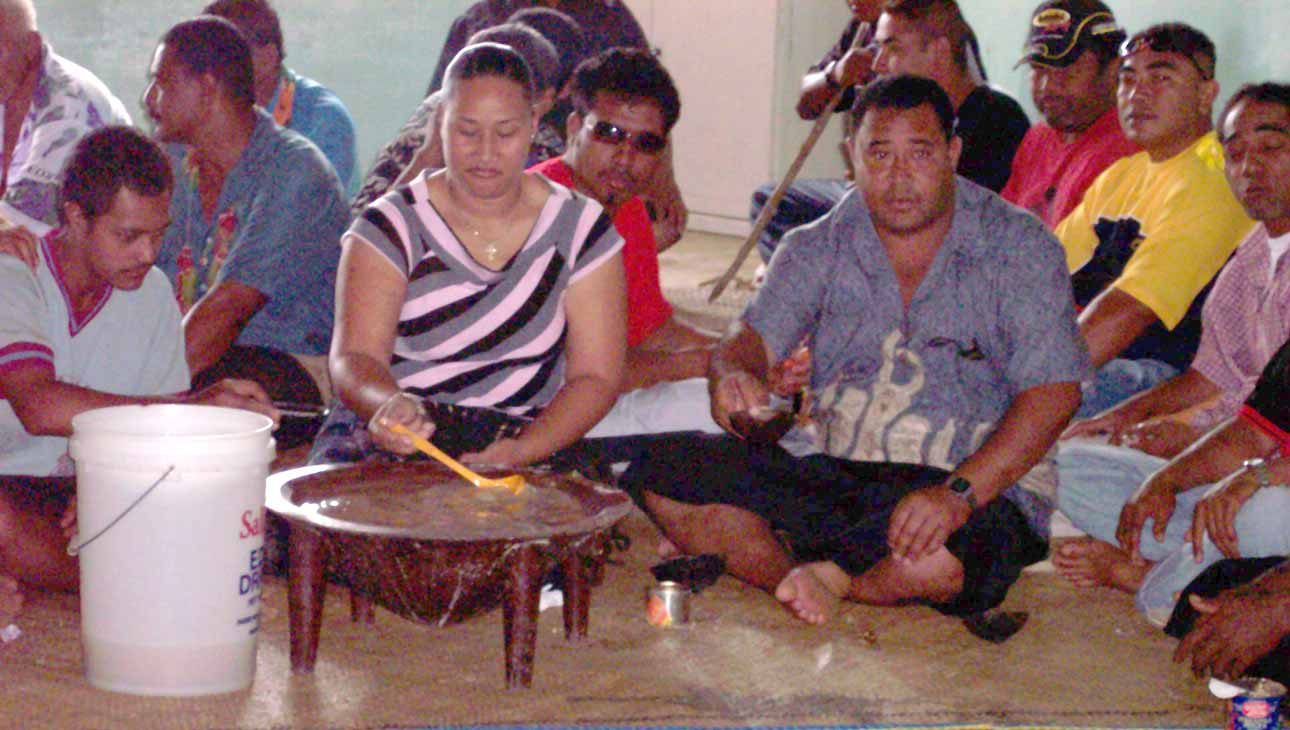
- Tongans gathered for a kava ceremony

Total population
- c. 305,000

Regions with significant populations
- Tonga: 100,210
- New Zealand: 97,824
- United States: 78,871
- Australia: 43,465
- Japan: 187 (December 2023)
- Canada: 120
- Italy: 50
- Brazil: 16
- Taiwan: 5

Languages
- Tongan, English

Religion
- Methodism, Catholicism, Mormonism

Related ethnic groups
- Other Polynesians, Tongan New Zealanders, Tongan Americans, Tongan Australians

Tongans or Tongan people are a Polynesian ethnic group native to Tonga, a Polynesian archipelago in the Pacific Ocean.

Tongans represent more than 98% of the inhabitants of Tonga. The rest are European (the majority are British), mixed European, and other Pacific Islanders. There also are several hundred Chinese. Almost two-thirds of the population live on its main island, Tongatapu. Although an increasing number of Tongans have moved into the only urban and commercial center, Nukuʻalofa, where European and Indigenous cultural and living patterns have blended, village life and kinship ties continue to be important throughout the country. Everyday life is heavily influenced by Polynesian traditions and especially by the Christian faith; for example, all commerce and entertainment activities cease from midnight Saturday until midnight Sunday, and the constitution declares the Sabbath to be sacred, forever. Important Christian denominations include Methodists (Free Wesleyan), Catholics, and Latter-day Saints.

== Language ==
Tongan is the official language, along with English. Tongan is a Polynesian language of the Tongic branch so is closely related to other languages of the Tongic branch, those being: Niuean, Uvean, Futunan, Samoan and Tokelauan. Tongan is more distantly related to other Polynesian languages such as Cook Islands Māori, Hawaiian, New Zealand Māori, and Tahitian, among others.

== See also ==
- Demographics of Tonga
