= Chinese people in Fiji =

Chinese Fijian
Total population
- 7,500 (~1.2% of Fijian population)

Regions with significant populations
- Suva

Languages
- Fijian, English, Cantonese, Shanghainese

Religion
- Buddhist, Chinese folk religion, Taoism, Confucianism, Christianity

Related ethnic groups
- Chinese Australians, Chinese New Zealanders, Chinese in Samoa, Chinese in Tonga

The Chinese diaspora in Fiji is a small but influential community in the multiracial society that makes up modern-day Fiji. In the early 2000s their numbers were estimated at around 6,000, or a little over half of one percent of Fiji's population. The most recent estimation puts the population at 7,500 making the concentration of Chinese in Fiji at around one percent. Around 80% of Chinese in Fiji speak Cantonese and around 16% speak Shanghainese as their native language. Chinese in Fiji also speak the local Fijian language. There are also a considerable number of Fijians who are of partial Chinese extraction, being descended from marriages between Chinese and indigenous Fijians.

For electoral purposes, Chinese people used to be counted as General Electors, an omnibus category for Fijian citizens not of indigenous, Indian, or Rotuman descent, who were allocated three seats in the 71-member House of Representatives. This classification became redundant with the 2013 Constitution, which abolished ethnic representation in Parliament.

== History ==
=== 19th century ===
The first Chinese people in Fiji arrived in the early 19th century, when two Chinese men named Luis and Saoo survived the shipwreck of the Eliza on the Mocea Reef in 1808. They lived in Bau until 1813, when they went to meet the transportation ship Hunter which was heading to China. They arrived at the Black Rock in Bua along with several other men who were meant to board the ship, among them Charles Savage. While the men were cautioned to stay on the island, Luis, Charles and others went onto land and were ambushed and killed by the Wailea people. Saoo's fate is unknown, but it has been speculated that he most likely went back to China on the Hunter.

No Chinese arrived in Fiji for several decades after Luis and Saoo. The next small group arrived in 1852, as claimed by elderly Chinese living in Fiji and substantiated by the Vice Consul for China, Van Chi Tsiang, in 1946. Groups of Chinese immigrants arrived in small numbers in the late 1800's, mostly originating from the Guangdong province. They set up small businesses and became quite successful. Within the study of Chinese migration, the earliest traders and merchants who sent money back home to their families and had the intention to return, are known as huashang. Huaqiao or sojourners were similar to huashang, traders with a deep connection to the Chinese culture and motherland. The assimilation of the Chinese immigrants with the existing population was difficult. As Bessie Ng Kumlin Ali puts it, "The desire to return to China from wherever they settled, whether it was California, Australasia or Fiji, to a large extent determined their way of life." The social and cultural lives of the Chinese in Fiji were often limited to their countrymen. As the Chinese intended to return, their main motivation was earning enough money to do so comfortably. As such, they worked long and hard hours, with limited time for social engagements. The language barrier made interacting with the native Fijians difficult, and the fact that the early immigrants were only men increased suspicion and prejudice. The most well-known early Chinese settlers in Fiji were Moy Park Ling Houng Lee, who built a successful business empire, and Ming Ting, the first Chinese Suva municipal councillor. Moy Park Ling raised his family on Fiji and was financially successful, but still returned to China later in life. This diasporic relationship meant that "they could not and would not be fully accepted by their host country, with their consciousness and solidarity as a group being defined by this continuing relationship with the homeland."

=== 20th century ===
Chinese people were enfranchised for the first time in 1964. The former European roll was redefined to include other minority groups and renamed the General Electors roll. Despite being only a splinter of the electorate, General Electors were then allocated 10 of the 36 seats in the Legislative Council, as the legislature was then known, though this figure has gradually been reduced since independence in 1970.

Around a thousand Chinese settled in Fiji in the late 1980s and early 1990s, and in February 1995, the Fijian Cabinet approved a plan to allow up to 7000 Hong Kong Chinese to immigrate to Fiji. Conditions included payment of F$30,000 to the government, and investment of F$100,000 in government-approved projects. Many of these invested in restaurants, retailing, and market gardening (mostly in Kalabu, Tamavua, Delaivalelevu, Vikoba, Sawani and Waibau), and have intensified horticulture around Suva. A further wave of Chinese has arrived since the late 1990s, many of them from the northern part of China. Many of the more recent immigrants have opened bakeries and other food outlets in Fijian villages, creating employment for local people, says Fiji Times editor Samisoni Kakaivalu.

The exact date of Moy Ba Ling's arrival is not known, but on 17 September 2005, the Chinese community celebrated the 150th anniversary.

=== Controversies ===
A 357-kilogram heroin bust in 2000 and a Suva drug laboratory, with a value estimated at close to F$1 billion, in 2004, raised public concerns about the activities of some of the more recent Chinese immigrants. The activities of a few of them, says Fiji Law Society President Graeme Leung, have unfairly stigmatized the Chinese community in the eyes of the public.

On 4 October 2005, Military spokesman Lieutenant Colonel Orisi Rabukawaqa said that the Army had uncovered an immigration scam. Almost seven thousand Chinese nationals, he claimed, had entered Fiji illegally since 2003. He alleged that bribery in the office of the Registrar General had resulted in massive falsification of documents, with Chinese immigrants being falsely identified as ethnic Fijians. Military investigations showed that illegal immigration was related to increasing rates of prostitution, gambling, money laundering, and illegal fishing.

On 6 October, Justice Ministry Chief Executive Sakiusa Rabuka challenged the Military to substantiate its allegations, telling the Fiji Village news service on 9 October that the allegations made by the Military were "baseless." Only one case had been found, he said, of an Asian national trying to change his birth certificate.

As more evidence came to light, however, the local Chinese community called for a crackdown on corruption in the immigration service. Government-appointed Senator Kenneth Low, who was also President of the Chinese Business Association in Fiji, alleged on 8 November that corrupt immigration officials were granting Fijian citizenship to illegal Asian immigrants for money and sex, and called on the government to establish a commission of inquiry into illegal immigration.

Dixon Seeto spoke out on 15 December against violent attacks made against Chinese market gardeners and farmers. Both men and women were being assaulted by youths seeking cash, he claimed, when bringing their produce to the market at around 3 or 4 a.m. He called for more police patrols to prevent such attacks.

== Prominence ==
Well-known persons of whole or partial Chinese descent include former Cabinet Minister Pio Wong, former Senators Kenneth Low and James Ah Koy, Peter Lee (former long serving General Manager of Coca-Cola Fiji and currently heading Fiji's largest conglomerate - Carpenters) and prominent lawyer Graeme Leung. At the 150th anniversary celebrations, Fiji's Vice-President, Ratu Joni Madraiwiwi, paid tribute to the contribution the Chinese community has made to Fiji. "The Chinese community has never been a large one but their influence has been felt far beyond their numbers," he said.
