= List of ambassadors of Samoa to China =

Coordinates: 39.945493°N 116.451241°E

Ambassador of Samoa to China
- Incumbent; Luamanuvae Albert Mariner since February 1, 2022
- Inaugural holder: Tapusalaia Terry Toʻomata
- Formation: August 28, 2009

The Samoan ambassador in Beijing is the official representative of the Government in Apia to the Government of the People's Republic of China.

== List of representatives ==
Diplomatic agrément/Diplomatic accreditation	Ambassador	Observations	Prime Minister of Samoa	Premier of the People's Republic of China	Term end
November 6, 1975		The Governments in Apia y Beijing established diplomatic relations.	Tupua Tamasese Lealofi IV	Zhou Enlai	
August 28, 2009	Tapusalaia Terry Toʻomata		Tuilaepa Aiono Sailele Malielegaoi	Wen Jiabao	February 1, 2022
February 1, 2022	Luamanuvae Albert Mariner				

== See also ==
- China–Samoa relations
