= China–Fiji relations =

- China: Fiji

Diplomatic mission
- Chinese Embassy, Suva: Fijian Embassy, Beijing

Envoy
- Chinese Ambassador Quan Bo: Fijian Ambassador Ioane Naivalurua

The Republic of the Fiji Islands was the first Pacific Island country to establish diplomatic relations with the People's Republic of China, in 1975. China established an embassy in Fiji in 1976, and Fiji opened its embassy in China in 2001.

China-Fijian diplomatic and economic relations significantly increased in the first decade of the 21st century.

== Context ==
Oceania is, to the People's Republic of China and the Republic of China (Taiwan), a stage for continuous diplomatic competition. Ten states in Oceania recognise the PRC, and four recognise the ROC. These numbers fluctuate as Pacific Island nations re-evaluate their foreign policies, and occasionally shift diplomatic recognition between Beijing and Taipei. In keeping with the "One China Policy", it is not possible for any country to maintain official diplomatic relations with "both Chinas", and this "either/or" factor has resulted in the PRC and the ROC actively courting diplomatic favours from small Pacific nations. In 2003, the People's Republic of China announced it intended to enhance its diplomatic ties with the Pacific Islands Forum, and increase the economic aid package it provided to that organisation. At the same time, PRC delegate Zhou Whenzhong added: "[T]he PIF should refrain from any exchanges of an official nature or dialogue partnership of any form with Taiwan". In 2006, Chinese Premier Wen Jiabao announced that the PRC would increase its economic cooperation with Pacific Island States. The PRC would provide more economic aid, abolish tariffs for exports from the Pacific's least developed countries, annul the debt of those countries, distribute free anti-malaria medicines, and provide training for two thousand Pacific Islander government officials and technical staff. Also in 2006, Wen became the first Chinese premier to visit the Pacific islands, which the Taipei Times described as "a longtime diplomatic battleground for China and Taiwan". Similarly, according to Ron Crocombe, Professor of Pacific Studies at the University of the South Pacific, "There have been more Pacific Islands minister visits to China than to any other country".

== Scope ==
=== Economic relations ===
When relations were first established, Fiji had no exports to China, and the volume of Chinese exports to Fiji amounted to just €1.6 million. In 2002, Chinese exports –consisting mainly in textiles, light industrial products and mechanical and electrical products– amounted to €21 million, while its imports from Fiji –mainly raw sugar, saw log and synthetics– amounted to €0.97 million.

The two countries signed an agreement on trade cooperation in 1997, and an agreement on economic and technical cooperation in 2001.

Fiji joined the Belt and Road Initiative (BRI) in 2018.

=== Military relations ===
Several research and spaceflight support vessels of the Yuan Wang class, including the Yuan Wang 5 and the Yuan Wang 7, have used Kings Wharf at Suva to resupply. Chinese Ambassador Qian Bo has denied Australian media reports that the Yuan Wang 7 was used to spy on HMAS Adelaide while docked at Suva.

=== Culture and education ===
A small number of Fiji students study in China, some with a scholarship provided by the Chinese government.

Fiji has also welcomed cultural performances from China – including a number of “martial art and acrobatic troupes”. Since 2001, Fiji Television relays programmes from China Central Television.

=== Top level visits ===
The countries’ leaders have visited one another regularly. Not counting stopover visits, top ranking Chinese government visitors to Fiji have included Vice Premier Chen Muhua in 1979, Hu Yaobang (General Secretary of the Chinese Communist Party) in 1985, Premier Li Peng in 1992, Vice Premier and Foreign Minister Qian Qichen in 1996, Chi Haotian (Vice Chairman of the Central Military Committee) in 1998, and Wu Yi (Minister of Foreign Economic Cooperation and Trade) in 1998.

Top ranking Fiji government leaders to China have included Prime Minister Ratu Sir Kamisese Mara in 1979, 1985, 1988 and 1990, Governor-General Ratu Sir Penaia Ganilau in 1980, Foreign Minister Filipe Bole in 1987, Commander of the Fijian Armed Forces Sitiveni Rabuka in 1990, President Ratu Sir Penaia Ganilau in 1991, Commander of the Fijian Armed Forces Epeli Ganilau in 1992 and 1997, Prime Minister Sitiveni Rabuka in 1994, Minister of Foreign Affairs and Trade Berenado Vunibobo in 1997, Prime Minister Mahendra Chaudry in 1999, Minister of Foreign Affairs, Trade and Sugar Kaliopate Tavola in 2001 and 2002, and Prime Minister Laisenia Qarase in 2002.

== Current relations ==
Fiji's foreign policy under Prime Minister Laisenia Qarase (2000–2006) was (in the latter's own words) to "look north" - i.e., strengthen its relations with Asia in general and China in particular. Qarase stated: "We look now for new markets, where there is flexibility of entry and a readiness to meet the export needs of small, isolated island countries. This is what we would like to engage on with China as we increasingly look north for the answers to our trade and investment aspirations."

Following the military coup in Fiji in December 2006, the PRC distanced itself from the Western nations which condemned the overthrow of Qarase's government. Chinese Ministry of Foreign Affairs deputy director general Deng Hongbo stated:

"We have always respected Fiji's status as an independent nation and we have called on the other countries to do the same and reconsider their attitudes towards Fiji and the current situation in the country."

The post-coup "interim government" led by Commodore Frank Bainimarama has continued Qarase's "look north" policy. In July 2007, Finance Minister Mahendra Chaudhry responded to the contrast between Western criticism and Chinese support for Bainimarama's government:

“Fiji has friends in China, it has friends in Korea, it has friends in […] other Asian countries. We’re no longer relying on Australia and New Zealand. And in any event, the United States was not doing much for Fiji anyway.”

Later that year, a China/Fiji Trade and Economic Commission was set up to enhance economic relations between the two countries. The PRC has maintained a position of support, calling on other countries to show "understanding" for Fiji's situation. And although Fiji has no diplomatic relations with Taiwan, the latter's Trade Mission representative in Fiji, Victor Chin, has also called on the international community not to pressure Fiji: “I think we should give the interim government the benefit of the doubt. They committed to have an election when everything is ready. I think we should take their words [sic] for it.”

In March 2008, following unrest in Tibet, Fiji expressed its support for China's actions in dealing with rioting in Lhasa. Shortly thereafter, police in Fiji arrested seventeen people who were protesting in support of Tibet outside China's embassy in Suva. Those arrested were "mainly women who had gathered peacefully", according to a Radio New Zealand International correspondent, and included human rights activist Shamima Ali.

A May 2008 article in the Sydney Morning Herald stated that "China's aid to Fiji has skyrocketed since the coup in December 2006", from €650,000 to over €100,000,000. The author of the article commented: "Just as Australia and other Western donors are trying to squeeze [Fiji's] rebel Government, China has dramatically stepped up its aid, effectively dissipating any pressure Western donors might have been generating." The author suggested that China did not wish to risk antagonising Fiji and thus unwittingly push the Bainimarama government towards seeking aid from Taiwan: "China clearly finds itself boxed into a corner. On the one hand, Western states are asking it to help isolate the new dictatorship in Fiji. On the other, China faces the risk of losing a Fiji starved of funds to its renegade province, Taiwan."

In August 2008, while on a visit to China, Commodore Bainimarama spoke of the "very close and cordial relations that our two countries share in our trade, cultural and sporting linkages", and added:

"Fiji will not forget that when other countries were quick to condemn us following the events of 1987, 2000 and 2006, China and other friends in Asia demonstrated a more understanding and sensitive approach to events in Fiji. The Government of the People’s Republic of China expressed confidence in our ability to resolve our problems in our way, without undue pressure of interference."

In February 2009, at a time when Fiji was facing pressure from the Pacific Islands Forum over its apparent lack of progress towards a restoration of democracy, Chinese Vice-President Xi Jinping paid a state visit to Fiji and met Prime Minister Bainimarama. On that occasion, Xi stated that he wished to "further enhance [China-Fiji] exchanges and cooperation in such fields as culture, education, public health and tourism". Xinhua reported that, during Xi's visit, China and Fiji had "signed a number of cooperative deals" by which China would provide Fiji with "economic and technical assistance". China committed itself to increasing its imports from Fiji. Bainimarama, for his part, re-affirmed his country's recognition of the One China policy, and, as reported by Fiji Village, "thanked the Chinese government for fully recognizing Fiji's sovereignty and adopting a policy of non-interference in its domestic affairs".

In May, Bainimarama told Australian reporter Graham Davis that, unlike Australia and New Zealand, the Chinese authorities were "very sympathetic and understand what’s happening here, that we need to do things in our own way". Also in May, Vice-President of Fiji Ratu Epeli Nailatikau described Fiji's "relationship with the government and the people of the People's Republic of China as one of its most important".

In June 2009, the Fiji Democracy and Freedom Movement, an organisation founded in Australia to campaign for the restoration of democracy in Fiji, sent a petition to the Chinese embassy in Canberra, asking China to "withdraw support for the military regime". At the same time, Australian Foreign Minister Stephen Smith asked China "not to use [its] contacts with Fiji to undermine efforts to pressure Fiji to hold elections".

In February 2010, when Fiji's human rights record was examined by the Human Rights Council's Universal Periodic Review, and several countries highlighted what they described as human rights violations under Commodore Bainimarama's administration, the Chinese delegation intervened to "commend the Fiji government for the efforts it has made in the promotion and protection of human rights".

In 2024, the Organized Crime and Corruption Reporting Project (OCCRP) and The Age reported on connections between Chinese organized crime figures and the Chinese Communist Party's political influence operations in Fiji.

In 2024, China and the Fiji signed a memorandum of understanding which incorporated blue economy cooperation.

In June 2025, Fiji's prime minister Sitiveni Rabuka stated that a Chinese military base in Fiji is not welcome and that China must respect Fiji's territorial waters.

== Stance towards Taiwan ==
In 1997, Fiji opened its Fiji Trade and Tourism Representative Office in Taipei in Taiwan. Taiwan operates the Trade Mission of the Republic of China to the Republic of Fiji.

Taiwan provides continuous free medical assistance to Fiji. A Taiwanese medical team visits the country on an annual basis to offer its services in hospitals and clinics. The Fiji government has expressed its gratitude for the help.

In 2005, Taiwanese President Chen Shui-bian visited Fiji, where he was greeted by government delegates with "full traditional Fijian ceremony of welcome" - although he did not meet his counterpart President Ratu Josefa Iloilovatu Uluivuda, nor Prime Minister Laisenia Qarase. Ambassador Cai expressed China's "disappointment" at Fiji for having authorised the visit. Later that year, relations were slightly strained once more when Fiji supported Taiwan's wish to join the World Health Organization. Nonetheless, Qarase's government did not vary from its official recognition of the "One China" policy.

On 10 May 2017, Fiji closed its Fiji Trade and Tourism Representative Office in Taipei in Taiwan. Taiwan, however, still operates its trade mission to Fiji.

On October 8 2020, Chinese embassy officials gatecrashed and then attacked Taiwanese officials as they were holding the ROC National Day celebration with Fijian officials. One of the Taiwan officials who was assaulted needed to be taken into hospital. One of the Chinese officials was also injured. In the aftermath of this assault, Fiji says it will start protecting Taiwanese officials.

== See also ==
- Foreign relations of China#Fiji
- Sino-Pacific relations#Fiji
