= Checkbook diplomacy =

Type of foreign policy

Checkbook diplomacy or chequebook diplomacy, is used to describe a foreign policy which openly uses economic aid and investment between countries to achieve diplomatic favor.

== Abkhazia and South Ossetia ==
More recently, the term has been introduced as pertaining to the diplomatic recognition of the breakaway South Caucasus states of Abkhazia or South Ossetia by a short list of Pacific island nations. Nauru recognized both nations in exchange for US$50 million in aid from Russia. Tuvalu recognized Abkhazia and South Ossetia as well, after a freshwater shipment from Abkhazia and what is believed to have been an offer of aid from Russia. Vanuatu recognized Abkhazia (but not South Ossetia) after a suspected amount of Russian aid equivalent to that given to Nauru. Tuvalu and Vanuatu have since withdrawn their respective recognitions and reestablished relations with Georgia. Nauru is the only Pacific island state that currently has diplomatic relations with at least one of either Abkhazia or South Ossetia.

== People's Republic of China / Republic of China ==
In East Asia, the term has often been used to describe the competition between the People's Republic of China (on Mainland China) and the Republic of China (in Taiwan Area) to gain "recognition" with entities around the world, notably in the Pacific.

== Others ==
The term has been used to describe German and Japanese international involvement during and after the Gulf War. Neither country was able to commit troops to the coalition due to restrictions placed into their constitutions when they were drawn up under Allied occupation following World War II (see Article 9 of the Japanese Constitution and Art. 87a of the Basic Law for the Federal Republic of Germany). Instead they volunteered large amounts of financing for the war effort. However, Germany was also providing additional NATO navy units in other regions.

== See also ==
- Debt-trap diplomacy
- Dollar diplomacy
