= China–Tonga relations =

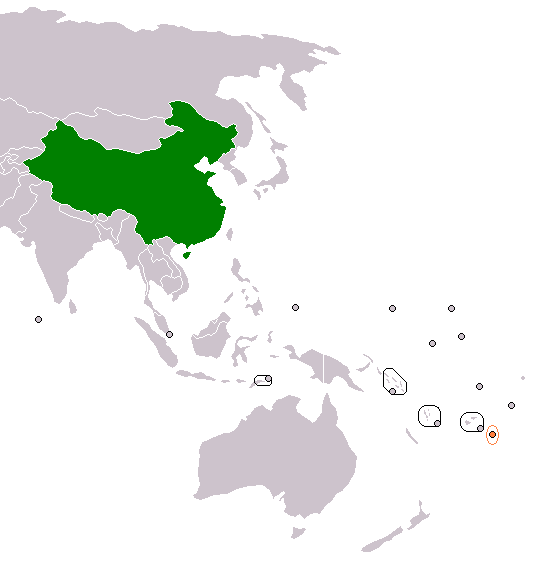

- China: Tonga

Tonga and China (PRC) established official diplomatic relations in 1998. The two countries maintain cordial diplomatic, economic, and military relations.

== Context ==
Oceania is, to the People's Republic of China and the Republic of China (Taiwan), a stage for continuous diplomatic competition. Eight states in Oceania recognise the PRC, and six recognise the ROC. These numbers fluctuate as Pacific Island nations re-evaluate their foreign policies, and occasionally shift diplomatic recognition between Beijing and Taipei. In keeping with the "One China" policy, it is not possible for any country to maintain official diplomatic relations with "both Chinas", and this "either/or" factor has resulted in the PRC and the ROC actively courting diplomatic favours from small Pacific nations. In 2003, the People's Republic of China announced it intended to enhance its diplomatic ties with the Pacific Islands Forum, and increase the economic aid package it provided to that organisation. At the same time, PRC delegate Zhou Whenzhong added: "[T]he PIF should refrain from any exchanges of an official nature or dialogue partnership of any form with Taiwan". In 2006, Chinese Premier Wen Jiabao announced that the PRC would increase its economic cooperation with Pacific Island States. The PRC would provide more economic aid, abolish tariffs for exports from the Pacific's least developed countries, annul the debt of those countries, distribute free anti-malaria medicines, and provide training for two thousand Pacific Islander government officials and technical staff. Also in 2006, Wen became the first Chinese premier to visit the Pacific islands, which the Taipei Times described as "a longtime diplomatic battleground for China and Taiwan". Similarly, according to Ron Crocombe, Professor of Pacific Studies at the University of the South Pacific, "There have been more Pacific Islands minister visits to China than to any other country."

== Situation of Chinese Tongans ==
There were approximately three or four thousand Chinese people living in Tonga in 2001, thus comprising 3 or 4% of the total Tongan population. Chinese Tongans are Tonga's main ethnic minority group, and have been subjected to significant levels of racism, including racist violence, since the late 1990s.

In 2000, noble Tu’ivakano of Nukunuku banned all Chinese stores from his Nukunuku District. This followed alleged complaints from other shopkeepers regarding competition from local Chinese. In 2001, Tonga's Chinese community was hit by a wave of roughly a hundred racist assaults. The Tongan government decided not to renew the work permits of over 600 Chinese storekeepers, and admitted the decision was in response to “widespread anger at the growing presence of the storekeepers."

In 2006, rioters caused severe damage to shops owned by Chinese-Tongans in Nukuʻalofa. The Chinese Ministry of Foreign Affairs dispatched a working group to Nuku'alofa and ultimately evacuated almost two hundred vulnerable Chinese nationals.

These events have had no noticeable negative impact on Sino-Tongan relations; in response to continued Chinese development assistance in 2011, Tongan Deputy Prime Minister Samiu Vaipulu spoke of the "warm relations between [our] two countries."

== Current relations ==
Tonga has consistently recognised the People's Republic of China since 1998.

In 2001, Tonga and the PRC announced their decision to strengthen their "military relations". In 2008, the PRC provided Tonga with military supplies worth over €340,000.

In the wake of riots in Nuku'alofa in 2006, China's Export-Import Bank gave Tonga a $118m loan at an interest rate of only 2% with payments now deferred until 2018. Much of it was used for construction, and paid to Chinese construction companies.

In April 2008, Tongan King George Tupou V visited China, reaffirmed his country's adherence to the "One China" policy, and, according to the Chinese State news agency Xinhua, "supported the measures adopted to handle the incident in Lhasa". King Tupou V also met Chinese Defense Minister Liang Guanglie to "enhance exchange and cooperation between the two militaries". Xinhua stated that China and Tonga have "fruitful cooperation in politics, economy, trade, agriculture, and education, and kept a sound coordination in regional and international affairs".

In June 2009, Radio Australia reported that it had "obtained a document" sent from the Chinese embassy in Tonga to the Tongan Ministry of Foreign Affairs. The embassy expressed concern about two Falun Gong members who were visiting Tonga to express their beliefs to Tongans. The Chinese authorities described them as "anti-China", and asked Tonga to take "immediate and appropriate actions" regarding a situation which might harm Sino-Tongan friendly relations. In another document that Radio Australia said it had obtained, Tonga's Secretary for Foreign Affairs instructed police and defence officials to help preserve "Tonga's good relations with China". Radio Australia reported that the two women had allegedly been questioned by Tongan immigration officials as a result of the Chinese embassy's request.

In 2013, China gave a 60-seat Xian MA-60 airplane to Tonga's airline Real Tonga. This caused some tension between Tonga and New Zealand, because tourism dropped after the New Zealand airline Air Chathams pulled out of Tonga in order not to face subsidized competition and the New Zealand government posted a travel advisory about the safety of MA-60 airplanes.

Tonga joined the Belt and Road Initiative (BRI) in 2018.

In July 2020, Tonga asked China to restructure its debts. During the 2020 Summer Olympics, the Chinese government provided some Tongans with all expenses-paid training in China. As of 2024, Tonga owes Beijing more than US$120 million, a sum roughly equivalent to a quarter of its annual GDP. Tonga has requested debt relief from the PRC but has been refused. Tonga's current repayment plan is in part contingent on an additional A$30 million support from Australia.

In 2022, China and the Tonga signed a memorandum of understanding which incorporated blue economy cooperation.
