= China–Vanuatu relations =

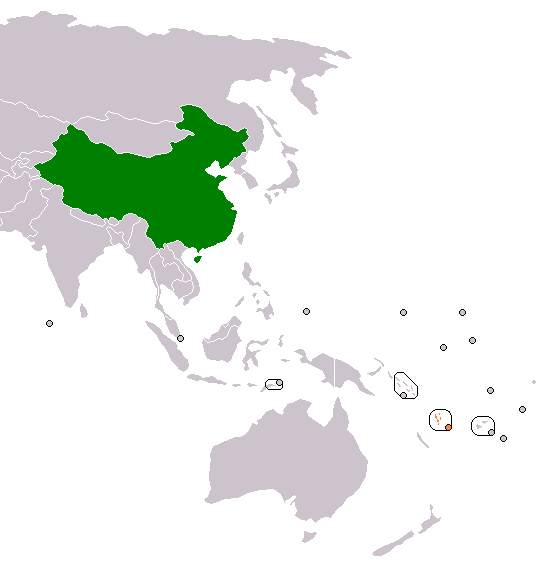

- China: Vanuatu

The Republic of Vanuatu and the People's Republic of China (PRC) established official diplomatic relations on March 26, 1982. China established an embassy in Vanuatu in 1989, while Vanuatu established an honorary consulate in China in 1999; it officially became an embassy in 2005. The current Ambassador of China in Vanuatu is Liu Quan. The current Ambassador of Vanuatu in China is former Minister of Finance Willie Jimmy.

In June 2009, Vanuatu's ambassador to China, Willie Jimmy, "call[ed] [...] for China to have a foot firmly planted in the Pacific through Port Vila", a comment which -the Vanuatu Daily Post remarked- "no doubt caused ruffled feathers among other foreign diplomatic partners".

== History ==
Oceania is, to the People's Republic of China and the Republic of China (Taiwan), a stage for continuous diplomatic competition. Eight states in Oceania recognise the PRC, and six recognise the ROC. These numbers fluctuate as Pacific Island nations re-evaluate their foreign policies, and occasionally shift diplomatic recognition between Beijing and Taipei. In keeping with the "One China" policy, it is not possible for any country to maintain official diplomatic relations with "both Chinas", and this "either/or" factor has resulted in the PRC and the ROC actively courting diplomatic favours from small Pacific nations. In 2003, the People's Republic of China announced it intended to enhance its diplomatic ties with the Pacific Islands Forum, and increase the economic aid package it provided to that organisation. At the same time, PRC delegate Zhou Whenzhong added: "[T]he PIF should refrain from any exchanges of an official nature or dialogue partnership of any form with Taiwan". In 2006, Chinese Premier Wen Jiabao announced that the PRC would increase its economic cooperation with Pacific Island States. The PRC would provide more economic aid, abolish tariffs for exports from the Pacific's least developed countries, annul the debt of those countries, distribute free anti-malaria medicines, and provide training for two thousand Pacific Islander government officials and technical staff. Also in 2006, Wen became the first Chinese premier to visit the Pacific islands, which the Taipei Times described as "a longtime diplomatic battleground for China and Taiwan". Similarly, according to Ron Crocombe, Professor of Pacific Studies at the University of the South Pacific, "There have been more Pacific Islands minister visits to China than to any other country".

=== Economic relations ===
In 2006, Vanuatu signed an economic cooperation agreement with the PRC, whereby the latter was to assist Vanuatu's economic development and remove tariffs on imports from Vanuatu. The PRC also added Vanuatu to its list of approved tourism destinations for Chinese tourists. Vanuatuan trade minister James Bule said his country had also requested China's assistance "in supplying machines so we can establish a plant in Vanuatu to produce bio fuel".

In 2002, the countries' bilateral trade was worth €1.294 million, of which just over €1 million imported by Vanuatu from China, and over €200,000 imported by China from Vanuatu. Vanuatu imports Chinese garments, shoes, textiles, medicines, foods and light industrial products, while China imports Vanuatuan "plants to be used for killing insects and bacteria, as well as buttons and sown timber".

According to the government of Vanuatu, "China is recognized as one of Vanuatu's major development partners".

As of 2018, China reportedly accounts for approximately $220 million of Vanuatu's foreign debts.

Vanuatu joined the Belt and Road Initiative (BRI) in 2018.

=== Military relations ===
According to reporting by Fairfax Media, China and Vanuatu are in negotiations to allow China to open a permanent military base on Vanuatu. China is funding the construction of a new wharf on Espiritu Santo, which Australian government officials believe could be used to host naval vessels. The Chinese Ministry of Foreign Affairs and Vanuatu Foreign Minister Ralph Regenvanu both rebuffed the reporting.

In 2017, China donated fourteen military vehicles to Vanuatu.

=== Relations in culture and education ===
In July 2002, the Hebei Acrobatic Troupe performed in Vanuatu, followed by the Chinese Acrobatic and Folk Orchestra Troupe in June 2007.

Since 2005, the Chinese Central Television has been broadcasting in Vanuatu. Chinese Radio International has been available to Vanuatuan listeners since 2007.

In terms of education, since 1995, China has provided quotas of scholarships for Vanuatuan students to study in China; nine Vanuatuan students were provided with scholarships in the 2007/08 university year. As of 2008, there were two Chinese language teachers, sent by China, in Vanuatu.

=== Recent developments ===
In July 2019, six Chinese nationals, some with Vanuatuan passports, were deported from Vanuatu to China on accusations of internet scamming. The incident drew condemnation from abroad as the individuals were not given the chance to appear before a court and were held for days without charge. In November 2019, expatriate Dan McGarry, who is the media director of the Daily Post newspaper in Vanuatu, was not allowed to return to the country after Prime Minister Charlot Salwai accused him of negatively reporting the country's ties with China.

In July 2024, Minister Charlot Salwai graced the opening ceremony of the new $21 million Presidential palace built by China. Hu Chunhua bestowed Vanatu an oversized novelty golden key emblazoned with "China Aid". Dragon dancers and ceremonial kava brew completed the festivity.

In June 2026, Vanuatu signed a defense and economic agreement, the Nakamal Agreement, with Australia that prevents the creation of any Chinese military bases in Vanuatu.

== Relationship with Taiwan ==
From 1982 to 2004, Vanuatu consistently recognised the People's Republic of China. In November 2004, Prime Minister Serge Vohor briefly established diplomatic relations with the Republic of China (Taiwan), before being ousted for that reason in a vote of no confidence the following month. Vanuatu has recognised the PRC ever since. Nonetheless, Vohor remained a critic of what he perceived as China's excessive influence on the Vanuatuan government.
