= New Zealand–Tonga relations =

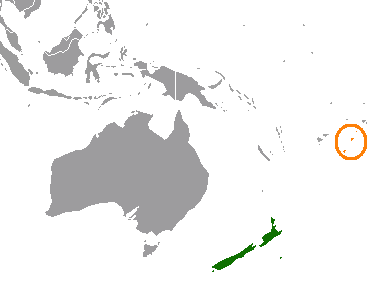

- New Zealand: Tonga

New Zealand–Tonga relations refers to the diplomatic relations between New Zealand and the Kingdom of Tonga. Both nations are members of the Commonwealth of Nations, Pacific Islands Forum and the United Nations.

== History ==
=== Pre-independence period ===
Both New Zealand and Tonga belong to the Polynesian Triangle and the native Māori people of New Zealand share genetic and cultural similarities with the people of Tonga. In the nineteenth century, contact between the two countries was renewed after the British colonization of New Zealand, starting from the 1840s when there was correspondence between King George Tupou I and New Zealand Governor George Grey; seeking advice on law and government. In 1918, a flu pandemic (also known as the Spanish flu) was brought to Tonga by a ship from New Zealand. The virus killed approximately 1,800 Tongans, reflecting a mortality rate of about eight percent.

During World War I, Tongan soldiers served in the Māori and Regular Battalions in the New Zealand Army. In 1947, with the Statute of Westminster Adoption Act, New Zealand in effect became an independent nation from the United Kingdom. In 1967, New Zealand Prime Minister Keith Holyoake visited Tonga for the coronation of Tongan King Tāufaʻāhau Tupou IV.

=== Contemporary relations, 1970–present ===
In June 1970, Tonga ceased to be a protected state by the United Kingdom. That same year, New Zealand and Tonga established diplomatic relations. Initially, New Zealand was accredited to Tonga from its high commission in Apia, Samoa. In 1974, New Zealand opened a resident high commission in Nuku'alofa. Since the establishment of diplomatic relations, bilateral relations between both nations have been steadily growing. In 2008, New Zealand Prime Minister Helen Clark attended the coronation of Tongan King George Tupou V. In 2009, Tonga opened its first high commission in Wellington, however, the high commission was closed in 2012 due to financial reasons. Tonga later opened a consulate-general in Auckland.

In March 2018, New Zealand Prime Minister Jacinda Ardern and Foreign Minister Winston Peters led a Pacific Mission to Tonga. While in Tonga the Prime Minister announced a $10 million recovery package for those affected by Cyclone Gita. In March 2019, Tongan King Tupou VI and Queen Nanasipauʻu Tukuʻaho visited New Zealand.

In 2020, New Zealand and Tonga celebrated 50 years of diplomatic relations.

In April 2025, New Zealand Foreign Minister Winston Peters led a delegation to Tonga and met with Tongan Prime Minister ‘Aisake Valu Eke and his cabinet to reaffirm bilateral relations particularly in the areas of maritime safety, agricultural research, defence and law enforcement. During the visit, Peters announced that New Zealand would grant multiple entry visas to visitors from Pacific Islands Forum countries including Tonga from July 2025. In addition, nationals from Forum countries on temporary Australian visas would be able to visit New Zealand for up to three months without requiring a visa.

In March 2026, New Zealand Prime Minister Christopher Luxon led a parliamentary delegation consisting of Minister for Pacific Peoples Shane Reti, Police Minister Mark Mitchell, Tim van de Molen, Jenny Salesa and Teanau Tuiono to Samoa and Tonga between 15 and 18 March to reaffirm bilateral relations with those countries. On 18 March, Luxon and Police Commissioner Richard Chambers visited the Tongan Police headquarters where they announced that New Zealand would fund Tonga and Samoa's subscription for the anti-drug Starboard marine surveillance platform; $2 million for social services to help reintegrate Tongan deportees returning from New Zealand; $2.4 million to the Salvation Army's charitable activities in Tonga, Samoa and Fiji; and two new kennels for drug detector dogs. Luxon also met with his Tongan counterpart Fatafehi Fakafānua and King Tupou VI.

== Migration and Transportation ==
There is approximately a community of 60,000 Tongans living in New Zealand. New Zealand has the largest community of Tongans outside of Tonga.

There are direct flights between both nations with Air New Zealand.

== Trade ==
New Zealand high commission in Nukuʻalofa

In 2023, trade between both nations totaled $66.77 million United States dollars. New Zealand's main exports to Tonga include: travel services, mechanical machinery, dairy products, wood and meat. Tonga's main exports to New Zealand include: travel services, vegetables, fruit and nuts.

== Resident diplomatic missions ==
- New Zealand has a high commission in Nukuʻalofa.
- Tonga has a consulate-general in Auckland.

== See also ==
- Tongan New Zealanders
