= China–Micronesia relations =

China–Federated States of Micronesia relations
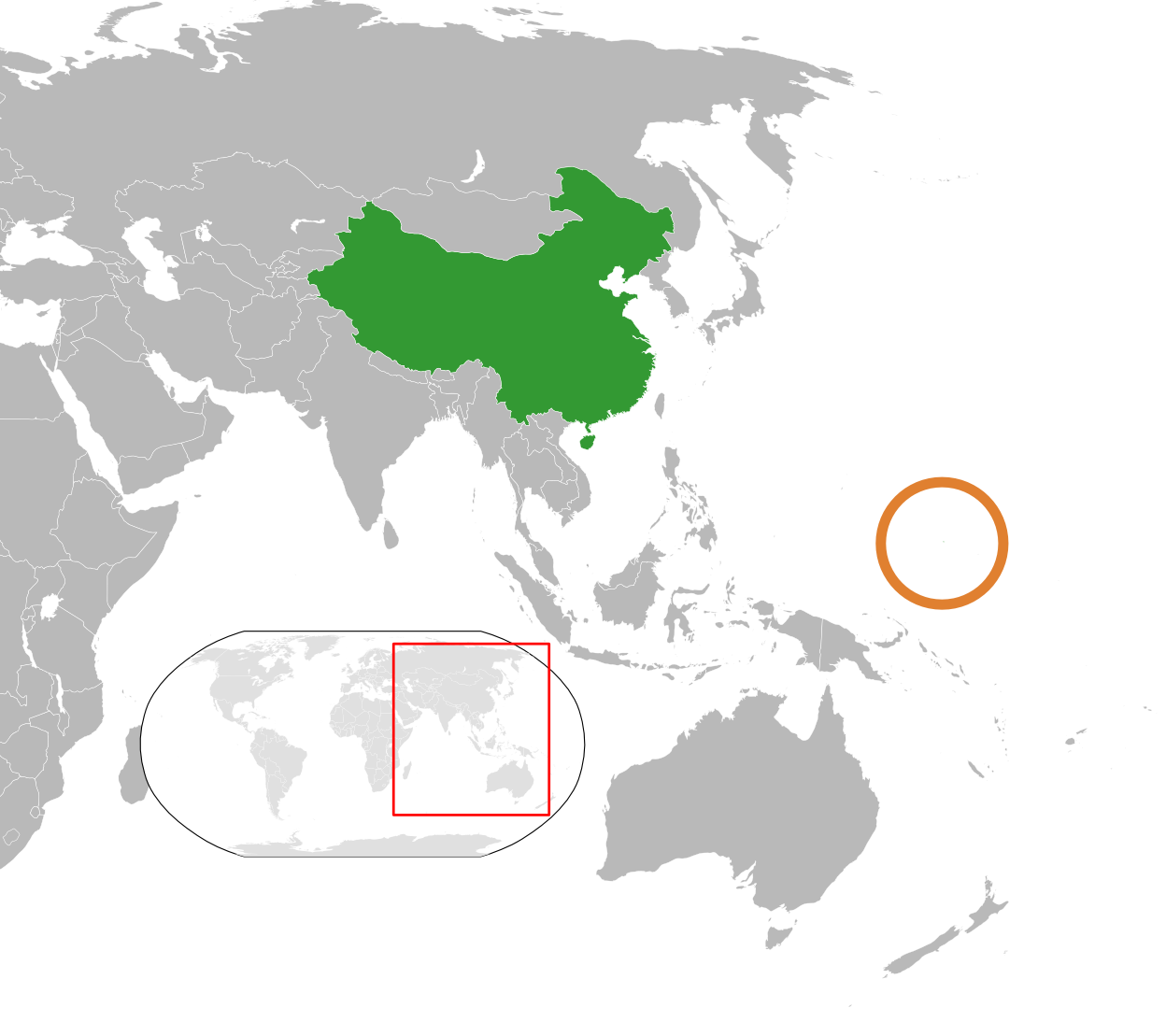

- China: Federated States of Micronesia

Diplomatic relations between China and the Federated States of Micronesia were established on September 11, 1989. The Chinese government first established an embassy in the capital of Palikir in 1990, and dispatched its first ambassador in 1991. Initially, the Micronesian ambassador to Tokyo, Japan also served as Micronesia's ambassador to China, before Micronesia established an embassy in Beijing in 2007. President John Haglelgam was the first senior government agent from Micronesia to visit China, doing so in 1990. The current Chinese ambassador to Micronesia is Zhang Weidong, while the Micronesian ambassador to Beijing is Akillino H. Susaia.

== Context ==
detailed article: Sino-Pacific relations

Oceania is, to the People's Republic of China and the Republic of China (Taiwan), a stage for continuous diplomatic competition. Eleven states in Oceania recognise the PRC, and three recognise the ROC. These numbers fluctuate as Pacific Island nations re-evaluate their foreign policies, and occasionally shift diplomatic recognition between Beijing and Taipei. In keeping with the "One China Policy", it is not possible for any country to maintain official diplomatic relations with "both Chinas", and this "either/or" factor has resulted in the PRC and the ROC actively courting diplomatic favours from small Pacific nations. In 2003, the People's Republic of China announced it intended to enhance its diplomatic ties with the Pacific Islands Forum, and increase the economic aid package it provided to that organisation. At the same time, PRC delegate Zhou Whenzhong added: "[T]he PIF should refrain from any exchanges of an official nature or dialogue partnership of any form with Taiwan". In 2006, Chinese Premier Wen Jiabao announced that the PRC would increase its economic cooperation with Pacific Island States. The PRC would provide more economic aid, abolish tariffs for exports from the Pacific's least developed countries, annul the debt of those countries, distribute free anti-malaria medicines, and provide training for two thousand Pacific Islander government officials and technical staff. Also in 2006, Wen became the first Chinese premier to visit the Pacific islands, which the Taipei Times described as "a longtime diplomatic battleground for China and Taiwan". Similarly, according to Ron Crocombe, Professor of Pacific Studies at the University of the South Pacific, "There have been more Pacific Islands minister visits to China than to any other country".

Micronesia joined the Belt and Road Initiative (BRI) in 2018.
