= Demographics of Fiji =

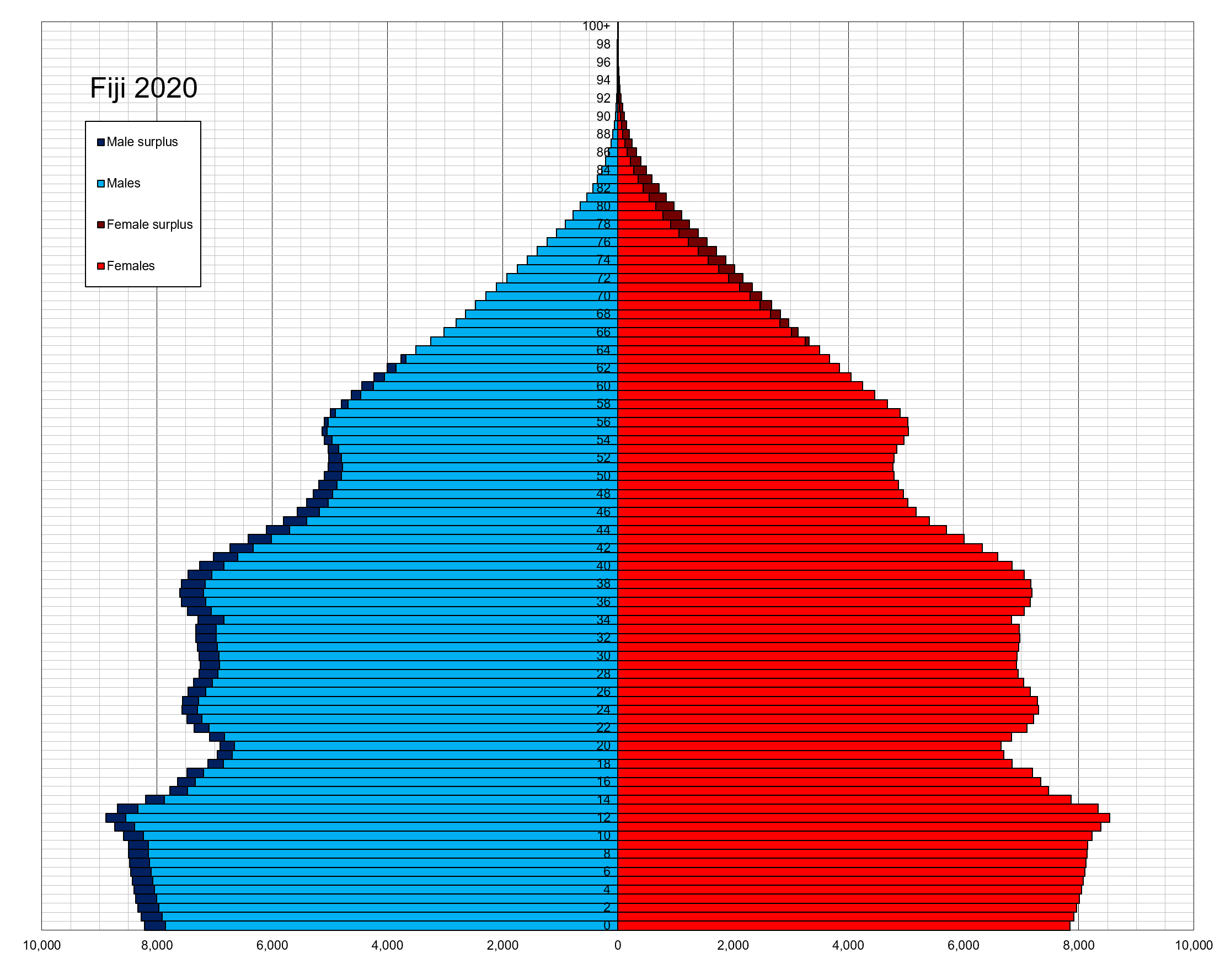
- Fiji population pyramid in 2020
- Population: 884,887
- Density: 49.4/km^{2}
- Growth rate: 3.8 (2024 est.)
- Birth rate: 22.5 (2017 est.)
- Death rate: 8.10 (2017 est.)
- Life expectancy: 72.1 (2014 est.)
  - male: 65.4
  - female: 68.5
- Fertility rate: 2.9 (2017 est.)
- Infant mortality rate: 12.5 (2017 est.)

Age structure
- 0–14 years: 28.2% (2014 est.)
- 15–64 years: 66.0 (2014 est.)
- 65 and over: 5.6% (2014 est.)

Sex ratio
- Total: 1.03 males/females (2014 est.)
- At birth: 1.05 males/females (2014 est.)
- Under 15: 1.05 males/females (2014 est.)
- 15–64 years: 1.04 males/females (2014 est.)
- 65 and over: 0.85 males/females (2014 est.)

Nationality
- Nationality: noun Fijian(s), adj. Fijian
- Major ethnic: 56.8% Itaukei (2007 est.)
- Minor ethnic: 37.5% Indian, 1.2% Rotuman (2007 est.)

Language
- Official: English, Fijian, Fiji Hindi

The demographic characteristics of the population of Fiji are known through censuses, usually conducted in ten-year intervals, and has been analysed by statistical bureaus since the 1880s. The Fijian Bureau of Statistics (FBOS) has performed this task since 1996, the first enumerated Fiji census when an independent country. The 2017 census found that the permanent population of Fiji was 884,887, compared to 837,271 in the 2007 census. The population density at the time in 2007 was 45.8 inhabitants per square kilometre, and the overall life expectancy in Fiji was 67 years. Since the 1930s the population of Fiji has increased at a rate of 1.1% per year. Since the 1950s, Fiji's birth rate has continuously exceeded its death rate. The population is dominated by the 15–64 age segment. The median age of the population was 27.9, and the gender ratio of the total population was 1.03 males per 1 female.

Indigenous Fijians, the native inhabitants of Fiji, are a mixture of Polynesian and Melanesian, resulting from the original migrations to the South Pacific over time. The Indo-Fijian population increased rapidly from the 61,000 people brought from the Indian subcontinent (modern day India, Bangladesh, Pakistan) between 1879 and 1916 to work in the sugarcane fields, many who later would lease/own the sugar cane plantations.

In 1977 The Economist reported that ethnic Fijians were a minority of 255,000, in a total population of 600,000 of which fully half were of Indian descent, with the remainder Chinese, European and of mixed ancestry.

The native Fijians live throughout the country, while the Indo-Fijians reside primarily near the urban centres and in the cane-producing areas of the two main islands. Nearly all of the indigenous Fijians are Christian, with some two-thirds being Methodist. The Indo-Fijians, by contrast, have a similar religious mix as India today: some 76.7% percent of the Indo-Fijians are Hindu, with a further almost 16% being Muslim and 6 percent Christian. There are also a few Sikhs.

A national census is supposed to be conducted every ten years, but the census intended for 2006 was postponed until 2007. Finance Minister Ratu Jone Kubuabola announced on 27 October 2005 that the Cabinet had decided that it would not be in the country's interest to have a census and a general election in the same year. "Peoples’ focus on the elections could have an impact on their cooperation with census officials", he said. The Statistics Office supported Kubuabola's announcement, saying that public interest in the general election would likely distract people's attention from the census, making it problematic to conduct.

Census population

Year	Pop.	±% p.a.
1881	127,486	—
1891	121,180	−0.51%
1901	120,124	−0.09%
1911	139,541	+1.51%
1921	157,266	+1.20%
1936	198,379	+1.56%
1946	259,638	+2.73%

Year	Pop.	±% p.a.
1956	345,737	+2.91%
1966	476,727	+3.26%
1976	588,068	+2.12%
1986	715,375	+1.98%
1996	775,077	+0.80%
2007	837,271	+0.70%
2017	884,887	+0.55%

== Structure of the population ==
Population by Sex and Age Group (Census 17.IX.2017):

Age group	Male	Female	Total	%
Total	448 595	436 292	884 887	100
0–4	47 195	44 702	91 897	10.39
5–9	45 243	43 052	88 295	9.98
10–14	40 715	38 881	79 596	9.00
15–19	38 032	36 056	74 088	8.37
20–24	37 464	36 152	73 616	8.32
25–29	35 253	34 055	69 308	7.83
30–34	35 266	33 552	68 818	7.78
35–39	33 382	31 768	65 150	7.36
40–44	27 697	25 817	53 514	6.05
45–49	25 314	24 190	49 504	5.59
50–54	24 649	23 961	48 610	5.49
55–59	21 263	20 745	42 008	4.75
60–64	14 891	15 724	30 615	3.46
65-69	10 076	11 252	21 328	2.41
70-74	6 367	7 781	14 148	1.60
75+	5 788	8 604	14 392	1.63
Age group	Male	Female	Total	Percent
0–14	133 153	126 635	259 788	29.36
15–64	293 211	282 020	575 231	65.01
65+	22 231	27 637	49 868	5.64

Population Estimates by Sex and Age Group (17.IX.2021):

Age group	Male	Female	Total	%
Total	453 116	440 352	893 468	100
0–4	45 067	43 434	88 501	9.91
5–9	45 198	43 351	88 550	9.91
10–14	43 891	41 667	85 559	9.58
15–19	39 545	37 635	77 179	8.64
20–24	37 195	35 500	72 695	8.14
25–29	35 544	34 702	70 246	7.86
30–34	32 251	31 377	63 628	7.12
35–39	31 807	30 514	62 321	6.98
40–44	29 333	28 020	57 352	6.42
45–49	23 948	22 534	46 482	5.20
50–54	22 277	21 336	43 612	4.88
55–59	21 435	20 578	42 013	4.70
60–64	17 589	17 132	34 722	3.89
65-69	11 863	12 629	24 492	2.74
70-74	7 823	8 791	16 614	1.86
75+	8 350	11 152	19 502	2.18
Age group	Male	Female	Total	Percent
0–14	134 156	128 452	262 608	29.39
15–64	290 924	279 328	570 252	63.82
65+	28 036	32 572	60 608	6.78

== Registered births and deaths ==
Year	Population	Live births	Deaths	Natural increase	Crude birth rate	Crude death rate	Rate of natural increase	TFR
1996	775,077	17,608	4,604	13,004	22.7	6.2	16.5	2.80
1997		16,977	5,578	11,399	21.6	5.5	16.1	2.60
1998		16,910	5,240	11,670	21.2	5.4	15.8	2.60
1999		16,916	5,667	11,249	21.0	4.5	16.5	2.60
2000		17,966	5,914	12,052	22.2	5.3	16.9	2.70
2001		16,689	5,774	10,915	20.5	6.1	14.4	2.50
2002		16,990	5,632	11,358	20.6	6.2	14.4	2.50
2003		17,701	6,116	11,585	21.2	6.1	15.1	2.60
2004		17,199	5,628	11,571	20.9	6.8	14.1	2.60
2005		16,900	5,963	10,937	20.3	7.1	13.2	2.50
2006	830,619	17,356	6,154	11,202	20.8	7.4	13.4	2.60
2007	834,517	17,456	6,359	11,097	20.9	7.6	13.3	2.50
2008	841,373	17,199	6,471	10,728	20.4	7.7	12.7	2.50
2009	845,462	18,211	6,119	12,092	21.5	7.2	14.3	2.70
2010	850,700	22,220	5,966	16,254	24.4	7.2	17.2	3.00
2011	854,290	19,547	6,151	13,396	22.9	7.5	15.4	2.90
2012	858,038	18,434	6,431	12,003	21.5	7.6	13.9	2.84
2013	862,068	18,633	6,488	12,145	21.6	7.6	14.0	2.71
2014	865,716	19,143	6,573	12,570	21.9	8.0	13.9	2.92
2015	869,458	19,081	6,672	12,409	21.7	7.7	14.0	2.91
2016	873,210	19,180	7,588	11,592	21.8	8.6	13.2	2.8
2017	884,887	19,646	6,925	12,654	22.2	7.8	14.3	2.7
2018	889,649	19,690	7,510	12,180	22.2	8.4	13.8	2.6
2019	894,410	19,825	7,591	12,234	22.2	8.5	13.7	2.8
2020	899,172	21,040	7,784	13,256	23.4	8.7	14.7	
2021		20,217	8,815	11,402	22.4	9.8	12.6	

== Ethnic groups ==
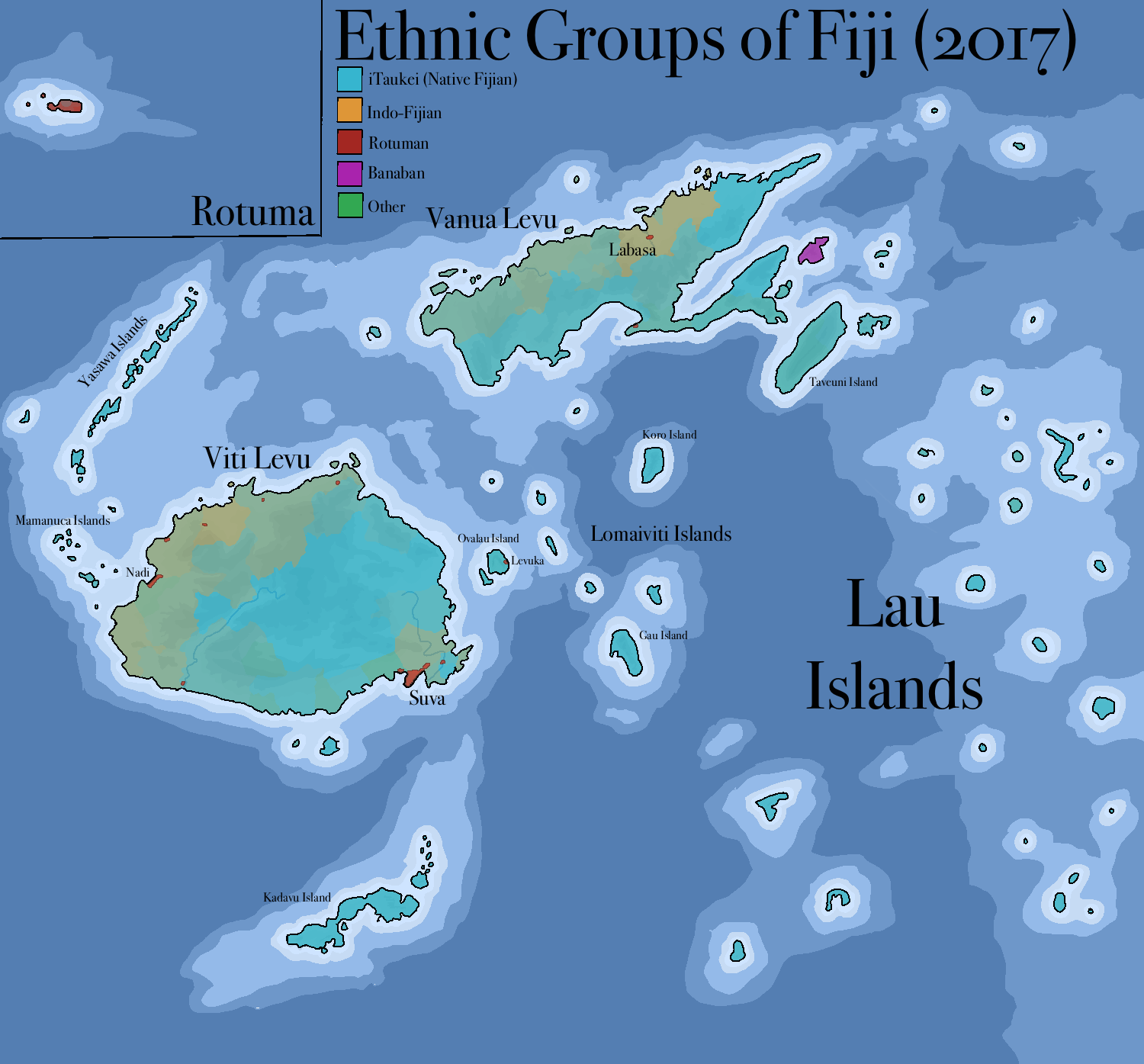
Ethnic Map of Fiji based on the 2017 census.

At the time of the 2017 census the largest ethnic group of Fiji was the iTaukei (Indigenous Fijians) with 555,499 members (62.8%), followed by the Indo-Fijian population with 289,237 members (32.7%), while other ethnicities constituted 40,151 individuals combined (4.5%). Other ethnicities include Chinese, European, Jewish, as well as non-Fijian Pacific Islanders ethnicities, including the Banaban people in Rabi Island. The only autochthonous minority are Rotumans from Fiji dependency Rotuma island with 1,594 people (of all ethnicities) living at Rotuma itself (2017 census) and ~9,000 or up to 20,000 Rotumans living across the Fiji archipelago.

Compared to previous censuses, the 2017 census indicated that the iTaukei population had been growing during the 1996-2017 period at the rate of 1.6-1.7% per annum, while the Indo-Fijian population had been slowly declining at the rate of 0.8% per year.

According to the 2007 Census of Fiji, the number of iTaukei Fijians increased from 393,575 in 1996 to 475,739, while the number of Indo-Fijians decreased from 338,818 to 313,798. According to government statistics, the latest estimated population of Indigenous Fijians is counted at 511,838, while there are 290,129 Indians and 56,071 Others (January 2012).

== Religion ==
Religion (1996 census)	Indigenous House		Indo-Fijian		Others		TOTAL	
Religion (1996 census)	393,575	%	338,818	%	42,684	%	775,077	%
Methodists	261,972	66.6	5,432	1.6	13,224	31.0	280,628	36.2
Roman Catholics	52,163	13.3	3,520	1.0	13,637	31.9	69,320	8.9
Assemblies of God	24,717	6.2	4,620	1.4	1,735	4.1	31,072	4.0
Seventh-day Adventists	19,896	5.1	572	0.2	1,719	4.0	22,187	2.9
Anglicans	2,508	0.6	1,208	0.4	2,609	6.2	6,325	0.8
Jehovah's Witness	4,815	1.2	486	0.1	801	1.9	6,102	0.8
CMF (Every Home)	5,149	1.3	269	0.1	255	0.6	5,673	0.7
Latter Day Saints	2,253	0.6	633	0.2	589	1.4	3,475	0.4
Apostolics	2,237	0.6	250	0.1	106	0.2	2,593	0.3
Gospelers	618	0.2	514	0.2	222	0.5	1,354	0.2
Baptists	695	0.2	382	0.1	219	0.5	1,296	0.2
Salvation Army	628	0.2	251	0.1	110	0.3	989	0.1
Presbyterians	105	0.0	90	0.0	188	0.4	383	0.0
Other Christians	12,624	3.2	2,492	0.7	2,969	7.0	18,085	2.3
All Christians	390,380	99.2	20,719	6.1	38,383	89.9	449,482	58.0
Sanatanis	551	0.1	193,061	57.0	315	0.7	193,927	25.0
Arya Samajis	44	0.0	9,493	2.8	27	0.1	9,564	1.2
Kabirpanthis	43	0.0	73	0.0	2	0.0	118	0.0
Sathya Sai devotees	7	0.0	52	0.0	1	0.0	60	0.0
Other Hindus	219	0.1	57,096	16.9	113	0.3	57,428	7.4
All Hindus	864	0.2	259,775	76.7	458	1.1	261,097	33.7
Sunnis	175	0.0	32,082	9.5	94	0.2	32,351	4.2
Ahmadiyyas	18	0.0	1,944	0.6	14	0.0	1,976	0.3
Other Muslim	131	0.0	19,727	5.8	138	0.3	19,996	2.6
All Muslims	324	0.1	53,753	15.9	246	0.6	54,323	7.0
Sikhs	0	0.0	3,076	0.9	0	0.0	3,076	0.4
Baháʼís	389	0.1	25	0.0	149	0.3	563	0.1
Confucians	8	0.0	21	0.0	336	0.8	365	0.0
Other religions	61	0.0	314	0.1	664	1.6	1,039	0.1
No religion†	1,549	0.4	1,135	0.3	2,448	5.7	5,132	0.7

† Includes atheists and agnostics.

Source: Fiji Statistics Department

As of the end of 2006 the LDS church reports 14,448 members in Fiji, which equal about 1.4% of the population. The LDS church also operates a temple in Fiji.
