= Eliza (1808) =

American ship wrecked in Fiji in 1808

History

United States
- Name: Eliza
- Owner: Brown & Ives
- Homeport: Providence, Rhode Island
- Fate: Wrecked June 1808

General characteristics
- Type: Brig
- Tons burthen: 135 bm
- Sail plan: Full-rigged ship
- Crew: 10

Eliza was an American brig wrecked at Fiji in 1808. Eliza had been constructed and registered at Providence, Rhode Island, United States. She carried a crew of ten and was owned by Brown & Ives.

Eliza arrived at Port Jackson from Buenos Aires on 9 December 1807, and remained in Sydney until 22 April 1808 when she departed for Norfolk Island and Fiji. She carried at least one soldier of the NSW Corps to Norfolk Island. She is recorded touching at Tonga 14 June. It was some days later in June when she was wrecked south-southwest of Nairai Island, becoming a total loss. One European man, whom Eliza had rescued from the wrecked Port au Prince, drowned. While the rest of the crew waited, Eliza's master, E. Hill Corri, and his two mates travelled in a whaleboat to Sandalwood Bay where on 29 June 1808 they found the brig Elizabeth and the American ship Jenny lying at anchor. Corri and a rescue crew from both these ships travelled the 60–70 miles back to the Eliza wreck, where they were promptly attacked by natives. The natives killed the cooper from Elizabeth, but the remaining sailors, led by Eliza's second officer, Seth Barton, counterattacked and defeated them.

Corri and his crew then sailed on Jenny for China but Jenny was dismasted at Guam and so he and his crew left her there.

Eliza is also notable for being the ship that carried Charlie Savage from Tonga to Fiji.

Another vessel named Eliza, a carval built sloop of 22 tons was operating in NSW waters at the same time, built in the colony in 1808, owned by Edward Wills, and mentioned several times in the Sydney Gazette. She is recorded departing with passengers to quit the colony (9 October 1808 Sydney Gazette) and is clearly a different vessel to the brig.
