= China–Samoa relations =

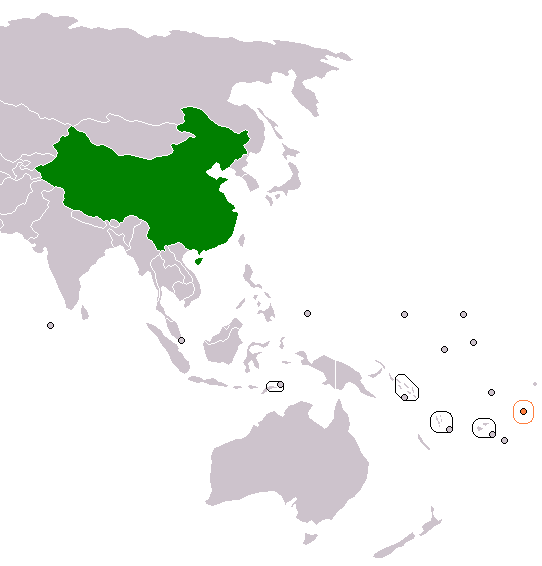

- China: Samoa

Samoa and the People's Republic of China (PRC) established official diplomatic relations in 1976. The two countries currently maintain cordial relations; China provides economic aid to Samoa.

== Diplomatic representation ==
China has operated an embassy in Apia since 1978. The current Ambassador of China in Samoa is Fei Mingxing.

Samoa has operated an embassy in Beijing since 2009.

== History ==
=== Context ===
Samoa has consistently recognised the People's Republic of China since 1975. In 1978, China established an embassy in Apia.

Oceania is, to the People's Republic of China and the Republic of China (Taiwan), a stage for continuous diplomatic competition. Ten states in Oceania recognise the PRC, and four recognise the ROC. These numbers fluctuate as Pacific Island nations re-evaluate their foreign policies, and occasionally shift diplomatic recognition between Beijing and Taipei. In keeping with the "One China" policy, it is not possible for any country to maintain official diplomatic relations with "both Chinas", and this "either/or" factor has resulted in the PRC and the ROC actively courting diplomatic favours from small Pacific nations.

=== 2000s ===
In 2003, the People's Republic of China announced it intended to enhance its diplomatic ties with the Pacific Islands Forum, and increase the economic aid package it provided to that organisation. At the same time, PRC delegate Zhou Whenzhong added: "[T]he PIF should refrain from any exchanges of an official nature or dialogue partnership of any form with Taiwan". In 2006, Chinese Premier Wen Jiabao announced that the PRC would increase its economic cooperation with Pacific Island States. The PRC would provide more economic aid, abolish tariffs for exports from the Pacific's least developed countries, annul the debt of those countries, distribute free anti-malaria medicines, and provide training for two thousand Pacific Islander government officials and technical staff. In 2006, Wen became the first Chinese premier to visit the Pacific islands, which the Taipei Times described as "a longtime diplomatic battleground for China and Taiwan". Similarly, according to Ron Crocombe, Professor of Pacific Studies at the University of the South Pacific, "There have been more Pacific Islands minister visits to China than to any other country".

In March 2008, following unrest in Tibet, the speaker of the Samoan Fono (legislative assembly), Tolofuaivalelei Falemoe Leiʻataua, stated that foreign leaders should not interfere with China as it deals with "internal affairs", and that they should not meet the Dalai Lama.

In June 2008, Samoa announced it would be opening diplomatic missions in China and Japan - the country's first diplomatic offices in Asia. In September 2008, the Chinese Ministry of Foreign Affairs issued a statement indicating that China and Samoa have always "conducted fruitful cooperation in the fields of economy, trade, agriculture, sports, culture, education and health, as well as international affairs", and that China intended to "make more tangible efforts to support Samoa's economic and social development".

=== 2010s ===
Samoa joined the Belt and Road Initiative (BRI) in 2018.

=== 2020s ===
In late May 2022, Samoan Prime Minister Fiamē Naomi Mataʻafa and Chinese Foreign Minister Wang Yi signed a bilateral agreement focusing on climate change, the COVID-19 pandemic and security.

== Aid and developmental assistance ==
In 2007 the PRC provided Samoa with an x-ray machine and several volunteer doctors. In 2008, the PRC donated over €1,360,000 to Samoa to fund its education policies.

In early February 2025 Radio New Zealand reported that villagers in the Safata district had sought financial assistance from the Chinese Embassy in response to a lack of assistance from the Samoan and New Zealand governments following the sinking of HMNZS Manawanui on 6 October 2024. Due to the ship's sinking, local villagers had been unable to fish in the area, causing significant economic hardship. By 7 February Safata district community leaders had met with Chinese Embassy staff in Apia, who gave an initial donation of WST$50,000 (NZ$30,000) to assist with livelihood assistance.

== See also ==
- Sino-Pacific relations#Samoa
