= Fiji–South Korea relations =

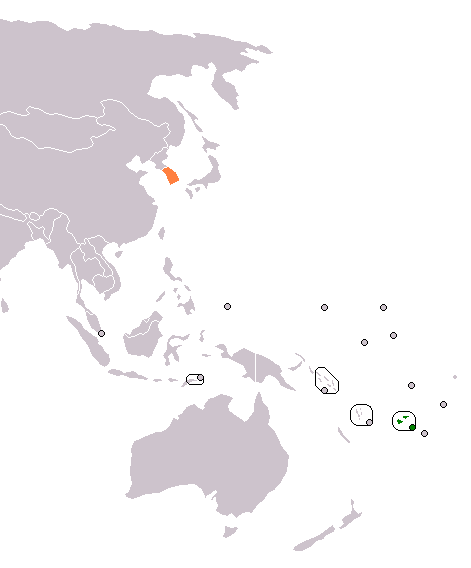

- Fiji: South Korea

Fiji and South Korea established official diplomatic relations in January 1971, Korea having recognised Fiji's accession to independence the previous year. There is a South Korean embassy in Suva and a Fijian embassy in Seoul. Fiji opened its embassy in Seoul in July 2012 to "foster trade and investment" and to "promote people-to-people exchanges".

== History ==
Some sources state that relations between Fiji and South Korea can be traced as far back as the Korean War, where Fiji sent its troops to fight under the British Flag as Fiji was a British colony at the time.

The then "interim government" of Fiji, led by Prime Minister Commodore Voreqe Bainimarama, continued the "Look North" foreign policy initiated by his predecessor Laisenia Qarase. This includes strengthening diplomatic and economic relations with South Korea, as well as with other Asian countries. Fiji's relations with Western countries are currently poor, due to the lack of democracy in the South Pacific nation, and it is in this context that the Bainimarama administration has turned to Asia. Fiji's Interim Foreign Minister Ratu Epeli Nailatikau has noted approvingly that South Korea has "not interfered in Fiji's political affairs", and that Fiji-ROK relations have been "cordial"; "The ROK has also been active in the provision of technical and other assistance."

In July 2007, Fiji's Interim Finance Minister Mahendra Chaudhry outlined his country's "Look North" foreign policy:

“Fiji has friends in China, it has friends in Korea, it has friends in [...] other Asian countries. We’re no longer relying on Australia and New Zealand. And in any event, the United States was not doing much for Fiji anyway.”

The Korean embassy in Fiji notes that "on the international arena such as the United Nations, Fiji has always provided support for Korea, confirming their solidarity and friendship."

In June 2009, the Fiji Democracy and Freedom Movement, an organisation founded in Australia to campaign for the restoration of democracy in Fiji, protested outside the South Korean embassy in Canberra, asking South Korea to "withdraw support for the military regime".

Fiji also maintains diplomatic relations with North Korea. Fiji first recognised North Korea in 1975, then suspended relations in 1987 "as part of the collective action of the international community" against North Korea's terrorist bombing of Korean Air Flight 858. Relations resumed in 2002 within the scope of Fiji's "Look North" policy of greater engagement with Asia. In 2012, Fiji became the first Pacific Island country to open a consulate in North Korea.

== State visits ==
In May 2014, Fijian President Ratu Epeli Nailatikau visited Seoul.

== Migration ==
There are approximately 1,000 Korean residents in Fiji.

== Economic relations ==
Trade remains on a low level; in 2011, by November, Korean exports into Fiji were worth about €13.5 million, while Fiji exports to South Korea were worth €11.5 million. Nonetheless, the previous month, the two countries had held "their first ever business forum" to promote enhanced trade relations. Fiji exports mainly sugar and textiles to Korea.

An inaugural Fiji-Korea Business Forum and Catalog Exhibition was held in Suva in October 2011, at the initiative of the Korea Trade Investment Promotion Agency, of Investment Fiji, and of the South Korean Embassy in Fiji. Its aim was to encourage Korean investment in Fiji, and trade between the two countries.

== See also ==
- Foreign relations of Fiji
- Foreign relations of South Korea
