= Tongan Australians =

Australian people of Tongan descent

Total population
- 43,465 (by ancestry, 2021); 12,265 (by birth, 2021).

Regions with significant populations
- Sydney, Brisbane, Melbourne

Languages
- English, Tongan

Religion
- Christian

Related ethnic groups
- Tongans

Tongan Australians (Tongan: kau ʻAositelēlia Tonga) are Australians who are of ethnic Tongan descent or Tongans who hold Australian citizenship.

== Background ==
According to the 2011 Australian census 10,560 Australians were born in Tonga, while 25,096 claimed Tongan ancestry. In 2006, 18,426 claimed Tongan ancestry, either alone or with another ancestry.

== History ==
Tongans were historically subject to the White Australia policy. In 1948, Akanesi Carrick – a cousin of Queen Sālote – and her two children were deported from Australia because of their race, despite being married to a British subject, Stewart Carrick. A Tongan man was deported from Australia in January 1975 because he had entered the country by "posing as a Maori". A decade later, another Tongan man sued the Australian Department of Immigration and Ethnic Affairs for racial discrimination, alleging the department was targeting Pacific Islanders in its administration of immigration law.

== Population ==
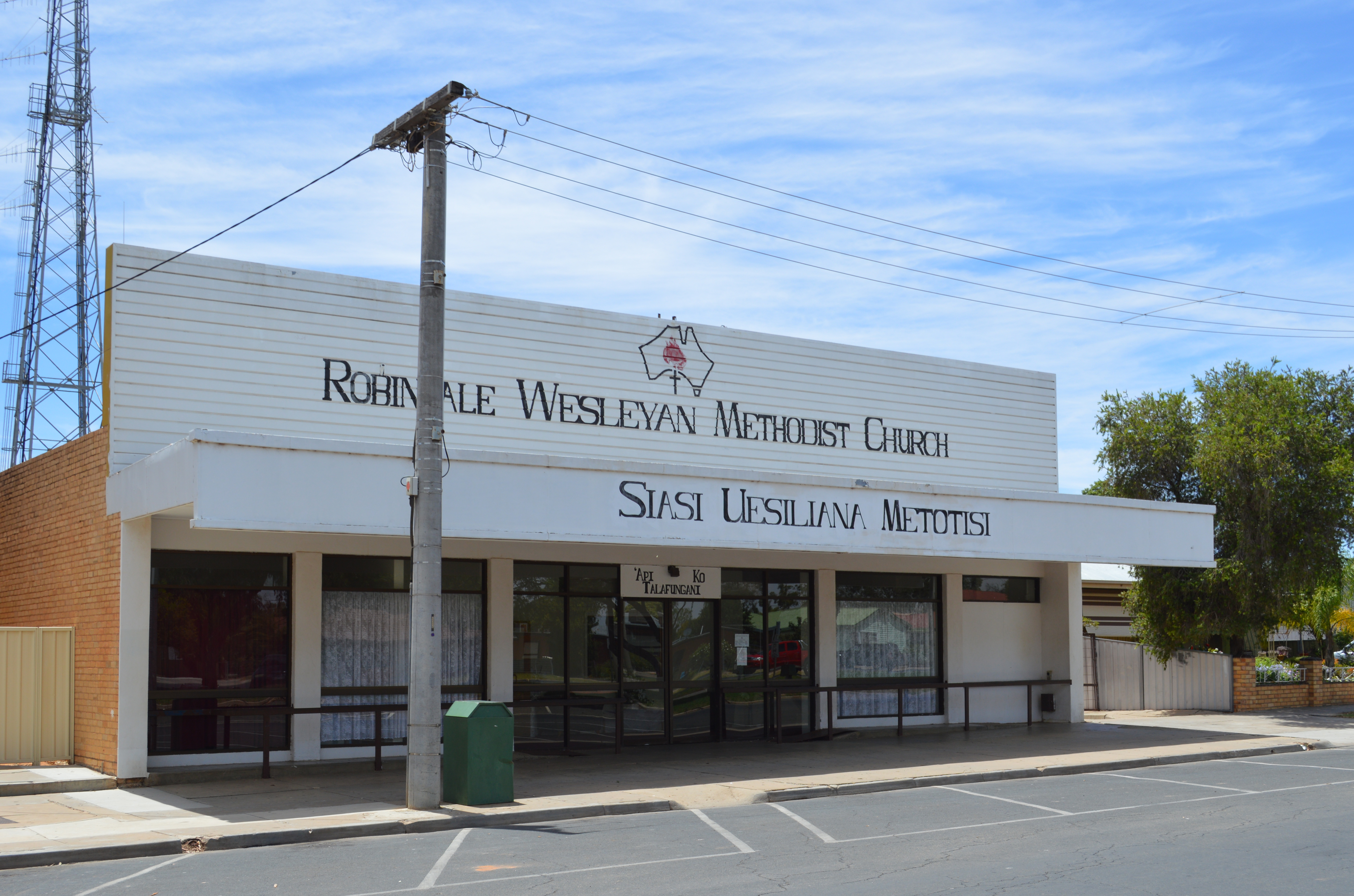
A Tongan Methodist church in Robinvale, where 5.9% of the population are of Tongan ancestry.

Tongan migrants to Australia have tended to make their homes in the "arrival city" suburbs of Sydney's west. This pattern began in the 1970s, intensified in the 1980s, and continues today. However, Tongans aren't exclusively settling in Western Sydney and actually widespread all over Sydney. There are Tongan communities on the Northshore areas of Sydney, such as the Northern beaches, Hornsby & Ryde area, South Sydney & the Eastern Suburbs. As of 2011, over 60% of Tongan-born Australians live in the state of New South Wales.

The 2006 Australian census recorded that the majority of the Tongan Australians (4920 people) live in New South Wales, followed by Victoria (with 1190 people) and Queensland (1090).

Despite there being relatively few Australians of Tongan descent, Tongan Australians have excelled in the football codes of Rugby league and Rugby Union as evidenced by the list of notable Tongan Australians which include:

- Israel Folau, tri-code footballer and dual code international, being a Queensland State of Origin and Australian international Rugby League representative, AFL convert with GWS, and most recently Rugby Union convert and Australian international Rugby Union representative with the NSW Waratahs Super Rugby club.
- Gorden Tallis, former Brisbane Broncos captain, and Queensland State of Origin and Australian International representative in Rugby League
- Viliami Ofahengaue, affectionately known as Willie O, former Wallaby number eight and Flanker with 41 caps between 1990 and 1998, including the 1991 and 1995 World Cups.

== Notable Tongan Australians ==
- Vika Bull
- Linda Bull
- Jim Dymock
- Andrew Emelio
- Richard Fa'aoso
- Anthony Fainga'a
- Saia Fainga'a
- Andrew Fifita
- David Fifita (born 1989)
- David Fifita (born 2000)
- Asipele Fine
- Israel Folau
- John Folau
- Tyson Frizell
- Danny Fualalo
- Mark Gerrard
- Mo'onia Gerrard
- David Hala
- Rev Mata Hiliau
- John Hopoate
- William Hopoate
- George Jennings
- Michael Jennings
- Robert Jennings
- Sione Katoa
- Toutai Kefu
- Sione Kite
- Keaon Koloamatangi
- Samisoni Langi
- Taniela Lasalo
- Hau Latukefu
- Uli Latukefu
- Andrew Lomu
- Manase Manuokafoa
- Sione Masima
- Willie Mason
- Tevita Metuisela
- Viliami Ofahengaue
- Haumole Olakauatu
- Lelea Paea
- Mickey Paea
- Wycliff Palu
- Tevita Pangai Junior
- Pat Politoni
- Tatafu Polota-Nau
- George Smith
- Moses Suli
- Siosifa Talakai
- Gordon Tallis
- Andrew Tangata-Toa
- Jorge Taufua
- Siosiua Taukeiaho
- Esikeli Tonga
- Vai Toutai
- Sione Tuipulotu
- Anthony Tupou
- Daniel Tupou
- Atelea Vea

== See also ==
- Tongan New Zealanders
- Australia–Tonga relations
