= China–Marshall Islands relations =

- China: Marshall Islands

China–Marshall Islands relations refers to the bilateral relations between the People's Republic of China and the Republic of the Marshall Islands.

== History ==
The two sides established diplomatic relations on November 16, 1990. Since the Marshall Islands established diplomatic relations with the Republic of China (Taiwan) on November 20, 1998, the People's Republic of China severed diplomatic relations with the Marshall Islands on December 11 of the same year.

After the severance of diplomatic relations, the Ministry of Foreign Affairs of the People's Republic of China stationed a resident team in Majuro, the capital of the Marshall Islands, and the Embassy of the People's Republic of China in the Federated States of Micronesia was responsible for the Marshall Islands' affairs.

In December 1998, the Government of the People's Republic of China suspended diplomatic relations with the Government of the Marshall Islands and withdrew its embassy in the Marshall Islands, but still retained a local embassy team and sent a counselor as the team leader.

- Li Huming (January 1999 - 2001)
- Cheng Shuping (? - ?)
- Cong Wu (2017 - 2022)

The magazine Islands Business reported that President Litokwa Tomeing, elected in January 2008, might break off his country's diplomatic relations with Taiwan, and turn instead to the PRC. However, in office Tomeing expressed continued support for ties with Taiwan and met with the Vice President of the ROC, Annette Lu, when she visited the Marshall Islands on 29 January 2008.

In June 2020, the Marshall Islands openly opposed the Hong Kong national security law.

In September 2022, two Chinese nationals were charged in U.S. federal court "in connection with a scheme to bribe elected officials of the Republic of the Marshall Islands (RMI) in exchange for passing certain legislation." They alleged attempt to establish a mini-state on the Marshall Islands.
