= China–Tuvalu relations =

- China: Tuvalu

China–Tuvalu relations refers to the bilateral relations between the People's Republic of China and Tuvalu. The two countries have never established diplomatic relations. The Embassy of China in Fiji is responsible for matters related to Tuvalu.

== History ==
On September 30, 1978, Chinese Premier and Chairman of the Chinese Communist Party Hua Guofeng sent a telegram to congratulate Tuvalu on its independence and announced that the Chinese government recognized the Tuvaluan government. On August 29, 1988, Tuvaluan Prime Minister Tomasi Puapua paid an informal visit to Beijing as part of the South Pacific Islands Conference delegation to China.

Tuvalu has established diplomatic relations with the Republic of China (Taiwan) since 1979. In 2000, China abstained from United Nations Security Council Resolution 1290, which regarded Tuvalu's admission to the United Nations. However, China chose to not veto the resolution, as it was still believed that it was in everyone's interest for Tuvalu to be admitted to the United Nations.

In 2006, Taiwan reacted to reports that the People's Republic of China was attempting to draw Tuvalu away from the Republic of China. Taiwan consequently strengthened its weakening diplomatic relations with Tuvalu.
