= Charles Savage (beachcomber) =

Person in the history of Fiji

Charles Savage, (?– September 6, 1813) was a sailor (most likely of Swedish descent) and beachcomber known for his exploits on the islands of Fiji between 1808 and 1813.

== Arrival at Fiji ==
Most accounts place Savage as a sailor aboard a ship registered in Port Jackson (Sydney), Australia, from which he was left in Tonga around 1807. From Tonga he was taken to Fiji by the Eliza which was wrecked near Nairai Island.

== Exploits with the Bau ==
Given his fluency of the Tongan and Fijian languages and proclivity for violence, Savage easily insinuated himself in the company of the Bau Island chieftain Naulivou. From the wreckage of the Eliza, Savage was able to salvage a number of muskets which he then demonstrated to the Bauan leaders. This combination of circumstance, personality, and technology allowed Savage to participate in the Fijian wars, allegedly the first time firearms were ever used in Fiji.

Savage led a small group of beachcombers as mercenaries in the service of Naulivou and quickly showed their worth in fights with his enemies. Lacking certain cultural inhibitions of Fijians (such as targeting opposing chieftains at the outset of battle) and leveraging their individual skill with muskets proved Savage and company as a violent and capable force in Fijian internecine warfare.

Savage is credited with using an arrow-proof structure built outside his enemies' fortifications so that he could fire at them with impunity. Other accounts of his lethality depict that his "victims were so numerous that the townspeople piled up the bodies and sheltered behind them; and the stream beside the village ran red."

For his services, Savage was accorded a certain amount of prestige and rewards from Naulivou, although the scope and magnitude of the more sensational details, to include numerous wives, influence on local politics, and becoming a cannibal chief in his own right, appear to be exaggerated accounts mixed with European yarns of "white savages".

== The events of Dillon's Rock ==
In 1813, the Hunter reached Fiji to ply in the sandalwood trade and subsequently employed a number of local European beachcombers including Savage. As recounted by third mate Peter Dillon, Savage was killed in a skirmish with Wailea Fijians on September 6, 1813. Ashore as a member of a party to destroy Wailean canoes, Savage and the other scattered members of the party found themselves the victims of an ambush. They attempted to flee back to the anchored Hunter, but found "it impossible to get to the boat through the crowds of natives that intercepted the pathway." At this point Dillon directed the men to climb a flat-topped hill of a rock (which later became Dillon's Rock) and organized a defense. Because of its steep and narrow ascent, the rock could only be climbed by a few persons at a time, allowing the defenders to maximize their volleys.

After some intense and sporadic exchanges, the Wailea fell back to a siege of sorts comprised (by Dillon's accounting) of several thousand natives. At this point, Savage suggested that they break and run, but this was outrightly dismissed by Dillon, who, to further accentuate his resolve, threatened to shoot the first man who attempted to run. Using the lull in fighting to attempt to parlay, Dillon reminded the Wailea that eight of their own, including a priest's brother, were held hostage on board the Hunter. Dillon proposed sending a man down to go to the ship to secure their release in exchange for the defenders. The Wailea agreed and so an injured defender was sent down to facilitate the transaction. During this ceasefire, several chiefs climbed the hill to implore the remaining defenders to accept offers of friendship and peace. Savage, confident in his knowledge of the language and customs was convinced that he could go down safely and secure some sort of resolution. Dillon disagreed and refused to leave the rock before the prisoner exchange, and allowed Savage to go only if he left his musket and ammunition behind.

Savage then descended the rock and spoke with the Wailea for some time who continued to try to convince Dillon to join them but to no avail. Finally, exasperated by Dillon's refusal to come down and triggered by another defender attempting to escape, the Wailea attacked the unarmed Savage and quickly overpowered him, eventually drowning him in a well. Dillon goes on to describe cannibalistic practices and rituals involved with Savage's and the others' bodies, but those details have been disputed by others.

== Results of Savage's exploits ==
The life of an archetypal beachcomber with few documented exploits has served as the legend-making clay of numerous writers and historians in the time since. Savage's influence (and by association muskets) on Fiji's history has been debated. Scholarly books and articles have examined Savage's legacy in terms of his aid in the rise of the Bau (and thus their subsequent dominance of Fiji), his introduction of firearms, and his role as an agent of social change with varying degrees of support and reproof.
