= Tongan New Zealanders =

Tongan immigrants in New Zealand

Total population
- 97,824 (2023)

Languages
- English, Tongan

Religion
- Christianity

Tongan New Zealanders, also known as Kiwi Tongans are Tongan immigrants in New Zealand, their descendants, and New Zealanders of Tongan ethnic descent. They constitute one of New Zealand's most sizeable ethnic minorities. In the 2013 census, 60,336 New Zealanders identified themselves as being of Tongan ethnicity with 22,413 stating that they were born in Tonga.

== Demographics ==
There were 82,389 people identifying as being part of the Tongan ethnic group at the 2018 New Zealand census, making up 1.7% of New Zealand's population. This is an increase of 22,056 people (36.6%) since the 2013 census, and an increase of 31,911 people (63.2%) since the 2006 census. Some of the increase between the 2013 and 2018 census was due to Statistics New Zealand adding ethnicity data from other sources (previous censuses, administrative data, and imputation) to the 2018 census data to reduce the number of non-responses.

There were 42,057 males and 40,355 females, giving a sex ratio of 1.042 males per female. Of the population, 31,539 people (38.3%) were aged under 15 years, 22,152 (26.9%) were 15 to 29, 24,969 (30.3%) were 30 to 64, and 3,729 (4.5%) were 65 or older.

In terms of population distribution, 75.7% of Tongan New Zealanders lived in the Auckland region, 17.1% lived in the North Island outside the Auckland region, and 7.2% lived in the South Island. The Māngere-Ōtāhuhu local board area of Auckland had the highest concentration of Tongan people at 20.1%, followed by the Ōtara-Papatoetoe local board area (10.7%) and the Maungakiekie-Tāmaki local board area (10.4%). The Waitaki District has the highest concentration of Tongan peoples outside of Auckland at 2.4%. The Chatham Islands and the Kaikōura District had the lowest concentrations, recording no Tongan people in their respective areas.

=== Religion ===
Religion	%
Methodist	24.6%
Catholic	15.4%
No religion	15.1%
Latter-day Saints	10.6%
Object to answering	5.2%

Source: 2018 census

== See also ==
- New Zealand–Tonga relations
- Tongan Australians
