= Chinese people in Tonga =

A significant Chinese presence in Tonga is relatively recent. There were approximately three or four thousand Chinese people living in Tonga in 2001, thus comprising 3 or 4% of the total Tongan population. This figure includes Tongan citizens of Chinese ethnicity, and marks a sharp increase from the 1996 census, which recorded only 55 persons on Chinese ethnicity living in Tonga. Chinese in Tonga and Chinese Tongans are Tonga's main ethnic minority group, and have been subjected to significant levels of racism, including racist violence, in recent years.

In the 1990s, the Tongan government controversially sold Tongan passports to Chinese nationals and residents of Hong Kong, enabling them to settle in Tonga and leading to the appearance of a visible Chinese community in the South Pacific kingdom. In 1999, the Tonga Chinese Association reported around 40 cases of harassment of Chinese businessmen, including several assaults, and Tonga's then-Crown Prince Tupoutoʻa condemned what he called "the racially motivated and cowardly violence which young jobless and, dare I say it, hopeless Tongans, visited on our Chinese-owned shops [in 1999]; an act of such barbarity that it shamed and disgusted me and every other Tongan of my generation". In 2000, local authorities in Nukunuku banned all Chinese shops from the district.

In 2001, there were about 100 reported cases of racial assault against Chinese by indigenous Tongans, including the destruction of Chinese owned shops. The violence was thought to have been fuelled in part by resentment against Chinese shop-keepers due to high levels of unemployment among indigenous Tongans. Tongan Prime Minister Prince ʻUlakalala Lavaka Ata responded to the violence by announcing that 600 Chinese residents would not have their work permits renewed, and would have to leave the country. This policy contradicted King Taufaʻahau Tupou IV's publicly expressed wish to see more Chinese immigrants settle in Tonga.

In 2006, riots in the Tongan capital, Nukuʻalofa, mainly targeted Chinese-owned businesses, leading to the emigration of several hundred Chinese.

== See also ==
- Sino-Tongan relations
