= List of projects of the Belt and Road Initiative =

This is a list of notable projects of Belt and Road Initiative grouped by region. Since its launch in 2013, the BRI has financed and built infrastructure across Africa, Asia, Europe, and the Americas.

Transport and energy projects dominate. They include:

- standard-gauge railways such as the Mombasa–Nairobi Standard Gauge Railway, the Addis Ababa–Djibouti Railway, and the Boten–Vientiane railway;
- Indonesia's Jakarta–Bandung high-speed railway;
- ports such as Piraeus in Greece, Hambantota in Sri Lanka, and Chancay in Peru;
- hydropower, coal and nuclear power plants.

Other projects include industrial parks and special economic zones, such as Ethiopia's Eastern Industrial Zone and the China–Belarus Industrial Park, as well as new urban developments, regular China–Europe freight train services, and small-scale development programs.

What counts as a BRI project varies between sources, and some projects listed here predate 2013 or were later brought under the BRI label.

== Africa ==
As of August 2022, 52 African countries had signed BRI agreements with China. BRI projects in Africa focus mainly on transport and power, including railways, expressways, seaports, and hydropower and fossil-fuel plants, along with water supply and sanitation. Chinese government and corporate spending on African infrastructure reached US$23 billion in 2020. China is the largest funder of infrastructure on the continent, financing about a fifth of projects and building about a third. A McKinsey & Company report estimated that more than 10,000 Chinese-owned firms operate in Africa, about 90 percent of them privately owned.

Studies have generally found positive economic effects, but rising debt has led some states to scale back their plans. According to the Johns Hopkins China Africa Research Initiative, East African countries alone have borrowed more than US$29 billion from China, and Djibouti, Kenya, and Uganda have raised concerns about the growing debt. The use of Chinese workers on many projects has also been controversial in countries with high youth unemployment.

=== Algeria ===
China is developing El Hamdania Central Port, Algeria's first deep-water port. It also helped complete the 1,200-kilometre (750 mi) East–West Highway, which links Algeria with Morocco and Tunisia.

=== Djibouti ===
The Export-Import Bank of China has lent Djibouti about US$1 billion, funding nearly 40 percent of the country's major infrastructure projects. These include the Addis Ababa–Djibouti Railway and the Ethiopia-Djibouti Water Pipeline. China also built its first overseas military base in Djibouti, a sign of its growing naval presence. China has argued that anti-piracy missions from the base support BRI projects.

=== Egypt ===
Egypt was among the first countries to join the BRI. Chinese projects include an industrial zone on the Gulf of Suez and construction in Egypt's New Administrative Capital, including an electric rail system. From 2015 to 2017 Egypt borrowed US$1.03 billion from China for infrastructure, and about 1,900 Chinese workers came to work on construction. Xi Jinping and President Abdel Fattah el-Sisi have repeatedly praised each other's BRI cooperation and emphasized their countries' shared ancient histories. In 2018 a Chinese consortium won a US$4.4 billion tender for a 6,000 MW coal-fired power plant at Hamrawein on the Red Sea. Egypt postponed the plant indefinitely in 2020.

=== Ethiopia ===
The Eastern Industrial Zone in Dukem, outside Addis Ababa, was built with support from the China-Africa Development Fund and houses Chinese manufacturers. By 2018 it had 83 resident companies, 56 of them in production. A study in Geoforum found that the zone had not yet driven wider economic development, because of poor infrastructure outside it and limited technology transfer. The Chinese-built 750-kilometre (470 mi) electric Addis Ababa–Djibouti Railway opened in 2016, cutting the journey between the two capitals from three days to about 12 hours.

=== Kenya ===
The US$3.2 billion Mombasa–Nairobi Standard Gauge Railway, agreed during a visit by Premier Li Keqiang in May 2014, was Kenya's largest infrastructure project since independence. Opened in 2017, the 470-kilometre (290 mi) line cut travel time between Mombasa and Nairobi to about 4.5 hours. In its first year it carried 1.3 million passengers and 600,000 tonnes of cargo.

=== Nigeria ===
The Abuja–Kaduna line, built by the China Civil Engineering Construction Corporation (CCECC), opened in July 2016 as the first section of the Lagos–Kano Standard Gauge Railway. CCECC also built the first 13-kilometre (8.1 mi) phase of the Lagos Rail Mass Transit Blue Line, which opened in September 2023. Under a 2015 pledge to bring satellite television to 10,000 African villages, China equipped 1,000 Nigerian villages and trained 1,000 local residents to maintain the systems.

=== Sudan ===
China helped build Sudan's oil industry before the BRI and has supported its cotton sector. Plans announced in 2018 included railways, roads, ports, power plants, and dams. In 2022 Sudan Railways received the first 21 of 34 locomotives ordered from China's CRRC Ziyang.

=== Tanzania ===
In December 2022 Tanzania signed a US$2.2 billion contract with a Chinese company to build the final section of a standard-gauge railway. The railway links the port of Dar es Salaam with Mwanza on Lake Victoria, with planned spurs to Burundi, the Democratic Republic of the Congo, Rwanda, and Uganda.

=== Uganda ===
Chinese loans financed two major dams, the Karuma and Isimba hydropower stations. The Export-Import Bank of China covered about 85 percent of the cost, with the Ugandan government providing the rest. Uganda also borrowed US$350 million for the Entebbe–Kampala Expressway at a 2% fixed rate over 20 years. President Yoweri Museveni has praised Chinese funding for coming with "no strings attached". Critics warn about Uganda's debt, which reached US$10 billion in 2018, about a third of it owed to China.

== Asia ==
=== Central Asia ===
Kazakhstan, Kyrgyzstan, Tajikistan, Turkmenistan, and Uzbekistan lie on the BRI's main overland routes. One survey identified 261 BRI projects in the region.

- Kazakhstan had invested about US$30 billion in transport and logistics infrastructure by 2019. Its sections of the Western Europe–Western China highway now link China and Europe via Russia. The World Bank estimated that the country could earn up to US$5 billion a year in transit fees.
- Kyrgyzstan received US$4.1 billion in committed BRI funds between 2011 and 2017. The resulting firms account for only 0.1–0.3 percent of national employment.
- Uzbekistan signed 115 deals worth more than US$23 billion with China in 2017, covering energy, chemicals, textiles, transport, and agriculture. China is its largest trading partner.
- Tajikistan hosts projects ranging from roads and pipelines to power plants. In 2018 it paid a Chinese company for a power plant with rights to a gold mine, having earlier swapped land for debt relief.
- A Five Nations Railway Corridor linking China and Iran through Kyrgyzstan, Tajikistan, and Afghanistan has been proposed since 2014.

=== Hong Kong ===
In his 2016 policy address, Chief Executive Leung Chun-ying mentioned "One Belt, One Road" 48 times and proposed a Maritime Authority to strengthen Hong Kong's role in the initiative, though he gave few details.

=== Indonesia ===
The 142-kilometre (88 mi) Jakarta–Bandung high-speed railway, built by a consortium led by China Railway International, cut the journey between the two cities from more than three hours to about 40 minutes. Originally due in 2019, it was delayed by land clearance and other problems. It opened on 1 October 2023 as Southeast Asia's first high-speed railway.

=== Laos ===
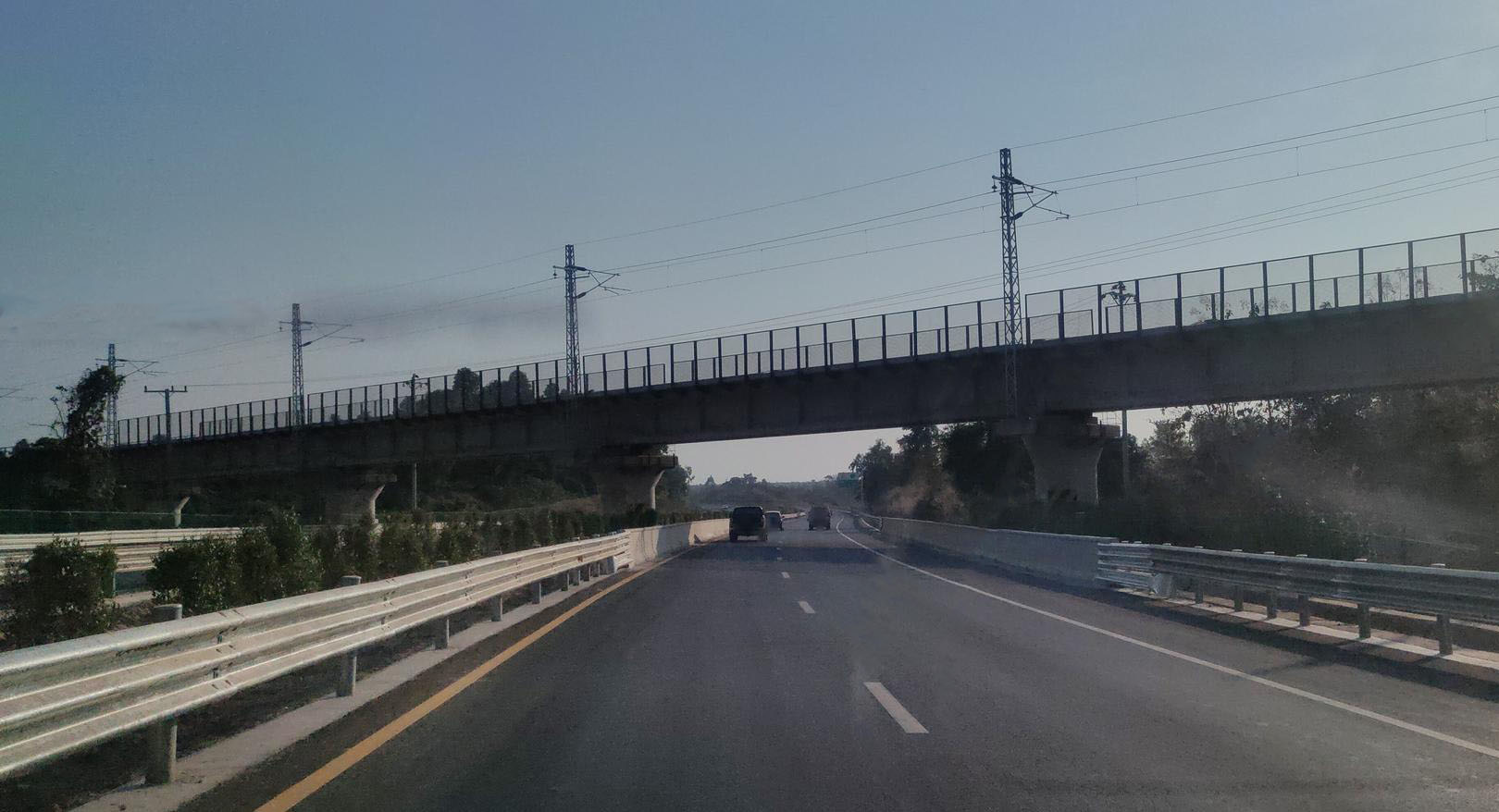
The Boten–Vientiane railway crossing the Vientiane–Boten Expressway, both BRI projects

The 414-kilometre (257 mi) electrified Boten–Vientiane railway was built from 2016 to 2021. It is China's first overseas railway connected to its domestic network, and part of the planned Kunming–Singapore railway. Its US$5.95 billion cost equaled nearly half of Laos's GDP. China owns 70 percent of the line, and Laos financed most of its 30 percent stake with Chinese loans.

=== Malaysia ===
Under Prime Minister Najib Razak, Malaysia agreed to several large Chinese-backed projects. These included the East Coast Rail Link (ECRL), pipelines worth more than US$3.1 billion, and the US$100 billion Forest City development in Johor. After winning the 2018 election, Mahathir Mohamad called the deals unfair and warned they would leave Malaysia indebted to China. In August 2018 he suspended the ECRL and cancelled two pipeline projects linked to the 1MDB scandal. After renegotiation, work on the ECRL resumed in April 2019 at a reduced cost of RM44 billion (US$10.68 billion), down from RM65.5 billion. The 14.2-square-kilometre (3,500-acre) Malaysia–China Kuantan Industrial Park in Pahang hosts heavy and light industry and logistics.

=== Maldives ===
Under President Abdulla Yameen (2013–2018), the Maldives undertook several Chinese-funded projects, including the China Maldives Friendship Bridge, an expansion of Velana International Airport, and development of the artificial island of Hulhumalé, often without public disclosure of costs. The government also amended the constitution to allow foreign land ownership, after which a Chinese company leased the island of Feydhoo Finolhu.

=== Pakistan ===
The China–Pakistan Economic Corridor is one of the BRI's largest programs, covering transport, energy, and port infrastructure, including Gwadar Port.

=== Sri Lanka ===
China's largest project in Sri Lanka is the Hambantota International Port, funded mainly by the Chinese government and built by Chinese companies. In 2017 Sri Lanka leased the port to China Merchants Port for 99 years. The lease is often cited as an example of debt-trap diplomacy. Analysts have argued, however, that Sri Lanka's debt distress stemmed mainly from borrowing on Western-dominated capital markets and domestic policy decisions, and that the lease proceeds were used to shore up foreign reserves rather than to repay port loans. The Colombo International Financial City, a special financial zone built on reclaimed land with US$1.4 billion in Chinese investment, is another major project. In 2022 Sri Lanka defaulted on its foreign debt, with China among its creditors.

=== Thailand ===
The Thai–Chinese Rayong Industrial Zone, developed since 2005 by China's Holley Group and Thailand's Amata Group, hosts Chinese solar, rubber, and other manufacturers. Construction of a high-speed railway from Bangkok to Nakhon Ratchasima began in December 2017. It is planned to extend to Nong Khai and link with the Laos railway as part of the Kunming–Singapore route. In 2019 Thai officials hoped to have trains running by 2023.

=== Turkey ===
In November 2015 Turkey and China signed a memorandum of understanding to align the BRI with Turkey's Middle Corridor initiative.

== Caucasus ==
Georgia was among the first countries to sign a BRI memorandum, in March 2015. In 2019 Armenian President Armen Sarkissian said it was time for Armenia to become part of the "new Silk Road".

== Europe ==
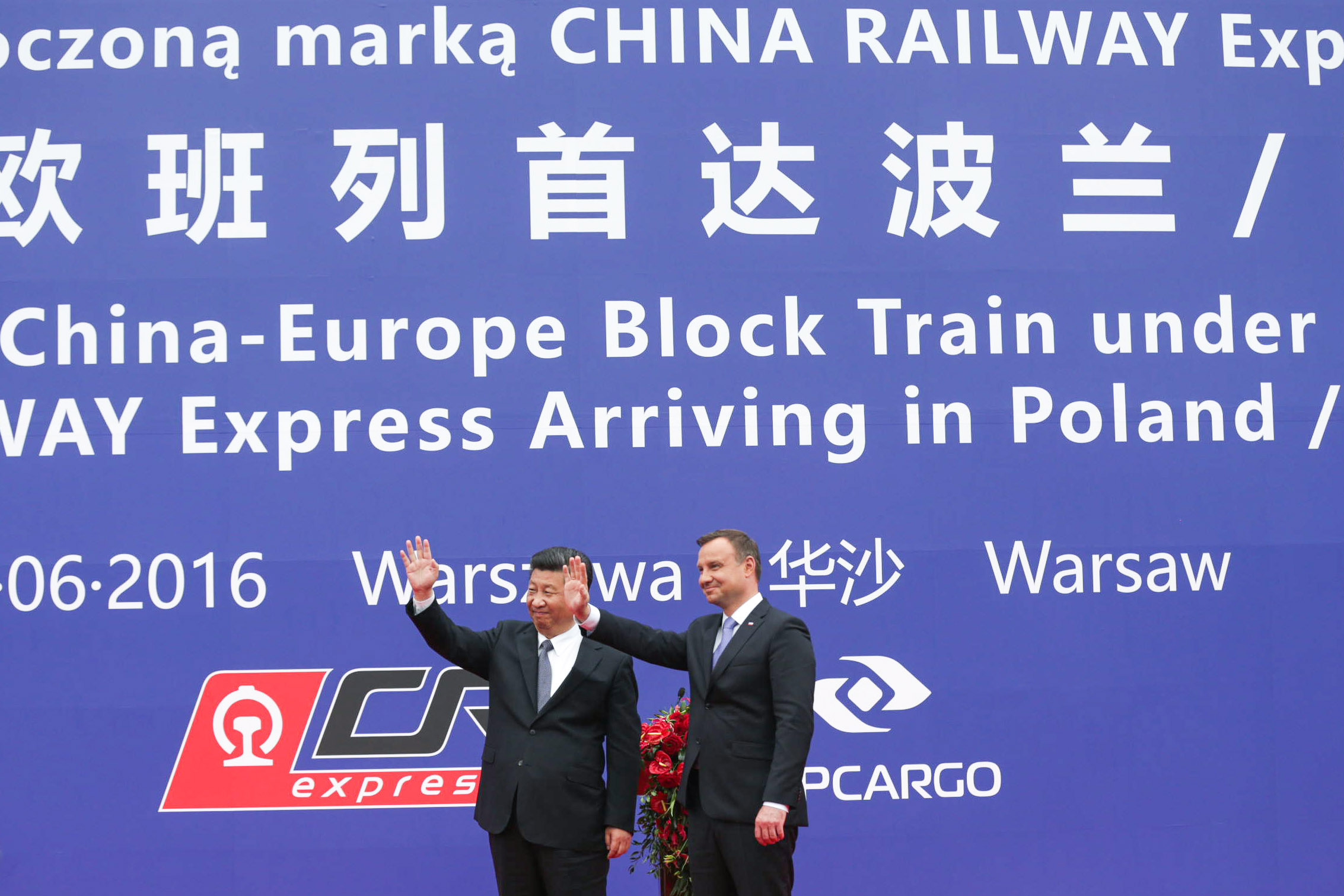
Polish President Andrzej Duda and Xi Jinping at the inauguration of a China Railway Express service in Warsaw, 20 June 2016

Regular China–Europe freight train services began in 2011. A China–Britain route was launched in January 2017. By August 2018 the network linked 48 Chinese cities with 42 European destinations and had completed 10,000 trips.

=== Greece ===
Greece signed a BRI memorandum of understanding in August 2018. After China's state-owned COSCO acquired a majority stake in the Port of Piraeus, the port became one of the Mediterranean's main transshipment hubs, drawing traffic away from other ports in the southeastern Mediterranean. Critics attribute COSCO's extensive, long-term control of the port to Greece's lack of a coherent national port policy.

=== Other European countries ===
Poland signed a BRI memorandum in 2015, and President Duda said he hoped Poland would become China's gateway to Europe. Portugal signed a memorandum in December 2018. In March 2019 Italy became the first G7 country to sign one. Italy later let its memorandum lapse, in 2024. Austria and Switzerland signed BRI cooperation memoranda in April 2019. Luxembourg joined in March 2019, and the Zhengzhou–Luxembourg "Air Silk Road" cargo link has become a focus of its cooperation with China.

== Russia and the Eurasian Economic Union ==
In 2019 Xi and Russian President Vladimir Putin agreed to link the BRI with the Eurasian Economic Union as part of a "Greater Eurasian Partnership". The 91.5 km^{2} (35.3 sq mi) China–Belarus Industrial Park near Minsk, established in 2013, had attracted 36 international companies by August 2018.

== Americas ==
Panama was the first Latin American country to join the BRI, in 2017. It was followed by Bolivia, Antigua and Barbuda, Trinidad and Tobago, and Guyana, and later by Barbados, Cuba, Dominica, the Dominican Republic, Grenada, Jamaica, and Suriname. Panama withdrew in February 2025.

=== Argentina ===
The China Gezhouba Group Corporation is building two dams on the Santa Cruz River, Condor Cliff and La Barrancosa, which are expected to create 5,000 direct jobs. In 2021 Argentina announced plans for a US$8 billion Hualong One nuclear power plant, 85 percent financed by Chinese banks. It would be one of China's first exports of its domestic reactor technology.

=== Bolivia ===
Of six proposed Chinese-associated hydropower projects in Bolivia, two had been completed by 2019: San José I in 2018 and San José II in 2019. Chinese firms have also built highway infrastructure, including the Parapetí Bridge on the El Espino–Charagua–Boyuibe highway, which opened in 2020.

=== Ecuador ===
A study of eight Chinese-associated hydropower projects in Ecuador found mixed results. Four were completed with limited environmental harm and positive community programs, and two were delayed after contract terminations. The largest, Coca Codo Sinclair, was completed but marred by corruption and environmental and community damage, and another, Toachi Pilatón, was delayed by corruption.

=== Peru ===
In 2019 COSCO agreed to build a new deep-water port at Chancay, north of Lima. China Harbour Engineering Company was chosen in 2022 to build the 992-hectare (2,450-acre) complex. Analysts have described the port as an example of China securing the supply chains behind its economic growth. Xi and Peruvian President Dina Boluarte inaugurated the port in November 2024.

=== Venezuela ===
Venezuela signed a "strategic development partnership" with China in 2001, long before the BRI, and joined the initiative in 2018. Chinese loans to Venezuela reached at least US$50 billion by 2017, about a third of the China Development Bank's lending in Latin America.

== See also ==
- Belt and Road Initiative
- Foreign relations of China
