= Néstor Kirchner (disambiguation) =

Néstor Kirchner (1950–2010) was an Argentinian politician who served as the president of Argentina from 2003 to 2007.

Néstor Kirchner may also make reference to:

- The 2010–11 Argentine Primera División season (named "Torneo Clausura Néstor Kirchner")
- The Néstor Kirchner Cultural Centre
- The Néstor Kirchner Dam
