= EIZ =

EIZ may refer to:

== eiz ==
- eiz, a pseudo-register used with the ModR/M byte in the x86 assembly language instruction set

== Eiz ==
- Geographical feature of Elm-Lappwald Nature Park

== EIZ ==
- Eastern Industrial Zone (Ethiopia), a project of the Belt and Road Initiative
- Eastern Industrial Zone (Pakistan), part of Port Qasim
- EIZ, partner of Northern Technical College
- Ekonomski institut Zagreb, publisher of works by Slavko Kulić
