= Foreign relations of China =

Official diplomatic relations between world states and China People's Republic of China (PRC) Republic of China (ROC) States that have diplomatic relations with the PRC States that have diplomatic relations with the ROC States that have diplomatic relations with neither

Countries of the world indicating decade diplomatic relations commenced with the People's Republic of China: 1949/1950s (dark red), 1960s (red), 1970s (orange), 1980s (beige), 1990s/2000s (yellow) and 2010s/2020s (green). Countries not recognized by or not recognizing the PRC are in grey.

The People's Republic of China (PRC), has full diplomatic relations with 180 out of the other 192 United Nations member states, the Cook Islands, Niue, and Palestine. As of 2024, the country has the most diplomatic missions of any state.

By law, the Chinese Communist Party (CCP) has authority over the country's foreign policy. The PRC officially claims it "unswervingly pursues an independent foreign policy of peace". The fundamental goals of this policy are to preserve China's independence, sovereignty and territorial integrity, create a favorable international environment for China's reform and opening up and modernization of construction, and to maintain world peace and propel common development." An example of a foreign policy decision guided by "sovereignty and territorial integrity" is not engaging in diplomatic relations with any country that recognizes the Republic of China (Taiwan), which the PRC does not recognize as a separate nation.

The PRC is a member of many international organizations, holding key positions such as a permanent membership on the United Nations Security Council. In the early 1970s, the PRC replaced the ROC as the recognized government of "China" in the UN following Resolution 2758. As a nuclear power, China signed the Treaty on the Non-Proliferation of Nuclear Weapons in the United Nations.

== Foreign policy ==
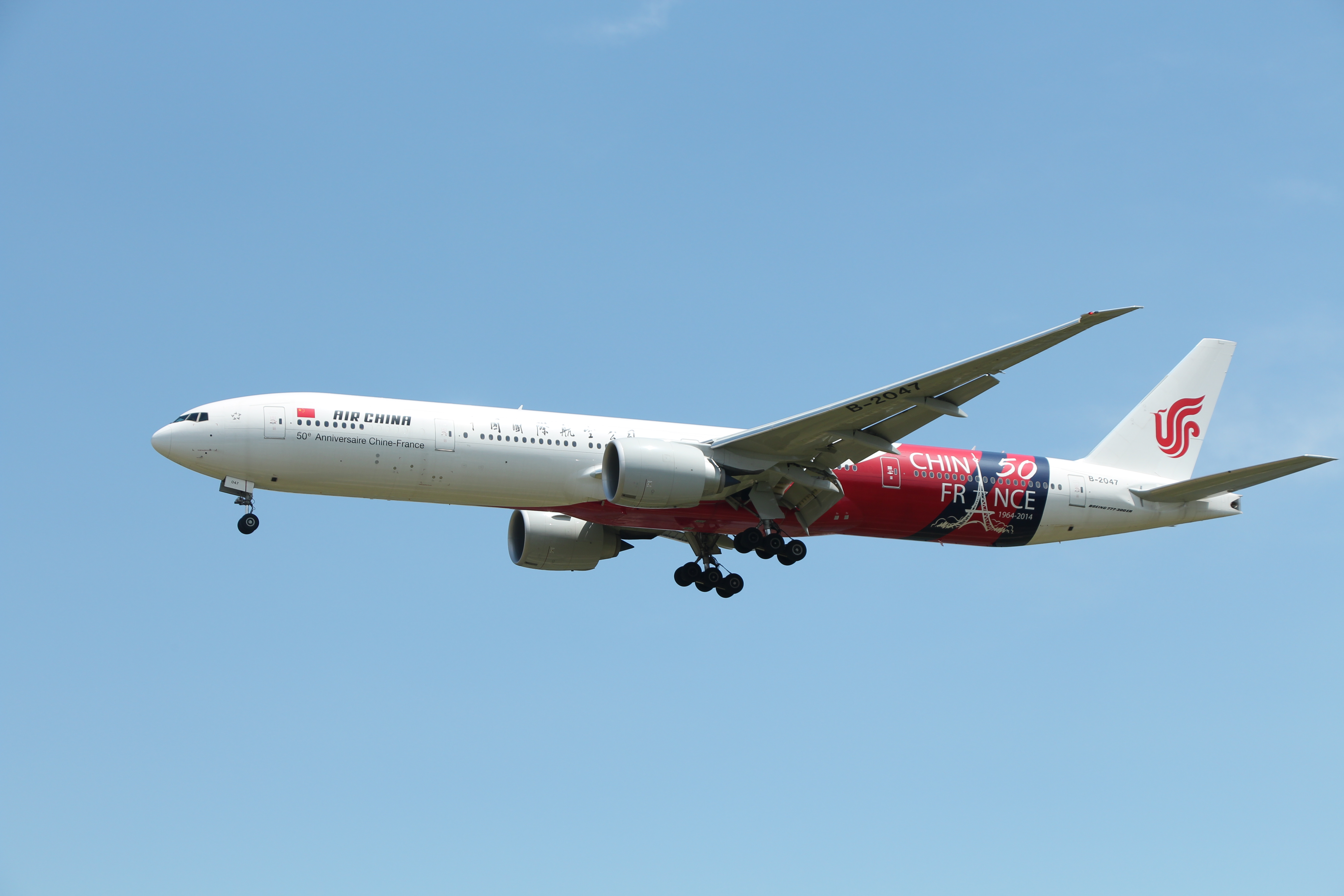
An Air China Boeing 777 in China-France 50 years anniversary livery

According to the Foreign Relations Law of the People's Republic of China, the Chinese Communist Party (CCP) leads the country's foreign policy.

Since the start of the period of reform and opening up in 1978, China has sought a higher profile in the UN through its permanent seat on the United Nations Security Council and other multilateral organizations.

China traditionally operates separate tracks of government-to-government and party-to-party relations, the latter for example via the Communist Party's International Liaison Department.

=== Asian neighbors ===
China's relations with its Asian neighbors became more stable during the last decades of the 20th century. It has cultivated a more cooperative relationship with members of the Association of Southeast Asian Nations (ASEAN), and participated in the ASEAN Regional Forum. In 1997, the ASEAN member nations and China, South Korea and Japan agreed to hold yearly talks to further strengthen regional cooperation, the ASEAN Plus Three meetings. In 2005, the "ASEAN Plus Three" countries together with India, Australia and New Zealand held the inaugural East Asia Summit (EAS). Relations have improved with Vietnam since the 1979 Sino-Vietnamese War and subsequent Sino-Vietnamese conflicts although maritime disputes remain.

A territorial dispute with its Southeast Asian neighbors over islands in the South China Sea remains unresolved, as does another dispute in the East China Sea with Japan. For the countries involved, these conflicts have had a negative impact on China's reputation.

The 2023 edition of China's "standard map" unveiled by its Ministry of Natural Resources on 28 August 2023, met with objections from its Asian neighbors the Philippines, Malaysia, Vietnam, Taiwan, and India, all of which are involved in territorial disputes with China.

=== International territorial disputes ===
China has had border or maritime disputes with several countries, including with Vietnam in the Gulf of Tonkin and with Japan. Beijing has resolved many of these disputes. Notably on 21 July 2008, Russia finally resolved the last remaining border dispute along the 4300 km border between the two countries by ceding a small amount of territory to China.

Territorial disputes with other countries below:

- The PRC claims the de jure administration of Taiwan Province, as well as mainland-nearby islands of Kinmen and Matsu Islands, currently controlled by the Republic of China.
- 10 features in the Yalu (Korean: Amnok) river are in dispute with North Korea.
- Border dispute with India; India claims control of Aksai Chin, which China seized during the Sino-Indian War of 1962, while China claims most of the Indian state of Arunachal Pradesh (called South Tibet by China).
- Portions of the Bhutan-China border.
- China claims the administration of Senkaku Islands (Diaoyutai Islands), currently held by Japan.
- South China Sea Issue (《Declaration on the Conduct of Parties in the South China Sea》 was signed by the People's Republic of China and the 10 ASEAN countries (10+1) in Phnom Penh, Cambodia on 4 November 2002)
  - Paracel Islands administered and occupied by the People's Republic, but claimed by Vietnam.
  - Involved in a dispute with the Philippines over Scarborough Shoal.
  - Involved in a complex dispute over the Spratly Islands with Malaysia, the Philippines, Vietnam, Taiwan, and possibly Brunei.
  - The maritime area in South China Sea, which China claimed sovereignty on area surrounding shoals and islands in the Sea, as well as historical right over the area in nine-dash line, while countries like the United States and Japan consider the maritime area as international water.
- Exclusive economic zone disputes with North Korea in the Yellow Sea; South Korea in the Yellow and East China Seas; Japan in the East China Sea (East China Sea EEZ disputes); Vietnam, the Philippines, Malaysia, Brunei and Indonesia in the South China Sea.

Territorial disputes listed above as between the PRC and ROC ("Taiwan") stems from the question of which government is the legitimate government of China. The Republic of China which views itself as the successor state of the Qing Dynasty did not renounce any territory which fell under de facto control of other states (i.e. Mongolia), but has largely been a non-participant in enforcing these claims. The People's Republic of China which inherited the claims has settled a number of such disputes with Mongolia and Russia via bilateral treaties, not recognized by the Republic of China. In this respect, the territorial disputes between the PRC and neighboring countries may be considered a subset of those between the ROC and said countries.

Bloomberg News reports that these disputes are undermining China's attempts to charm its neighbors away from American influence. China has come to rely more on military power to resolve these disputes. China has made double digit percentage increases in its military budget for many years, though as a percentage of its fast growing GDP falling from 1.4% in 2006 to 1.3% in 2011. This may lead to a China causing its own encirclement by nations that are ever more firmly aligned against an increasingly well armed and dominant China. As of 2013 this has caused even the Philippines to invite back onto their soil not just the Americans, but also the Japanese.

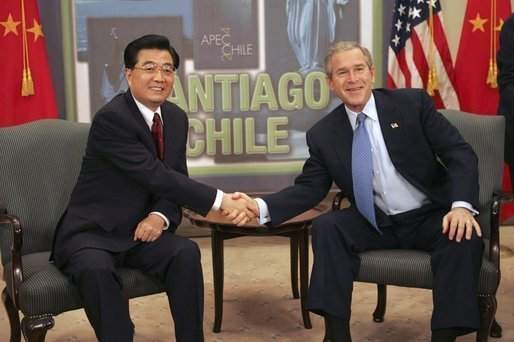
Hu Jintao of China and George W. Bush meet while attending an APEC summit in Santiago de Chile, 2004.

In March 2024, it was revealed that Japan and the European Union are set to engage in discussions regarding cooperation on advanced materials for next-generation chips and batteries, aiming to decrease their dependence on China. EU Commissioner for Innovation and Research, Iliana Ivanova, highlighted the potential mutual benefits of establishing a dialogue framework.

=== 21st century ===
At a national meeting on diplomatic work in August 2004, Chinese Communist Party (CCP) general secretary Hu Jintao reiterated that China will continue its "independent foreign policy of peaceful development," stressing the need for a peaceful and stable international environment, especially among China's neighbors, that will foster "mutually beneficial cooperation" and "common development." This policy line had varied little in intent since the People's Republic was established in 1949, but the rhetoric has varied in its stridency to reflect periods of domestic political upheaval.

In 2007, Foreign Affairs Ministry spokesman Qin Gang made an eight-point statement explaining the diplomatic philosophy of China in response to U.S. Vice President Dick Cheney's earlier remarks on China's military spending and China's anti-satellite test in January 2007 posing a global threat.

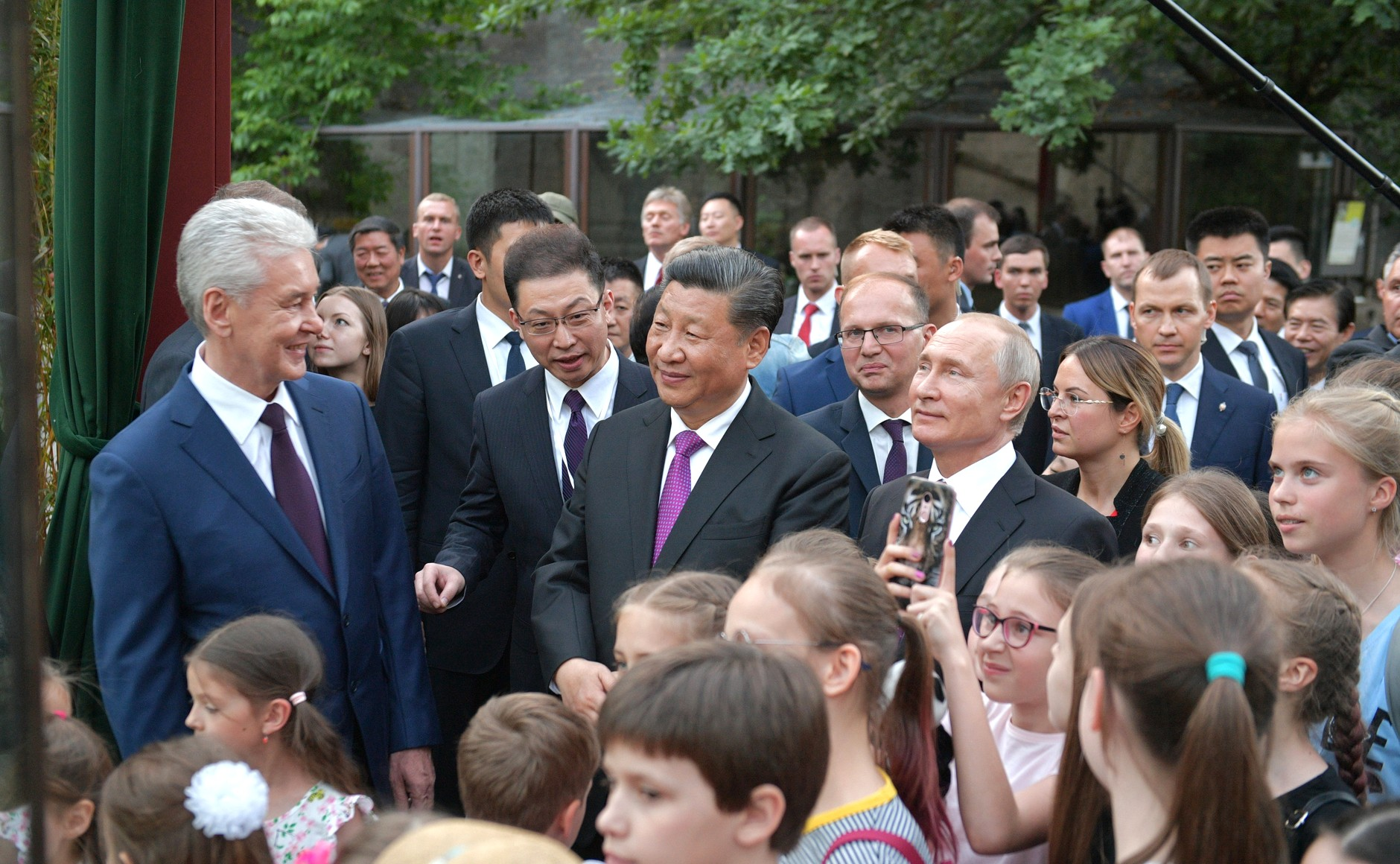
Chinese leader Xi Jinping presented two pandas to Moscow Zoo at a ceremony with Vladimir Putin on 5 June 2019.

In 2011, Foreign Minister Yang Jiechi outlined plans for an "integrated approach" that would serve China's economic development.

In 2016, during the 6th Plenum of 18th Central Committee of the Chinese Communist Party (CCP), CCP General Secretary Xi Jinping presented efforts for greater transparency in the decision-making process in local governance, which also represents his effort in establishing a positive image of China's Communist Party overseas.

At their annual meeting on 13 June 2021, country leaders from the Group of Seven (G7) criticized China for a series of abuses. The G7 nations—the US, UK, Germany, France, Italy, Canada and Japan—had been hesitant about acting separately. Pressured by US President Joe Biden, they unanimously agreed on a sharp criticism, followed by a similar strong unanimous attack by NATO members the next day. The criticisms focused on the mistreatment of the Uyghur minority, the systematic destruction of democracy in Hong Kong, repeated military threats against Taiwan, unfair trade practices, and lack of transparency regarding the origins of COVID-19. China has rejected all criticism of what it considers to be strictly internal policy matters. On the other hand, the constellation of critics is essential to the Chinese economy in terms of jobs, investments and purchases of its huge quantity of exports.

China's early success in responding to the COVID-19 pandemic facilitated its mask diplomacy. Chinese ownership of much of the global medical supply chain enhanced its ability to send doctors and medical equipment to suffering countries. China soon followed its mask diplomacy with vaccine diplomacy. China's infection rates were sufficiently low that it could send vaccines abroad without domestic objections. Academic Suisheng Zhao writes that "[j]ust by showing up and helping plug the colossal gaps in the global supply, China gained ground."

== Economic policy ==
China increased its standing as a responsible global actor during the 2008 financial crisis. When Western countries were nearing financial disaster, China created credit for spending on infrastructure. This both helped stabilize the global economy and it also provided an opportunity for China to retool its own infrastructure.

The Communist Party's Seventeenth National Congress in 2007 made the negotiation of free trade agreements a priority and was further emphasized following a 2015 State Council opinion. The pace of China's free trade agreement negotiations has accelerated since 2007.

China has invested in many infrastructure projects around Eurasia and Africa, including the Eurasian Land Bridge, Sino-Myanmar pipelines and railway and an economic corridor and a port in Pakistan.

=== Debt trap allegations ===
China financed Hambantota International Port in Sri Lanka, which drew allegations of debt-trap diplomacy when Sri Lanka defaulted on its loans and China took control of the port for 99 years. Some western analysts have suggested China's debt-trap diplomacy may hide hegemonic intentions and challenges to states' sovereignty. A 2022 study from Johns Hopkins University's China Africa Research Initiative found that contrary to popular narratives regarding Hambantota port, there were no Chinese debt-to-equity swaps, no asset seizures, and no "hidden debt." It concluded that "the popular narrative of Sri Lanka getting caught in a Chinese debt-trap has been debunked on many occasions." Numerous other academics have also argued that the notion of a Chinese "debt-trap" is false, and have called the allegation a "meme" based on anxiety about China's rise, a function of China-US rivalries rather than reality, and that such allegations of "neo-colonialism" are false or misrepresentations. As of 2021, China had not seized the Sri Lankan port or any other asset from another country.

=== Recent initiatives ===
Belt and Road Initiative China Members of the Asian Infrastructure Investment Bank The six Belt and Road corridors Maritime silk road China in red, Members of the Asian Infrastructure Investment Bank in orange, the six corridors in black China Britain Business Council: One Belt One Road

As the Trump administration in the United States opened a trade and tariff war with China in 2017, China's response has been to set up its own multinational trading arrangements. In late March 2019, Xi Jinping moved forward with major trading deals with France and Italy. French President Emmanuel Macron and Xi Jinping signed a series of large-scale trade agreements that cover many sectors over a period of years. The centerpiece was a €30 billion purchase of airplanes from Airbus. The new trade agreement also covered French exports of chicken, a French-built offshore wind farm in China, and a Franco-Chinese cooperation fund, as well as co-financing between BNP Paribas and the Bank of China. Other plans include billions of euros to be spent on modernizing Chinese factories, as well as new ship building. The same week Xi Jinping signed an infrastructure plan with Italian Prime Minister Giuseppe Conte. Italy became the first European power to join the Belt and Road Initiative.

As of fall 2023, Italy has started the process to exit the Belt and Road Initiative by not renewing the five-year Belt and Road Initiative Memorandum of Understanding (MOU) of 2019 at the end of 2023. With anticipated Italy's notice not to renew, the MOU will officially end in March 2024. Eighty percent of the 193-member United Nations have participated in the Belt and Road Initiative, and the developed Western countries have largely stayed away.

=== China–United States trade war ===
The world's two largest economies have engaged in an escalating trade war through increasing tariffs and other measures since 2018.

Lawrence J. Lau argues that a major cause is the growing battle China and the U.S. for global economic and technological dominance. He argues, "It is also a reflection of the rise of populism, isolationism, nationalism and protectionism almost everywhere in the world, including in the US."

=== RCEP ===
The Regional Comprehensive Economic Partnership (RCEP) is a free trade agreement between the Asia-Pacific nations of Australia, Brunei, Cambodia, China, Indonesia, Japan, Laos, Malaysia, Myanmar, New Zealand, the Philippines, Singapore, South Korea, Thailand, and Vietnam. The agreement covers approximately 30% of the global population and 30% of the global economy. In January 2022, RCEP became the world's largest trade bloc (in economic terms) and continues to be the world's largest as of at least early 2024.

The 2017 decision by United States President Donald Trump to withdraw from the Trans-Pacific Partnership strengthened the appeal of the RCEP.

== International treaties and organizations ==
=== International treaties ===
China has signed numerous international conventions and treaties.

Treaties signed on behalf of China before 1949 are applicable only to the Republic of China on Taiwan. Conventions signed by Beijing include: Assistance in Case of a Nuclear Accident or Radiological Emergency Convention; Biological Weapons Convention; Chemical Weapons Convention; Conventional Weapons Convention; Convention on Early Notification of a Nuclear Accident; Inhumane Weapons Convention; Nuclear Dumping Convention (London Convention); Nuclear Safety Convention; Convention on the Physical Protection of Nuclear Material; Rights of the Child and on the Sale of Children, Child Prostitution, and Child Pornography Convention (signed Optional Protocol); and Status of Refugees Convention (and the 1967 Protocol).

China also is a party to the following international environmental conventions: Antarctic-Environmental Protocol, Antarctic Treaty, Biodiversity, Climate Change, Climate Change-Kyoto Protocol, Desertification, Endangered Species, Hazardous Wastes, Law of the Sea, Marine Dumping, Ozone Layer Protection, Ship Pollution, Tropical Timber 83, Tropical Timber 94, Wetlands, and Whaling.

==== Membership in international organizations ====
China holds a permanent seat and veto power on the United Nations Security Council. Prior to 1971, the Republic of China based on the island of Taiwan held China's UN seat. On 25 October 1971, the People's Republic of China took control of the seat with the passing of UN General Assembly Resolution 2758 by a vote of 76 to 35 with 17 abstentions, with support coming from several NATO countries, the Soviet Union, and India, and a notable opponent being the United States.

China plays a leadership role in the Shanghai Cooperation Organization, a multilateral security group which aims to reduce the "three evils" of terrorism, separatism, and extremism.

China was active in the Six-party talks in an effort to end North Korea's nuclear program in the early 2000s. China hoped to play a lead role in developing the Six-Party Talks into a lasting multilateral security mechanism for northeast Asia, but ultimately the talks failed. China's efforts in the unsuccessful tasks nonetheless raised its international standing.

As of at least 2024, China has positive relationships with the World Bank and the International Monetary Fund.

== Diplomatic relations ==
List of countries which the People's Republic of China maintains diplomatic relations with:

| # | Country | Date |
|---|---|---|
| 1 | Russia | 2 October 1949 |
| 2 | Bulgaria | 4 October 1949 |
| 3 | Romania | 5 October 1949 |
| 4 | Czech Republic | 6 October 1949 |
| 5 | Hungary | 6 October 1949 |
| 6 | North Korea | 6 October 1949 |
| 7 | Poland | 7 October 1949 |
| 8 | Mongolia | 16 October 1949 |
| 9 | Albania | 23 November 1949 |
| 10 | Vietnam | 18 January 1950 |
| 11 | India | 1 April 1950 |
| 12 | Indonesia | 13 April 1950 |
| 13 | Sweden | 9 May 1950 |
| 14 | Denmark | 11 May 1950 |
| 15 | Myanmar | 8 June 1950 |
| 16 | Liechtenstein | 14 September 1950 |
| 17 | Switzerland | 14 September 1950 |
| 18 | Finland | 28 October 1950 |
| 19 | Pakistan | 21 May 1951 |
| 20 | United Kingdom | 17 June 1954 |
| 21 | Norway | 5 October 1954 |
| 22 | Netherlands | 19 November 1954 |
| 23 | Serbia | 2 January 1955 |
| 24 | Afghanistan | 20 January 1955 |
| 25 | Nepal | 1 August 1955 |
| 26 | Egypt | 30 May 1956 |
| 27 | Syria | 1 August 1956 |
| 28 | Yemen | 24 September 1956 |
| 29 | Sri Lanka | 7 February 1957 |
| 30 | Cambodia | 19 July 1958 |
| 31 | Iraq | 25 August 1958 |
| 32 | Morocco | 1 November 1958 |
| 33 | Algeria | 20 December 1958 |
| 34 | Sudan | 4 February 1959 |
| 35 | Guinea | 14 October 1959 |
| 36 | Ghana | 5 July 1960 |
| 37 | Cuba | 28 September 1960 |
| 38 | Mali | 25 October 1960 |
| 39 | Somalia | 14 December 1960 |
| 40 | Laos | 25 April 1961 |
| 41 | Tanzania | 9 December 1961 |
| 42 | Uganda | 18 October 1962 |
| 43 | Kenya | 14 December 1963 |
| 44 | Burundi | 21 December 1963 |
| 45 | Tunisia | 10 January 1964 |
| 46 | France | 27 January 1964 |
| 47 | Republic of the Congo | 22 February 1964 |
| 48 | Central African Republic | 29 September 1964 |
| 49 | Zambia | 29 October 1964 |
| 50 | Benin | 12 November 1964 |
| 51 | Mauritania | 19 July 1965 |
| 52 | Canada | 13 October 1970 |
| 53 | Equatorial Guinea | 15 October 1970 |
| 54 | Italy | 6 November 1970 |
| 55 | Ethiopia | 24 November 1970 |
| 56 | Chile | 15 December 1970 |
| 57 | Nigeria | 10 February 1971 |
| 58 | Kuwait | 22 March 1971 |
| 59 | Cameroon | 26 March 1971 |
| 60 | Austria | 28 May 1971 |
| 61 | Sierra Leone | 29 July 1971 |
| 62 | Turkey | 4 August 1971 |
| 63 | Iran | 16 August 1971 |
| 64 | Belgium | 25 October 1971 |
| 65 | Peru | 2 November 1971 |
| 66 | Lebanon | 9 November 1971 |
| 67 | Rwanda | 12 November 1971 |
| 68 | Senegal | 7 December 1971 |
| 69 | Cyprus | 14 December 1971 |
| 70 | Iceland | 14 December 1971 |
| 71 | Malta | 31 January 1972 |
| 72 | Mexico | 14 February 1972 |
| 73 | Argentina | 16 February 1972 |
| 74 | Mauritius | 15 April 1972 |
| 75 | Greece | 5 June 1972 |
| 76 | Guyana | 27 June 1972 |
| 77 | Togo | 19 September 1972 |
| 78 | Japan | 29 September 1972 |
| 79 | Germany | 11 October 1972 |
| 80 | Maldives | 14 October 1972 |
| 81 | Madagascar | 6 November 1972 |
| 82 | Luxembourg | 16 November 1972 |
| 83 | Jamaica | 21 November 1972 |
| 84 | Democratic Republic of the Congo | 24 November 1972 |
| 85 | Chad | 28 November 1972 |
| 86 | Australia | 21 December 1972 |
| 87 | New Zealand | 22 December 1972 |
| 88 | Spain | 9 March 1973 |
| 89 | Burkina Faso | 15 September 1973 |
| 90 | Guinea-Bissau | 15 March 1974 |
| 91 | Gabon | 20 April 1974 |
| 92 | Malaysia | 31 May 1974 |
| 93 | Trinidad and Tobago | 20 June 1974 |
| 94 | Venezuela | 28 June 1974 |
| 95 | Niger | 20 July 1974 |
| 96 | Brazil | 15 August 1974 |
| 97 | Gambia | 14 December 1974 |
| 98 | Botswana | 6 January 1975 |
| 99 | Philippines | 9 June 1975 |
| 100 | Mozambique | 25 June 1975 |
| 101 | Thailand | 1 July 1975 |
| 102 | São Tomé and Príncipe | 12 July 1975 |
| 103 | Bangladesh | 4 October 1975 |
| 104 | Fiji | 5 November 1975 |
| 105 | Samoa | 6 November 1975 |
| 106 | Comoros | 13 November 1975 |
| 107 | Cape Verde | 25 April 1976 |
| 108 | Suriname | 17 May 1976 |
| 109 | Seychelles | 30 June 1976 |
| 110 | Papua New Guinea | 12 October 1976 |
| 111 | Liberia | 17 February 1977 |
| 112 | Jordan | 7 April 1977 |
| 113 | Barbados | 30 May 1977 |
| 114 | Oman | 25 May 1978 |
| 115 | Libya | 9 August 1978 |
| 116 | United States | 1 January 1979 |
| 117 | Djibouti | 8 January 1979 |
| 118 | Portugal | 2 February 1979 |
| 119 | Ireland | 22 June 1979 |
| 120 | Ecuador | 2 January 1980 |
| 121 | Colombia | 7 February 1980 |
| 122 | Zimbabwe | 18 April 1980 |
| 123 | Kiribati | 25 June 1980 |
| 124 | Vanuatu | 26 March 1982 |
| 125 | Antigua and Barbuda | 1 January 1983 |
| 126 | Angola | 12 January 1983 |
| 127 | Ivory Coast | 2 March 1983 |
| 128 | Lesotho | 30 April 1983 |
| 129 | United Arab Emirates | 1 November 1984 |
| 130 | Bolivia | 9 July 1985 |
| 131 | Grenada | 1 October 1985 |
| 132 | Nicaragua | 7 December 1985 |
| — | Belize (suspended) | 6 February 1987 |
| 133 | Uruguay | 3 February 1988 |
| 134 | Qatar | 9 July 1988 |
| — | State of Palestine | 20 November 1988 |
| 135 | Bahrain | 18 April 1989 |
| 136 | Federated States of Micronesia | 11 September 1989 |
| 137 | Namibia | 22 March 1990 |
| 138 | Saudi Arabia | 21 July 1990 |
| 139 | Singapore | 3 October 1990 |
| — | Marshall Islands (suspended) | 16 November 1990 |
| 140 | San Marino | 8 June 1991 |
| 141 | Estonia | 11 September 1991 |
| 142 | Latvia | 12 September 1991 |
| 143 | Lithuania | 14 September 1991 |
| 144 | Brunei | 30 September 1991 |
| 145 | Uzbekistan | 2 January 1992 |
| 146 | Kazakhstan | 3 January 1992 |
| 147 | Tajikistan | 4 January 1992 |
| 148 | Ukraine | 4 January 1992 |
| 149 | Kyrgyzstan | 5 January 1992 |
| 150 | Turkmenistan | 6 January 1992 |
| 151 | Belarus | 20 January 1992 |
| 152 | Israel | 24 January 1992 |
| 153 | Moldova | 30 January 1992 |
| 154 | Azerbaijan | 2 April 1992 |
| 155 | Armenia | 6 April 1992 |
| 156 | Slovenia | 12 May 1992 |
| 157 | Croatia | 13 May 1992 |
| 158 | Georgia | 9 June 1992 |
| 159 | South Korea | 24 August 1992 |
| 160 | Slovakia | 1 January 1993 |
| 161 | Eritrea | 24 May 1993 |
| 162 | North Macedonia | 12 October 1993 |
| 163 | Andorra | 29 June 1994 |
| 164 | Monaco | 16 January 1995 |
| 165 | Bosnia and Herzegovina | 3 April 1995 |
| 166 | Bahamas | 23 May 1997 |
| — | Cook Islands | 25 July 1997 |
| — | Saint Lucia (suspended) | 1 September 1997 |
| 167 | South Africa | 1 January 1998 |
| 168 | Tonga | 2 November 1998 |
| 169 | Timor-Leste | 20 May 2002 |
| 170 | Nauru | 21 July 2002 |
| 171 | Dominica | 23 March 2004 |
| 172 | Montenegro | 6 July 2006 |
| 173 | Costa Rica | 1 June 2007 |
| — | Niue | 12 December 2007 |
| 174 | Malawi | 28 December 2007 |
| 175 | South Sudan | 9 July 2011 |
| 176 | Panama | 12 June 2017 |
| 177 | Dominican Republic | 1 May 2018 |
| 178 | El Salvador | 21 August 2018 |
| 179 | Solomon Islands | 21 September 2019 |
| 180 | Honduras | 26 March 2023 |

== Relations by region and country ==
Generally, the political and sociological concept of face has a significant role in Chinese diplomacy.

In its diplomacy with the Global South countries, China emphasizes the theme of promoting a more equitable world order and seeks to portray itself as an "equalizer".

=== Africa ===
(African Union) (China)

China has diplomatic relations with 53 of the 54 countries which are generally recognized in Africa. It has embassies in each of these 53 African countries, and each of those likewise have embassies in Beijing. China does not maintain relations with Eswatini, which recognizes Taiwan instead of the PRC. China also does not recognize Western Sahara, a disputed territory which is claimed and administered by Morocco.

Following the Cold War, Chinese interests evolved into more pragmatic pursuits such as trade, investment, and energy.

The Forum on China-Africa Cooperation (FOCAC) is the primary multi-lateral coordination mechanism between African countries and China. Chinese foreign aid is a significant area of interaction within FOCAC. Through FOCAC, China provides aid in the forms of debt forgiveness, aid grants, concessional loans, and interest-free loans.

In addition to the mechanism of FOCAC, China engages with subregional multilateral groups in Africa, including the Economic Community of West African States (ECOWAS) and the East African Community (EAC).

==== Diplomatic history ====
Early modern bilateral relations were mainly affected by the Cold War and the ideology of communism. The establishment of modern Sino-African relations dates back to the late 1950s when China signed the first official bilateral trade agreement with Algeria, Egypt, Guinea, Somalia, Morocco and Sudan. Zhou Enlai made a ten-country tour to Africa between December 1963 and January 1964. Zhou Enlai visited Ghana and established close relations with Kwame Nkrumah, a leader who strived for a united Africa. Relations at that time were often reflective of Chinese foreign policy in general: China "began to cultivate ties and offer[...] economic, technical and military support to African countries and liberation movements in an effort to encourage wars of national liberation and revolution as part of an international united front against both superpower". In 1965 Ben Bella was overthrown in Algeria, with a result that the Soviets gained influence in North Africa and the Middle East. Kwame Nkrumah, the most prominent leader of sub-Saharan Africa, was deposed while on a trip to China in early 1966. The new rulers shifted Ghana to the West's side of the Cold War.

China originally had close ties with the anti-apartheid and liberation movement, African National Congress (ANC), in South Africa, but as China's relations with the Soviet Union worsened and the ANC moved closer to the Soviet Union, China shifted away from the ANC towards the Pan-Africanist Congress. In the 1960s and 1970s, Beijing's interest centered on building ideological solidarity. China adopted several principles, among them supporting the independence of African countries while investing in infrastructure projects. The Somali Democratic Republic established good relations with the Soviet Union throughout the Cold War era. When Somalia sought to create a Greater Somalia, it declared war on Ethiopia, with the aid of the Soviet Union, Somalia took Ogaden in three months, but the Soviet Union shifted its support from Somalia to Ethiopia, and Ethiopia retook the Ogaden region. This angered Siad Barre, and expelled all Soviet advisors and citizens from Somalia, but Somalia maintained good relations with China, which segregated with the traditional Soviet Communism. China and Zaire shared a common goal in Central Africa, namely doing everything in their power to halt Soviet gains in the area. Accordingly, both Zaire and China covertly funneled aid to the FNLA (and later, UNITA) in order to prevent the MPLA, who were supported and augmented by Cuba, from coming to power. During the Cold War, a few smaller nations also entered in alliances with China, such as Burundi under Michel Micombero.

The political status of Taiwan has been a key political issue for the People's Republic of China (PRC). In 1971, the support of African nations was crucial in the PRC joining the United Nations (UN), taking over the seat of the ROC on Taiwan. However, while many African countries such as Algeria, Egypt and Zambia have stressed their support to the PRC's one-China policy, Eswatini maintains relations with Taipei. For the quest of a permanent UN Security Council seat for Africa, Nigeria, the most populous African country, relies on Chinese support while Egypt looks to U.S. backing.

In its relations with African countries, China has shown a willingness to grant diplomatic audiences at the highest levels to even delegations from the smaller African countries.

==== Economic relations ====
Countries which signed cooperation documents related to the Belt and Road Initiative

In 1980, the total Sino-African trade volume was US$1 billion. By 1999, it had reached US$6.5 billion. By 2005, the total Sino-African trade had reached US$39.7 billion before it jumped to US$55 billion in 2006, making China the second largest trading partner of Africa after the U.S., which had trade worth US$91 billion with African nations. China also passed the traditional African economic partner and former colonial power France, which had trade worth US$47 billion. In 2010, trade between Africa and China was worth US$114 billion and in 2011, US$166.3 billion. In the first 10 months of 2012 it was US$163.9 billion.

There are an estimated 800 Chinese corporations doing business in Africa, most of which are private companies investing in the infrastructure, energy and banking sectors. Unconditional and low-rate credit lines (rates at 1.5% over 15 years to 20 years) have taken the place of the more restricted and conditional Western loans. Since 2000, more than US$10 billion in debt owed by African nations to China has been canceled.

==== Military relations ====
Military cooperation goes back to the Cold War period when China was keen to help African liberation movements. Apart from some traditional allies such as Somalia and Tanzania, China also had military ties with non-aligned countries such as Egypt. Military equipment worth $142 million was sold to African countries between 1955 and 1977. Two decades after the collapse of the Soviet Union, military relations are now based on business interests rather than ideology.

In 2004, China deployed around 1,500 soldiers under the UN umbrella, dispatched between Liberia and the Democratic Republic of the Congo. China is also present via its military attachés; as of 2007, it has 14 attachés in 14 different African countries while there are 18 African countries who maintain their attachés in Beijing. Apart from peacemaking, China provides military training and equipment to a few countries, though this does not require military forces to be deployed.

==== Culture ====
Africa is a host of three Chinese cultural centers. The first overseas Chinese center was opened in Mauritius in 1988. Two other followed in Egypt and Benin. The Confucius Institute, which focuses on the promotion of the Chinese language and culture, has 20 centers distributed around 13 African countries.

Historically, little is known about early African immigration to China, although there is no doubt and much consensus that the human species was originally from Africa. Due to recent developments in relations, many have been relocating for better opportunities. Places dubbed 'Little Africa' and 'Chocolate city' are increasingly receiving new immigrants, mostly Nigerians. Most of the African immigrants are concentrated in the area of Guangzhou with an estimated number of 20,000. It is estimated that there are around 10,000 illegal African immigrants in China and police crackdowns have intensified since early 2009.

In contrast, early modern Chinese immigration to the African continent is slightly better documented. In 1724, a few Chinese convicts were brought as laborers to South Africa from the Dutch East Indies (modern-day Indonesia) by the Dutch Empire. In the early 19th century, another wave of immigrants came to South Africa as workers brought by the British to work in agriculture, infrastructure building and mining. In recent years, there has been an increasing presence of Chinese in Africa. Estimates vary by source though Xinhua, China's official news agency, states that there are no less than 750,000 Chinese nationals working or living in Africa. The number of Chinese illegal immigrants remains unknown.

Due to the low prices of Chinese-made weaponry and military equipment, an increasing number of African countries shifted their source of supply from traditional providers such as Russia to China. However, the selling of arms to some states accused by Western countries of war crimes, such as Sudan, have prompted criticism in the West.

==== Criticism ====
The Zimbabwean example is relevant. Relations between China and Robert Mugabe's regime in Zimbabwe have also been the focus of criticism by a few Western countries. China was accused of supplying Zimbabwe with jet fighters, vehicles and other military equipment. China declared in 2007 that it was dropping all kinds of assistance and limiting assistance to humanitarian aid. In July 2008, Chinese diplomats pressed Mugabe to hold negotiations with Zimbabwean opposition leaders, desiring to dampen international criticism over the 2008 Zimbabwean general election amidst preparation for the Beijing Olympics.

Chinese role in Africa has sparked much criticism, including accusations of neocolonialism and racial discrimination. As a response to such criticism, China issued the Nine Principles to Encourage and Standardise Enterprises' Overseas Investment, a charter and guide of conduct to Chinese companies operating abroad. Other criticism include the flooding of the African markets with low-cost Chinese-made products, thus harming the growth and the survival of local industries and businesses.

==== Relations by country ====
===== Algeria =====
(Algeria) (China)

===== Angola =====
(Angola) (China)

===== Cameroon =====
(Cameroon) (China)

===== DR Congo =====
(Democratic Republic of the Congo) (China)

===== Egypt =====
(Egypt) (China)

===== Ethiopia =====
(Ethiopia) (China)

===== Kenya =====
(Kenya) (China)

===== Morocco =====
(Morocco) (China)

===== Nigeria =====
(Nigeria) (China)

===== Somalia =====
(Somalia) (China)

===== South Africa =====
(South Africa) (China)

===== Sudan =====
(Sudan) (China)

===== Tanzania =====
(Tanzania) (China)

===== Zambia =====
(Zambia) (China)

=== Americas ===
==== Latin America and the Caribbean ====
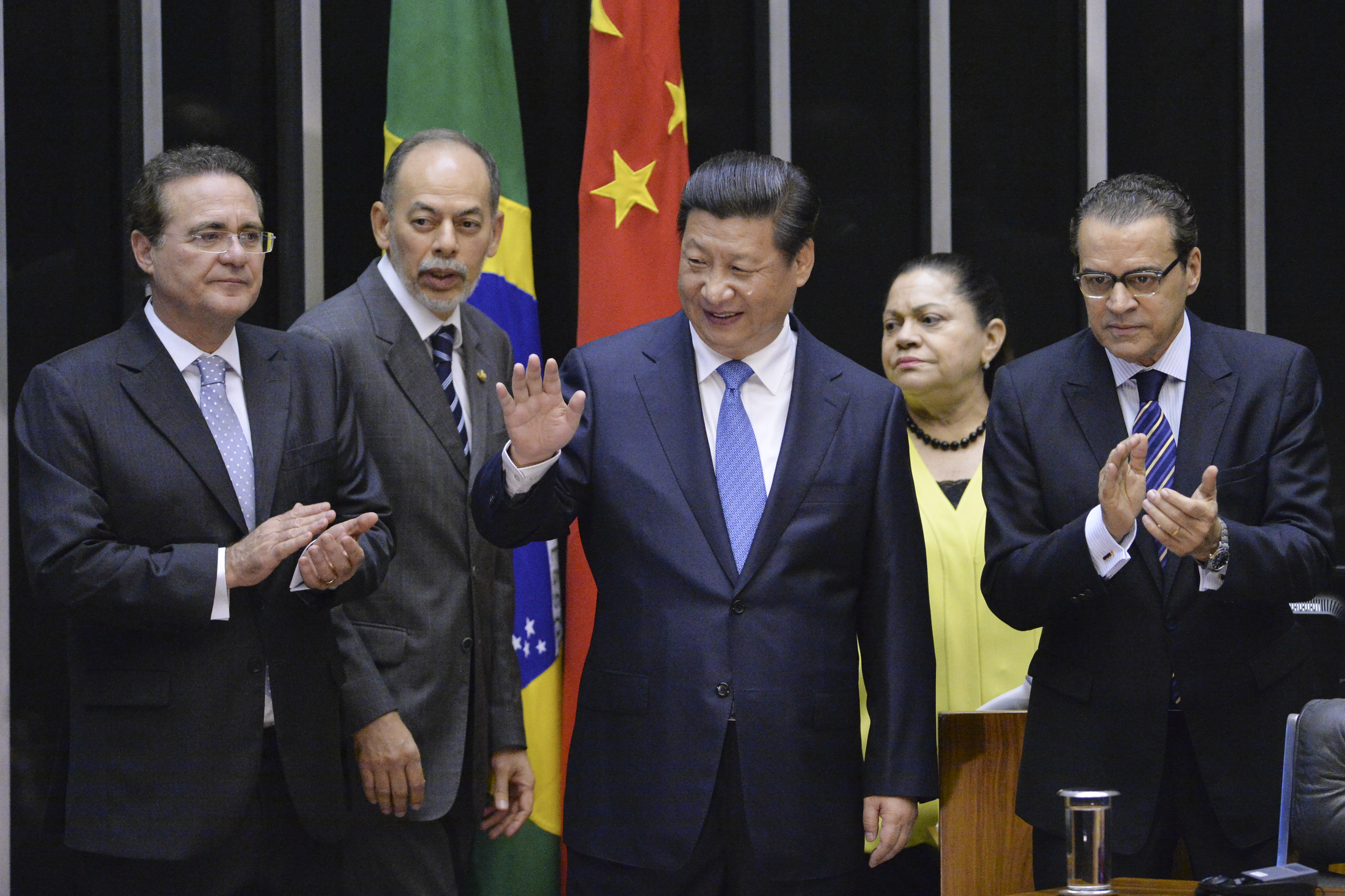
Xi Jinping delivered a speech at the National Congress of Brazil, 16 July 2014

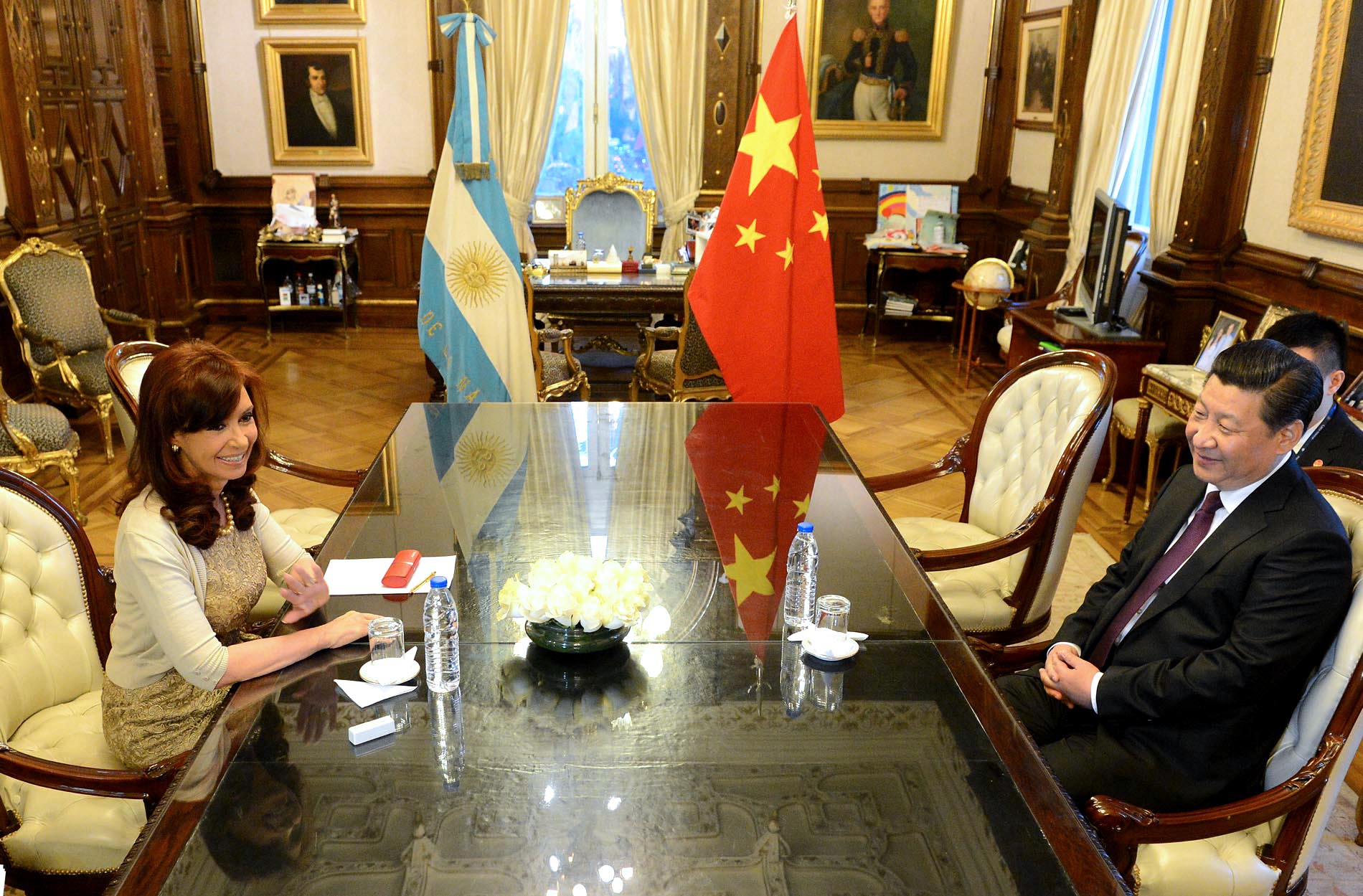
Cristina Fernández and Xi Jinping in Argentina, 18 July 2014

Recent years have seen Beijing's growing economic and political influence in South America and the Caribbean. During a visit to Brazil, Argentina, Chile, and Cuba in November 2004, Chinese leader Hu Jintao announced US$100 billion worth of investment over the next decade. For instance, Cuba is turning to Chinese companies rather than Western ones to modernize its crippled transportation system at a cost of more than US$1 billion, continuing a trend of favoring the fellow communist country that has made Beijing as Cuba's second-largest trading partner after Venezuela in 2005. In addition, China is expanding its military-to-military contacts in the region. China is training increasing numbers of Latin American and Caribbean region military personnel, mainly due to a three-year-old U.S. law surrounding the International Criminal Court that has led to a sharp decline in U.S.-run training programs for the region.

In its relations with Latin American countries, China has shown a willingness to grant diplomatic audiences at the highest levels to even delegations from the smaller Latin American countries.

===== Caribbean =====
(Caribbean Community) (China)

Caribbean regional relations with China are mostly based on trade, credits, and investments which have increased significantly since the 1990s. For many Caribbean nations the increasing ties with China have been used as a way to decrease long time over-dependence on the United States.

Additionally, China's policy in the region was the utilization of "dollar diplomacy" or the attempts to switch many nations from recognizing Taiwan as an independent nation instead to the recognition of the "One China" policy in exchange for Chinese investment.

More recently, during various visits by several Chinese diplomats to the Caribbean region a deal was signed for China to help establish the Confucius Institute at the University of the West Indies. These agreements are part of the basis of teaching Mandarin Chinese language courses at the regional University.

China has also expanded several levels of cooperation with the Caribbean region. China and the Government of the Republic of Trinidad and Tobago were said to have formed an agreement where asphalt from Trinidad and Tobago would be exported to China during its construction boom in preparation for the 2008 Summer Olympics. In exchange, China has led several construction projects in Trinidad and Tobago and the Caribbean region via Chinese owned construction companies. Trinidad and Tobago have also mooted the idea of starting direct shipments of oil and liquid natural gas direct from Trinidad and Tobago to China, to fuel the latter's growing need for resources to fuel their economy.

Several capital-works or infrastructural projects across the Caribbean region have also been financed by the Chinese government.

====== Antigua and Barbuda ======
(Antigua and Barbuda) (China)

Both countries have established diplomatic relations.

====== Barbados ======
(Barbados) (China)

Diplomatic relations between Barbados and the People's Republic of China were established on 30 May 1977. China began providing Barbados with diplomatic aide with the construction of the Sir Garfield Sobers Gymnasium (1986), and other projects such as: construction assistance for the Sir Lloyd Erskine Sandiford Centre (1994), and renovating Bridgetown's Cheapside Market building (2005). In 2005, China exported US$19.19 million worth of goods, while importing only $211,000 from Barbados.

The current Chinese Ambassador to Barbados is Xu Hong, who heads the embassy in Christ Church, Barbados. Hong replaced the former Ambassador Wei Qiang in 2012. The current Barbadian Ambassador to Beijing, China is the country's former Prime Minister Sir Lloyd Erskine Sandiford.

In 2004 Barbados obtained Approved Destination Status by the government in China. Barbados and China are members of the United Nations and the Caribbean Development Bank.

Following the 2008 Sichuan earthquake, the Barbadian prime minister visited the Chinese Embassy to personally sign the book of condolence to the nation.

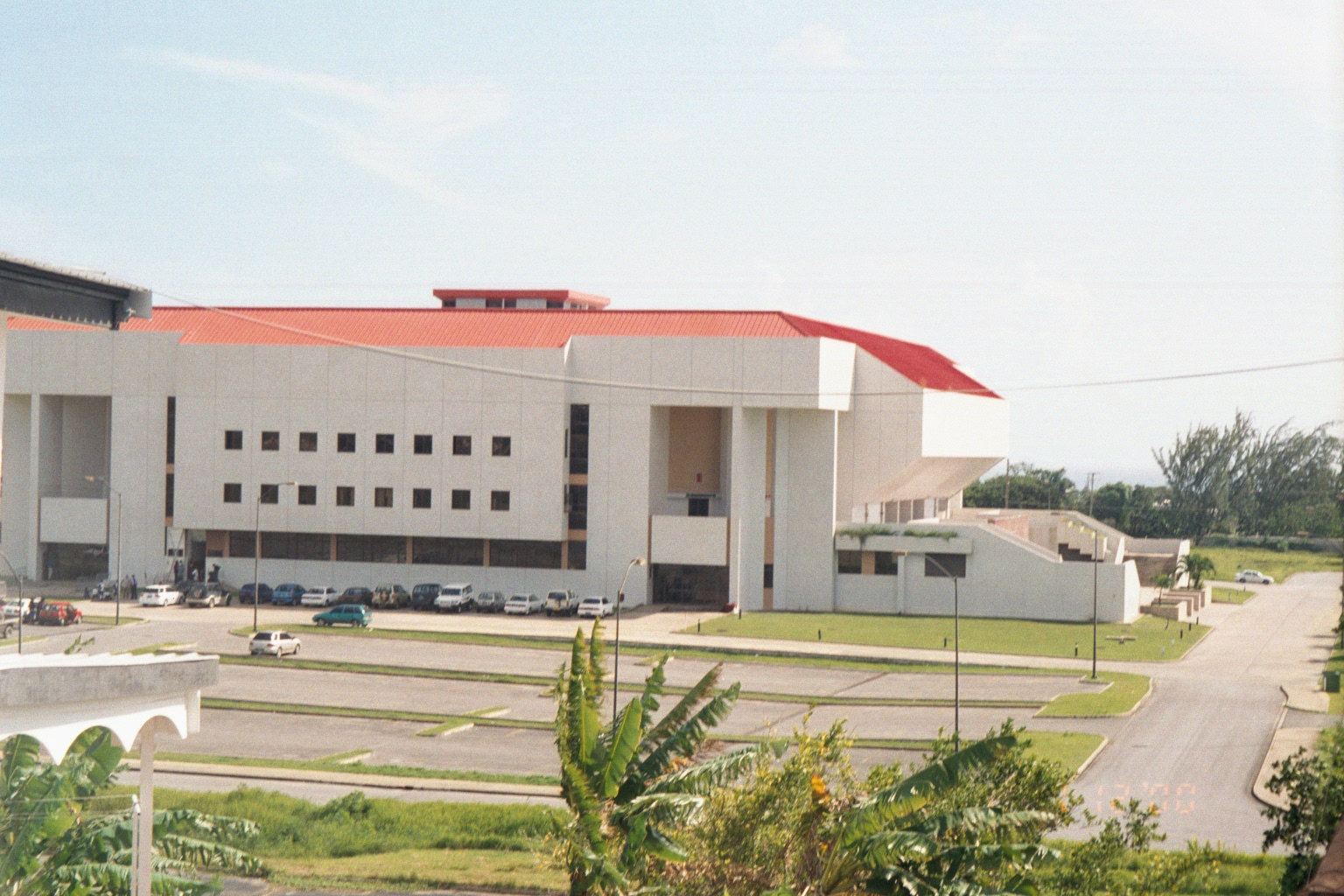
The Wildey Gymnasium in Barbados which was built in 1992 with assistance of the P.R.C.

Over the years a number of building projects have been carried out with Chinese government assistance these include: The Garfield Sobers Gymnasium, two adjustments on the Lloyd Erskine Sandiford Centre, a Home Vegetable Growing Experimental Center, embroidery, grass weaving and feather handicraft. A consideration was also giving according to the Prime Minister of Barbados, David Thompson for China to assist with the opening of a new cruise ship facility in Barbados.

Chinese Premier Wen said that China would like to join hands with Barbados in deepening cooperation in the areas of trade, tourism, architecture, and cultural exchange.

China's export volume to Barbados in 1999 reached US$2,035,000, while imports from Barbados were at US$13,000.

Both nations have additionally signed bilateral agreements including a Double taxation agreement and a Reciprocal Promotion and Protection of Investments treaty.

The Chinese government remains one of the main stakeholders in the Barbados-based Caribbean Development Bank (CDB), which lends to the various territories throughout the Caribbean region.

====== Cuba ======
(Cuba) (China)

China-Cuban relations are based on trade, credits, and investments which have increased significantly since the 1990s. China is Cuba's second largest trading partner after Venezuela. At a ceremonial trade gathering in Havana in early 2006, China's ambassador to Cuba said "Our government has a firm position to develop trade co-operation between our countries. The policy, the orientation, has been determined. What's left is the work to complete our plans."

Bilateral trade between China and Cuba in 2005 totaled US$777 million, of which US$560 million were Chinese exports to Cuba. China is sending a growing amount of durable goods to Cuba. Chinese goods have become the primary tools both in the planned revitalization of Cuban transport infrastructure and in the "Energy Revolution" of 2006 to provide electricity to the Cuban populace.

Sinopec, the Chinese state oil company, has an agreement with state-owned Cupet (Cuba Petroleum) to develop oil resources. As of mid-2008, SINOPEC had done some seismic testing for oil resources on the island of Cuba, but no drilling. The company also has a contract for joint production in one of Cuba's offshore areas of high potential yield, off the coast of Pinar del Río, but had done no off-shore drilling as of mid-2008.

In November 2005, PetroChina Great Wall Drilling Co., Ltd. and CUPET held a ceremony for the signing of two drilling service contracts. Great Wall Drilling has provided drilling rigs for oil exploration on Cuba's north coast.

====== Dominican Republic ======
(Dominican Republic) (China)

====== Jamaica ======
(Jamaica) (China)

====== Trinidad and Tobago ======
(Trinidad and Tobago) (China)

===== Central America =====
====== Costa Rica ======
(Costa Rica) (China)

====== El Salvador ======
(El Salvador) (China)

====== Honduras ======
(Honduras) (China)

====== Mexico ======
(Mexico) (China)

====== Panama ======
(Panama) (China)

===== South America =====
(South America) (China)

====== Argentina ======
(Argentina) (China)

====== Brazil ======
(Brazil) (China)

====== Chile ======
(Chile) (China)

====== Colombia ======
(Colombia) (China)

====== Peru ======
(Peru) (China)

====== Venezuela ======
(Venezuela) (China)

==== Northern America ====
===== Canada =====
(Canada) (China)

===== United States =====
(United States) (China)

Once the UN issue was resolved, relations with the United States began to thaw. In 1972, President Richard Nixon visited China. China backed away from support of North Vietnam in the Vietnam War. In late 1978, China became concerned over Vietnam's efforts to establish open control over Cambodia and Laos. In response to the Soviet-backed Vietnamese invasion of Cambodia, China fought an inconclusive border war with Vietnam (February–March 1979).

Formal diplomatic relations were established with the U.S. in 1979, and the two nations have experienced more than a quarter century of antagonistic relations over such issues as Taiwan, balance of trade, intellectual property rights, nuclear proliferation, currency intervention, securities fraud and human rights.

=== Asia ===
Generally speaking, China's relations with Central and South Asia have resulted in steadily increasing interdependence and a modestly improved regional integration.

==== Arab states ====
(Middle East and North Africa) (China)

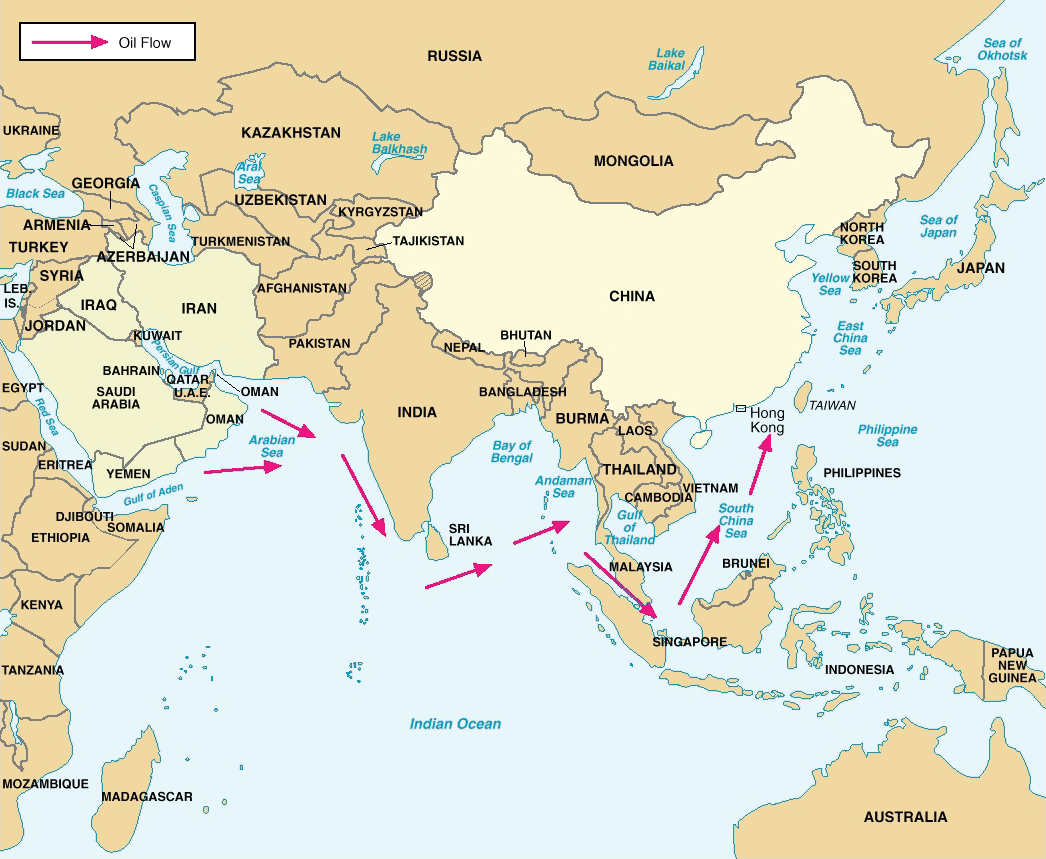
China's Critical Sea lines of communication. In 2004, over 80 percent of Chinese crude oil imports transited the Strait of Malacca, with less than 2 percent transiting the Lombok Strait.

Sino-Arab relations have extended historically back to the first Caliphate, with important trade routes, and good diplomatic relations. Following the age of Imperialism, the Sino-Arab relations were halted for several centuries, until both gained independence in the 19th and 20th century. Modern relations are evolving into a new era, with the China-Arab States Cooperation Forum (CASCF) as the major multi-lateral cooperation mechanism between China and the Arab League states.

On 10 March 2023, Saudi Arabia and Iran announced that they had agreed to normalize their relations in a deal brokered by China.

Within the first ten years of the BRI, China signed a memorandum of understanding with every Arab country. China describes this as a signal of the Arab countries' recognition of the BRI as "an important international public product and a platform for international cooperation."

===== Medieval Era =====
During the Tang dynasty, when relations with Arabs were first established, the Chinese called Arabs "Dàshí" (大食). In modern Chinese, Dashi means Great Food. The modern term for Arab is "Ālābó" (阿拉伯).

The Arab Islamic Caliph Uthman Ibn Affan (r. 644–656) sent an embassy to the Tang court at Chang'an.

Although the Tang Dynasty and the Abbasid Caliphate had fought at Talas, on 11 June 758, an Abbasid embassy arrived at Chang'an simultaneously with the Uyghurs in order to pay tribute.

The Caliphate was called "Dàshíguó" (大食國).

An Arab envoy presented horses and a girdle to the Chinese in 713, but he refused to pay homage to the Emperor, said, he said "In my country we only bow to God never to a Prince". The first thing the court was going to do was to murder the envoy, however, a minister intervened, saying "a difference in the court etiquette of foreign countries ought not to be considered a crime." A second Arab envoy performed the required rituals and paid homage to the Emperor in 726 A.D. He was gifted with a "purple robe and a girdle".

There was a controversy between the Arab ambassadors and Uyghur Khaganate ambassadors over who should go first into the Chinese court, they were then guided by the Master of Ceremonies into two different entrances. Three Da shi ambassadors arrived at the Tang court in 198 A.D. A war which was raging between the Arabs and Tibetans from 785 to 804 benefited the Chinese.

According to Professor Samy S. Swayd, Fatimid missionaries made their Dawah in China during the reign of Al-Aziz Billah.

===== Trade =====
In Islamic times Muslims from Arabia traded with China. For instance, China imported frankincense from southern Arabia via Srivijaya.

===== 20th century =====
China under the Kuomintang had established relations with Egypt and Saudi Arabia in the 1930s. The Chinese government sponsored students like Wang Jingzhai and Muhammad Ma Jian to go the Al-Azhar University to study. Pilgrims also made the Hajj to Mecca from China. Chinese Muslims were sent to Saudi Arabia and Egypt to denounce the Japanese during the Second Sino-Japanese War. The Fuad Muslim Library in China was named after King Fuad I of Egypt by the Chinese Muslim Ma Songting. In 1939 Isa Yusuf Alptekin and Ma Fuliang were sent by the Kuomintang to Middle Eastern countries such as Egypt, Turkey, and Syria to gain support during the Second Sino-Japanese War.

The Egyptian president Gamal Abdel Nasser cut off diplomatic relations with the Republic of China and established ties with the People's Republic of China in 1956. China accelerated its programme of fostering diplomatic relations throughout the Middle East from 1977 onwards as the country took a more pragmatic approach to geopolitics. In 1990, Saudi Arabia decided to cut ties with the ROC, with which it had maintained a formal relationship since 1944 (making it Taiwan's longest-standing partner in the Arab world). With the Saudi move, all Arab states had come to recognize the People's Republic of China as the legitimate Chinese government.

The relations between China and the Arab League as an organization officially started in 1956. However, it was in 1993, when the Arab League opened its first office in China, that former Secretary General Essmat Abdel Megeed went to an official visit to Beijing. In 1996, the Chinese leader Jiang Zemin visited the Arab League headquarters during his passage in Cairo, becoming the first Chinese leader to be hosted by the organization. China has continued to pay greater attention to the Middle East since the 2000s. With China, Middle Eastern countries benefit from a potential investment source and long-term buyer of oil and gas without the political complications that come with dealing with the United States.

After the Arab Spring, the consensus of Chinese foreign policymakers and academics was that China should be more actively involved in the region's security mechanisms to better safeguard Chinese expats and commercial interests in the region.

===== China-Arab States Cooperation Forum =====
The core political norms that China advocates within CASCF are its Five Principles of Peaceful Coexistence: mutual respect for territory and sovereignty, mutual nonaggression, mutual noninterference in internal affairs, equality and mutual benefit, and peaceful co-existence. These principles are a conservative interpretation of the Westphalian norms of state sovereignty.

The most prominent political issue advocated through CASCF is a Middle East peace process aimed at resolving the Arab-Israeli conflict (including the territorial disputes that Lebanon and Syria each have with Israel). Other issues which have emerged following the Arab Spring include the Syrian civil war, and issues in Iraq, Libya, Yemen, Sudan, and Somalia. In recent years, CASCF documents have noted Arab states' support for China's approach in Hong Kong.

In the opening ceremony of the Forum in 2004, Chinese foreign minister Li Zhaoxing said that the Arab world is an important force in the international arena, and that China and Arab countries enjoy a time-honored friendship, remarking "Similar histories, common objectives and wide-ranging shared interests have enabled the two sides to strengthen cooperation," he said. "No matter how the international situation changes, China has always been the sincere friend of the Arab world."

"The PRC has submitted four proposals. First, maintaining mutual respect, equitable treatment and sincere cooperation on the political front. Second, promoting economic and trade ties through cooperation in investment, trade, contracted projects, labor service, energy, transportation, telecommunications, agriculture, environmental protection and information. Third, expanding cultural exchanges. Finally, conducting personnel training," he said. Arab foreign ministers attending the meeting agreed that the formal inauguration of the forum was a significant event in the history of Arab ties with China. They submitted a variety of proposals on promoting Sino-Arab friendship and cooperation. At the conclusion of the meeting, Li and Arab League Secretary General Amr Moussa signed a declaration and an action plan for the forum. Li arrived in Cairo on Sunday evening for a three-day visit to Egypt, the last leg of a Middle East tour that has taken him to Saudi Arabia, Yemen and Oman.

===== The Joint Communiqué =====
One of the major Joint Projects involves the Environment, the AL and PRC signed the Executive Program of the Joint Communiqué between the Environmental Cooperation for 2008–2009

The League of Arab States and the Government of People's Republic of China signed the Joint Communiqué on Environmental Cooperation (referred to as the Joint Communiqué) on 1 June 2006. The Joint Communiqué is an important instrument that aims to deepen the regional environmental partnership between the two parties. Since the signing of the Joint Communiqué, the Chinese Ministry of Commerce and the Chinese Ministry of Environmental Protection have co-organized two environmental protection training courses in June 2006 and June 2007 respectively, in China.

This treaty was signed by Arab Ambassador Ahmed Benhelli Under secretary general Am Moussa's Approval, and Xu Qinghua Director General Department for International Cooperation, Ministry of Environmental Protection.

==== Central Asia ====
After the dissolution of the Soviet Union, the newly independent Central Asian countries inherited the border disagreements with China, which had themselves been inherited from czarist Russia and the Qing dynasty. In the years after the independence of the Central Asian countries, China negotiated bilaterally to resolve its borders with them individually. Ultimately, China obtained territory significantly less than it had originally claimed. Resolution of these disputes on territorial terms generally favorable to the Central Asian countries created goodwill for China, avoided conflict, and also resulted in recognition that the czarist era borders were imposed unjustly on China.

Access to energy and natural resources are important priorities for China in its Central Asian relations. China is one of the main energy partners of the Central Asian countries. Chinese oil companies have invested into Kazakh oil fields, China and Kazakhstan have constructed an oil pipeline from Kazakhstan to China and are planning to construct a natural gas pipeline. In Tajikistan and Kyrgyzstan, China has invested in hydroelectric projects.

China also seeks to improve land connections with Eurasia through its relations with the Central Asian countries. CCP General Secretary Xi Jinping has called China's efforts to build trade links that extend through Central Asia to the Middle East a New Silk Road. In addition to bolstering trade ties, Beijing has contributed aid and funding to the region's countries.

The Shanghai Cooperation Organisation, of which China is a founding member, is also becoming increasingly important in Central Asian security and politics. Many observers believe that beyond fostering good-neighborly relations, China is also concerned with securing its borders as it emerges as a world power. The terrorist attacks of 11 September changed China's view of Central Asia, causing China to pay increasing attention to potential concerns of terrorism, separatism, and extremism arising from the region. One of China's main interests in Central Asia therefore is stability in Xinjiang, which shares a border with three Central Asian countries. The Central Asian countries cooperate with China in suppressing support for separatist groups like the East Turkestan Islamic Movement. Following the invasion of Afghanistan by the United States and the increased involvement of Russia in the region, China's foreign policy makers began to view the Central Asia as both an area for cooperation and competition between major powers.

China plus Central Asia (also depicted as China + Central Asia; C+C5) is a meeting of the Foreign Ministers' of China and Kazakhstan, Kyrgyzstan, Tajikistan, Turkmenistan, Uzbekistan. It was started in 2020. In 2023, Xi Jinping and leaders of the five Central Asian countries held the China-Central Asia Summit in Xi'an, and the summit resulted in 54 agreements, 19 new cooperation mechanisms and platforms, and nine multilateral documents.

From the perspective of the Central Asian countries, China is a more predictable and reliable regional power than Russia and relations with China as an alternative power in the region provide the Central Asian countries with additional leverage in their relations with Russia.

===== Kazakhstan =====
(Kazakhstan) (China)

===== Kyrgyzstan =====
(Kyrgyzstan) (China)

===== Tajikistan =====
(Tajikistan) (China)

===== Turkmenistan =====
(Turkmenistan) (China)

===== Uzbekistan =====
(Uzbekistan) (China)

==== East Asia ====
As of 2022, the general trend is that China and the other East Asian countries have increased their ties with each other, especially in economic matters and in conducting joint military exercises. Trade with China comprised 39% of all East Asia regional trade as of 2020.

===== Japan =====
(Japan) (China)

Having fought two wars against Japan (1894–95 and 1937–45), China's long-standing concern about the level of Japan's military strength surfaces periodically, and criticism of Japan's refusal to present a full version of the atrocities of World War II in its textbooks is a perennial issue. The relationship between China and Japan has been strained at times by Japan's refusal to acknowledge its wartime past to the satisfaction of China. Revisionist comments made by prominent Japanese officials and some Japanese history textbooks regarding the 1937 Nanjing Massacre have been a focus of particular controversy. Sino-Japanese relations warmed considerably after Shinzō Abe became the Prime Minister of Japan in September 2006, and a joint historical study conducted by China and Japan released a report in 2010 which pointed toward a new consensus on the issue of Japanese war crimes. However, in the early 2010s, relations cooled once more, with Japan accusing China of withholding its reserves of valuable rare earth elements.

===== Korea =====
(Korea) (China)

====== North Korea ======
(North Korea) (China)

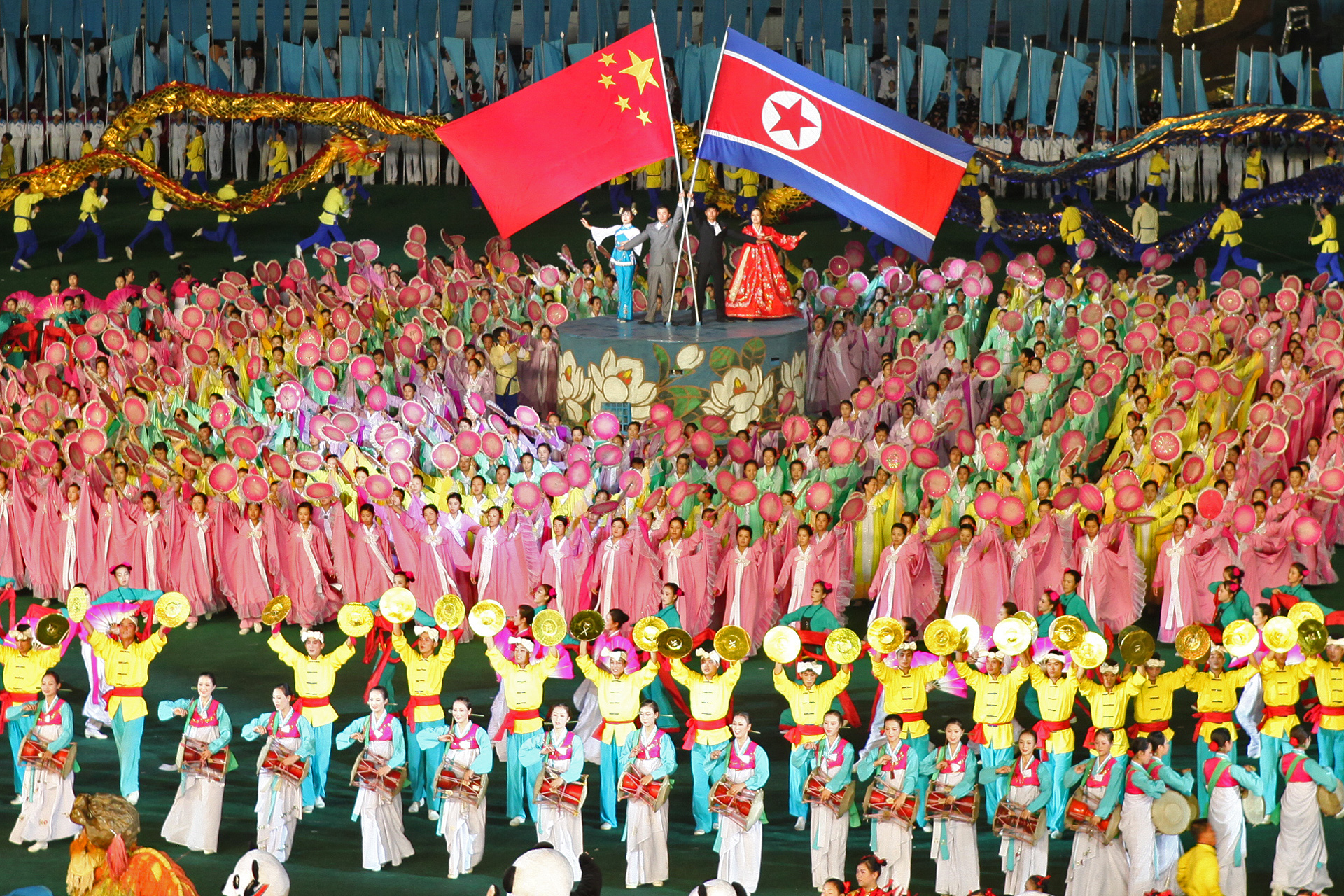
The close China-DPRK relationship is celebrated at the Mass Games in Pyongyang, 2010

China had long been a close ally of North Korea but also found a valuable trading partner in South Korea and eventually took a role in the early 2000s as a proponent of "six-party talks" (North Korea, South Korea, Russia, Japan, the U.S., and China) to resolve tensions on the Korean Peninsula. China was instrumental at brokering talks with North Korea over its nuclear program, and in 2003, there was a concerted effort by China to improve relations with the ASEAN countries and form a common East Asian market. These foreign policy efforts have been part of a general foreign policy initiative known as China's peaceful rise. On 15 November 2005, Hu Jintao visited Seoul and spoke of the importance of both countries' contributions for regional peace and cooperation in economic development. Hu's critics say that his government was overly aggressive in asserting its new power, overestimated its reach, and raised the ire of the United States and its allies who are close in proximity to China, such as India, and Japan.

====== South Korea ======
(South Korea) (China)

Diplomatic relations between the People's Republic of China and South Korea were formally established on 24 August 1992. Throughout the 1950s, 1960s, 1970s, and 1980s the PRC recognized only North Korea while South Korea in turn recognized only the Republic of China in Taiwan. South Korea was the last Asian country to establish relations with the People's Republic of China. In recent years, China and South Korea have endeavored to boost their strategic and cooperative partnership in numerous sectors, as well as promoting high level relationship. Trade, tourism and multiculturalism, in specific, have been the most important factors of strengthening two neighbouring countries cooperative partnership.

While the dispute of THAAD had initiated conflicts between the two countries in various sectors, at the end of October 2017, the two countries ended the 1-year-long diplomatic dispute and have been working swiftly to get their relationship back on track since, strengthening exchanges and cooperation between each other, creating harmony of interests, and agreed to resume exchanges and cooperation in all areas. All economic and cultural bans from China towards South Korea were also lifted as a result, with political and security cooperation, businesses and cultural exchanges between the two countries getting back to healthy state.

Upon resumption of relationship, China and South Korea have been organizing presidential and governmental visits, working together on the Korean Peninsula, assisting with the development of other countries, and cooperating in numerous areas.

==== Middle East ====
In 2016, Xi Jinping stated that China would take a "Three Nos" position towards the Middle East: (1) not seeking proxies, (2) not seeking spheres of influence, and (3) not seeking to fill a power vacuum.

China proposes "peace through development" in the Middle East, an approach that Xi articulated during a visit to Arab League headquarters. This approach proposes that sustainable peace in the Middle East requires comprehensive development initiatives. Chinese narratives of peace through development in the Middle East cite the fact that attempts by outside actors to create prosperity through the development of democratic institutions in Iraq and Afghanistan failed.

China frames its economic cooperation with the Middle East countries as part of South-South cooperation. It seeks to differentiate its economic cooperation from that of Western powers by emphasizing China's lack of political conditionality in its economic cooperation with the region. Among the platforms for development of economic ties is the annual China-Arab States Expo in Yinchuan.

===== Iran =====
(Iran) (China)

===== Turkey =====
(Turkey) (China)

==== South Asia ====
China's current trade volume with all South Asian nations reaches close to $187.554 billion a year.

Beijing runs trade surpluses with many partners, including Pakistan, Bangladesh, Nepal and Sri Lanka. Fast on the heels of the U.S. offer of nuclear power plants to India, Chinese Authorities have helped Pakistan establish nuclear power plants of its own to meet its nuclear needs, which officially consist primarily of energy requirements, although, as per certain perspectives, this could be used for Pakistani and Chinese military, quite possibly defence, purposes. China also lends to and invests in South Asian nations with low-cost financial capital, to help their development sector, especially with the current economically struggling countries of Bangladesh, Sri Lanka, and Nepal

===== Bangladesh =====
(Bangladesh) (China)

Early relations with the People's Republic of China were cold due to China's veto at the United Nations Security Council to block Bangladesh's accession to the United Nations. Lately however China has made efforts to improve relations with many of its neighbors. Trade with China reached a record level in 2006 of $3.2 billion under the auspices of the Asia-Pacific Trade Agreement (AFTA). The trade balance between the two countries are in China's favor. China has also officially agreed to helping Bangladesh on developing their nuclear power plant. Bangladesh has also signed the Apsco convention with six other nations to form a pact with China on space exploration. Defense and trade ties between the two countries have been strong, with 72% of military arms purchased by Bangladesh from 2019 to 2023 coming from China.

In June 2014, Bangladesh and China announced a Chinese Economic Zone in Anwara, Chattogram, but progress has stalled for over a decade due to unresolved commercial and contractual disputes with Chinese developers.

===== India =====
(India) (China)

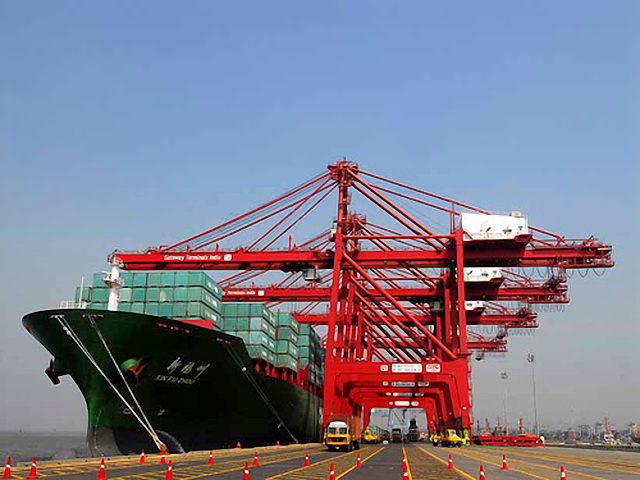
A Chinese container ship unloads cargo at the Jawaharlal Nehru Port in India. Bilateral trade between the two countries surpassed US$60 billion by 2010 making China the single largest trading partner of India.

Despite lingering suspicions remaining from the 1962 Sino-Indian War, 1967 Nathu La and Cho La clashes and continuing boundary disputes over Ladakh, Aksai Chin and Arunachal Pradesh, Sino-Indian relations have improved gradually since 1988. Both countries have sought to reduce tensions along the frontier, expand trade and cultural ties, and normalize relations.

A series of high-level visits between the two nations have helped improve relations. In December 1996, General Secretary Jiang Zemin visited India during a tour of South Asia. While in New Delhi, he signed with the Indian Prime Minister a series of confidence-building measures for the disputed borders. Sino-Indian relations suffered a brief setback in May 1998 when the Indian Defence minister justified the country's nuclear tests by citing potential threats from China. However, in June 1999, during the Kargil crisis, then-External Affairs Minister Jaswant Singh visited Beijing and stated that India did not consider China a threat. By 2001, relations between China and India were on the mend, and the two sides handled the move from Tibet to India of the 17th Karmapa in January 2000 with delicacy and tact.

Since 2004, the economic rise of both China and India has also helped forge closer relations between the two. Sino-Indian trade reached US$36 billion in 2007, making China the single largest trading partner of India. The increasing economic reliance between China and India has also brought the two nations closer politically, with both China and India eager to resolve their boundary dispute. They have also collaborated on several issues ranging from WTO's Doha round in 2008 to regional free trade agreement. Similar to Indo-US nuclear deal, China and India have also agreed to cooperate in the field of civilian nuclear energy. However, China's economic interests have clashed with those of India. Both the countries are the largest investors in Africa and have competed for control over its large natural resources. China and India agreed to take bilateral trade up to US$100 billion on a recent visit by Wen Jiabao to India.

After years of competition, general distrust between the two, and several border conflicts, relations in the 21st century between the world's two most populous states stabilized, only for relations to suffer a massive hit in the late 2010s due to multiple border standoffs that resulted in deaths on both sides. While both countries have doubled their economic trade in the past few years, and China became India's largest trading partner in 2010, there is increasing unease in India regarding the perceived Chinese advantage in their trade relationship. The two countries are planning to host joint naval exercises. The dispute over Aksai Chin (formerly a part of the Indian territory of Ladakh) and South Tibet (China) or Arunachal Pradesh (India) is not settled and plagues Sino-Indian relations. While New Delhi has raised objections to Chinese military-aid to arch-rival Pakistan and neighboring Bangladesh, Beijing similarly objects to India's growing military collaboration with Japan, Australia and the U.S.

Bilateral relations between the two became strained due to the 2017 Doklam standoff and then later by the 2020–2021 China–India skirmishes. Relations were further strained by the COVID-19 pandemic.

===== Pakistan =====
(Pakistan) (China)

Pakistan and China have enjoyed strong relations, which encompass military, economic and diplomatic ties, since the 1960s. UK scholar Nasser Amin considers the Sino-Pak entente to be a special kind of relationship in the post-war global system, since there are no natural ties or affinities of culture, religion or ideology that have existed between Islamabad and Beijing; rather, the close relationship appears to substantiate a fundamental premise of the Neo-Realist school of IR thought: namely, that states join in alliance with other states on the basis of power considerations, in this case a shared hostility to India.

The China–Pakistan Economic Corridor (CPEC) is a collection of infrastructure projects that are currently under construction throughout Pakistan. CPEC is intended to rapidly modernize Pakistani infrastructure and strengthen its economy by the construction of modern transportation networks, numerous energy projects, and special economic zones. The CPEC will connect Pakistan with China and the Central Asian countries with highway connecting Kashgar to Khunjerab and Gwadar. More recently, China has signed several free trade agreements with Pakistan as well as several bilateral trade agreements such as the Early Harvest Agreement and the establishment of a duty-free export zone (Sust Dry Port) in Pakistan's Gilgit-Baltistan. China continues to invest heavily into Pakistan, and is providing assistance in the development of Gwadar Port – the country's 3rd most major port, timber transhipments from Mozambique, as well as improving infrastructure and the development of a pipeline from the said port towards China's western regions. Trade and goodwill between Pakistan and China are relatively strong due to the bordered Muslims area of Xinjiang, who used Pakistan as a transit to Mecca/Makkah for pilgrimage. Pakistani students often go to China to study while Chinese workers come to Pakistan to work on infrastructure projects. Pakistan ceded a portion of Kashmir in the 1960s. They also share the Karakoram Highway, one of the highest paved roads in the world. Pakistani and Chinese authorities collaborated on everything from nuclear and space technology where help was provided by China to Pakistan, to cruise missile and naval technology.

===== Sri Lanka =====
(Sri Lanka) (China)

==== Southeast Asia ====
(ASEAN) (China)

China's geopolitical ambitions focus on Southeast Asia, where Beijing is intent upon establishing a preeminent sphere of influence. China has pursued this ambition with a diplomatic campaign designed to bind the region to China – politically, economically, and militarily. China's transformation into a major economic power in the 21st century has led to an increase of foreign investments in the bamboo network, a network of overseas Chinese businesses operating in the markets of Southeast Asia that share common family and cultural ties.

Historically, China's relations with the region has been uneasy, due to the country's involvement with the Vietnam War, the Malayan Communist Party during the first and second communist insurgencies in Malaysia, as well as the Communist Party of Indonesia and 30 September Movement in Indonesia. As a result, previously friendly relations with Indonesia under the Sukarno government broke off in 1967, and were not restored until 1990, while diplomatic relations with Malaysia were not established until 1974 and in 2015 Malaysia reached a status of comprehensive strategic partnership with China. China's invasion of Vietnam resulted in the Sino-Vietnamese War and other border conflicts; this war caused long-lasting animosity within Vietnam against China. Relations between the two states were only normalized in 1991 as Vietnam's closest ally, the Soviet Union, collapsed. Today, Vietnam and China have a healthy trade relationship, though tensions persist over the countries' boundaries in the South China Sea, among other disputes. Despite China's support of the Pol Pot's Khmer Rouge regime in Cambodia, which lasted long after its deposition, China enjoys a harmonious relationship with Cambodia. This relationship includes strong military and economic ties, with Cambodia defending China on the global stage; Cambodia's government has weak popular support, opening it to coercion by the Chinese government. China's relationship with Singapore is good, and the latter is one of only three countries that can enjoy visa-free entry to the country, starting 17 April 2011.

China is the largest trading partner of nearly all the Southeast Asian countries and one of the region's main sources of foreign direct investment. Over the course of 2008 to 2009, China became the largest trading partner of ASEAN.

===== Cambodia =====
(Cambodia) (China)

===== Indonesia =====
(Indonesia) (China)

===== Malaysia =====
(Malaysia) (China)

===== Myanmar =====
(Myanmar) (China)

China has had a close relationship with Myanmar, which involves support for its ruling government as well as for certain ethnic rebel groups during its ongoing civil war.

===== Philippines =====
(Philippines) (China)

===== Singapore =====
(Singapore) (China)

===== Thailand =====
(Thailand) (China)

===== Vietnam =====
(Vietnam) (China)

=== Europe ===
(Europe) (China)

Relations with Europe, both Eastern and Western, were generally friendly in the early 21st century, with close political and trade relations with the European Union nations being a major thrust of China's foreign policy in the 2000s.

China's relationship with the Central and Eastern European Countries was generally limited during the Cold War period due to the Sino-Soviet Split and the Warsaw Pact membership of these countries. Following the dissolution of the Soviet Union, these countries distanced themselves from their communist pasts and oriented towards the European Union. China's interest in Central and Eastern Europe has grown since most of those countries joined the European Union in 2004 because of the Chinese view that partnering with those countries would help Chinese economic integration with Europe more broadly. After the 2008 financial crisis caused capital investment by traditional European economic powers to fall, China established a significant presence in Central European and Eastern European markets. Cooperation further increased following the institution of the 16+1 mechanism in 2012. Generally, China's foreign relations are weaker in Central and Eastern Europe than other developing regions.

In the late 2010s, Europe took a more cautioned approach towards China, referring to the country as a "systemic rival" beginning in 2019. The Comprehensive Agreement on Investment, an investment agreement first proposed in 2013 and completed in 2020, was halted before its ratification after the European Commission announced plans in 2021 to reduce dependence on China in strategic areas of the economy.

The European Union has been China's most reliable partner with regard to clean energy and addressing climate change.

==== Albania ====
(Albania) (China)

==== Finland ====
(Finland) (China)

- China has an embassy in Helsinki.
- Finland has an embassy in Beijing and consulates-general in Hong Kong and Shanghai.

==== France ====
(France) (China)

==== Germany ====
(Germany) (China)

==== Greece ====
(Greece) (China)

==== Hungary ====
(Hungary) (China)

==== Italy ====
(Italy) (China)

In March 2019, during Chinese leader Xi Jinping's visit to Italy, China signed a memorandum of understanding on China's Belt and Road Initiative (BRI) with Italy. Additionally, with this memorandum, Italy became the only G7 country to join the BRI.

==== Russia ====
(Russia) (China)

The end of the long-held animosity between Moscow and Beijing was marked by the visit to China by Soviet General Secretary Mikhail Gorbachev in 1989. After the 1991 demise of the Soviet Union, China's relations with Russia and the former states of the Soviet Union became more amicable as the conflicting ideologies of the two vast nations no longer stood in the way. A new round of bilateral agreements was signed during reciprocal head of state visits. As in the early 1950s with the Soviet Union, Russia has again become an important source of military technology for China, as well as for raw materials and trade. Friendly relations with Russia have been an important advantage for China, offsetting its often uneasy relations with the U.S.

==== Serbia ====
(Serbia) (China)

==== Spain ====
(Spain) (China)

==== Ukraine ====
(Ukraine) (China)

As a part of the Soviet Union, Ukraine recognized the PRC in October 1949. After Ukraine gained independence from the Soviet Union in 1991, the two countries built formal diplomatic relations in 1992, and declared a strategic partnership in 2011.

During the 2022 Russian invasion of Ukraine, China abstained in the related UN Security Council votes condemning Russia. The Ukrainian embassy issued a statement in Chinese condemning Russia on Weibo, which drew over 300 million views in a day. Chinese company NetEase has published anti-war videos from Chinese in Ukraine and Ukrainians in China. However, Beijing's failure to criticise Russia increased local hostility towards stranded Chinese in Ukraine.

In September 2022, Li Zhanshu, the third highest-ranking member of the CCP Politburo Standing Committee, told a group of Russian legislators that the Chinese government "understands and supports Russia...on the situation in Ukraine".

==== United Kingdom ====
(United Kingdom) (China)

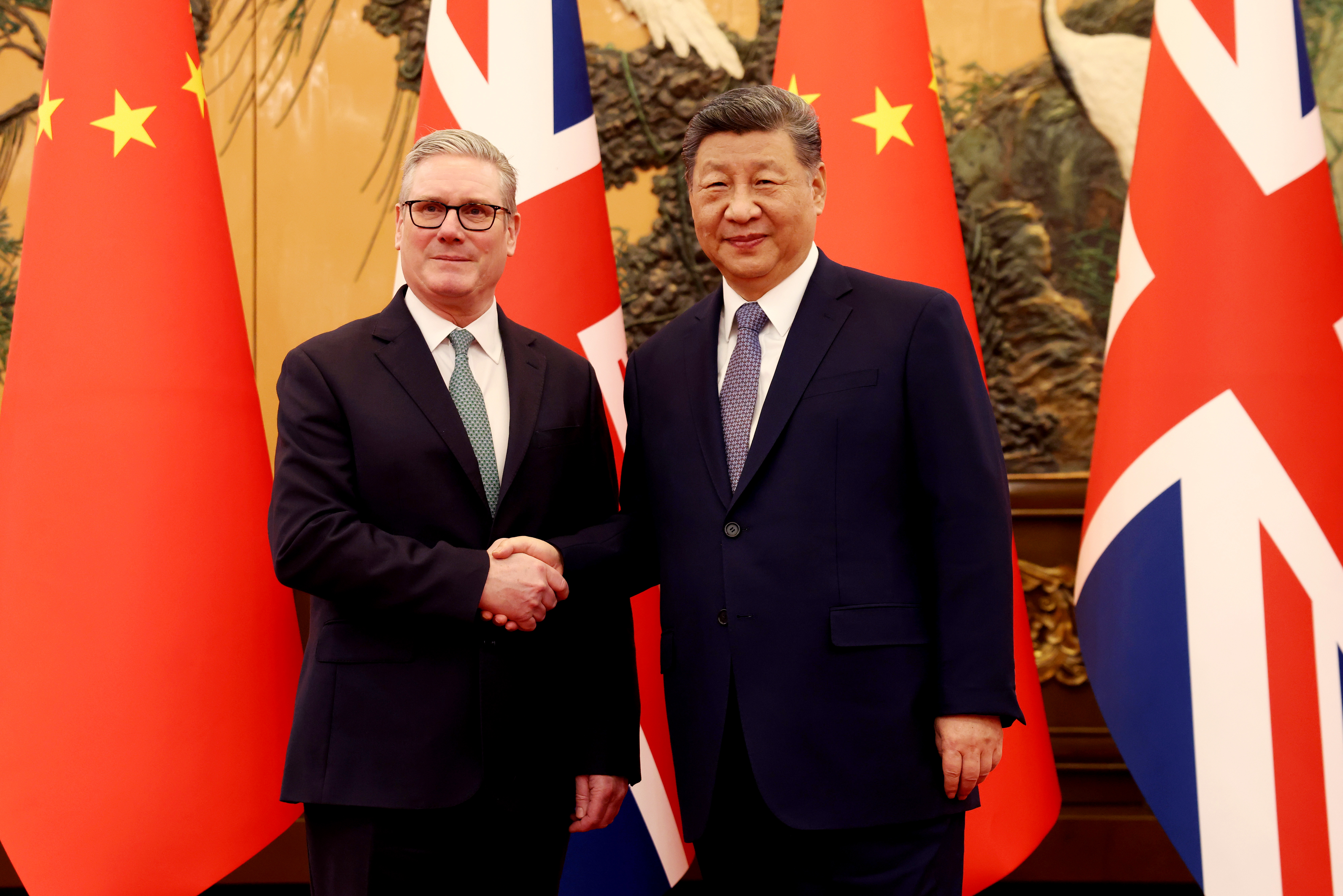
British Prime Minister Keir Starmer met with Chinese leader Xi Jinping in Beijing, 29 January 2026

China established diplomatic relations with the United Kingdom on 17 June 1954. The United Kingdom was the first major Western country to establish diplomatic relations with the People's Republic of China.

- China maintains an embassy in London.
- The United Kingdom is accredited to China through its embassy in Beijing, and consulate generals in Guangzhou, Hong Kong, and Shanghai.

The UK governed the territories of Hong Kong, from 1841 to 1941 and 1945 to 1997, as well as Weihaiwei from 1898 to 1930.

Both countries share common membership of the G20, the UNSC P5, the United Nations, and the World Trade Organization. Bilaterally the two countries have a Double Taxation Agreement, an Investment Agreement, and the Sino-British Joint Declaration.

=== Oceania ===
China maintains diplomatic relations with ten countries in Oceania: Australia, Fiji, the Federated States of Micronesia, Kiribati, New Zealand, Papua New Guinea, Samoa, the Solomon Islands, Tonga and Vanuatu whilst Taiwan has diplomatic relations with the other four. The Pacific is an area of intense and continuous diplomatic competition between the PRC and the ROC, with several countries (Nauru, Kiribati, Vanuatu) having switched diplomatic support from one to the other at least once. Both the PRC and the ROC provide development aid to their respective allies. The PRC has also made steps towards establishing an economic and political sphere of influence in the Pacific Islands, for instance through its "China–Pacific Islands Economic Development Forum" which was set up in 2006. As of 2019, Tonga was the only country in the Pacific that had China as its dominant creditor; the Chinese loans to Tonga were so concessional that they have been characterized as aid.

==== Policy ====
In 2003, China announced it intended to enhance its diplomatic ties with the Pacific Islands Forum, and increase the economic aid package it provided to that organization. At the same time, Chinese delegate Zhou Whenzhong added: "[T]he PIF should refrain from any exchanges of an official nature or dialogue partnership of any form with Taiwan".

In 2006, Chinese Premier Wen Jiabao announced that China would increase its economic cooperation with Pacific Island States. The PRC would provide more economic aid, abolish tariffs for exports from the Pacific's least developed countries, annul the debt of those countries, distribute free anti-malaria medicines, and provide training for two thousand Pacific Islander government officials and technical staff.

Also in 2006, Wen became the first Chinese premier to visit the Pacific islands, which the Taipei Times described as "a longtime diplomatic battleground for China and Taiwan". Similarly, according to Ron Crocombe, Professor of Pacific Studies at the University of the South Pacific, "There have been more Pacific Islands minister visits to China than to any other country".

In 2007, Xinhua, the Chinese official press agency, stated that Pacific Islands Forum member countries had "spoke[n] highly of the generous assistance China has provided to the region over the past many years and expressed the hope for a further enhanced cooperation with China".

In December 2007, Dr John Lee—Visiting Fellow at the Sydney-based Centre for Independent Studies—opined in a column for Islands Business:

"Why is China so interested in the Pacific? After all, despite the differences in size, population, wealth, and influence between China and islands in the region, the Chinese have literally rolled out the red carpet for Pacific leaders. Meetings between Chinese and Pacific leaders are not perfunctory 'meet and greets' in the bland boardrooms of hotels. They are often elaborate state functions with all the bells and whistles that state meetings can offer. [...] In a word, the Chinese want 'influence'. China sends more diplomats around the world than any other country. [...] In terms of the Pacific, there is a more disturbing game being played out, namely the 'chequebook diplomacy', that is taking place between China and Taiwan in their competition for diplomatic recognition at the expense of the other. Taiwan matters profoundly to China—and it is largely why China is interested in the Pacific."

That same month, John Henderson of the University of Canterbury stated that, in his view, many Pacific Islanders are worried "that their livelihood is being taken away by Chinese traders coming in, often getting in buying political privileges, playing a role in rigging elections". Henderson suggested that the 2006 anti-Chinese riots in Tonga and Solomon Islands could be repeated in countries such as Fiji and Vanuatu. He added that this might lead the PRC to increase its role in the region further, in order to protect ethnic Chinese Pacific Islanders. A spokesman for the Chinese embassy in Fiji, Hu Lihua, responded by stating: "China does not pose a military threat to any other country. China opposes all forms of hegemonism and power politics and will never seek hegemony or engage in expansion." A representative of Fiji's Chinese community similarly rejected the idea that there might be anti-Chinese riots in Fiji, and added: "The Chinese in Fiji have an excellent relationship with locals and we contribute toward the economy. We have been successful in understanding local customs. Many of us have learnt the language and have assimilated."

The final report of the April 2008 Australia 2020 Summit addressed China's influence in the Pacific in the following terms:

"It was noted that so far China did not seem interested in exporting its political values. Its interaction with the region was economically focused or motivated by rivalry winth Taiwan.
Noting China's growing military power and its emerging role as a major aid donor in the region, participants agreed that while China's visibility had increased rapidly there remained uncertainty over what it was seeking to achieve, especially in the long term. Securing energy supplies was one obvious goal. One strand of thought that had emerged was that the Chinese themselves were not entirely clear about their aims in the region."

In June 2008, a report from the Lowy Institute stated that China's aid policy towards the Pacific was almost certainly aimed solely at encouraging Pacific countries not to grant diplomatic recognition to Taiwan, and that there was no sign of the PRC attempting to increase its military influence or its access to the region's natural resources. Reuters reports that, according to the institute's findings, "China's chequebook diplomacy in the South Pacific and secrecy over its aid programme to small island nations is having a destabilising impact on the region", due to "concerns that dollar diplomacy was influencing local politics." A spokesman of the Chinese Foreign Ministry responded: "This assistance is on the basis of mutual benefit. It must help the local economy to develop and promote people's livelihoods. China would never interfere in these countries' internal affairs."

In June 2009, parliamentary delegations from four Pacific Island countries were jointly received by Wu Bangguo, Chairman of the Standing Committee of the National People's Congress. The delegation comprised Isaac Figir, Speaker of the Congress of the Federated States of Micronesia, Tu'ilakepa, Speaker of the Legislative Assembly of Tonga, Manu Korovulavula, head of the Public Accounting Commission of Fiji, and Billy Talagi, head of the Legislative Committee of Niue (a dependent territory of New Zealand). The delegation also met Chinese Premier Wen Jiabao, who spoke of increased "economic and trade cooperation"; Xinhua reported that the Pacific Island legislators "expressed appreciation for China's assistance" and "reiterated their countries' adherence to the one-China policy".

In August and September 2010, the People's Liberation Army Navy began an unprecedented "goodwill visit" to its Pacific allies, touring Papua New Guinea, Vanuatu, Tonga, New Zealand and Australia. Its aim, as reported by the People's Daily during the ships' four-day stop in Tonga, was "enhancing friendship and strengthening military cooperation".

In April 2011, the Lowy Institute issued a new report noting that China, in its approach to the Pacific, had been "shifting from grant aid to soft loans", which were "leading to increasing problems of indebtedness" and "making Pacific governments vulnerable to political pressure from Beijing". The report suggested that countries may struggle to repay the loans within the set timeframe, and that "outstanding loans may well tie Pacific countries to Beijing", in a context of diplomatic competition with Taipei. The report also noted, however, that some loans "are destined for projects that will create economic growth; growth that will create jobs, reduce poverty and help make repayments".

In May 2011, addressing the University of the South Pacific in Suva, PRC Ambassador to Fiji Han Zhiqiang stated that Sino-Pacific cooperation had resulted in "plenty of substantial outcomes and benefits for the people in this region". He indicated that the volume of trade between the PRC and Pacific Island countries had increased by about 50% between 2009 and 2010, reaching € 2.46 billion. The value of PRC exports to the region that year was €1.74 billion (up by 42% from 2009), whilst the value of its imports from the Pacific Islands was €730 million, up almost 100%. PRC investments in the Pacific Islands in 2010 -primarily to Samoa, the Marshall Islands, Papua New Guinea and Fiji- had reached almost €72 million.

In April 2012 China continued to widen its diplomatic influence with loans and aid with the region.

In late May 2022, Chinese Foreign Minister Wang Yi announced that China was pursuing a regional Pacific–wide agreement known as the China-Pacific Island Countries Common Development Vision with ten Pacific Islands states. This multilateral agreement would cover various issues including law enforcement cooperation and training, communications infrastructure, cybersecurity, climate change, healthcare, and a proposed China-Pacific Islands Free Trade Area. In response, the President of the Federated States of Micronesia David Panuelo opposed the proposed agreement, claiming it would create a new "Cold War" between China and the West. The Australian Prime Minister Anthony Albanese and Foreign Minister Penny Wong also vowed to increase Australian investment and developmental assistance to the Pacific Islands. Though China and the Pacific Islands states did not reach a consensus on the proposed multilateral agreement, Beijing succeeded in signing several bilateral agreements with Pacific states including separate security and civil aviation agreements with the Solomon Islands, ten bilateral agreements with the Solomon Islands, and an agreement to build a police fingerprint laboratory in Fiji.

==== Relations by country ====
===== Australia =====
(Australia) (China)

As an emerging and developing economy, China is a very important trading partner and destination for Australian raw material export for the growth of Australian economy. The two countries are currently strengthening their economic relations. The 2007 election of Kevin Rudd as Prime Minister of Australia has been seen as favourable to Sino-Australian relations, notably since he is the first Australian Prime Minister to speak fluent Mandarin, and that closer engagement with Asia is one of the "Three Pillars" of his foreign policy.

In 2004, Rudd, who at the time was Shadow Minister for Foreign Affairs, had delivered a speech in Beijing entitled "Australia and China: A Strong and Stable Partnership for the 21st Century".

In February 2008, Australia reportedly "chastised Taiwan for its renewed push for independence" and "reiterated its support for a one-China policy". In April, however, Rudd addressed Chinese students at Peking University, and, speaking in Mandarin, referred to "significant human rights problems in Tibet". Rudd also raised the issue in talks with Chinese Premier Wen Jiabao, in a context of "simmering diplomatic tension" according to TV3. In August 2008, Rudd met Wen once more, and expressed his concerns on "questions of human rights, of religious freedom, of Tibet, of internet freedom".

The COVID-19 pandemic has exacerbated issues and tensions between the countries, especially after Australia called for an international, independent inquiry into the origins of the disease. The subsequent changes that China made to its trade policies have been interpreted as political retaliation and economic coercion against Australia.

===== Fiji =====
(Fiji) (China)

Fiji was the first Pacific Island country to establish diplomatic relations with the People's Republic of China, in 1975. Among the Pacific Islands countries, Fiji was, in 2010, the second largest importer of PRC exports, after Papua New Guinea, and had a trade deficit of A$127m in its trade relations with China.

Fiji's foreign policy under Prime Minister Laisenia Qarase was to "look north" – i.e., strengthen the country's relations with Asia in general and China in particular. Following the 2006 military coup in Fiji, China contrasted itself from Western countries which largely condemned the overthrow of Qarase's government. Post-coup prime minister Frank Bainimarama continued Qarase's "look north" policy. In July 2007, Finance Minister Mahendra Chaudhry responded to the contrast between Western criticism and Chinese support for Bainimarama's government:

"Fiji has friends in China, it has friends in Korea, it has friends in [...] other Asian countries. We're no longer relying on Australia and New Zealand. And in any event, the United States was not doing much for Fiji anyway."

In 2007, a China/Fiji Trade and Economic Commission was set up to enhance economic relations between the two countries. A May 2008 article in The Sydney Morning Herald stated that "China's aid to Fiji has skyrocketed since the coup in December 2006", from €650,000 to over €100,000,000. The author of the article commented: "Just as Australia and other Western donors are trying to squeeze [Fiji's] rebel Government, China has dramatically stepped up its aid, effectively dissipating any pressure Western donors might have been generating."

===== Micronesia =====
(Federated States of Micronesia) (China)

The Federated States of Micronesia opened an embassy in Beijing.

===== New Zealand =====
(New Zealand) (China)

Diplomatic relations with New Zealand were first established in 1972. the PRC diplomatic representative to New Zealand, Zhang Limin, is also accredited to New Zealand's associated territories, the Cook Islands and, since 2008, Niue. The People's Republic of China in December 2007 became the first country to establish official diplomatic relations with Niue, and provides economic aid to the Cook Islands.

In September 2007, New Zealand reaffirmed its adherence to the "One China" policy.

In April 2008, New Zealand became the first developed country to sign a free trade agreement with the PRC.

On 29 September 2008, New Zealand's delegate in United Nations openly praised the improving relations between the two governments of Beijing and Taipei.

In July 2009, Niuean Premier Toke Talagi stated that, if development aid were not forthcoming from New Zealand, he would request aid from China instead.

===== Papua New Guinea =====
(Papua New Guinea) (China)

Diplomatic relations with Papua New Guinea were established in 1976, soon after Papua New Guinea became independent.

Papua New Guinea is one of China's biggest trade partners in Oceania. Papua New Guinea exports far more to China than does any other Pacific Islands country, and imports three times more from China than does any other such country. It is also one of the few countries in the region to maintain a trade surplus in its relations with China; its surplus reached a record high of A$427m in 2010.

In 1999, the government of Prime Minister Bill Skate recognized Taiwan. Skate lost power less than a week later, and Papua New Guinea's diplomatic recognition reverted to China.

In 2003, Chinese embassy in Port Moresby published a statement of concern in reaction to comments in the Papua New Guinea press questioning the justification for PNG's relations with the People's Republic. The embassy statement insisted that relations between the two countries were mutually beneficial, reasserted Chinese claims to Taiwan, and concluded: "It is our sincere hope that the local [PNG] media will report on China and its relations with PNG in a just and objective way, so as to further enhance the mutual understanding and friendship between the peoples of our two countries."

In July 2003, PNG Governor General Sir Silas Atopare visited China, re-affirmed his country's adherence to the One China policy, and, according to a statement published by Chinese embassy, "thank[ed] the government and the people of China for their commitment in providing aid to PNG's development".

In 2005, relations cooled somewhat when Papua New Guinea, along with Fiji, supported Taiwan's wish to join the World Health Organization.

It was announced that members of the Papua New Guinea Defence Force would receive training provided by China. Traditionally, military training aid in Papua New Guinea had been provided by Western countries, namely, Australia, New Zealand and the U.S.

===== Samoa =====
(Samoa) (China)

The diplomatic relations between China and Samoa were established in 1975.

In the late 1980s, China began sending doctors to the Samoan National Hospital, and sent over a hundred over the following two decades. Samoa significantly increased its volume of imports from China in the late 2000s, while also increasing its exports to that country. In 2010, Samoa reached a record trade deficit in its relations with China, at A$70m. In 2007, China provided Samoa with an x-ray machine and several volunteer doctors. In 2008, China donated over €1,360,000 to Samoa to fund its education policies.

In March 2008, following unrest in Tibet, the speaker of the Samoan Fono (legislative assembly), Tolofuaivalelei Falemoe Leiataua, stated that foreign leaders should not interfere with China as it deals with "internal affairs", and that they should not meet the Dalai Lama.

In June 2008, Samoa announced it would be opening diplomatic missions in China and Japan – the country's first diplomatic offices in Asia. In September, the Chinese Ministry of Foreign Affairs issued a statement indicating that China and Samoa have always "conducted fruitful cooperation in the fields of economy, trade, agriculture, sports, culture, education and health, as well as international affairs", and that China intended to "make more tangible efforts to support Samoa's economic and social development".

In 2010, the Chinese government-funded China-Samoa Agricultural Demonstration Farm was established in Nu'u with an aim "to train the Samoan farmers on voluntary basis through Chinese agricultural planting techniques". About 500 Samoan farmers received training from Chinese agricultural experts.

In 2011, 57 Samoan students were studying in China on a Chinese government sponsorship.

===== Tonga =====
(Tonga) (China)

Relations with Tonga were first established in 1998. In 2000, noble Tuʻivakano of Nukunuku (later to become Prime Minister) banned all Chinese stores from his Nukunuku District. This followed alleged complaints from other shopkeepers regarding competition from local Chinese. In 2001, Tonga and China decided to strengthen their "military relations". In 2008, China provided Tonga with military supplies worth over €340,000.

In 2006, rioters caused severe damage to shops owned by Chinese-Tongans in Nukuʻalofa.

In April 2008, Tongan King George Tupou V visited China, reaffirmed his country's adherence to the "One China" policy, and, according to the Chinese State news agency Xinhua, "supported the measures adopted to handle the incident in Lhasa". King Tupou V also met Chinese Defense Minister Liang Guanglie to "enhance exchange and cooperation between the two militaries". Xinhua stated that China and Tonga have "fruitful cooperation in politics, economy, trade, agriculture and education, and kept a sound coordination in regional and international affairs".

In early 2010, Chinese aid to Tonga included assistance in the reconstruction of Nuku'alofa's central business district; "an agricultural project in Vaini"; health clinics set up in Vavaʻu and Vaini; the provision of seven Chinese doctors for a two-year period; and an allocation of €2.2 million "for social and economic development", including "soft loans and interest free loans to the Tonga Government".

In April 2011, the Lowy Institute reported that, of all Pacific countries, Tonga was carrying the highest burden of debt from Chinese loans, amounting to 32% of Tonga's GDP. Simultaneously, the International Monetary Fund warned Tonga was "facing debt distress", a "very high possibility that Tonga [would] be unable to service its debts in the future".

===== Vanuatu =====
(Vanuatu) (China)

In 2006, Vanuatu signed an economic cooperation agreement with China, whereby the latter was to assist Vanuatu's economic development, and remove tariffs on imports from Vanuatu. China also added Vanuatu to its list of approved tourism destinations for Chinese tourists. Ni-Vanuatu trade minister James Bule said his country had also requested China's assistance "in supplying machines so we can establish a plant in Vanuatu to produce bio fuel". By contrast, Opposition leader Serge Vohor has said China is exerting too much influence on the ni-Vanuatu government's policy.

In May 2009, Vanuatu appointed its first ever ambassador to China, former Minister of Finance Willie Jimmy. Jimmy "call[ed] [...] for China to have a foot firmly planted in the Pacific through Port Vila", which -the Vanuatu Daily Post remarked- "no doubt caused ruffled feathers among other foreign diplomatic partners".

In July 2010, Chinese Ambassador Cheng Shuping announced that China would fund a number of projects in Vanuatu, "including the National Convention Centre and the expansion of Prime Minister's Offices", as well as "the design and reconstruction of the Francophone Wing of the University of the South Pacific Emalus Campus".

== Countries without diplomatic relations with the PRC ==
China recognizes all 193 UN member states, the Holy See and Palestine, as sovereign states. However, it does not have diplomatic relations with 12 UN member states, nor with the Holy See. Despite the lack of diplomatic relations, Bhutan recognizes the PRC.

The following countries recognize the Republic of China. As the PRC strictly follows the one China principle and refuses diplomatic relations with countries that have diplomatic relations with Taiwan, these countries do not have diplomatic relations with the People's Republic of China.

| Name | Previous relations with the PRC | Duration of previous relations with the PRC | References |
|---|---|---|---|
| Belize | Yes | 1987–1989 | Diplomatic relations with the PRC were established on 2 February 1987 and severed on 23 October 1989. Belize terminated diplomatic relations of the PRC and then recognized the ROC on 11 October 1989. |
| Eswatini | No | N/A | |
| Guatemala | No | N/A | |
| Haiti | No | N/A | In 1996, the Bureau of Commercial Development of the PRC in the Republic of Haiti and Bureau of Commercial Development of the Republic of Haiti in the PRC were established in Port-au-Prince and Beijing as the assignment between two countries. |
| Marshall Islands | Yes | 1990–1998 | Diplomatic relations with the PRC were established on 16 November 1990 and severed on 11 December 1998. Marshall Islands recognized the ROC on 20 November 1998. |
| Palau | No | N/A | |
| Paraguay | No | N/A | |
| Saint Kitts and Nevis | No | N/A | |
| Saint Lucia | Yes | 1997–2007 | The relations with the ROC were first established in 1984 and severed in 1997. Diplomatic relations with the PRC were established on 1 September 1997 and severed on 5 May 2007. Saint Lucia resumed diplomatic ties with the ROC on 30 April 2007. |
| Saint Vincent and the Grenadines | No | N/A | |
| Tuvalu | No | N/A | |
| Vatican City | No | N/A | Since the establishment of the PRC, Catholicism has been permitted to operate only under the supervision of the SARA. All worship must legally be conducted through state-approved churches belonging to the CCPA, which does not accept the Primacy of the Bishop of Rome. The Holy See was banished from China following the incident around the death of Antonio Riva in 1951. In 2016, negotiation of diplomatic relations between the Holy See and the PRC started. See China–Holy See relations. |

== See also ==
- China–European Union relations
- China–United States relations
- China–Russia relations
- China–Ukraine relations
- List of diplomatic missions in China
- List of diplomatic missions of China
- List of diplomatic missions of the Qing dynasty
- Panda diplomacy
- Stadium diplomacy
- Ten Major Relationships
- Arctic policy of China
- China foreign aid
- Foreign relations of Hong Kong
- Foreign relations of Macau
- Foreign relations of Taiwan
- Xi Jinping Thought on Diplomacy
- Chinese school of international relations
- List of projects of the Belt and Road Initiative
