= La Barrancosa Dam =

- Location within Argentina
- Country: Argentina
- Location: Puerto Santa Cruz, Santa Cruz Province
- Coordinates: 50°11′31.76″S 70°7′14.64″W
- Purpose: Power
- Status: Under construction
- Construction began: July 2015

Dam and spillways
- Type of dam: Embankment, concrete-face rock-fill
- Impounds: Santa Cruz River
- Height: 43.5 m (143 ft)
- Length: 2,900 m (9,500 ft)
- Dam volume: 6,900,000 m^{3} (9,000,000 cu yd)

Reservoir
- Total capacity: 2,720,000,000 m^{3} (2,210,000 acre⋅ft)
- Surface area: 198 km^{2} (76 mi^{2})

Power Station
- Hydraulic head: 34.65 m (113.7 ft)
- Turbines: 5 x 120 MW Kaplan-type
- Installed capacity: 600 MW
- Annual generation: 1,866 GWh (estimate)

The Complejo Hidroeléctrico Cóndor Cliff (ex-N.K) y La Barrancosa (ex G.J.C.) Dam, is a concrete-face rock-fill dam being built on the Santa Cruz River about 115 km (71 mi) west of Puerto Santa Cruz in Santa Cruz Province, Argentina. A consortium led by China's Gezhouba Group was awarded the contract to build the Condor Cliff & La Barrancosa Dam upstream in August 2013. The consortium will also fund the construction. Both dams are expected to cost nearly US$4.8 billion. The dam is being built by Eling Ingeniería, the successor of Electroingeniería of Osvaldo Acosta and Gerardo Ferreyra. The primary purpose of the dam is hydroelectric power generation and its power station will have an installed capacity of 600 MW.

In July 2015 machines arrived in Santa Cruz for the construction of the dams.

In December 2023 construction was stopped awaiting funding from China.El 18 de julio de 2025 se firmó un entendimiento con las empresas y el gobernador Claudio Vidal para reactivar la construcción de una de las represas de Santa Cruz, una obra de casi US$5000 millones. En diciembre del 2025, se efectivizaron la transferencia de 150 millones de dólares a la empresa China Gezhouba Group, un paso clave para poner nuevamente en marcha una de las represas del complejo Hidroeléctrico en el Río Santa Cruz, Cóndor Cliff – La Barrancosa, que se construye sobre el río Santa Cruz, paralizado desde 2023.
