= Santa Cruz River (Argentina) =

River in Argentina

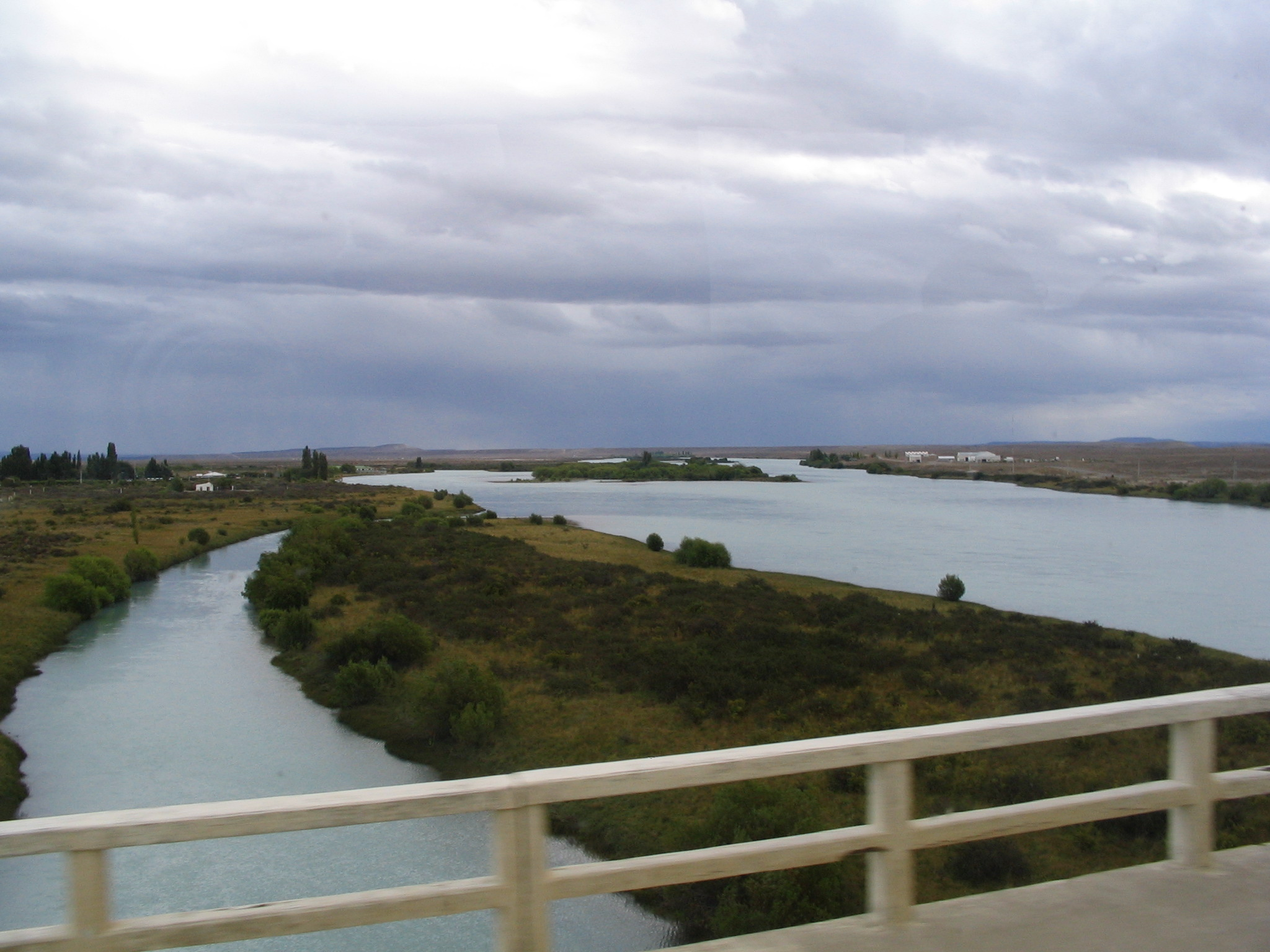
- Crossing the Santa Cruz River at Comandante Luis Piedra Buena, Argentina

- Location of mouth

Location
- Country: Argentina

Physical characteristics
- Mouth
  - coordinates: 50°08′S 68°21′W

Santa Cruz River (Spanish: Río Santa Cruz) is a river in the Argentine province of Santa Cruz. The Santa Cruz begins at the shore of the Viedma and Argentino Lakes, of glacial origin and located in the Los Glaciares National Park, and runs 385 kilometres (239 mi) eastwards before reaching the Atlantic Coast, 350 kilometres (217 mi) north of the southern tip of South America, creating a delta. It is one of the last large free-flowing rivers in Patagonia.

== Dams ==
The river has an important flow of 790 m^{3} (1,030 cu yd) per second on average, and is used for irrigation. Two dams are planned for the river, the Jorge Cepernic and Nestor Kirchner Dams. They will have a combined installed capacity of 1,740 MW. Contracts to construct the dams were awarded to a consortium of Chinese and domestic companies in August 2013. It is estimated that the dams will destroy over half of the Santa Cruz River ecosystem.

== History ==
Santa Cruz River was discovered by Europeans during Magellan's circumnavigation of the Earth, by Juan Serrano, captain of the Santiago, one of the ships of the Magellan fleet, by August 5, 1520. After learning of the favourable conditions that Serrano found at Santa Cruz, Ferdinand Magellan decided to move the fleet there from St. Julian, where they had stopped to overwinter, around August 24. They would spend six weeks at Santa Cruz before resuming their search for the strait that would link the Atlantic Ocean to the Pacific Ocean, now called the Magellan Strait.

By the start of April 1834, HMS Beagle had reached a stage in its survey voyage where minor repairs were needed to its keel and copper sheathing, so Captain Robert FitzRoy chose the river as a suitable place to lay the ship ashore. While this work was carried out, FitzRoy led an expedition upriver with aim of finding its source, 300 kilometers (186 mi) distant in the Andes. Three boats set out on April 18, carrying twenty-five men, including FitzRoy and naturalist Charles Darwin. All involved took turn in teams dragging the boats up river for 16 days. Darwin took careful note of everything, including the terrain around the river, the flora and fauna of the region, and the geology exposed as the river cut through the plains.

April 22nd. -- The country remained the same, and was extremely uninteresting. The complete similarity of the productions throughout Patagonia is one of its most striking characters. The level plains of arid shingle support the same stunted and dwarf plants; and in the valleys the same thorn-bearing bushes grow. Everywhere we see the same birds and insects. Even the very banks of the river and of the clear streamlets which entered it, were scarcely enlivened by a brighter tint of green. The curse of sterility is on the land, and the water flowing over a bed of pebbles partakes of the same curse. Hence the number of waterfowl is very scanty; for there is nothing to support life in the stream of this barren river.

At the outset of the voyage, FitzRoy had given Darwin the first volume of Charles Lyell's Principles of Geology, which used the uniformitarian paradigm that the key to the past is the present and that led to the interpretation of present geology in the light of slow and gradual processes. Darwin was greatly impressed by the series of stepped plains of pebbles which would have formed over long periods in the sea, and went against Lyell's ideas of continuous gradual development by implying an intermittent process. When Darwin described this in his book on South America's geology, he wrote "I think we must admit, that within the recent period, the course of the Santa Cruz formed a sea-strait intersecting the continent. At this period, the southern part of South America consisted of an archipelago of islands".

In his Journal of researches, p. 218, Darwin criticised the catastrophism proposed by former geologists who, in trying to explain the erosion of the lava and other rocks of the valley,

"....would have brought into play, the violent action of some overwhelming debacle; but in [the case of the Santa Cruz] such a supposition would have been quite inadmissible; because the same step-like terraces, that front the Patagonian coast, sweep up on each side of the valley. No possible action of any flood could have thus modelled the land in these two situations; and by the formation of such terraces the valley itself has been hollowed out....we must confess it makes the head almost giddy to reflect on the number of years, century after century, which the tides unaided by a heavy surf, must have required to have corroded so vast an area and thickness of solid rock."

The expedition ended due to lack of supplies and turned around, had they gone a bit further they would have discovered that the source of the river valley was the glacial lake Lago Argentino at the foot of the mountain.

May 4th. -- Captain Fitz Roy determined to take the boat no higher. The river had a winding course, and was very rapid; and the appearance of the country offered no temptation to proceed any further. Everywhere we met with the same productions, and the same dreary landscape. We were now one hundred and forty miles distant from the Atlantic and about sixty from the nearest arm of the Pacific. The valley in this upper part expanded into a wide basin, bound on the north and south by the basaltic platforms, and front by the long range of the snow-clad Cordillera. But we viewed these grand mountains with regret, for we were obliged to imagine their nature and productions, instead of standing, as we had hoped, on their summits. Besides the useless loss of time which an attempt to ascend the river any higher would have cost us, we had already been for some days on half allowance of bread. This, although really enough for reasonable men, was, after a hard day's march rather scanty food: a light stomach and an easy digestion are good things to talk about, but very unpleasant in practice.

5th. -- Before sunrise we commenced our descent. W shot down the stream with great rapidity, generally at the rate of ten knots an hour. In this one day we effected what had cost us five-and-a-half hard days' labor in ascending On the 8th, we reached the Beagle after our twenty-one days expedition. Every one, excepting myself, had cause to b dissatisfied; but to me the ascent afforded a most interesting section of the great tertiary formation of Patagonia
