= Condor Cliff Dam =

Dam in Puerto Santa Cruz, Santa Cruz, Argentina

- Location within Argentina
- Country: Argentina
- Location: Puerto Santa Cruz, Santa Cruz Province
- Coordinates: 50°12′41.67″S 70°46′30.29″W
- Purpose: Power
- Status: Under Construction

Dam and spillways
- Type of dam: Embankment, concrete-face rock-fill
- Impounds: Santa Cruz River
- Height: 75.5 m (248 ft)
- Length: 2,780 m (9,120 ft)
- Dam volume: 14,100,000 m^{3} (18,400,000 cu yd)

Reservoir
- Total capacity: 6,260×10^{6} m^{3} (5,080,000 acre⋅ft)
- Surface area: 275 km^{2} (106 sq mi)

Power Station
- Hydraulic head: 64.47 m (211.5 ft)
- Turbines: 6 x 190 MW (250,000 hp) Francis-type
- Installed capacity: 1,140 MW (1,530,000 hp)
- Annual generation: 3,380 GWh (12,200 TJ) (estimated)

The "Complejo Hidroeléctrico Cóndor Cliff (ex-N.K) & La Barrancosa (ex G.J.C.) Dam, formerly known as Condor Cliff Dam, is a concrete-face rock-fill dam being built on the Santa Cruz River about 180 km (110 mi) west of Puerto Santa Cruz in Santa Cruz Province, Argentina. A consortium led by China's Gezhouba Group was awarded the contract to build the Condor Cliff & La Barrancosa Dam downstream in August 2013. The consortium will also fund the construction. Both dams are expected to cost nearly US$4.8 billion. The dam is being built by Eling Ingeniería, the successor of Electroingeniería of Osvaldo Acosta and Gerardo Ferreyra. The primary purpose of the dam is hydroelectric power generation and its power station will have an installed capacity of 1,140 megawatts (1,530,000 hp).

In July 2015 machines arrived in Santa Cruz for the construction of the dams.

In December 2016 Supreme Court of Argentina decided to suspend work on the dam.

In December 2023 construction was stopped awaiting funding from China.

On July 18, 2025, an agreement was signed with the companies and Governor Claudio Vidal to reactivate the construction of one of the dams in Santa Cruz, a project worth almost US$5 billion. In December 2025, the transfer of US$150 million to the Chinese company Gezhouba Group was finalized, a key step to restart one of the dams in the Cóndor Cliff – La Barrancosa hydroelectric complex on the Santa Cruz River, which has been under construction since 2023.
