= Turaga na Rasau =

Fijian chiefly title of the Lau Islands

Map of Vanuabalavu and Lomaloma

Turaga na Rasau is a traditional Fijian chiefly title of the Lau Islands. Prior to Fiji's colonial days, Fiji had many different Vanua with their own Paramount Chieftain which exercised no authority over the other; a saying from the island of Kadavu aptly summarises it "Nomu Turaga o sega na noqu Turaga" or "Your Chief is not my Chief" also the people of Beqa Island were of a similar opinion saying "Qali Cuva Ki Lagi" or "Subject only to heaven" and would bow to no outside Chieftain, but at the turn of the 20th century aspects of the traditional social structure remained, but for administrative purposes three main Matanitu were solidified and formed as they were the dominant consolidated powers at the time being that of Kubuna, Burebasaga and Tovata. With regard to the Rasau while its traditional origins were in Kubuna on Bau the titles traditional authority in modern Fiji is now in Tovata, Lau in particular Lomaloma Tikina on the Island of Vanua Balavu.

== Turaga na Rasau ==
Fijian regional and inter-regional chiefly titles vary in name and history and each tribal unit will have its own unique title with its history, mythology and Folklore and as tribes interacted in trade or in war, their unique stories and histories became intertwined, there is evidence of this across the Fiji island Group and also with Fiji's closest Pacific neighbor and sometimes friendly foe Tonga, the following section of this article covers that of the Turaga Na Rasau as far as its traditional jurisdiction, translation, composition and location.

=== Lomaloma ===
1c.

Yasana Ko Lau (Province of Lau)

Vanua Ko Lomaloma (District of Lomaloma)

Turaga Rasau, Tui Tuvuca

Koro Ni Lomaloma (Villages of Lomaloma District)

Lomaloma, Sawana, Susui, Narocivo, Namalata, Uruone, Levukana, Dakuiloma, Tuvuca

=== Composition and location ===
1a. The Turaga Na Rasau is the Chieftain of Lomaloma Tikina and the Turaga I Taukei for Yavusa Buca as per NLTB records from 1895 to date. there are two other Yavusa that being Yavusa Qala and Yavusa Naturuku with their Chieftain being Ravunisa and Tui Naturuku.

The Yavusa Toga of Sawana village are an exception as they are the direct descendants of Enele Ma'afu and his conquests and are independent of the Rasau. Past title holders of the Rasau title have had ties via intermarriages to both Yavusa Toga and Yavusa Buca but have not led both.

Future decisions of the Rasau's authority will have to be decided and passed through provincial and tikina meetings and documented with NLTB records. As the records stand the Rasau is currently the Chieftain for Lomaloma Tikina and Lomaloma koro and the Yavusa and Matagali that fall within this domain. Lomaloma Tikina comprises 10 villages and they are as follows: Lomaloma (Nakoro), Sawana, Susui, Narocivo, Namalata, Uruone, Levukana, Dakuilomaloma, and Tuvuca. These villages are located on the island of Vanua Balavu except for Tuvuca, which lies between Vanua Balavu and Lakeba and near the Island of Nayau, all of which are located in the Lau group of islands, which form part of the island nation of Fiji.

=== The title ===
1b. Ratu Keni Waqalekaleka Ugadregadrega Naulumatua II is most senior in line for the title although the traditional installation has not taken place. Ratu Keni is the head Chief or the Turaga I Taukei of the Yavusa (tribe) Vusaratu Vuaniivi Buca, Mataqali (clan) Vusaratu Vuaniivi Buca, and Tokatoka (family unit) Valelevu. According to Ratu Keni II the title Rasau is a short form for Ratu Ni Vanua, Sau Ni Vanua roughly translated to Chief of the land or representation embodying all that is the people and their ways and their ancestor gods. In a direct transliteration, Ra is a prefix in many titles (Ramasi, Ramalo, Ratu) and Sau is simply 'Chief' it also has the same meaning in Rotuma and Tonga (Hau).

The Turaga na Rasau in Native land and Fisheries recorded documents is part of the Tokatoka Valelevu, Matagali Buca and Yavusa Buca and heads the Tikina of Lomaloma, the addition of Vusaratu and Vuaniivi in the clan and tribe names was added on request of the Turaga I Taukei and the Tokatoka Valelevu in remembrance of the chiefly ancestors of the Tokatoka Valelevu of the Turaga na Rasau.

== Origin on the mainland ==
=== Legend and facts ===
"2a. The title of the Turaga na Rasau, according to the tokatoka Valelevu of Yavusa Buca says its origins are from the eldest descendants of the Mythological Chief and Master Sailor Ratu Lutunasobasoba, the Ratu ni Vanua and Roko Kubunavanua, the Sau-ni-Vanua, and that is where the anointer word Ra-Sau comes from, however the Lutunasobasoba legend has many variations depending on the province and village and its authenticity has been questioned and said to be the fabrication of European missionaries other villages in the province of Ra say he was an outsider who arrived with his people and was such a trouble maker that he was banished from Nakauvadra, however it is viewed the legend still remains part of the social and ceremonial fabric of Fijian ceremony and folklore but whether there is archaeological or historical evidence to prove the great Migration Myth or not, history does show that the Rasau Originates from Kubuna, more importantly from Bau Island which is part of Bau Tikina from the Roko Tui Bau Vuani-ivi descendents, which is on the main Island of Viti Levu through the eldest line of descendents of Ratu Vueti as noted down by traditional Bauan historian the late Ratu David Toganivalu of the Masau while doing a comparative study of the link to the Rasau with Ratu Viliame Fonolahi Keni, titles they both held in the order as mentioned, they found that at one stage in old Fiji the Masau were the heralds of the Rasau.

2aa. It is believed that through Oral history passed down amongst the Tokatoka Valelevu of the Rasau that all Fijian tribes generally derived from Vuni-ivi-Levu (an Island that once lay between Viti levu and Vanua Levu which later sank) and also Nakauvadra, and Burotukula Yasayasa Moala, and thence spread out to occupy the various lands and islands which now all come under the banner of Viti. Viti Levu transliterates in English to Fiji Big; Levu in Fijian means Big and "Viti" is the Fijian name for Fiji, According to Oral tradition of the Tokatoka Valelevu of the Rasau, Ratu Lutunasobasoba named Viti, for the people he selected to travel up the mountain range to the village called Lomolomo, which is named Tua-Leita. The leading range traveller was named "Coci", who was the second eldest son of Degei. Ratu Lutunasobasoba called this place Viti Kau or Viti Kalevu or Viti Levu and later was called Viti.

2aaa. The name Fiji came about because our Neighbour Tonga accepting the Europeans amongst them much earlier pronounced Viti as ‘Fisi’ Captain James Cook coming to Fiji Via Tonga where he heard the expression and then used the term to refer to ‘the Cannibal Isles’ (which is how they were first known to the European) as ‘Feejee’ now known as Fiji. "

Please note that in the following part of this article especially points 2a, 2aa and 2aaa, diverges on topic to some historical points and explanations of time, places, people, names, mythology and folklore this is to create an overall understanding of the Rasau Title and its origins.

=== Nakauvadra to Bau ===
2b. Kubuna is known as a confederacy or Matanitu in Fiji but in pre-colonial times Kubuna was a place name with that in mind, as recorded in Bauan pre colonial history, It was at Kubuna that the great ancestral Chief, Ratu Vueti Koroi-Ratu mai Bulu, Serui-Ratu mai Bulu, the first Roko Tui Bau Vuani-ivi, (according to legend he was the fourth (4) generation from Ratu Lutunasobasoba) who established the Kingdom of Kubuna, and formed one of the earliest known Fijian settlements after hostilities ceased the people of Nakauvadra and the victorious Bauan army upon leaving the Mountains and finding their way to the sea made a Cairn named Ulunivuaka and later called it Bau in honour of Ratu Vueti and his achievements.(it was named after a shrine in the Nakauvadra hill range in the province of Ra)

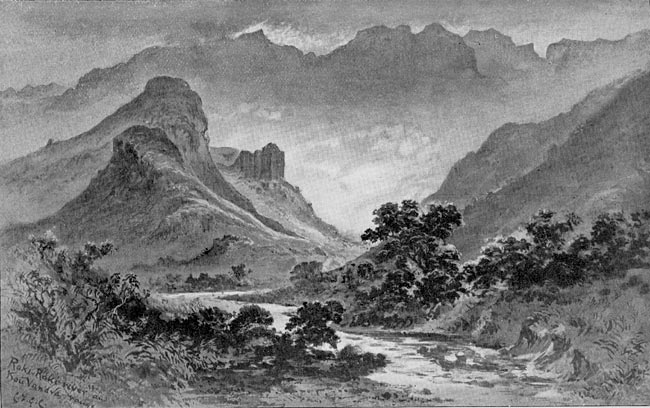
Nakauvadra Mountains 1860

He took the titles of Roko Tui Bau Vuani-ivi and Koroi Ratu Maibulu. After his death, he was buried in Kubuna in a throne called Tabukasivi, and was deified and became the ancestral god of the people of Kubuna, they worshiped him in the form of a serpent.

After his death a division arose between Bucaira and Vunibuca over the installation of a successor to Ratu Vueti. Other clans went to Namuka and wandered from place to place. Eventually a new Roko Tui Bau, Ratu Serumataidrau, was selected from the Vuaniivi, a Tokatoka Valelevu of the Mataqali and the Yavusa Ratu Vuani-ivi Buca clan, which had settled at Namuka.

== The reign of Naulivou ==
The following section outlines the continuation of a journey and the battle of two Chieftain and their tribes the losing senior Chief then settles in the far flung Lau Islands while his subordinate then seizes power, this is to show the early history of the Rasau.

=== Naulivou and Raiwalui ===
Bau Spirit House at Ucui Nabou and Lasakau shoreline scene. Viwa Island in background. From a drawing by Lieut. Conway Shipley 1848.

3a. Naulivou was installed circa 1804 as the Vunivalu (in modern Fiji this is now the highest chiefly title in the Kingdom of Kubuna, but was not so in Fiji's early history) after the death of his father Banuve who had three sons Naulivou, Tanoa II and Celua. Ratu Raiwalui of the Roko Tui Bau Vuaniivi Clan, Yavusa-Ratu, became the sixth Roko Tui Bau Vuani-Ivi which was the highest chiefly title in the greater area of Kubuna and the second Roko Tui Bau Vuani-Ivi that occupied the Island Delainakorolevu or Ulunivuaka, which was then called Bau in 1760 which was named by the fifth Roko Tui Bau Vuani-ivi Ratu Lele who was then buried at Delai Daku the hilly range of Viwa Island. But the relationship between these two men was not a happy one. When they came into conflict, the Vuaniivi clan fled to Kubuna and sought the protection of Titokobitu, the Chief of Namara. Together with some other chiefs of Namara, they reached Koro and from there went to Vuna, on the island of Taveuni, and thence to Vanuabalavu. The Namara people who later joined their early travellers now of Levukana village on Lomaloma, were left behind at Vuna and they fled to the mountains lest the Bauans should pursue them. The Vuaniivi warriors left some of their war canoes high and dry on the beach at Vuna when they set off for Vanuabalavu.

=== Wars and betrayals ===
3b.(1808–1809) When Naulivou heard that they were at Vanuabalavu, he sent his brother Tanoa to pursue and punish them by using firearms, and this was the third campaign in which firearms were used in Fijian battle. Charlie Savage who had been wrecked in the Eliza showed the Vunivalu how to use "guns" and it was these new weapons that assisted the Vunivalu to subdue all things he wanted. Tanoa with his men and Ratu Raiwalui with his followers unexpectedly met at sea not far from Mago Island and a battle royale ensued in which the Vuaniivi lost about a hundred men, including their chief Ratu Raiwalui, the Roko Tui Bau Vuani-ivi, the first "Ra-Sau" of Delainakorolevu Lomaloma. His body was then taken to Lomaloma for burial at Matanituvu. Those who escaped took refuge with the Namara people at Vuna. On returning to Bau, Tanoa stopped at Vuna and captured an enemy town, Vuloci. They put up little resistance eventually surrendering and as a peace offering, presented a woman of chiefly rank, Adi Sugavanua of the Vuaniivi, Vusaratu clan, who was taken to Bau and became the wife of Naulivou. Tanoa on seeing the Vuaniivi war canoes on the beach at Vuna, set fire to them and secured for himself the name Tanoa Visawaqa, or Tanoa "The burner of boats".

Tanoa went to Vanuabalavu once again hiding in an Island called Yanuca at Raviravi in the bay of Lomaloma and so the Vuani-ivi entering the Namalata passage once again engaged him in battle in which the Vuani-ivi lost again over hundred men in Lomaloma bay and all their bodies were taken to Navavaoa at Lomaloma for burial. The Vuani-ivi clan went back to Bau and left the Yavusa Vueti, Navusaqa, Naturuku, Kavika, Yaro, and Radave to occupy the hilly village Delainakorolevu, which was the mountain village at Lomaloma. On Reaching Bau the warfare intensified during the time of Tanoa, which eventually led to his exile, firstly at Koro Island, and thence to Somosomo in Taveuni where he remained for-years until his son Seru who was allowed to live in Bau during his fathers exile, gained power by subverting the Lasakau people to plot and execute an overthrow of the Roko Tui Bau Vuani-ivi clan led by Ratu Ravulo Vakayaliyalo In 1837 and reinstated his father as the ruling Vunivalu ni Bau. It was then that Seru was given the name "Centipede" in Fijian called "Cikinovu" because ‘he moved silently and struck painfully’ and later he was called Cakobau or ‘destroyer of Bau’, in subverting the Lasakau people to plot and execute a "Coup". The title Vunivalu was originally the Roko Tui Bau Vuani-ivi second in command and Minister of war, Vu-ni-valu in a direct transliteration means "Lord of War".

=== What came to pass ===
3c. The Roko Tui Bau Vuani-ivi clan, Ratu Ravulo Vakayaliyalo, Ratu Waqatabu Matawaqa and Ratu Niumataiwalu Kinita, the sons of Ratu Raiwalui the Roko Tui Bau Vuani-ivi went back to Vanuabalavu at Delainakorolevu, Lomaloma and there followed the Lasakauan, they were left at the island Laucala near Taveuni and the rest are at Levukana a village in Lomaloma Tikina on the Island of Vanuabalavu and still live there to this very day.

The Vunivalu's tenacity and actions however they are judged paid off. Naulivou and Tanoa secured supremacy of Bau and their growing strength brought many victories across Fiji which brought the Island Nation into a new era of History which eventually saw a reluctantly united Fijian Nation under the rule of Ratu Seru Cakobau, the Rasau and his people remained in Lomaloma and their descendents live there to date.

== Rasau of recent history ==
Note: These are the names documented not long after cession in 1874 to the United Kingdom, it was then that titles, title holders and their lineage were documented and held in government records these records came to be known as "Ai Vola ni Kawa Bula" now maintained under the Native lands and Fisheries Commission.

=== Chart 4 ===
Order	Rasau, Tui Tuvuca	Lived	Reigned	Notes
1.	Ratu Jese Waqalekaleka	1847–1943	1867–1943	Ratu Jese was the eldest son of Ratu Waquila Vakavou (Tui Daku) the eldest line from the second eldest son of Ratu Raiwalui being Ratu Waqatabu Matawaqa, Ratu Jese's mother was Adi Josivini Vana Tukana, Naulumatua mai Natewa (the eldest child from the senior chiefly family of Natewa).
2.	Ratu Keni Naulumatua	1895–1972	1944–1972	Chief, Soldier and Government Officer; eldest son of Ratu Jese Waqalekaleka.
3.	Ratu Nelesoni Delailomaloma	1902–1995	1973–1995	Chief and Government Officer; Succeeded his older brother Ratu Keni who died in 1972.
4.	Ratu Viliame Fonolahi Keni Naulumatua	1930–2000	1995–2000	Chief, Government Officer and Accountant; Ratu Viliame was the oldest son of Ratu Keni,
5.	Ratu Keni Ugadregadrega Waqalekaleka Naulumatua	1952 - living	2000 to date	Chief, Soldier and Architect Born 1952 and is the currently living 2nd youngest son of Ratu Keni & younger brother of Ratu Viliame, the traditional ceremony of installation is yet to be performed, Ratu Keni resides in Suva and is a member of the Fiji Military forces.

== A detailed lineage of the Turaga Na Rasau ==
Please note: this lineage numbers in order of descendants and its progression from Roko Tui Bau Vuaniivi into the Rasau. Included in the chart are their names, whom they married, their place of origin, where they travelled, and some brief points of their history if known. These are in Fijian with English translation in brackets, although some parts are just in English. The number sequence starts again when the title Turaga Rasau begins its use, and also when a younger line takes over after the older line became extinct.

=== Chart 5a ===
Order	Roko Tui Bau Vuaniivi	Lived	Reigned	Notes
5a-1.	Ratu Vuetiverata	unknown	unknown	Se Koro-i-Ratu mai Bulu Na (Turaga na Roko-Tui –Bau Vuani-ivi) Na (Ratu ni Vanua Vakaturaga ko Kubuna, na Sau Gatagata ni Vanua Vakaturaga ko Kubuna, Okoya ka Tauyavutaka na Matanitu ko Kubuna). Raluve-i-Batiki se (his wife from Batiki Island) Adi Bunoinatokalau Na Ulumatua Nei (the eldest child of) Ratu Tuinayavu, Na Ratu Ni Vanua Ko Batiki (the Chief of Batiki)
5a-2.	Ratu Serumataidrau	unknown	unknown	Se Kubunavanua (Turaga Na Roko-Tui Bau Vuani-ivi) He moved from Kubuna to Namuka.
5a-3.	Ratu Tauriwau Bale-i-Savai	unknown	unknown	(Turaga Na Roko Tui Bau VuaniIvi) he resided in Namuka.
5a-4.	Ratu Veikoso	unknown	unknown	(Turaga Na Roko Tui Bau VuaniIvi) he resided in Namuka.
5a-5	Ratu Lele	unknown	unknown	(Turaga Na Roko Tui Bau Vuaniivi) (He moved from Namuka to Delaidaku Viwa then to Delainakorolevu se Ulunivuaka sa qai vakayacana me ko Bau mei vaka nanumi ni suvasuva nei Ratu Vueti mai Nakauvadra. (1760). (Translation: When he moved back to Ulunivuaka He then named it Bau as a milestone in Memory of Ratu Vueti).

=== Chart 5a-6 ===
Order	Roko Tui Bau Vuaniivi to Rasau	Lived	Reigned	Notes
5a-6-1.	Ratu Raiwalui	unknown	unknown	(Turaga Na Roko Tui Bau Vuani-ivi) (He Moved from Bau to Lomaloma Delainakorolevu, Matai Ni Ratu Ni Vanua kei Na Sau Ni Vanua Ko Lomaloma). Tacina his brothers (Ratu Manalawa, Okoya mai na Ivi-Mila, Okoya mai nai Sevubokola (6-2)) kei Ratu Koyamainaicavunisala (6-3) (1790) (1808–1809) Naulivou was involved in a power struggle with the high chief, the Roko Tui Bau Ratu Raiwalui thus begun a period of internecine warfare within Bau. He Left Bau and went to Kubuna then to Verata then to Gau then to Nagamai then to Koro then to Vuna then finally to Vanuabalavu Lomaloma.
5a-6-2.	Ratu Ravulo Vakayaliyalo	unknown	unknown	(Rasau) (the eldest son of 6–1) he married Yasikula who hailed from the Island of Tuvuca, Tacina (his siblings were) Ratu Waqatabu se Matawaqa (6-1b) kei (Ratu Niumataiwalu Kinita (6-1c) he resided on Delainakorolevu Vanuabalavu Then with his brothers went back to Bau in (1833) after the war in Vanuabalavu. Seru Cakobau later overthrew the Roko Tui Bau, which restored to Tanoa as Vunivalu ni Bau in 1837 after which they then went back to Vanuabalavu Delainakorolevu Lomaloma to date, the Title of Tui Tuvuca was first added to the Rasau
5a-6-3.	Ratu Niumataiwalu Kinita	unknown	unknown	Rasau, Tui Tuvuca (the youngest son of 6–1) (moved from Delainakorolevu to Naiviqa) married Katoa
5a-6-4.	Ratu Tanoa	unknown	unknown	Rasau, Tui Tuvuca (the son of 3) (moved from Naiviqa to Naocovonu)
5a-6-5.	Ratu Ilaitia Vakawaletabua	unknown	unknown	Rasau, Tui Tuvuca the son of 3, he moved from Naocovonu to Lomaloma.
5a-6-6..	Ratu Poasa Vakadewavanua	unknown	unknown	Rasau, Tui Tuvuca, the son of 3, he resided in Lomaloma.
5a-6-7.	Ratu Sailosi	unknown	unknown	Rasau, Tui Tuvuca, the son of 3, he resided in Lomaloma.
5a-6-8.	Ratu Semesa Qilotabu	unknown	unknown	Rasau, Tui Tuvuca, the son of 3, he resided in Lomaloma.
5a-6-9.	Ratu Etika Nakavulevu	unknown	unknown	Rasau, Tui Tuvuca, the son of 5, he resided in Lomaloma.

=== Chart 5b ===
Order	Rasau, Tui Tuvuca	Lived	Reigned	Notes
5b-6-10.	Ratu Jese Waqalekaleka Ugadregadrega	as in chart 4	as in chart 4	(he resided in Lomaloma)(Kawa mai vei Ratu Waqatabu Matawaqa (6-1b)) Luvena Ratu Wakuila Vakavou)(he was from the eldest line of the second eldest son of Ratu Raiwailui (6-1) who was Ratu Waqatabu Matawaqa (as the eldest line had become extinct), Ratu Jese was the son of Ratu Wakuila Vakavou). Ratu Wakuila held the Title of Tui Daku.
5b-6-11.	Ratu Keni Naulumatua	as in chart 4	as in chart 4	(the son of 10) born 1895, he died and was buried in Suva. He Married Mere Tuisalalo, 2nd Marriage Sera Qolisaya
5b-6-12.	. Ratu Nelesoni Delailomaloma	as in chart 4	as in chart 4	(the son of 10)Married Adi Yalani (he resided on Lomaloma then moved to Suva)
5b-6-13.	Ratu Viliame Fonolahi Naulumatua	as in chart 4	as in chart 4	(the son of 11) Married Alisi Miller of Levuka (He resided on Lomaloma, then Levuka and later moved to Suva, he died and was buried in Brisbane, Australia)
5b-6-14.	Ratu Keni Waqalekaleka Ugadregadrega Naulumatua II	as in chart 4	as in chart 4	(yet to be installed traditionally (the son of 11) Married Vasemaca. (currently residing in Suva)

== The continuation of the title ==
After the death of Ratu Keni Naulumatua II, his title will return to the eldest line of the patrilineal lineage, which will be Ratu Viliame Fonolahi's children Ratu Clifton Keni Fonolahi Naulumatua, Ratu Edger Keni, and Ratu Ivan Keni. It is possible for the title to descend through a junior lineage or through the maternal lineage, but such a decision would have to be approved by Tikina elders, the chiefly family members of Tokatoka Valelevu of the Matagali and Yavusa Buca, because the position is held for life.

== A notable chieftain of the Rasau ==
Notability is a position of exalted widely recognized importance. As recorded history in Fiji is limited, there may have been many that would have been notable men or women and likewise there would have been many Chieftain of the line of the Rasau that were worthy of notice like Ratu Raiwalui, Ratu Poasa Vakadewavanua and Ratu Jese Waqalekaleka. However, documents with detailed information about these individuals are rare or unobtainable. However, more Rasau of recent history have had anthropological articles written on them or contributed to anthropological research in the early part of the 20th century and were documented and are held in record and their stories can be shared, the most well documented life of the Rasau of Recent history was of Ratu Keni Naulumatua he contributed to works by anthropologists Arthur Maurice Hocart in his books "Lau Islands" and "Fijian Heralds and Envoys" as well as Mr Alex Phillip Lessin in his book "Village of conquerors" and participated quite actively in the early days when Fiji was a young colony.

=== Ratu Keni Naulumatua ===
7-1a. Ratu Keni Naulumatua (1895–1972) was a Fijian chief who held the title of Turaga Na Rasau he inherited this title after the death of his father who held the title before him for more than 70 years, Ratu Keni reigned for 32 years from 1944 to 1972. He was the firstborn son of Ratu Jese Waqalekaleka who was the eldest son of the Tui Daku Ratu Waquila Vakavo, Ratu Keni was the third eldest child but the eldest son. His last name, broken down, is as follows: ‘Na’ is a joining word in this case like 'the'; 'ulu' means 'head'; 'Matua' is like 'wise’ or ‘learned’. It roughly translates as ‘the wise man’. Its more correct intended meaning is "first born".

Preceded by Ratu Jese Waqalekaleka 1867–1943	Turaga Na Rasau, Tui Tuvuca; 1944–1972	Succeeded by Ratu Nelesoni Delailomaloma 1973–1995

Ratu Keni Rasau and Ratu Sukuna Tui Lau, Tui Nayau and other chieftains of Lau in Vanua Balavu, 1918

7-1b. Ratu Keni was the 11th Turaga Na Rasau and his line traces back more than 10 generations of Rasau, but for only 9 generations was the title Tui Tuvuca also included in the Rasau Title, but they are two quite separate titles. Tuvuca is part of the Tikina of Lomaloma and the chiefly title of this island is held by the Tui Tuvuca, which is generally held in personal union by the reigning Turaga na Rasau. The Village Chief of Tuvuca holds the title of Ramasi, it was this chiefs ancestors who gave the title to the Rasau of Lomaloma because he brought peace to Tuvuca and stopped a long-standing feud. Ratu Keni was married twice and had many children. His first marriage was to a woman of Tongan nobility from the Village of Sawana, her name was Adi Mere Tuisalalo of the Yavusa Toga, Tokatoka Togalevu., with whom he had six children Adi Josivini Vana Tukana, Ratu Viliame Fonolahi and the twins Adi Tupou Moheofo and Adi Mereani Louakau, Ratu Jese Waqalekaleka, and Adi Mere Tuisalalo. Then with his second wife, Adi Sera Qolisaya of Daliconi Village, he had 3 sons, Ratu Viliame Tuiqilaqila Serunadibi, Ratu Keni Ugadregadrega, and Ratu Tanoa Senibua.

=== Symbols of a royal household ===
7-2a. Each Yavusa, Matagali and Tokatoka in Fiji identifies itself by a name and also by identification with certain plants and animals, A possible correlation would be totems or even a Coat of arms if they so wish to make it a visual emblem, which have a different historical significance to each family unit or tribe.

7-2b. Every tribe belongs to a specific structure within a Vanua, while Vanua not only refers to land area it also embodies beliefs, common ancestors and spiritual connections, but in this case could be simplified to translate as a small kingdom, in the Vanua of Lomaloma which is part of the greater Kingdom or Yasana of Lau of which the following defines Ratu Keni's tribe and family unit to whom he belongs, traditionally speaking across Vanuabalavu they only have Yavusa and Matagali no Tokatoka the exception being with the Vanua of Lomaloma:

Yavusa (Greater tribe)(Vusaratu Vuaniivi) Buca, Mataqali (smaller tribal unit within the Yavusa or clan)(Vusaratu Vuaniivi) Buca, Tokatoka (family unit within clan), Valelevu (translated means big house).

7-2c. The following is the specific totems or coat of arms for Ratu Keni Naulumatua of Tokatoka Valelevu:

Vua-ni-Kau (fruit of the tree) Ivi (Tahitian Chestnut) /

Manumanu (animal) Koli (Dog)/

Ika (Fish) Saqa Leka (Giant Trevally - caranx ignobilis)) /

Salusalu (floral garland) Bua Ni Viti (Fagraea berteriana) /

Tutuvakavanua (Elders of the kingdom) Turaga (his position/place in the Kingdom).

=== Points of interest ===
7-3. Ratu Keni served with The Fiji Labour Detachment in France in the First World War and was a decorated soldier; his good friend who won the French medal of honour was Ratu Sir Lala Sukuna At the end of the war they toured Europe playing the steel guitar and singing in cafes before returning home to help build their nation. Ratu Sukuna went on to become known as the modern founding father of the Fiji Islands and Fiji's first Lawyer, while Ratu Keni served 40 years in the civil service some of that time was also spent in Dunedin, New Zealand in a working capacity representing Fiji, he died at age 77 and was buried in Suva.

=== A strategic marriage ===
7-4a. The term Vasu in Fiji refers to an individuals maternal ties to a village, Matagali etc. If a child is of a woman of rank he/she is a Vasu Levu to that particular area, if both mother and father are Fijian he/she is a Vasu I Taukei, if both mother and Father are Fijian and both are of a very senior chiefly rank from respective areas then the child's Vasu connection is referred to as Turaga na Vasu. Intermarriage and the Vasu was used to expand kingdoms, unite old enemies or strengthen chiefly family links.

Details of Ratu Keni Naulumatua's first wife Mere Tuisalalo and her family are as follows: The mother of Mere Tuisalalo was Setaita Miller; the father of Mere Tuisalalo was Viliame Fonolahi from Kologa in Tonga. Viliame Fonolahi was a devout Christian and was rumoured to have baptized the former Tui Vuda (a prominent Ba chief) as a Christian. Setaita's mother was herself closely related to the Tongan Royal family.

7-4b. Mere Tuisalalo's older sister Lusiana Qolikoro had a relationship with Ratu Tevita Uluilakeba, Turaga Na Tui Nayau high Chieftain of the Island of Nayau and Lakeba in the Lau Archipelago, and their son was Ratu Sir Kamisese Kapaiwai Tuimacilai Mara, who served for decades as Prime Minister and President of Fiji.

7-4c. Mere Tuisalalo's younger sister Laisa Kaukiono had issue with the Turaga na Tui Kaba na Vunivalu Ratu Edward Tuivanuavou Tugi Cakobau (fondly known as Ratu Tui) and their child was Ratu Tui's eldest child and son Ratu Viliame Dreunimisimisi of Bau. The father of Ratu Sir Edward Tuivanuavou Tugi Cakobau (1908–1973) was the King of Tonga and his mother was Ratu Seru Epenisa Cakobau's granddaughter Adi Litia Cakobau.

=== Another wedding ===
7-5 Later in life Ratu Keni remarried and his second wife was Adi Sera Qolisaya of Daliconi Village from the tribe of the Tui Daku, a title Ratu Keni's grandfather Ratu Waquila Vakavo held.

== The Installation of the Turaga na Rasau, Tui Tuvuca ==
When a title holder of the Rasau dies, Yavusa Buca must choose a successor this will be chosen from the elder brothers, siblings or blood relations of Yavusa Buca, Tokatoka Valelevu. Those from Dakuilomaloma hold council and only they the heralds (Matanivanua) attend to Ratify the decision, once the decision has been finalised the Ravunisa and his people of Yavusa Gala are informed and then The Ramasi of Tuvuca and his people.

=== In Lomaloma ===
The Rasau bears no title before the installation, of old Lomaloma the village was divided into two and there was only one chief being the Rasau. The whole village would attend the installation, the men of Daku would mix the Yaqona for the installation and on either side of the Tanoa was two men from Tuvuca (one is the Takala and the other the Matakilomaloma. ) and then a further two men of Daku would stand behind those mixing the Yaqona armed with a club, their role is to stand guard during the installation. Then before mixing the Torchmaster (Daunicina) of Dakuilomaloma then lights the flaming torches Once the Yaqona is mixed the Heralds to the Rasau stands and shouts to the village “Hear me people of Lomaloma today is held the installation of the Sau, the Chief of us lomalomans, know well and obey him and extend to him all the chiefly customs”.

=== The ceremony ===
Once the Yaqona is mixed and the torchmasters (Daunicina) have held the flaming torches (the torches are held whether day or night ) up to the Yaqona as it pours from the bowl back into the Tanoa and the herald exclaims “Wai Donu” then the Takala and Matakilomaloma approach carefully the candidate being installed with 3 pieces of Masi (Bark cloth) and ask him to stand, they then tie the cloth one on the left and one on the right arm, then the herald stands and ties the third piece of masi on his right arm, once the arms are bound with masi both the herald and the Sau are seated. Then the Takala exclaims to the people “hear you men of lomaloma today is installed the Tui Tuvuca and the Sau of Lomaloma”, then to the Rasau he says “The Masi we are tying we tie for you to be Rasau and to love the people and to look after them well, so that no evil may come”. the Takala and the Matakilomaloma then sit down and clap once (Obo) and crawl back to the Tanoa (Yaqona basin where Yaqona is prepared and served from) the Kava is then brought to the Rasau and he drinks, once he has finished the two warriors of Tuvuca then approach the Rasau and stand behind him on either side and they speak the following words “This sir is your rampart, these clubs we two are carrying, be not faint hearted, we here are the men of Navusaveti, the name of the club we hold is called UPHOLD THE RASAU” they retire to their places and Kava is then poured for the Herald (matanivanua), then come the Naividrawalu who drink third because they are the nobles (taba Turaga) in Yavusa Buca and are the support for the Yaqona (I raviti ni Yaqona.) but they are never installed as Rasau. Then fourth the Turaga Na Ravunisa drinks and after him the rest drink. The Daunicina (Torchmaster) then extinguishes the flaming torches after the Yaqona ceremony has finished.

=== Tui Tuvuca ===
After installation they all remain in Lomaloma for four nights, then the people of Dakuilomaloma and Tuvuca take the Rasau to Tuvuca, when he arrives in Tuvuca all the children are removed and there should be no crying or sound, for whoevers child cries it is that household who will prepare a feast as atonement for the breaking of the silence. The people of Tuvuca make feasts and the rest of the people carry flaming torches, after four nights of this the Rasau bathes in the sea and then the silence can be broken and the children can cry and the chopping of wood can also commence, the Rasau then returns to Lomaloma.

=== Recent history of the installation ===
There has not been a formal installation of the Turaga na Rasau since 1973 after the death of Ratu Keni Naulumatua and the installation of his brother Ratu Nelesoni Delailomaloma. The current most senior living candidates are firstly the sons of Ratu Viliame Fonolahi and his brothers (Ratu Jese, Ratu Viliame, Ratu Keni and Ratu Tanoa) children. Yavusa Buca and Tokatoka Valelevu have not yet met to choose a successor to the Title.

== Tuilabelabe the Dog of War ==
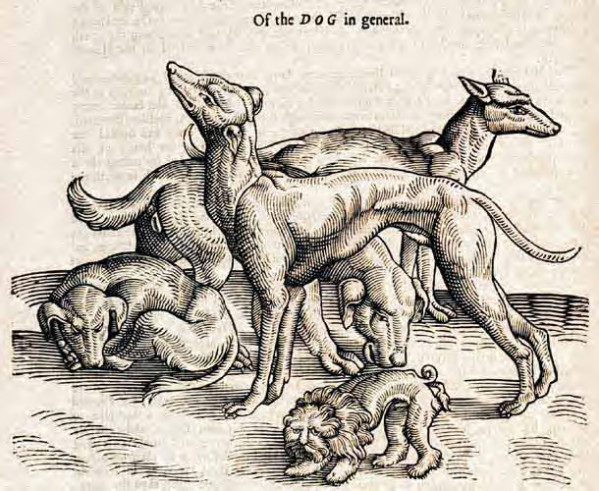
Woodcut illustration of dogs, 1658

The Dog has been a spiritual representation for Yavusa Buca in particular tokatoka Valelevu from time immemorial the origins for this tradition are now forgotten.

In early records the Rasau was just referred to as Sau and the priest of spirits; if a battle was to be fought with Mualevu, the people of Buca and Lomaloma would bring him offerings of Tabua and as many as a hundred Tapa cloth this, Rasau at that time had a large dog referred to as Tuilabelabe or Tuinaividrawalu who would bark in the direction of the Army that would be defeated and based on this the people of Buca and the Lomalomans would decide to fight.

It is said until this present day that if anyone from Yavusa Buca is about to die the Dog Labelabe will appear as an omen of what will follow.

== See also ==
- Lasakau sea warriors
- Roko Tui Bau
- Tanoa Visawaqa
- Vunivalu of Bau
- Seru Epenisa Cakobau
- Turaga Na Ravunisa
