= Roko Tui Bau =

Fijian chief

In Fiji, Turaga na Roko Tui Bau is a vassal chief of the Vunivalu of Bau (the chief of the post-Cakobau enclaves of the Kubuna confederacy). From his seat at the residence of Naicobocobo, the Roko Tui Bau rules the Vusaratu chiefs (including the Roko Tui Viwa, Roko Tui Kiuva, and Rokodurucoko) and has relationships with the Roko Tui Dreketi, Ratu Mai Verata, Roko Tui Namata, Roko Tui Veikau, Tui Vuya and other members of Fiji's House of Chiefs.

The title is not received by primogeniture, but the candidate must be a high-ranking member of the Vusaratu clan. The Roko Tui Bau is a subordinate chief, and the selection process is independent of the Vunivalu of Bau and his Tui Kaba clan.

== Status ==
The Vunivalu was not always the senior chieftain in Kubuna and Bau; the title was considered subordinate to the Roko Tui Bau. Power struggles resulted in Vunivalu Tanoa Visawaqa undertaking a 17th-century expedition to the interior (Naitasiri) of Vitilevu; he was captured and held hostage until his release by Veremi of Wainikelei in Moala, whose people now occupy the highlands of Sera, Ra, Naitasiri, and Vugalei. The lineage is said to be from the eldest son of Ratu mai Vereta, who presumably died on his maiden voyage after landing at Qaliqali in Moala. His clan knew themselves as Wainikelei through Kapaiwai Mara, who advised councillors of Bau to seek Wainikelei help after the eighth conquest by Namosi failed.

== Origin in folklore ==
According to myth, the Fijians originated in Tanganyika. Tura landed at Naicobocobo (Bua); his eldest son Lutunasobasoba landed at Vuda Point, and Degei and his siblings landed on the Rakiraki coast. Fiji was already occupied when they arrived.

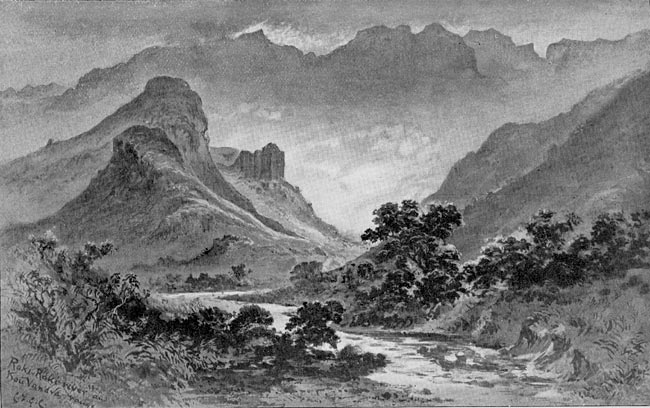
The Nakauvadra Mountains in 1860

Among them were the descendants of Koya Na Sau, the eldest son of Tui Waicala-na-vanua I's 11 children, from whom the first Roko Tui Bau derived. He was known as Ratu Vueti, the son of Ratu Vaula, the son of Ratu Vula (or Ra-Vula) from Moturiki, and his mother was Buisavulu (Lutunasobasoba's eldest daughter).

After the Nakauvadra war, Ratu Vueti left via Nakorotubu, where he had his firstborn child (a son, the original Gonesau or 'child with supernatural power', named Nadurucoko). He was born to a woman from Suva in Bureiwai, Nakorotubu District. Nadurucoko was the father of Nailatikau Nabuinivuaka, the first Vunivalu of Bau and Kubuna.

When Ratu Vueti reached Moturiki, he returned to Bau Island and ordered the construction of a temple to bury the sacred stone (tawake kei Viti) in its foundation mound. The temple is known as Vatanitawake ("the shelter of Fiji").

The Moturiki group were lineal descendants of Ratu Vueti's three sons. They became the three Tokatoka of Vuaniivi, Nacokadi and Nadruguca, and were the first to settle in Kubuna. Ratu Vueti was buried there, in a mound known as Tabukasivi, and was worshiped in the form of a serpent. After his death, a division arose over the installation of a successor to Vueti. A new Roko Tui Bau, Ratu Serumataidrau, was selected from the senior Vuaniivi line.

Those who went to Moala Island travelled more and were led by lineal descendants of Roko Nadurucoko, claiming collateral descent from Ratu Vueti. They dispersed to Totoya and Tonga; some returned, regrouping first in Verata and then in Nayavu (second time). From there, they split. One group left Nayavu to settle on the Kaba peninsula (adopting the name Tui Kaba); the second group, known as the Vunivalu, continued to Viria before ending up in Ovea.

Although all groups acknowledged the Roko Tui Bau as paramount, they were independent due to geographic separation. The Roko Tui Bau settled on the island of Ulunivuaka, which was already home to the Butoni and Levuka peoples. The island was renamed Bau, in honour of the Roko Tui Bau. The Vusaratu and the Tui Kaba, with their Vusaradave warriors, were the first to settle the island; the Butoni were expelled, to resettle in Namacu on Koro Island. The Levuka remained as fishers and sailors, moving to the hill in the center of the island.

In 1760, the Vunivalu people reportedly learned that the Levuka were keeping the best seafood for themselves and presenting smaller fish as tribute. Nailatikau (chief of the Tokatoka Vunivalu) expelled the Butoni, who settled on Lakeba). He also adopted the additional name of Nadurucoko and established himself as the first Vunivalu of Bau (secular chief), reunifying the two groups who had split on Moala Island and taking the title of Tui Kaba.

Nailatikau was succeeded by Banuve, who reclaimed wide areas of the adjacent reef flats and built stone docks and sea walls during his 30 years as Vunivalu. He allowed fishers from Beqa and Kadavu Islands to settle on the island and establish the villages of Lasakau and Soso. The Lasakau sea warriors formed the core of the Bauan navy.

== See also ==
- Vunivalu of Bau
- Turaga na Rasau
- Bau Village
- Verata
