= Lomaloma =

Village on the island of Vanua Balavu in the Lau archipelago of Fiji

- Village
- Lomaloma Tikina
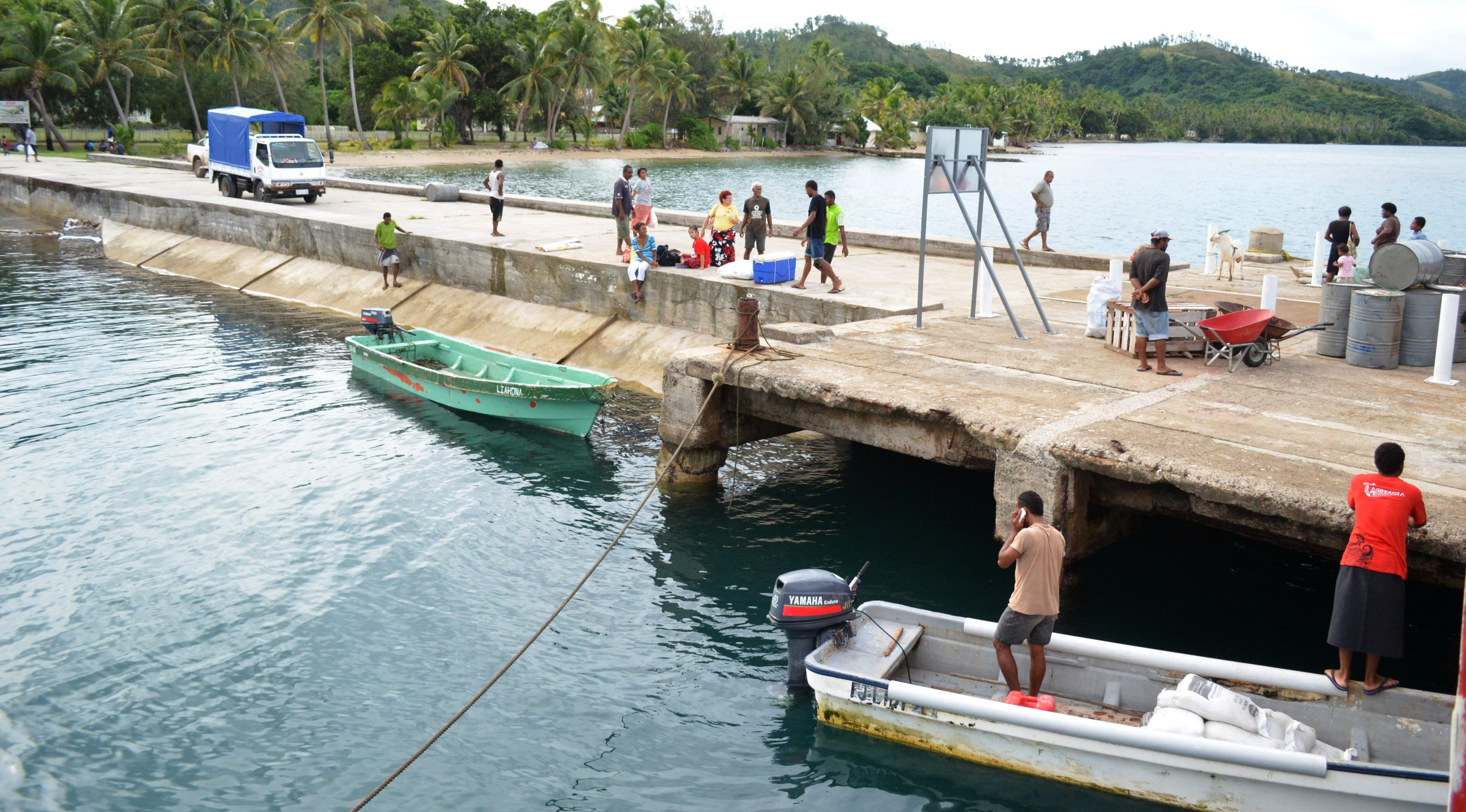
- The Lomaloma jetty, Vanua Balavu, Fiji

- Vanua Balavu

- Location in Fiji
- Country: Fiji
- Division: Eastern Division
- Province: Lau
- Island: Vanua Balavu
- Archipelago: Lau Islands
- Established as capital: 1855
- Founder: Enele Ma'afu

Government
  - Type: Traditional Fijian governance
  - Traditional leaders: Multiple chiefly titles
- Time zone: UTC+12 (Fiji Time)
- Villages in Tikina: 9 villages: Lomaloma, Sawana, Susui, Narocivo, Namalata, Uruone, Levukana, Dakuilomaloma, Tuvuca
- Tribes (Yavusa): 13
- Clans (Mataqali): 42
- Family units (Tokatoka): 54
- Historical significance: First modern town in Fiji, former capital of Lau Confederacy

Lomaloma (Fijian pronunciation: [lomaloma]; officially Lomaloma Tikina, Fijian pronunciation: [lomaloma tikina]) is a village at the south of the island of Vanua Balavu in the Lau archipelago of Fiji. The settlement is part of the tribal district of Tikina, Lomaloma and consists of 9 villages, 13 Yavusa (tribes), 42 Mataqali (clans), and 54 family units known as Tokatoka. The nine villages of Lomaloma Tikina are Lomaloma, Sawana, Susui, Narocivo, Namalata, Uruone, Levukana, Dakuilomaloma, and Tuvuca.

From early records, first documented in 1881 by the Native Lands and Fisheries Commission, there were three Turaga i Taukei (Senior Chiefs) for Lomaloma Tikina listed, namely Ratu Jese Waqalekaleka – Turaga na Rasau, Ma'afu Tui Lau, Roko Tui Lau, Head of the Tovata and also representing Yavusa Toga of Sawana and Jaoti Sugasuga – Turaga Na Ravunisa.

== Village and district titles ==
Chiefly titles in Lomaloma Tikina are Ravunisa, Rasau, Tui Naturuku, Tui Urone, Tui Levukana, Tui Narocivo, Tui Daku, Tui Susui, Tui Mago (Namalata) and Ramasi (Tuvuca Island).

Sawana is another village within Lomaloma and is home to the Yavusa Tonga with their head being the Tui Lau, a title that is filled following the recommendation of the Yavusa Tonga and the endorsement of the Tui Nayau from the Vuanirewa clan. Ratu Mara was the last Tui Lau and this position remains vacant pending the formalization of the position between the Yavusa Tonga and Yavusa Lakeba. Each of these villages and Yavusa have their own respective Tukutuku Raraba ni Yavusa (Documented tribal history) as referenced in the Native Records.

== History ==
In early Fijian history, Lomaloma village, although small, is regarded as the first modern town in Fiji. It was established by Tui Lau Enele Ma'afu as the capital of the Lau Confederacy, combining the Lau Group (Lakeba, Nayau, Oneata, Ono, Cicia, Fulaga, Kabara, Vanuavatu, Moce, Namuka, and Ogea), Yasayasa Moala Group (Moala, Matuku, and Totoya) and the Somosomo Group (Vanuabalavu, Tuvuca, Kanacea, Mago, Naitauba and Yacata). In Ma'afu's time, it also acted as a key port of call between Tonga and Viti Levu.

=== Ma'afu as the Tui Lau ===
Lomaloma became famous in Fiji's history as the base from which Enele Ma'afu waged his campaign under the supervision of the Tui Nayau. Ma'afu opted to settle in Lomaloma in the village of Sawana. His installation as the Tui Lau in Lakeba in February 1869, and his assuming control of all Tongan land in Fiji, saw his confirmation as a Fijian Chief. Three months later in 1869, at Sawana, his position was confirmed when the Chiefs of Cakaudrove, Bua, and Lau installed him as Tui Lau and President for Life of the Tovata Confederacy.

On Easter Friday 1854, Ma'afu responded to the news that seventeen people were murdered in a massacre similar to the St. Bartholomew's Day massacre, from Rev Dr. Lyth, the resident minister on Lakeba, who had received the news from Mataiasi Vave, a fellow Tongan on Vanua Balavu. The massacre took place because of an apparent quarrel over the distribution of turtle meat, within the Nakoro clan of Ravunisa. Motukavonu is where the Mataqali Nadawavula killed the turtles for meat. The aggrieved party from the Mataqali Naitasiri of the Yavusa Qala (also the Ravunisa clan), approached relatives in Yaro in Mualevu, who with the co-operation of the Naturuku people, carried out the gruesome killings. Mataiasi Vave, the surviving Ravunisa, the Rasau, and their people sought refuge in Susui whilst Mataiasi Vave sent his request for assistance to Lakeba. This was referenced in A History of Fiji by R.A. Derrick and Tovata I & II by A.C. Reid gives an account of Ma'afu's influence in Lau.

Ma'afu and Wainiqolo campaigned in Lomaloma and Vanuabalavu in what has become known as the "Valu ni Lotu". They defeated the "heathens" and on 3 June 1854, Rev Dr. Lyth in his diary stated:

Ma'afu and his men returned quite unexpectedly from Vanua Balavu and reported the war between the heathens and the Christians had ended in favour of the latter. Ma'afu returned to Lakeba with the murderers (the Naturuku people) to be captives for life, in Lakeba.

— A.C. Reid, Tovata I & II, Page 43

In 1855, Ma'afu had acquired sovereignty over northern Lau and established Lomaloma as his base following his exchanges with Tui Cakau Tuikilakila.

A.C. Reid, in his book Tovata I & II, accounted for the people that lived in Lomaloma when Ma'afu took control of Vanuabalavu, who had surrendered to him for protection from the raiders of Mualevu. The 'Tukutuku Raraba ni Yavusa', as referenced in Tovata I & II by A.C. Reid, confirmed that the people of Nakoro were migrants and travelers from other parts of Fiji who settled on the island. Yavusa Qala had the Ravunisa as its leader. He was brought from Narocivo and installed as their leader even though they had their own traditional Tui Lomaloma title as their head. The Ravunisa was exiled from the Senimoli clan of Yaro who were later called Mualevu. These were the people that plotted to murder the Ravunisa which resulted in the "Valu ni Lotu". Yavusa Buca had the Rasau as its leader, who was exiled from Bau after a bloody coup led by the then Vunivalu and traveled along Vanua Levu, Somosomo, and accidentally landed at Lomaloma. He was welcomed by the Naturuku people and provided shelter and people to care for and support them. Yavusa Naturuku with the Tui Naturuku as its leader came from Vanua Levu and landed on the northern part of Vanua Balavu near Daliconi and traveled south dropping off settlers at Levukana to where they finally settled at Delainakorolevu.

These three Yavusas settled into their new village called Nakoro, short for Delainakorolevu, within the greater settlement of Lomaloma. They were of equal standing within their village of Nakoro.

All three Yavusas left no doubt about who was in charge with all three surrendering their land and their people as inducement for Ma'afu to conquer Mualevu.

When Ma'afu settled and created his village called Sawana, he relocated the rest of the people to where they are today and formed the greater settlement called Lomaloma made up of Nakoro, Sawana, Nagara, and the settlement to the north to cater for the Colonial government services.

== Points of interest ==
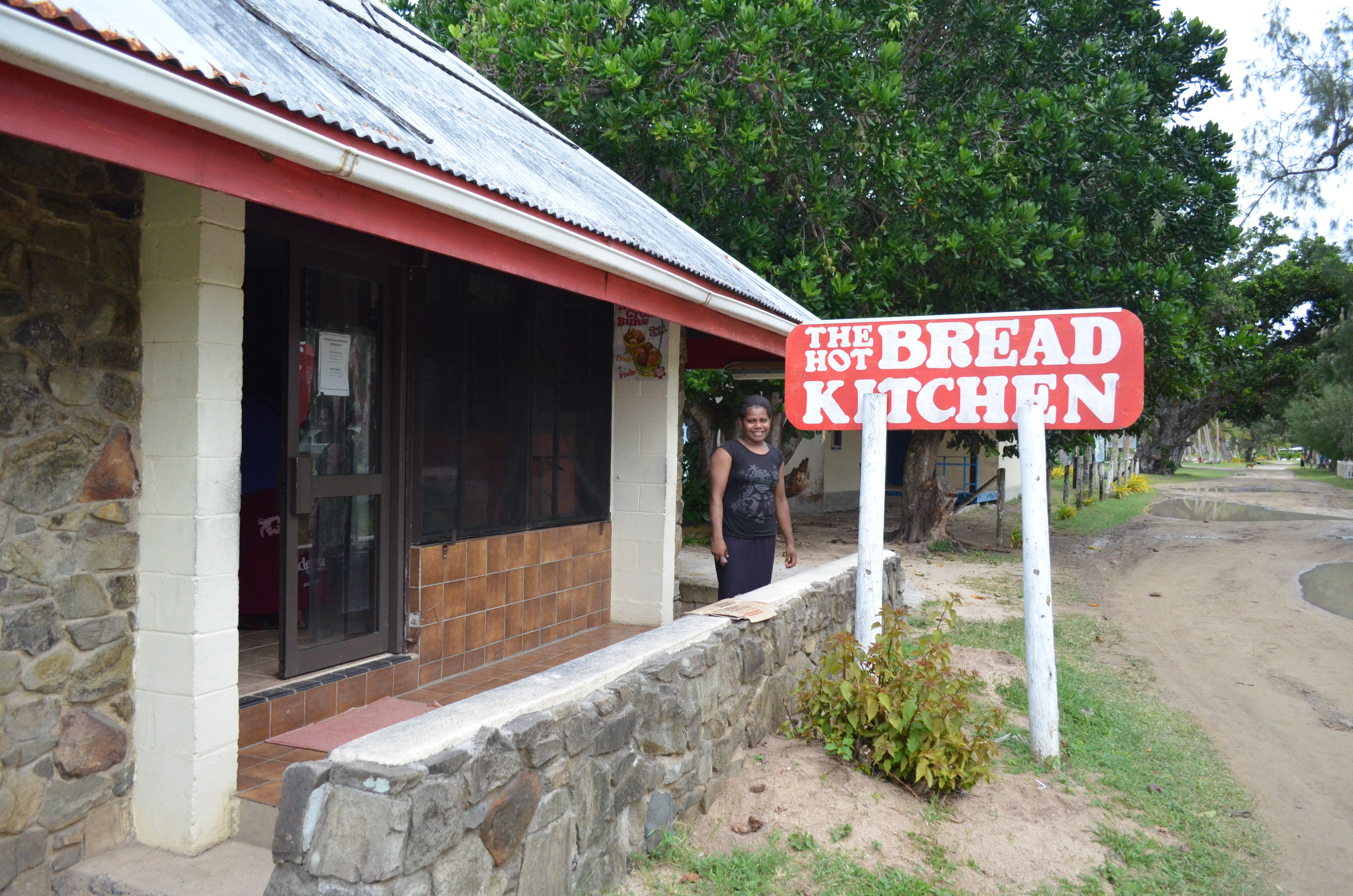
Bakery on Lomaloma, Vanua Balavu, Fiji.

Lomaloma is known in Fiji for a popular song called Lomaloma na toba vakaloloma, sung by various local Fijian artists and bands, and also a popular pub song. The song was composed by Ratu, Tevita Uluilakeba, Tui Nayau, and the father of Ratu, Sir Kamisese Mara.

== Public establishments ==
The government establishments on the northern part of the island include Adi Maopa Primary and Secondary Schools, Ratu Sukuna's now-former home base at Delana, a hospital with associated quarters for doctors and nurses, a police post, and a post office.

== See also ==
- List of reduplicated place names
