= Tuvuca =

Island in Fiji

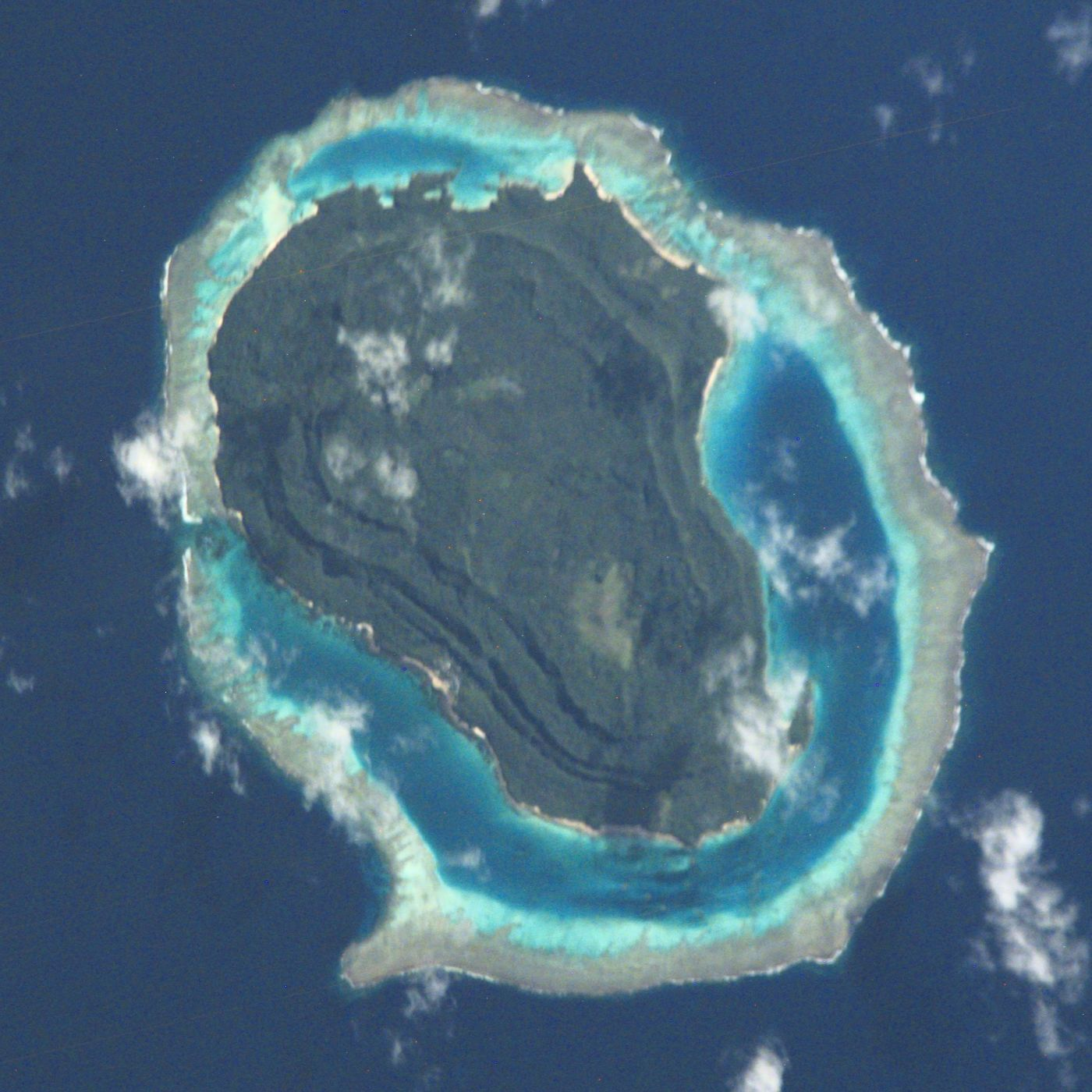
- NASA astronaut image of Tuvuca (Thuvutha) island, Lau Archipelago, Fiji

- Location within Fiji

Geography
- Location: South Pacific Ocean
- Coordinates: 17.676008°S 178.8401702°W
- Archipelago: Lau Islands
- Adjacent to: Koro Sea
- Highest elevation: 240 m (790 ft)

Administration
- Fiji
- Division: Eastern
- Province: Lau
- District: Lomaloma
- Largest settlement: Tuvuca

Demographics
- Population: 180

Tuvuca (pronounced [tuˈβuða]) is a small island off Vanua Balavu in Fiji's Lau archipelago. It is a densely wooded and inhabited island and rises 800 feet (240 metres) above sea level at the highest point. There is only one village on the island, which has a population of around 180 people. There is a primary school. Tuvuca has untapped deposits of phosphate.

== Chiefly titles ==
Tuvuca is part of the Tikina of Lomaloma and the chiefly title of this island is held by the Tui Tuvuca, which is generally held in personal union by the reigning Turaga na Rasau. The Village Chief of Tuvuca holds the title of Ramasi, it was this chiefs ancestors who gave the title to the Rasau of Lomaloma because he brought peace to Tuvuca and stopped a long-standing feud.

== Bibliography ==
- The Fiji Islands: A Geographical Handbook - Page 308, by Ronald Albert Derrick - 1951, reference to Tuvuca Island also a sketch of the Island.
- Memoirs of the Bernice Pauahi, Bishop Museum of Polynesian Ethnology and Natural History - Page 240, by Bernice Pauahi Bishop Museum - 1949.
- The Pacific Way: A Memoir - Page 9 and 69, by Kamisese Mara - 1997, references to Tuvuca Island.
- Desperate Voyage by John Caldwell page 269 to 311
