= Matanivanua =

Within the Fijian nation, Matanivanua is the name of a Mataqali (clan). The Fijian word means "eye of the land". This clan is renowned as eloquent and articulate in speaking on behalf of the land and their chief.

When a chiefly presentation of a sevusevu is performed, only this clan can do it. They speak on behalf of the chief and all others in his or her chiefdom.

== See also ==
- Fijian traditions and ceremonies
