= Lasakau sea warriors =

The Lasakau Sea Warriors were a 19th-century warrior sub-culture in the pre-colonial state of Bau, in Fiji. The sea warriors were instrumental in spreading Bau's political power throughout the South Pacific archipelagic islands. The rise of the eminent islet of Bau amongst other embryonic states was due mainly to the projection of sea power through its naval forces. Bauan chief Ratu Loaloadravu Tubuanakoro was praised by French Captain Dumont D'Urville in May 1827 for his geographic knowledge of the Fijian archipelago signifying Bau's naval influence. More far-ranging than Bau's land warriors led by the Vusaradave clan, the Lasakau clan became the leading proponents of war and tribute for the emerging island kingdom. They became known as the Bai kei Bau or 'War fence of Bau'. Sahlins made the crucial observation that," The kings of Bau based their rule not on native cultivators but on native sailors and fishers-which is to say in Fijian categories, as in political strategies, not on the land but on the sea". This was the great political transformation that catapulted Bau to power over other pre-colonial kingdoms.

Fleet of Fijian Drua, double-hulled canoes, as sailed by Lasakau Sea Warriors. Sketch 1855.

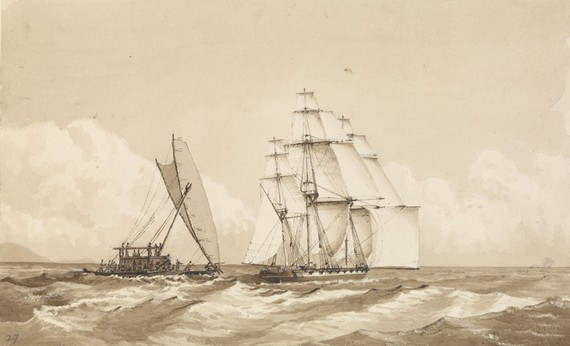
Drua off Moala Island approaches HMS Daphne 1849.

The fleet of Thakombau sailed out this morning with not less than 200 warriors on board each canoe. -Rev. Walter Lawry, a missionary, 1847.

The Lasakau clan was traditionally the fishermen of Bau. They were also renowned as seafarers. The name , "Lase-kau", intepreted as reef-wood, for during sea battles, the clan often tied their canoes together, to form an artificial reef, or floating island. The leading families of Lasakau as purveyors of sea bounty and wealth married into Bauan royalty. They became key allies in the competing chiefly intrigues that shaped Fiji's pre-colonial political landscape.Bauan maritime supremacy rose over other nascent tribal kingdoms by the use of the Lasakau people with their skills. Christian missionaries and British colonisers later consolidated Bauan political influence as the conduit of Western civilization in the Fiji Islands.

== Bau history and ethnology ==
The importance of Bauan history to pre-colonial Fiji has often been emphasised by scholars. In tracing its ascendency, Scarr succinctly posits, "The rise of Bau was rapid, and was due partly to the natural ability of her chiefs, and partly to the advantages gained from the first use of firearms. The Bau chiefs claimed descent from certain elements of the Fijian mythtiical Nakauvadra mountain range migration. Whom, having come to Verata, divided and wandered widely; in the final stage of their wanderings they settled, in comparatively recent times, on the coast near their present island, then named Ulu-ni-vuaka (The Pig's Head)."The Kubuna people on Bau (Ulu-ni-vuaka) island became embroiled in a struggle for power involving their chiefs that subsequently involved other tribal kingdoms of Fiji. The relationship between the Roko Tui Bau as sacred King and the Vunivalu of Bau as his warlord hence underwent a role inversion in the early nineteenth century.

Lasakau Village, Bau Island late 1800s with Viwa Island in background.

Originally Bau island was occupied by the Butoni people, then not formally referred to as Bau, a predatory tribe of sailors and traders. In around 1760, a wondering warlord Nailatikau seized what was known to some as Ulu-ni-vuaka, expelled the Butoni and the Lovoni people, after failing to gain favour from the Ratu in Verata as his supposed successor. The expelled group moved east occupying neighboring islands, some further east establishing settlements in parts of Lau and Cakaudrove. The Butoni however, neither admit defeat remained solitary and independent although some offer their services to Seru in his plight lending a canoe or two. On the other hand the actions on Nailatikau and a few of his liniage gabe rise to the name Cakobau, and the new name for the island "Bau", which in its original dialect means "go" or "gone".

The Vunivalu of Bau, Nailatikau was succeeded by Banuve, who, during a period of nearly thirty years, consolidated the young state's position and carried out an ambitious scheme of improvements to the island. He reclaimed wide areas of the adjacent reef flats, and built stone canoe-docks and sea-walls as a protection against erosion. To provide manual labour, he requested Lasakau people of the Yavusa Nabou who supposedly trace their roots to Delailasakau Naitasiri

Ratu Pope Seniloli the Vunivalu of Bau (1883–1936), in his sworn statement at the Native Lands Commission in 1933 for the Village of Lasakau asserted, Ai tokatoka ka liu ko Nacokula. Sa bula eso na kena kawa. (The leading family is of the household Nacokula. The descendants are alive).Oi rau vata ko Nacokula kei Nadrukuta (Nacokula and Nadrukuta are of the same household). A vale ruarua koya e rau i liuliu ni kai Lasakau kece edaidai. (These two households are the present leaders of all the Lasakau people) There is strong genealogical and traditional evidence that suggests that the ancestors of these two households originated from within the Tui Kaba Vunivalu clan and not the Nabou Tunidau ni Bau clan as made out. In all likelihood the 'Mataqalikira' were half brothers and first cousins of Ratu Seru Cakobau given the contention for power that was rife within the Vunivalu clan at the zenith of Bauan political struggles from 1800 to the Battle of Kaba in 1855.

In fact in his detailed drawing of the Islet of Bau in 1856 Joseph Waterhouse (minister) singles out Cakobau and Lasakau chief Kolivisawaqa II, also known as Kamikamica, and son of Ratu Loaloadravu Tubuanakoro who was also known as Kolivisawaqa, the elder half brother of Cakobau, residential sites or yavus from all others, signifying their high status in Bauan society. McGillivray described Kolivisawaqa's house Nacokula as " the neatest he has seen in Fiji, with a number of chests of drawers, some trunks and other European goods in it."

French Captain Dumont D'Urville in his 1827 expedition of the Fiji archipelago, was amazed at Tubuanakoro's seafaring skills and knowledge of the group of islands when Cakobau's elder half brother acted as pilot on board his ship the Astrolabe. Captain D'Urville was particularly taken by Tubuanakoro's "dignity and intelligence, gentle manners, agreeable appearance and accommodating character".

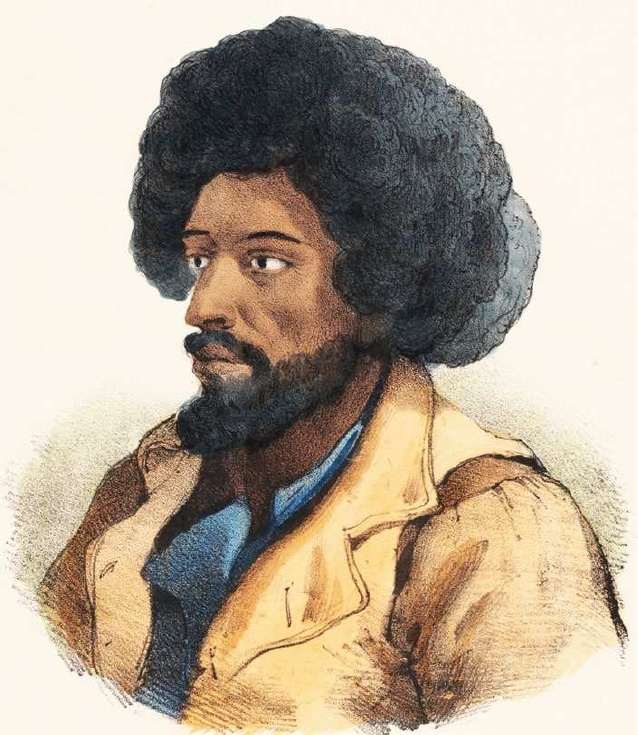
Ratu Loaloadravu Tubuanakoro, portrait 1827 aboard French Brig Astrolabe.

The surname 'Kamikamica' or 'sweet' that survives in the Nacokula household today is an allusion to the personable, genial and gracious character of Ratu Loaloadravu Tubuanakoro alias Kolivisawaqa I. He was slain by Bauan rebels in antipathy to his father Ratu Tanoa Visawaqa's rule as Vunivalu. Tubuanakoro's son was also named ' Kolivisawaqa II to immortalize the fallen chief. According to another source Kolivisawaqa as chief of Lasakau was killed by his brother Tutekovuya because of Koli's loyalty to the deposed Vunivalu Ratu Tanoa. Osbourne mentions Koli as “Rev Lorimer Fison knew a Lasakauan, whose admiring countrymen, to give him his due, called him, Kolivisawaqa. Warrior and club went on to fame together”. Another of Ratu Tubuanakoro's son was Ratu Vuniani Vukinamualevu (1819-1888) who was also Roko Tui Ba in the 1880s. Owing to his chiefly lineage and nursing the plotted murder of his father, Ratu Vuki was often at odds with Ratu Cakobau and the colonial administration.

== Warlords ==
Capell in his study of Fijian history stated that, "the history of Fiji is the history of chiefly families". The phrase in fact emphasized the hierarchical nature of Fijian traditional society where chiefly power was absolute. The relationship between Chiefs and Westerners in especially Missionaries thus became a focal point for gathering insight into Fijian culture and tradition in the nineteenth century. On the rise of the Matanitu of Bau, David Routledge pointed out that the ".. support of the Lasakau was necessary to stability on Bau, even though they were not of the ruling family". Adolf Brewster described the Lasakau as ... “the Royal Fishermen, a highly important and powerful clan, who like our Marines were soldiers and sailors too, as they were warriors in addition to their ordinary calling.” The feats of the warmongering Lasakau tribe became widespread and abhorred by Missionaries such as Reverend Williams who stated, "The Lasakau people especially, were widely known as dangerous men (tamata rerevaki)".."Very bloodthirsty and cruel". Reverend Jagger said of the Lasakau, " much feared on that account, the circumstance of them having plenty of canoes at their command enables them the more effectively to carry their schemes into practice".

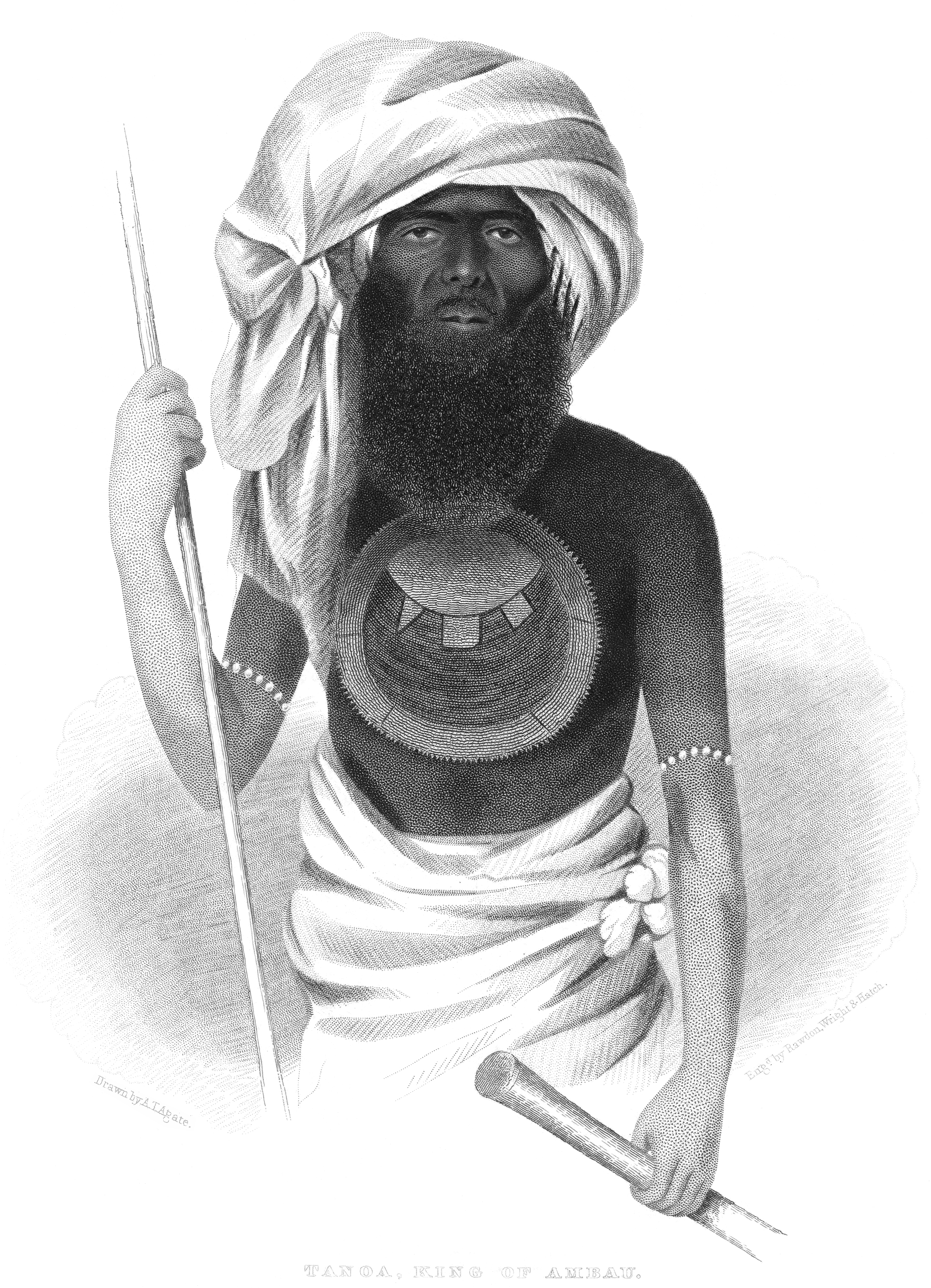
Ratu Tanoa Visawaqa, Vunivalu of Bau. (1929-52)

The introduction of firearms in tribal skirmishes by Bau added to their naval superiority. From 1803 to 1829, during Ratu Naulivou's reign as Vunivalu of Bau, the islet kingdom reached the zenith of its power. Naulivou recruited European beachcombers as mercenaries into his Bauan forces and was able to make good use of this advantage to further his political control. Mercenary Charlie Savage fought alongside Bauan forces in many skirmishes and was given the title Koroinavunivalu. He terrorized Bau's enemies with his musketry though this did not spare him from the club. In 1813 he was ambushed along with others in the sandalwood trade skirmishes in Bua, Vanua Levu. At the time of Naulivou's death though, Bau was well on the way to establishing a Fiji-wide political hegemony founded on sea power and western fire arms.

During the reign of Naulivou (1803–1829) probably around 1810, there was an internal power struggle in Lasakau due to the rise of the Tui Kaba Vunivalu as the premiere chief in Bau. This led to the banishment of the sacred king, the Vuaniivi Roko Tui Bau to Vanua Balavu, Lau. See Turaga na Rasau. This inversion of the chiefly role led to drawn out internal strife on the island. In Lasakau, the Tunidaunibau clan succumbed to the Mataqalikira. The Mataqalikira supported the Tui Kaba Vunivalu in the overthrow of the Roko Tui Bau. This struggle continued during the time of Ratu Tanoa Visawaqa and his son Ratu Seru Epenisa Cakobau. Riven with intra-tribal schisms, a faction of the Tui Kaba had ousted Ratu Tanoa as Vunivalu. In 1837, Ratu Seru re-installed his father Tanoa through a plot with the Lasakau Mataqalikira headed by Tutekovuya.

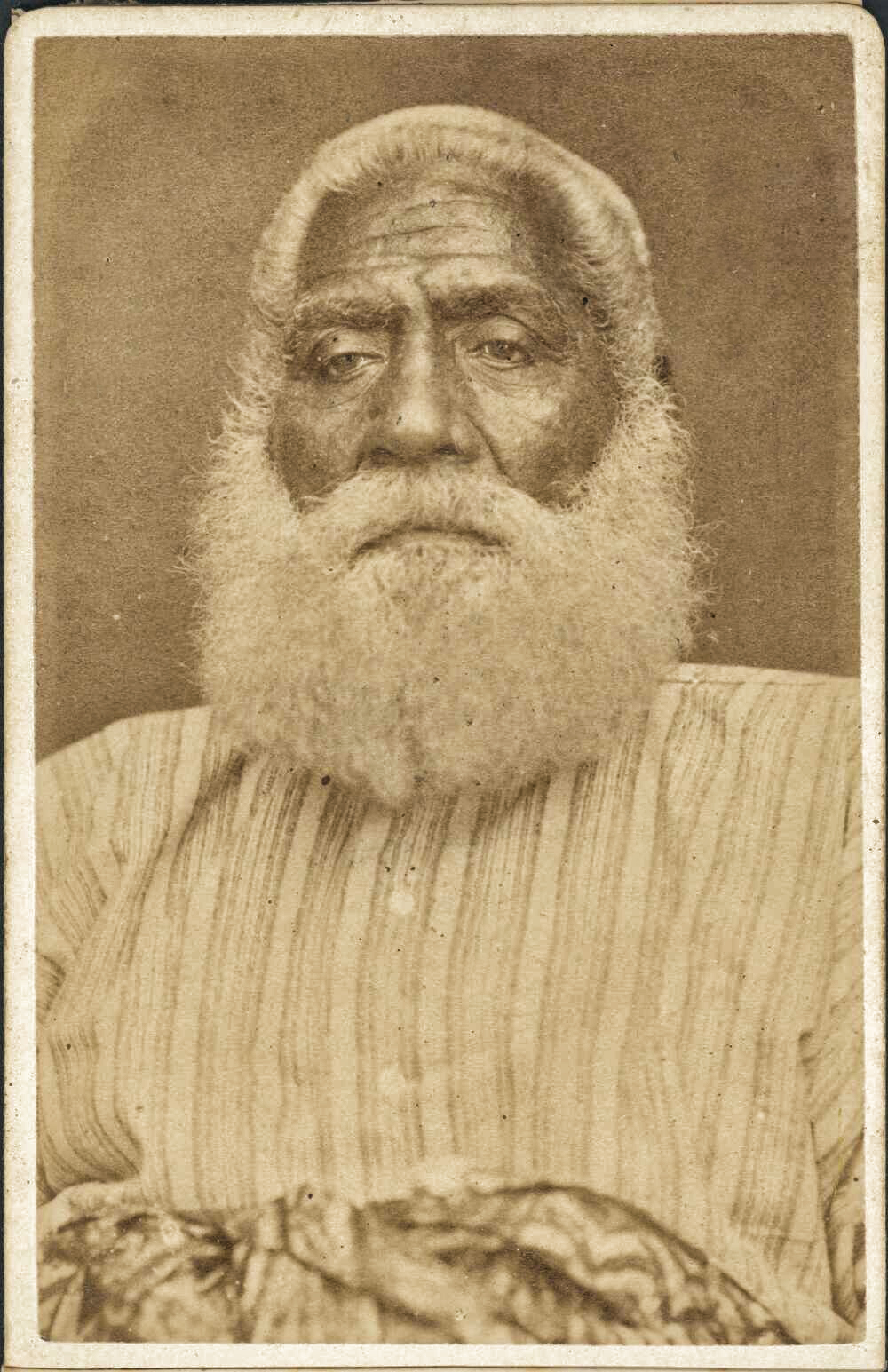
Ratu Seru Apenisa Cakobau Vunivalu of Bau. (1852-1883)

Around the early nineteenth century the contention for ascendency in the Kubuna hierarchy of Bau between the Roko Tui Bau and the Vunivalu Tui Kaba spilled over to Lasakau. The Tunidaunibau who were loyal to the Roko Tui Bau was overpowered by the Mataqalikira. This subversion of the Roko Tui Bau by the Tui Kaba Vunivalu was gained and alliance with the Mataqalikira sealed by marriages to Bauan ladies of rank.

Sahlins typifies this relationship of the Sea warriors or Kai wai and the paramount chief as, "always of outside origin and condition, considered different people or Kai tani, even when long established within the chiefdom, such service are attached to the paramount service by founding gift of a royal daughter". However, there is genealogical evidence that suggests that the chiefly male ancestors of Nacokula and Nadrukuta were indeed descendants of the Vunivalu Tui Kaba line from Ratu Tanoa Visawaqa, Ratu Caucau and Ratu Vuibureta.

Consequently, the daughters of Bau's sacred King, the Roko Tui Bau, Adi Vuniwaqa and Adi Sivo and Adi Litiana of the Tui Kaba, were betrothed to Lasakau chiefs; Caucau, Tutekovuya and Kolivisawaqa II . In addition, Adi Loloakubou the half sister of Cakobau was given as a bride to notorious Lasakau chief Ratu Gavidi. This traditional marriage is vividly captured by Mary Wallis in 1851. Adi Kaunilotuma of the Tui Kaba clan was also later given to Ratu Isoa Tuituba son of Gavidi.

Ratu Gavidi Lasakau Chief 1840s.

== Power struggles ==
The rise of the Mataqalikira clan of Lasakau began with Ratu Tubuanakoro alias Kolivisawaqa I, Tutekovuya and Tuisavura alias Gavidi. In 1832 Ratu Tubuanakoro, vasu to Gau and Cakobau's half brother, was slain by rebels on Bau who were against his Father Tanoa's rule. Routledge's account of Tubuanakoro's demise was that he was disposed of by his half brother Tutekovuya. Tubuanakoro through his mother and first wife of Tanoa, Adi Vereivalu was vasu levu to the Takala- i- Gau clan, of Sawaike. Ratu Tubuanakoro with his army of Lasakau marauders, hence had great authority over Gau island and the Lomaiviti group of islands as a whole. As Tanoa's trusted collector of tribute and wealth this may have led to his demise at the hands of rebels including his half brother Tutekovuya, the vasu-i- Tamavua Naitasiri. Ratu Nalila and his father Maibole of the Tunidaunibau then later deposed Tutekovuya in 1840. Tutekovuya was the Lasakau leader and co-conspirator with Ratu Seru Cakobau's in 1837, where Bau was destroyed and Ratu Tanoa restored as the Vunivalu. Tutekovuya is a 'ravu' name shortened for 'he that set fire to the great Bauan temple of Dulukovuya', that was bestowed on the Lasakau chief after Cakobau's successful counter-coup. The support of the Roko Tui Dreketi to Lasakau was crucial in the success of this coup in which Tanoa the vasu to Rewa was re-installed though Cakobau was the power behind the throne. Later Ratu Gavidi then disposed of Nalila in revenge of Tute his half brother's death. Nalila from the Tunidau sub-clan was contending ascendency with Gavidi of the Mataqalikira clan among the Lasakau people. The phrase Verevakabau became synonymous with Bauan politics and the ongoing struggle for power. Through the successful coup of 1837 the name Ca ko Bau (Destroyer of Bau) was conferred upon Ratu Seru and Ga(sau)vidi upon Tuisavura II. Many recorded contacts in the 1830s and 1840s such as with Commodore Charles Wilkes, Captain John Erskine and Reverend Calvert, place Lasakau chief Gavidi as Cakobau's leading enforcer. In 1849 Captain Erskine of H.B.M. ship Havannah wrote," The town or city of Bau seems to consist of three divisions: viz; Soso, Bau, Lasakau; the latter meaning the fishermen, of whom Gavidi is chief, being next in importance to Thakombau, and his great friend."

Ratu Gavidi was later killed in battle at Verata in 1850. In an account of his death Rev Waterhouse revealed, "Two things are quite certain: first, that Cakobau was unusually anxious during the attack, and his mind seemed to be occupied with something else rather than with the battle; and, second, that as soon as Gavidi was killed, the signal was given for general retreat, after which the attack was not repeated." Another account stated that it was witnessed that Cakobau's "anxiety was high" as the Lasakau chief forayed too deep into the Veratan battle lines and "was shot in the back". His death so demoralized the Bauan army that they withdrew from the battlefield. His body was taken back to Lasakau and buried in Nadrakuta, his home which was built to honour his mother Adi Vuniwaqa the daughter of the Roko Tui Bau.

In Lasakau folklore, Cakobau's erstwhile companion Gavidi always sailed with him on the Vunivalu's war canoe the Ramarama to war. On the expedition to his last battle at Verata, Gavidi 'sailed separately' hence the surname 'Vodo vakatani' that exists in the Nadrakuta household today.

== Alliances ==
Vunivalu Ratu Seru Cakobau gave his half-sister Adi Loloakubou in marriage to Ratu Gavidi of Lasakau. Adi Loloakubou's mother was Adi Talatoka, the Radi-Levuka, the first consort of the Vunivalu Ratu Tanoa and daughter of the Tui Cakau. This marriage alliance in essence strengthened the Vunivalu's control of the Lasakau people's seafaring role as chief purveyors for the islet Kingdom. Ratu Cakobau had also promised another prominent chief, the Tui Nakelo his sister in marriage to gain his support in the war against Rewa. This he obviously reneged on, which greatly displeased the Tui Nakelo. The warrior chief of the Rewa delta in kind changed allegiance to the Roko Tui Dreketi of Rewa in opposition to Bau.

At Gavidi's death and in breaking with traditional mourning practices, the people of Lasakau pleaded with Ratu Cakobau that Adi Loloakubou, be spared the custom of wife strangulation as she was with child. Subsequently, she gave birth to a son, Ratu Isoa Tuituba. Adi Loloakubou after the death of Ratu Gavidi was later betrothed to Ratu Mara Kapaiwai (1815–59)-cousin and a fierce rival of Cakobau, and the father of Ratu Joni Madraiwiwi, (1859–1920) the leading Fijian administrator of his day.

Ratu Isoa Tuituba, the Komai Nadrukuta married Adi Litia Kaunilotuma of the Vunivalu Tui Kaba clan. Ratu Vodovakatani I, Ratu Inoke Takiveikata I, Adi Monika Tuikilakila, Adi Unaisi Lewakikau and Adi Alumeci Tatila were born from this union and ensured the Nadrukuta household prominence in Lasakau. Adi Tuikilakila was Ratu Isoa Gavidi II and Ratu Inoke Takiveikata's II mother. Ratu Inoke was acting vice-president of Fiji in the 1990s. As Vasu Levu to Lasakau Ratu Inoke was honoured as Komai Nadrukuta. He was married to Adi Sainimili Rokoyau of Lomanikoro Rewa. Adi Lewakikau married Ratu Saimone Mumulovo Dobui of the chiefly household of the Tora Naibati Clan of Naibati, Buretu Tailevu. Ratu Ilaitia Kalokalolevu, Adi Alumeci Tatila and Ratu Apenisa Nayavulagi were born from this union. This union further strengthened close blood ties between Ratu Cakobau and the Tora Naibati household.

Ratu Tevita Vodovakatani II, the Komai Nadrukuta (?-1990) and long time engineer on the Governor's vessel the Ramarama, was Ratu Inoke Takiveikata's I son from Roko Naisua of the Tui Moala and also blood linked to Nacokula. Ratu Vodovakatani II married Adi Asenaca Rarogo of the Nabaubau-Rokotui Bau. Their issues were Reverend Ratu Inoke Takiveikata, Adi Litia Vuniwaqa, Ratu Eroni Cinavilakeba, Adi Viniana Tuirewa, Adi Finau, Adi Qolikoro and Roko Naisua. WPC 742, Adi Litia Vuniwaqa was one of the first Fijian female police officers passing-out in December 1970.

The arranged marriage of women of status to gain or seal political alliances was often practised by monarchies in ancient times. Hence Bauan ladies of the Roko Tui Bau and the Tui Kaba were likewise married off to chiefly households of Rewa, Naitasiri, Cakaudrove and Lau. Similarly through such marriages the chiefly clans of the Tui Ba- Nailaga, Takala i Gau of Sawaieke, Gau island, Tovulailai Nairai, Vione Gau, Qarani Gau and the Tui Moala of Naroi, Moala are kinsmen to the chiefs of Lasakau. In fact, the surname 'Kamikamica' and the yavu name 'Nacokula' are still used by the chiefs of Sawaike, Naroi, Dravo, Beqa and Nailaga today. These strategic familial links reinforced Bauan supremacy on the western coast of Viti Levu, Lomaiviti and the yasayasa Moala Lau group of islands. Ratu Seru Cakobau is said, to have been reared as a child, on Gau island in Lomaiviti and Moala island in Lau.

== Honours ==
Tubuanakoro (1803-1832), chief of Lasakau and son of Tanoa, for his warrior prowess was bestowed the title Koli-visawaqa I by Tanoa Visawaqa, ‘Burner of Boats’, who reigned from 1829 to 1852 as the Vunivalu of Bau. Koli was Tanoa's leading warrior during the struggle and banishment of the Roko Tui Bau Vuaniivi from Bau. This struggle and inversion of the chiefly hierarchy invariably escalated to wars with the kingdoms of Verata and Rewa.

The Bauans had a penchant for bestowing honorific titles on their more accomplished warriors as prefixes to their names or yaca ni ravu. The names Koli,Koroi and Waqa are the more exalted prefixes. Furthermore, the title Koli is the prefix for a slayer of ten and 'visa' for a slayer of twenty. The title "Kolivisawaqa" I as an example was bestowed on Lasakau and Bauan chief Rabonu alias Ratu Tubuanakoro. Through the main support of Kolivisawaqa I and his Lasakau clan, the Vunivalus Naulivou and Tanoa gained ascendency in the eastern parts of the Fiji archipelago.

Again the name of Lasakau chief Gavidi is a yaca ni ravu and short for 'Gasauvidi'. The name is an allusion to the burning arrows and reed fences set ablaze by the Lasakau on the night of the 1837 coup that re-installed Cakobau's father Tanoa as Vunivalu. Gavidi was Cakobau's main warrior during the young Tui Kaba chief's ascendency. Both their mothers Adi Vuniwaqa and Adi Savusavu were of the Roko Tui Bau. Adi Vuniwaqa was earlier betrothed to Ratu Caucau son of Vunivalu Ratu Banuve. Out of that union came Ratu Nayagodamu and Adi Litia Vatea.

== Clash with Christianity ==
Kolivisawaqa's I son, Ratu Viliame Kamikamica aka Kolivisawaqa II succeeded Gavidi after his death at Verata in April 1850. His siding with Ratu Cakobau and King George of Tonga's Christian forces at the Battle of Kaba (1855) was critical to the defeat of rebel forces led by Ratu Mara Kapaiwai and Ratu Ravulo of the Vusaradave. This was initially not the case. As told by Rev Calvert, "I feared that danger was at hand, mainly, I thought, through Koli-i-Visa Wanq-qa [sic] head chief of the Bau fishermen who was holding intercourse with Mara the rebel chief who had joined the King of Rewa." Cakobau realising the dire predicament he was in urged Rev Calvert, "There is one thing that may be useful, do you keep close intercourse with Koli." Apparently, Cakobau was weary of intra-Tui Kaba conspiracy for the title of Vunivalu given that Kolivisawaqa II was a powerful close relative of his. Kolivisawaqa II however later joined rebel chiefs in creating dissention to Cakobau's rule. In 1859, he was captured along with other rebel chiefs, Ratu Mara Kapaiwai, Naulivou and Ratu Isikeli (Tui Viwa) for resisting the spread of Christianity.

They were tried but they escaped. Ratu Mara and Ratu Naulivou were later recaptured, tried and hung on 6 August 1859. Later Koli after being pardoned became a Christian. He eventually featured prominently in all other Bauan Christian wars and pacification campaigns in particular at Ba in the 1860s and 70s.

Bau Spirit House at Ucui Nabou and Lasakau shoreline scene. Viwa Island in background. From a drawing by Lieut. Conway Shipley 1848.

Cakobau to maintain Kolivisawaqa's loyalty, according to Rev. Calvert, was given as a wife Adi Litiana (daughter of Ratu Masivesi another son of Tanoa) of the Tui Kaba. Out of this union came a son, Ratu Viliame Kamikamica I(1869-1944)whose eldest son was Ratu Maika Rabonu from Adi Lewamoqe. Ratu Viliame also later married Adi Mere Kula of the Masau clan and later Adi Litia Raikoro of the Tui Cakau of Somosomo Taveuni. From Adi Litia he had seven children: Adi Litiana, Ratu Filimoni, Ratu Sakiusa, Ratu Viliame, Ratu Filimoni II, Ratu Lele and Adi Wati. From Adi Mereoni Kula of the Masau, Kamikamica had a son Ratu Pio Tini(1887-1928) and a daughter Adi Stela. Ratu Pio and Adi Stella were born in Levuka and their Christian names signify that they were most probably baptized in the Roman Catholic faith.

This was probably due to Kolivisawaqa's falling-out period with Cakobau and the Wesleyan missionaries. Many chiefs after the Battle of Kaba in 1855 still sided with rebel Bau chief Ratu Mara Kapaiwai. They saw Wesleyanism as a Cakobau and Tongan conspiracy for political supremacy. This was one of the reasons for some high chiefs opting to convert to Roman Catholicism. Furthermore, Koli's move to adopting Catholicism would have stemmed more from a political motive due to the Wesleyan missionaries abhorrence of his tribe's pillaging and plundering, the raison d'etre, of Lasakau's sea warriors. Ratu Maika had four daughters who married into other noble houses of other provinces. Adi Sainimili Lewamoqe married the Tui Ba, Adi Mereani Salele married Ro Etuate Navakamocea Mataitini, the Vunivalu of Rewa. Adi Mereoni Nawaibau, and Adi Josivini Maisavu also married into leading Kubuna clans.

Kamikamica's I son Ratu Pio Tini Kamikamica had three son's and two daughters. Ratu Viliame Kamikamica III (1915–64) and Adi Kelera Kataogo (1912-1985) followed from his union with Silafaga Paniani on (1876–1918) of the Ainu'u Maliatoa clan of Sapapali'i village Savaii Samoa in June 1911 and another son, Ratu Qionikoro whose mother was a Ms Wedlock. Kamikamica's I daughters, Adi Stela was married to Ratu Filimoni Loco, Tui Sawakasa and had a son Ratu Ovini Loco. His youngest daughter was Rokonaisua from a lady of Naroi Moala.

Ratu Viliame Kamikamica III had two children from Teuila Tunufai Selio of Sale'aula village Savaii Samoa, Adi Silafaga and Ratu Alisada Vodo Kamikamica. Ratu Viliame Kamikamica's III second marriage to Sala Ahome'e-a half-sister of Queen Mata'aho of Tonga produced two children, Ratu Jiale Kamikamica and Adi Kelera Kamikamica.

== Colonies of Bau ==
The Lasakau fishermen were in essence the Bauan navy. These sea warriors projected nascent Bauan traditional power throughout eastern Fiji. As seafarers their dominating reach by the use of huge sailing war canoes established Bauan colonies in various villages on Gau, Moala, Vanuabalavu, Nairai and coastal Tailevu and Ba. The earlier banished Butoni and Levuka people of Bau also settled in Taveuni, Macuata, Koro, Lakeba and Kadavu. These sea people formed a network of colonies and auxiliaries of the islet kingdom of Bau. Hence well beyond the tiny islet's horizon, Bau was able to levy food, traditional wealth and more importantly war canoes through the Lasakau sea warriors. From these kinsmen villages all over the Fiji Islands, Bau was able to sub-jugate contending chiefdoms and extract tribute.

== Tanoa and the Rise of the Matanitu of Kubuna i Wai ==
Much of our understanding of pre-contact Fijian history has been interpreted through the observations and writings of missionaries such as Reverends Williams, Calvert and Waterhouse from the cockpit of Bauan culture and tradition. Indeed, the rise of Bau as the leading Fijian chiefdom in the first half of the nineteenth century was closely witnessed by these pioneering missionaries and their women folk such as Mary Wallis. Their understanding of unfolding events on Bau were often taken at face value without the full knowledge of intra familial intrigue afoot at the time.

This is an account of the untold story of the rise to power of the Vunivalu Ratu Tanoa Visawaqa through the Lasakau sea warriors and the matanitu of Kubuna i Wai primarily gleaned from the Native Land Commission's Tukutuku raraba for Lasakau. It was accepted that Kubuna i wai was a maritime territory aligned to the matanitu of Kubuna centred on Bau. The area mainly consisted of islands in the Lomaiviti group and yasayasa Moala. The origin of the political entity of Kubuna i wai was due in the main to the rise of Tanoa and was centred in the neighbouring fishermen village of Lasakau. Tanoa's Kubuna i wai chiefdom had rivalled Bauan traditional hegemony from about 1820–1855.

This intra-tribal Tui Kaba conflict led to the 1832 usurpation and seven year banishment of Tanoa. Since European contact in the early nineteenth century the position of Bauan war lord had gained significant power along Fiji's eastern coast and windward islands. Sibling vasu rivalry was rife for the title of Vunivalu. Tanoa it seems had set up a rival chiefdom to his brother Naulivou's Bauan chiefdom in Lasakau. Prior to succeeding his brother Naulivou at Muaidule, Bau as Vunivalu in 1829, Tanoa had led the Lasakau sea marauders as chief purveyor of tribute throughout the Fiji islands. The role had given Tanoa great wealth and prestige and naturally he became a rival to his brother. It is said that a scar at the back of his head was from Naulivou's war club. In fact through the leadership prowess of Tanoa, Lasakau supported by its colonies in Lomaiviti, Moala and Ba became a rival chiefdom to Naulivou and Bau.

The traditional account of Naulivou's demise was that he died as a result of an outbreak of a European disease hence his posthumous name ‘Ramatenikutu'. Another account, however, states Tanoa had plotted his demise. Tanoa had previously built his main residence where he housed the first of his nine wives Adi Vereivalu in Lasakau. His imposing residence, known as Nacokula was replete with its own docking bay and overflowed with tributes from afar. Because of his terrorizing tactics and fierceness for extracting tribute he was bestowed the name ‘Visawaqa’-the burner of boats. Tanoa's eldest son from Vereivalu was Ratu Loloadravu Tubuanakoro who was vasu to the chiefdom of Sawaike on Gau Island. He was renowned as a sailor/navigator. As was customary he was bestowed the warrior name Kolivisawaqa obviously in honour of his father. In the 1856 Rev Waterhouse plan of the island of Bau, the largest yavu in Lasakau of Nacokula was labelled as Kolivisawaqa's (alias Kamikamica and grandson of Tanoa) residence.

One of the more significant historical event of the nineteenth century in Fijian folklore was Ratu Seru and the Lasakaun internal coup of 1837 that was to define Bauan and indeed Fijian traditional politics into the future. What is unclear is the internal relationship and dynamics that underpinned this significant historical event.

In 1832 riven with intra tribal competition Tanoa was banished from the island by a competing faction from within his Tui Kaba clan. In addition Tanoa's son Tubuanakoro was murdered as a result of this purge. It is said Seru who was in his early teen was not seen as a threat hence his life was spared and he was left to his youthful pursuits on the island. In the next five years however, young Seru set about the plot to restore his father Tanoa as Vunivalu. The plot gained an immediate hold in Lasakau the centre of Tanoa's Kubuna i wai chiefdom. Apparently the Lasakauns were eager to avenge Tubuanakoro Kolivisawaqa's death at the hands of Tanoa's enemies. The native Bauan poem immortalizing the rise of Cakobau as translated into English in Reverend Joseph Waterhouse's pioneering historic work, The King and people of Fiji, is perhaps the closest insider account of the 1837 counter-revolution on the island. The poem from oral tradition encode verse meaning with the use of allegory and allusion known only to those knowledgeable of Bauan political and intra-tribal intrigues of the time.

In memory of Cakobau [30]
I
Cakobau strolls about as if careless,
His plot is deep under the ground.
They consult, talk and are silent,
Komainavalecaqou has done wrong, (Rebel leader Tuiveikoso's war club)
He has not killed Loloadravu, (sarcasm as Tubuanakoro of Lasakau was assassinated)
Cakobau is repairing a canoe, (conspiring with his cousins Tute, Koli and Gavidi in Lasakau)
He is relashing the Tui Nayau, (a Drua and allusion to his uncle Vuibureta vasu to Lakeba) 
A raft to carry the Vunivalu's plot;
Its flags hang in ornament, (an allusion to Caucau and Vuibureta's sons; Tute, Gavidi and Mara)
The conspiracy is agreed to in Lasakau,
The chiefs of the fishermen offer to fight, (chiefs of Nacokula and Nadrukuta)
Butako-i-valu is supplied with kava; ( Lasakau God of  war)
The prayer “let Caucau die”. ( Cakobau's uncle and rebel leader of Tuiveikoso regime)

II
Cakobau and Tutekovuya;
And they two tear asunder the land,
Then roars the sound of the flames.

Apparently Seru's plot with the Lasakaun and Rewan support was well concealed. Evidently Tanoa was vasu to Rewa and had a ready army of supporters in Lasakau the centre of his Kubuna i wai chiefdom. Here indeed lies a story of family and intra-tribal intrigue. Tanoa and his son Seru were supported by the chiefs of the fishermen clan who had built for them a contending Bauan chiefdom of Kubuna i wai. The plot and intra tribal massacre in essence restored the tyrant Ratu Tanoa as Vunivalu and established his son Ratu Seru ‘Cakobau’-the destroyer of Bau as leading Fijian chief of the era. The demise of Lasakau chief's Kolivisawaqa, Tutekovuya and Gavidi of the Kubuna i wai chiefdom in 1832, 1840 and 1850 respectively at the hands of their close clansmen most probably was the outcome of the rivalry for power that prevailed at the zenith of Bauan traditional political hegemony.

== Timeline ==
- 1750: Rise of Verata, Rewa and Bau as leading chiefdoms or Matanitu.
- 1760: Lasakau and Soso clans relocated from Beqa and Kadavu to Bau islet by Vunivalu Ratu Banuve on banishment of the Butoni and Levuka clans.
- 1770: Bau and Yatu Mabua armies under Vunivalu Banuve aids Makutu in Nadroga siege.
- 1800: Vunivalu Banuve first battle of Verata with Waimaro siding with Bau.
- 1803 : Ratu Tubuanakoro aka Kolivisawaqa born.
- 1805: Vunivalu Ratu Naulivou second battle of Verata.
- 1800–1845: Lasakau's Mataqalikira gains leadership of the Nabou clan over the Tunidaunibau. Adi Vuniwaqa is given in marriage to Matagalikira chief Vuibureta in acknowledgement of battles fought.
- 1801–1814: Era of sandalwood and beechdemer trade from Vuya in Bua which involved many a native/traders skirmish and battles in which Bau was also embroiled. Charles Savage of Bau killed 1813.
- 1808: Tanoa is sent by Naulivou in pursuit of Ratu Raiwalui the Roko Tui Bau Vuaniivi at Vanuabalavu. He overcomes and kills Raiwalui the Roko Tui Bau Vuani-ivi at sea not far from Mago Island.
- 1809: On returning to Bau, Tanoa stopped at Vuna and captured an enemy town, Vuloci. Tanoa on seeing the Vuaniivi war canoes on the beach at Vuna, set fire to them and secured for himself the name Tanoa Visawaqa, or Tanoa "The burner of boats."
- 1810(?): Tutekovuya born.
- 1815(?): Tuisavura (aka Gavidi) born.
- 1817: Cakobau born.
- 1829: Vunivalu Ratu Naulivou dies. His brother Ratu Tanoa Visawaqa moves house from Nacokula to Muadule to succeed him.
- 1830?: Kolivisawaqa II aka Kamikamica I born.
- 1832: Rebels coup Ratu Tanoa who flees to Koro then Somosomo.

Ratu Tubuanakoro alias Kolivisawaqa I elder brother of Cakobau killed by Bau rebels.

- 1837: Cakobau and Tutekovuya of Lasakau destroys Bau, and sends the Roko Tui Bau, Vusaratu, Vusaradave, and Soso clans fleeing the island.
- 1838: Vunivalu Ratu Tanoa third battle of Verata led by son Ratu Cakobau.
- 1839: A flagpole is erected and flag (kuila) hoisted at Naliliwale, Lasakau to signify the victory in 1837 and return of Ratu Tanoa Visawaqa, Vunivalu ni Bau. Ratu Seru is also bestowed the name Cakobau and Tuisavura the name, Gavidi. Cakobau's eldest child, a daughter is born around this occasion and named Adi Kuila in honour of this important historic event.
- 1840: Nalila of Tunidaunibau slays Tutekovuya of Matagalikira in struggle for ascendency.
- 1840: Baun army under Ratu Cakobau in battle with Somosomo against Vuna.
- 1845: Ratu Gavidi in revenge of his half brother Tutekovuya slays Ratu Nalila and his father, Maibole of the Tunidaunibau.
- 1845: Baun army under Ratu Cakobau in Rewa battle with Roko Tui Dreketi.
- 1846: Baun army side with Somosomo in battle with Natewa.
- 30 April 1850: Gavidi chief of Lasakau killed by gunshot to his back in fourth Verata battle and is replaced by Kamikamica AKA Kolivisawaqa II, the son of Kolivisawaqa I AKA Ratu Tubuanakoro as chief.
- 8 Dec 1852: Ratu Tanoa Vunivalu dies.
- 26 July 1853: Ratu Cakobau installed Vunivalu.
- 29 April 1854: Ratu Cakobau is baptized a Christian.
- 7 June 1854: Rev Calvert visits Kolivisawaqa II on advice of Cakobau pleads to avert his support to rebels.
- Jan 1855: Ratu Qaraniqio Rewa Chief leader of Rebels dies of dysentery.
- 7 April 1855: Battle of Kaba, Lasakau, Bau, Tongan combined forces against Rewa rebels.
- 1856 Rev Waterhouse draws detailed plan of Bau locating the Vunivalu, Ratu Cakobau's and Kolivisawaqa II chiefly houses as the most prominent on the islet.
- 1859: Ratu Mara Kapaiwai- leader of Rebels is hung.
- 1868: Baun army Navosa campaign to avenge Rev Baker massacre.
- 4 March 1873: Cakobau's Royal Army siege of Nakorowaiwai Ba to avenge Lasakau chief Koroi Latikau's murder.
- March–August 1873: Cakobau's Christian forces sieges of Lovoni Ovalau and Nasorovakawalu Tholo East rebels.
- 1874: Fiji ceded to Great Britain.
- 1876: Governor Arthur Hamilton-Gordon, 1st Baron Stanmore pardons Viti Levu Hill Tribes to end Colo Wars.
- 1883: Ratu Cakobau Vunivalu dies.

== See also ==
Thalassocracy

United States Exploring Expedition#First part

== Sources ==
- Andrew Thornley, Tauga Vulaono.Exodus of the Taukei: The Wesleyan Church in Fiji 1848-74. University of the South Pacific of, Institute of Pacific Studies, 2002.
- Deryck Scarr, A History of the Pacific Islands: Passages through Tropical Time. Richmond, Surrey, UK, Curzon Press, 2001.
- NLC Tukutuku Raraba Lasakau Bau Ratu Viliame Kamikamica liuliu ni yavusa Nabou.
- David Routledge. Matanitu: the struggle for power in early Fiji 1985. Institute of Pacific Studies and the University of the South Pacific Fiji.
- Elinor Mordaunt. The Recollections, taken from "The Venture Book. Bodley Head, London, 1926.
- Sahlins, Marshall David. Apologies to Thucydides: Understanding History as Culture. University of Chicago Press, 2004.
- Thomas William. Fiji and the Fijians v.I, "The Islands and Their Inhabitants. Alexander Heylin, Paternoster Row, London, 1858. Reprint 1983 by the Fiji Museum, Suva.
