= Kubuna =

One of the three confederacies of Fiji's House of Chiefs

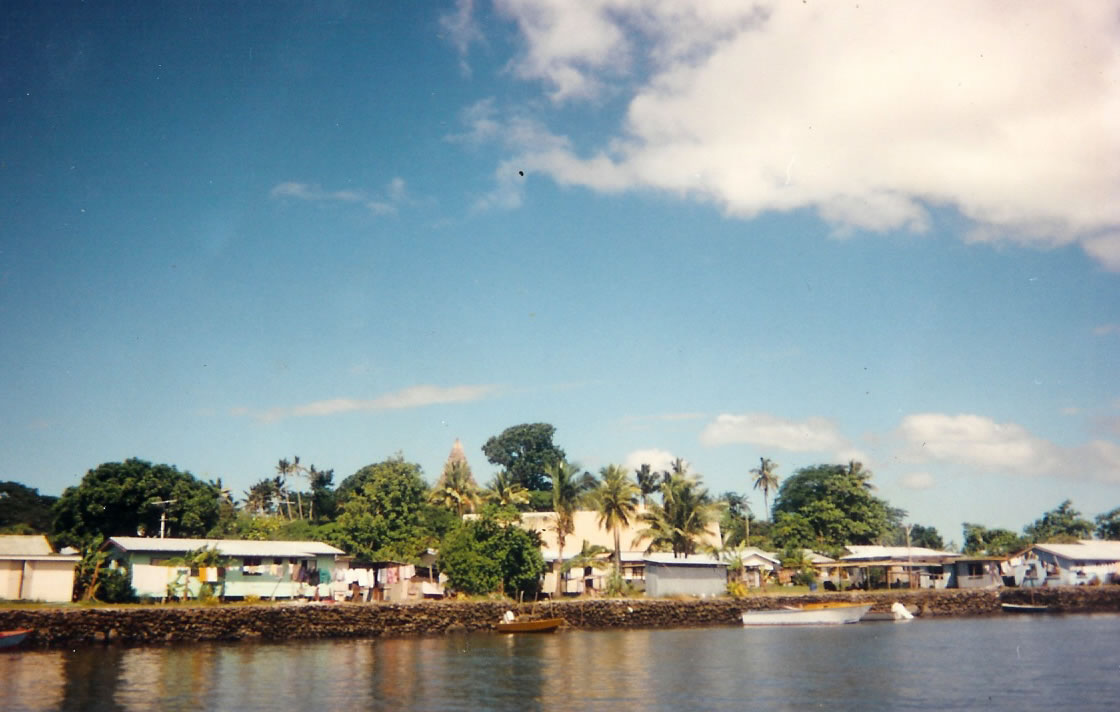
Bau Island. In the centre is the roof of the assembly hall of the Council of Chiefs of the Kubuna Confederacy

Kubuna is one of the three confederacies that make up Fiji's House of Chiefs, to which all of Fiji's chiefs belong.

== Details of Kubuna ==
It consists of the provinces of Tailevu, Naitasiri, Lomaiviti, Ra, Rotuma, and parts of the western province of Ba. Most of Kubuna is located in the northern part of Fiji's Central Division.

The capital of the confederacy is the chiefly island of Bau in Tailevu. While Kubuna is foremost the i-cavuti of Bau, the name is also shared by certain provinces or vanua that were her allies or influenced by her in the past, which are now part of the confederacy.

== Paramount Titles of Kubuna ==
The Paramount Chief of Kubuna, who is generally considered to be the highest-ranked chief in Fiji, is the 'Turaga Bale Na Tui Kaba', Vunivalu of Bau. A position that has been vacant since the death of Ratu Sir George Cakobau, a former Governor General, in 1989. Succession is not necessarily from father to son, although there is a hereditary element. Currently, there are three eligible contenders, namely Ratu George Cakobau, Jr., his brother Ratu Epenisa Cakobau, and their cousin Ratu George Kadavulevu Naulivou. It is thought that clan politics is part of the reason why none of these candidates has, yet, been installed. It is said that the nomination of Ratu George Kadavulevu Naulivou has been disqualified on the basis that his father was born out of wedlock. Also listed as a possible candidate is Fiji's former President, Ratu Epeli Nailatikau; however, he too is considered by some to be disqualified as he is only connected through maternal links being a descendant of Ratu Edward Tuivanuavou Tugi Cakobau, a product of an extra-marital liaison by Cakobau's granddaughter Adi Litia Cakobau with (the then married) King George Tupou II of Tonga.

Another high chief from Kubuna is the Roko Tui Bau, most recently Ratu Joni Madraiwiwi, the former Vice-President of Fiji who died in 2016. According to sources within the Great Council of Chiefs (a traditional body which, among other things, used to function as an electoral college to choose the President and Vice-President), he was chosen for the Vice-Presidency because it was thought that as President Ratu Josefa Iloilo was from the Burebasaga and his predecessor, Ratu Sir Kamisese Mara from Tovata, the new Vice-President should be from Kubuna. On 6 December 2006, he was ousted from office by coup leader Voreqe Bainimarama and the office of Vice-President has been suspended ever since.
