= Sawana =

Village on Vanua Balavu, Fiji

- Village
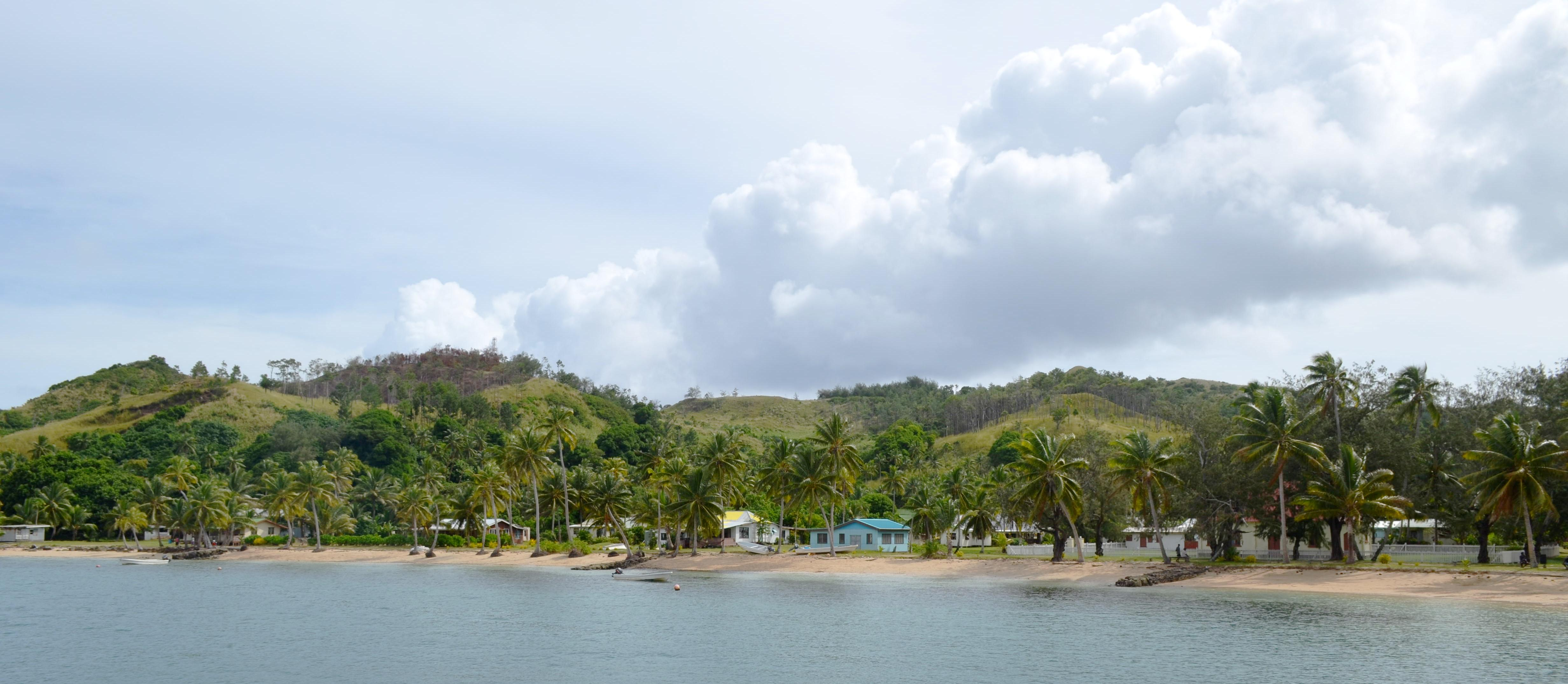
- The village of Sawana on the island of Vanua Balavu, Fiji

- Location in Fiji
- Coordinates: 17.2779766°S 179.0543828°W
- Country: Fiji
- Archipelago: Lau Islands
- Division: Eastern Division
- Province: Lau
- District: Lomaloma

Sawana is a village on the Fijian island of Vanua Balavu, in the Lau archipelago and is part of the Tikina of Lomaloma.

Sawana is separated from the main village of Lomaloma only by a large ditch. As the population is predominantly of Tongan origin, church services are conducted in Tongan, as well as Fijian.

== The selection of a high Chief ==
The nomination for the title of the Tui Lau is done in consultation between the Yavusa Tonga of Sawana and the Vuanirewa Clan. The final decision will be made by the Vuanirewa Clan in Lakeba.

Only a member of the Vuanirewa Clan is eligible to be selected and installed as the Tui Lau.

== Sources ==
- Mara, Ratu Sir Kamisese: "The Pacific Way: A Memoir", page 91. University of Hawaii Press, 1997. ISBN 978-0-8248-1893-7.
- Fiji Times Newspaper Article, Title: Fiji Born Actor dies, Content: Talks in reference to Manu Tupou the Hollywood actor, of his ties with Lomaloma with reference to Ratu Mara and Adi Mere and Ratu Dreunimisimisi, Fiji Times Saturday June 12, 2004, Fiji Times Archives.
- Why these unions were important was due to the Vasu connection that brought different tribes together following are examples documenting the Importance of the Vasu connection or maternal lineage in Fiji: as outlined in this Book ‘Matanitu’ the struggle for power in early Fiji by David Routledge 1985, published by the Institute of Pacific studies and the University of the South PacificFiji, Chapter 1 page 36, also see the Book Fiji and the Fijians By Thomas Williams, James Calvert, Ch 2 page 33,34
- Lau Islands, Fiji By A.M Hocart and Bernice P. Bishop - Museum Bulletin 62 p226, Publication Date: June 1969, Publisher: Kraus Intl Pubns, ISBN 978-0-527-02168-9 this book Documents in detail the Rasau and Ratu Keni
- Fijian Heralds and Envoys., A. M. Hocart, The Journal of the Royal Anthropological Institute of Great Britain and Ireland, Vol. 43, Jan. - Jun., 1913 (Jan. - Jun., 1913), pp. 109–118, doi:10.2307/2843163, Arthur Maurice Hocart does a comparative study on two chiefs and their heralds and envoys one being the Rasau of Lomaloma.
- 20th Century Fiji, edited by Stewart Firth & Daryl Tarte - 2001 - ISBN 982-01-0421-1, this book has a very detailed reference to Ratu Edward and Ratu Mara acknowledges their mothers
- Web link reference to Ratu Edward.
