= Turaga Na Ravunisa =

The Turaga na Ravunisa is a Fijian Chiefly title of the Lau Islands, in particular the village of Lomaloma on the Island of Vanua Balavu. The Turaga na Ravunisa is currently Mr Lepani Pulea.

== The Title ==
The title holder must be the most senior member or Turaga i Taukei of the Yavusa Gala and generally is held by a man. Initially his title will be Tui Lomaloma and he relinquishes that title upon the traditional installation when he becomes the Ravunisa. The candidate must have white hair or it is believed he will die if he is installed before his hair becomes white.

== A Brief History ==
The Ravunisa and his people originate from Mualevu from the Senimoli Family and due to a disagreement they left to reside Lomaloma.
