= Enele Maʻafu =

Tongan chief

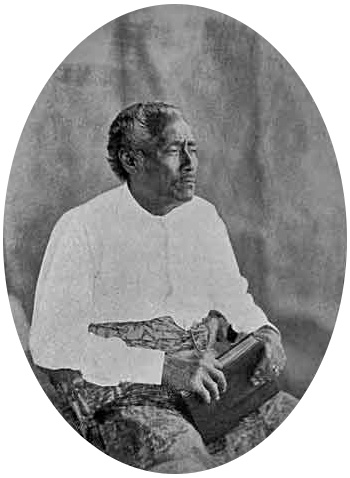
Photograph of Maʻafu in 1876.

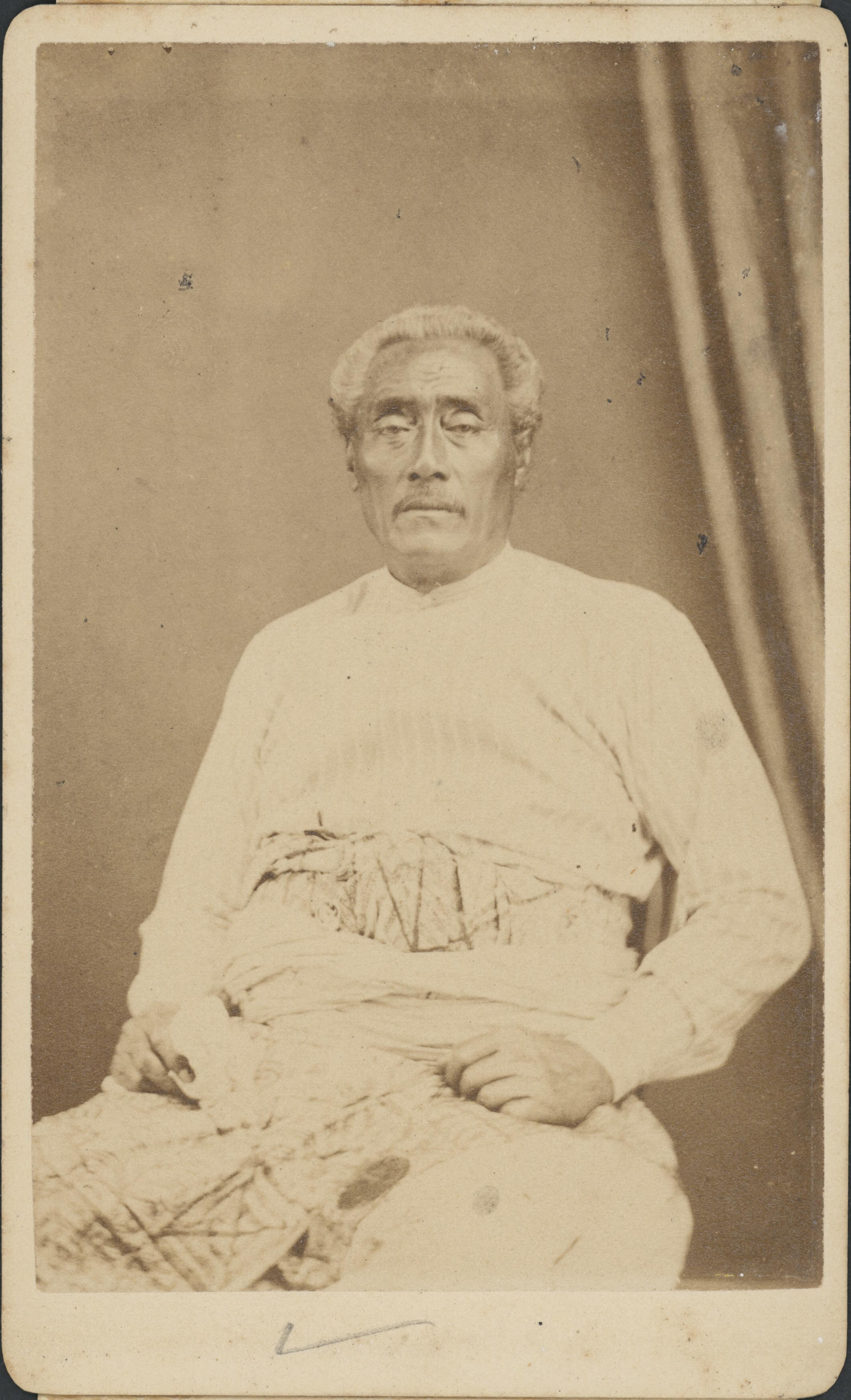
Ma'afu in the 1870s.

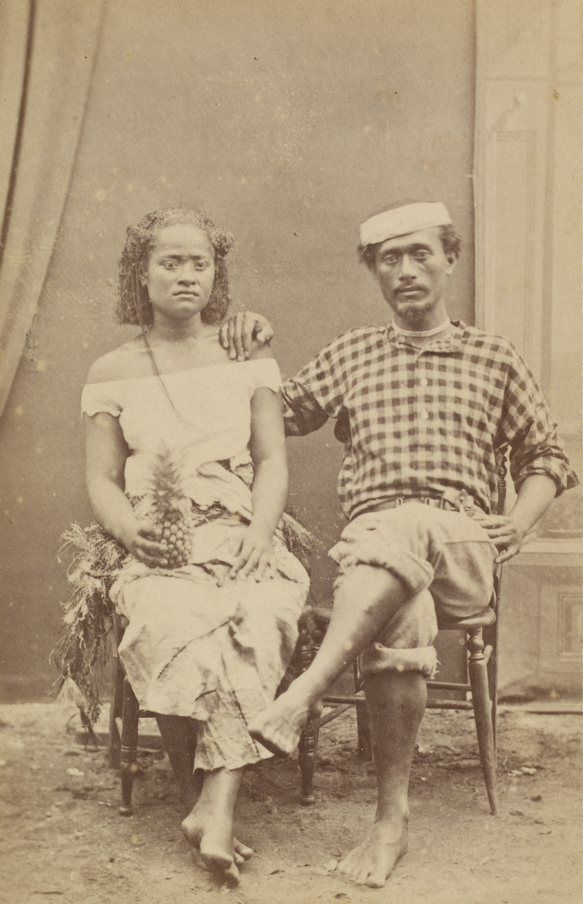
His son Siale'ataongo, called Charles Maʻafu, on the right next to his cousin Adi Tupoutuʻa.

ʻEnele Maʻafuʻotuʻitonga, commonly known as Maʻafu, (c. 1816 – 6 February 1881) was a Pacific islander who held important titles in two countries in the Pacific. He was a traditional Tongan Prince and a Fijian chief bestowed the title 'Tui Lau' in 1869 by the Turaga Tui Nayau with the support of the Vuanirewa Household. This title was ratified by a wider council of Fijian chiefs and subsequently formalised under British colonial administration. In 1847, Maʻafu went to Fiji in an expedition to Vanua Balavu to investigate the killing of a preacher.

== A Brief History ==
He was born in Tongatapu, Tonga, in 1816, as the son of Aleamotu'a, Tu'i Kanokupulu. In 1840 he married ʻElenoa Ngataialupe Lutui, with whom he had one child, Siale 'Ataongo, in Nukuʻalofa. Also a Christian, 'Enele (Henry) Ma'afu introduced Methodist Christianity to eastern Fiji. Ma'afu died 6 February 1881 in Lomaloma, Vanua Balavu, and was buried on the island of Lakeba in the chiefly village of Tubou.

== The Beginnings of his Kingdom ==
The cousin and official representative of King George Tupou I, who wished to keep him away from Tonga as a potential rival for the throne. In 1847, King Taufa'ahau of Tonga included his cousin Ma'afu in an expedition sent to Vanua Balavu to investigate the killing of a preacher. Ma'afu established himself at Lakeba as leader of the Tongan community in the Lau Islands in 1848. Aligning himself with the Tui Nayau, the Paramount Chief of the Lau Islands, he went on to conquer the Moala Islands and placed them under the Tui Nayau's authority. In 1850, Enele Ma'afu gave the Tui Cakau a canoe and in return the Tui Cakau gave the island of Vanua Balavu to Ma'afu. He went on to Vanua Balavu and took up residence in Lomaloma, after suppressing a religious war on the island. Using his alliance with the Tui Cakau and Tui Bua, or Paramount Chief of Bua, Ma'afu defeated Ritova, the Tui Macuata or Paramount Chief of Macuata, Ma'afu extended his influence through the northern island of Vanua Levu.

== War and Diplomacy ==
When Ratu Seru Epenisa Cakobau, the Vunivalu, by then the Paramount Chief of Bau, made his first offer to cede Fiji to the United Kingdom in 1858, William Thomas Pritchard, the British Consul, warned Ma'afu - by now the most powerful chief in northern Fiji - that under British rule, further attempts to expand his power base would not be tolerated. Ma'afu shrewdly signed an agreement denying sovereignty over Fijians and claiming to be in the islands only to oversee the Tongan population. Following Britain's decision in 1862 not to annex Fiji, however, Ma'afu resumed his attempts to extend his rule. In 1867, he created the Tovata Confederacy, covering most of northern and eastern Fiji. This arrangement was not a success, however, and Ma'afu retired to the island of Vanuabalavu. He maintained his claim, however, to be the overseer of the Tongan population, and when the Tui Nayau raised the Tongan flag over Lakeba, Ma'afu took control of the Lau archipelago on the pretext that its Paramount Chief had declared it be Tongan territory, rather than Fijian.

Ma'afu's personal flag as King of Lau, 1869-1871.

Ma'afu was faced with a crisis in June 1868, when the Tongan government disclaimed all sovereignty over Fijian territory, including the Lau Islands. Ma'afu could no longer exercise authority over Lau as a Tongan Prince. Lauan chiefs met in Lakeba and February 1869, and granted Ma'afu the title of Tui Lau, or King of Lau, Levuka, and Ovalau. He was subsequently recognized as such by the chiefs of Cakaudrove and Bua in May 1869. Ma'afu played a leading role in the cession of Fiji to the United Kingdom in 1874. Ma'afu has descendants living today in Tubou, Lakeba, in the Lau Islands known as the Onewai clan in Tubou, Lakeba. The large Onewai Clan live all over Fiji and around the world. He also had descendants in the Kingdom of Tonga, as Halaevalu Mataʻaho ʻAhomeʻe, the late Queen Mother.

== See also ==
- Lau Islands § History

== Bibliography ==
- Denoon, Donald; Meleisea, Malama; Firth, Stewart; et al., eds. (2004). The Cambridge History of the Pacific Islanders. Cambridge: Cambridge University Press. ISBN 978-0-521-00354-4.
- Derrick, Ronald Albert (1950). A History of Fiji. Suva: Print and Stationery Department.
- Goodwin, Bill, ed. (2004). Frommer's South Pacific. Hoboken, NJ: John Wiley & Sons. pp. 228–229. ISBN 978-0-7645-7428-3.
- Lal, Brij V.; Fortune, Kate, eds. (2000). The Pacific Islands: An Encyclopedia. Vol. 1. Honolulu: University of Hawaii Press. p. 238. ISBN 978-0-8248-2265-1.
- Lessin, Alexander Philip; Lessin, Phyllis June (1970). Village of the Conquerors, Sawana: A Tongan Village in Fiji. Eugene, OR: Department of Anthropology, University of Oregon.
- Reid, A. C. (1990). Tovata I & II. Suva: Fiji Museum. ISBN 978-982-208-001-8.
- Scarr, Deryck (2013). A History of the Pacific Islands: Passages through Tropical Time. New York: Taylor & Francis. ISBN 978-1-136-83796-8.
- Spurway, John (2015). Ma'afu, Prince of Tonga, Chief of Fiji: A Life of Fiji's First Tui Lau. Canberra: Australian National University Press. ISBN 978-1-925021-18-9. Archived from the original on 2015-07-16.
- Spurway, John T. (2001). Ma'afu: The Making of the Tui Lau. Canberra: Australian National University.
- Thomas, Julian (1886). "Maafu, Prince of Tonga". Cannibals & Convicts: Notes of Personal Experiences in the Western Pacific. London: Cassell & Company. pp. 24–27.
- Thornley, Andrew (2002). Exodus of the I Taukei: The Wesleyan Church in Fiji, 1848-74. Suva: Institute of Pacific Studies, University of the South Pacific. ISBN 978-982-02-0340-2.
