= Roko Tui Namata =

The Roko Tui Namata is the title of the Paramount Chief of the Namata district in Fiji's Tailevu Province.

The chiefly family of Namata is closely related to that of Bau, with frequent intermarriage between them. Adi Viniana Gavoka, the first wife of Ratu Sir George Cakobau, the late Governor-General and Vunivalu of Bau, was the daughter of the late Roko Tui Namata, Ratu Inoke Mara.
