= Mataqali =

Fijian clan or landowning unit

A mataqali (pronounced [mataŋˈɡali]) is a Fijian clan or landowning unit.

== See also ==
- Culture of Fiji
- Fijian traditions and ceremonies
