= Tovata =

One of the three confederacies of Fiji's House of Chiefs

Coordinates: 16°46′34″S 178°36′04″E

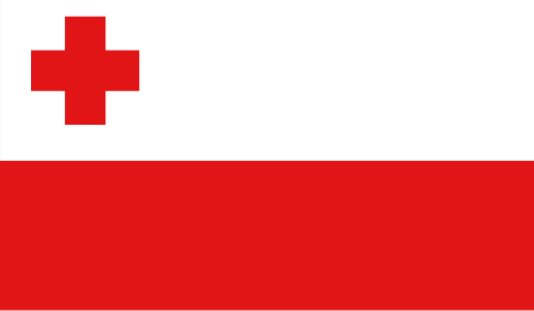
Tovata Confederacy flag of Fiji

Tovata is one of three confederacies comprising the Fijian House of Chiefs, to which all of Fiji's chiefs belong.

== Details of Tovata ==
It is located in the north east of the country, covering the provinces of Bua, Macuata and Cakaudrove on the northern island Vanua Levu, as well as the Lau Islands.

== Paramount Title of Tovata ==
The Tovata Confederacy, (like the Kubuna and Burebasaga confederacies) is a recent invention. It was conceived on 14 February 1867 by the Tui Lau, Ma’afu, as cited in the Na Mata as follows:

"A tauyavutaka na turaga ni Toga o Ma'afu ena nona via vakacokovatataka na vanua era vakarorogo vua, ena veirogorogoci kei ira na turaga ni vanua o Bua, Macuata, Cakaudrove kei Lau."

The key word here is "veirogorogoci" which denotes "listening to each other". In other words, this confederacy's membership are equal in rank which is why during traditional oratures and discourses, it is referred to as "Buinimasi e Va” or “Matanitu Veiwekani Qaqa na Tovata”. Seen another way, this is Fiji's equivalent of a United Nations of sorts, where each chief is of equal ranking with other chiefs in the Tovata jurisdiction.

Kubuna and Burebasaga confederacies, on the other hand have layers upon layers of chief, vassal warlord, chieftain and ranks within ranks, underscoring its long alliances and relationships in-built into it. Tovata is not like that. It is more even and democratic in structure. It was conceived by Ma’afu and headed by the British consul in Levuka as its prime minister.

There is no paramount chief in the Tovata Confederacy. However, during traditional functions where all four chiefs (Tui Bua, Tui Cakau, Tui Lau, and Tui Macuata) are present, the eldest chief (based on age) will traditionally drink the first cup of kava.

== Notable Fijians of Tovata ==
Although the smallest of the three confederacies, Tovata has been the most politically influential. Ratu Sir Lala Sukuna, considered the father of modern Fiji, was from Tovata, as were Ratu Sir Kamisese Mara, Fiji's longtime first prime minister and second president; Ratu Sir Penaia Ganilau, the first president of Fiji. In addition, Sitiveni Rabuka, incumbent prime minister, former Attorney General, Qoriniasi Bale and Laisenia Qarase. Other notable leaders are Tui Cakau Ratu Naiqama Lalabalavu and Ratu Epeli Ganilau, both of whom have been politically active.

Business persons also from Tovata include Roko Matai of the Yatu Lau and Mere Samisoni, founder of the bakery chain Hot Bread Kitchen and a former Member of Parliament.
