= Tui Lau =

Fijian chiefly title

Tui Lau is a Fijian chiefly title originally created in 1869 for Maʻafu, the son of a Tongan chief who lived in Lakeba. The title of Tui Lau was revived in 1938 and bestowed on Ratu Sukuna, a Fijian leader who was an important figure in the British colonial administration.

== History ==
Ma'afu was disclaimed as a Tongan Prince by his cousin King George Tupou I. Since the Vuanirewa Clan of the Lau Islands considered Ma'afu as their own, they therefore bestowed him the title as the first Tui Lau, with the endorsement of Tui Nayau.

The title was later revived in 1938 by the Vuanirewa Clan and bestowed to Ratu Sir Lala Sukuna upon the approval and support of the Tui Nayau, Ratu Tevita Uluiilakeba.

After the passing of Ratu Sir Lala Sukuna, Ratu Tevita Uluilakeba bestowed the title of Tui Lau on his eldest son, Ratu Sir Kamisese Mara.

The title remained vacant following Ratu Sir Kamisese’s death in 2004.

On 10 July 2025, his youngest son, Ratu Tevita Lutunauga Kapaiwai Uluilakeba Mara, was officially coronated at the Church and traditionally installed as Tui Lau with the support of the Vuanirewa Household. He is the first to be traditionally installed to the title.

This followed his official church coronation and traditional installation in Nayau as Tui Nayau and Sau ni Vanua ko Lau at Lakeba.

== Recent history ==
Endorsed by the Vuanirewa Household, Ratu Tevita Lutunauga Kapaiwai Uluilakeba Mara became the 4th Tui Lau and the first to be officially coronated at the Church and traditionally installed.

== List of Tui Lau ==
Name	Reigned	Lived
Enele Maʻafu	1869–1881	1816–1881
Ratu Sir Josefa Lalabalavu Vana'ali'ali Sukuna	1938–1958	1888–1958
Ratu Sir Kamisese Mara	1963–2004	1920–2004
Ratu Tevita Kapaiwai Uluilakeba Mara	2025–present	

== See also ==
- Enele Ma'afu
- Kamisese Mara
- Lala Sukuna
- Tui Nayau
