= Vanua Balavu =

Island in Fiji's Lau archipelago

- Map of Vanua Balavu

- Location within Fiji

Geography
- Location: South Pacific Ocean
- Coordinates: 17°14′S 178°57′W
- Archipelago: Northern Lau Islands
- Adjacent to: Koro Sea
- Total islands: 1
- Major islands: 1
- Area: 57 km^{2} (22 sq mi)
- Length: 21 km (13 mi)
- Highest elevation: 283 m (928 ft)

Administration
- Fiji
- Division: Eastern
- Province: Lau
- District: Lomaloma; Mualevu
- Largest settlement: Lomaloma (pop. 250)

Demographics
- Population: 1,200 (2014)
- Pop. density: 21.05/km^{2} (54.52/sq mi)
- Ethnic groups: Native Fijians, Indo-Fijians; other (Asian, Europeans, other Pacific Islander)

Vanua Balavu (pronounced [βaˈnua mbaˈlaβu]) is the third-largest island in Fiji's Lau archipelago, and the main island of the Northern Lau Group.

== Geography and infrastructure ==
This coral and volcanic island has a land area of 53 square kilometres (20 square miles). Its maximum elevation is 283 metres (928 feet). The island is characterized by steep undercut cliffs with fertile volcanic soil. It is well watered and has hot springs. There is an extensive reef system, including the islets of Qilaqila also known as the Bay of Islands. The traditional owners of Qilaqila are the iTaukei, the mataqalis' from Mavana Village. All visitors to Qilaqila must do sevusevu and have received permission from the village elders of Daliconi Village to visit.

The main village on the island is Lomaloma. Vanua Balavu has an airstrip, a post office in Lomaloma copra port, and a small hospital. There was also the Lomaloma Copra Biofuel Project which provided power to three villages, Naqara, Sawana and Lomaloma. However, it is now defunct.

== Points of interest ==
A large sea cave, named Qaranilaca, on the southeastern tip of Vanua Balavu was excavated in 2000 and shown to have been used by humans more than 10 centuries ago.

== Notable people ==
A notable person from Vanua Balavu is Laisenia Qarase, Fiji's Prime Minister from 2000 to 2006, who hails from the village of Mavana. Other prominent Vanua Balavu natives are the academic leader Esther Williams, from Levukana village, former Attorney-General Qoriniasi Bale, from Levukana village, and prominent former politician Filipe Bole, also from Mualevu village. Charles Walker, a former politician and Fiji diplomat hails from Sawana village with Lavinia Wainiqolo Padarath, a staunch trade unionist and former politician. Walker served as a Minister for Women and Social Welfare under the Fiji Labour Party election win in 1999.

Mere Samisoni, businesswoman and politician, comes from the village of Lomaloma, as does the former Lami Mayor Tevita Vuatalevu, who hails from the village of Mavana. Current Flying Fijians Josh Matavesi and Sam Matavesi who were born and raised in Cornwall, England are also natives of Vanua Balavu through their paternal line.

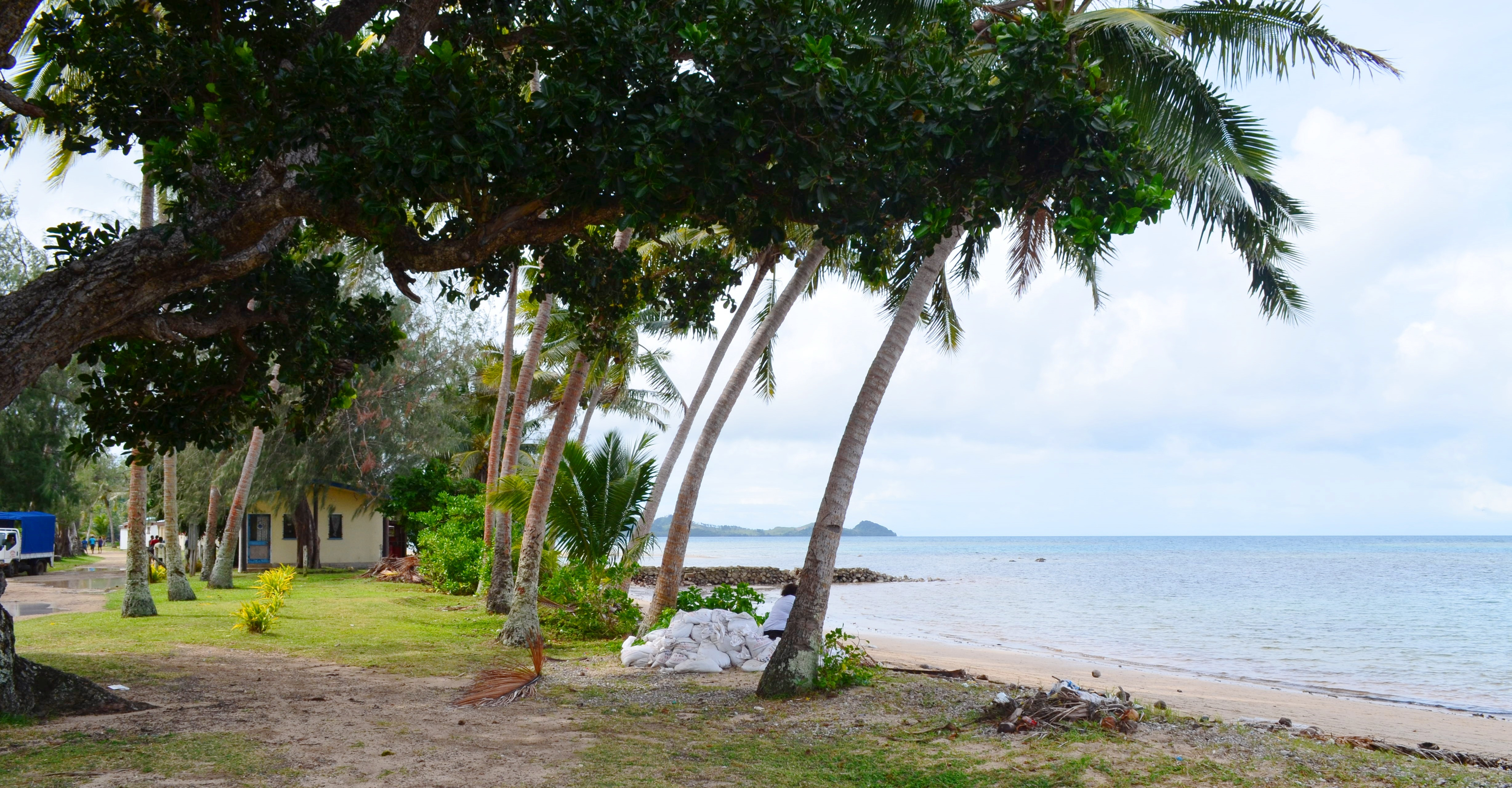
Beach on Vanua Balavu

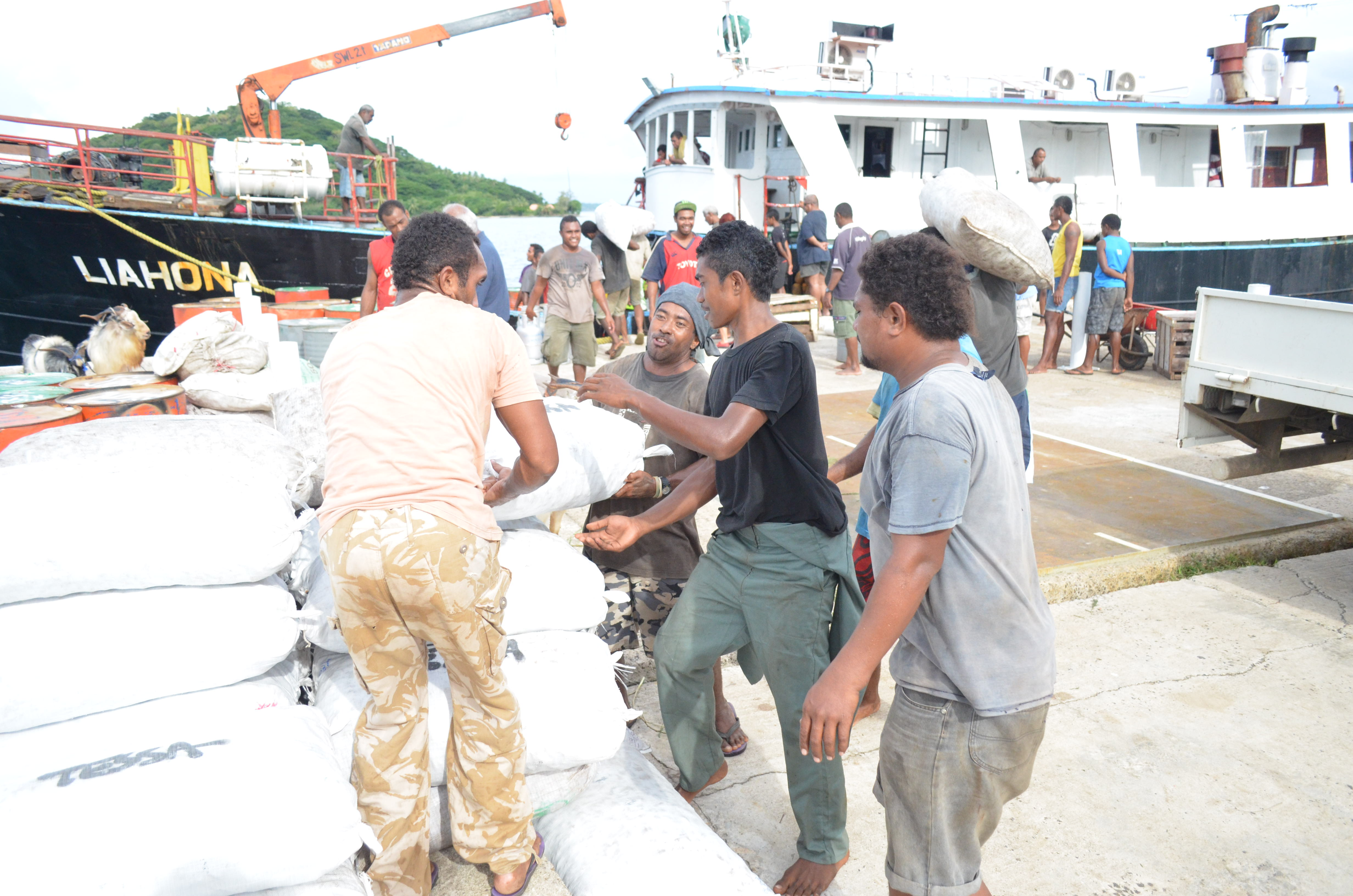
Men loading bags of copra and other crops onto an inter-island vessel at Lomaloma wharf, Vanua Balavu for markets in Suva the capital of Fiji.
