= Foreign relations of Fiji =

Fiji has experienced many coups recently, in 1987, 2000, and 2006. Fiji has been suspended various times from the Commonwealth of Nations, a grouping of mostly former British colonies. It was readmitted to the Commonwealth in December 2001, following the parliamentary election held to restore democracy in September that year, and has been suspended again because of the 2006 coup, but has been readmitted a second time after the 2014 election. Other Pacific Island governments have generally been sympathetic to Fiji's internal political problems and have declined to take public positions.

Fiji became the 127th member of the United Nations on 13 October 1970, and participates actively in the organization. Fiji's contributions to UN peacekeeping are unique for a nation of its size. A nation with a population of less than one million, it maintains nearly 1,000 soldiers overseas in UN peacekeeping missions, mainly in the Middle East.

Since Fiji's independence, the country has been a leader in the South Pacific region, and has played a leading role in the formation of the South Pacific Forum. Fiji has championed causes of common interest to Pacific Island countries.

Since 2005, Fiji has become embroiled in a number of disagreements with other countries, including Australia, China, New Zealand, South Korea, the United States, and Vanuatu.

The country's foreign relations and diplomatic missions are maintained by its Ministry of Foreign Affairs and International Cooperation.

== Diplomatic relations list ==
List of countries which Fiji maintains diplomatic relations with:

#	Country	Date
1	Australia	10 October 1970
2	Canada	10 October 1970
3	France	10 October 1970
4	India	10 October 1970
5	Israel	10 October 1970
6	Pakistan	10 October 1970
7	New Zealand	10 October 1970
8	United Kingdom	10 October 1970
9	Japan	15 October 1970
10	Luxembourg	January 1971
11	South Korea	31 January 1971
12	United States	22 July 1971
13	Singapore	30 November 1971
14	Malaysia	30 January 1972
15	Netherlands	February 1972
16	Egypt	5 May 1972
17	Bangladesh	8 September 1972
18	Belgium	September 1972
19	Sri Lanka	September 1972
20	Chile	10 October 1972
21	Italy	13 October 1972
22	Thailand	15 December 1972
23	Mali	10 April 1973
24	Germany	1 August 1973
25	Philippines	18 December 1973
26	Russia	30 January 1974
27	Indonesia	17 June 1974
28	Samoa	10 November 1974
29	North Korea	14 April 1975
30	Argentina	30 April 1975
31	Senegal	14 May 1975
32	Romania	15 August 1975
33	Bahamas	1 September 1975
34	Mexico	1 September 1975
35	Papua New Guinea	16 September 1975
36	China	5 November 1975
37	Turkey	17 November 1975
38	Mongolia	15 March 1976
39	Serbia	30 July 1976
40	Spain	10 December 1976
41	Norway	18 January 1977
42	Portugal	21 February 1977
43	Finland	1 December 1977
44	Greece	24 February 1978
45	Solomon Islands	28 July 1978
—	Holy See	12 September 1978
46	Tuvalu	1 October 1978
47	Sweden	3 April 1979
48	Kiribati	12 July 1979
49	Jamaica	11 December 1979
50	Vanuatu	30 July 1980
51	Nauru	1980
52	Tonga	1980
53	Belize	20 October 1981
54	Venezuela	8 April 1983
55	Nepal	12 June 1986
56	Seychelles	4 December 1986
57	Colombia	10 September 1987
58	Marshall Islands	22 January 1988
59	Maldives	15 March 1988
60	Federated States of Micronesia	27 May 1989
61	Switzerland	1989
62	Nigeria	1990
63	Austria	22 May 1992
64	Vietnam	14 May 1993
65	South Africa	7 November 1994
66	Slovakia	8 July 1996
67	Czech Republic	17 July 1996
68	Uruguay	17 September 1996
69	Slovenia	29 September 1996
70	Croatia	14 July 1997
71	Denmark	1 December 1997
—	Cook Islands	14 July 1998
72	Ireland	19 February 2002
73	Eswatini	14 March 2002
74	Cuba	19 July 2002
75	Timor-Leste	22 August 2002
76	Mauritius	2 September 2003
77	Kuwait	28 September 2005
78	Brazil	16 February 2006
79	Dominican Republic	27 September 2007
80	Iceland	8 February 2008
81	Latvia	7 March 2008
82	Estonia	14 July 2008
83	North Macedonia	15 March 2010
84	United Arab Emirates	17 March 2010
85	Azerbaijan	18 March 2010
86	Georgia	29 March 2010
87	Eritrea	12 April 2010
88	Bosnia and Herzegovina	20 April 2010
89	Myanmar	10 May 2010
90	Belarus	26 May 2010
91	Cambodia	27 May 2010
92	Algeria	2 June 2010
93	Afghanistan	4 June 2010
94	Armenia	7 June 2010
95	Montenegro	15 June 2010
96	Morocco	15 June 2010
97	Uzbekistan	16 June 2010
98	Sudan	19 June 2010
99	Albania	23 June 2010
100	Oman	12 July 2010
101	Tajikistan	20 July 2010
102	Laos	27 August 2010
103	Djibouti	16 September 2010
104	Kenya	21 September 2010
105	Bahrain	25 September 2010
106	Qatar	20 October 2010
107	Lebanon	29 October 2010
108	Moldova	7 December 2010
109	Paraguay	22 December 2010
110	Syria	23 December 2010
111	Ethiopia	6 January 2011
112	Guinea	28 January 2011
113	Hungary	7 March 2011
114	Brunei	25 April 2011
115	Republic of the Congo	11 May 2011
116	Angola	18 May 2011
117	Togo	31 May 2011
118	Malawi	25 June 2011
119	Botswana	28 June 2011
120	Benin	16 September 2011
121	Equatorial Guinea	6 October 2011
122	Jordan	15 November 2011
123	Bhutan	18 November 2011
124	Mauritania	19 November 2011
125	Suriname	21 November 2011
126	Cape Verde	2 April 2012
127	Kazakhstan	6 June 2012
128	Peru	11 June 2012
129	Iran	30 August 2012
130	Nicaragua	21 September 2012
131	South Sudan	25 September 2012
132	Ghana	12 October 2012
133	Haiti	16 October 2012
134	Panama	9 November 2012
135	Liberia	15 November 2012
136	Mozambique	6 December 2012
137	Central African Republic	22 January 2013
138	Ecuador	12 February 2013
—	Kosovo	13 February 2013
139	Cyprus	15 March 2013
140	San Marino	15 March 2013
141	Saint Vincent and the Grenadines	15 April 2013
142	Costa Rica	2 August 2013
143	Guatemala	13 September 2013
144	Uganda	16 September 2013
145	Ukraine	23 September 2013
146	Andorra	27 September 2013
147	Comoros	7 November 2013
148	Monaco	13 November 2013
149	Burkina Faso	22 November 2013
150	Bolivia	9 January 2014
151	Lithuania	24 January 2014
152	Kyrgyzstan	14 February 2014
153	Dominica	21 March 2014
154	Ivory Coast	4 April 2014
155	Somalia	10 April 2014
156	Turkmenistan	2 May 2014
157	Saint Kitts and Nevis	16 May 2014
158	Yemen	6 June 2014
159	Liechtenstein	30 June 2014
160	Guinea-Bissau	7 July 2014
161	Poland	11 July 2014
162	Iraq	12 August 2014
163	Niger	9 September 2014
164	Gambia	24 October 2014
165	Guyana	8 December 2014
166	Malta	11 December 2014
167	Sierra Leone	6 February 2015
168	Antigua and Barbuda	20 February 2015
169	El Salvador	2 March 2015
170	Burundi	20 March 2015
171	Bulgaria	24 March 2015
172	Palau	2 April 2015
173	Grenada	23 June 2015
174	Chad	4 August 2015
175	Saudi Arabia	4 August 2015
176	Honduras	26 September 2015
177	Saint Lucia	27 January 2016
178	Trinidad and Tobago	18 March 2016
179	Tanzania	26 May 2016
180	Barbados	19 June 2017
—	Niue	7 November 2023

== Bilateral relations ==
Country	Formal Relations Began	-
Australia	10 October 1970	See Australia–Fiji relations On 13 April 2005, Fiji's prime minister, Laisenia Qarase, rejected criticism from Australia and some other countries over the prosecution and imprisonment of two foreigners charged with committing homosexual acts, which were illegal in Fiji at the time, and said that other countries needed to respect Fiji's independence. Qarase said that as member of the United Nations, Fiji was as entitled as any other country to make its own laws as it saw fit. The Australian Government took a more measured position than its New Zealand counterpart over the controversial Reconciliation, Tolerance, and Unity Bill being debated in the Fijian Parliament. Susan Boyd, a former Australian High Commissioner to Fiji, strongly criticized the legislation, but Foreign Minister Alexander Downer said that it is an "internal matter" and that Australia does not want to get involved. He did, however, condemn recent threats from the military commander, Commodore Frank Bainimarama, to declare martial law and arrest members of the present government if the bill is passed. The Australian High Commission in Suva told Bainimarama that his threats are not "the proper role for the military in a democracy." Australian Foreign Minister Alexander Downer visited Fiji for two days of talks, from 28 to 30 September 2005. Downer met government ministers and officials, Opposition Leader Mahendra Chaudhry, and military commander Commodore Frank Bainimarama. The talks covered the controversial Unity Bill, as well as the future of Fiji's preferential trade access to the Australian market, which the Fijian Government regards as a priority. Downer said that he intended to elaborate further on Australian Prime Minister John Howard's promise of a seven-year extension of the SPARTECA–TCF scheme, which assists Fiji's textile, clothing, and footwear industry. Foreign Minister Tavola expressed grave concern on 7 February 2006, about a proposed regional trade agreement (RTA) between Australia and China, saying that Fiji's exports to Australia would be unable to compete with Chinese products. For that reason, Fiji was persisting in its efforts to persuade Australia to renew the South Pacific Regional Trade and Economic Cooperation – Textile Clothing Footwear (SPARTECA–TCF) scheme, to improve the competitiveness of Fijian exports, the Fiji Live news service reported. The Fiji Times reported on 14 September 2006, that Prime Ministers Qarase and Howard had discussed possible Australian assistance for the reform of Fiji's sugar industry, with Howard reported receptive to giving aid. Qarase said that he had asked Australia to provide two or three experts to help with the establishment of the proposed Fiji Research Sugar Institute. Regarding the coup, Australia's foreign minister at the time, Alexander Downer, said that the military were "slowly trying to take control" and pressured the PM to resign. It was reported that in 2006 Fiji's Prime Minister Qarase asked Australia's Prime Minister John Howard for military assistance should a coup take place, but Howard declined. 2009 events; coup and diplomatic rift On 3 November 2009 Fiji ordered the diplomatic envoys of Australia to leave Fiji within 24 hours. The expulsion of the diplomats followed accusations by leader of Fiji, Frank Bainimarama, that Australia and New Zealand were interfering in Fiji's internal affairs and "wage a negative campaign against the government and people of Fiji". In particular Bainimarama says that the two countries were exerting pressure on Sri Lankan judges, brought in by Bainimarama to replace the uncooperative local judiciary, not to travel to the country and refusing to grant them transit visas. The Australian government denied this and stated that it only advised the judges that once they took up office in Fiji they would be subject to an existing travel ban in place against Fijian officials. Australia's senior diplomat in Fiji was also expelled in the 2006 coup. Fiji announced its withdrawal of their high commissioner from Australia. Australia and New Zealand responded on 4 November 2009, expelling Fiji's diplomats from both those countries. Stephen Smith, Australian Foreign Minister, rejected any accusations of meddling in Fiji's affairs and said that he was "deeply disappointed" by Fiji's actions. The then Prime Minister Kevin Rudd said that he would maintain his tough stance against Fiji in order to prevent a "coup culture" spreading around the Pacific.: Australia has a High Commission in Suva.; Fiji has a High Commission in Canberra and a consulate-general in Sydney.
Brazil	16 February 2006	Fiji Live reported on 23 February 2006 that Fiji's United Nations ambassador Isikia Savua and his Brazilian counterpart Ronaldo Mota Sardenberg had recently signed a communiqué to establish diplomatic relations. Savua expressed the hope that Fiji's bio-fuels industry could benefit from Brazilian technology.: Brazil is accredited to Fiji from its embassy in Canberra, Australia.; Fiji does not have an accreditation to Brazil.
Chile	10 October 1972	Chile is accredited to Fiji from its embassy in Wellington, New Zealand and maintains an honorary consulate in Suva.; Fiji is accredited to Chile from its embassy in Brasilia, Brazil.
China	5 November 1975	See China–Fiji relations A diplomatic row with China erupted on 5 May 2005, when President Chen Shui-bian of Taiwan arrived for a private visit and was welcomed at a private function at Suva's Sheraton Resort by Vice-President Ratu Joni Madraiwiwi, Ratu Ovini Bokini (Chairman of the Great Council of Chiefs), Senate President Taito Waqavakatoga and several other Senators and MPs, and several judges including Chief Justice Daniel Fatiaki. Foreign Minister Kaliopate Tavola asserted that those who attended the welcoming ceremony did so "of their own accord," not as government representatives, and that Prime Minister Qarase's presence in the same hotel where President Chen was staying was purely "coincidental." Chinese ambassador Cai Jin Biao rejected this explanation, and said that the visit was a violation of the One China Policy, to which Fiji had agreed when diplomatic relations were established in 1975, which would "sabotage relations between China and Fiji." He charged that Prime Minister Qarase and Foreign Minister Tavola had known of the upcoming visit for months. The embassy issued a further statement on 7 May, demanding that Fiji discontinue any effort to establish a dialogue with Taiwan. The row escalated when, on 16 May, Health Minister Solomone Naivalu voted in support of Taiwan's bid to gain observer status at the World Health Assembly in Geneva. Naivalu had apparently done so on his own initiative, contrary to a government briefing, sparking a major public disagreement between himself and Foreign Minister Tavola. Jia Qinglin, chairman of the People's Political Consultative Conference (CPPCC), was dispatched to Fiji and met Prime Minister Qarase during a brief stopover on 21–22 May, a move that Tavola said was not coincidental. He said that Fiji could not afford to lose China, and that the government would ensure that "careless incidences" like Naivalu's vote in Geneva would not recur. Naivalu responded by saying that his vote was nothing new: "We always support Taiwan to get observer status every year," he said. On 10 December 2005, The New Zealand Herald quoted Tavola as saying that Fiji would have to find a way to resolve a stand-off between the PRC and Taiwan, over membership of the Suva-based Council of South Pacific Tourism Organisation; China was resisting Taiwanese attempts to join the organization on an equal basis. "If China had its way it would not want Taiwan on that. So we have to resolve the situation amicably and are looking at how both countries can be represented there," Tavola said. In defence of the earlier incident over the Taiwanese President's visit, Tavola said that it was the Pacific way to welcome people. "Even when considering Taiwan as a province of China, he went on, the President of a province is a man of high profile, so when he comes there is an urge to extend hospitality." It did not signify any modification to Fiji's adherence to the One China policy, he had explained to the Chinese ambassador. China has invested in a number of major projects in Fiji. These include the Suva sports stadium, built for the South Pacific Games of 2003. On 14 December 2005, Fiji's military commander, Commodore Frank Bainimarama began an official visit to China, at the invitation of the People's Liberation Army. He reaffirmed Fiji's support for the One China policy. It was announced on 24 January 2006 that Chinese Premier Wen Jiabao would visit Fiji that April to open the China-Pacific Islands Countries Economic Development & Cooperation Forum Ministerial Conference 2006 at Sofitel Fiji Resort in Nadi, a conference of economic and trade ministers from Pacific Island countries. Six prime ministers from neighbouring countries are expected to participate, according to a Fiji Times report on 23 February. His visit to Fiji will be the first by a senior Chinese Government official. In an interview with PACNEWS on 1 February 2006, Jeremaia Waqanisau, Fiji's ambassador to Beijing, made a stinging attack on the efficiency of the Fijian civil service, saying that it negatively affected Fiji's ability to present itself to China. Cabinet ministers visited China without the Fijian embassy being informed, he complained. Certain civil servants were extremely passive in their dealings with China, he said. Another factor inhibiting Chinese investment was the instability caused by friction between the government and the military, he surmised, and the Fijian embassy in Beijing was continually engaged in damage control.
Cuba	1 September 1972	Fiji's ambassador to the United Nations, Berenado Vunibobo, stated in 2008 that his country could seek closer relations with Cuba, and in particular medical assistance, following a decline in Fiji's relations with New Zealand. Fiji's foreign minister Ratu Epeli Nailatikau took part in the first Cuba-Pacific Islands ministerial meeting in Havana in September 2008.: Fiji is accredited to Cuba from its High Commission in New Delhi, India.; Cuba has an embassy in Suva.
Cyprus		Cyprus is represented in Fiji by its High Commission in Canberra, Australia.; Both countries are full members of the Commonwealth of Nations as republics.
Denmark		Fiji is represented in Denmark, through its embassy in London, United Kingdom, with a consulate in Copenhagen. Denmark is represented in Fiji, through its embassy in Jakarta, Indonesia. Denmark has one consulate in Suva, Fiji.
France	10 October 1970	See Fiji–France relations Relations between France and Fiji are currently strained, due to France's condemnation of the 2006 Fijian coup d'état. Previously, Franco-Fiji bilateral relations had primarily been centred on military cooperation, with France assisting Fiji in surveiling its maritime zone, and on development aid. French military assistance was suspended after the coup. French aid to Fiji includes the providing of equipment for poor and isolated areas, and assistance in the development of renewable energy. France also provides Fiji with translations into English of French scientific documents pertaining to the Pacific area. France promotes French culture and the French language in Fiji through the presence of the Alliance Française and by encouraging the teaching of French in schools and at the University of the South Pacific.: Fiji is accredited to France from its embassy in Brussels, Belgium.; France has an embassy in Suva.
Georgia		Both countries established diplomatic relations on 29 March 2010.; Fiji is represented in Georgia by its embassy in Brussels, Belgium.; Georgia is represented in Fiji by its embassy in Canberra, Australia.
Greece	1978	Diplomatic relations were established in 1978.; Fiji is represented in Greece through its embassy in Brussels, Belgium.; Greece is represented in Fiji through its embassy in Wellington, New Zealand and an honorary consulate in Suva.
India		See Fiji–India relations Fiji's relationship with India is often seen by observers against the backdrop of the sometimes tense relations between its indigenous people and the 38 percent of the population who are of Indian descent. A major diplomatic event for Fiji in 2005 occurred from 8 to 15 October, when Prime Minister Laisenia Qarase and Foreign Minister Kaliopate Tavola made an official visit to India.: India has a High Commission in Suva.; Fiji maintains a High Commission in New Delhi.
Israel	August 1970	See Fiji–Israel relations Relations with Israel have generally been cordial, with Fiji usually taking positions sympathetic to Israel in United Nations resolutions. Relations were strained in July 2006, however, when three Israelis, who arrived in Fiji on the 13th, were arrested and deported. Amit Ronen, Eldar Avracohen, and Nimrod Lahav were detained in a jail cell at Nadi Airport for six hours and deported to Australia the next day, for their alleged mistreatment of Palestinians.: Israel has an embassy in Suva.; Fiji has an embassy in Jerusalem.
Japan	See Fiji-Japan relations	Fiji has an embassy in Tokyo.; Japan has an embassy in Suva.
Kosovo	13 February 2013	Fiji recognised the Republic of Kosovo on 19 November 2012 and established official diplomatic relations on 13 February 2013.
Malaysia	1977	See Fiji–Malaysia relations Both countries were part of the British Empire and have a long-standing relationship because many Fijian soldiers served in Peninsular Malaysia during the Malayan Emergency from 1952 to 1956.
Mexico	31 August 1975	See Fiji–Mexico relations: Fiji is accredited to Mexico from its embassy in Washington, D.C., United States.; Mexico is accredited to Fiji from its embassy in Canberra, Australia and maintains an honorary consulate in Suva.
New Zealand	10 October 1970	See Fiji–New Zealand relations On 10 June 2005, Foreign Minister Tavola signed a "Memorandum of Understanding" with his New Zealand counterpart, Phil Goff, aimed at fostering cooperation in the fight against terrorism. Meanwhile, New Zealand's Prime Minister Helen Clark announced that New Zealand would double its annual aid to Fiji, from NZ$4 million to NZ$8 million. Much of this aid, the Fijian Government revealed, would be used for poverty alleviation and squatter resettlement. New Zealand's Foreign Minister Winston Peters (who replaced Goff in late 2005) flew into Fiji on 8 February 2006, for three days of talks with Fijian Government officials. He met Prime Minister Qarase, Finance Minister Ratu Jone Kubuabola, and military commander Commodore Frank Bainimarama on the first day of his visit; meetings with Foreign Minister Tavola and House of Representatives Speaker Ratu Epeli Nailatikau were held later. The meeting with Bainimarama attracted some media attention; Bainimarama said that the meeting had been approved by Prime Minister Qarase and that there was nothing underhanded about it. The talks are to cover such matters as the Pacific Plan and a cost-sharing agreement for a citizen education project, promoted by the United Nations Development Programme. The New Zealand Minister of Foreign Affairs Winston Peters described the 2006 coup as a "creeping siege on democratic institutions". Helen Clark said that the Fijian constitution only allowed the president to request the dissolving of parliament if the prime minister no longer had the confidence of the parliament and that this was clearly not the case. The New Zealand Government has also stated those taking part in the coup will be banned from entry to New Zealand, and that military ties, aid and sporting contacts will be cut. Helen Clark has said in the NZ Herald that she would consider sanctions against Fiji. On 3 November 2009, Fiji ordered the diplomatic envoys of New Zealand to leave Fiji within 24 hours. The expulsion of the diplomats followed accusations by leader of Fiji, Frank Bainimarama, that Australia and New Zealand were interfering in Fiji's internal affairs and attempting to "wage a negative campaign against the government and people of Fiji". In particular Bainimarama says that the two countries were exerting pressure on Sri Lankan judges, brought in by Bainimarama to replace the uncooperative local judiciary, not to travel to the country and refusing to grant them transit visas. New Zealand's top diplomat in Fiji at the time was Todd Cleaver. New Zealand returned the favour on 4 November when it expelled Fiji's acting head of mission, Kuliniasi Seru Savou, from the country. New Zealand's Foreign Minister Murray McCully said that "Diplomatic relations with Fiji are roughly the same they have been for the last couple of years unfortunately" and that "we have had our ups and downs and unfortunately today they are down". The event marked the third time that New Zealand's top diplomat in Fiji has been expelled since the 2006 coup.: Fiji has a High Commission in Wellington.; New Zealand has a High Commission in Suva.
Papua New Guinea	1975	Relations between Fiji and Papua New Guinea became strained in November 2005, in the wake of revelations that a number of Fijian citizens, possibly mercenaries, had entered Papua New Guinea illegally and were involved in arming and training a separatist militia on the island of Bougainville. On a separate matter, PNG Trade and Industry Minister Paul Tiensten was quoted in Fiji Village on 21 February 2006 as saying that sanctions against Fiji were being considered, following a Fijian refusal of a PNG kava shipment and an earlier rejection of corned beef shipped from PNG.: See also Fijian mercenaries in Bougainville
Romania	1975	Both countries established diplomatic relations on 15 August 1975.; Romania is represented in Fiji by its embassy in Canberra, Australia.
Russia	30 January 1974	See Fiji–Russia relations: Fiji is accredited to Russia from its embassy in Tokyo, Japan.; Russia is accredited to Fiji from its embassy in Canberra, Australia.
Samoa	10 November 1974	Fiji is accredited to Samoa from its Ministry of Foreign Affairs based in Suva.; Samoa has a High Commission in Suva, which was established early in 2021.
Solomon Islands		See Fiji–Solomon Islands relations Diplomatic relations are currently cordial, although the Solomon Islands government has aligned itself with other countries in the region to urge Fiji interim Prime Minister Voreqe Bainimarama to restore democracy in Fiji. Fiji and the Solomon Islands are both located in Melanesia, and are both members of the Melanesian Spearhead Group. They also participate in other regional organisations including the Pacific Islands Forum. In August 2008, it was announced that the Solomon Islands intended to open a High Commission in Suva, and in December the government of Fiji announced that it had "formally endorsed the establishment of a Resident Diplomatic Mission in Suva by the Government of the Solomon Islands". Fiji's High Commission to Papua New Guinea is accredited to the Solomon Islands. In July 2014, a row between the two nations erupted over air services which resulted in both nations airlines being prevented to fly over the other. But both nations reached an agreement in early January 2015 to lift the suspension of their Air Services Agreement, allowing Fiji Airways and Solomon Airlines to fly between the two countries. Fiji's Civil Aviation Minister Aiyaz Sayed-Khaiyum said both airlines are entitled to operate three flights per week. Fiji Airways Chief executive Stefan Pichler has indicated they will begin the flights in March however Solomon Airlines has yet to confirm when they will begin their flights.
South Korea	1970	See Fiji–South Korea relations The Republic of the Fiji Islands and the Republic of Korea established official diplomatic relations in 1970, when Fiji became independent. There is a South Korean embassy in Suva and a Fijian embassy in Seoul. Relations between the two countries are currently friendly, and are being strengthened at the initiative of the Fijian authorities.
Tonga		See Fiji–Tonga relations It was reported on 2 November 2005 that a territorial dispute was looming between Fiji and Tonga over a reef lying to the south of both countries. The people of Ono-i-Lau in the Lau Islands archipelago claim that Minerva Reef is part of their traditional fishing ground. Attorney General Qoriniasi Bale told the Lau Provincial Council that the government had a team of experts preparing a case to be taken to the United Nations International Seabed Authority, which is based in Jamaica. The reef has also been claimed by Tonga since 1972, and Tonga's Surveyor General, Tevita Malolo, told Radio New Zealand that Fiji had never contested Tonga's claim until now.
Turkey	Dec. 17, 1975	Turkish ambassador in Wellington to New Zealand is also accredited to Fiji.
Tuvalu		See Fiji–Tuvalu relations: Fiji has non-resident ambassador resident in Suva accredited to Tuvalu.; Tuvalu has a High Commission in Suva.
United Kingdom	10 October 1970	See Fiji–United Kingdom relations Foreign Secretary David Cameron with Fijian Prime Minister Sitiveni Rabuka in London, May 2024. Fiji established diplomatic relations with the United Kingdom on 10 October 1970.: Fiji maintains a high commission in London.; The United Kingdom is accredited to Fiji through its high commission in Suva.; The UK governed Fiji from 1874 until 1970, when Fiji achieved full independence. Both countries share common membership of the Commonwealth, the International Criminal Court, and the World Trade Organization, as well as the Pacific States–United Kingdom Economic Partnership Agreement. Bilaterally the two countries have a Double Taxation Convention.
United States	22 July 1971	See Fiji–United States relations Before the 2006 coup, the US government was highly critical of Fiji, causing tensions between the two countries. Relations are currently poor, due to the United States' opposition to Fiji's unelected government which took power after the coup d'état in December 2006 and did not allow elections until September 2014.: Fiji has an embassy in Washington, D.C.; United States has an embassy in Suva.

== Fijian missions abroad ==
Fiji maintains direct diplomatic or consular relations with countries with historical, cultural, or trading ties to Fiji; Ambassadors stationed in such countries are often accredited to neighbouring countries. Fiji maintains embassies in Belgium (taking care of Fiji's relations with the entire European Union), China, Japan, South Korea, and the United States; and High Commissions in Australia, India, Malaysia, Papua New Guinea, the United Kingdom and New Zealand (in keeping with the Commonwealth practice of calling missions in fellow-commonwealth countries High Commissions rather than Embassies). Fiji also has a Permanent Mission to the United Nations.

== Foreign reaction to Fijian legislation ==
Australia and New Zealand have both expressed concern over legislation currently before the Fijian Parliament (as of June 2005), which proposes to establish a Reconciliation and Unity Commission, with the power (subject to presidential approval) to compensate victims and pardon persons convicted of crimes related to the coup d'état which deposed the elected government in 2000.

On 30 August 2005, the then Commonwealth Secretary-General Don McKinnon called on the Fijian government to ensure that the legislation reflected the views of its citizens. He emphasized, however, that the Commonwealth did not have a position on the bill.

== See also ==
- List of diplomatic missions in Fiji
- List of diplomatic missions of Fiji
