= Israelis =

People of Israel

ישראלים إسرائيليون
- Flag of Israel

- Map of the Israeli diaspora

Regions with significant populations
- Israel: c. 9.8 million (including occupied territories)
- United States: 106,839 – 500,000
- Russia: 100,000 (80,000 in Moscow)
- India: 40–70,000
- United Kingdom: 11,892 – 50,000
- Canada: 21,320
- Australia: 15,000
- Netherlands: 10,371
- Germany: 10,000

Languages
- Hebrew (official); Arabic (recognized); English, Russian, French, Amharic, Tigrinya, various others (see languages of Israel)

Religion
- Majority: Judaism; Minority: Islam, Christianity, Druzism, Samaritanism, Baháʼí Faith

Israelis (Hebrew: יִשְׂרְאֵלִים, romanized: Yīśreʾēlīm; Arabic: إسرائيليون, romanized: Isrāʾīliyyūn) are the citizens, nationals, and permanent residents of the State of Israel, a multiethnic state. The largest ethnic group is Jews who account for 75% of the population, the second largest ethnic group is Arabs who represent 20% of the population, and the remaining 5% of the population are other ethnic and religious minorities such as Samaritans. Among Jews, 80% were born in Israel (sabras) and the rest are Jewish immigrants. Over 50% of the Jewish population is of at least partial Mizrahi descent.

Early Israeli culture was largely defined by communities of the Jewish diaspora who had made aliyah to British Mandatory Palestine from Europe, Western Asia, and North Africa in the late-19th and early-20th centuries. Later Jewish immigration from Ethiopia, the post-Soviet states, and the Americas introduced new cultural elements to Israeli society and have had a profound impact on modern Israeli culture.

Since Israel's independence in 1948, Israelis and people of Israeli descent have had a considerable diaspora, which largely overlaps with the Jewish diaspora but also with that of other ethnic and religious groups. A 2006 study found that almost 10% of the general Israeli population lives abroad, particularly in Russia (with Moscow housing the single largest Israeli community outside of Israel), India, Canada, the United Kingdom, the United States, and throughout Europe.

== Population ==
As of 2025, Israel's population is 10.148 million, of which the Israeli government estimates 7.76 million as Jews, 2.13 million as Arabs. Israel's official census includes Israeli settlers in the occupied territories (referred to as "disputed" by Israel). 280,000 Israeli settlers live in settlements in the Israeli-occupied West Bank, 190,000 in East Jerusalem, and 20,000 in the Golan Heights.

Of Jewish immigrants, 20.5% were from Europe and the Americas, and 9.2% were from Asia, Africa, and Middle Eastern countries. Less than half of all Israeli Jews are descended from immigrants from the European Jewish diaspora. Approximately the same number are descended from immigrants from Arab countries, Iran, Turkey and Central Asia. Over 200,000 are of Ethiopian and Indian-Jewish descent.

The official Israel Central Bureau of Statistics estimate of the Israeli Jewish population does not include those Israeli citizens, mostly descended from immigrants from the Soviet Union, who are registered as "others", or their immediate family members. Defined as non-Jews and non-Arabs, they make up about 3.5% of Israelis (350,000), and were eligible for Israeli citizenship under the Law of Return.

Israel's official language is Hebrew, which serves as the language of government and is spoken by the majority of the population. Arabic is spoken by the Arab minority and by some members of the Mizrahi Jewish community. English is studied in school and is spoken by the majority of the population as a second language. Other languages spoken in Israel include Russian, Yiddish, Spanish, Ladino, Amharic, Armenian, Romanian, and French.

Between 600,000 and 800,000 Israelis have emigrated or live abroad, a phenomenon known in Hebrew as yerida ("descent", in contrast to aliyah, which means "ascent"). Emigrants have various reasons for leaving or living abroad, but there is generally a combination of economic and political concerns.

== Ethnic and religious groups ==
The main Israeli ethnic and religious groups are as follows:

=== Jews ===
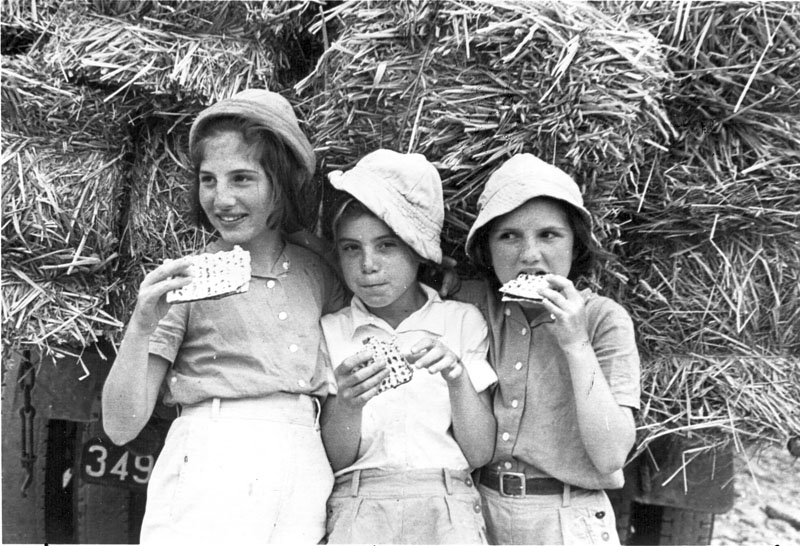
Israeli girls in the 1960s, eating matzot—unleavened bread traditionally eaten by Jews during Passover

Among the Israeli-born Jewish population, most are descended from Ashkenazi Jews, Mizrahi Jews, Sephardic Jews, Ethiopian Jews, and other Jewish ethnic divisions. Due to the historically large Mizrahi population and decades of ethnic intermixing, over 50% of Israel's current Jewish population is of at least partial Mizrahi descent.

The CBS traces the paternal country of origin of Israeli Jews as of 2010 is as follows.

Country of origin	Born abroad	Israeli born	Total	%
Total	1,610,900	4,124,400	5,753,300	100.0%
Asia	201,000	494,200	695,200	12.0%
Turkey	25,700	52,500	78,100	1.4%
Iraq	62,600	173,300	235,800	4.1%
Yemen	28,400	111,100	139,500	2.4%
Iran/Afghanistan	49,300	92,300	141,600	2.5%
India/Pakistan	17,600	29,000	46,600	0.8%
Syria/Lebanon	10,700	25,000	35,700	0.6%
Other	6,700	11,300	18,000	0.3%
Africa	315,800	572,100	887,900	15.4%
Morocco	153,600	339,600	493,200	8.6%
Algeria/Tunisia	43,200	91,700	134,900	2.3%
Libya	15,800	53,500	69,400	1.2%
Egypt	18,500	39,000	57,500	1.0%
Ethiopia	81,600	38,600	110,100	1.9%
Other	13,100	9,700	22,800	0.4%
Europe/Americas/Oceania	1,094,100	829,700	1,923,800	33.4%
Soviet Union	651,400	241,000	892,400	15.5%
Poland	51,300	151,000	202,300	3.5%
Romania	88,600	125,900	214,400	3.7%
Bulgaria/Greece	16,400	32,600	49,000	0.9%
Germany/Austria	24,500	50,600	75,200	1.3%
Czech Republic/Slovakia/Hungary	20,000	45,000	64,900	1.1%
France	41,100	26,900	68,000	1.2%
United Kingdom	21,000	19,900	40,800	0.7%
Europe, other	27,000	29,900	56,900	1.0%
North America/Oceania	90,500	63,900	154,400	2.7%
Argentina	35,500	26,100	61,600	1.1%
Latin America, other	26,900	17,000	43,900	0.8%
Israel	—	2,246,300	2,246,300	39.0%

=== Arabic-speaking minorities ===
==== Arab Palestinians ====
A large part of Mandate-period Arab Palestinians remained within Israel's borders following the 1948 exodus and are the largest group of Arabic-speaking and culturally Arab citizens of Israel. The vast majority of the Arab citizens of Israel are Sunni Muslim, while 9% of them are Christian, and 7.1% of them are Druze.

As of 2013, the Arab population of Israel amounts to 1,658,000, about 20.7% of the population. This figure include 209,000 Arabs (14% of the Israeli Arab population) in East Jerusalem, also counted in the Palestinian statistics, although 98 percent of East Jerusalem Palestinians have either Israeli residency or Israeli citizenship.

According to the Israeli Central Bureau of Statistics census in 2010, the Arab population in Israel lives in 134 Arabic towns and villages; around 44% of them live in towns, while 48% of them in villages with the status of Local council, and around 4% live in small villages that are part of Regional council. The Arab population in Israel is located in five main areas: Galilee (54.6% of total Israeli Arabs), Triangle (23.5% of total Israeli Arabs), Golan Heights, East Jerusalem, and Northern Negev (13.5% of total Israeli Arabs). Around 8.4% of Israeli Arabs live in officially mixed Jewish-Arab cities (excluding Arab residents in East Jerusalem), in Haifa, Lod, Ramle, Jaffa-Tel Aviv, Acre, Nof HaGalil, and Ma'alot Tarshiha.

==== Negev Bedouin ====
The Arab citizens of Israel also include the Bedouin. Israeli Bedouin include those who live in the north of the country, for the most part in villages and towns, and the Bedouin in the Negev, who are semi-nomadic or live in towns or unrecognized Bedouin villages. In 1999, 110,000 Bedouin lived in the Negev, 50,000 in the Galilee and 10,000 in the central region of Israel. As of 2013, the Negev Bedouin number 200,000–210,000.

==== Druze ====
There is also a significant population of Israeli Druze, estimated at 143,000 at the end of 2019. All Druze in British Mandate Palestine became Israeli citizens upon the foundation of the State of Israel.

==== Maronites ====
There are about 7,000 Maronite Christian Israelis, living mostly in the Galilee but also in Haifa, Nazareth, and Jerusalem. They are mostly pro-Israeli Lebanese former militia members and their families who fled Lebanon after the 2000 withdrawal of IDF from South Lebanon. Some, however, are from local Galilean communities such as Jish.

==== Copts ====
There are about 1,000 Coptic Israeli citizens.

==== Arameans ====
In September 2014, Israel recognized the "Aramean" ethnic identity of hundreds of the Christian citizens of Israel. This recognition comes after about seven years of activity by the Aramean Christian Foundation in Israel – Aram, led by IDF Major Shadi Khalloul Risho and the Israeli Christian Recruitment Forum, headed by Father Gabriel Naddaf of the Greek-Orthodox Church and Major Ihab Shlayan. The Aramean ethnic identity encompasses all the Christian Eastern Syriac churches in Israel, including the Maronite Church, Greek Orthodox Church, Greek Catholic Church, Syriac Catholic Church and Syriac Orthodox Church. Many Israelis who advocated for and identify as Aramean today are Maronites, with Assyrians identifying as well.

==== Assyrians ====
There are around 1,000 Assyrians living in Israel, mostly in Jerusalem and Nazareth. Assyrians are an Aramaic-speaking, Eastern Rite Christian minority who are descended from the ancient Mesopotamians. The old Syriac Orthodox monastery of Saint Mark lies in Jerusalem. Other than followers of the Syriac Orthodox Church, there are also followers of the Assyrian Church of the East and the Chaldean Catholic Church living in Israel.

=== Other citizens ===
==== African Hebrew Israelites ====
The African Hebrew Israelite Nation of Jerusalem is a small religious community whose members believe they are descended from the Ten Lost Tribes of Israel. Most of the over 5,000 members live in Dimona, Israel although there are additional, smaller, groups in Arad, Mitzpe Ramon, and the Tiberias area. At least some of them consider themselves to be Jewish, but Israeli authorities do not accept them as such, nor are their religious practices consistent with "mainstream Jewish tradition." The group, which consists of African Americans and their descendants, originated in Chicago in the early 1960s, moved to Liberia for a few years, and then immigrated to Israel.

==== Armenians ====
There are about 4,000–10,000 Armenian citizens of Israel (not including Armenian Jews). They live mostly in Jerusalem, including the Armenian Quarter, but also in Tel Aviv, Haifa and Jaffa. Their religious activities center around the Armenian Patriarchate of Jerusalem as well as churches in Jerusalem, Haifa and Jaffa. Although Armenians of Old Jerusalem have Israeli identity cards, they are officially holders of Jordanian passports.

==== Caucasians ====
A number of immigrants also belong to various non-Slavic ethnic groups from the Former Soviet Union such as Tatars, Armenians, and Georgians.

==== Circassians ====
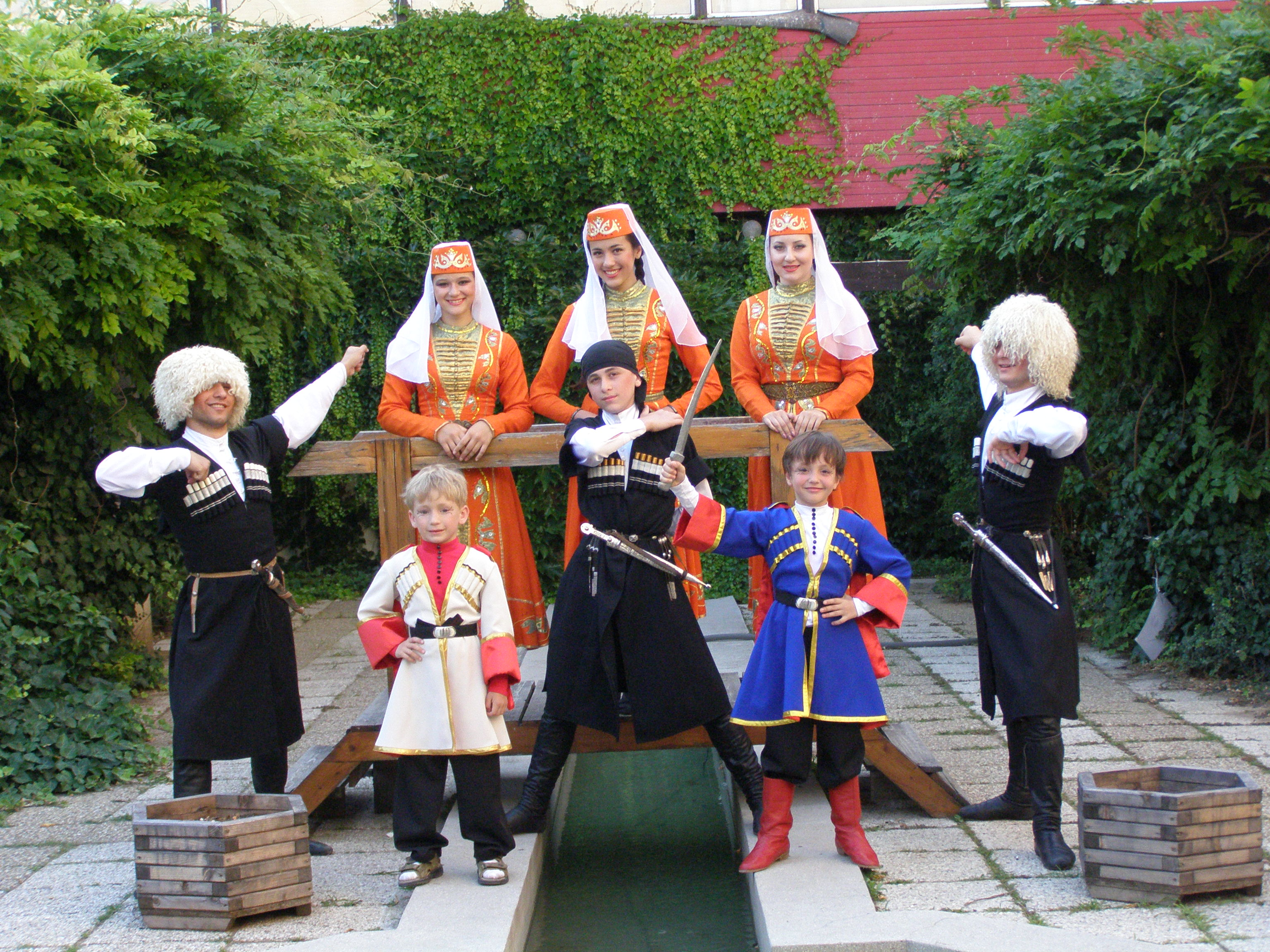
Circassian youth showcasing traditional male and female Circassian costumes in Israel

In Israel, there are also a few thousand Circassians, living mostly in Kfar Kama (2,000) and Reyhaniye (1,000). These two villages were a part of a greater group of Circassian villages around the Golan Heights. The Circassians in Israel enjoy, like Druzes, a status aparte. Male Circassians (at their leader's request) are mandated for military service, while females are not.

==== East Europeans ====
Non-Jewish immigrants from the former Soviet Union most of whom are Zera Yisrael (descendants of Jews) who are Russians, Ukrainians, Moldovans and Belarusians, who were eligible to immigrate due to having, or being married to somebody who has, at least one Jewish grandparent. In addition, a certain number of former Soviet citizens, primarily women of Russian and Ukrainian ethnicity, immigrated to Israel after marrying Arab citizens of Israel who went to study in the former Soviet Union in the 1970s and 1980s. The total number of those primarily of Slavic ancestry among Israeli citizens is around 300,000.

==== Finns ====
Although most Finns in Israel are either Finnish Jews or their descendants, a small number of Finnish Christians moved to Israel in the 1940s before the independence of the state and have since gained citizenship. For the most part the original Finnish settlers intermarried with other Israeli communities, and therefore remain very small in number. A moshav near Jerusalem named "Yad HaShmona", meaning the Memorial for the eight, was established in 1971 by a group of Finnish Christian Israelis, though today most members are Israeli, and predominantly Hebrew-speaking.

==== Samaritans ====
The Samaritans are an ethnoreligious group of the Levant. Ancestrally, they are descended from a group of Israelite inhabitants who have connections to ancient Samaria from the beginning of the Babylonian captivity up to the beginning of the Common Era. Population estimates made in 2007 show that of the 712 Samaritans, half live in Holon in Israel and half at Mount Gerizim in the West Bank. The Holon community holds Israeli citizenship, while the Gerizim community resides at an Israeli-controlled enclave (Kiryat Luza), holding dual Israeli-Palestinian citizenship.

==== Vietnamese ====
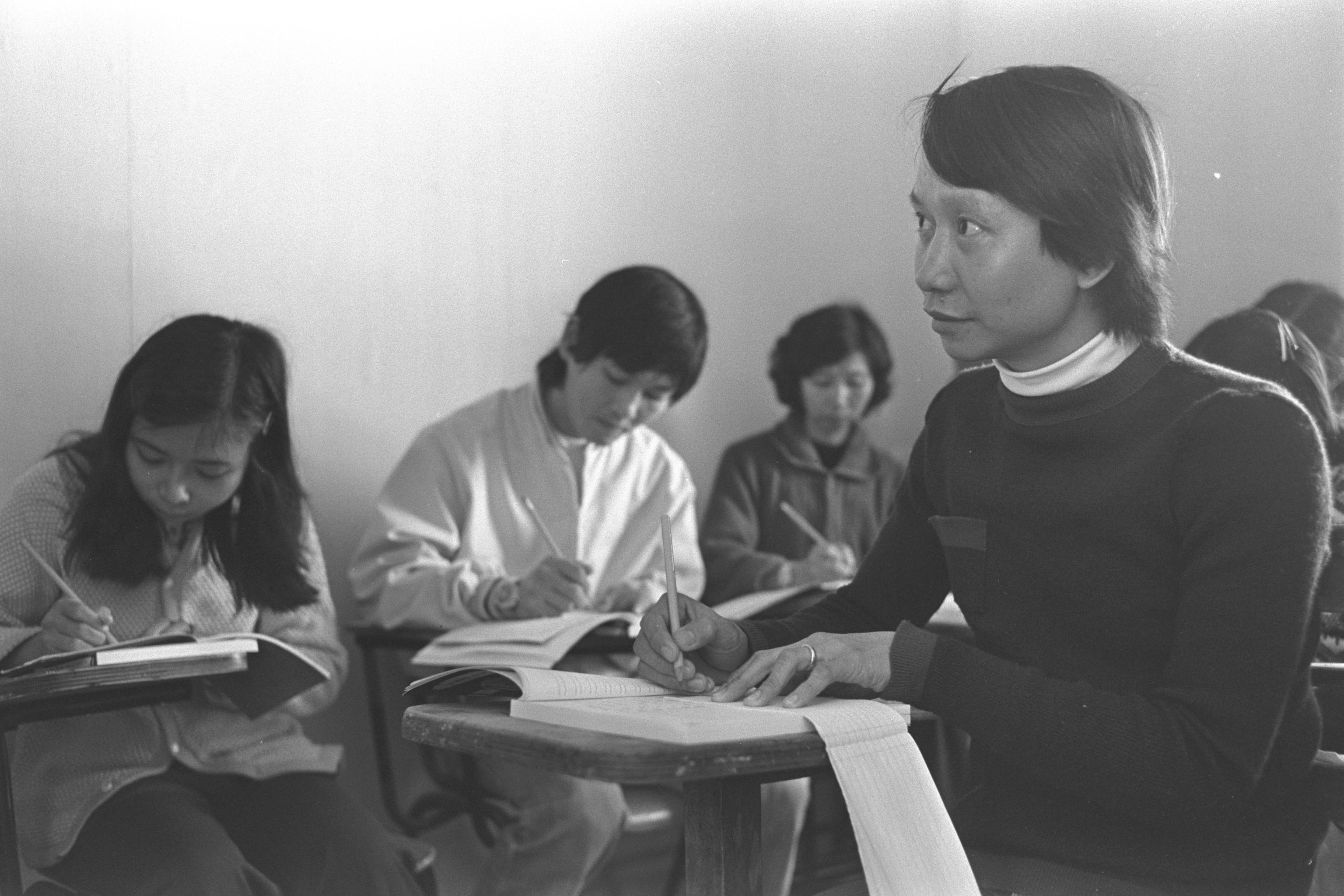
Ulpan for Vietnamese refugees in Afula, 1979

The number of Vietnamese people in Israel is estimated at 200–400. Most of them came to Israel between 1976 and 1979, after the Israeli Prime Minister Menachem Begin granted them political asylum. The Vietnamese people living in Israel are Israeli citizens who also serve in the Israel Defense Forces. Today, the majority of the community lives in the Gush Dan area in the center of Israel but also a few dozen Vietnamese-Israelis or Israelis of Vietnamese origin live in Haifa, Jerusalem and Ofakim.

=== Non-citizens ===
==== African refugees ====
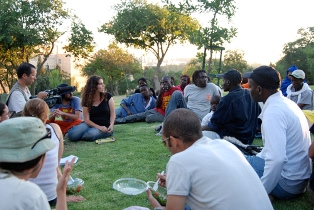
Meeting between Sudanese refugees and Israeli students, 2007

The number and status of African refugees in Israel is disputed and controversial, but it is estimated that at least 16,000 refugees, mainly from Eritrea, Sudan, South Sudan, Ethiopia and the Ivory Coast, reside and work in Israel. A check in late 2011, published in Ynet reported that the number just in Tel Aviv is 40,000, which represents 10 percent of the city's population. The vast majority lives in the southern parts of the city. There is also a significant African population in the southern Israeli cities of Eilat, Arad and Beer Sheva.

==== Other refugees ====
Approximately 100–200 refugees from Bosnia, Kosovo, and North Korea live in Israel as refugees, most of them with Israeli resident status.

=== Israeli diaspora ===
Through the years, the majority of Israelis who emigrated from Israel went to the United States, Canada and the United Kingdom.

It is currently estimated that there are 330,000 native-born Israelis, including 230,000 Jews, living abroad, or even more. The number of immigrants to Israel who later returned to their home countries or moved elsewhere is more difficult to calculate.

For many years definitive data on Israeli emigration was unavailable. In The Israeli Diaspora sociologist Stephen J. Gold maintains that calculation of Jewish emigration has been a contentious issue, explaining, "Since Zionism, the philosophy that underlies the existence of the Jewish state, calls for return home of the world's Jews, the opposite movement – Israelis leaving the Jewish state to reside elsewhere – clearly presents an ideological and demographic problem."

Among the most common reasons for emigration of Israelis from Israel are most often due to Israel's ongoing security issues, economic constraints, economic characteristics, disappointment in the Israeli government, as well as the excessive role of religion in the lives of Israelis.

==== United States ====
Many Israelis immigrated to the United States throughout the period of the declaration of the state of Israel and until today. Today, the descendants of these people are known as Israeli-Americans. According to the 2000 United States census, 106,839 Americans also hold Israeli citizenship, but the number of Americans of Israeli descent is around half a million.

==== Russia ====
Moscow has the largest single Israeli expatriate community in the world, with 80,000 Israeli citizens living in the city as of 2014, almost all of them native Russian-speakers. Many Israeli cultural events are hosted for the community, and many live part of the year in Israel. (To cater to the Israeli community, Israeli cultural centres are located in Moscow, Saint Petersburg, Novosibirsk and Yekaterinburg.)

==== Canada ====
Many Israelis immigrated to Canada throughout the period of the declaration of the state of Israel and until today. Today, the descendants of these people are known as Israeli-Canadians. According to the Canada 2006 Census as many as 21,320 Israelis lived in Canada in 2006.

==== United Kingdom ====
Many Israelis immigrated to the United Kingdom throughout and since the period of the declaration of the state of Israel. Today, the descendants of these people are known as Israeli-British. According to the United Kingdom 2001 Census, as many as 11,892 Israelis lived in the United Kingdom in 2001. The majority live in London.

=== 2013 Supreme Court ruling on nationality ===
In 2013 a three-judge panel of the Supreme Court of Israel's headed by Court President Asher Grunis rejected an appeal requesting that state-issued identification cards state the nationality of citizens as "Israeli" rather than their religion of origin. In his opinion, Grunis stated that it was not within the court's purview to determine new categories of ethnicity or nationhood. The court's decision responded to a petition by Uzzi Ornan, who refused to be identified as Jewish in 1948 at the foundation of the state of Israel, claiming instead that he was "Hebrew." This was permitted by Israeli authorities at the time. However, by 2000, Ornan wanted to register his nationality as "Israeli". The Interior Ministry refused to allow this, prompting Ornan to file a suit. In 2007, Ornan's suit was joined by former minister Shulamit Aloni and other activists. In the ruling, Justice Hanan Melcer noted Israel currently considers "citizenship and nationality [to be] separate."

== History ==
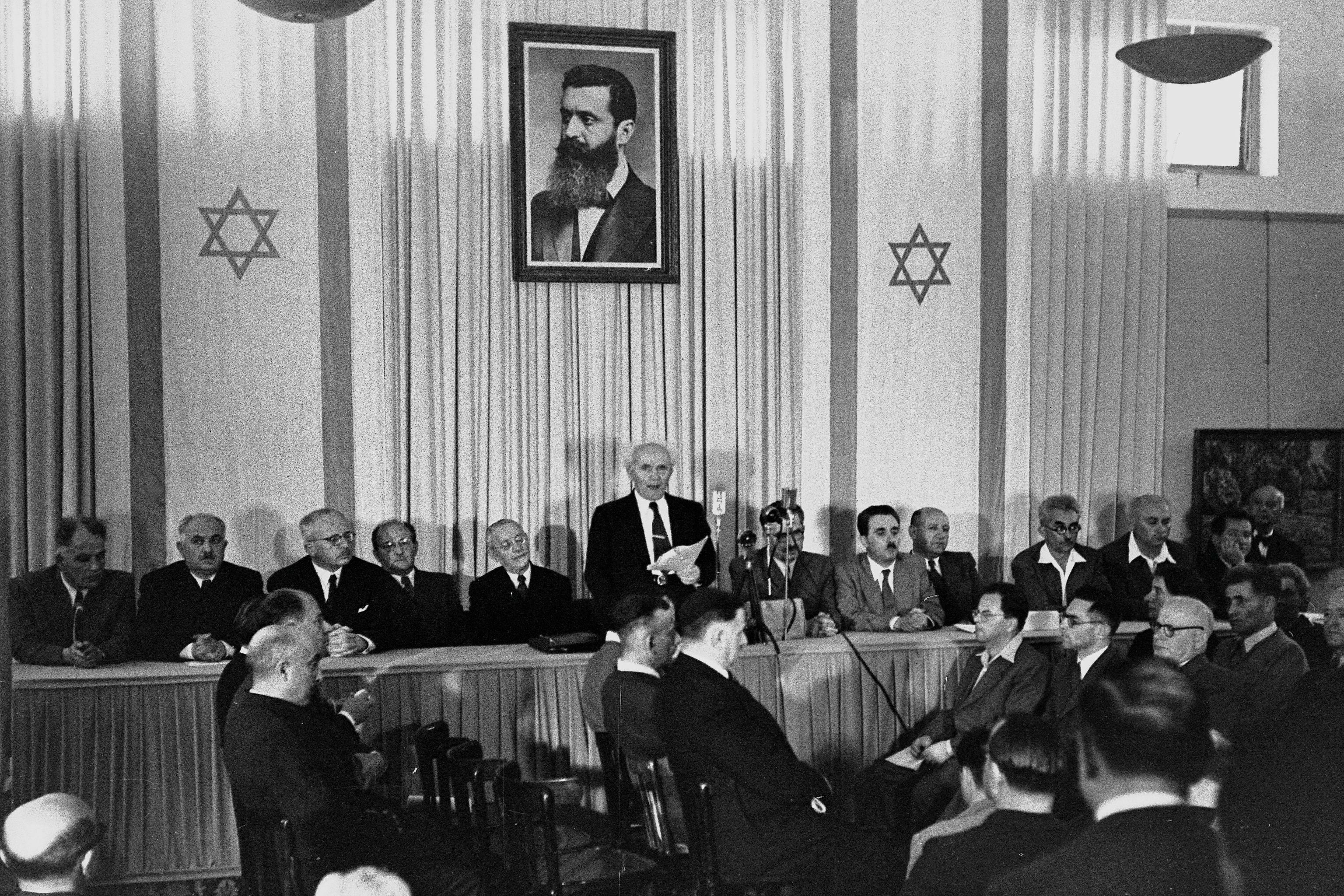
David Ben-Gurion proclaiming the Israeli Declaration of Independence in 1948

The term "Israelite" refers to members of the Jewish tribes and polities of the Iron Age known from the Hebrew Bible and extra-biblical historical and archaeological sources. The term "Israeli", by contrast, refers to the citizens of the modern State of Israel, regardless of them being Jewish, Arabs, or of any other ethnicity.

The modern State of Israel revived an old name known from the Hebrew Bible and from historical sources, that of the Iron Age Kingdom of Israel. The Bible differentiates between a period of tribal rule among the "children of Israel"; a Kingdom of Israel uniting all twelve biblical Israelite tribes, with the common capital known as the City of David (Jerusalem); and a period in which the northern tribes split away to form an independent Kingdom of Israel, while the southern tribes became part of the Kingdom of Judah. Archaeological research only partially agrees with the biblical narrative.

According to the biblical account, the United Monarchy was formed when there was a large popular expression in favour of introducing a monarchy to rule over the previously decentralised Israelite tribal confederacy. Increasing pressure from the Philistines and other neighboring tribes is said by the Bible to have forced the Israelites to unite as a more singular state.

The northern Kingdom of Israel was destroyed in c. 720 BCE by the Neo-Assyrian Empire and its population was forcibly restructured through imperial policy. The southern Kingdom of Judah was conquered by the Neo-Babylonian Empire (586 BCE), inherited by the Achaemenid Empire, conquered by Alexander the Great (332 BCE), ruled by the resulting Hellenistic empires, from which it regained autonomy and eventually independence under the Hasmoneans, conquered by the Roman Republic in 63 BCE, ruled by the client kings of the Herodian dynasty, and finally transformed into a Roman province during the first century CE. Two Jewish revolts, the second one ending in 135 CE, led to the large-scale decimation of the Jewish population in Judea and the end of any type of Jewish territorial self-rule in the southern Levant for many centuries to come.

Palestine was part of the Ottoman Empire from 1516 until it was taken by British forces in 1918. The British establishment of colonial political boundaries allowed the Jews to develop autonomous institutions such as the Histadrut. The resulting influx of Jewish immigrants, as well as the creation of many new settlements, was crucial for the functioning of these new institutions in what would, on 14 May 1948, become the State of Israel. By 1960, 25% of Israelis were Holocaust survivors.

== Culture ==
The largest cities in the country Haifa, Tel Aviv, and Jerusalem are also the major cultural centers, known for art museums, and many towns and kibbutzim have smaller high-quality museums. Israeli music is very versatile and combines elements of both western and eastern, religious and secular music. It tends to be very eclectic and contains a wide variety of influences from the Diaspora and more modern cultural importation: Hassidic songs, Asian and Arab pop, especially by Yemenite singers, and Israeli hip-hop or heavy metal. Folk dancing, which draws upon the cultural heritage of many immigrant groups, is popular. There is also flourishing modern dance.

=== Religion ===
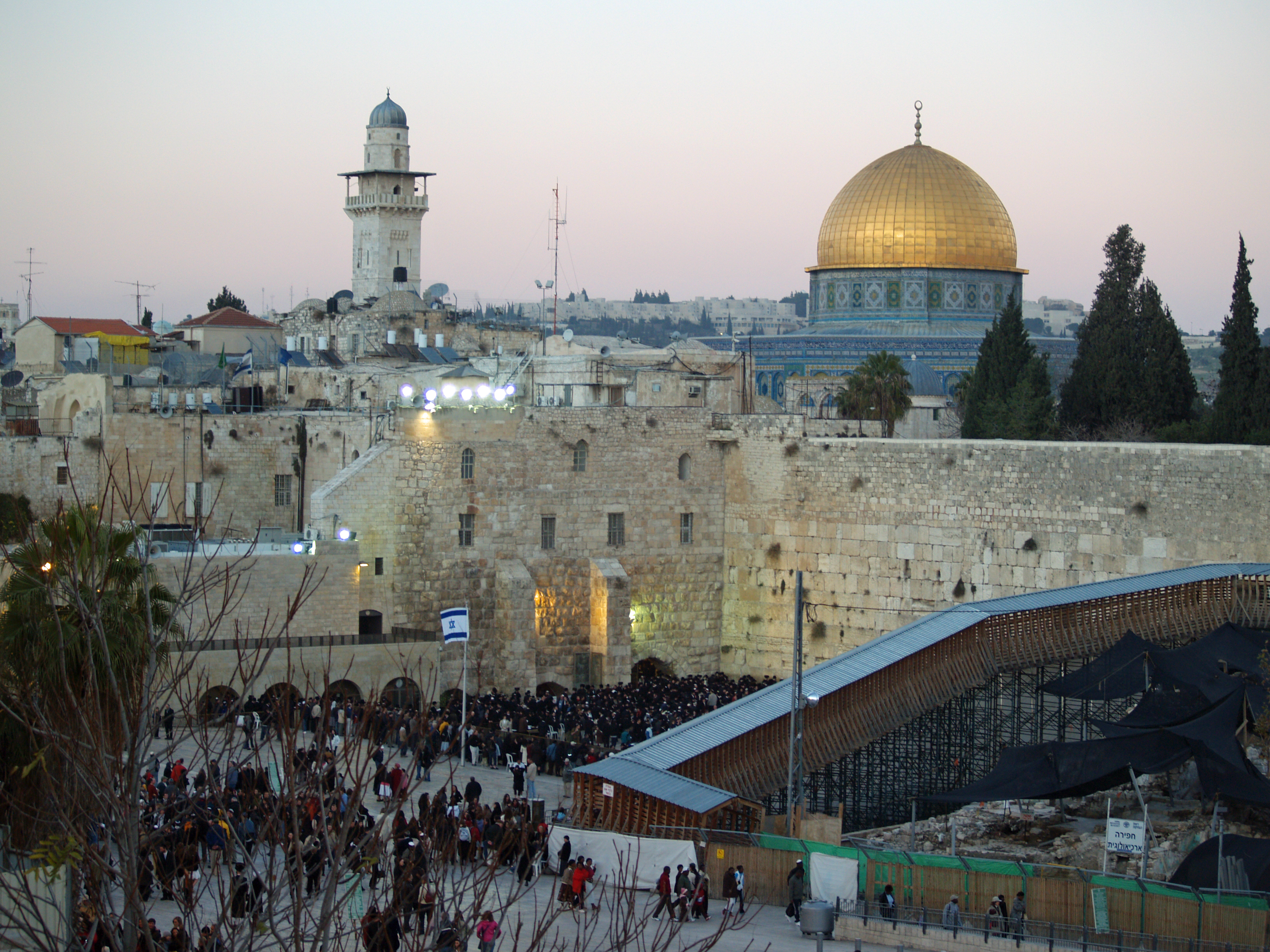
Western Wall and Dome of the Rock, Jerusalem

According to the Israel Central Bureau of Statistics, at the end of 2014, 75% of Israelis were Jewish by religion (adherents of Judaism), 17.5% were Muslims, 2% Christian, 1.6% Druze and the remaining 3.9% (including immigrants) were not classified by religion.

Roughly 12% of Israeli Jews defined as haredim (ultra-orthodox religious); an additional 9% are "religious"; 35% consider themselves "traditionalists" (not strictly adhering to Jewish religious law); and 43% are "secular" (termed "hiloni"). Among the seculars, 53% believe in God. However, 78% of all Israelis (and virtually all Israeli Jews) participate in a Passover seder.

Unlike North American Jews, Israelis tend not to align themselves with a movement of Judaism (such as Reform Judaism or Conservative Judaism) but instead tend to define their religious affiliation by degree of their religious practice. Israeli religious life, unlike much of North American Jewish life, does not solely revolve around synagogues or religious community centers.

Among Arab Israelis, 82.6% were Muslim (including Ahmadis), 8.8% were Christian and 8.4% were Druze.

The Baháʼí World Centre, which includes the Universal House of Justice, in Haifa attracts Baháʼí pilgrims from all over the world.

== Languages ==
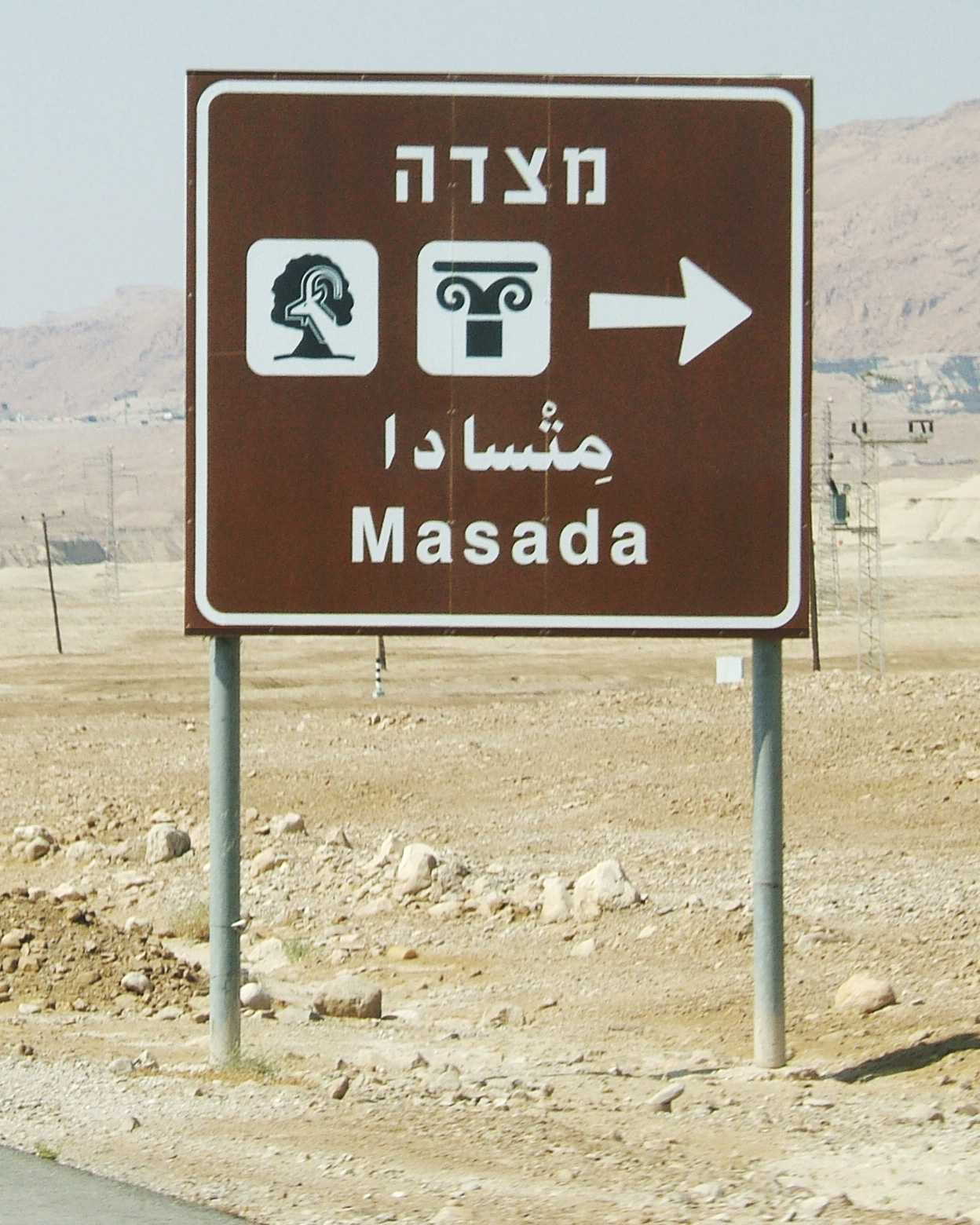
Trilingual road sign in Israel

Due to its immigrant nature, Israel is one of the most multicultural and multilingual societies in the world. Hebrew and Arabic are the official languages in the country, while English and Russian are the two most widely spoken non-official languages. Yiddish (2%) and French (2%) are also spoken. A certain degree of English is spoken widely, and is the language of choice for many Israeli businesses. Courses of Hebrew and English are mandatory in the Israeli matriculation exams (bagrut), and most schools also offer one or more out of Arabic, Spanish, German or French. The Israeli government also offers free intensive Hebrew-language courses, known as ulpanim (singular ulpan), for new Jewish immigrants, to try to help them integrate into Israeli society.

== See also ==
- Demographics of Israel
- Culture of Israel
- Modern Hebrew (Israeli Hebrew)
