= Ministry of Foreign Affairs and International Cooperation =

Ministry of Foreign Affairs and International Cooperation may refer to:

- Ministry of Foreign Affairs and International Cooperation (Botswana)
- Ministry of Foreign Affairs and International Cooperation (Cambodia)
- Ministry of Foreign Affairs and International Cooperation (Djibouti)
- Ministry of Foreign Affairs and International Cooperation (Equatorial Guinea)
- Ministry of Foreign Affairs and International Cooperation (Fiji)
- Ministry of Foreign Affairs and International Cooperation (Guyana)
- Ministry of Foreign Affairs and International Cooperation (Italy)
- Ministry of Foreign Affairs and International Cooperation (South Sudan)
- Ministry of Foreign Affairs and International Cooperation (Tanzania)
- Ministry of Foreign Affairs and International Cooperation (United Arab Emirates)
