= Australia–Fiji relations =

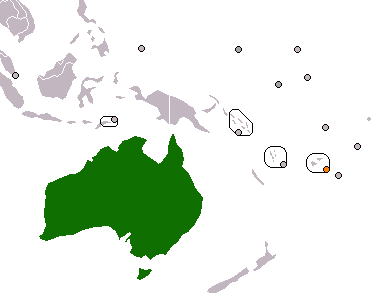

- Australia: Fiji

Monthly value of Australian merchandise exports to Fiji (A$ millions) since 1988

Monthly value of Fijian merchandise exports to Australia (A$ millions) since 1988

Monthly short term travel departures from Australia to Fiji since 1991

Bilateral relations exist between Australia and Fiji. Both countries have a High Commission in the other.

Australia and Fiji share a strong bilateral relationship with extensive people-to-people links and important trade, defense, and investment ties. The two countries are the founding members of the Ocean of Peace Alliance.

There are regular two-way exchanges between Australia and Fiji, including under Australian Government programs such as Australia Awards, the New Colombo Plan, Australian Volunteers and the Seasonal Worker Programme. The two countries are members of the Pacific Islands Forum.

== History ==
=== 19th century ===
Fiji and Australia share a long history, especially under the British Empire that held much of the world at its zenith. Fiji, like Australia, became a penal colony for the British empire under Queen Victoria's reign.

Fiji was a key supplier of sugar to the British colonies that lay in the Pacific during Queen Victoria's reign.

=== 20th century ===
Fiji became independent on 10 October 1970.

=== 21st century ===
Relations became strained due to Australia's condemnation of the military coup in Fiji which overthrew the government of Prime Minister Laisenia Qarase in December 2006. Military leader and "interim Prime Minister" Voreqe Bainimarama accused Australia of "bullying" Fiji by applying sanctions and by insisting on a swift return to a democratic government. In March 2008 the Fiji Human Rights Commission published a report which alleged that Australia might have been planning an armed intervention in Fiji in late 2006. (Note: Compare Operation Quickstep) Australian Foreign Minister Stephen Smith dismissed the allegations, and stated: "The best thing that can happen in Fiji is not spurious suggestions about Australian activity but having an election, returning Fiji to democracy, respecting human rights".

On 4 November 2009, Fijian military leader, Voreqe (Frank) Bainimarama, expelled the Australian High Commissioner James Batley and his New Zealand counterpart. He said that Australia and New Zealand had tried to undermine Fiji's judiciary and to weaken its economy. New Zealand and Australia disputed key aspects of Fiji's claims. In response, Australia quickly expelled Fiji's acting high commissioner, Kamlesh Kumar Arya.

In September 2019 Australian Prime Minister Scott Morrison and Frank Bainimarama signed a vuvale (meaning "family") agreement covering economic, security, cultural and sporting support.

In July 2026, the two countries signed a mutual defense pact known as the Ocean of Peace Alliance and a separate economic treaty called the Vuvale Union that would involve Australia to invest A$1 billion ($693) into Fiji's economy and allow more Fijians to come to Australia. In response to the Australian-Fijian defence treaty, Chinese Foreign Ministry spokeswoman Mao Ning urged Australia to respect the independence of Pacific island nations and "to avoid... harming the interests of any third parties."

== Cooperation ==
Australia remains a substantial donor of foreign aid to Fiji. In 2018-19, Fiji received $58.1 million in aid from Australia. In 2021, the Australian government pledged to provide a $68 million loan to Fiji to upgrade its airports, as part of a step-up in infrastructure lending across the Pacific to help the region recover from the COVID-19 pandemic. In 2021, the Australian government also pledged approximately $2 million to support a new Super Rugby franchise named the Fijian Drua, who would compete with teams from Australia and New Zealand from 2022 onwards. In 2026, Australia and Fiji signed a mutual defense pact, the Ocean of Peace Alliance, after the previous Fijian government had instead sought closer relations to China.

== See also ==
- Foreign relations of Australia
- Foreign relations of Fiji
