= History of the Jews in Oceania =

The history of the Jews in Oceania starts with early explorers, sealers and whalers. Jewish and other settlers arrived in Oceania from the eighteenth century. They settled in Australia and New Zealand, and then on the smaller islands of Oceania.

== New Zealand ==
The history of the Jewish people in New Zealand began when Jewish traders arrived there during the 1830s. Before New Zealand became a British Colony in 1840, the Jewish population consisted of fewer than 30 people, including noted early settler Joel Samuel Polack. Immigration has led to four main groups: older families who came from the United Kingdom in the nineteenth century, lineage of European refugees from the 1930s and 1940s, families who emigrated from Britain in the 1950s, and recent immigrants from South Africa, Israel and the former Soviet Union. Prominent New Zealand Jews include nineteenth century Premier Sir Julius Vogel and at least five Auckland mayors, including Dove-Myer Robinson.

In the 2013 New Zealand Census, 6,867 individuals professed an affiliation with Judaism, out of the total New Zealand population of 4.5 million. The majority of New Zealand Jews reside in Auckland and Wellington.

== See also ==
- Australia
- Fiji
- Guam
- New Zealand
- Palau

And in Southeast Asia:

- Indonesia
- Malaysia
- The Philippines
- Singapore
