= Fiji–France relations =

- France: Fiji

Fiji–France relations are the bilateral relations between France and Fiji. France has an embassy in Suva, but Fiji has no diplomatic representation in France. Relations were strained, due to France's condemnation of the coup d'état in Fiji in December 2006. Previously, relations had primarily been centred on military cooperation, with France assisting Fiji in surveilling its maritime zone, and on development aid.

== History ==
Diplomatic relations between the two countries were established in 1970. In 1983, Fiji and France signed a treaty that set out the maritime boundary between Fiji and the French collectivity of New Caledonia and the maritime boundary between Fiji and the Wallis and Futuna collectivity of France. In 2000, the French Government condemned the 2000 Fijian coup d'état.

== Assistance from France ==
In 2004, France was the first foreign state to offer assistance to Fiji, sending naval aircraft from the nearby islands of New Caledonia taking part in efforts to locate several fishermen lost at sea.

== See also ==
- Foreign relations of Fiji
- Foreign relations of France
