= Fiji–Russia relations =

- Russia: Fiji

Fiji–Russia relations refers to bilateral relations between Fiji and Russia. Neither country has a resident ambassador, the Ambassador of Russia in Fiji is Alexander Blokhin who also is the Ambassador to Australia, Vanuatu and Nauru. He is stationed in Canberra, Australia.

== History ==
Fiji had established diplomatic relations with the Soviet Union on January 30, 1974, but there was almost no sense of any relations between the two. But it was only after a deterioration of relations between Fiji and Australia and New Zealand along with the United States in 2009, Fiji began to strengthen its ties with both Russia and China.

On February 8, 2010, Ambassador Isikeli Mataitoga presented credentials to Russian President Dmitry Medvedev. The ambassador had met with a number of Russian officials including Alexey Borodavkin, the deputy minister of Foreign Affairs, and senior officials of the Ministry of Economic Development, Ministry of Agriculture, the Federal Fisheries Agency and the Russian Federation of Chamber of Commerce and Industry. The meeting was intended to foster cooperation between Russia and Fiji in the areas of trade and investment and to increase bilateral ties between the two countries. In May 2010, a group consisting of Fiji lawyers and Russian businessmen met with a view of establishing the Fiji Russian Business Council.

In early 2016, Fiji and Russia have made an arms deal worth $8.8M to rearm the Republic of Fiji Military Forces.

The 20th of September, 2021 Dr Philipp G. Khanin was appointed Honorary Consul of the Republic of Fiji in Saint Petersburg. The Consul district includes Saint Petersburg, Republic of Karelia, Republic of Komi, Arkhangelsk, Vologda, Kaliningrad, Leningrad, Murmansk, Novgorod, Pskov regions, Nenets Autonomous Area.

== High-level visits ==
In February 2012, Russian Minister of Foreign Affairs Sergey Lavrov visited Fiji in the first-ever visit of a high-level official.
