= Fiji–Israel relations =

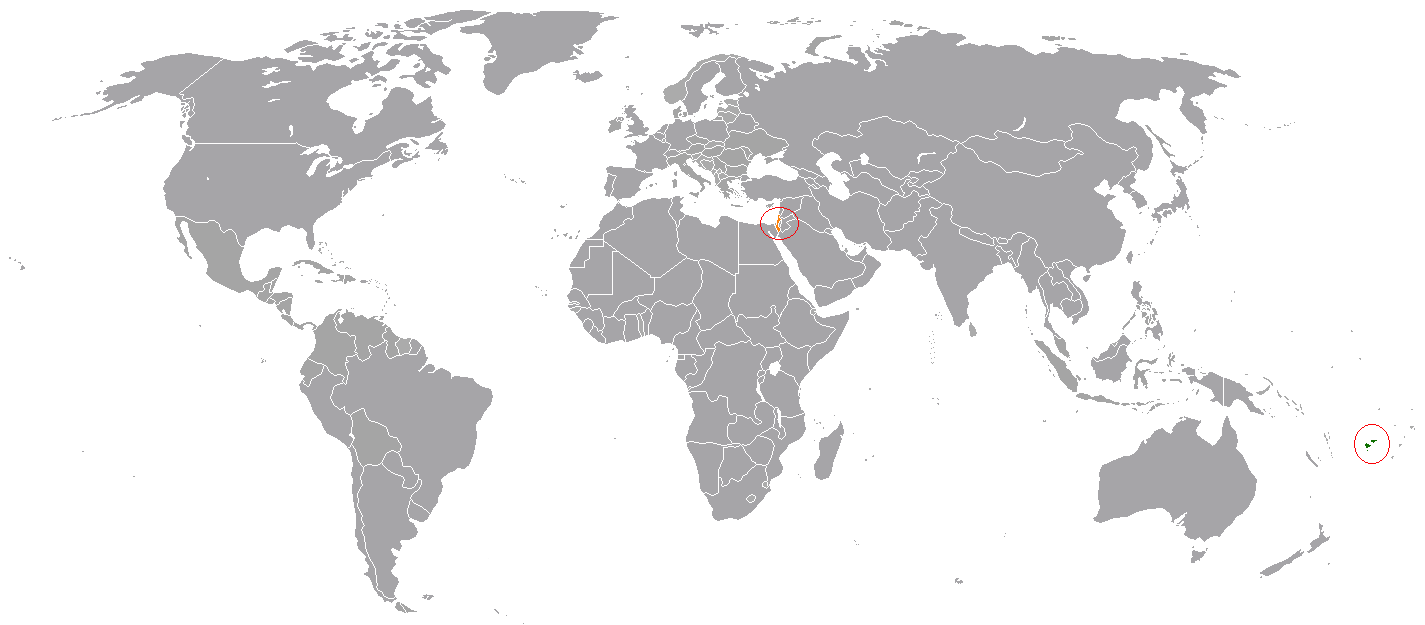

- Fiji: Israel

Fiji–Israel relations were established in 1970. Relations between Fiji and Israel have generally been satisfactory. Since September 2025, Fiji has had an embassy in Jerusalem; the Israeli embassy in Fiji was opened on June 2, 2026.

== History ==
Despite being both former colonies of the British Empire, the first major visit to Israel by a Fijian official took place in 1978.

In 2016, Israeli prime minister Benjamin Netanyahu met with Fijian prime minister Frank Bainimarama and thanked him.

In 2020, Israeli President Reuven Rivlin visited Fiji as part of a Pacific island nations' summit. In 2022, President Ratu Wiliame M. Katonivere visited Israel and met President Isaac Herzog at his official residence. In their meeting, they agreed to expand Israeli-Fijian relations with an emphasis on the potential use of Israeli environmental technologies and Israeli experience in the field of food security.

Following the 2022 Fijian general election, which resulted in a hung parliament, saw the People's Alliance, the National Federation Party (NFP) and the Social Democratic Liberal Party (SODELPA) begin negotiating to form a coalition government. SODELPA stated that opening an embassy in Jerusalem was one of the conditions for forming government with the two parties. The negotiations were successful and Fiji reaffirmed its commitment to opening an embassy in Jerusalem. The embassy was finally opened on 17 September 2025, with Israeli Prime Minister Benjamin Netanyahu and his Fijian counterpart, Sitiveni Rabuka, wearing traditional Fijian garlands during the ceremony. On 3 February 2026, Jesoni Vitusagavulu presented his credentials to Isaac Herzog, becoming Fiji's first resident ambassador to Israel.

== See also ==
- Foreign relations of Fiji
- Foreign relations of Israel
- History of the Jews in Fiji
