= List of diplomatic missions of Fiji =

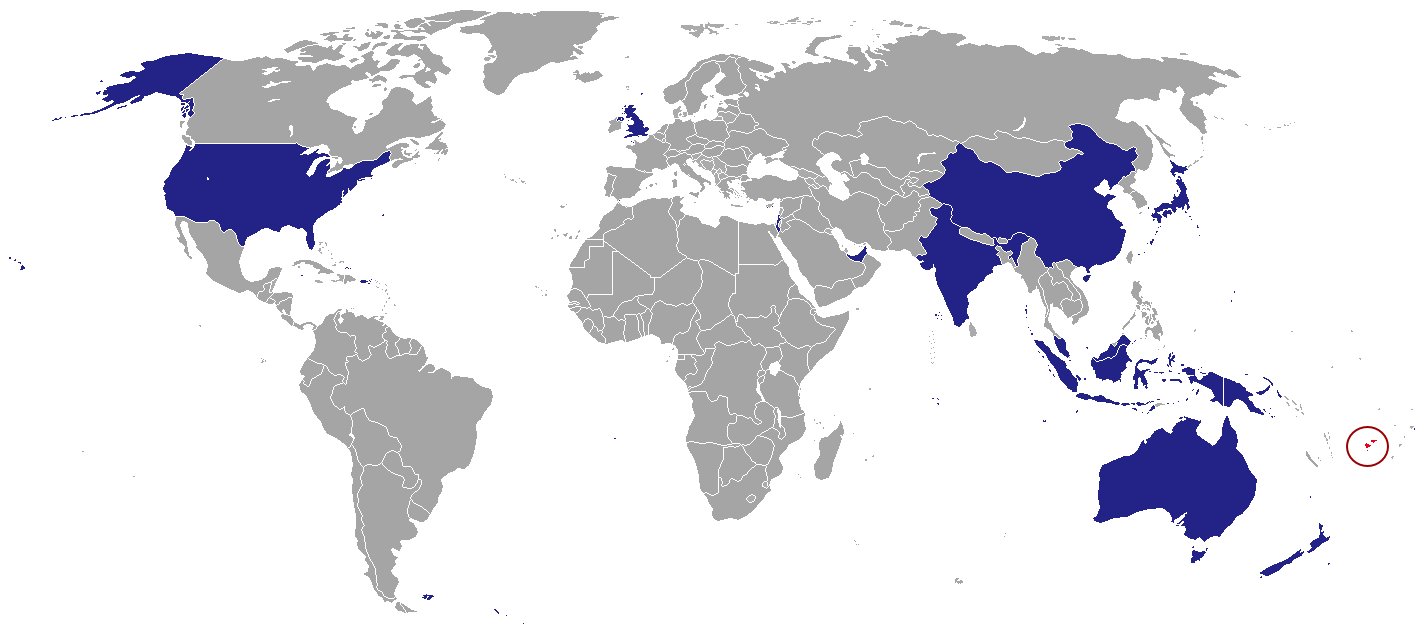
Diplomatic missions of Fiji

This is a list of diplomatic missions of Fiji, which are maintained by the country's Ministry of Foreign Affairs and International Cooperation.

== Current missions ==
=== Americas ===
Host country	Host city	Mission	Concurrent accreditation	Ref.
United States	Washington, D.C.	Embassy	Countries: Canada; Mexico	

=== Asia ===
Host country	Host city	Mission	Concurrent accreditation	Ref.
China	Beijing	Embassy		
India	New Delhi	High Commission	Countries: Bangladesh; Bhutan; Mauritius; Nepal; Sri Lanka	
Indonesia	Jakarta	Embassy	Countries: Philippines; Singapore; Thailand; Timor-Leste; Multilateral Organizations: United Nations Economic and Social Commission for Asia and the Pacific	
Israel	Jerusalem	Embassy		
Japan	Tokyo	Embassy		
Malaysia	Kuala Lumpur	High Commission		
United Arab Emirates	Abu Dhabi	Embassy	Countries: Qatar; Saudi Arabia; Multilateral Organizations: International Renewable Energy Agency	

=== Europe ===
Host country	Host city	Mission	Concurrent accreditation	Ref.
United Kingdom	London	High Commission	Countries: Holy See; Ireland; Morocco; Multilateral Organizations: Commonwealth of Nations; International Maritime Organization; International Sugar Organization	

=== Oceania ===
Host country	Host city	Mission	Concurrent accreditation	Ref.
Australia	Canberra	High Commission		
Australia	Sydney	Consulate-General		
New Zealand	Wellington	High Commission	Countries: Cook Islands; Niue; Peru	
Papua New Guinea	Port Moresby	High Commission	Countries: Solomon Islands; Vanuatu	

=== Multilateral organizations ===
Organization	Host city	Host country	Mission	Concurrent accreditation	Ref.
United Nations	Geneva	Switzerland	Permanent Mission	Countries: Switzerland	
United Nations	New York City	United States	Permanent Mission	Countries: Guatemala; Multilateral Organizations: United Nations Environment Programme	

== Gallery ==
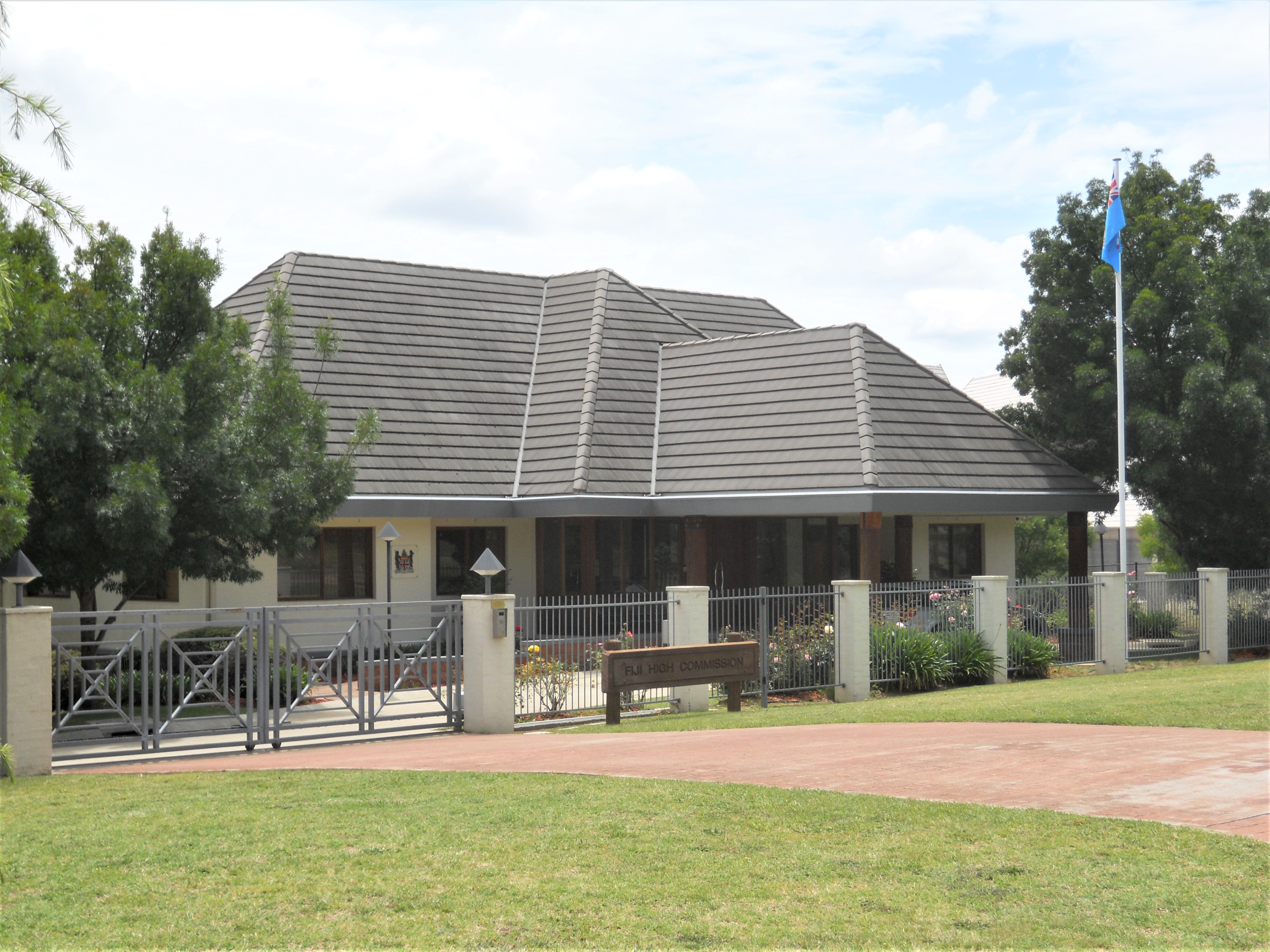
High Commission in Canberra

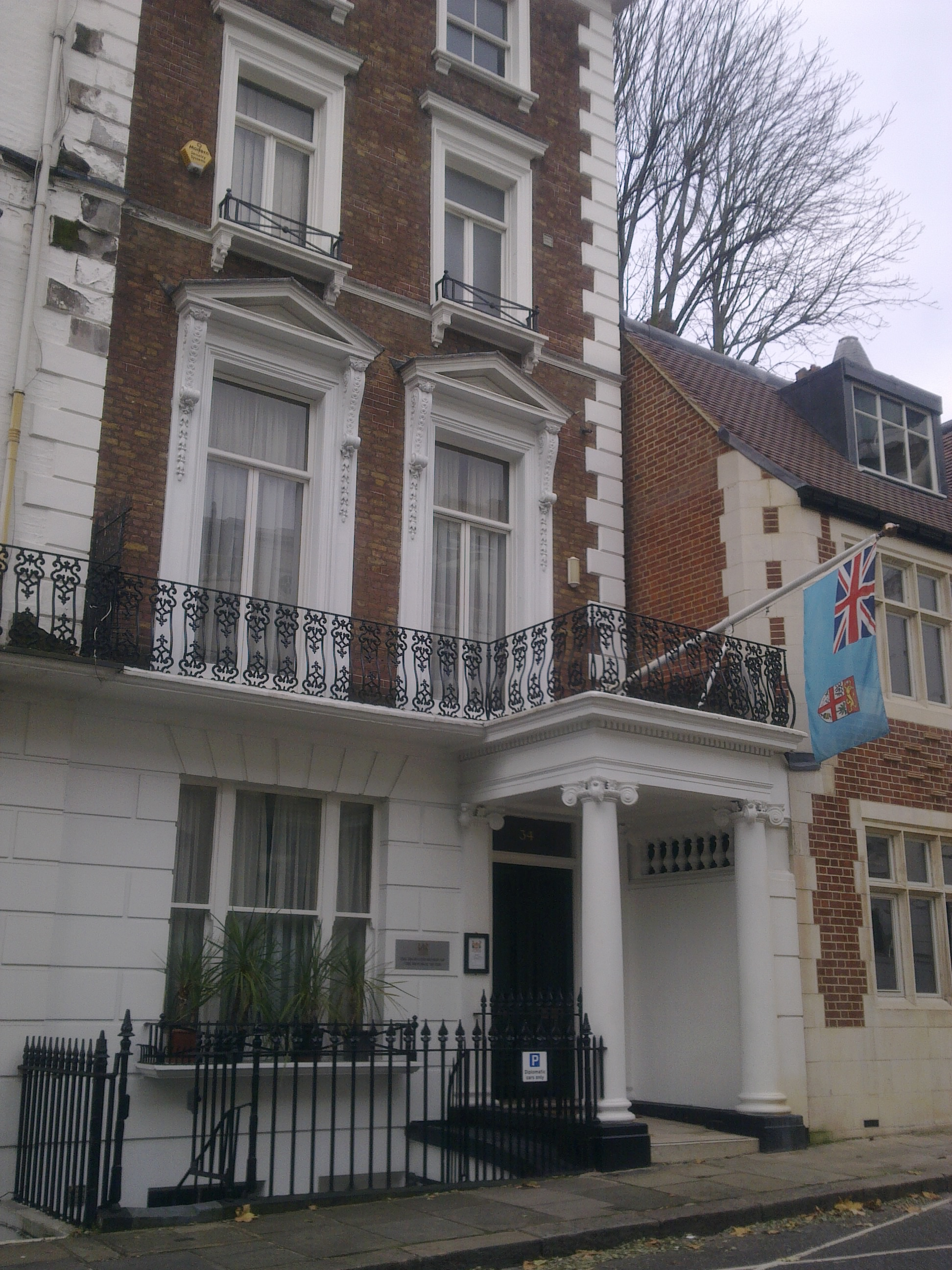
High Commission in London

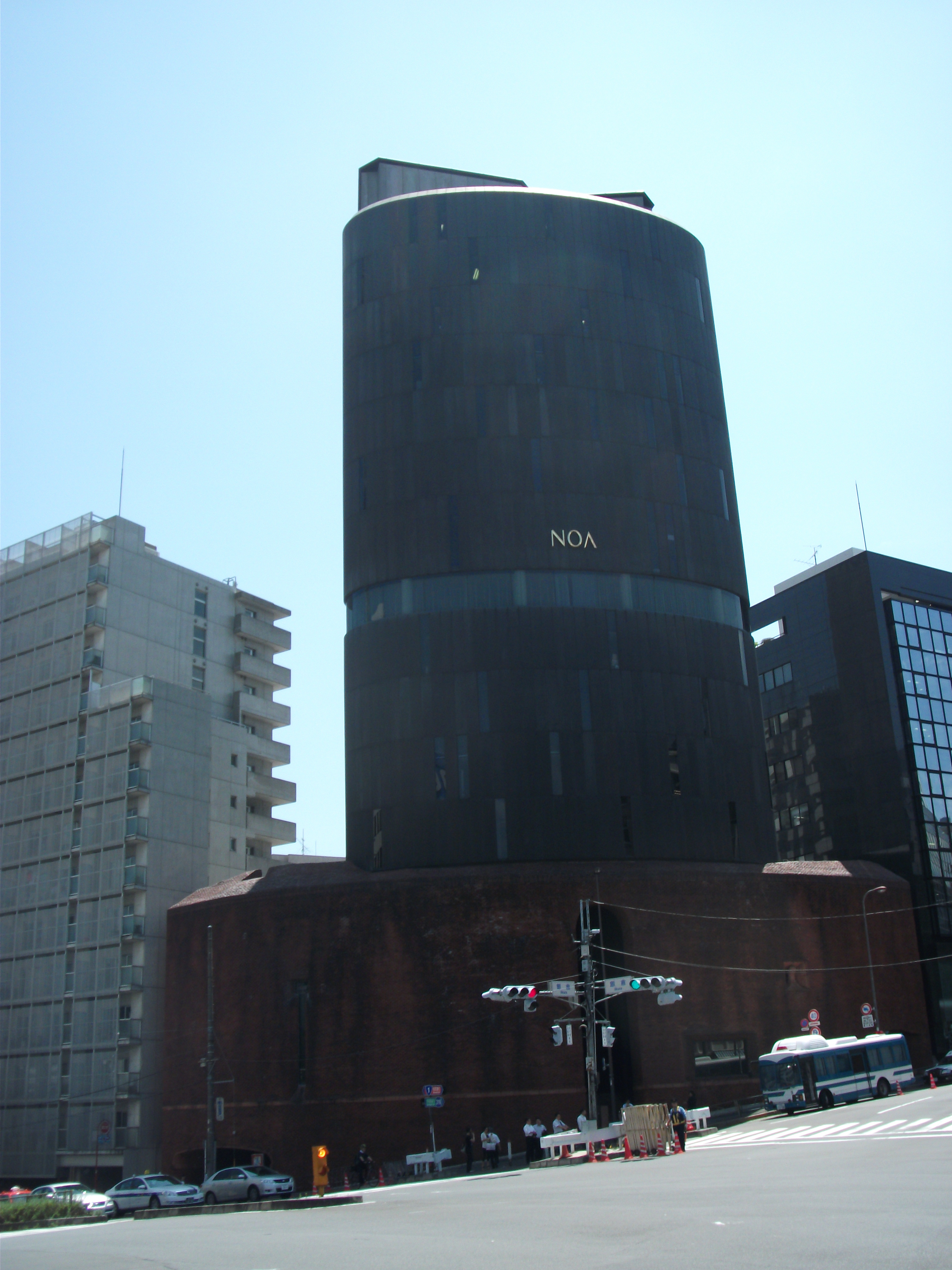
Building hosting the Embassy in Tokyo

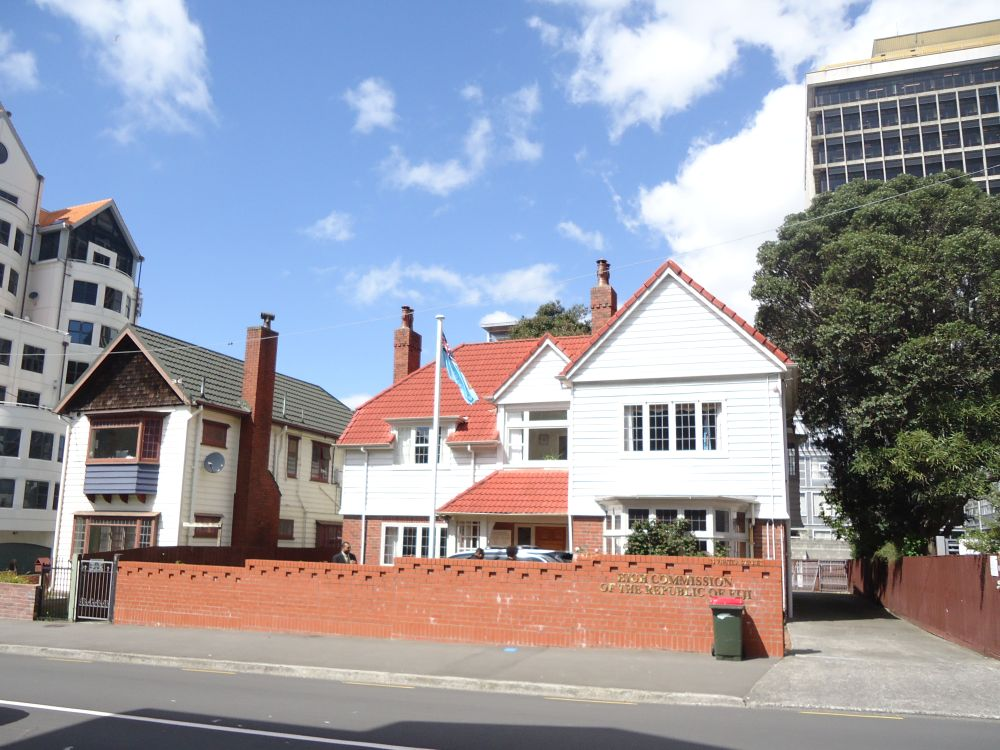
High Commission in Wellington

== Closed missions ==
=== Africa ===
Host country	Host city	Mission	Year closed	Ref.
Ethiopia	Addis Ababa	Embassy	2019	
South Africa	Pretoria	High Commission	2015	

=== Americas ===
Host country	Host city	Mission	Year closed	Ref.
Brazil	Brasília	Embassy	2019	

=== Asia ===
Host country	Host city	Mission	Year closed	Ref.
South Korea	Seoul (Note: To be reopened)	Embassy	2020	

=== Europe ===
Host country	Host city	Mission	Year closed	Ref.
Belgium	Brussels (Note: To be reopened)	Embassy	2021	

== Mission to open ==
Host country	Host city	Mission	Ref.
Belgium	Brussels	Embassy	
South Korea	Seoul	Embassy	

== See also ==
- Foreign relations of Fiji
- List of diplomatic missions in Fiji
- Visa policy of Fiji
