= History of the Jews in Guam =

Guamanian Jews יהודי גואם
Languages
- English, Hebrew, Chamorro

Religion
- Judaism

The history of the Jews in Guam, a territory of the United States in the western Pacific Ocean, dates back to at least 1899. A high point in Jewish activity in Guam was during the time of World War II. Jews have continued to live there since, although as a small presence. As of 2009, there are approximately 150 Jews in Guam, of which about a third are religiously active.

== History ==
During the late 19th century, the Spanish colony Guam was – as part of the Spanish–American War – conquered by, and ceded to, the United States. For a brief period in 1899, the year following the annexation, the Jewish naval officer Edward D. Taussig served as Governor of Guam. He was the first American officer in charge of the territory. During his short governorship, Taussig carried out a number of actions, among them the establishment of a local government consisting of native Chamorro people.

Having been ousted by the Empire of Japan in 1941, American troops recaptured Guam in 1944 following years of occupation. In the wake of this, large amounts of military forces were deployed to the area – whether from the army, the navy, or other branches. Some of the personnel deployed were of Jewish origin, both secular and religious. One example of this was Lt. Miriam Miller, a member of the United States Navy Nurse Corps who aided troops wounded across the Pacific theatre. Some Jewish personnel in Guam were politically active, establishing the Guam Zionist Club after some of them decided that they should try to keep zionism alive among themselves. The association put out a mimeographed newspaper for its members, and advertised activities in regular military publications. The book The Jews' Secret Fleet, in which the author Murray Greenfield described the participation of North American sailors in Aliyah Bet, mentions how one individual came into contact with the secret operation through a newsletter for Jewish servicemen while stationed at Guam.

In 1945, 1,500 servicemen celebrated the Jewish holiday Rosh Hashanah at Guam, in a Boeing B-29 Superfortress hangar converted to the purpose by non-Jewish personnel of the Twentieth Air Force. The hangar was equipped with seats, a pulpit, a Torah ark to hold sacred scrolls, special lighting, and public address systems. A souvenir prayer book was printed as well. Chaplain David I. Cedarbaum officiated the ceremony, while others led the attending choir and blew the shofar.

A single Jewish synagogue once existed on Guam. It was however destroyed in 1962, during an exceptionally strong typhoon. Despite this, members of the congregation continued to assemble. In 1976, a military chapel was dedicated for use by practitioners of Judaism by the US Navy and Air Force. Religious activity continue into the 21st century, with for example Jews represented in the Guam Interfaith Committee which began its activities in 2005. Occasionally, visiting rabbis from New York City help the Jewish community in Guam practice for example bar and bat mitzvahs.

== See also ==
- History of the Jews in Oceania
- History of the Jews in the United States
