= Ocean of Peace Alliance =

Mutual defense pact

Veitacini Treaty
- Type: Mutual defense pact
- Signed: 6 July 2026
- Location: State House, Suva, Fiji
- Signatories: Anthony Albanese (Prime Minister of Australia); Sitiveni Rabuka (Prime Minister of Fiji)
- Parties: Australia; Fiji
- Languages: English

The Ocean of Peace Alliance, also known as the Veitacini Treaty or Veitacini Mutual Defence Treaty, is a mutual defense pact between Australia and Fiji. It was signed by the Prime Minister of Fiji, Sitiveni Rabuka, and the Prime Minister of Australia, Anthony Albanese, at State House in Suva on 6 July 2026. The treaty commits each country to come to the other's aid in the event of an armed attack in the Pacific, providing collective security. It is Fiji's first alliance and Australia's fourth.

The alliance was signed alongside a broader agreement, the Vuvale Union, and is described by both governments as the first treaty to give practical effect to the regional "Blue Pacific Ocean of Peace" vision endorsed by Pacific leaders in 2025. Widely described in media reports as a counter to China, the treaty is open to accession by other Pacific Island countries.

== Background ==
Australia and Fiji have a long history of defence and diplomatic cooperation. In 2023 the two countries signed the Vuvale Partnership, a framework for wider cooperation, the name of which is Fijian word vuvale, meaning "family". The Ocean of Peace Alliance and the accompanying Vuvale Union expand on that partnership and move the relationship to a more permanent institutional footing.

The treaty was concluded during a period of intensified Australian diplomacy in the Pacific that also produced new agreements with Tuvalu, Nauru, Papua New Guinea, and Vanuatu. Commentators linked the activity to growing strategic competition in the region, including China's expanding diplomatic, economic, and security presence and its 2022 security agreement with Solomon Islands. Both governments said they did not intend the treaty to be presented as directed against China.

For Fiji, the alliance marked a departure from the country's traditionally non-aligned foreign policy, which had sought to balance relationships with Australia, New Zealand, China, and other powers. The initiative was primarily driven by Prime Minister Rabuka.

== Signing ==
The treaty was signed at State House in Suva on Monday 6 July 2026, in the presence of the President of Fiji, Ratu Naiqama Lalabalavu. The ceremony was witnessed by Fiji's Minister for Foreign Affairs and External Trade, Sakiasi Ditoka, the Australian Minister for Foreign Affairs, Penny Wong, and Australia's High Commissioner to Fiji, Peter Roberts, along with cabinet ministers and members of the diplomatic corps.

During the visit, Albanese was awarded the honor of Honorary Companion of the Order of Fiji, Fiji's highest civilian honor, in recognition of his contribution to Fiji–Australia relations and Pacific regional security.

== Provisions ==
The treaty combines a mutual defense commitment with mechanisms for consultation and security cooperation.

- Consultation (Article 5): The parties commit to consult whenever a "security-related development that threatens the sovereignty, peace or stability" of either country arises, in order to decide whether any measures should be taken.
- Mutual defence (Article 6): Each party recognises that an armed attack on the other within the Pacific "would be dangerous to each other's peace and security", and undertakes to "act to meet the common danger, in accordance with its domestic processes". Analysts noted that although the wording differs from the collective defense clause of the NATO treaty, it creates a stronger security obligation than earlier bilateral agreements between Australia and individual Pacific states.
- Visiting forces (Article 7): The treaty establishes arrangements for military cooperation and the hosting of each country's forces.

Other provisions address democratic values, respect for sovereignty, and the resolution of disputes through dialogue and consensus in keeping with the "Pacific Way", the ethos associated with the Pacific Islands Forum. The treaty draws on the ideals of the 2050 Strategy for the Blue Pacific Continent and frames security in regional rather than purely bilateral terms.

The alliance is open to other Pacific Island countries that are "in a position to further the purposes and principles of this treaty and to contribute to the security of the Pacific". According to the ABC, Australia was initially expected to look at extending the treaty to Pacific nations that maintain a standing military, including New Zealand, Papua New Guinea and Tonga.

The treaty is accompanied by Australian government spending of more than A$1 billion over a decade on measures against transnational crime as well as education, health and infrastructure in Fiji.

== Reactions ==
=== Australia ===
Albanese described the signing as "one of the most significant endeavors Australia has undertaken with any country" and said there was "no higher obligation than to come to each other's aid at a time of need". Rabuka called the agreement a "very significant elevation" of the relationship and "a clear affirmation of Australia's sustained commitment to the stability, resilience and prosperity of the Blue Pacific region". He said he was confident other Pacific leaders were waiting to join, stating "the more, the stronger, the better".

=== New Zealand ===
A spokesperson for New Zealand's foreign ministry said the government "welcomed" the alliance, noting New Zealand's existing bond with Fiji and its military alliance with Australia. The New Zealand government subsequently said it would explore joining the alliance. Prime Minister Christopher Luxon said that because New Zealand already worked with both countries on regional security, "engaging with them on this alliance is logical", and that being involved early would help determine which other Pacific countries could join. Foreign Affairs Minister Winston Peters said the alliance underscored a long-standing approach of Pacific-led responses to regional security, while Defence Minister Chris Penk affirmed New Zealand's commitment to deeper defense and security cooperation with Fiji. A final decision on membership was left to Cabinet.

=== China ===
China had criticized some of Australia's recent strategic pacts, accusing Canberra of using them as a "geopolitical tool"; Rabuka said he did not believe the treaty would prompt "severe pushback" from Beijing and that it did not threaten either country's relationship with China.

Anna Powles, a Pacific security expert at Massey University, said Beijing would likely view the alliance as a "form of strategic containment" and that it "opens the door for a wider Pacific security coalition". She suggested that an "expandable alliance under the Ocean of Peace banner" could represent the most significant innovation in Pacific security architecture since the Boe Declaration, shifting the region from a collection of bilateral agreements towards a "networked, Pacific-centered security framework".

== See also ==
- Foreign relations of Fiji
- Foreign relations of Australia
- Quadrilateral Security Dialogue
- Pacific Islands Forum
- Falepili Union
