= Fiji–Tonga relations =

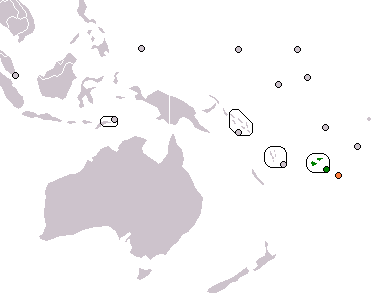

- Fiji: Tonga

Fiji–Tonga relations are foreign relations between Fiji and Tonga. These neighbouring countries in the South Pacific have a history of bilateral relations going back several centuries.

Though relations between the two countries had been good since they both became independent in the 1970s, they deteriorated considerably in early 2011.

== History ==
Fiji has a lot of influence from Tonga and vice versa. Starting with the kingdom of Tu'i Pulotu located in Fiji. After the Tu'i Pulotu kingdom, came the Tu'i Tonga Empire. There was then a full-scale war due to the Tongans invading under the leadership of the son of the Tu'i Kanokupolu (Ma'afu). The Empire subsequently declined, but Tonga remained an influential neighbour in Fiji affairs. In 1848, Tongan Prince Maʻafu settled in Lakeba, establishing a new foothold in Eastern Fiji. He was accompanied by Tongan Wesleyan missionaries, who consolidated the earlier introduction of Methodism to Fiji by English Wesleyan missionaries. Today, Methodism is the primary religion of indigenous Fijians.

Maʻafu's influence in Fiji expanded during the 1850s, threatening Seru Epenisa Cakobau's attempts to establish himself as king of all Fiji. Ultimately, Maʻafu and Tonga's support at the 1855 Battle of Kaba was instrumental in enabling Cakobau to cement his leadership over Fiji, temporarily consolidating the Tongan Prince's status and role in the country. Tonga's direct influence faded, however, after Cakobau ceded Fiji to British sovereignty in 1874.

== Contemporary relations ==
=== Politics and diplomacy ===
Fiji's Prime Minister Voreqe Bainimarama received "cheers and thunderous applause" from the Tongan public when he attended a Pacific Islands Forum meeting in Tonga in October 2007; the crowd's "enthusiastic reception" of Fiji's leader was likened to "that accorded to a rock star" Radio Australia noted that he had been "the star of this year's meeting, for the people of Tonga", while One News reported that he had been "given a hero's welcome".

In terms of inter-governmental relations, Tonga has generally avoided pressuring Fiji's "interim government" into holding democratic elections. However, Tongan Prime Minister Dr.Feleti Sevele has urged Bainimarama "to produce a credible roadmap to the election according to the Constitution and law of Fiji".

Tonga's "soft" approach to Fiji's unelected government during the regional meeting in October 2007 was in line with the approach chosen by other Pacific Island nations, but contrasted with the much harder stance adopted by Australia and New Zealand. The Tongan government rejected "several [...] attempts by New Zealand Prime Minister Helen Clark to lobby for Commodore Bainimarama's exclusion from the meeting".

In August 2008, Prime Minister of Tonga, Dr Sevele said at a Pacific Islands Forum meeting

Unfortunately, the Forum’s relationship with the interim government of Fiji has now deteriorated from the apparent, promising situation at the Forum last year in Tonga, to one of disappointment and of an uncertain future. As Forum Leaders, we are all extremely disappointed at the interim Prime Minister’s decision not to attend this Forum meeting. As Chair of last year’s Forum Meeting in Tonga and Chair of the last 12 months, let me place on record the fact that the commitments that Commodore Bainimarama made at the Leaders’ Retreat were not forced on him, as has been claimed.
He agreed with and accepted the 7-point communiqué on Fiji, and so told all the Leaders present at the Retreat. Sir Michael Somare and I certainly did not pressure him into making those commitments.
We, and all the Leaders were, and are, keen on helping Fiji move forward, but Fiji has to play its due part. The interim Prime Minister has an obligation to explain in person to the Forum Leaders as to why he could not fulfill those commitments, and we were all looking forward to his doing this at this Forum in Niue. That he chose not to do this is most unfortunate and most disappointing.

In May 2009, however, Sevele questioned the purpose of Fiji's suspension from the Forum (which had taken place on May 2) and suggested it was "pointless" to "ostracise" Fiji. TVNZ described Tonga's position as "a crack [...] in the hard line being taken against Fiji" by the Forum.

In February 2011, Sevele's successor, Lord Tuʻivakanō, stated that Australia and New Zealand's pressure on Fiji was counter-productive and that the more they "bother[ed]" Bainimarama, the more likely he might be to do the opposite of what they sought. He added: "Maybe just go easy and they will come around. What you need to remember is that it is an opportunity for other countries, maybe China will step in. [...] There's a lot of other countries looking in and Fiji's said 'We don't want Australia, we don't want New Zealand, these are the people that's going to help us.'"

=== Trade ===
In 2001, the Fijian Government banned the import of mutton flaps from Tonga. The Tongan Ministry of Labour said in response on this issue that "Tonga’s experience with Fiji is an example of the difficulties encountered by small developing nations in protecting their interests". The Tongan Ministry said this "illustrates the difficulty and huge onus that the multilateral trading system places on small and vulnerable developing countries, which lack the necessary resources, capital and institutional means to fully implement the WTO agreements."

=== Aviation ===
In August 2007, the Fijian Government called for a review of the Fiji/Tonga Air Services Agreement to allow for increased capacity on the route from 350 to 1000 passengers in each direction. By March 2008, a new aviation agreement had been reached. The Fijian Government said

This has been factored into the agreement reached by the two states in March 2008 to increase the seat capacity from 350 to 1000 per week with no restrictions to aircraft types or frequencies and both countries had agreed to this. This new provision will certainly assist or facilitate the movement of tourist between Tonga and Fiji.

=== 2010/2011: Minerva Reefs and Mara conflicts ===
Beginning in late 2010, and escalating in early 2011, diplomatic tensions opposed Fiji and Tonga over two partially simultaneous issues. Though they are presented separately here for clarity, they were being referred to simultaneously by May 2011.

==== Territorial disagreement ====
Both Fiji and Tonga lay claim to the Minerva Reefs, which lie between the two countries. Historically, the reefs are said to have lain in the fishing grounds of the people of Ono-i-Lau, in Fiji. In 1972, Tonga annexed the reefs, which had not formally been claimed by any State, but Fiji has not recognised the annexation and has stated it considers the reefs to lie within its territory. In late 2010, Fiji responded to news that Tonga had begun construction of a lighthouse on one reef, by saying Fiji reserved the right to take any means necessary to preserve its territorial integrity.

In February 2011 the Fiji government said there was "no official dispute" between the two countries on the issue, but that officials from the two sides were discussing the matter of the reefs' ownership and usage. A Fiji government official added: "The government of Fiji reiterates its position, that as far as it’s concerned Minerva Reef is a reef. And as such it lies within the economic, exclusive economic zone of Fiji. And the government of Fiji reserves its right within its directory." Fiji Foreign Affairs Permanent Secretary Solo Mara clarified that there was no "conflict", but merely "overlapping claims" on the countries' maritime boundary, in the context of "claims for an extended continental shelf beyond the 200 mile Exclusive Economy Zone - as provided for under the UN Convention on the Law of the Sea". Officials from the two countries would hold discussions to determine their maritime boundary.

In late May 2011, during the tension over the Tevita Mara affair (see below), "Fiji navy vessels visited Minerva and ordered New Zealand bound yachts out of the lagoon. They then destroyed navigation beacons" which had been set up by Tonga. The Tongan government issued a statement in protest. Fiji’s Deputy Permanent Secretary of Foreign Affairs Sila Balawa subsequently told the Fiji Broadcasting Corporation that Tonga remained "one of Fiji’s closest friends", and that, although Fiji clearly owned the reef as it was located within the country’s exclusive economic zone, Fiji hoped the disagreement would be resolved through "peaceful dialogue".

In early June, two Tongan Navy ships were sent to the Reef to replace navigational beacons destroyed by the Fijians, and to reassert Tonga's claim to the territory. A Fijian Navy ship in the vicinity reportedly withdrew as the Tongans approached, leading New Zealand's One News to comment that a military conflict between the two countries had narrowly been averted. A press release from the Tongan government described Fiji's destruction of Tongan navigational beacons as "an act of vandalism" posing "real danger to international shipping", adding that Tonga and "the Fijian military junta" could and should resolve their territorial dispute "under International law for the settlement of disputes between civilized societies". Simultaneously The People's Daily, citing "Fiji intelligence sources", reported on June 13 that "three Fijian naval ships" were "on their way to Minerva Reef" to confront the two Tongan navy ships there.

==== "Extraction" of Tevita Mara ====
In May 2011, Lieutenant-Colonel Tevita Mara, a former Fiji army officer, who had just been charged with plotting an attempt to overthrow Bainimarama, fled Fiji by boat and was picked up by a Tongan patrol boat and taken to Tonga. The Tongan authorities issued a statement saying they had picked him up after responding to a distress signal, and that in Nuku'alofa "arrangements have been made for his accommodation by the royal household office in deference to his rank". Bainimarama issued a statement saying the Royal Tongan Navy ship had entered Fijian territorial waters without authorisation to carry out an "illegal extraction" of the wanted man; he added that his government took "strong exception to such breaches of Fiji's sovereignty". He announced he would issue a formal protest to Tongan Prime Minister Lord Tu'ivakano and would seek Mara's extradition back to Fiji to face charges. Tui'vakano replied that Tonga's independent judiciary would hear Fiji's case for extradition, without interference from the Tongan government, and added that Tonga had no wish to interfere in Fiji's domestic affairs.

ʻAkilisi Pohiva, leader of the Tongan opposition, described the entry of a Tongan Navy vessel into Fiji waters to pick up a fugitive as a clear breach of relations between the two countries, but added that it was justifiable on humanitarian grounds.

On May 21, four days after the first reports on the incident, the Tongan government issued a statement saying it had received no request for Mara's extradition, only a note from the Fijian authorities containing what it called "unsubstantiated assertions" and "a personal statement by the Prime Minister of the Republic of Fiji, Commodore Josaia Voreqe Bainimarama". Subsequently, having acknowledged receipt of an extradition request, the Tongan government indicated "it will have to go through the proper channels for legal advice before we can proceed any further"; the authorities would not interfere with the judicial process. In early June, however, the authorities granted Mara Tongan citizenship, along with a passport.

Radio Australia reported that relations between the two countries has "soured dramatically" as a result of the incident.

On June 10 as Tongan Navy vessels moved to occupy the Minerva Reef, an unsigned press statement on the website of the Fiji government denounced "the presence of the Tongan Navy boats within Fiji’s EEZ at Minerva Reef", the "issue of Tongan passport" to Mara and "the Tongan Government’s inaction on extradition papers", describing them as "a web of deceit, collusion and a complete lack of disregard [sic] of legal extradition processes". Blaming Australia and New Zealand, the statement said "the Tongans as seen with their presence at the Minerva Reef will be manipulated through offerings of gifts and aid to try and turn up the ante", adding: "As far as Fiji is concerned there is no Mara or Tonga/Fiji situation. It is a Rudd and McCully spreading their wings to save face situation", in reference to Australian and New Zealand Foreign Affairs Ministers Kevin Rudd and Murray McCully. Stuff described the statement as an "unprecedented attack" on New Zealand, Tonga and Australia, remarking: "The statement on the website is so completely out of kilter with previous Fiji Government statements that it raises questions over who now is in control in Suva."

In late June, the Tongan government formally informed the Fiji government that Tongan law made it impossible to extradite Mara.
