= Tu'i Pulotu =

The Tu'i Pulotu is believed to be the head of an ancient group that settled in Pulotu (Fiji) during the Lapita period (1500 BC to 500 BC). The Tuʻi Pulotu is believed to have originally come from the Fiji Islands and ruled the islands from late BC to 800 AD. Some anthropologists believe there is an association between Pulotu and Burotu, the term for the paradise underworld in the Fijian religion. This is because of the different pronunciations within Tonga, Samoa, and Fiji. Burotu in Fiji was the Burotukula (Spiritual island), which, according to Fiji's religion, is near Matuku in the Lau Islands.

== Theories of origin ==
The island of Pulotu is an island located in Fiji, north-west of Tongatapu. It is referred to in Tongan oral traditions as "the motherland" or "place of origin." It is there that some believed that Tongan culture and its people developed and evolved out of the ancient Austronesian/Lapita culture (c. 1600 BCE - c. 500 BCE) that migrated from the South East Asian islands through Taiwan, the Philippines, Malaysia, Indonesia, Papua New Guinea, Solomon Islands, New Caledonia, Vanuatu, Micronesia and Fiji in about 8000 BC.
