= Fiji–New Zealand relations =

- New Zealand: Fiji

Fiji–New Zealand relations refers to foreign relations between New Zealand and Fiji. Relations between these two Pacific countries were previously amicable, and New Zealand has long been a significant development aid partner and economic partner for Fiji.

== Relations after the 2006 coup ==
Relations were soured following a military coup in Fiji in December 2006, and the overthrowing of Prime Minister Laisenia Qarase's government by Commodore Frank Bainimarama, who replaced him as prime minister. Helen Clark's government in New Zealand was one of the leading voices in condemning the coup. New Zealand has placed sanctions in Fiji, reduced its aid, and had continuously demanded that Bainimarama allow a return to democracy. Bainimarama, in turn, has accused the New Zealand government of "bullying", and of ignoring his efforts in reforming his country and preparing it for democratic elections. He has asked New Zealand to "be more sensitive, to understand the fundamentals and dynamics of Fiji's situation and not to make conclusions in haste".

Bilateral relations sank to a new low in June 2007 when Fiji expelled New Zealand's High Commissioner Michael Green, allegedly for "interfering in Fiji's domestic affairs" a claim which the New Zealand government denied.

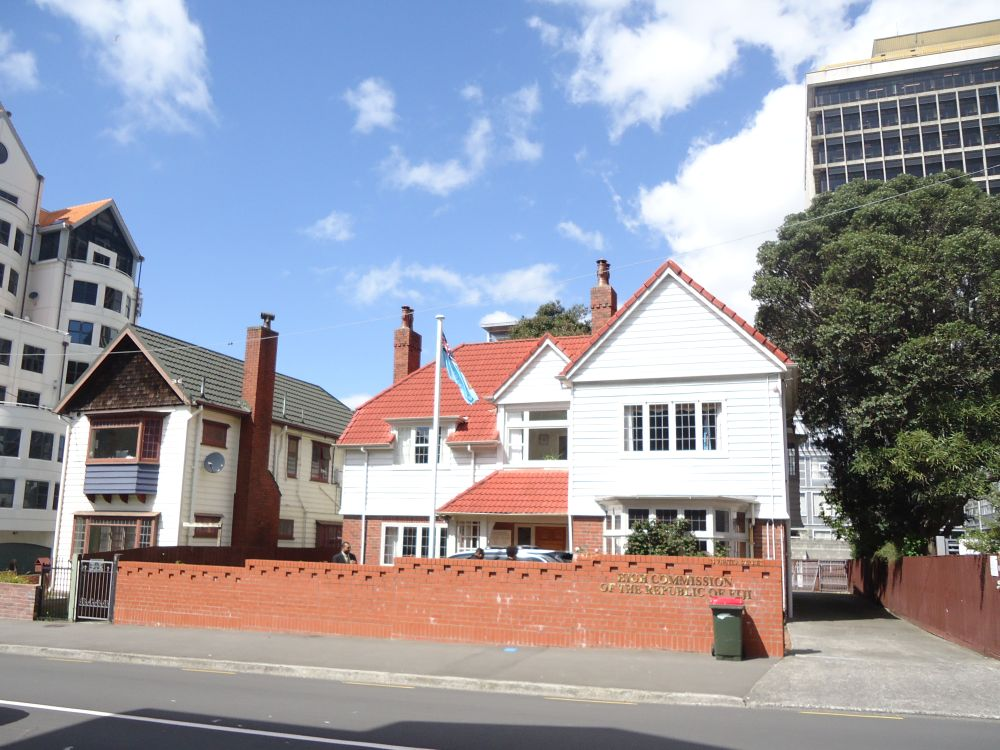
High Commission of Fiji in Wellington

The following month, Fiji's Finance Minister Mahendra Chaudhry accused New Zealand of being excessive in its hostility to Bainimara's government, and hinted at a shift in Fiji's foreign policy towards Asia: "Fiji has friends in China, it has friends in Korea, it has friends in […] other Asian countries. We’re no longer relying on Australia and New Zealand." Australia, like New Zealand, had strongly condemned the December 2006 coup, whereas China by contrast had advised the international community to show understanding towards the situation in Fiji.

Later that year, Helen Clark stated that Bainimarama would be "treated like a leper" if he attended a Pacific Islands Forum meeting in Tonga in October. Pacific Island nation members reacted by distancing themselves from New Zealand's stance, and Bainimarama did attend. Clark avoided Bainimarama at the meeting.

In November 2007, bilateral relations worsened further when a Fiji-born New Zealand businessman, Ballu Khan, was arrested in Fiji, accused of conspiring to assassinate Bainimarama and several other members of Fiji's government, and allegedly subjected to a severe beating by the police, which resulted in hospitalisation. New Zealand's High Commission in Suva was denied access to Khan. Fiji's Police Commissioner, Esala Teleni, commented: "There are efforts being made to create an unfavourable environment, that may provide excuses to certain lurking nations to interfere in the affairs of Fiji" – a transparent reference to New Zealand. New Zealand Foreign Affairs Minister Winston Peters reacted to the claim by dismissing it as "unsubstantiated nonsense". Helen Clark likewise denied that New Zealand had played any part in any plot to assassinate Bainimarama: "[F]rom New Zealand's point of view, we have no part in financing or supporting any activities of such kind in Fiji." Bainimarama published a statement confirming that he did not believe the Australian and New Zealand governments had been involved in the plot.

In December 2007, as part of sanctions, New Zealand controversially banned forty-seven Fijian children, aged 10 to 13, from entering New Zealand to participate in an international scouting event. New Zealand's highly strained bilateral relations with Fiji attracted international comment when they led the two countries to a dispute over football. New Zealand was due to host a 2010 World Cup qualifying match between Fiji and New Zealand, but denied entry to the Fiji team's main goalkeeper, Simione Tamanisau, due to the latter's fiancée's father being a member of the Fijian military.

In June 2008, Bainimarama stated that New Zealand and Australia were not genuinely trying to "move Fiji forward"; he described their pressure and demands as "insincere, hypocritical, unconstructive and obstructionist". He also stated that New Zealand and Australia "are condescending, hold neo-colonialist views and fail to recognise that Fiji is a sovereign state which needs to be treated with dignity and respect". Bainimarama added that "Australia and New Zealand are bent on sabotaging the efforts of the interim Government in building strong and accountable institutions" for Fiji.

Clark has said New Zealand will ease sanctions in Fiji once progress towards democracy becomes apparent. ("We need to see a roadmap. We need to see benchmarks met.") Bainimarama has argued that such progress is already apparent. ("What else do they want? People come up and tell me you have to show us concrete steps – what further steps?") Clark has said New Zealand will help fund Fiji's election, when it takes place.

In July 2008, Winston Peters met Bainimarama for the first time since the coup, in Fiji. The commodore raised the issue of New Zealand's sanctions, and Peters reaffirmed that sanctions would remain until the New Zealand government saw clear signs of an election being prepared. Later that month, Clark accused Bainimarama of being "guilty of rather serious crimes, such as treason". In September, she added that there would be no normalisation of New Zealand-Fiji relations until an elected government was back in power.

On 15 December 2008, the New Zealand Government now under the leadership of John Key defied an ultimatum by Bainimarama threatening to expel New Zealand's acting high commissioner unless a visa is granted to the son, a Massey University student who is the son of Rupeni Nacewa, a secretary in the office of Fiji's president in Suva.

On the same day, a TVNZ journalist (Barbara Dreaver) was detained at Nadi International Airport and taken to a Fiji detention centre overnight before she was deported back to New Zealand on the morning of the 16th. The reporter was allowed to keep her cellphone but was refused drinking water. Prime Minister John Key says the treatment of the journalist was "unacceptable". Also, Ministry of Foreign Affairs and Trade officials went to the detention centre to visit the journalist but were also denied entry, John Key stated that: "That is totally unacceptable and we will be taking that matter up with the Fijian authorities,".

On 23 December 2008, Fiji followed through on its threat to expel New Zealand's high commissioner to the island nation, the expulsion came a day after the interim Prime Minister of Fiji announced he would not expel New Zealand's top diplomat because he wanted to improve his relationship with New Zealand. In retaliation to the expulsion, New Zealand declared Fiji's High Commissioner in Wellington persona non-grata, John Key already stating that there would be retaliatory action if its commissioner was expelled. Reciprocal diplomatic expulsions (initiated by Fiji) occurred once again in November 2009.

In January 2010, New Zealand Foreign Minister Murray McCully met Fiji Foreign Minister Ratu Inoke Kubuabla in Nadi, and indicated that the two countries wished to improve their relations. The New Zealand government issued a press release stating that the two governments "agreed to an additional Counsellor position being established for Fiji in Wellington, and for New Zealand in Suva, with approval in principle for Deputy Head of Mission appointments in each capital to follow soon". New Zealand also specified that "the dialogue did not signal a change in Wellington's strong opposition to Fiji's military-led administration nor would sanctions be eased as a result".

On 10 June 2011, as Royal Tongan Navy vessels moved to occupy the disputed Minerva Reef between Fiji and Tonga, an unsigned press statement on the website of the Fijian government denounced "a web of deceit [and] collusion" involving Australia and New Zealand. The statement said "the Tongans as seen with their presence at the Minerva Reef will be manipulated through offerings of gifts and aid to try and turn up the ante", adding: "As far as Fiji is concerned there is no Mara or Tonga/Fiji situation. It is a Rudd and McCully spreading their wings to save face situation", in reference to Australian and New Zealand Foreign Affairs Ministers Kevin Rudd and Murray McCully. It accused McCully and Rudd of being "driven by [a] neo-colonial and personal agenda", and denounced "a concerted effort by the Australian Government in the form of Kevin Rudd/Stephen Smith followed by McCully on their coattails to subvert the path towards the holding of truly democratic elections in Fiji". Stuff.co.nz described the statement as an "unprecedented attack" on New Zealand, remarking: "The statement on the website is so completely out of kilter with previous Fiji Government statements that it raises questions over who now is in control in Suva."

== Since 2014 ==
Fiji and New Zealand have restored warm relations now that Sitiveni Rabuka has replaced Frank Bainimarama as Prime Minister of Fiji.

== See also ==
- Foreign relations of Fiji
- Foreign relations of New Zealand
