= History of the Jews in Fiji =

Fijian Jews Jiu ni Viti יהודי פיג'י
Total population
- 60

Regions with significant populations
- Suva

Languages
- English, Hebrew, Fijian, Fiji Hindi

Religion
- Judaism

The history of the Jews in Fiji is intertwined with the settlement of the Fiji islands by European explorers and settlers. Most of these settlers arrived in Fiji via Australia and New Zealand.

The population of Fiji is 905,949 (July 2006 estimate) with approximately 60 Jews. In addition, there are close to 300 people of Jewish descent living in the Fiji Islands, principally in the capital city of Suva. There are currently three cemeteries in Fiji, located in Momi (private cemetery), Ovalau Island (Levuka), and Suva (old cemetery) with Jewish inscriptions on the tombstones, dating back to the first Jewish settlers in the 19th century.

== History ==
=== 19th century ===
One of the early settlers was a merchant by the name Alexander Schmerrill Bowman (Hebrew name Alexander ben Shmuel) who was born on 9 Jan 1847 in Schneidemuhle, Prussia, (modern-day Pila in Poland) and died 1909 in Sydney, New South Wales, Australia. Bowman was of the firm Bowman and Abrahams of Levuka and Lomaloma. When he settled in Levuka, the former Capital of Fiji, he married Sara Annette Solomon on 25 July 1877 in Levuka, Fiji. She was the daughter of Phillip Solomon and Catherine Cohen. She was born 27 September 1857 in Auckland, New Zealand, and died 1915 in Sydney.

Another well-known figure was 20-year-old Henry Marks who arrived in 1881 from Australia. Marks laid the foundation of what became one of the most extensive commercial enterprises in the Western Pacific.

=== 21st century ===
Until the recent establishment of the Fiji Jewish Association there was little organized activity among the Jewish population. There remains limited religious life among these Jews. The Israeli Embassy holds an annual Passover Seder, which accommodates 50 to 60 people. Kosher food is imported from Australia.

Israel and Fiji enjoy full diplomatic relations. In May 2002, the then Fiji Prime Minister, Laisenia Qarase, himself of partial Jewish ancestry, agreed with the Israeli Ambassador, H. E. Ruth Kahanoff that the two countries should strengthen their ties though they are so far apart geographically. While there is an Israeli Embassy in Fiji, the Israeli Ambassador in Canberra, Australia represents Israeli interests in Fiji.

== See also ==
- List of Oceanian Jews
- History of the Jews in Australia
- History of the Jews in New Zealand
- Fiji-Israel Relations
