= Ministry of Foreign Affairs and International Cooperation (Fiji) =

Government ministry of Fiji

Coordinates: 18.153855°S 178.423439°E

Republic of Fiji Ministry of Foreign Affairs & International Cooperation
- Coat of arms of Fiji

Agency overview
- Jurisdiction: Republic of Fiji
- Headquarters: 87 Queen Elizabeth Drive, Suva
- Minister responsible: Sitiveni Rabuka, Minister for Foreign Affairs & International Cooperation
- Website: foreignaffairs.gov.fj

The Ministry of Foreign Affairs & International Cooperation is the ministry responsible for handling the Republic of Fiji's external relations. The ministry's current director is the Minister of Foreign Affairs and International Cooperation, Sitiveni Rabuka, who took the position in December 2022.

The ministry states that its objective is "the provision of policy advice to the Government [of Fiji] regarding the formulation and implementation of its foreign policies," and it maintains the country's various diplomatic missions based domestically in Suva, those attributed to Fiji in Canberra, Australia, and Wellington, New Zealand, as well as those based internationally.

== See also ==
- Foreign relations of Fiji
- List of diplomatic missions of Fiji
