= Fiji–Mexico relations =

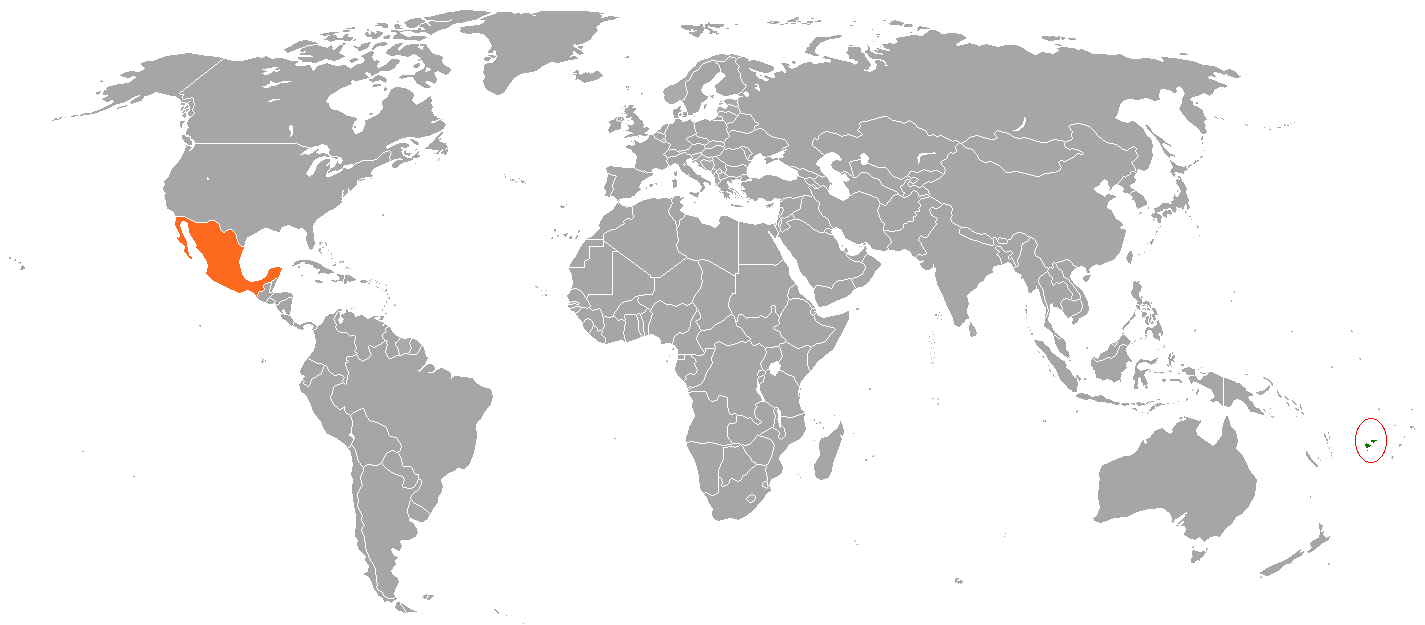

- Fiji: Mexico

The nations of Fiji and Mexico established diplomatic relations in 1975. Both nations are members of the United Nations.

== History ==
Fiji and Mexico established diplomatic relations on 31 August 1975. Mexico soon accredited its embassy in Canberra, Australia to Fiji. Relations between Fiji and Mexico have been limited, taking place primarily in multilateral forums such as at the United Nations.

In April 2014, Fijian Foreign Minister Inoke Kubuabola paid a visit to Mexico to attend the first Global Partnership for Effective Development Co-operation (GPEDC) summit in Mexico City. In January 2017, a group of 17 Mexican Senators, led by Senator Manuel Cavazos Lerma, attended the 25th Asia Pacific Parliamentary Forum held in Suva, Fiji.

In 2023, both nations celebrated 48 years of diplomatic relations.

== High-level visits ==
High-level visits from Fiji to Mexico

- Foreign Minister Inoke Kubuabola (2014)

High-level visits from Mexico to Fiji

- Senator Manuel Cavazos Lerma (2017)

== Trade ==
In 2023, trade between Fiji and Mexico totaled US$7.9 million. Fiji's main exports to Mexico include: drinking water (Fiji Water); fish and caviar, wood, and discs and tapes for media sound recording. Mexico's main exports to Fiji include: knives, razors and blades; stoves, grates and cookers; perfumery, soap, telephones and mobile phones, and air pumps.

== Diplomatic missions ==
- Fiji is accredited to Mexico from its embassy in Washington, D.C., United States.
- Mexico is accredited to Fiji from its embassy in Canberra, Australia and maintains an honorary consulate in Suva.
