= Samisoni =

Samisoni is a given name and surname. Notable people with the name include:

- Samisoni Fisilau (born 1987), Tongan Rugby Union player
- Samisoni Fonomanu Tu'i'afitu (1933–2005), Tongan nobleman
- Samisoni Langi (born 1993), Australian Rugby League player
- Samisoni Tikoinasau, Fijian politician
- Samisoni Viriviri (born 1988), Fijian Rugby Union player
- Jimione Samisoni (died 2007), Fijian medical doctor, husband of Mere Samisoni
- Mere Samisoni, Fijian business person and politician
