= List of Fijian ministries =

The Fijian Government exercises the executive functions and powers within the Republic of Fiji. This article lists spans of government ministries under a prime minister. The distinctive periods of these ministries consist of post-independence, post-2000 Coup d'état, and post 2006 Coup d'état .

== Ministries ==
Start date	Finish date	Head of state	Head of government	Governing party	Cabinet
10 October 1970	13 April 1987	Robert Sidney Foster	Kamisese Mara	Alliance Party	First Mara Ministry
13 April 1987	14 May 1987	Penaia Ganilau	Timoci Bavadra	Labour Party	Bavadra Ministry
5 December 1987	2 June 1992	Penaia Ganilau	Kamisese Mara	Independent	Second Mara Ministry
2 June 1992	19 May 1999	Penaia Ganilau	Kamisese Mara	Independent	Second Mara Ministry
2 June 1992	19 May 1999	Kamisese Mara	Sitiveni Rabuka	Fiji Political Party	Rabuka Ministry
19 May 1999	27 May 2000	Kamisese Mara	Mahendra Chaudhry	Labour Party	Chaudhry Ministry
27 May 2000	27 May 2000	Frank Bainimarama	Tevita Momoedonu	Labour Party	First Momoedonu Ministry
4 July 2000	14 March 2001	Josefa Iloilo	Laisenia Qarase	United Fiji Party	First Qarase Ministry
14 March 2001	16 March 2001	Josefa Iloilo	Tevita Momoedonu	Labour Party	Second Momoedonu Ministry
16 March 2001	5 December 2006	Josefa Iloilo	Laisenia Qarase	United Fiji Party	Second Qarase Ministry
5 December 2006	4 January 2007	Frank Bainimarama	Jona Senilagakali	Independent	Senilagakali Ministry
5 January 2007	22 September 2014	Josefa Iloilo; Epeli Nailatikau	Frank Bainimarama	FijiFirst	First Bainimarama Ministry
22 September 2014	24 December 2022	Epeli Nailatikau; Jioji Konrote; Wiliame Katonivere	Frank Bainimarama	FijiFirst	Second Bainimarama Ministry
24 December 2022	present	Wiliame Katonivere	Sitiveni Rabuka	People's Alliance Party	Second Rabuka Ministry

== See also ==
- Cabinet of Fiji
