= Tu'uakitau Cokanauto =

Fijian politician (1945–2023)

Ratu Cokanauto Tu'uakitau
- Born: 5 June 1947
- Died: 13 September 2023 (aged 76)
- Occupations: Fijian chief and politician
- Parent: Edward Cakobau (father)

Ratu Cokanauto Tu'uakitau (5 June 1947 – 13 September 2023) was a Fijian chief and politician. He was the scion of a distinguished family, as a son of Ratu Sir Edward Cakobau (a former Deputy Prime Minister and one of modern Fiji's founding fathers), and brother of Ratu Epeli Nailatikau, who had served as President of Fiji from 2009 to 2015.

== The 1999 election and aftermath ==
In the parliamentary election of 1999, Cokanauto, a candidate of the Fijian Association Party (FAP), won the Tailevu North Ovalau Open constituency on a recount, having failed to win on the initial count by a mere two votes. Although the FAP was part of the victorious People's Coalition, Cokanauto was not included in the new Cabinet announced by Prime Minister Mahendra Chaudhry. Following disagreements over the party's nominations to the Senate and the style of leadership, Cokanauto challenged Deputy Prime Minister and Fijian Affairs Minister Adi Kuini Speed for the leadership of the party on 11 September 1999. He initially ousted her, but the High Court subsequently ruled in Speed's favour. A vote to resolve the impasse narrowly confirmed Speed as leader, and Cokanauto and his supporters moved to the Opposition benches in January 2000, forming a breakaway faction of the FAP.

== The interim government (2000–2001) and the 2001 election ==
Following the failure of the coup, Cokanauto was appointed on 19 July 2000 to the Cabinet of interim Prime Minister Laisenia Qarase as Minister for Local Government, Housing and Environment. His brother, Ratu Epeli Nailatikau, was Deputy Prime Minister and Minister for Fijian Affairs in the same government.

In the general election held to restore democracy in September 2001, Cokanauto stood as an independent candidate. He was defeated by Josefa Vosanibola, the candidate of Qarase's party, the Soqosoqo Duavata ni Lewenivanua.

== Later developments ==
As of June 2005, Cokanauto was serving as a director of the Native Land Trust Board, which administered the 83 percent of the land that was communally owned by indigenous Fijians.

== Death ==
Tu'uakitau Cokanauto died on 13 September 2023, at the age of 76.
