= Mere Samisoni =

Fijian businesswoman and politician (1938–2023)

Dr Mere Samisoni
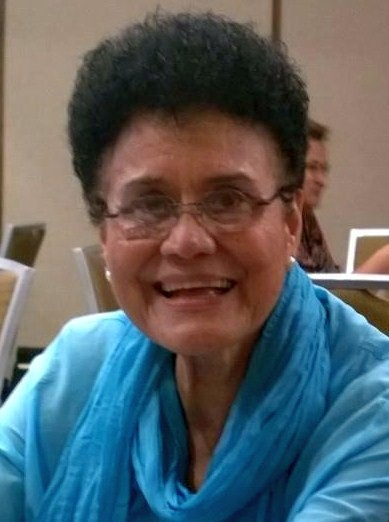

Member of Parliament
- In office March 6, 2018 – August 11, 2023
- President: Jioji Konrote; Wiliame Katonivere
- Prime Minister: Frank Bainimarama

Member of the House of Representatives
- In office June 6, 2006 – December 5, 2006
- President: Josefa Iloilo
- Prime Minister: Laisenia Qarase
- Preceded by: Kaliopate Tavola
- Succeeded by: Position abolished.
- Constituency: Lami (Open Constituency, Fiji)

Mayor of Lami
- In office November 1997 – October 1998
- Preceded by: Greg Yee
- Succeeded by: Michael Columbus

Personal details
- Born: February 7, 1938 Lami, Fiji
- Died: August 11, 2023 (aged 85)
- Other political affiliations: Soqosoqo ni Vakavulewa ni Taukei (1997- 1999); Soqosoqo Duavata ni Lewenivanua (2001 - 2006); Social Democratic Liberal Party (2013 - Death)
- Spouse: Jimione Samisoni
- Children: John Leslie Samisoni; Vanessa Charters; Selina Samisoni Hodge Duff; Philip Samisoni
- Education: University of New South Wales (MBA), University of the Sunshine Coast (PhD)

Adi Mere Tuisalalo Samisoni (28 July 1938 – 11 August 2023) was a Fijian businesswoman and politician, from Lomaloma village on the island of Vanua Balavu in Fiji's Lau archipelago. Samisoni was formerly a member of Parliament for the opposition party SODELPA. She served as mayor of Lami and as a member of the now-defunct House of Representatives.

== Politics ==
In March 2018, Samisoni was sworn in as the newest opposition member of Parliament under the Social Democratic Liberal Party (SODELPA), succeeding the late Ratu Sela Nanovo. During the 2014 elections, Samisoni polled 1855 votes. Samisoni won the Lami Open Constituency for the ruling Soqosoqo Duavata ni Lewenivanua Party (SDL) at the parliamentary election held on 6–13 May 2006. It was her third attempt to win the seat; her previous campaigns in 1999 and 2001 for the SVT Party had been unsuccessful.

== Later history ==
In the wake of the military coup that overthrew the government on 5 December 2006, Samisoni, Daily Post General Manager Mesake Koroi, and others, were detained by soldiers for questioning at Suva's Queen Elizabeth Barracks. No reason was given for the questioning, but Samisoni had written a letter unsympathetic to the military to the Fiji Times earlier in the week. In a letter to the Fiji Sun published on 15 December, Samisoni claimed that soldiers had told her that if she did not discontinue writing letters critical of the military regime to newspapers, she would be imprisoned on Nukulau Island.

In April 2009, Samisoni was awarded a Doctorate of Business Administration by the University of the Sunshine Coast.

In 2013, Samisoni's case was in the news again, when the Fiji government hired criminal attorney Clive Grossman to argue a jurisdictional matter related to the charges against Samisoni. Samisoni was represented by prominent human rights barrister, Sir Peter Williams QC and later by his widow, Lady Heeni Phillips, who won the case. The case was closed in 2016 in a voir dire hearing when the state voluntarily dropped its case

== Personal life and death ==
Samisoni was the second youngest daughter of Ratu Keni Naulumatua, who held the title of Turaga na Rasau, and his first wife, Mere Tuisalalo Fonolahi. She held Doctorate and Master's degrees in Business Administration and resided in Suva Fiji's Capital. She was well known for establishing a successful chain of bakeries throughout Fiji called Hot Bread Kitchen, and was married to the late Jimione Isimeli Samisoni of Rotuma, a doctor, lecturer, and former dean of the Fiji School of Medicine who had a great influence in the medical fraternity in Fiji and the Pacific. Together they had four children.

Mere Samisoni died on 11 August 2023, at the age of 85.
