= Tailevu North (Fijian Communal Constituency, Fiji) =

Former electoral constituency in Fiji

Tailevu North Fijian Provincial Communal is a former electoral division of Fiji, one of 23 communal constituencies reserved for indigenous Fijians. Established by the 1997 Constitution, it came into being in 1999 and was used for the parliamentary elections of 1999, 2001, and 2006. (Of the remaining 48 seats, 23 were reserved for other ethnic communities and 25, called Open Constituencies, were elected by universal suffrage). The electorate covered northern areas of Tailevu Province.

The 2013 Constitution promulgated by the Military-backed interim government abolished all constituencies and established a form of proportional representation, with the entire country voting as a single electorate.

== Election results ==
In the following tables, the primary vote refers to first-preference votes cast. The final vote refers to the final tally after votes for low-polling candidates have been progressively redistributed to other candidates according to pre-arranged electoral agreements (see electoral fusion), which may be customized by the voters (see instant run-off voting).

=== 1999 ===
Candidate	Political party	Votes (primary)	%	Votes (final)	%
Savenaca Tokainavo	Soqosoqo ni Vakavulewa ni Taukei (SVT)	1,494	20.06	3,995	...
Josefa Seruilagilagi	Fijian Association Party (FAP)	3,398	45.62	3,454	46.37
Iliesa Duvuloco	Nationalist Vanua Tako Lavo Party (NVTLP)	1,814	24.35	...	...
Ifereimi Ravoka	Christian Democratic Alliance (VLV)	743	9.97	...	...
Total		7,449	100.00	7,449	100.00

=== 2001 ===
Candidate	Political party	Votes (primary)	%	Votes (final)	%
George Speight [1]	Conservative Alliance (CAMV)	3,232	47.59	3,489	51.38
Simione Naiduki	Soqosoqo Duavata ni Lewenivanua (SDL)	2,415	35.56	2,445	36.00
Serupepeli Naqase	Independent	459	6.76	499	7.34
Sitiveni Kaila Tuvou	New Labour Unity Party (NLUP)	345	5.08	358	5.27
Joeli Baledrokadroka	Soqosoqo ni Vakavulewa ni Taukei (SVT)	340	5.01	...	...
Total		6,791	100.00	6,791	100.00
[1] Note that George Speight was elected under his Fijian name, Ilikimi Naitini.

=== 2006 ===
Candidate	Political party	Votes	%
Samisoni Tikoinasau	Soqosoqo Duavata ni Lewenivanua (SDL)	6,281	80.90
Iliesa Duvuloco	Nationalist Vanua Tako Lavo Party (NVTLP)	1,171	15.08
Laisiasa Cabenalevu	Fiji Labour Party (FLP)	312	4.02
Total		7,764	100.00

== Sources ==
- Psephos - Adam Carr's electoral archive
- Fiji Facts
