= Aalisha Sahukhan =

Fijian physician

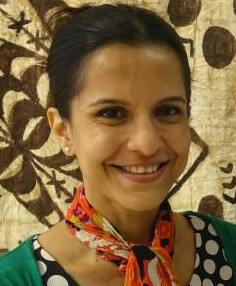
Sahukhan in 2015

Aalisha Sahukhan (or Sahu Khan) is a Fijian medical doctor. She is head of Health Protection at the Ministry of Health and Medical Services in Fiji. She has been prominent in the country's battle against COVID-19 and an earlier measles epidemic. She was nominated as one of "10 Outstanding Fijians in 2020" by the Fiji Sun newspaper.

== Early life ==
Sahukhan is the eldest daughter of Imtiaz Sahukhan, a dentist, and Ashla Singh, and is one of four siblings. She attended the International School in Suva. She then studied at the Fiji School of Medicine. In 2011, she started work as an intern in Fiji's medical system. Sahukhan is married to Amrish Krishnan, a nephrologist. They have two children.

== Career ==
After four years in the medical profession, Sahukhan won a Fulbright scholarship to study at the Rollins School of Public Health at Emory University in Atlanta, Georgia in the United States, where she qualified as a Master of Public Health with a thesis entitled Priority Diseases for Early Warning Alert and Response Networks (EWARN) 1997–2016. She also obtained a certificate on complex humanitarian emergencies. Returning to Fiji in 2017 she was appointed acting national advisor on communicable diseases. In 2018, she became acting head of Health Protection before being appointed head in 2021. Health Protection was a newly formed national programme bringing together the departments of environmental health, health emergencies and climate change, and communicable disease. Following the arrival of COVID-19 in Fiji, Sahukhan made frequent appearances on Fijian television.

Since 2022, Sahukan has served on the Technical Advisory Panel of the joint World Bank/World Health Organization Pandemic Fund.
