= Mitieli Bulanauca =

Fijian politician

Member of the Senate of Fiji
- In office 2001–2006

Minister for Lands and Mineral Resources
- In office 28 July 2000 – September 2001
- Prime Minister: Laisenia Qarase

Member of the Fijian Parliament for SODELPA List
- In office 14 November 2018 – 14 December 2022

Member of the Fijian Parliament for Bua
- In office 13 May 2006 – 4 December 2006
- Preceded by: Josateki Vula
- Succeeded by: None (Parliament disestablished)
- In office 15 May 1999 – September 2001
- Succeeded by: Josateki Vula

Personal details
- Party: Christian Democratic Alliance; Soqosoqo Duavata ni Lewenivanua; Social Democratic Liberal Party; People's Alliance

Mitieli Bulanauca (born 1951 or 1952) is a Fijian politician and former Cabinet Minister. He is currently a member of the People's Alliance.

He attended Lelean Memorial School before graduating from the University of New England, Australia. Before joining politics, Bulanauca worked for the Native Lands Trust Board as a senior lands manager.

He won the Bua Fijian Communal Constituency for the Christian Democratic Alliance (VLV) in the parliamentary election of 1999. In the political upheaval that followed the Fiji coup of 2000, Bulanauca was appointed to the interim Cabinet formed by Laisenia Qarase as Minister for Lands and Mineral Resources.

In the major political realignment that followed the 2000 coup, the VLV disintegrated. Bulanauca joined the newly formed Soqosoqo Duavata ni Lewenivanua Party (SDL), but lost his seat to the Conservative Alliance candidate, Josateki Vula. He was subsequently appointed to the Senate, however, as one of 9 nominees of the Prime Minister. In August 2002 while a senator he called for the abolition of Muslim public holidays, leading to calls for his removal from the Senate. In December 2002 he called for permanent i-Taukei government and for the constitution to be changed to make Fiji a christian nation. In July 2003 he called for Fiji to produce guns and Bibles for export.

In July 2004 during Vice-President Jope Seniloli's trial for treason during the 2000 Fijian coup d'état he was named as one of the members of coup leader George Speight's cabinet. He subsequently used his place in the Senate to call for the overthrow of the 1997 constitution, and to attack Fiji's police commissioner. In June 2005 he was granted immunity for coup-related offences in exchange for giving evidence against transport Minister Simione Kaitani.

He retired from the Senate in 2006 but at the general election held on 6–13 May that year, he was elected to represent his old constituency in the House of Representatives as the candidate of the SDL. He lost his seat when the Fijian parliament was overthrown by the 2006 Fijian coup d'état.

Bulanauca stood as a candidate for the Social Democratic Liberal Party at the 2018 elections, winning 3031 votes and a seat in parliament. In July 2020 he was investigated by the Fiji Independent Commission Against Corruption for his use of parliamentary allowances. In July 2020 he spread COVID-19 misinformation, claiming that the virus was created in China by Satanic Communists.

In November 2022, once Parliament had been dissolved for the election, Bulanauca resigned from SODELPA and joined the People's Alliance. He contested the 2022 election under the PA banner, but placed last on the party list with only 270 votes, and failed to gain a seat in Parliament.
