= Princess Margaret Hospital, Funafuti =

Princess Margaret Hospital

Geography
- Location: Funafuti atoll, Tuvalu
- Coordinates: 8°30′54.72″S 179°11′57.843″E

Organisation
- Type: General

Services
- Emergency department: Yes
- Beds: 50

History
- Founded: Hospital on Funafuti founded 1913; current site 2003.

Links
- Lists: Hospitals in Tuvalu

Princess Margaret Hospital (PMH) on Funafuti atoll in Tuvalu is the only hospital in the country, and the primary provider of medical services for all the islands of Tuvalu. The hospital is located about 1.3 kilometres north from the centre of Funafuti on Fongafale islet.

For 2010, the total health budget was AUD $4,696,042.

The hospital has 50 beds with separate wards for men, women and infants. It offers basic routine medical, surgical, obstetric and gynaecologic services. There is also an Intensive Care Unit (ICU), a surgery room and nurses' station. PMH also provides accident and emergency services.

Services to the outer islands of the country is provided by satellite clinics, staffed generally with a nurse and a midwife.

== History of health services ==
=== First hospital at Funafuti (1913) ===
The first hospital was established at Funafuti in 1913 at the direction of Geoffrey B. W. Smith-Rewse, during his tenure as the District Officer at Funafuti from 1909 to 1915. At this time Tuvalu was known as the Ellice Islands and was under the jurisdiction of the Western Pacific High Commission. In 1916 the Gilbert and Ellice Islands Colony was established. From 1916 to 1919 the hospital was under the supervision of Dr J. G. McNaughton, when he resigned the position remained vacant until 1930, when Dr D. C. Macpherson was appointed physician at the hospital. He remained in the position until 1933, when he was appointed to a position in Suva, Fiji.

During the colonial administration, Tuvaluans provided medical services at the hospital after receiving training at the Suva Medical School, which changed its name to Central Medical School in 1928 and which later became the Fiji School of Medicine. Training was provided to Tuvaluans who graduated with the title Native Medical Practitioners, nurses or "dressers", the male equivalent of nurses.

=== During World War II ===
During World War II the hospital on Fongafale islet was dismantled as the American forces built an airfield on this islet. The hospital was shifted to Funafala islet under the responsibility of Dr Ka, while Dr Simeona Peni provided medical services to the American forces at the 76-bed hospital that was built by the Americans at Vailele.

=== Post-War ===
After the war the hospital returned to Fogafale and used the American hospital until 1947 when a new hospital was built. However the hospital built in 1947 was incomplete because of problems in the supply of building materials. Cyclone Bebe struck Funafuti in late October 1972 and caused extensive damage to the hospital.

== Princess Margaret Hospital ==
In 1974 the Gilbert and Ellice Islands Colony was dissolved and the Colony of Tuvalu regained independence on 1 October 1978. A new 38-bed central hospital was built at Fakaifou on Fogafale atoll, with a New Zealand aid grant. It was completed in 1975 and officially opened on the 29 September 1978 by Princess Margaret after whom the hospital was named. The building now occupied by the Princess Margaret Hospital was completed in 2003 with construction of the building being funded by the Japanese Government.

== Medical Staff ==
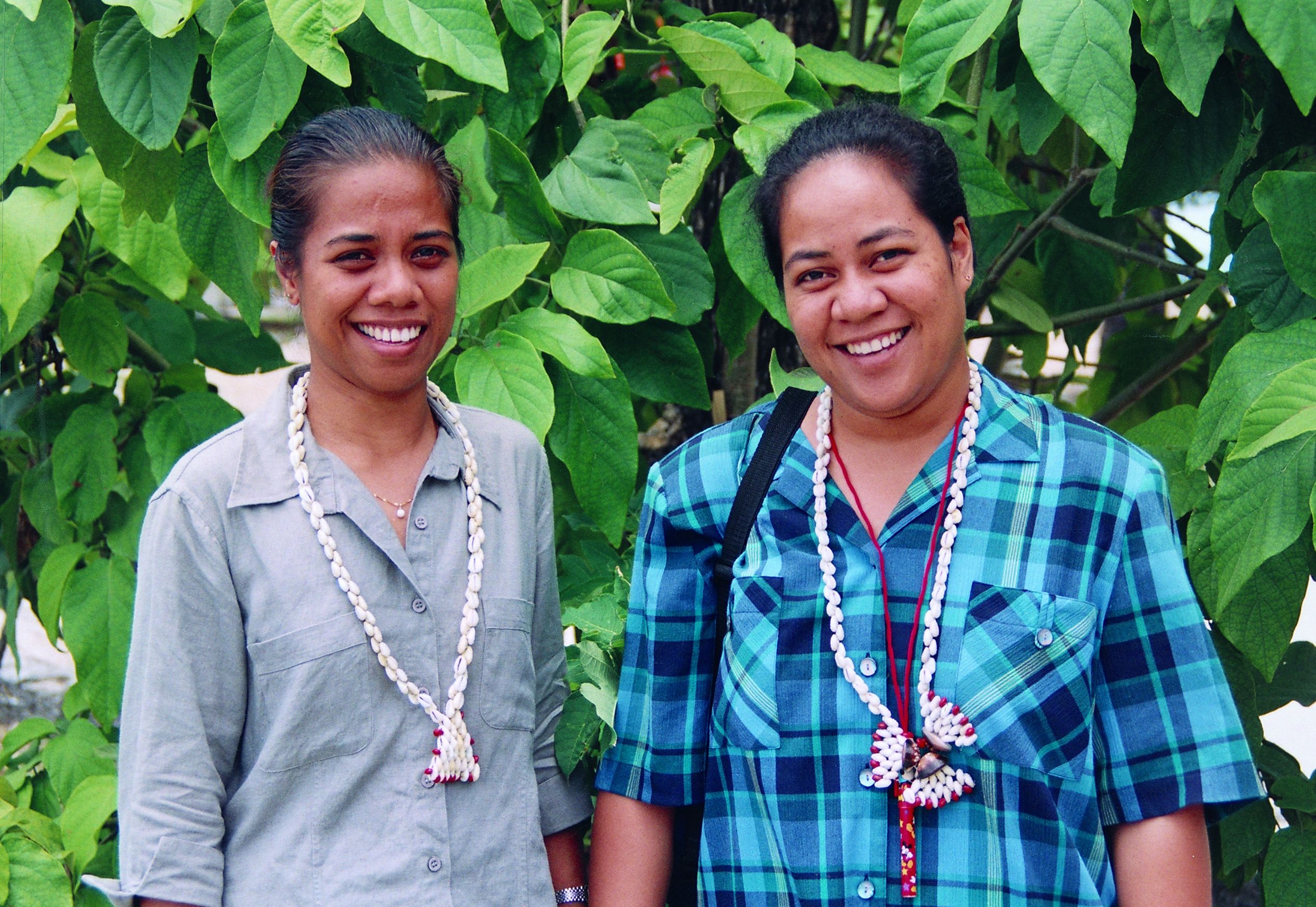
Tuvaluan doctors (2008) Dr Nese Ituaso-Conway (left) and Dr Miliama Simeona (right)

The Tuvaluan medical staff at PMH has been assisted by expatriate doctors from Philippines (Dr. Jun Oballo and Dr. Denniszon Mendoza), China, Germany, Russia and Myanmar whose services are provided through United Nation Volunteers (UNV) funding. The last UNV expatriate doctor worked in Tuvalu from 1997 to 2002. In 2008, at the Cuba-Pacific ministerial meeting, Cuba agreed to provide qualified medical doctors to work in Tuvalu and to provide medical education to Tuvalu students.

The Tuvaluan medical staff at PMH in 2010 & 2011 comprised the Director of Health & Surgeon, the Chief Medical Officer Public Health, an anaesthetist, a paediatric medical officer and an obstetrics and gynaecology medical officer. There were also four Cuban doctors working at the PMH. Allied health staff include 2 radiographers, 2 pharmacists, 3 laboratory technicians, 2 dieticians and 13 nurses with specialised training in fields including surgical nursing, anaesthesia nursing/ICU, paediatric nursing and midwifery. PMH also employs a dentist. The Department of Health also employ nine or ten nurses (including dressers) on the outer islands to provide general nursing and midwifery services.

As of 2016, the hospital is run by 8 medical officers, 20 nurses, 10 paramedical staff and 10 support staff. The other islands have a medical centre staffed by two nurses, a nurse assistant and two primary health care workers.

In 2019, the acting director of health is Suria Eusala Paufolau, the previous director of health was Dr. Nese Ituaso-Conway (MBBS (Fiji); MPH (UH, Hawaii)).

== Provision of referral and general health services ==
Since independence Tuvalu has had one hospital, the Princess Margaret Hospital (PMH), in Funafuti that provides referral and general health services to support the health clinics on each of Tuvalu's outer islands and for Tuvaluans living on Funafuti. Each Community Health Centre on the smaller outer islands is staffed by a midwife and general nurse. The Community Health Centre on Vaitupu, which has the second-largest population in Tuvalu (1,591 in the 2002 Census), is operated by a senior nurse, junior nurse, assistant nurse and a sanitation officer. Since 2008 the health infrastructure on the outer islands was improved with Community Health Centres, with facilities for inpatient care, being built at Vaitupu, Niutao and Nui with funding provided by the Japanese government's Grassroots program.

Patients are referred to PMH for basic surgery, such as peptic ulcers, appendicitis, hernias, removal of lesions and other minor procedures. Patients requiring more complex surgery are sent to the Colonial War Memorial Hospital in Suva, Fiji or to New Zealand under the NZ Medical Assistance Scheme, which is part of the Official Development Assistance (ODA) Programme administered by the NZ Ministry of Foreign Affairs and Trade. In 2010 there were a total of 18 patients sent for surgery, mainly to Fiji. Specialist eye and plastic surgeon teams from Australia and Taiwan also visit PMH.

The hospital provides outpatient services with outpatient numbers attending PMH falling dramatically from 58,847 in 1990 to 30,395 in 2000; and during this period the inpatient numbers at PMH dropped marginally from 898 to 820. Tuvalu's population to nurse ratio is low by regional standards at about 225:1 (at 2002).

== Health research and vaccination programs ==
The hospital has established a specialist department to study and manage climate change-related illnesses. The hospital records show an increase in illnesses that are attributed to the effects of climate change, including influenza, fungal diseases, conjunctivitis, dengue fever, and ciguatera poisoning that occurs when reef fish are eaten, when the fish have ingested micro-algaes that grow on coral.

In February 2024, the Tuvalu Department of Health launched a typhoid vaccination campaign that is funded by the Australian Department of Foreign Affairs and Trade (DFAT) and UNICEF. The vaccines will be administered to people between the ages of 9 months to 65 years.

== Management of COVID-19 ==
Tuvalu limited travel to Funafuti International Airport in early 2020. The government of Tuvalu put in place The COVID-19 (Threatened Emergency) Regulation 2021, then published the Standard Operating Procedure for International Travel to Tuvalu.

Dr Tapugao Falefou, was appointed the chair of the national Covid-19 taskforce. Tuvalu remained free of COVID-19 infections and implemented a vaccine program. By April 2022, 85% of 12-17-year-olds had received their first dose of vaccine, and about 90% of its adult population were fully vaccinated. In 2023, the IMF Article IV consultation with Tuvalu concluded that a successful vaccination strategy allowed Tuvalu to lift coronavirus disease (COVID-19) containment measures at the end of 2022.

== Surgical procedures ==
A total of 1084 surgical procedures were performed during the first 10 years of independence from 1978 to 1988. Visiting surgical teams performed 29% of these procedures. Fifty percent of the procedures related to obstetrical and gynaecological operations, eye surgery and abdominal operations with the most common operations being cataract extraction, tubal ligation and appendicectomy. During that period, only 12 patients were sent overseas for surgical treatment. An analysis of 254 surgical, obstetric and gynaecological procedures during the same period established that the postoperative mortality rate was 0.4 per cent and the morbidity rate was 13 per cent.

An analysis of 132 obstetric and gynecologic operations associated with complicated pregnancy and delivery during the period from 1988 to 1989 established that there were 38 cesarean sections, of which 76 percent were emergency operations. There was no maternal mortality. The complication rate was 13 percent and included two neonatal deaths. The cesarean birth rate during the study period was 7.6 percent.

== Government health policy ==
Te Kakeega II - the Tuvaluan national strategies for 2005-2015 (TK II) refers to the health priority of the “maintenance of PMH and outer island clinics, the latter especially for maternal and child health care."

Te Kakeega III - National Strategy for Sustainable Development 2016-2020 (TK III) sets out the development agenda of the Government of Tuvalu. TK III includes new strategic goals in relation to health policy, including medical infrastructure, medical human resources and providing resources to address issues at the intersection of climate change and health.

Te Kete - National Strategy for Sustainable Development 2021-2030. Health goals include: promoting primary health care services targeting the reduction of non-communicable diseases and as well as modifiable behavioural risk factors, such as tobacco use, physical inactivity, unhealthy diet and the harmful use of alcohol; foster strong nutritious dietary practices by eating local food; strengthen mental health care; and foster greater use of traditional medicine and healing.
