= Sam Speight =

- Full name: Samisoni Levulevu Speight
- Born: 3 October 1985 (age 41) Suva, Fiji
- Height: 5 ft 11 in (180 cm)
- Weight: 196 lb (89 kg)
- School: Suva Grammar School; Queen Victoria School
- Notable relative(s): Henry Speight (brother); George Speight (uncle)
- Occupation: British Army

Rugby union career
- Position: Wing
International career
Years	Team	Apps	(Points)
2013	Fiji	1	(0)

Samisoni Levulevu Speight (born 3 October 1985) is a Fijian former rugby union international. He is currently a Strength and Condition Coach of the Fijian Drua team.

== Biography ==
Born in Suva, Speight was educated at Suva Grammar School and Queen Victoria School. He is a grandson of former Fiji president Josefa Iloilo and son of former cabinet minister Samisoni Tikoinasau. George Speight, leader of the 2000 Fiji coup, is his uncle. He is the elder brother of Wallabies winger Henry Speight.

Speight was more lightly built than most Fijian wingers, but had considerable pace. He served with the British Army, which is where he played his rugby, before signing a contract in 2013 to play for Bristol.

While representing Combined Services in 2013, Speight scored a hat trick of tries against the Barbarians and two weeks later earned a Fiji call up to play the same opponents at Twickenham, which remained his only Test appearance.

== See also ==
- List of Fiji national rugby union players
