= Josaia =

Josaia is a given name. Notable people with the name include:

- Josaia Raisuqe (1994–2025), Fijian rugby union footballer
- Josaia Rayawa, Fijian chief, religious leader, and politician
- Josaia Tavaiqia (1931–1997), Fijian chief and politician
- Josaia Waqabaca, Fijian politician

== See also ==
- Josiah (given name)
