= Lelean Memorial School =

Fijian school

Coordinates: 18°2′11″S 178°31′36″E

- Nausori, Fiji

Information
- Type: Co-ed, boarding & day students, Methodist Church
- Motto: Seek Wisdom and Spiritual Understanding
- Established: 1942; 84 years ago
- Principal: Napolioni Silatolu
- Colors: Navy blue, royal blue, sky blue, white
- Nickname: Korodredre, Davuilevu Sukulu, Lelean Knights, Blues, Home of the Brave
- Website: Lelean Memorial School

Lelean Memorial School was established on March 3, 1943 and is run by the Methodist Church of Fiji and Rotuma. It is co-located at the Davuilevu Methodist Compound with the Davuilevu Theological College and the Young People's Department, which runs training for Methodist catechists. The school is named for Charles Oswald Lelean (d. 14 September 1942), who was a Methodist missionary in Fiji for 34 years.

== History ==
Davuilevu was the home station of Reverend Thomas Baker who was martyred and killed in 1867 by cannibals at Nubutautau in the upper reaches of the Navosa Hills. His famous words still ring true to those who enter Davuilevu. When warned of a possible plot against his missionary party, he replied in Fijian that "Sa yawa vei au ko Davuilevu, ka sa voleka vei au ko lomalagi," meaning, "Davuilevu is yet far, heaven for me is closer."

The Methodist Church moved its Theological College for Ministers and Bible School for Catechists from Navuloa to Davuilevu in 1907. Fiji's first technical and engineering school was also established here. Later the colonial government asked the assistance of the Methodist Church to help set up the government technical school. This was named the Derrick Technical Institute, after the founder and Principal of the Davuilevu Technical School, R.A. Derrick, and who was asked to set up the government technical school at Samabula, Suva. The Derrick Technical Institute was later renamed the Fiji Institute of Technology.

In 2017, 200 students in Year 9 were displaced when a fire destroyed five classrooms at the campus.

In 2022, Lelean had 1,200 students in 29 classrooms. In 2025, 1,500 of the school's cadets participated in a parade in Suva.

== Etymology ==
Davuilevu can be translated as "the large conch shell". The use of the adjective "large" in this context is used by the church to convey the significance of the duty bestowed upon church members who attend the Davuilevu institutions, which surpasses even its physical size. It is the premier institution of the Methodist Church in Fiji and Rotuma. Indigenous Fijians use the giant conch shell (Charonia tritonis) as a horn to herald important events such as the birth and death of a high ranking chief.

== Rugby ==
Lelean has won the coveted Deans Trophy for the FSSRU Under-19 competition 14 times, and has drawn five times since it entered the competition in the mid-1940s. Lelean last held the Deans Trophy in 2014. Their previous victory in the Fiji secondary schools' competition was in 2010, having also won it in 2009.

== Notable alumni ==
=== Government ===
- Pita Nacuva - former speaker of the House of Representatives
- Mitieli Bulanauca - former senator
- Sailosi Kepa - former high court judge and attorney general
- Pita Nacuva - former ambassador to USA and Canada
- Viliame Navoka - former consul general, Sydney, Australia
- Jjoji Kotobalavu - former ambassador to Japan, Permanent Secretary to the Prime Minister, later CEO, Prime Minister's Office
- Jone Usamate - Minister for Employment Opportunities, Productivity and Industrial Relations, Fiji First Government
- Semi Koroilavesau - Minister for Fisheries, Fiji First Government
- Timoci Lesikivatukoula Natuva - former Minister for Defence, Fiji First Government
- Sakiasi Ditoka - Minister for Rural and Maritime Development and Disaster Management

=== Sports ===
- Seremaia Bai
- Waisea Daveta
- Apisai Domolailai
- Ravai Fatiaki
- Saiasi Fuli
- Sailosi Kepa
- Iliesa Keresoni
- Tevita Kuridrani - Australia
- Fero Lasagavibau
- Eroni Mawi
- Pita Nacuva
- Napolioni Nalaga
- Sireli Naqelevuki
- Eparama Navale
- Akapusi Qera
- Alipate Ratini
- Joe Ravouvou
- Joe Rika
- Apolosi Satala
- Manasa Saulo
- Waisale Serevi
- Metuisela Talebula
- Dale Tonawai
- Suliasi Vunivalu - Melbourne Storm

=== Other ===
- Paula Niukula - 9th President of the Methodist Church of Fiji and Rotuma. First Fijian Principal of the Davuilevu Theological College. First Masters recipient of the University of the South Pacific. Founder of the Fiji Council of Churches Research Group which evolved into ECREA - Ecumenical Centre for Research, Education and Advocacy.
- Jimione Samisoni
- Apenisa Kurisaqila - former national health minister
