= Marieta Rigamoto =

Fijian politician

Minister for Information and Media Relations
- In office 12 July 2005 – 13 May 2006
- Prime Minister: Laisenia Qarase
- Preceded by: Ahmed Ali

Member of the Fijian Parliament for Rotuma Communal
- In office 15 May 1999 – 13 May 2006
- Preceded by: None (Constituency established)
- Succeeded by: Jioji Konrote

Personal details
- Born: 1941 or 1942 (age 83–84)

Marieta Rigamoto (born 1941 or 1942) is a former Fijian civil servant, politician and Cabinet Minister.

== Education and early career ==
Rigamoto was educated at Dudley High School, and subsequently graduated with a Diploma in Tropical Agriculture from the Fiji College of Agriculture in 1965, and with a Bachelor's degree in Science (BSc) from the University of Hawaiʻi in 1969. She later completed postgraduate work at the University of London in 1971.

She worked in the civil service from 1966 to 1998. Her assignments included the Ministry of Agriculture (1969–1982), and the Public Service Commission (1975–1976). She was Principal of the Fiji College of Agriculture from 1982 to 1989. Her last civil service appointment was in the Office of the President, from 1994. She retired from the civil service on 1 December 1998.

== Political career ==
She contested the 1999 Fijian general election as an independent, and was elected to the House of Representatives of Fiji after winning a tight competition for the Rotuman Communal Constituency. She was subsequently appointed Assistant Minister for Agriculture. During the 2000 Fijian coup d'état she was taken hostage by George Speight. After turning down an offer of freedom, she was eventually released on 24 June after 37 days in captivity. She was re-elected in the 2001 election and appointed Assistant Minister in the Prime Minister's Department. Following the death of Ahmed Ali she was appointed Minister for Information and Media Relations in July 2005. In September 2005 she was forced to apologise for contempt of court, after commenting on evidence during the trial of an agriculture ministry official over a multi-million dollar corruption scam.

In February 2006 she announced that she would not be contesting the 2006 election. Following her retirement she was named as one of a number of Ministers who has used farming assistance funding to buy votes during the 2001 election. Further allegations of her involvement were made at another trial in 2011. The investigation was ultimately discontinued in 2011.
