= Laisenia Qarase =

Prime Minister of Fiji from 2000 to 2006

The Right Honourable Laisenia Qarase

Prime Minister of Fiji
- In office 16 March 2001 – 5 December 2006
- President: Josefa Iloilo
- Deputy: Tupeni Baba; Epeli Nailatikau; Teimumu Kepa
- Preceded by: Tevita Momoedonu
- Succeeded by: Jona Senilagakali
- In office 4 July 2000 – 14 March 2001
- President: Ratu Josefa Iloilovatu Uluivuda
- Deputy: Epeli Nailatikau
- Preceded by: Vacant
- Succeeded by: Tevita Momoedonu

Member for Lau
- In office 2001–2006
- Preceded by: Koila Nailatikau
- Succeeded by: Office abolished

Personal details
- Born: 4 February 1941 Vanua Balavu, Colony of Fiji
- Died: 21 April 2020 (aged 79) Suva, Fiji
- Party: Soqosoqo Duavata ni Lewenivanua
- Spouse: Leba Qarase (?–2020; his death)
- Children: 5

Laisenia Qarase (pronounced [lai̯seni̯a ŋɡaˈrase]; 4 February 1941 – 21 April 2020) was a Fijian politician. He served as the sixth Prime Minister of Fiji from 2000 to 2006. After the military quashed the coup that led to the removal of Mahendra Chaudhry, Qarase joined the Interim Military Government as a financial adviser on 9 June 2000, until his appointment as Prime Minister on 4 July. He won two parliamentary elections, but a military coup removed him from power on 5 December 2006. He was later imprisoned on corruption charges brought by the military-backed regime.

A native of Vanua Balavu Island in the Lau archipelago, he was one of many Lauans to have held top leadership positions in Fiji.

== Early and personal life ==
Qarase was born in 1941 into the Tota clan in Mavana on Vanua Balavu, the son of Josateki Mate of Mavana village. After attending local schools, he enrolled at Suva Boys Grammar School. Following his education at Suva Boys Grammar School, Qarase left Fiji in 1959 and went on to graduate from New Zealand's University of Auckland with a degree in Commerce. He got his first job at the Fijian Affairs Board and served as a career civil servant at the ministries of Finance, Commerce and Industry and Public Service. He entered the banking profession and became the first ethnic Fijian managing director of the publicly owned Fiji Development Bank (FDB) in 1983, a position he held for fifteen years. After the 1987 coup, he was called in by the new government to help to rebuild the damaged economy. He introduced the nine-point plan which oversaw extended government assistance to Fijians and the creation of Fijian Holdings. However, the plan mostly resulted in bankruptcies and he was embroiled in a scandal in Fijian Holdings over the acquisition of shares by his family. In 1994, he became the chairman of Fiji Television and clashed with the government for not consulting him over its plans to introduce US investment into the company.

Qarase had Indigenous Fijian, Tongan, and Jewish ancestry. Qarase's mother is the daughter of John Herman Ma’afu Bowman, who had Jewish parents, Alexander Bowman and Sara Annette. He was married to Leba Qarase, with whom he had five children. Qarase was a chief in his native village of Mavana, on the island of Vanua Balavu, where he held the traditional chiefly title of Tui Kobuco.

== 2006 coup and aftermath ==
On the occasion of his 65th birthday on 4 February 2006, Qarase stated that if re-elected in the election that was duly held on 6–13 May, it would very likely be his last term in office. He won re-election, but continuing disagreements between his government and the powerful Republic of Fiji Military Forces culminated in a military coup on 5 December. Fiji Village reported the next day that he had been flown to his home island of Vanuabalavu by the military, while Radio New Zealand claimed that he had fled there. He told Radio New Zealand that he was "down but not out"; he intended to fight on, and called for a peaceful popular uprising. On the same day it was reported that he had asked for military assistance from Australia. The BBC reported that after being warned by Commodore Bainimarama not to "incite violence", Prime Minister Qarase planned to return to Suva, from which he was banished, but was warned that he faced arrest if he returned.

From Vanuabalavu, he remained outspoken in condemning the military takeover, comparing the new regime to those of Saddam Hussein, Adolf Hitler, and Idi Amin, in an interview quoted in the Fiji Times and Fiji Village on 13 and 14 December 2006.

On 2 February, Fiji Village quoted Qarase as having told Radio Australia that he was considering contesting the election to restore democracy, expected to be held within the next five years. Qarase called for the date to be brought forward.

On 6 September 2007, Bainimarama imposed a renewed state of emergency for one month, alleging that Qarase and his spokesman, Peceli Kinivuwai, were spreading lies and attempting to cause destabilization, following Qarase's return to Suva after having been confined to Vanuabalavu since his ousting. Bainimarama said that Qarase and his spokesman should return to Vanuabalavu and that they could "talk from there."

Qarase initiated a court challenge to the coup on 4 October 2007. Martial law was lifted on 6 October on the grounds that there was no threat.

Elections were tentatively set in February 2009 but did not occur until September 2014. Qarase was one of several politicians banned from running for office and his political party was forced to disband. It reorganised, but was forced to take a name in English, not Fijian (Social Democratic Liberal Party). It was later forced to change its initials to not match Qarase's former party, although its policy positions remained similar.

=== Financing allegations ===
In January 2010, it was reported that Qarase would stand trial on charges, brought by the Military-backed interim government, of abusing his office. Qarase was found guilty of abusing his office and failing to perform his duty, and sentenced on 3 August 2012 to one year in prison. His supporters say the charges were politically motivated.

== Cabinet ==
Ministers
Portfolio	Portrait	Minister	Constituency
Prime Minister; National Reconciliation		Laisenia Qarase	Lau
Deputy Prime Minister; Fijian Affairs		Epeli Nailatikau	None (Great Council of Chiefs)
Minister for Justice		Alipate Qetaki	None
Finance; National Planning		Jone Kubuabola	South West Urban
Foreign Affairs; External Trade; Sugar		Kaliopate Tavola	Lami
Commerce, Business Development and Investment		Tomasi Vuetilovoni	Ra
Tourism; Information		Jone Koroitamana	None
Minister for Public Enterprises and Public Sector Reform		Hector Hatch	None
Information; Communication		Inoke Kubuabola	None (Senate)
Labour; Industrial Relations		Tevita Momoedonu	Vuda
Home Affairs; Immigration		Talemo Ratakele	None (Senate)
Women; Culture; Social Welfare		Teimumu Kepa	Rewa
Education		Nelson Delailomaloma	None
Works and Energy		Joketani Cokanasiga	Serua
Youth; Employment Opportunities; Sports		Keni Dakuidreketi	None
Health		Pita Nacuva	Nadroga Navosa
Local Government; Housing; Environment		Tu'uakitau Cokanauto	Tailevu
Agriculture; Fisheries; Forests; ALTA		Apisai Tora	None
Regional Development; Multi-Ethnic Affairs		Inoke Takiveikata	None (Senate)
Lands and Mineral Resources		Mitieli Bulanauca	Bua

Assistant Ministers
Portfolio	Portrait	Minister	Constituency
Fijian Affairs		Suliano Matanitobua	Namosi
Fijian and Rotuman Affairs		Finau Tabakaucoro	None
Women; Culture; Social Welfare		Senimili Dyer	Tailevu South Lomaiviti
Women; Culture; Social Welfare		Bernadette Ganilau	None
Agriculture; Fisheries; Rotuma		Marieta Rigamoto	Rotuma
Education		Semi Seruvakula	None
Police		Kolinio Rokotuinaceva	None (Great Council of Chiefs)
Regional Development		George Shiu Raj	None

== Sources ==
- About the 2000 interim cabinet (French)
- Fijian parliamentary website

Political offices
Vacant	Prime Minister of Fiji; 2000–2001	Succeeded by Ratu Tevita Momoedonu
Preceded by Ratu Tevita Momoedonu	Prime Minister of Fiji; 2001–2006	Succeeded by Jona Senilagakali
