= Cavubati =

Cavubati is a surname. Notable people with the surname include:

- Bill Cavubati (born 1970), Fijian rugby union player
- Tevita Cavubati (born 1987), Fijian rugby union player
- Viliame Cavubati (born 1945), Fijian politician
