= Nadroga Navosa (Fijian Communal Constituency, Fiji) =

Former electoral constituency in Fiji

Nadroga Navosa Fijian Provincial Communal is a former electoral division of Fiji, one of 23 communal constituencies reserved for indigenous Fijians. Established by the 1997 Constitution, it came into being in 1999 and was used for the parliamentary elections of 1999, 2001, and 2006. (Of the remaining 48 seats, 23 were reserved for other ethnic communities and 25, called Open Constituencies, were elected by universal suffrage). The electorate was coextensive with Nadroga Navosa Province.

The 2013 Constitution promulgated by the Military-backed interim government abolished all constituencies and established a form of proportional representation, with the entire country voting as a single electorate.

== Election results ==
In the following tables, the primary vote refers to first-preference votes cast. The final vote refers to the final tally after votes for low-polling candidates have been progressively redistributed to other candidates according to pre-arranged electoral agreements (see electoral fusion), which may be customized by the voters (see instant run-off voting).

In the 2001 election, Pita Nacuva won with more than 50 percent of the primary vote; therefore, there was no redistribution of preferences.

=== 1999 ===
Candidate	Political party	Votes (primary)	%	Votes (final)	%
Leone Tuisowaqa	Fijian Association Party (FAP)	6,296	48.17	6,621	50.65
Seruwaia Raluvu Hong-Tiy	Soqosoqo ni Vakavulewa ni Taukei (SVT)	4,742	36.28	5,366	41.05
Atunaisa Mataitoga	Christian Democratic Alliance	1,054	8.06	1,084	8.29
Inoke Kedralevu	Independent	855	6.54	...	...
Mosese Naisaroi	(VMDP)	124	0.95	...	...
Total		13,071	100.00	13,071	100.00

=== 2001 ===
Candidate	Political party	Votes	%
Pita Kewa Nacuva	Soqosoqo Duavata ni Lewenivanua (SDL)	6,237	53.22
Leone Tuisowaqa	Fijian Association Party (FAP)	2,368	20.21
Sailosi Saucake	Fiji Labour Party (FLP)	1,516	12.94
Avakuki Sasaroko	Protector of Fiji (BKV)	1,070	9.13
Amete Ranadi Volavola	Conservative Alliance (CAMV)	528	4.51
Total		11,719	100.00

=== 2006 ===
Candidate	Political party	Votes	%
Ratu Isikeli Tasere	Soqosoqo Duavata ni Lewenivanua (SDL)	10,624	71.56
Veniana Gonewai	Fiji Labour Party (FLP)	2,527	17.02
Peniasi Kunatuba	Independent	1,167	7.86
Inoke Kadralevu	Party of National Unity (PANU)	356	2.40
Sakiusa Timoci Manumanunivalu	Nationalist Vanua Tako Lavo Party (NVTLP)	172	1.16
Total		14,8486	100.00

== Sources ==
- Psephos - Adam Carr's electoral archive
- Fiji Facts
