= Lau (Fijian Communal Constituency, Fiji) =

Former electoral constituency in Fiji

Lau Fijian Provincial Communal is a former electoral division of Fiji, one of 23 communal constituencies reserved for indigenous Fijians. Established by the 1997 Constitution, it came into being in 1999 and was used for the parliamentary elections of 1999, 2001, and 2006. (Of the remaining 48 seats, 23 were reserved for other ethnic communities and 25, called Open Constituencies, were elected by universal suffrage). The electorate covered the Lau Islands archipelago and was coextensive with Lau Province.

The 2013 Constitution promulgated by the Military-backed interim government abolished all constituencies and established a form of proportional representation, with the entire country voting as a single electorate.

== Election results ==
In the following tables, the primary vote refers to first-preference votes cast. The final vote refers to the final tally after votes for low-polling candidates have been progressively redistributed to other candidates according to pre-arranged electoral agreements (see electoral fusion), which may be customized by the voters (see instant run-off voting).

=== 1999 ===
Candidate	Party	Votes	%
Koila Nailatikau	VLV	3,012	50.82
Viliame Cavubati	SVT	2,816	47.51
Isoa Tuinasaqalau	NVTLP	99	1.67
Total		5,927	100.00
Registered voters/turnout		5,927	–
VLV win			

=== 2001 ===
Candidate	Party	Votes	%
Laisenia Qarase	SDL	5,219	91.48
Vakatoto Biu Vulivakarua	SVT	246	4.31
Sailosi Halofaki	Independent	164	2.87
Bogivitu Lotawa	CAMV	76	1.33
Total		5,705	100.00
Registered voters/turnout		5,705	–
SDL gain from VLV			

=== 2006 ===
Candidate	Party	Votes	%
Laisenia Qarase	SDL	4,896	93.33
Viliame Cavubati	NAP	350	6.67
Total		5,246	100.00
Registered voters/turnout		5,246	–
SDL hold			

== Sources ==
- Psephos - Adam Carr's electoral archive
- Fiji Facts
