= Josaia Rayawa =

Fijian chief and politician

Ratu Josaia Naulumatua Rayawa is a Fijian Chief, religious minister and political leader. He served in the Senate from 2001 to 2006 as one of nine nominees of the Fijian Prime Minister, Laisenia Qarase. He had previously been President of the now-defunct Christian Democratic Alliance (VLV), which won three seats in the 1999 election.

Rayawa was born in Nabudrau, Noco, in Rewa Province on 28 December 1931. He currently holds the title of Tui Noco and is one of the district chiefs in the province of Rewa. Educated in the United States, he holds a Bachelor of Arts degree in Religious Education and a Master of Arts degree in Theology from AOG Theological Graduate School in Springfield, Missouri.

Ordained as an Assemblies of God minister in 1967, Rayawa has been active in community and religious works in various nations of the South Pacific, including Fiji. He has worked and pastored in Lautoka (1960-1966); Beqa (1966); Levuka (1967); Labasa (1968-1973), the Solomon Islands (1971, as a missionary), Dreketi(1968-1972), and Caubati (1974-1977). During this time, he worked as senior lecturer at the South Pacific Bible College in Wainadoi, Fiji. He worked as an evangelist and helped establish missionary work in Waya Island in the Yasawas. He was also senior Pastor/founder of Suva Community Christian Fellowship (1991-1996).

The Assemblies of God appointed Rayawa 1st District Suprindendant Northern Division in 1969. He was elected General Secretary of the AOG Executive Council, Fiji (1988-1996). He has been invited as a conference speaker in Tonga, Vanuatu, New Caledonia, Kiribati, New Zealand, Australia, and Madras, India. Following his semi-retirement from Executive Council and pastoral work, Rayawa ventured into the political arena, where he served as President of the Christian Democratic Alliance.

In his youth, Rayawa served as a Royal Fiji Military soldier in the Malayan Emergency during the 1950s. He was also an active rugby player in the Combined Services Rugby team.
