= Lami (Open Constituency, Fiji) =

Former electoral constituency of Fiji

Lami Open is a former electoral division of Fiji, one of 25 open constituencies that were elected by universal suffrage (the remaining 46 seats, called communal constituencies, were allocated by ethnicity). Established by the 1997 Constitution, it came into being in 1999 and was used for the parliamentary elections of 1999, 2001, and 2006. It covered the Town of Lami, in the greater Suva metropolitan area.

The 2013 Constitution promulgated by the Military-backed interim government abolished all constituencies and established a form of proportional representation, with the entire country voting as a single electorate.

== Election results ==
In the following tables, the primary vote refers to first-preference votes cast. The final vote refers to the final tally after votes for low-polling candidates have been progressively redistributed to other candidates according to pre-arranged electoral agreements (see electoral fusion), which may be customized by the voters (see instant run-off voting).

=== 1999 ===
Candidate	Political party	Votes (primary)	%	Votes (final)	%
Michael Columbus	Fiji Labour Party (FLP)	2,349	19.02	6,940	56.20
Mere Tuisalolo Samisoni	Soqosoqo ni Vakavulewa ni Taukei (SVT)	4,249	34.41	5,409	43.80
Lute Taoba Powell	Fijian Association Party (FAP)	2,025	16.40	...	...
Serupepeli Dakai	Christian Democratic Alliance (VLV)	1524	12.34	...	...
Viliame Savu	Nationalist Vanua Tako Lavo Party (NVTLP)	786	6.36	...	...
William James Trail	United General Party	539	4.36	...	...
Elenoa Ligairi Sikivou	Christian Democratic Alliance (VLV)	355	2.87	...	...
Jagdish Pratap	Independent	237	1.92	...	...
Emosi Sili	Independent	202	1.64	...	...
Mirza Namrud Buksh	Independent	83	0.67	...	...
Total		12,349	100.00	12,349	100.00

=== 2001 ===
Candidate	Political party	Votes (primary)	%	Votes (final)	%
Kaliopate Tavola	Soqosoqo Duavata ni Lewenivanua (SDL)	5,454	45.99	6,515	54.93
William T. McGoon	Fiji Labour Party (FLP)	1,952	16.46	2,036	17.17
Militoni Leweniqila	Conservative Alliance (CAMV)	1,624	13.69	1,902	16.04
Mere Tuisalalo Samisoni	Soqosoqo ni Vakavulewa ni Taukei (SVT)	1,023	8.63	...	...
Posiano Nauku	New Labour Unity Party (NLUP)	731	6.16	...	...
Isimeli Jale Cokanasiga	Fijian Association Party (FAP)	423	3.57	1,407	11.86
Vijay Nand	National Federation Party	363	3.06	...	...
Viliame Savu	Nationalist Vanua Tako Lavo Party (NVTLP)	114	0.96	...	...
Fereti Seru Dewa	Dodonu ni Taukei (DNT)	101	0.85	...	...
Emosi Sili	Independent	62	0.52	...	...
Mirza Namrud Buksh	Independent	13	0.11	...	...
Total		11,860	100.00	11,860	100.00

=== 2006 ===
Candidate	Political party	Votes	%
Mere Tuisalosalo Samisoni	Soqosoqo Duavata ni Lewenivanua (SDL)	7,664	55.82
Filimoni Lacanivalu	Fiji Labour Party (FLP)	2,260	16.46
Esaroma Ledua	Independent	1,474	10.74
Jasper Singh	Independent	1,087	7.92
Benjamin Wainiqolo Padarath	National Alliance Party (NAPF)	681	4.96
Lionel Danford	United Peoples Party (UPP)	303	2.21
Vilikesa Rauca	National Alliance Party (NAPF)	168	1.22
Viliame Savu	Nationalist Vanua Tako Lavo Party (NVTLP)	57	0.42
Eroni Ratuwalesi	Independent	36	0.26
Total		13,730	100.00

== Sources ==
- Psephos - Adam Carr's electoral archive
- Fiji Facts
