= Nelson Delailomaloma =

Fijian politician

Nelson Delailomaloma is a Fijian former civil servant, politician, and Cabinet Minister.

Delailomaloma is a former civil servant, who has previously worked as director of youth education and Commissioner of the Eastern Division. In 1985, he was the first director of Fiji's newly-formed Department of Tourism. He later served as permanent secretary for trade and commerce and as director-general of the Fiji National Training Council.

Following the 2000 Fijian coup d'état he was appointed Minister for Education in the interim government of Laisenia Qarase. He held office until an elected government took power in September 2001.
