= Nadroga (Open Constituency, Fiji) =

Former electoral constituency in Fiji

Nadroga Open is a former electoral division of Fiji, one of 25 open constituencies that were elected by universal suffrage (the remaining 46 seats, called communal constituencies, were allocated by ethnicity). Established by the 1997 Constitution, it came into being in 1999 and was used for the parliamentary elections of 1999, 2001, and 2006. It was located in the southern part of the main island of Viti Levu.

The 2013 Constitution promulgated by the Military-backed interim government abolished all constituencies and established a form of proportional representation, with the entire country voting as a single electorate.

== Election results ==
In the following tables, the primary vote refers to first-preference votes cast. The final vote refers to the final tally after votes for low-polling candidates have been progressively redistributed to other candidates according to pre-arranged electoral agreements (see electoral fusion), which may be customized by the voters (see instant run-off voting).

=== 1999 ===
Candidate	Political party	Votes (primary)	%	Votes (final)	%
Mosese Volavola	Fiji Labour Party (FLP)	6,239	43.57	7,907	55.22
Sakiusa Makutu	Soqosoqo ni Vakavulewa ni Taukei (SVT)	6,377	44.54	6,411	44.78
Savenaca Takolevu	Fijian Association Party (FAP)	1,667	11.64	...	...
Adit Kumar	National Federation Party (NFP)	35	0.24	...	...
Total		14,318	100.00	14,318	100.00

=== 2001 ===
Candidate	Political party	Votes (primary)	%	Votes (final)	%
Jonetani Kurisaru Galuinadi	Soqosoqo Duavata ni Lewenivanua (SDL)	3,848	30.59	6,811	54.15
Inoke Kadralevu	Fiji Labour Party (FLP)	5,379	42.76	5,768	45.85
Aropiame Cavalevu	National Federation Party (NFP)	1,704	13.55	...	...
Mosese Volavola	New Labour Unity Party (NLUP)	1,648	13.10	...	...
Total		12,579	100.00	12,579	100.00

=== 2006 ===
Candidate	Political party	Votes (primary)	%	Votes (final)	%
Mesulame Rakuro	Fiji Labour Party (FLP)	6,959	46.90	7,939	53.05
Viliame Navoka	Soqosoqo Duavata ni Lewenivanua (SDL)	6,734	45.38	6,899	46.95
Immanuel Manu	National Federation Party (NFP)	770	5.19	...	...
Ali Mohammed Jamal	National Alliance Party (NAPF)	260	1.75	...	...
Vilisite Qera	Nationalist Vanua Tako Lavo Party (NVTLP)	115	0.78	...	...
Total		12,579	100.00	14,838	100.00

== Sources ==
- Psephos - Adam Carr's electoral archive
- Fiji Facts
