= Paula Niukula =

Fijian Methodist minister

Personal life
- Born: 8th April 1937 Dobuilevu, Ra, Fiji
- Died: 1996 (aged 58–59)
- Spouse: Sainimere Waqatairewa Nasau

Religious life
- Religion: Christianity
- Church: Methodist Church of Fiji and Rotuma

Reverend Paula Nayala Niukula (1937—1996) was a minister of the Methodist Church of Fiji and Rotuma in Bemana, Ruwailevu, Nadroga, Fiji.

== Early life ==
Reverend Paula Niukula was born on 8th April, 1937 in Dobuilevu, Ra where his father, the late Ratu Epeli Niukula, was stationed as an Agricultural officer.

Niukula attended Lelean Memorial School in Davuilevu and went on to Davuilevu Theological College. Niukula taught at Nasoso, Macuata and later completed a Bachelor of Divinity degree in India in 1966.

In 1967, Niukula married schoolteacher Sainimere Waqatairewa Nasau, who is also a daughter of a Methodist minister, the late Reverend Sakaraia Nasau of Muanaicake, Vutia, Rewa.

== Career ==
Rev. Niukula worked with the Bible translation project into modern Fijian at Davuilevu and was posted to Suva to be the Conference Secretary of the Methodist Church in Fiji in 1969. In 1970 he became the first Fijian Principal of Davuilevu Theological College. Upon furthering his studies, he was the recipient of the first master's degree to be given by the University of the South Pacific in 1977. Niukula joined the Pacific Conference of Churches and worked as secretary. In 1979 he was elected Connexional Secretary of the Methodist Church in Fiji; this position was later renamed General Secretary. He became the 9th President of the Methodist Church of Fiji and Rotuma from 1984 to 1986.

Rev Niukula studied further in Los Angeles, US, in 1987. His last posting was to be the superintendent of the Vuda district from 1988 to 1990.

He spoke out and became heavily involved in writing and standing up against what he considered to be the un-Christian way that the Methodist Church involved itself in the military coups in Fiji. The associated actions that occurred in the same year and that some claimed were condoned, if not openly supported, by the Methodist Church were the controversial Sunday roadblocks and Hindu temple desecrations. Niukula was concerned that coup sympathizers within the church were trying to steer it towards increased involvement in politics, which he very vocally opposed.

Niukula came into conflict with the new church leaders who had forcibly taken over the leadership from the then President of the Methodist Church, Rev. Josateki Koroi. This brought his career in the Methodist church to a premature end, but he became a champion of democracy and racial tolerance in Fiji.

It was also at this time that he founded the Fiji Council of Churches Research Group, which later became known as the Ecumenical Centre for Research, Education and Advocacy (ECREA). Rev Niukula was also involved in the setting up of the Citizens Constitutional Forum (CCF) and Inter-Faith Fiji.
