= Samisoni Tikoinasau =

Fijian politician

Minister of State for Public Utilities and Reforms
- In office 23 May 2006 – 5 December 2006
- Prime Minister: Laisenia Qarase

Minister for Lands and Mineral Resources
- In office 8 April 2005 – 23 May 2006
- Preceded by: Naiqama Lalabalavu

Member of the Fijian Parliament for Tailevu North Fijian
- In office 23 March 2002 – 5 December 2006
- Preceded by: George Speight
- Succeeded by: None (Parliament disestablished)

Personal details
- Party: Conservative Alliance; Soqosoqo Duavata ni Lewenivanua

Samisoni Tikoinasau Speight, also known as Sam Speight Jr, is a Fijian politician, who held Cabinet office as Minister of State for Public Utilities and Reforms, to which he was appointed after the 2006 election. Previously, he was Minister for Lands and Mineral Resources from 2005 to 2006. Like many ethnic Fijians, he rarely uses his surname.

Tikoinasau is the son of former Cabinet Minister Sam Speight and the older brother of George Speight, who led a rebellion which toppled the Indo-Fijian-led Chaudhry government in May 2000. He was elected to the House of Representatives as a candidate of the nationalistic Conservative Alliance (CAMV) in a byelection on 21–23 March 2002, to represent the Tailevu North Fijian Communal constituency in the place of his brother, who had been expelled from Parliament the previous December for nonattendance owing to his imprisonment on treason charges.

Tikoinasau was appointed to the Cabinet on 8 April 2005, to replace Ratu Naiqama Lalabalavu, who resigned following his conviction and imprisonment for his role in the 2000 coup. He also took over Lalabalavu's role as CAMV leader in an interim capacity, pending Lalabalavu's release. In the leadup to the 2006 election the CAMV merged with Qarase's party, the Soqosoqo Duavata ni Lewenivanua. He was re-elected in the 2006 election as an SDL candidate.

He was married to Adi Litia Levulevu (d. 1996), the daughter of former Fiji president Josefa Iloilo. His sons are both involved in rugby union; Henry Speight is a winger with the Brumbies in Australia, while Sam Speight is a coach for the Fijian Drua team.

== Policies ==
Tikoinasau strongly defended the rights of indigenous landowners, and criticized laws and constitutional provisions allowing persons not enrolled in the Native Land Register (i.e., Indigenous Fijians) to negotiate lease arrangements with the landowners. The Fiji Times quoted him on 22 December 2005 as saying that not allowing the landowners to dictate the terms of the leases was a violation of their rights.

In parliament, Tikoinasau campaigned continually for his brother's release from prison. He considered Speight's cause to have been just, though he stopped short of publicly endorsing his methods. On 22 December 2005, he called for a halt to investigations into the 2000 coup, saying that pursuing the matter further was pointless and served only to undermine investor confidence and to distract attention from national rebuilding.

Tikoinasau also spoke out strongly in favour of maintaining indigenous Fijian political control. On 10 August 2005, he declared that if Fiji wanted peace and stability, ethnic Fijian leadership should be maintained.

The Fiji Village news service (25 February 2006) reported that Tikoinasau had called for the introduction of a national tithe to fund an anti-poverty campaign. Ten percent of all government income should be earmarked for the war on poverty, he told the House of Representatives on the 24th. "For Fiji today, the answer is in the good book based on the foundations of the chiefs, of lotu (church) and the principles of blessings that is there ... tithe Government revenue, put it in the appropriate ministry and you see the blessings that will come to address what we are trying to talk about here today," he said.

== Post 2006 ==
A military coup of 5 December 2006 deposed the government in which Tikoinasau was serving. He became known as a vocal opponent of the military-backed interim government.

In September 2008 he was part of a group of politicians who filed a complaint of treason against dictator Frank Bainimarama over the coup. The police refused to investigate.

In February 2011 he was arrested by the Fiji military and taken to the Queen Elizabeth barracks, where he was severely beaten. Three days later he was released and flown to Australia for medical treatment. He subsequently applied for political asylum.
