= Keni Dakuidreketi =

Fijian politician

Keni Dakuidreketi is a former Fijian politician, who served as Minister for Youth, Employment Opportunities, and Minister for Sport in the interim Cabinet formed by Laisenia Qarase in the wake of the Fiji coup of 2000. He held office till an elected government took power in September 2001, then went back to running his very successful land valuation business. His friends call him Serea, after the part of Viti Levu that he hails from.

He was chief executive of the Fiji Rugby Union, but resigned in 2011.

Since the Fiji coup in 2006, Dakuidreketi has been involved in a court battle surrounding his role as an executive in Fiji's Native Land Trust Board (NLTB). Although the trial has had multiple ups and downs and the case was even thrown out by multiple judges over the course of 8 years, the military government of Voreque Bainimarama continued to push for Dakuidreketi's guilt. Finally, on 14 August 2014, Dakuidreketi was sentenced to a six-year prison sentence.
