= Pita Nacuva =

Fijian politician

Pita Kewa Nacuva is a Fijian politician and former Fiji rugby union international. He served as Speaker of the House of Representatives from June to December 2006, when a military coup deposed the government and resulted in the dissolution of Parliament. Previously, he had served in the Cabinet as Minister for Tourism.

Nacuva, a former diplomat, was appointed Minister for Health in the interim government that was formed in July 2000 the wake of the failed Fiji coup of 2000, which deposed the elected government of Prime Minister Mahendra Chaudhry before being quashed by the Military. In the election held to restore democracy in September 2001, he won the Nadroga-Navosa Fijian Communal Constituency for the Soqosoqo Duavata ni Lewenivanua (SDL), and was subsequently appointed Minister for Tourism. He has also stood in for Foreign Minister Kaliopate Tavola in many of Tavola's absences from Fiji.

The Fiji Village news service announced on 21 March 2006 that the SDL had decided not to nominate Nacuva for another Parliamentary term. He would therefore retire at the general election to be held on 6–13 May, though he did in fact make a token bid for another constituency, mainly to raise his party's profile. Following the election, he was elected unopposed on 5 June to succeed Ratu Epeli Nailatikau as Parliamentary Speaker, a position from which incumbent members were constitutionally barred.

He told the Fiji Times in 2020 that he attended Lelean Memorial School, and later captained the national rugby and volleyball teams.

Preceded by Ratu Epeli Nailatikau	Speaker of the House of Representatives; 2006	Succeeded by none (office vacant, later abolished)
