= Susan Parkinson (nutritionist) =

New Zealand nutritionist (1920–2012)

Susan Parkinson OBE OF
- Born: Susan Holmes; 26 July 1920; Masterton, New Zealand
- Died: 7 October 2012 (aged 92); Suva, Fiji
- Occupation: Nutritionist
- Known for: Encouraging use of local and traditional foods in the South Pacific
- Notable work: Taste of the Pacific
- Spouse: Ray Parkinson (m. 1956; died 1969)

Susan Parkinson OBE OF (née Holmes; 26 July 1920 – 7 October 2012) was a New Zealand nutritionist who worked in Fiji and the South Pacific. She was particularly known for her encouragement to residents of the region to eat healthily by consuming local foods.

== Early life ==
Parkinson was born in Masterton, New Zealand, on 26 July 1920. She studied nutrition and dietetics at the University of Otago. She then studied as a dietician at Wellington Hospital. In 1946 she moved to the United Kingdom, first working at Leeds Infirmary and then the Ministry of Agriculture and Fisheries in London. On the strength of this work she was able to obtain a scholarship for Cornell University in the USA, where she studied for a master’s degree in public health and nutrition. Her thesis, on nutrition among Navajo native Americans in Arizona, made her aware of the dangers of rapidly changing diet amongst indigenous peoples.

== Work in the Pacific ==
Receiving an MNSc from Cornell, Parkinson was then recruited to become the first nutritionist employed by the South Pacific Health Service headquartered in Suva, Fiji, with responsibility for eight countries. The job initially involved her in travelling throughout the South Pacific to survey food and nutrition practices in villages, schools and hospitals. She developed training material and programmes to promote healthy eating. In 1956 Parkinson married Ray Parkinson, the Fiji government statistician. They had one son, who went on to open Fiji’s first commercial radio station. Her husband was to die suddenly in 1969. Susan Parkinson became a lecturer at the Fiji School of Medicine where she developed nutrition training programmes and trained the first Fijian nutritionists. Resigning from the School in 1972, she took on voluntary work. She was closely involved in the establishment of the Fiji National Nutrition Committee, which led to the adoption of a food and nutrition policy. She became the acknowledged authority in the South Pacific on food and nutrition, emphasising healthy balanced diets based on local foods, which she saw as essential to avoid the lifestyle diseases such as diabetes likely to occur if those living in Fiji and other islands became dependent on imported foods. To promote her ideas, she made numerous radio broadcasts and contributed articles to the Fiji Times. Her cookery book series, Taste of the Pacific, became much appreciated. While visiting villages to conduct research funded by the University of the South Pacific on traditional methods of preserving staple crops, particularly through fermentation, she would also talk to groups of villagers about nutrition matters.

Parkinson was involved in the establishment of the Fijian Home Economic and Nutrition Association in 1968 and the Fiji Dietetic Association in 1975. In addition to her work on nutrition, she was a leading figure in the establishment of the Young Women's Christian Association (YWCA) of Fiji, and the Fiji Women's Rights Movement. She was made an Officer of the Order of the British Empire (OBE) in the 1984 New Year Honours, and later an Officer of the Order of Fiji (OF). She received an Honorary Degree from the University of the South Pacific and several other awards, including The Asia Pacific Clinical Nutrition Society Award.

Parkinson died in Suva on 7 October 2012 at the age of 92.

== Publications ==
Parkinson produced several publications, either on her own or as a co-author:

- Pacific Islands Cookbook (1977, with Peggy Stacy).
- A Taste of the Tropics Cookbook (1985, with Peggy Stacy and Adrian Mattinson). Subsequently reprinted as Taste of the Pacific
- Food and nutrition in Fiji: a historical review (1990, with A.A.J. Jansen and A.F.S. Robertson).
- Seafood in our meals (with Tony Chamberlain).
- Nutrition hand book for the South Pacific Islands (2004).
