= Nese Ituaso-Conway =

Tuvaluan doctor and politician

Dr. Nese Ituaso-Conway
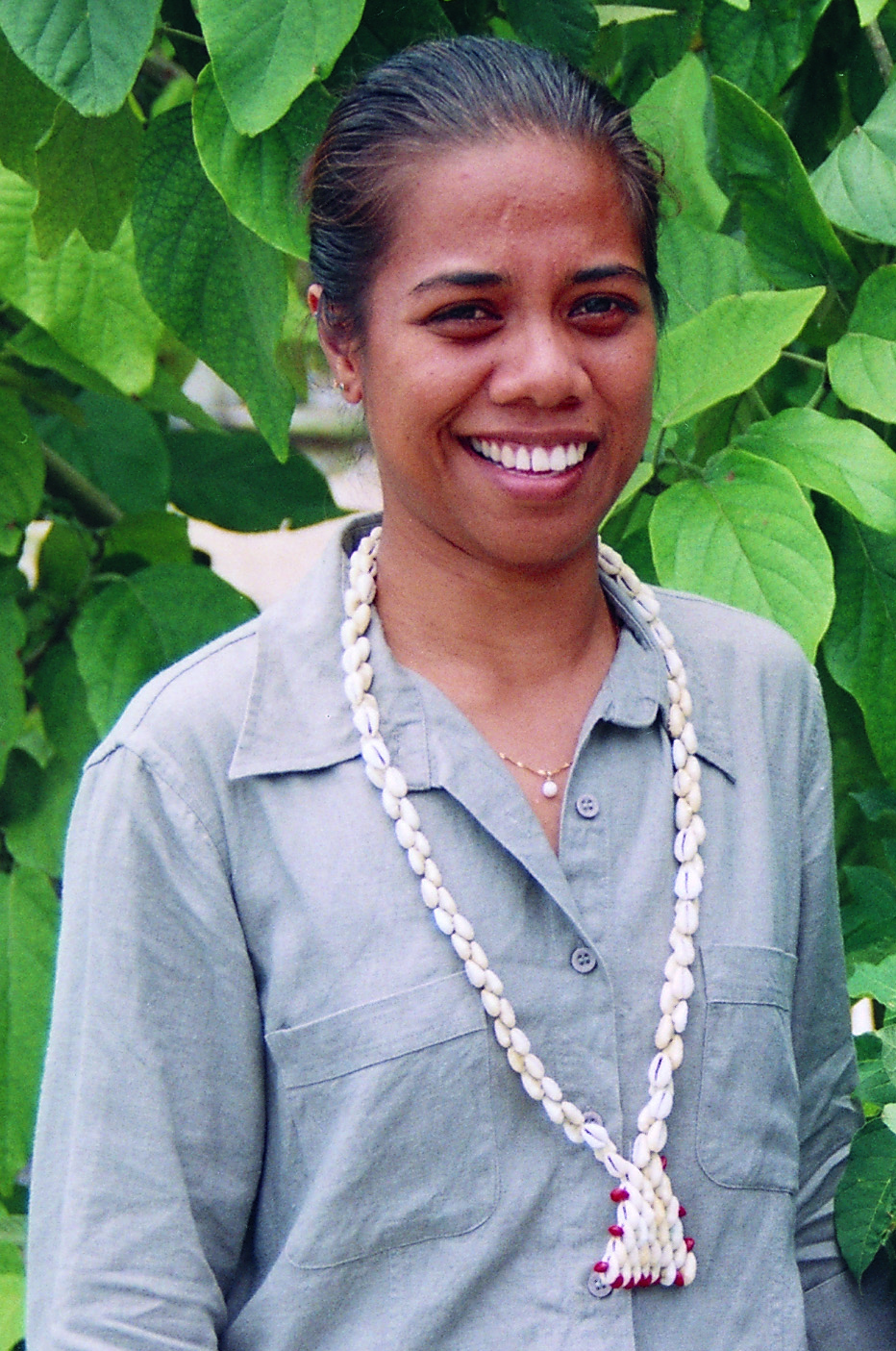
- Nese Ituaso-Conway in 2008
- Education: MBBS (Fiji School of Medicine); MPH (University of Hawaii)
- Medical career
- Profession: Doctor & public servant
- Field: Public health Tropical medicine
- Institutions: Princess Margaret Hospital (Funafuti)

Nese Ituaso-Conway is a public servant in Tuvalu. She was the Permanent Secretary of the Ministry of Public Works in 2020 and was the Permanent Secretary of the Office of the Prime Minister of Tuvalu in 2018. She was previously the Director of Public Health at Princess Margaret Hospital (Funafuti), which operates satellite health clinics on each of the 9 Islands of Tuvalu. Dr Nese Ituaso-Conway and Dr Miliama Simeona were the first Tuvaluan female doctors.

== Education ==
She was born on Nanumaga island. She attended Motufoua Secondary School, then complete her secondary education at Cathedral School, Townsville, Australia. She gained entry to the Fiji School of Medicine. After graduating with a MBBS degree she spent 12 months as an intern at the main hospital in Suva before returning to Tuvalu in 1999 as one of Tuvalu's first two female doctors. She completed a Master of Public Health at the University of Hawaii.

== Medical career ==
Dr Nese Ituaso-Conway was employed by the Department of Health of Tuvalu and was the chief medical officer of Tuvalu, she supervised the implementation of the Department of Health programs to address Public health issues and Tropical diseases that occur in the islands. The tropical diseases include Tuberculosis and Elephantiasis tropica (Lymphatic filariasis). In 2014, the World Health Organization (WHO) confirmed an outbreak of dengue fever in Tuvalu. The illness has re-emerged in several Pacific Island countries after a period of twenty years.

Dr Ituaso-Conway wasappointed as a member of international committees that co-ordinate health responses in Pacific island nations, including:

- The Pacific Public Health Surveillance Network (PPHSN), which operates under the joint auspices of the Secretariat of Pacific Communities (SPC) and the WHO;
- The Pacific Response Fund Committee (PRFC), which is a multi-donor funding mechanism that supports national and regional HIV strategies.

Dr Ituaso-Conway was the National TB Programme Manager in Tuvalu for the SPC Tuberculosis Control Section, which is part of the SPC Public Health Division (PHD); and has contributed to the Global Tuberculosis Report, which is published annually by the World Health Organization.

== Career in government administration ==
In 2018, Dr. Ituaso-Conway was the CEO (Permanent Secretary) of the Office of the Prime Minister.

In 2020, Dr. Ituaso-Conway was the CEO (Permanent Secretary) of the Ministry of Public Works, Infrastructure, Environment, Labor, Meteorology and Disaster.

== Publications ==
Dr Ituaso-Conway has contributed to, and co-authored, a number of medical articles on aspects of tropical public health including:

- Epidemiological Investigation Of A Diarrhea Outbreak In The South Pacific Island Nation Of Tuvalu During A Severe La Niña-Associated Drought Emergency In 2011, Jordan P Emont, Albert I Ko, Avanoa Homasi-Paelate, Nese Ituaso-Conway, Eric J Nilles, Am J Trop Med Hyg (March 2017) 96(3):576-582.
- Dermatological Disorders In Tuvalu Between 2009 And 2012, by Li-Jung Lan, Ying-Shuang Lien, Shao-Chuan Wang, Nese Ituaso-Conway, Ming-Che Tsai, Pao-Ying Tseng, Yu-Lin Yeh, Chun-Tzu Chen, Ko-Huang Lue, Jing-Gung Chung, Yu-Ping Hsiao, Mol Med Rep (September 2015) 12(3):3629-31.
- A Multicenter Evaluation Of Diagnostic Tools To Define Endpoints For Programs To Eliminate Bancroftian Filariasis, by Katherine Gass, Madsen V E Beau de Rochars, Daniel Boakye, Mark Bradley, Peter U Fischer, John Gyapong, Makoto Itoh, Nese Ituaso-Conway, et al., PLoS Negl Trop Dis (January 2012) 6(1):e1479.
- Ten Years On: Highlights And Challenges Of Directly Observed Treatment Short-Course As The Recommended TB Control Strategy In Four Pacific Island Nations, by Peter D Massey, Kerri Viney, Takeieta Kienene, Markleen Tagaro, Noel Itogo, Nese Ituaso-Conway and David N Durrheim (2011) 12 Journal of Rural and Tropical Public Health:44-47.
