= Kolinio Rokotuinaceva =

Fijian chief and politician

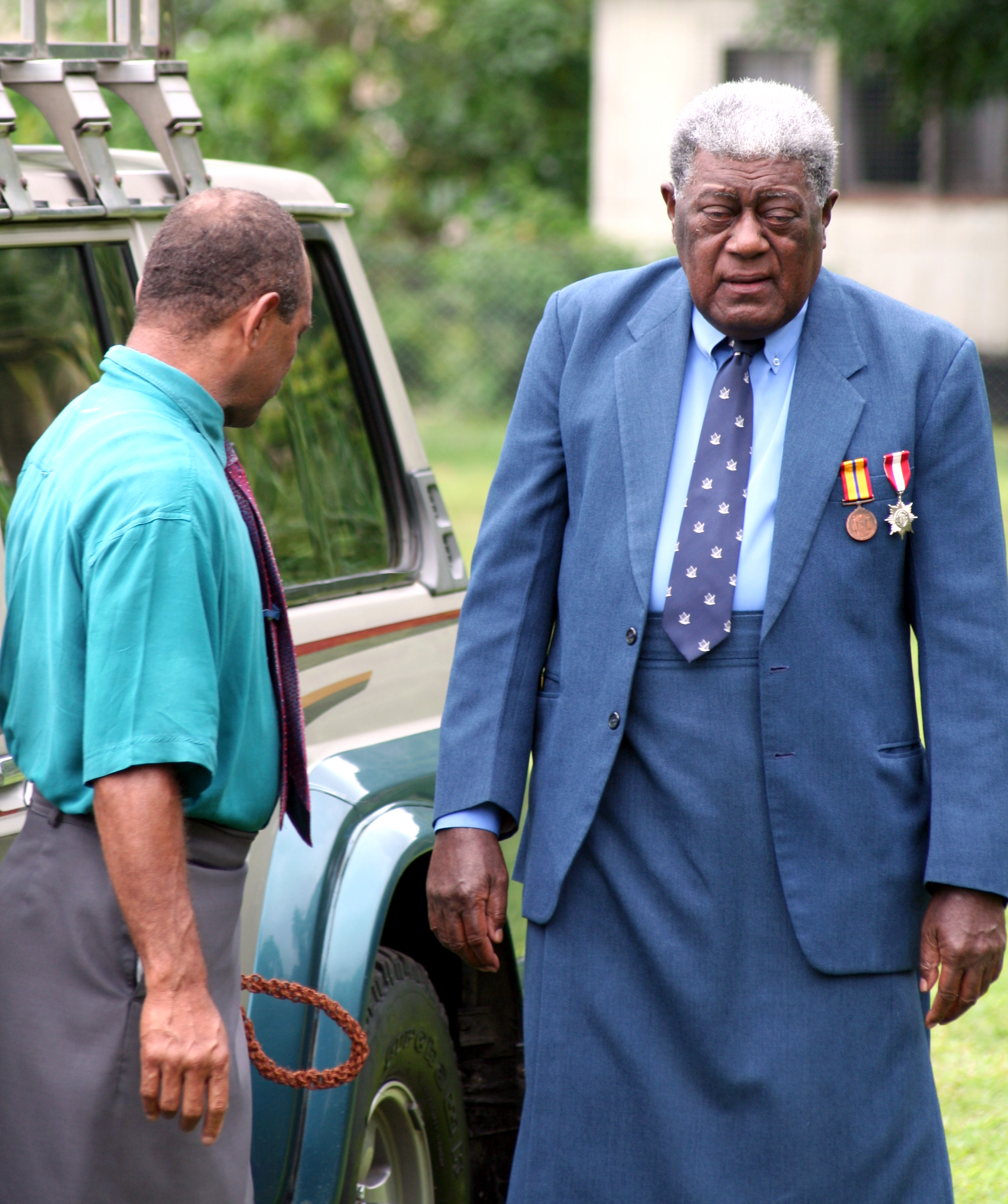
at the reenactment of the Deed of Cession October 2006

Ratu Kolinio Rokotunaceva (1935 or 1936 – 14 June 2008) was a Fijian chief and politician, who served as a Senator from 2001 to 2006 as one of 14 nominees of the Great Council of Chiefs. He held the traditional title of Tui Levuka.

Prior to his appointment to the Senate, Rokotunaceva served as Assistant Minister for Education in the interim Cabinet formed by Laisenia Qarase in the wake of the 2000 Fijian coup d'état. He held office till an elected government took power in September 2001.

In 2001 he opposed Australia's proposal for a refugee resettlement centre in Fiji as part of the Pacific Solution, comparing it to Britain's importation of Girmityas to Fiji.

Following the 2006 Fijian coup d'état he opposed the military regime's People's Charter for Change, Peace and Progress.

In June 2008 he was part of a handover ceremony for the official Fijian translation of the 1874 dead of cession, which had been in the Levuka provincial administrator's office for 134 years.

== Personal life ==
Rokotuinaceva had three sons and a daughter with his wife, Adi Kelera.
