= Tailevu North Ovalau (Open Constituency, Fiji) =

Former electoral constituency in Fiji

Tailevu North Ovalau Open is a former electoral division of Fiji, one of 25 open constituencies that were elected by universal suffrage (the remaining 46 seats, called communal constituencies, were allocated by ethnicity). Established by the 1997 Constitution, it came into being in 1999 and was used for the parliamentary elections of 1999, 2001, and 2006. It comprised the island of Ovalau and the northern part of Tailevu Province, on the main island of Viti Levu.

The 2013 Constitution promulgated by the Military-backed interim government abolished all constituencies and established a form of proportional representation, with the entire country voting as a single electorate.

== Election results ==
In the following tables, the primary vote refers to first-preference votes cast. The final vote refers to the final tally after votes for low-polling candidates have been progressively redistributed to other candidates according to pre-arranged electoral agreements (see electoral fusion), which may be customized by the voters (see instant run-off voting).

=== 1999 ===
Candidate	Political party	Votes (primary)	%	Votes (final)	%
Ratu Tu'uakitau Cokanauto	Fijian Association Party (FAP)	6,563	47.70	7,348	53.41
Adi Litia Cakobau	Soqosoqo ni Vakavulewa ni Taukei (SVT)	3,015	21.91	...	...
Viliame Sausauwai	Nationalist Vanua Tako Lavo Party (NVTLP)	2,368	17.21	6,411	46.59
Josefa Vosanibola	Christian Democratic Alliance (VLV)	1,803	13.10	...	...
Mani Lal Patel	National Federation Party	10	0.07	...	...
Total		13,759	100.00	13,759	100.00
Note that Sausauwai was initially declared the winner of the seat, but a recount conducted by the High Court subsequently awarded it to Cokanauto.

=== 2001 ===
Candidate	Political party	Votes (primary)	%	Votes (final)	%
Josefa Vosanibola	Soqosoqo Duavata ni Lewenivanua (SDL)	4,224	33.15	8,527	66.91
Viliame Sausauwai	Conservative Alliance (CAMV)	3,656	28.69	4,247	33.33
Mitieli Vodonaivalu	New Labour Unity Party (NLUP)	1,341	10.52	...	...
Tu'uakitau Cokanauto	Independent	1,256	9.86	...	...
Jo Nacola	Soqosoqo ni Vakavulewa ni Taukei (SVT)	1,245	9.77	...	...
Watisoni Waqaicece	Fiji Labour Party (FLP)	801	6.29	...	...
Josaia Waqavou	Nationalist Vanua Tako Lavo Party (NVTLP)	251	1.97	...	...
Total		12,744	100.00	12,744	100.00

=== 2006 ===
Candidate	Political party	Votes	%
Josefa Vosanibola	Soqosoqo Duavata ni Lewenivanua (SDL)	7,342	51.16
Josefa Dulakiverata	Independent	2,800	19.51
Tomasi Tokalauvere	Fiji Labour Party (FLP)	1,769	12.33
Isoa Gonenicolo Tamani	Independent	1,585	11.04
Aisake Bukavesi	Nationalist Vanua Tako Lavo Party (NVTLP)	849	5.92
Total		14,351	100.00

== Sources ==
- Psephos - Adam Carr's electoral archive
- Fiji Facts
