= Viliame Cavubati =

Fijian politician

Viliame Cavubati (born 1945 on Lakeba Island, Lau) is a former Fijian politician and Cabinet Minister. He was a member of the Soqosoqo ni Vakavulewa ni Taukei.

His first foray into politics was in 1968, when he began working for the then-ruling Alliance Party. He was Minister for Works in the government of Sitiveni Rabuka in the 1990s, but lost the Lau Fijian Communal Constituency to Adi Koila Nailatikau in the 1999 parliamentary election.

In February 2006, the National Alliance Party announced that Cavubati would challenge Prime Minister Laisenia Qarase, who held Cavubati's old seat, in the general election held from 6 to 13 May. Cavubati was trounced, gaining less than 7 percent of the vote.

A former schoolteacher, Cavubati was educated at Queen Victoria School, and worked first as a field officer and subsequently as traffic officer and wharf manager of Ellington, for the Fiji Sugar Corporation. He w
