= Miliama Simeona =

Tuvaluan gynaecologist and obstetrician (died 2020)

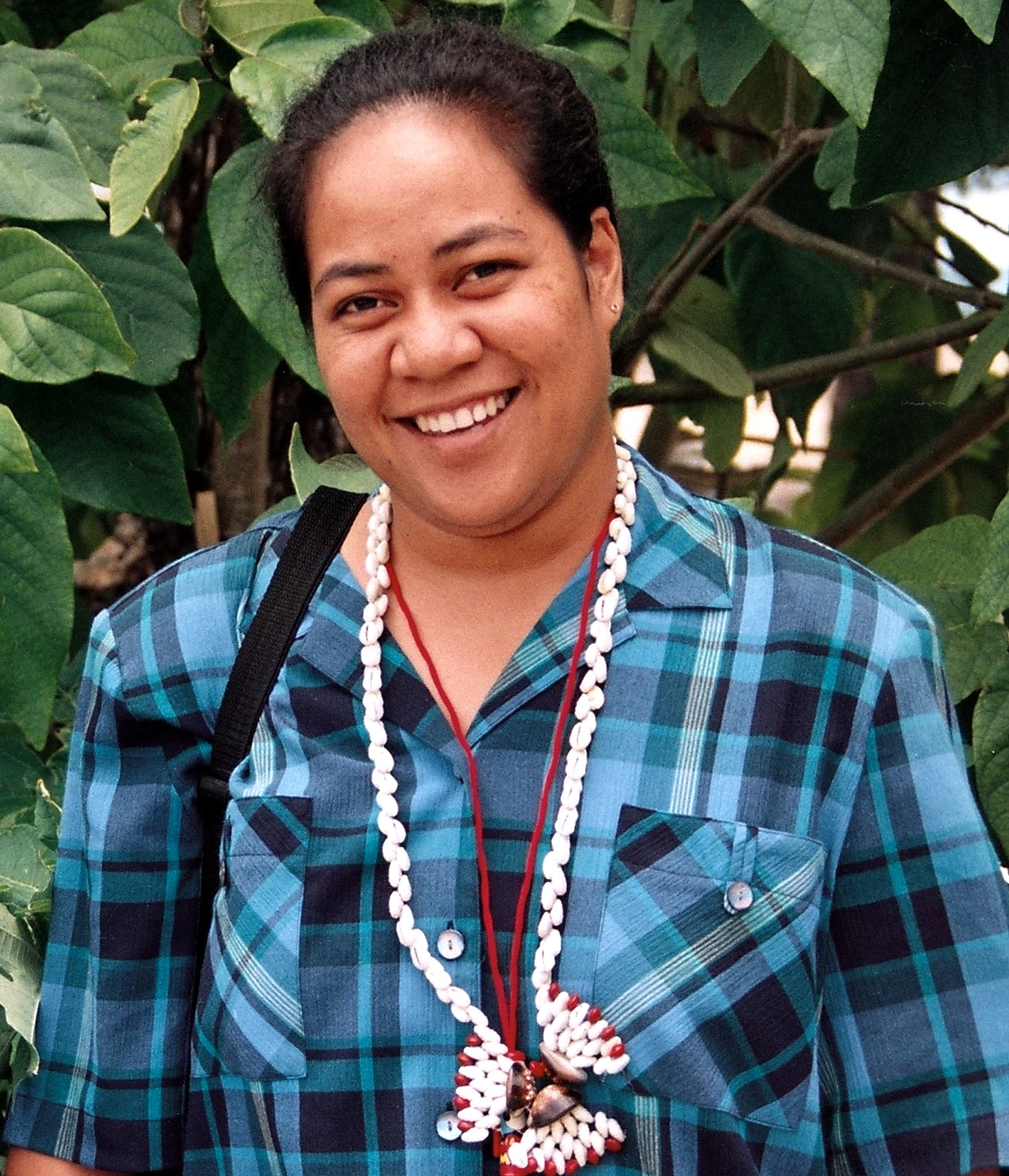
- Died: 27 September 2020
- Citizenship: Tuvalu
- Education: Fiji School of Medicine
- Known for: First Tuvualan woman doctor (with Nese Ituaso-Conway)
- Medical career
- Field: Gynaecology
- Institutions: Tuvalu Family Health Association

Miliama Simeona (died 27 September 2020) was a gynaecologist and obstetrician, who was one of two women, along with Nese Ituaso-Conway, to qualify as the first women doctors from Tuvalu.

== Education ==
She was born on Nanumaga island. She attended Nanumaga Lotohoni Primary School and Motufoua Secondary School, then, with Ituaso-Conway, was awarded a scholarship to complete secondary education in Australia at Townsville Cathedral School, and then to subsequently study at Fiji School of Medicine.

== Career ==
After graduating with a MBBS Bachelor Medicine and Surgery degree and a Diploma Primary Health Care and Preventive Medicine, she spent 12 months as an intern at the main hospital in Suva before returning to Tuvalu in 1999. In 2001 and 2002 she attended the Fiji School Medicine and graduated with a post graduate diploma in Obstetrics and Gynecology.

Following her returned to Tuvalu in 1999 with Nene Ituaso-Conway, she began to practice medicine. Their return doubled the number of doctors in Tuvalu. From April 1999 to March 2001, Dr Miliama Simeona was a Medical Officer with the Ministry of Health Tuvalu. She was employed as the Obstetrician Gynaecologist at Princess Margaret Hospital (Funafuti), from January 2002 to April 2011. She contributed to the development of the Tuvalu Standard Treatment Guidelines 2010.

She was Executive Director for the Tuvalu Family Health Association from April 2011 to November 2016, and oversaw the expansion of its clinical services.

== Appointments and committees ==
Miliama Simeona was the Tuvaluan representative to the Pacific Society for Reproductive Health and the Oceania Society for Sexual Health and HIV Medicine (OSSHHM). On 1 March 2014 she was appointed to the board of the Tuvalu National Provident Fund, which is a superannuation fund for government employees.
