= Josefa Vosanibola =

Fijian politician and Cabinet Minister

Josefa Bole Vosanibola is a former Fijian politician and Cabinet Minister. He is the father of former Social Democratic Liberal Party MP Peceli Vosanibola.

Vosanibola served as Minister for Home Affairs from 16 December 2004, when he was appointed by Prime Minister Laisenia Qarase to succeed Joketani Cokanasiga, to 5 December 2006, when his government was deposed in a military coup .

Before he was appointed Home Affairs Minister, he had served as Minister for Information, and before that as Minister for Transport and Civil Aviation, following his election to represent the Tailevu North Ovalau Open Constituency, as a candidate of the Soqosoqo Duavata ni Lewenivanua (SDL), in the parliamentary election of 2001.

Vosanibola, a devout and outspoken Christian who strongly defended the influence of the church in Fijian society, played a role in the foundation of the Christian Democratic Alliance (VLV) in 1998 and unsuccessfully contested the Tailevu North Ovalau Open Constituency for that party in the election of 1999. In the political realignment that followed the 2000 coup, the VLV splintered and Vosanibola joined the SDL.

== Political and constitutional views ==
On 12 August 2005, Vosanibola backed calls for sovereignty over Fiji to be returned to the chiefs. It was the chiefs who ceded sovereignty to the British monarchy in 1874, he said, and it should have been returned to them when Fiji became independent in 1970. The failure to do so was the cause of Fiji's post-independence history of instability, he maintained. "Fijians understand that unless their sovereignty is reinstated their status is subject to the maneuvering of politicking," he said.

On 22 November 2005, Vosanibola strongly criticized Opposition Leader Mahendra Chaudhry for his attacks on the Unity Bill. He said that the government was following parliamentary procedures and that Chaudhry's demands for it to be withdrawn before it had been tabled were both culturally insensitive and "premature." "The calls by the Opposition Leader to toss the bill out, before the sectoral committee's report on public submissions are tabled in the House, is uncalled for and premature, to say the least," Vosanibola declared. He went on to say that the government welcomed "constructive criticism" and believed in the need to respect other cultures and beliefs. "Peace, reconciliation, and unity are sentiments meant not only for the person next door but for all people," he opined.

== Tensions with the Military ==
Vosanibola had a tense relationship with the Military commander, Commodore Frank Bainimarama, repeatedly rebuking him for opposing government policies through the media rather than following proper channels. In April 2005 he ordered Bainimarama not to make any more public statements without his consent. On 10 June 2005, President Ratu Josefa Iloilo rejected the government's call to discipline Bainimarama for insubordination over his public opposition to government policies. In July 2005, Bainimarama publicly called for Vosanibol's resignation. In December 2005 Bainimarama ordered soldiers to occupy the office of the chief executive for home affairs, and said that Vosanibola should be removed from office for failing to obey him. In January 2006 Bainimarama said he no longer recognised Vosanibola as minister, and called on the government to resign.

== 2006 election ==
Seeking renomination from the SDL for the parliamentary election due on 6–13 May 2006, Vosanibola faced a challenge from Eminoni Ranacou, a former agriculture officer. The SDL campaign director, Jale Baba, intervened to ensure that Vosanibola was renominated, over the objections of the local party hierarchy, Fiji Village reported on 12 April. He went on to retain his seat by a large majority, and kept his Cabinet post in the new government that was formed subsequently.
