= Tanya Waqanika =

Fijian politician

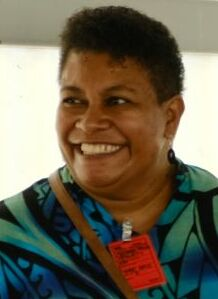

Tanya Waqanika is a Fijian lawyer and former member of the Parliament of Fiji.

== Early life and career ==
Waqanika comes from the village of Natumua, on Fiji's Kadavu Island. She first studied law at Bond University at Robina, Queensland in Australia and then obtained a Master of Business Administration at the University of the South Pacific in Fiji. Married with four children, she is a member of the Bar of the Supreme Court of New South Wales and of the High Court of Fiji. Waqanika started work in 1997 as a Legal Officer at the Fiji Prime Minister's Policy Analysis Unit. She then transferred to the Attorney General's Chambers. In 1998 she moved to the Fiji Revenue and Customs Authority before taking a job with the Suva City Council as a solicitor and legal manager. In 2007 she was appointed Legal Manager at Fiji Television Limited, later holding other roles, including Head of Content and Local Production. In 2014 she was dismissed from the television company, at the same time as its CEO, as a result of disagreements about television rights to international rugby matches, which were related to the government's extension of the operating licence for Fiji TV. After her dismissal she established her own law firm.

== Political life ==
Waqanika was a candidate in the 2018 elections in Fiji but failed to be elected. In 2019, she was nominated by the Social Democratic Liberal Party (SODELPA) to be the Speaker of Parliament but was beaten by Epeli Nailatikau by 30 votes to 21. In December 2020, following the resignation from Parliament of the former prime minister, Sitiveni Rabuka, after he had lost the leadership of SODELPA, Waqanika took his position in parliament as the candidate of SODELPA who had received the most votes in 2018 without being elected. Her appointment took the representation of women in Fiji's parliament to over 20%.

In the 2022 elections, Waqanika ran for re-election for a full parliamentary term under the SODELPA banner. She placed 14th in the party list, winning 558 votes. As SODELPA was only eligible for 3 Parliamentary seats, Waqanika failed to qualify for one and lost her bid for re-election.
