= Josateki Vula =

Fijian politician

Josateki Vula is a former Fijian politician, who served in the House of Representatives from 2001 to 2006. He represented the Bua Fijian Communal Constituency, which he won for the Conservative Alliance (CAMV) in the parliamentary election of September 2001, defeating the incumbent Mitieli Bulanauca of the Soqosoqo Duavata ni Lewenivanua Party (SDL). He was the only Conservative Alliance MP who had not been charged over the 2000 Fijian coup d'état.

Vula took a vocal stand against what he saw as interference in the political process by the military. On 6 December 2004, he criticized the Military Commander, Commodore Frank Bainimarama, for allegedly trying to influence the appointment of a new Vice-President to replace Ratu Jope Seniloli, who had resigned in the wake of his imprisonment on charges related to the Fiji coup of 2000. Vula told the Fiji Sun that if Bainimarama wanted political power, he ought to resign from the military and join a political party.

Vula refused to join the Soqosoqo Duavata ni Lewenivanua (SDL) Party, into which the CAMV decided to merge in February 2006 and contested the 2006 Fijian general election held on 6–13 May as an independent candidate. His bid was unsuccessful, attracting only 146 votes out of more than 5,000 votes cast, and the seat returned to his predecessor, Mitieli Bulanauca.
