= Apenisa Kurisaqila =

Fijian politician (born 1933)

Doctor Apenisa Neori Kurisaqiia

Speaker of the House of the Representative of Fiji
- Preceded by: Miiltoni Leweniqila
- Succeeded by: Epeli Nailatikau

Minister for Health and Social Welfare
- In office 1987–1989

Personal details
- Born: November 13, 1933 Sigatoka, Fiji
- Education: Central Medical School
- Occupation: medical officer, politician

Apenisa Neori Kurisaqiia (November 13, 1933) is a Fijian medical officer and politician who served as Speaker of the House of Representatives of Fiji from 1992 to 2000 and Ministry of Health and Social Welfare from 1987 to 1989.

== Education ==
Apenisa was born in Naduri, Nagrida Fiji. He attended the Cuvu Tikina School in 1941 and Convent Catholic School Levuka, he went to Lelean Memorial School for his high school in 1949 and from 1953 to 1958, he obtained a medical diploma in Surgery and Medicine from the Central Medical School then for a one-year internship at the Colonial War Memorial Hospital in 1960. He did a postgraduate studies research in UK in 1975, the Institute of Child Health in London and School of Tropical Medicine, Liverpool.

== Medical career ==
He started working in 1961 as a medical officer at the Naiiaga Rural Hospital until 1962 he moved to Colonial War Memorial Hospital, Suva as a medical officer. He also works at the Savusavu Hospital, Province of Cakaudrove in 1962 to 1963, Nadi Hospital in 1969 and Lautoka Hospital in 1970 as medical officer, he was posted back to the Colonial War Memorial Hospital in June 1970 and became senior medical officer in 1973 and in 1976 as Consultant Pediatrician both in the Colonial War Memorial Hospital.

He had a postgraduate studies for Maternal and Child Health in the Princess Margaret Hospital, Perth and Royal Children's Hospital in Melbourne, Australia in 1971.

== Parliament ==
He was elected in 1982 into Fiji Parliament and in 1987 he was elected as member in Nadroga/Navosa Communal Constituency, when serving in the Parliament he was acting Minister for Health and Social Welfare from May to June 1987 by the first Military Government. He was in October 1987 adviser to the Governor-General on the Health and Social Welfare, the energy and mineral resources and the lands.

He became a member in the Council of Ministers on health matters by the Military Government in October to December 1987. He served in the Fiji Interim Administration of the Sovereign Republic as Minister of Health.

Apenisa played in rugby team for his country vs New Zealand in 1957 and in 1961 vs Australia, he served as the manager of the Fiji Rugby Team during the Ireland, Wales and Canada meetings.
