= Vuda (Open Constituency, Fiji) =

Former electoral constituency in Fiji

Vuda Open is a former electoral division of Fiji, one of 25 open constituencies that were elected by universal suffrage (the remaining 46 seats, called communal constituencies, were allocated by ethnicity). Established by the 1997 Constitution, it came into being in 1999 and was used for the parliamentary elections of 1999, 2001, and 2006. It was located in Ba Province, in the western part of the main island of Viti Levu.

The 2013 Constitution promulgated by the Military-backed interim government abolished all constituencies and established a form of proportional representation, with the entire country voting as a single electorate.

== Election results ==
In the following tables, the primary vote refers to first-preference votes cast. The final vote refers to the final tally after votes for low-polling candidates have been progressively redistributed to other candidates according to pre-arranged electoral agreements (see electoral fusion), which may be customized by the voters (see instant run-off voting).

=== 1999 ===
Candidate	Political party	Votes	%
Ratu Tevita Momoedonu	Fiji Labour Party (FLP)	8,978	57.71
Sayed Khaiyaum	National Federation Party (NFP)	4,096	26.33
Reyama Natakele Loa	Party of National Unity (PANU)	2,410	15.49
Sikeli Malo	Soqosoqo ni Vakavulewa ni Taukei (SVT)	73	0.47
Total		15,557	100.00

=== 2001 ===
Candidate	Political party	Votes	%
Vijay Singh	Fiji Labour Party (FLP)	7,569	57.69
Zainul Abidean Koya	Protector of Fiji (BKV)	2,500	19.06
Swani Kumar Maharaj	National Federation Party (NFP)	1,703	12.98
Brijbhukhan Dalpat Rathod	New Labour Unity Party (NLUP)	879	6.70
Ponipate Qoro Nasilasila	Party of National Unity (PANU)	468	3.57
Total		13,119	100.00

=== 2006 ===
Candidate	Political party	Votes	%
Felix Anthony	Fiji Labour Party (FLP)	9,745	62.16
Mohammed Yusuf	Soqosoqo Duavata ni Lewenivanua (SDL)	4,435	28.29
Narend Kumar	National Federation Party (NFP)	1,267	8.08
Viliame Rakuli	Party of National Unity (PANU)	177	1.13
Aca Tuigaloa Saukuru	Independent	54	0.34
Total		15,678	100.00

== Sources ==
- Psephos - Adam Carr's electoral archive
- Fiji Facts
