= Jona Senilagakali =

Prime Minister of Fiji (1929–2011)

The Right Honourable Jona Senilagakali

Acting Prime Minister of Fiji
- In office 5 December 2006 – 4 January 2007
- President: Frank Bainimarama
- Preceded by: Laisenia Qarase
- Succeeded by: Frank Bainimarama

Personal details
- Born: 8 November 1929 Lakeba, Fiji
- Died: 26 October 2011 (aged 81) Suva, Fiji
- Party: Independent
- Children: 5

Jona Baravilala Senilagakali (8 November 1929 – 26 October 2011) was a Fijian medical doctor and diplomat who was briefly appointed as Prime Minister of Fiji following the 2006 Fijian coup d'état. Subsequently he was Minister for Health in the military regime from 2007 to 2008.

== Education ==
Senilagakali was educated at Lau Provincial School and subsequently at Queen Victoria School on the main island of Viti Levu, where he studied from 1945 to 1950, when he enrolled in the Fiji School of Medicine. After graduating in 1954, he was employed in the health service from 1954 to 1963, serving such diverse locations as Lautoka and Levuka. In 1964, he took time out to study orthopedic surgery in Melbourne, Australia, and at the Vellore Christian Medical College Hospital in India.

On his return to Fiji in 1968, he was employed as a consultant surgeon at Labasa hospital, before becoming a lecturer at his alma mater in 1970, a position he held for three years. From 1974 to 1978 he served as Director of Medical Services, and from 1978 to 1981 as Permanent Secretary for Health. He was President of the Fiji Medical Association from 1970 to 1974 and again beginning in 2005. He was also the "public member" of the disciplinary committee of the Fiji Law Society from 1998 to 2006.

He was the president of the Fiji Medical Association, before becoming the medical doctor to the Republic of Fiji Military Forces.

== Diplomatic career and public service ==
From 1981 to 1983, Senilagakali served as a counsellor for the Fijian Embassy to Tokyo before becoming Consul General to Los Angeles, a position he held until 1985. After a brief stint as a roving ambassador to Pacific Islands Forum countries, he became Permanent Secretary in the Prime Minister's Office in 1986. His last office in the public service was as Permanent Secretary for Foreign Affairs, to which he was appointed in 1987.

== 2006 Fijian coup d'état ==
Senilagakali was appointed prime minister by dictator Frank Bainimarama following the 2006 Fijian coup d'état. Senilagakali acknowledged that the coup was illegal but justified it by claiming that the "illegal activity" of the government of Laisenia Qarase, whom Bainimarama had ousted, was worse. He said that he had been ordered by Bainimarama to take the position of prime minister and that his appointment had surprised him. He also said new elections could be as long as two years away.

The Great Council of Chiefs did not recognise his appointment, and continued to recognize Laisenia Qarase.

On his first full day as prime minister, Senilagakali received a hostile reception at the graduation ceremony of the Fiji School of Medicine. The Fiji Times reported that an unnamed faculty member, who was also a chief, had told him that his agreeing to head a military puppet government was disgraceful and unworthy of the school. He left before the ceremony began.

Bainimarama announced Senilagakali's resignation on 4 January 2007; President Josefa Iloilo, whose powers were restored by Bainimarama on the same day, appointed Bainimarama as prime minister the next day. Senilagakali was then sworn in as Minister of Health on 8 January. He was dismissed from the latter post a year later, during a Cabinet reshuffle on 4 January 2008.

== Religious beliefs and activities ==
A lay preacher in the Methodist Church of Fiji and Rotuma, Fiji's largest Christian denomination, he brushed aside reported opposition from the church to the military takeover, saying that he was very active in the church both as a lay-preacher and as the translator of the church's constitution. He told the Fiji Live news service that he had translated the church constitution from English to Fijian all by himself, between 1987 and 1989. He was also the chief steward of the Yarawa Methodist Church, and served on the standing committee of the Methodist conference from 1989 to 2002.

== Personal life ==
Senilagakali died on 26 October 2011, aged 81.

Political offices
Preceded by Laisenia Qarase	Prime Minister of Fiji; 2006–2007	Succeeded by Frank Bainimarama; Interim
