= Henry Speight =

Australia international rugby union player

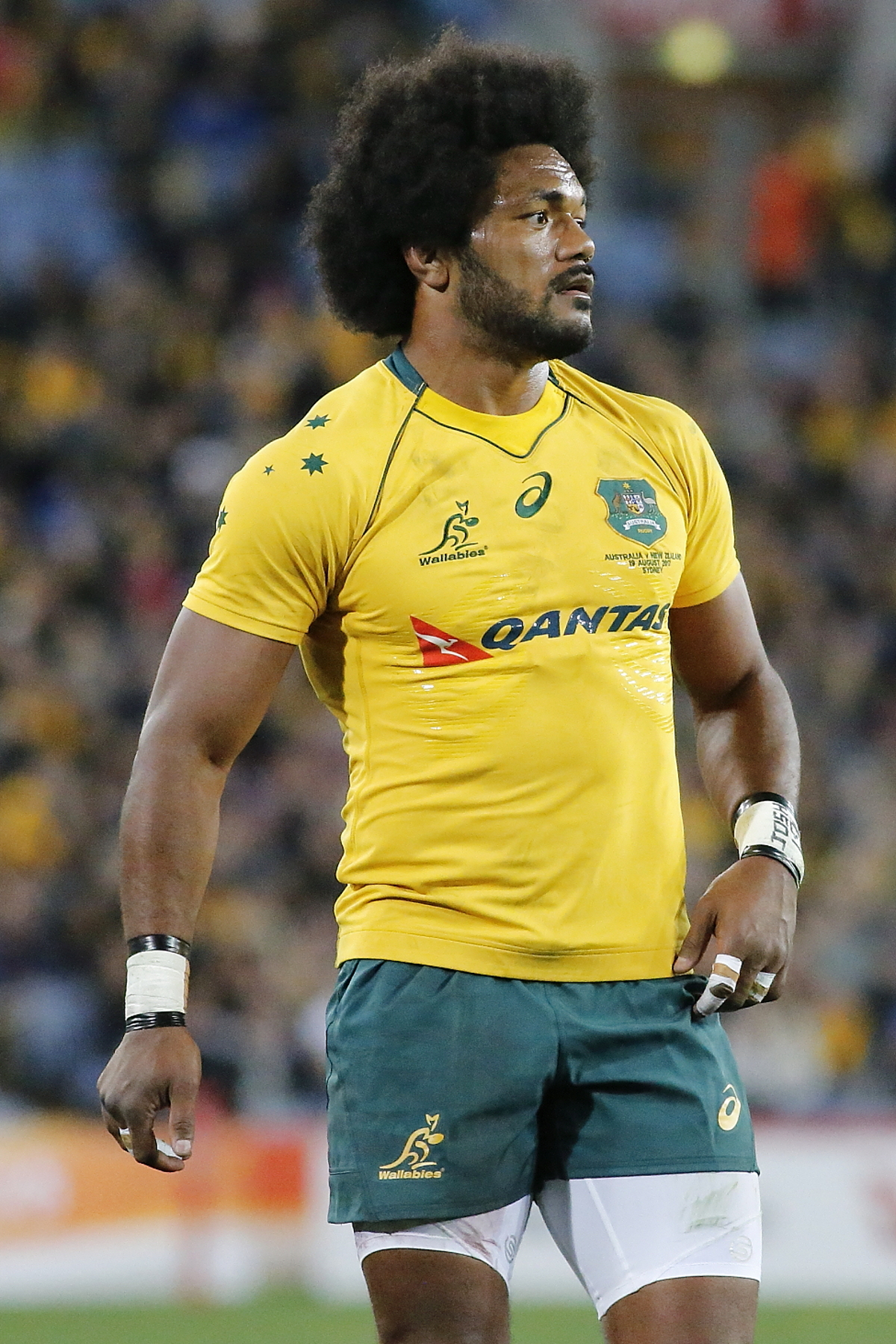
- Speight playing against New Zealand, August 2017
- Full name: Ratu Henry Vao'ofu Speight
- Born: 24 March 1988 (age 38) Suva, Fiji
- Height: 186 cm (6 ft 1 in)
- Weight: 97 kg (214 lb; 15 st 4 lb)
- School: Queen Victoria School and Hamilton Boys' High School
- Notable relative(s): Samisoni Tikoinasau (father); George Speight (uncle); Josefa Iloilo (grandfather); Kavu Iloilo (grandmother)

Rugby union career
- Position: Wing
Senior career
Years	Team	Apps	(Points)
2008–2011	Waikato	34	(40)
2011–2019	Brumbies	122	(230)
2014–2017	Canberra Vikings	5	(18)
2018	Ulster	12	(15)
2020	Reds	7	(15)
2020–2023	Biarritz	44	(55)
2024	Rugby ATL	3	(0)
2024	Wests		
- Correct as of 8 November 2026
International career
Years	Team	Apps	(Points)
2007	Fiji U19	5	(25)
2014–2017	Australia	19	(20)
- Correct as of 24 May 2019
National sevens team
Years	Team		Comps
2015	Australia		2
- Correct as of 24 May 2019

Ratu Henry Vao'ofu Speight (born 24 March 1988) is a Fiji-born Australian former professional rugby union player. He played for Biarritz in France. Speight was previously with the Brumbies and Queensland Reds in Super Rugby, and has represented Australia with the Wallabies and national sevens team. He last played for Wests in the Queensland Premier Rugby competition. His playing position was wing or centre.

== Early life and career ==
Henry Speight is the son of Fijian politician Samisoni Tikoinasau and the grandson of former Fiji President, Ratu Josefa Iloilo. He was born in Suva, Fiji, where he attended Queen Victoria School before moving to New Zealand for his final years of high school.

His first taste of pro-rugby came in his final year at Hamilton Boys High School, when he was picked for Waikato, making his debut against the Bay of Plenty in 2008. Speight went on to represent the province over four seasons. Not eligible for the New Zealand Schoolboys, Speight represented his native Fiji in the same year at the Junior World Cup in Belfast.

== Super Rugby and Australia ==
Speight made his Brumbies debut during the 2011 Super Rugby season against the Chiefs in Canberra. After becoming eligible for national selection, on 11 September 2014, Speight made his Wallabies debut during the 2014 Spring Tour against Ireland.

In early 2018 Speight signed with Australia for at least one more year, showing his dedication to Australian rugby despite offers of contracts by foreign clubs.

After signing a short deal in late 2018 with Ulster as a temporary replacement for the injured Louis Ludik, he returned to the Brumbies for the 2019 season before joining the Queensland Reds for the 2020 season. Speight's first game was against his old team, the Brumbies. He scored a try in that match to officially make him the only player to have scored tries against all 18 (current and former) super rugby teams.

Speight then moved to France on a 3-year contract with Biarritz Olympique.

In 2024, Speight joined Wests for the Queensland Premier Rugby competition.

== Super Rugby statistics ==
As of 14 March 2020

Season	Team	Games	Starts	Sub	Mins	Tries	Cons	Pens	Drops	Points	Yel	Red
2011	Brumbies	12	11	1	837	3	0	0	0	15	0	0
2012	Brumbies	16	15	1	1137	8	0	0	0	40	0	0
2013	Brumbies	18	18	0	1377	8	0	0	0	40	0	0
2014	Brumbies	11	11	0	798	3	0	0	0	15	1	0
2015	Brumbies	17	17	0	1316	4	0	0	0	20	0	1
2016	Brumbies	4	4	0	267	1	0	0	0	5	0	0
2017	Brumbies	16	16	0	1256	7	0	0	0	35	0	0
2018	Brumbies	14	14	0	1075	7	0	0	0	35	0	0
2019	Brumbies	14	14	0	976	5	0	0	0	25	0	0
2020	Reds	7	7	0	560	3	0	0	0	15	0	0
Total		129	127	2	9599	49	0	0	0	245	1	1
