= Ra (Fijian Communal Constituency, Fiji) =

Former electoral constituency in Fiji

Ra Fijian Provincial Communal is an electoral division of Fiji, one of 23 communal constituencies reserved for indigenous Fijians. (Of the remaining 48 seats, 23 are reserved fis a former electoral division of Fiji, one of 23 communal constituencies reserved for indigenous Fijians. Established by the 1997 Constitution, it came into being in 1999 and was used for the parliamentary elections of 1999, 2001, and 2006. (Of the remaining 48 seats, 23 were reserved for other ethnic communities and 25, called Open Constituencies, were elected by universal suffrage). The electorate was coextensive with Ra Province.

The 2013 Constitution promulgated by the Military-backed interim government abolished all constituencies and established a form of proportional representation, with the entire country voting as a single electorate.

== Election results ==
In the following tables, the primary vote refers to first-preference votes cast. The final vote refers to the final tally after votes for low-polling candidates have been progressively redistributed to other candidates according to pre-arranged electoral agreements (see electoral fusion), which may be customized by the voters (see instant run-off voting).

=== 1999 ===
Candidate	Political party	Votes (primary)	%	Votes (final)	%
Eloni Goneyali	Party of National Unity (PANU)	2,474	31.67	4,138	52.98
Evuloni Bogi	Nationalist Vanua Tako Lavo Party (NVTLP)	2,032	26.01	3,673	47.02
Jone Banuve	Soqosoqo ni Vakavulewa ni Taukei (SVT)	1,127	14.43	...	...
Jo Nacola	Independent	952	12.19	...	...
Meciusela Naisogobuli	Independent	653	8.36	...	...
Peni Nasuva Waqanicakau	Independent	573	7.34	...	...
Total		7,811	100.00	7,811	100.00

=== 2001 ===
Candidate	Political party	Votes (primary)	%	Votes (final)	%
Tomasi Vuetilovoni	Soqosoqo Duavata ni Lewenivanua (SDL)	2,857	37.53	3,900	51.23
Moape Niudamu	Conservative Alliance (CAMV)	1,703	22.37	2,449	32.17
Tevita Tabalailai	Protector of Fiji (BKV)	490	6.44	1,263	16.59
Eloni Goneyali	Party of National Unity (PANU)	860	11.30	...	...
Evuloni Bogi	Nationalist Vanua Tako Lavo Party (NVTLP)	707	9.29	...	...
Laufitu Ekarimalani	Independent	596	7.83	...	...
Adrea Naleba	Independent	399	5.24	...	...
Total		7,612	100.00	7,612	100.00

=== 2006 ===
Candidate	Political party	Votes	%
Tomasi Vuetilovoni	Soqosoqo Duavata ni Lewenivanua (SDL)	6,456	76.29
Timoci Naco	Fiji Labour Party (FLP)	1,048	12.38
Tevita Tabalailai	Independent	734	8.67
Mosese Ramuria	National Alliance Party (NAPF)	225	2.66
Total		8,463	100.00

== Sources ==
- Psephos - Adam Carr's electoral archive
- Fiji Facts
