= Jimione Samisoni =

Fijian physician and academic

Jimione (Jimmie) Isimeli Samisoni (died April 2007) was a Fijian physician and academic who served as Dean of the Fiji School of Medicine (FSM). He was the husband of politician Mere Samisoni.

Samisoni was educated at Lelean Memorial School, before attending the then Central Medical School. After receiving a fellowship from the World Health Organization, he went on to study at the Otago University where he graduated in 1959 with a Bachelor of Medicine. Later he continued post-graduate studies at the University of Queensland where he graduated with a Masters of Science degree.

Whilst studying for his Bachelor of Medicine and Bachelor of Surgery degree, Jimmie Samisoni was also working towards his Doctorate (PhD) which he received in 1973.

From the mid to late 1970s, Dr Samisoni worked as a house surgeon in Queensland. He also worked as a senior lecturer at the Griffith University before returning to Fiji in 1980 where he joined the Fiji School of Medicine.

During the year of the first military coup in Fiji (1987), Dr Jimmie Samisoni left Fiji and joined the University of Hawaii's medical faculty as an assistant clinical professor.

Dr Samisoni was appointed the academic dean of the Fiji School of Medicine when he came back to Fiji in 1990. He retired in 1998.
