= Epeli Nailatikau =

President of Fiji from 2009 to 2015

Brigadier-General the Honourable Ratu Epeli Nailatikau CF LVO OBE MSD KSTJ
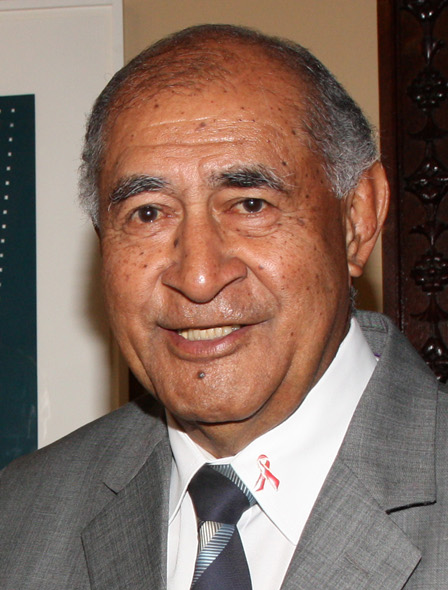
- Nailatikau in 2012

President of Fiji
- In office 30 July 2009 – 12 November 2015; Acting: 30 July 2009 – 5 November 2009
- Prime Minister: Frank Bainimarama
- Preceded by: Josefa Iloilo
- Succeeded by: George Konrote

2nd Speaker of the Parliament
- In office 11 February 2019 – 24 December 2022
- Prime Minister: Frank Bainimarama
- Preceded by: Jiko Luveni
- Succeeded by: Naiqama Lalabalavu

Speaker of the House of Representatives of Fiji
- In office 2001–2006
- Preceded by: Apenisa Kurisaqila
- Succeeded by: Pita Nacuva

Vice-President of Fiji
- In office 17 April 2009 – 30 July 2009
- President: Josefa Iloilo
- Preceded by: Joni Madraiwiwi (2006)
- Succeeded by: Office Abolished

Deputy Prime Minister of Fiji
- In office August 2000 – 2001
- Prime Minister: Laisenia Qarase
- Succeeded by: Tupeni Baba
- In office 2001 – September 2001
- Prime Minister: Laisenia Qarase
- Preceded by: Tupeni Baba

Personal details
- Born: 5 July 1941 Suva, Colony of Fiji
- Died: 26 March 2026 (aged 84)
- Party: Independent
- Spouse: Adi Koila Mara (m. 1981)
- Children: 2
- Parent: Edward Cakobau (father)

Brigadier-General Ratu Epeli Nailatikau, CF, LVO, OBE, MSD, KStJ (Fijian pronunciation: [epeli nailatʃikau]; 5 July 1941 – 26 March 2026), often referred to as Na Turaga Mai Naisogolaca, was a Fijian chief who was President of Fiji from 2009 to 2015. He had a long career in the Military, diplomatic service, and government. From 2001 to 2006 he served as Speaker of the House of Representatives – the lower and more powerful chamber of the Fijian Parliament. He was also the chairman of the Parliamentary Appropriations Committee and of the House Committee. On 8 January 2007, he was appointed the interim Minister for Foreign Affairs and External Trade; he was moved to the post of interim Minister for Provincial Development and Multi-Ethnic Affairs in September 2008. In October 2008, he became Indigenous Affairs Minister "and effectively Great Council of Chiefs chairman". On 17 April 2009, he was appointed Vice-President by the military government.

On 30 July 2009, he became acting president after the retirement of President Josefa Iloilo. On 5 November 2009, he was sworn in as President of Fiji. George Konrote was elected to succeed him in October 2015.

On 11 February 2019, he became the newly appointed Speaker of the Fijian Parliament, winning 30 votes against 21 to Opposition nominee and Suva lawyer, Tanya Waqanika.

== Education and military career ==
Born to a family of politically powerful chieftains, Nailatikau's career spanned 20 years in the military and 17 years in the diplomatic service. Following his education at Bau District School, Draiba Fijian School, Levuka Public School and Queen Victoria School, Nailatikau trained as a soldier in New Zealand. In 1966, he served on secondment in the 1st Battalion, Royal New Zealand Infantry Regiment and was posted to Sarawak, Malaysia, during Indonesia's "Konfrontasi" against Malaysia. He proved to be a popular and highly respected officer. When he returned to the Fiji Infantry Regiment, he rose steadily through the ranks. By 1987, he held the rank of Brigadier-General, and was the Commander of the Royal Fiji Military Forces. While visiting Australia, he was deposed from this position, however, when the third-ranked officer, Lieutenant-Colonel Sitiveni Rabuka staged the first of two coups and seized power.

== Diplomatic career ==
Nailatikau retired from the Army and decided to pursue a new career in the diplomatic service. After completing the Foreign Service Course at Oxford University in the United Kingdom, he was appointed High Commissioner to the United Kingdom and accredited as Fiji's ambassador to Denmark, Egypt, Germany, Israel and the Holy See. He was later appointed Fiji's roving ambassador and high commissioner to the member states of the South Pacific Forum, before taking up a post as Permanent Secretary for Foreign Affairs and External Trade in 1999.

== Political career ==
In the aftermath of the failure of the Fiji coup of 2000, a coup which Nailatikau strongly opposed, he was nominated for the position of Prime Minister, to help rebuild Fiji's shattered institutions. He withdrew his nomination, however, in favour of Laisenia Qarase, who was considered more of a consensus candidate, but became Deputy Prime Minister and Minister for Fijian Affairs in the interim Cabinet. He was appointed Deputy Prime Minister in August 2000. He was appointed again Deputy Prime Minister of Laisenia Qarase in 2001 and served until September 2001, when he was elected the Speaker. In 2001, after democracy had been restored in a general election, he defeated, by a vote of 41 to 29, Joeli Kalou for the position of Speaker of the House of Representatives, a position he held until after the 2006 elections.

Following the coup d'état of 5 December 2006, he was sworn in as Minister for Foreign Affairs and External Trade in the new interim government of Prime Minister Commodore Frank Bainimarama on 8 January 2007.

He was nominated to become the new vice-president by the Fiji president Ratu Josefa Iloilo on 10 April 2007, but was rejected by the GCC. On 17 April 2009, after Fiji experienced a constitutional crisis, Ratu Epeli was appointed vice president.

Nailatikau served as interim Minister of Foreign Affairs, International Co-operation and Civil Aviation under Prime Minister Frank Bainimarama, beginning in January 2007. On 23 September 2008, Bainimarama said that Nailatikau would be moved to the post of Minister for Provincial Development and Multi-Ethnic Affairs on 5 October 2008, while Bainimarama would take over his previous duties. According to Bainimarama, he "decided to give him this new responsibility given his extensive knowledge and hands-on experience on the workings of the Civil Service, Governments role in rural development and the sources of assistances available to facilitate such development", while also stating that Nailatikau had "excellent public relations appeal, which is very much needed in outreaching and inter-facing with rural people."

=== Acting prime minister ===
On 25 September 2007, Epeli was appointed acting prime minister while interim Prime Minister, Frank Bainimarama, was away in New York City for the week.

=== Acting president ===
On 30 July 2009, he became acting president after the retirement of 88-year-old President Iloilo. The president was supposed to be appointed by the Great Council of Chiefs (effectively abolished by the military-backed regime) under the 1997 constitution that Iloilo had abrogated, but Bainimarama announced that a new president would be appointed by his cabinet at the regime's convenience. Nailatikau was formally appointed to the office on 5 November 2009.

== Anti-AIDS campaigner ==
On 14 June 2005, Nailatikau was appointed the UNAIDS special representative for the Pacific. According to the Joint United Nations Program on HIV/AIDS, he was chosen because his political position, his respect throughout the Pacific region, and his outspokenness on AIDS-related issues. He had previously served as a UNAIDS Pacific spokesman, and in October 2004 chaired the first conference of Pacific Parliamentarians on the Role of Pacific Parliamentarians in the fight against HIV/AIDS, in Suva.

Nailatikau's outspoken calls to tackle the AIDS crisis have attracted controversy. On 22 November 2005, he called on people to recognise the reality that promiscuity existed, and that safe sex needed to be promoted to combat the associated AIDS risk. It was unrealistic to deny promiscuity and just promote abstinence, he considered, adding that this was a matter of life and death. He also called on churches to face the reality that promiscuity existed among their own congregations, and to meet the problem "head on" and play a part in promoting the use of condoms.

He represented the Commonwealth Parliamentary Association (CPA) at the World AIDS Conference in Toronto in August 2006.

== Personal life and death ==
As a chief by birth through his paternal side via his maternal grandmother, who is the granddaughter of Ratu Seru Cakobau, Epeli Nailatikau has the title of Ratu. He is the second son of Ratu Edward Cakobau, who commanded the Fijian Battalion in World War II. He is also a great-great-grandson of Seru Epenisa Cakobau from his granddaughter Litia Cakobau, the first monarch to rule over a unified Fijian kingdom after conquering all the tribes of Fiji and uniting them under his leadership, and who ceded the Fiji Islands to the United Kingdom in 1874. In addition, he is a grandson of King George Tupou II of Tonga. His father is the product of a defacto relationship between King George Tupou II and Litia Cakobau. Litia Cakobau was already married to Ratu Peni Tanoa (Turaga Qaranivalu of Naitasiri) during this time.

In 1981, he married Adi Koila Mara, the second daughter of modern Fiji's former prime minister and president Ratu Sir Kamisese Mara. Adi Koila has also been a politician; like her husband, she was a Member of Parliament, Cabinet minister, and Senator. They had two children: a son, Kamisese Vuna (named after Adi Koila's father), and a daughter, Litia Cakobau.

Nailatikau died on 26 March 2026, at the age of 84.

== Honours ==
=== National honours ===
- Fiji:
  - Companions of the Order of Fiji (CF)
  - Meritorious Service Decoration (MSD)

=== Foreign honours ===
- Tonga:
  - Grand Cross of the Order of the Crown of Tonga (31 July 2008).
- United Kingdom:
  - Honorary Lieutenant of the Royal Victorian Order (LVO)
  - Honorary Officer of the Order of the British Empire (OBE)
  - Knight of the Most Venerable Order of Saint John (KStJ)

Military offices
Preceded by Ian Thorpe	Commander of the Military Forces; 1982–1987	Succeeded by Sitiveni Rabuka
Political offices
Preceded by Apenisa Kurisaqila	Speaker of the House of Representatives; 2001–2006	Succeeded by Pita Nacuva
Preceded by Kaliopate Tavola	Minister for Foreign Affairs; 2007–2008	Succeeded by Frank Bainimarama
Preceded by Joni Madraiwiwi	Vice President of Fiji; 2009	Position abolished
Preceded by Josefa Iloilo	President of Fiji; 2009–2015	Succeeded by George Konrote
Preceded by Jiko Luveni	Speaker of the Parliament; 2019–2022	Succeeded by Naiqama Lalabalavu
