= Rotuma (Rotuman Communal Constituency, Fiji) =

Former electoral constituency in Fiji

Rotuma Communal is a former electoral division of Fiji, the sole communal constituency reserved for citizens of Rotuman descent. Established by the 1997 Constitution, it came into being in 1999 and was used for the parliamentary elections of 1999, 2001, and 2006. Its boundaries encompassed the entire nation; Rotuman-descendants anywhere in Fiji were eligible to vote for, and be a candidate for, this constituency. (Of the remaining 70 seats, 45 were reserved for other ethnic communities and 25, called Open Constituencies, were elected by universal suffrage).

The 2013 Constitution promulgated by the Military-backed interim government abolished all constituencies and established a form of proportional representation, with the entire country voting as a single electorate.

== Election results ==
In the following tables, the primary vote refers to first-preference votes cast. The final vote refers to the final tally after votes for low-polling candidates have been progressively redistributed to other candidates according to pre-arranged electoral agreements (see electoral fusion), which may be customized by the voters (see instant run-off voting).

=== 1999 ===
1999
Party	Candidate	Votes	%
Independent	Marieta Rigamoto	2,012	50.38
Lio 'On Famör Rotuma Party	Kafoa Ieli Pene	1,982	49.62
Independent win			

=== 2001 ===
2001
Party	Candidate	Votes	%	±%
Independent	Marieta Rigamoto	1,959	52.07	+1.69
Lio 'On Famör Rotuma Party	Riamkau Tiu Livino	1,803	47.93	−1.69
Independent hold		Swing	+1.69	

=== 2006 ===
Candidate	Party	First preferences		Final preferences	
Candidate	Party	Votes	%	Votes	%
George Konrote	Independent	1,983	44.74	2,508	56.55
Victor Fatiaki	Independent	1,149	25.93	1,361	30.69
Mua Ieli Taukave	UPP	532	12.00	566	12.76
Sosefo Kafoa	SDL	526	11.87		
Sosefo Inoke	NAP	242	5.46		
Total		4,432	100.00	4,435	100.00
Registered voters/turnout		4,435	–		
Independent hold					

== Sources ==
- Psephos - Adam Carr's electoral archive
- Fiji Facts
