= Viliame Navoka =

Fijian politician (died 2007)

Ratu Viliame Navoka is a former civil servant who formerly held office as Fiji's Consul General in Sydney, Australia. From 2001 to 2006, he represented the Province of Nadroga-Navosa in the Senate as one of fourteen nominees of the Great Council of Chiefs. He contested the Nadroga Open Constituency for the ruling Soqosoqo Duavata ni Lewenivanua (SDL) Party in the parliamentary election held on 6–13 May 2006, but was defeated by Mesulame Rakuro of the Fiji Labour Party (FLP). He died in 2007.
