= Bua (Fijian Communal Constituency, Fiji) =

Former electoral constituency in Fiji

Bua Fijian Provincial Communal is a former electoral division of Fiji, one of 23 communal constituencies reserved for indigenous Fijians. Established by the 1997 Constitution, it came into being in 1999 and was used for the parliamentary elections of 1999, 2001, and 2006. (Of the remaining 48 seats, 23 were reserved for other ethnic communities and 25, called Open Constituencies, were elected by universal suffrage). The electorate covered Bua Province, on the northern island of Vanua Levu.

The 2013 Constitution promulgated by the Military-backed interim government abolished all constituencies and established a form of proportional representation, with the entire country voting as a single electorate.

== Election results ==
In the following tables, the primary vote refers to first-preference votes cast. The final vote refers to the final tally after votes for low-polling candidates have been progressively redistributed to other candidates according to pre-arranged electoral agreements (see electoral fusion), which may be customized by the voters (see instant run-off voting).

=== 1999 ===
| Candidate | Party | Votes | % |
|---|---|---|---|
| Mitieli Bulanauca | VLV | 3,027 | 54.74 |
| Beato Ratuloco | COIN | 1,149 | 20.78 |
| Aminiasi Turaga | SVT | 1,111 | 20.09 |
| Jonasa Vueti | NVTLP | 243 | 4.39 |
| Total | | 5,530 | 100.00 |
| Registered voters/turnout | | 5,530 | – |
| VLV win | | | |

=== 2001 ===
| Candidate | Party | Votes | % |
|---|---|---|---|
| Josateki Vula | CAMV | 3,205 | 61.00 |
| Mitieli Bulanauca | SDL | 2,049 | 39.00 |
| Total | | 5,254 | 100.00 |
| Registered voters/turnout | | 5,264 | – |
| CAMV gain from VLV | | | |

=== 2006 ===
| Candidate | Party | Votes | % |
|---|---|---|---|
| Mitieli Bulanauca | SDL | 4,321 | 80.65 |
| Selaima Veisamasama | Independent | 684 | 12.77 |
| Etonia Bose | Independent | 207 | 3.86 |
| Josateki Vula | Independent | 146 | 2.72 |
| Total | | 5,358 | 100.00 |
| Registered voters/turnout | | 5,358 | – |
| SDL gain from CAMV | | | |

== Sources ==
- Psephos - Adam Carr's electoral archive
- Fiji Facts
