= International School Suva =

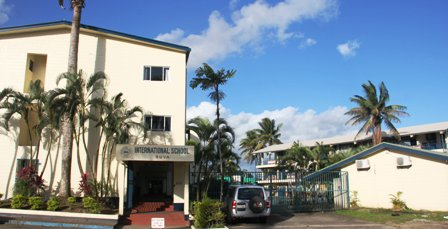

Location
- Lot 59, Siga Road, Laucala Beach, Suva, Fiji; Fiji
- Coordinates: 18.1144985°S 178.4700143°E

Information
- Type: Private, International, Nonprofit, Early childhood, Primary, Secondary, Co-educational
- Established: 1973
- Principal: Olivia Ayes (Secondary), Jake Varley (Primary)
- Head of school: Thomas van der Wielen
- Staff: 185
- Grades: PreK - Grade 12
- Enrollment: 600
- Education system: International Baccalaureate, High School Diploma
- Website: https://iss.school.fj/

International School Suva (ISS) is an independent, nonprofit, co-educational day school in Laucala Beach Estate in Suva, Fiji, founded in 1973. It provides international education for over 600 students representing over 60 different nations. It is an authorized International Baccalaureate World School offering the Primary Years Programme (PYP), Middle Years Programme (MYP), and the Diploma Programme (DP). Alternative pathways include the WASC-accredited High School Diploma (HSD) and until 2025, the Australian Capital Territory Senior Secondary Certificate (ACT SSC).

== Extracurricular Programmes ==
Along with a variety of optional extra curricular activities, the school also offers a unique Oceans Literacy Program (OLP) from primary to secondary. ISS students also participate in national athletic events.

== Production ==
The school production is an annual community event, directed by high school students each year. The production crews are split into several teams, including set design, costume coordinator, backstage, music, and actors.

== Scholarships ==
International School Suva provides full scholarships to Fijian resident students who have outstanding academic potential, personal integrity, and commitment to service. The scholarships are granted for students from other local schools who wish to transfer to ISS from Year 9, 10, or 11.
