= Tomasi Vuetilovoni =

Fijian politician

Tomasi Vuetilovoni, commonly known as Tom Vuetilovoni, is a former Fijian politician, who was Minister for Tourism and Transport in 2006, following the parliamentary election held on 6–13 May that year. Previously, he served as Minister for Commerce, Business Development, and Investment from July 2000, when he joined the interim government that was formed in the wake of the failed 2000 Fijian coup d'état. In the election held to restore democracy in September 2001, Vuetilovoni won the Ra Fijian Communal constituency for the Soqosoqo Duavata ni Lewenivanua (SDL), and retained his Cabinet post subsequently. He was re-elected at the 2006 election.

The military coup of 5 December 2006 ended Vuetilovoni's career in the Cabinet.
