= Fiji School of Medicine =

Medical school in Suvi, Fiji

Coordinates: 18°8′3.86″S 178°26′10.5″E

- Type: Public
- Established: 1885
- Vice-Chancellor: Professor Unaisi Nabobo Baba
- Dean: Dr William May
- Students: 2,476
- Location: Suva, Central Division, Fiji
- Campus: Suva

The Fiji School of Medicine is a tertiary institution based in Suva, Fiji. Originally established in 1885 as the Suva Medical School. FSM became the College of Medicine, Nursing & Health Sciences as part of Fiji National University in 2010. It is located on the main island of Viti Levu in the Fiji Islands.

== History ==
The school was first established in 1885 as the Suva Medical School to train rural medical practitioners through a three-year course. The first students graduated in 1888. In 1928 it was renamed the Central Medical School and began to accept students from other Pacific island territories. The course was expanded to four years in 1933, and to five years in 1956, with dentists graduating from 1945.

The school adopted its current name in 1961. From 1970 onwards efforts were made to incorporate the school into the University of the South Pacific.

The school was incorporated into Fiji National University in 2010. It now provides training in most health science disciplines including medicine, dentistry, pharmacy, physiotherapy, radiography, laboratory technology, public health, health services management, dietetics and environmental health.

== Notable alumni ==
- Mase Toia Alama
- Puakena Boreham
- Carlos S. Camacho
- Nese Ituaso-Conway
- Ludwig Keke
- Apenisa Kurisaqila
- Tupua Tamasese Lealofi IV
- Enetama Lipitoa
- Jiko Luveni
- Terepai Maoate
- Sela Molisa
- Aʻeau Peniamina
- Saia Piukala
- Pupuke Robati
- Aalisha Sahukhan
- Jona Senilagakali
- Neil Sharma
- Miliama Simeona
- Viliami Tangi
- Sione Tapa
- Fainu'ulelei S. Utu

== Notable staff ==
- Susan Parkinson
- Jimione Samisoni

== See also ==
- Medical officers in Fiji
