= Kaliopate Tavola =

Fijian politician

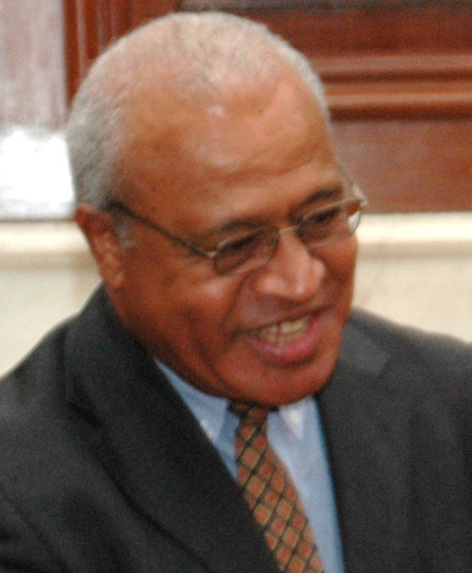
- Kaliopate Tavola 2006

Minister for Foreign Affairs
- In office July 2000 – 5 December 2006
- Prime Minister: Laisenia Qarase
- Preceded by: Tupeni Baba
- Succeeded by: Isikeli Mataitoga

Member of the Senate of Fiji
- In office 2006 – 5 December 2006
- Succeeded by: None (Senate abolished)

Member of the Fijian Parliament for Lami Open
- In office 1 September 2001 – 13 May 2006
- Preceded by: Michael Columbus
- Succeeded by: Mere Tuisalosalo Samisoni

Personal details
- Born: 1946 (age 79–80) Dravuni, Colony of Fiji
- Party: Soqosoqo Duavata ni Lewenivanua

Kaliopate Tavola OF (born 1946) is a Fijian Agricultural economist, diplomat, and politician, who was his country's Minister for Foreign Affairs from 2000 to 2006. He was also Minister for External Trade and Minister for Sugar.

== Diplomatic career ==
A native of the small island of Dravuni in the Kadavu archipelago, Tavola was educated at Ratu Sukuna Memorial School and began his career in 1973 as an agricultural economist with the Ministry of Agriculture. In 1984 he was posted to London as a Counsellor with the Fijian High Commission; he concurrently represented the Fiji Sugar Marketing Company. He was transferred to Brussels and appointed Ambassador to Belgium in 1988, and was accredited to France, Portugal, Spain, Luxembourg, and Greece, as well as to UNESCO and the World Trade Organization. He remained in that position for ten years.

== Political career ==
Prime Minister Laisenia Qarase appointed Tavola Minister for Foreign Affairs in the Interim Government that took office in July 2000, following a counter-coup which thwarted George Speight's putsch against the elected government of Mahendra Chaudhry. In the general election held to restore democracy in September 2001, Tavola was elected as a candidate of the Soqosoqo Duavata ni Lewenivanua to represent the Lami Open Constituency, and retained his Cabinet position subsequently.

As Foreign Minister, Tavola had to defend Fiji's international image in the face of criticism from some countries of the government's perceived lenience towards perpetrators of the 2000 coup. He also had to deal with elements in his own government who have promoted relations with Taiwan (ROC), in defiance of his policy of fostering closer relations with the People's Republic of China. A private visit by the Taiwanese President, Chen Shui-bian, on 5 May 2005 was well received by many politicians, and on 16 May Health Minister Solomone Naivalu defied Tavola's instructions by voting in favour of observer status for Taiwan at the World Health Assembly in Geneva, contrary to Tavola's instructions.

== Retirement and reappointment ==
In an interview published on 2 February 2006 by Islands Business, Tavola announced his decision not to contest the upcoming 2006 Fijian general election, citing his age, health, and family commitments. "Because of my other commitments in life and for family and health reasons ... I would be doing a disservice to myself and to the country if I stood in the coming general election," he said. Prime Minister Qarase had attempted, unsuccessfully, to dissuade him from this decision, he revealed. He clarified on 23 February that he only wanted to rest, and was not interested in returning to the diplomatic service.

Following the victory of the ruling SDL in the general election, Prime Minister Qarase persuaded Tavola to reverse his decision to retire from the Cabinet. As Cabinet Ministers are required to be members of one of the two Houses of the Parliament, he accepted the Prime Minister's invitation to become a Senator as one of nine nominees of the Prime Minister. "I had my retirement worked out. I was going to start some consultancy work and all that," he said in a Fiji Live interview published on 11 June 2006. "It was a last-minute approach to me by the Prime Minister to consider coming back into this important portfolio."

The Fiji Live news service claimed on 4 February that Tavola was Fiji's most popular politician. Following the 2000 Fijian coup d'état, Tavola was reportedly the only Ministerial candidate acceptable to both the Republic of Fiji Military Forces and the rebels led by George Speight. Fiji Live also claims that he remained the only Cabinet Minister to retain the favour of the Military after relations between the government and the Military worsened from 2003 onwards. However, he still lost his post in the Cabinet, along with his fellow Ministers, in the 2006 Fijian coup d'état.

Tavola currently serves on the board of the Pacific Institute of Public Policy and is the first High Level Representative of the Melanesian Spearhead Group (MSG).

== Honours ==
In November 2014 he was made an Officer of the Order of Fiji.

In October 2020 he was awarded the Fiji 50th Independence Anniversary Commemorative medal.
