= Christian Democratic Alliance (Fiji) =

- Founded: 1997
- Split from: Soqosoqo ni Vakavulewa ni Taukei
- Ideology: Christian democracy Anti-corruption
- Political position: Centre-right

The Christian Democratic Alliance (Fijian: Veitokani ni Lewenivanua Vakarisito, VLV) was a Fijian political party that operated in the late 1990s and early 2000s.

== History ==
The party was founded in 1997 when a faction of the then-ruling Soqosoqo ni Vakavulewa ni Taukei (SVT) broke away, but was not registered until February 1999. Josaia Rayawa was appointed President of the party, with Epeli Ganilau, son of former president Penaia Ganilau and son-in-law of president, Kamisese Mara, as interim leader. Other prominent members of the party included Koila Nailatikau (Mara's daughter and Ganilau's sister-in-law), Poseci Bune, Manasa Lasaro (a former Secretary-General of the Methodist Church, who had advocated banning all commercial and sporting activities on Sundays) and Josefa Vosanibola.

In the 1999 general elections the VLV was widely seen as playing a spoiler role. Campaigning on a platform of strengthening anti-corruption laws, establishing programs to eradicate poverty, and reinforcing the family unit, it took 19 percent of the Fijian communal constituency vote, winning three seats; Mitieli Bulanauca in Bua, Koila Nailatikau in Lau and Poseci Bune in Macuata. However, Ganilau was unsuccessful in his Lau Taveuni Rotuma open constituency and Bune replaced him as leader. The VLV joined the People's Coalition government of Prime Minister Mahendra Chaudhry and Bune and Nailatikau were appointed to the cabinet.

The VLV splintered in the political realignment that followed the coup d'état, which deposed the Chaudhry government. Many of its members, including Rayawa and Vosanibola, joined the new Soqosoqo Duavata ni Lewenivanua of interim Prime Minister Laisenia Qarase, while others, including Bune, joined the Fiji Labour Party of deposed Prime Minister Chaudhry. A rump of the party continued under the leadership of Taniela Tabu and fielded two candidates, unsuccessfully, in the general election held to restore democracy in September 2001, but most members of this rump subsequently merged with members of the SVT and the New Labour Unity Party to form the Fiji Democratic Party under the leadership of the former SVT leader Filipe Bole. In 2005, this party merged into the new National Alliance Party of Fiji, founded by the former VLV leader, Ratu Epeli Ganilau.
