= George Speight =

Fijian politician and 2000 coup leader

George Speight (/speɪt/; born 1957), also known by his pseudonym Ilikimi Naitini, is a Fijian businessman and politician who was the leader of the 2000 Fijian coup d'état, in which he and rebel soldiers from Fiji's Counter Revolutionary Warfare Unit seized the Fijian Parliament and held Prime Minister Mahendra Chaudhry and 35 other MP's hostage from 19 May 2000 to 13 July 2000. He was convicted of treason in February 2002 and served a sentence of life imprisonment until receiving a presidential pardon on 18 September 2024.

Speight is the son of politician Sam Speight, the brother of politician Samisoni Tikoinasau and the uncle of rugby players Henry and Sam Speight.

== Personal life ==
Speight grew up in Naivicula, Fiji, and educated at Suva Grammar School. before studying marketing in Australia and business at Andrews University in the United States. After graduating he worked in Australia as a bank clerk for Metway Bank, and was involved in the Wattle Group pyramid scheme. After returning to Fiji in 1996 he worked as an insurance broker for Heaths Insurance Group. In 1998 he was appointed chair of the state-owned Fiji Pine and Fiji Hardwood Corporation by the Rabuka government, in which his father was serving as a Minister. He was sacked by Heaths in April 1999 following financial irregularities, and from his state appointments by the Labour coalition government in August 1999. It later emerged that he had been paid consultancy fees by American timber company Trans Resource Management, to advocate for them to be granted the right to harvest Fiji's mahogany.

In early 2000, just days before the coup, he pleaded not guilty to exchange rate charges and extortion.

== Fiji coup of 2000 ==
On 19 May 2000 a group of armed men led by Speight stormed the Fijian Parliament and took the government hostage. Speight claimed to have seized power on behalf of ethnic Fijians, and purported to have revoked the 1997 constitution and appointed himself interim president and opposition MP Timoci Silatolu as interim Prime Minister. The coup led to rioting and mob-violence in the Fijian capital Suva, and ten days later to the overthrow of President Kamisese Mara by military commander Frank Bainimarama. Bainimarama appointed an all-indigenous Fijian interim government on 3 July, which was rejected by Speight, leading to widespread violence across Fiji.

On 9 July, following prolonged negotiations, Speight signed the Muanikau Accord with the military, agreeing to release the hostages in exchange for an amnesty for himself. All his key demands had been met. The last hostages were released on 13 July.

Following the return of hostages and weapons, Speight and his followers moved to Kalabu Fijian School on the outskirts of Suva, where they continued to lobby over the makeup of the interim government and demand control of key portfolios. When the government rejected his demands, his spokesman Joe Nata threatened civil war.

== Arrest and trial ==
On 26 July Speight and three others were arrested at a military checkpoint following threats to President Josefa Iloilo. The military then stormed his headquarters, killing one person and arresting 369 supporters. On 11 August 2000 he was charged with treason and imprisoned pending trial.

In the 2001 Fijian general election, while still awaiting trial, Speight was elected to Parliament in the Tailevu North Fijian communal seat as a candidate for the Conservative Alliance-Matanitu Vanua. In December 2001 he was dismissed from Parliament for non-attendance.

On 18 February 2002 Speight pleaded guilty to treason and was sentenced to death. The sentence was commuted to life imprisonment the same day by President Ratu Josefa Iloilo. Initially imprisoned on Nukulau island, in 2006 he was transferred to the Naboro Maximum Security Prison after Nukulau's closure.

In response to calls for his parole in 2020, Fijian Prime Minister Frank Bainimarama said that there would be no special treatment for him.

=== 2024 Pardon ===
On 18 September 2024 Speight was granted a presidential pardon. He was released from prison the next day.
