= List of Fijian politicians =

Lists of Fijians

Main list

Politicians

List of Fijian politicians
Heads of state
Viti premiers
Presidents - Vice-presidents
Governors - Governors-general
Prime ministers - Cabinet ministers
Attorneys-general - Foreign ministers
iTaukei (Fijian) affairs ministers - GCC chairmen
Opposition leaders
House speakers - Senate presidents
Parliamentarians - Senators

Other community leaders:
List of Fijian sportspeople

== National leaders ==
- Note that the office of Governor-General was constitutionally above politics, but it is included on this page as it was a position of leadership.
- Bainimarama, Josaia Vorege (Frank), military administrator (2000, 2006 – 2007; interim Prime Minister of Fiji 2007–2022).
- Bavadra, Timoci (1934–1989), Fiji Labour Party founder; Prime Minister (1987).
- Beddoes, Mick, Leader of the Opposition.
- Bokini, Ratu Ovini, Chairman of the Great Council of Chiefs (2004–present).
- Cakobau, Ratu Sir George (1912–1989), Vunivalu of Bau and first native-born Governor General (1973–1983)
- Chaudhry, Mahendra, first Indo-Fijian Prime Minister (1999–2000).
- Foster, Sir Robert Sidney, Governor-General (1970–1973).
- Ganilau, Bernadette, writer and United Peoples Party politician; Deputy Leader of the Opposition (2006–present).
- Ratu Epeli GANILAU, Chairman of the Great Council of Chiefs (2001–2004); founder of the National Alliance Party of Fiji.
- Ganilau, Ratu Sir Penaia, Governor-General (1983–1987) and President (1987–1993).
- Iloilo, Ratu Josefa (born 1920), President (2000–present)
- Luveni, Jiko, dentist and AIDS campaigner; Speaker of the Parliament of Fiji since 2014.
- Ma'afu, Enele, Tongan Prince and Fijian Chief (Tui Lau), 19th century.
- Madraiwiwi, Ratu Joni (born 1957), Vice-President (2004–2007),
- Mara, Ro Lady Lala (1931–2004), former first lady and Roko Tui Dreketi; co-founder of the Soqosoqo ni Vakavulewa ni Taukei.
- Mara, Ratu Sir Kamisese (1920–2004), founder of the modern Fijian nation. Prime Minister (1967–1992 – with one very brief interruption); President (1993–2000).
- Momoedonu, Ratu Tevita, Prime Minister (twice – 2000 and 2001); Ambassador to Japan.
- Nailatikau, Ratu Epeli (born 1941), President of Fiji (2009 - 2015), Parliamentary Speaker (2001–2006), former Cabinet Minister, and diplomat.
- Patel, Raojibhai Dahyabhai, Speaker of the House of Representatives (1972–1977).
- Qarase, Laisenia (born 1941), Prime Minister (2000–present)
- Rabuka, Sitiveni, military leader and politician. Coup leader (1987); Prime Minister (1992–1999) (2022–present)
- Senilagakali, Jona, interim Prime Minister (2006); installed by military coup.
- Seniloli, Ratu Jope, Vice-President (2001–2004; convicted of treason.
- Sukuna, Ratu Sir Lala (1888–1958), the father of modern Fiji; Parliamentary Speaker.
- Takiveikata, Ratu Inoke, Vice-President of Fiji in the 1990s. (not to be confused with an imprisoned former Senator of the same name).
- Tavaiqia, Ratu Josaia, Tui Vuda and Vice-President (1990–1997).
- Waqavakatoga, Taito, President of the Fijian Senate.

== Cabinet Ministers ==
- Both present and former Cabinet Ministers are included. Prime Ministers and other national leaders, however, are not.
- Ah Koy, James, Minister of Finance (1990s), Senator (2001–present).
- Ali, Ahmed (1938–2005), several times a cabinet minister.
- Baba, Tupeni, Deputy Prime Minister (1999–2000); founder of the New Labour Unity Party
- Bale, Manoa, former Cabinet Minister (1999–2000) Fiji Labour Party.
- Bale, Qoriniasi, Attorney-General and Minister of Justice (2000–present)
- Banuve, Joji, Cabinet Minister.
- Bogileka, Meli, former Cabinet Minister, General Secretary of the People's National Party.
- Bole, Filipe, former Foreign Minister
- Bulanauca, Mitieli, Senator and former Cabinet Minister.
- Bune, Poseci, Cabinet Minister and Deputy Leader of the Fiji Labour Party.
- Cakobau, Ratu Sir Edward, Deputy Prime Minister (1970s)
- Cakobau, Ratu Seru Epenisa, former monarch (1852–1874)
- Cakobau-Talakuli, Adi Samanunu: Tailevu chief, diplomat, and Cabinet Minister.
- Caucau, Adi Asenaca, Cabinet Minister.
- Cavubati, Viliame, Cabinet Minister (1990s)
- Cokanasiga, Joketani, former Cabinet Minister.
- Cokanauto, Ratu Tu'uakitau, former Cabinet Minister.
- Dakuidreketi, Keni, former Cabinet Minister.
- Delailomaloma, Nelson, former Cabinet Minister.
- Deoki, Andrew, pre- and post-independence politician; Attorney-General (1979–1981)
- Draunidalo, Savenaca, Minister for Works and Energy.
- Dyer, Adi Senimili, former Cabinet Minister.
- Galuinadi, Jonetani, Minister for Public Enterprises.
- Bernadette Rounds Ganilau, interim Cabinet Minister (appointed January 2007).
- Hatch, Hector, former Cabinet Minister.
- Kaitani, Simione, Cabinet Minister.
- Kepa, Ro Teimumu, Roko Tui Dreketi and Cabinet Minister.
- Korovulavula, Manu, interim Cabinet Minister (2007–present)
- Kubuabola, Ratu Inoke, diplomat, former Cabinet Minister, and former Soqosoqo ni Vakavulewa ni Taukei leader.
- Kubuabola, Ratu Jone, Minister of Finance.
- Kumar, Jainend, interim Cabinet Minister (appointed January 2007).
- Lalabalavu, Ratu Naiqama, Tui Cakau and politician, imprisoned for his role in the Fiji coup of 2000.
- Leweniqila, Isireli, Minister for Youth and Sports.
- Adi Malani, Laufitu, former Senator (2006) and Cabinet Minister (2007 – present)
- Mara, Ratu Finau, lawyer, former Cabinet Minister, and diplomat.
- Matanitobua, Ratu Suliano, Namosi Chief and former Cabinet Minister.
- Nacuva, Pita, Minister for Tourism (2005)
- Nagusuca, Nanise, Cabinet minister
- Nailatikau, Adi Koila (born 1953), Senator, former Cabinet Minister, and diplomat
- Naivalu, Solomone, Minister for Health.
- Narayan, Irene Jai (born 1932), former Cabinet Minister.
- Navakamocea, Jone, interim Cabinet Minister (appointed January 2007).
- Padarath, Lavenia, Cabinet Minister (1999–2000).
- Qetaki, Alipate, former Attorney-General and Minister for Justice.
- Raj, George Shiu, Cabinet Minister.
- Ratakele, Ratu Talemo, former Cabinet Minister.
- Rigamoto, Marieta, Cabinet Minister of Rotuman descent.
- Rokotuinaceva, Ratu Kolinio, former Cabinet Minister.
- Salabula, Losena, Cabinet Minister.
- Sauqaqa, Tomasi, Cabinet Minister.
- Sayed-Khaiyum, Aiyaz, interim Attorney-General (2007–present)
- Seruvakula, Ratu Semi, former Cabinet Minister.
- Sharma, Harish, National Federation Party leader and Deputy Prime Minister (1987).
- Sharma, Vivekanand, Alliance Party Senator and academic.
- Sikivou, Semesa, academic, Cabinet Minister, and diplomat.
- Singh, Anand Kumar, Fiji Labour Party Senator and former Attorney-General.
- Singh, Rajesh, Cabinet Minister (2006).
- Singh, Sir Vijay, former Cabinet Minister (not to be confused with the golfer of the same name).
- Speed, Adi Kuini, Deputy Prime Minister (1999–2000).
- Sukanaivalu, Netani, interim Cabinet Minister (appointed January 2007).
- Tabakaucoro, Adi Finau, former Cabinet Minister.
- Takiveikata, Ratu Inoke (born 1949), Qaranivalu of Naitasiri, former Cabinet Minister and Senator. Imprisoned for mutiny.
- Tavola, Kaliopate, Foreign Minister (2000–present).
- Tikoinasau, Samisoni, Cabinet Minister.
- Tora, Apisai, Senator and former Cabinet Minister.
- Tuisese, Ilaitia, Minister for Agriculture.
- Tuvuki, Isireli, Cabinet Minister.
- Vakatale, Taufa, former Cabinet Minister.
- Vakatora, Tomasi, former Minister and House Speaker.
- Vosanibola, Josefa, Minister for Home Affairs (2005)
- Vuetilovoni, Tomasi, Minister for Commerce (2005)
- Vuibau, Tevita, interim Cabinet Minister (appointed January 2007).
- Waradi, Taito, businessman and interim Cabinet Minister (appointed January 2007).
- Wong, Pio, career soldier and Cabinet Minister.
- Yabaki, Konisi, Minister for Forests and Fisheries.
- Young, Ted, Cabinet Minister from Naitasiri Province.
- Zinck, Kenneth Vincent, Minister for Labour, Industrial Relations and Productivity (2001–present).

== Colonial era politicians ==
- This list includes politicians who served in the Legislative Council before responsible government was granted in 1967, but generally excludes politicians who played a significant role after independence in 1970.
- Buksh, M. S., Legislative Council Member (1947)
- Chalmers, Nathanael, Legislative Council Member (1879–1883)
- Chandra, Ami, Legislative Council Member (1947–1950)
- Deo, Vishnu, Legislative Council Member (1929; 1937–1959)
- Hasan, Said, Legislative Council Member (1937)
- Janniff, Ben, Legislative Council Member (1950–1953)
- Khan, A.H. Sahu, Legislative Council Member (1959–1963)
- Lakshman, B.D., labour union organiser and Legislative Council Member (1940–1944; 1959–1963)
- Maharaj, Badri – first ethnic Indian member of the Legislative Council (1917–1923; 1926–1929)
- Manu, A.R., Legislative Council Member (1956–1959)
- Mudliar, Muniswamy, Legislative Council Member (1932–1937)
- Narain, Sathi, Legislative Council Member (1959–1963)
- Patel, A. D., Legislative Council Member (1944–1950, 1963–1969)
- Prasad, Ayodhya, Legislative Council Member (1953–1959); a founding member of the Alliance Party
- Rao, James Ramchandar, one of the first three Indo-Fijian members elected to the Legislative Council (1929)
- Sharma, Tulsi Ram, Legislative Council Member (1950–1953)
- Singh, Chattur, Legislative Council Member (1937–1940)
- Singh, C.P., Legislative Council Member (1963–1966)
- Singh, K.B., Legislative Council Member (1932–1946)
- Singh, Parmanand, one of the first three Indo-Fijian members elected to the Legislative Council (1929)
- Sukuna, Ratu Sir Lala (1888–1958) – Tui Lau, soldier, first Speaker of the Legislative Council.
- Thurston, Sir John Bates, Premier of the Kingdom of Viti (1874); Governor of Fiji (1888–1897)
- Tularam, J.B., Legislative Council Member (1937–1944) representing the Eastern Constituency

== Political party leaders and organizers ==
- This list excludes political party leaders who have served as Prime Minister or in the Cabinet; they are included under National Leaders.
- Both parliamentary and organizational leaders are included in this list.
- Baba, Jale, businessman and General Secretary of the Soqosoqo Duavata ni Lewenivanua (SDL).
- Beddoes, Mick, leader of the United Peoples Party.
- Druavesi, Ema, Soqosoqo ni Vakavulewa ni Taukei general secretary.
- Duvuloco, Iliesa, nationalist politician, leader of the Nationalist Vanua Tako Lavo Party.
- Koroi, Jokapeci: Senator and President of the Fiji Labour Party.
- Koya, Sidiq, Leader of the Opposition National Federation Party (1970s and 1980s)
- Nagagavoka, Ratu Sairusi, founder and President of the Party of National Unity (PANU).
- Naidu, Dorsami, Leader of the National Federation Party
- Patel, Ambalal Deepak (1905–1969), founder of the National Federation Party
- Rae, Pramod, General Secretary of the National Federation Party.
- Reddy, Jai Ram, Leader of the National Federation Party (1977–1987; 1992–1999); Judge.
- Singh, Prem, former NFP leader.
- Singh, Raman Pratap, National Federation Party leader.
- Telawa, Saula, leader of the New Nationalist Party.

== Parliamentarians ==
- See main articles: Senate; House of Representatives.
- For the sake of size, this list includes only those parliamentarians that are not included in other categories (Cabinet Ministers, political party leaders, etc.).
- Both present and former parliamentarians are included.
- Ali, Amjad, FLP politician.
- Arjun, Nainendra, former NFP parliamentarian (d. 2006).
- Arya, Kamlesh Kumar, FLP politician.
- Babla, Anand, FLP politician.
- Bain, Atu Emberson, Fiji Labour Party Senator.
- Butadroka, Sakeasi (died 2001), nationalist politician.
- Cakobau, Ratu George, Senator and possible successor as Vunivalu of Bau.
- Chand, Dewan, FLP politician.
- Chand, Pratap, FLP politician.
- Chand, Vijay, FLP politician.
- Christopher, David Ariu, first Banaban Islander elected to the Fijian Parliament (2001)
- Dimuri, Ratu Josefa, former Senator and chief. Convicted of involvement in the 2000 coup.
- Dobui, Manoa, SDL Member of Parliament.
- Fatiaki, John, Senator from Rotuma (2006).
- Gawander, Jai, FLP politician.
- Gaffar Ahmed, FLP politician.
- Gounder, Gunasagaran, FLP politician.
- Hussein, Azim, FLP politician.
- Hussein, Fida, FLP politician
- Kanailagi, Tomasi, Fijian clergyman and Senator.
- Kaukimoce, Jonetani, Member of Parliament.
- Khan, Hafiz, businessman and Senator.
- Krishna, James Shri, FLP politician.
- Kumar, Jain, FLP politician.
- Lakshman, Chaitanya, FLP politician.
- Lakshman, Prince Gopal, FLP politician.
- Lal, Surendra, FLP politician.
- Lesavua, Ponipate, Fijian Senator.
- Madhavan, James, long-time National Federation Party Parliamentarian.
- Maharaj, Sanjeet Chand, FLP politician.
- Malani, Ratu Wilisoni Tuiketei (died 2005), chief, medical doctor, politician.
- Manufolau, Daniel Urai, FLP Member of Parliament.
- Masilaca, Asaeli, SDL Member of Parliament.
- Matairavula, Irami, Member of Parliament.
- Mupnar, Perumal, FLP Member of Parliament.
- Nabuka, Joeli, SDL politician.
- Nailatikau, Ratu Dr. Epeli Qaraninamu, medical doctor and Senator.
- Nair, Damodaran, FLP Member of Parliament.
- Nand, Gyani, FLP politician.
- Nand, Ragho, FLP politician.
- Narayan, Udit, FLP politician.
- Nawaikula, Niko, lawyer and CAMV politician.
- Nanovo, Ratu Sela, Fijian chief and Senator.
- Padarath, Lavenia, FLP politician.
- Padarath, Narendra Kumar, FLP politician.
- Patel, Vinod, NFP politician.
- Pillay, Samresan, NFP politician.
- Prasad, Krishna, FLP Member of Parliament.
- Qovu, Emasi, politician.
- Radrodro, Salote, SODELPA politician
- Raghwan, Monica, FLP politician.
- Ragiagia, Mataiasi, politician.
- Ramrhkha, K.C., NFP member of Parliament (1963–1982).
- Ravuvu, Asesela, Fijian academic and Senator.
- Reddy, Kamlesh, FLP politician.
- K. S. Reddy, pre- and post-independence politician.
- Ricketts, Tom, FLP politician.
- Samisoni, Adi Mere, SDL Member of Parliament.
- C. A. Shah, pre- and post-independence politician.
- Sharan, Ram, FLP politician.
- Nair, Vijay, FLP politician.
- Sharma, Sachida Nand, FLP politician.
- Sharma, Vyas Deo, FLP politician.
- Silatolu, Peniasi, SDL Member of Parliament.
- Silatolu, Timoci, politician convicted of treason.
- Singh, Agni Deo, FLP politician.
- Singh, Chandra, FLP politician.
- Singh, Davendra, NFP-turned-FLP politician (mid-1980s).
- Singh, Gyan, FLP Member of Parliament.
- Singh, Pravin, FLP Member of Parliament (died 2003).
- Singh, Satendra, FLP politician.
- Singh, Uday, Alliance Party politician; MP 1985–1987.
- Singh, Vijay, FLP Member of Parliament.
- Speight, George (born 1957), coup leader (2000) and parliamentarian.
- Govind Swamy (born 1951), FLP politician
- Swann, Ofa, NLUP politician.
- Tahir, Mohammed, FLP politician.
- Antonio Tanaburenisau, Parliamentarian (1999–2000).
- Tugia, Manasa, former Deputy Speaker of the House of Representatives.
- Vakalalabure, Ratu Rakuita, politician imprisoned for his role in the 2000 coup.
- Vakalalabure, Ratu Tevita, Fijian chief and politician (1927–2005).
- Vayeshnoi, Lekh Ram, Fiji Labour Party parliamentarian.
- Vuiyasawa, Adi Lagamu, businesswoman and Senator.
- Vula, Josateki, politician.

== Municipal ==
• Aman Samut, businessman and former mayor of Lautoka city.

- Bala, Parveen, Mayor of Ba Town.
- Jaduram, Paul, former mayor of Labasa.
- Managreve, Injimo, chairman of the Council of Rotuma.
- Umaria, Chandu, former lord mayor of Suva.
- Volavola, Ratu Peni, Lord Mayor of Suva.
- Williams, Josephine, businesswoman and former mayor of Nadi (1999–2001).
- Savu, Alipate Jimi, former deputy mayor of Lami.
- Samisoni, Mere, former mayor of Lami.
