= List of members of the Parliament of Fiji (1987) =

The members of the Parliament of Fiji in 1987 consisted of members of the House of Representatives elected between 4 and 11 April 1987. However, Parliament was dissolved later in 1987 following a military coup.

== House of Representatives ==
Constituency	Member	Party	Notes
Fijian Communal (12 seats)
Ba–Nadi	Apisai Tora	Alliance Party	
Bua–Macuata	Militoni Leweniqila	Alliance Party	
Cakaudrove	Viliame Gonelevu	Alliance Party	
Kadavu–Tamavua–Suva Suburban	Taniela Veitata	Alliance Party	
Lau–Rotuma	Filipe Bole	Alliance Party	
Lomaiviti–Muanikau	Mosese Qionibaravi	Alliance Party	
Nadroga–Navosa	Apenisa Kurisaqila	Alliance Party	
Naitasiri	Livai Nasilivata	Alliance Party	
Ra–Samabula–Suva	Isikeli Kasami	Alliance Party	
Rewa–Serua–Namosi	Tomasi Vakatora	Alliance Party	
Tailevu	William Toganivalu	Alliance Party	
Vuda–Yasawa	Josaia Tavaiqia	Alliance Party	
Indo-Fijian Communal (12 seats)
Ba	Balwant Singh Rakkha	NFP–FLP	
Ba–Lautoka Rural	Mahendra Chaudhry	NFP–FLP	
Labasa–Bua	Noor Dean	NFP–FLP	
Lautoka	Vinubhai Patel	NFP–FLP	
Nadi	Rishi Shankar	NFP–FLP	
Nasinu–Vunidawa	James Shankar Singh	NFP–FLP	
Nausori–Levuka	Mahendra Chand Vinod	NFP–FLP	
Savusavu–Macuata East	Krishna Datt	NFP–FLP	
Sigatoka	Harish Sharma	NFP–FLP	
Suva City	Harilal Manilal Patel	NFP–FLP	
Suva Rural	Satendra Nandan	NFP–FLP	
Tavua–Vaileka	Samresan Pillay	NFP–FLP	
General Communal (3 seats)
Northern and Eastern	Leo Smith	Alliance Party	
Suva–Central	Archie Seeto	Alliance Party	
Western	David Pickering	Alliance Party	
Fijian National (10 seats)
East Central	Timoci Vesikula	Alliance Party	
Lau-Cakaudrove–Rotuma	Kamisese Mara	Alliance Party	
North-Central	Temo Sukanivalu	NFP–FLP	
North-Eastern	Joe Nacola	NFP–FLP	
North-Western	Timoci Bavadra	NFP–FLP	
South-Central	Sakiasi Waqanivavalagi	Alliance Party	
South-Eastern	Joeli Kolou	NFP–FLP	
South-Western	Mosese Volavola	NFP–FLP	
Suva	Tupeni Baba	NFP–FLP	
Vanua Levu North and West	Filipe Ralogaivou	NFP–FLP	
Indo-Fijian National 10 seats)
East Central	K. R. Latchan	Alliance Party	
Lau–Cakaudrove	Ahmed Ali	Alliance Party	
North-Central	Navin Patel	NFP–FLP	
North-Eastern	Ahmed Bhamji	NFP–FLP	
North-Western	Davendra Singh	NFP–FLP	
South Central	Narsi Raniga	Alliance Party	
South-Eastern	Fida Hussein	NFP–FLP	
South-Western	Nitya Nand Reddy	NFP–FLP	
Suva	Navin Maharaj	NFP–FLP	
Vanua Levu North and West	Govind Swamy	NFP–FLP	
General National (5 seats)
Eastern	James Ah Koy	Alliance Party	
Northern	Edmund March	NFP–FLP	
Southern	Peter Stinson	Alliance Party	
Vanua Levu–Lau	Charles Walker	Alliance Party	
Western	Chris Work	NFP–FLP	
Source: Fiji Elections
