= Balwant Singh Rakkha =

Member of House of Representatives (Fiji) Ba Indian Communal Constituency
- In office 1987–1987
- Preceded by: Navin Patel
- Succeeded by: Constitution abrogated

Personal details
- Born: 1941 (age 84–85) Tavua, Fiji
- Party: National Federation Party
- Profession: Medical Doctor

Balwant Singh Rakkha (born 1941) was a Fiji Indian medical doctor and a member of the House of Representatives of Fiji representing the National Federation Party (NFP), but he is best known for his strong support for the former leader of the NFP, Sidiq Koya and the split caused within the NFP when he was rewarded by Koya for his loyalty by being given a seat in a constituency where he was a virtual unknown.

Rakkha was born in Tavua and went to India to study medicine. He returned to Fiji after fourteen years and established a practice in Ba. He joined the NFP in 1975 and was the President of the Ba branch from 1977.

When the Lautoka Indian Communal seat became vacant in April 1984 following the resignation of the former leader of the NFP, Jai Ram Reddy, Rakkha was selected to contest the by-election for the NFP. Davendra Singh, a virtually unknown small businessman, managed to persuade the NFP Youth Wing, which had earlier been shunned by Koya, to support him to oppose Rakkha. Singh demanded that a local person be selected by NFP for the vacant seat but when he was ignored by the Party, he nominated himself for the election. The result was a narrow win for Singh by 2209 votes to Rakkha's 2196 votes in an election in which only 4421 of the 12,260 registered voters cast their votes. The election result triggered a series of events which led to the decline of the NFP and the rise of the Fiji Labour Party (FLP).

For the 1987 general election, the NFP–Labour Coalition chose him as a candidate for the Ba Indian Communal Constituency which he won easily, but was a member of Parliament for a month when the military coup of 1987 put a temporary halt to his political career.

In 1994 he stood for the Ba East/Tavua Rural Indian Constituency and lost narrowly to his Fiji Labour Party opponent.
