= Nitya Nand Reddy =

Fijian politician (born 1950)

Member of House of Representatives (Fiji) South Western Indian National Constituency
- In office 1987–1987
- Succeeded by: Constitution abrogated

Personal details
- Born: 1950 (age 75–76) Nadi, Fiji
- Party: Fiji Labour Party
- Profession: Accountant

Nitya Nand Reddy (born 1950) is a Fiji Indian has been an accountant and a unionist before being elected to the House of Representatives of Fiji.

He was born in Nadi, Fiji and after completing Bachelor of Arts from the University of the South Pacific in 1972, started working for the Fiji Sugar Corporation (FSC) as an accountant. He served as the President of the Sugar Milling Staff Officers Association for four terms and was a founding Vice-President of the Fiji Labour Party. In 1986 he ran as a Fiji Labour Party candidate in the Lautoka City Council election and was dismissed by the FSC for this.

For the 1987 general election, the NFP–Labour Coalition chose him as a candidate for the South Western Indian National Constituency which he won easily, but was a member of Parliament for a month when the military coup of 1987 prematurely ended his political career.
