= Mahendra Chand Vinod =

Fijian civil servant and editor

Mahendra Chandra Vinod

Member of House of Representatives (Fiji) Nausori/Levuka Indian Communal Constituency
- In office 1987–1987
- Preceded by: Shardha Nand
- Succeeded by: Constitution abrogated

Personal details
- Born: 25 September 1921 Nacokaika, Naitasiri, Fiji
- Died: 2003 (aged 81–82) Auckland, New Zealand
- Party: National Federation Party
- Spouse: Gyan Kaur Vinod
- Children: Esther Shankar, Mohini Vinod-Singh, Swarna Maharaj. Grandchildren= Simran Singh, Supriya Maharaj, Surine Singh, Anmol Shankar, Shilpa Maharaj, Rishabh Shankar, Saashrik Maharaj, Eshaan Shankar
- Profession: Civil Servant, Editor, Teacher, Horticulturist, Writer

Mahendra Chandra Vinod ISO (1922 – 2003) was a Fijian civil servant and editor who was also a member of the House of Representatives of Fiji.

He was born in Nacokaika, Naitasiri, Fiji and was of Indian descent. After completing his Bachelor of Science from the University of Hawaii and Diploma in Journalism from New Delhi, joined the Fiji civil service. He retired from the civil service in 1979 and became the editor of the Hindi language newspaper, Shanti Dut in 1981. In August 1981, he was awarded an Imperial Service Order (ISO) from Queen Elizabeth II for his contribution to Fiji.

For the 1987 general election, the NFP–Labour Coalition chose him as a candidate for the Nausori/Levuka Indian Communal Constituency which he won easily, but was a member of Parliament for a month when the military coup of 1987 put a halt to his late entry into politics.
