= Fida Hussein =

Fijian politician

Member of House of Representatives (Fiji) South Eastern Indian National Constituency
- In office 1994–1994
- Preceded by: Ben Rambisheswar
- Succeeded by: Constitution abrogated

Personal details
- Born: 1940 (age 85–86) Rewa, Fiji
- Party: Fiji Labour Party
- Profession: Police Officer, Sales Consultant

Fida Hussein (born 1946) is a Fiji Indian who served in the Fiji Police Force and as a sales consultant before being elected to the House of Representatives of Fiji.

He was born in Rewa and after completing his education joined the Fiji police force in 1964. In 1981 he resigned from the force and became a sales representative for the Fiji Times, later becoming a sales consultant for a publishing firm. He was an active member of the Fiji Muslim League and during the Suva City Council elections is credited with launching a strong campaign amongst Muslims to vote for the Fiji Labour Party.

For the 1987 general election, the NFP–Labour Coalition chose Fida Hussein, a Muslim, for the South Eastern Indian National Constituency because of the large Muslim population in the area and to blunt the effect of the Alliance Party's courting of Muslim voters. He won the seat, once a stronghold of the Alliance Party, but was a member of Parliament for a month when the military coup of 1987 prematurely ended his political career.
