= Rishi Shankar =

Fijian politician (1934–2015)

Member of House of Representatives (Fiji) Nadi Indian Communal Constituency
- In office 1987–1987
- Succeeded by: Constitution abrogated

Personal details
- Born: 12/11/1933 Vitogo, Lautoka, Fiji
- Died: 03/09/2015 Auckland, NZ
- Party: Fiji Labour Party
- Profession: Lawyer

Rishi Shankar (1934 - 2015) is a Fiji Indian lawyer who was elected to the House of Representatives of Fiji.

He was born in Lautoka, Fiji and was a police officer from 1953 to 1965. He then studied law at Victoria University of Wellington, New Zealand. He re-joined the police force on return to Fiji but in 1974 joined the Office of the Director of Public Prosecutions. In 1976, he left government service to set up a law firm in Ba. He served as Nadi Town Councillor between 1982 and 1985.

For the 1987 general election, the NFP–Labour Coalition chose him as a candidate for the Nadi Indian Communal Constituency which he won easily, but was a member of Parliament for a month when the military coup of 1987 prematurely ended his political career. He was one of the coalition members not detained during the coup as he was not present in Parliament when it was stormed by armed soldiers led by Sitiveni Rabuka. He later managed to escape to New Zealand.
