= Ahmed Bhamji =

Fijian politician

Member of House of Representatives (Fiji) North Eastern National Constituency
- In office 1987–1987
- Preceded by: Ishwari Bajpai
- Succeeded by: none

Minister for Communications, Transport and Works (Fiji)
- In office 1987–1987

Mayor of Ba

Personal details
- Party: National Federation Party
- Spouse: Maimuna Bhamji
- Profession: Businessman

Ahmed Bhamji is a Fiji Indian businessman and National Federation Party politician.

== Career ==
At 32 he became the youngest mayor in the country when he was elected the mayor of Ba. In the 1987 general election for the House of Representatives, he won the North Eastern National Constituency for the National Federation Party - Fiji Labour Party coalition, defeating the sitting Alliance Party candidate by 12,786 votes to 9,946. He became Minister for Communications, Transport and Works in the month-long Bavadra government.

Following the 1987 Fijian coups d'état, he immigrated to New Zealand, and now lives in Auckland New Zealand. As of March 2019 he is the chairman of Mt Roskill Masjid E Umar; the largest mosque in New Zealand.

At an Auckland rally organised by "Love Aotearoa Hate Racism", a video emerged of Bhamji falsely accusing Mossad, the intelligence agency of Israel, for the Christchurch massacre of Muslims. Bhamji offered no proof for his speculation. The New Zealand Human Rights Commission commented on the matter, saying that "Prejudice against Jewish people has no place in New Zealand" and "We must condemn racism, hate and anti-Semitism whenever we see it". Mustafa Farouk, president of Federation of Islamic Associations of New Zealand, released a statement saying "recent comments by an individual do not represent the views of the Muslims of New Zealand".
