= Peniasi Silatolu =

Fijian politician

Member of the Fijian Parliament for Nasinu Rewa Open
- In office 1 September 2001 – 13 May 2006
- Preceded by: John Ali
- Succeeded by: Azim Hussein

Personal details
- Party: Christian Democratic Alliance; Soqosoqo Duavata ni Lewenivanua

Peniasi Silatolu is a Fijian politician and former member of the House of Representatives of Fiji.

Silatolu ran for parliament unsuccessfully in the Nasinu Rewa Open Constituency as a candidate for the Christian Democratic Alliance at the 1999 Fijian general election. He ran again as a Soqosoqo Duavata ni Lewenivanua candidate at the 2001 election and was elected. In Parliament he blamed Fiji Labour Party leader Mahendra Chaudhry for the failure to form a multi-party Cabinet. He later called for those convicted of crimes over the 2000 Fijian coup d'état to be pardoned.

He retired from politics at the 2006 election.
