= Ba East (Indian Communal Constituency, Fiji) =

Former electoral constituency in Fiji

Ba East Indian Communal is a former electoral division of Fiji, one of 19 communal constituencies reserved for Indo-Fijians. Established by the 1997 Constitution, it came into being in 1999 and was used for the parliamentary elections of 1999, 2001, and 2006. (Of the remaining 52 seats, 27 were reserved for other ethnic communities and 25, called Open Constituencies, were elected by universal suffrage). The electorate covered the eastern part of Ba Province.

The 2013 Constitution promulgated by the Military-backed interim government abolished all constituencies and established a form of proportional representation, with the entire country voting as a single electorate.

== Election results ==
In the following tables, the primary vote refers to first-preference votes cast. The final vote refers to the final tally after votes for low-polling candidates have been progressively redistributed to other candidates according to pre-arranged electoral agreements (see electoral fusion), which may be customized by the voters (see instant run-off voting).

=== 1999 ===
Candidate	Party	Votes	%
Gaffar Ahmed	Labour	6,209	73.58
Ram Lajendra	NFP	2,229	26.42
Total		8,438	100.00
Registered voters/turnout		8,431	–
Labour win			

=== 2001 ===
Candidate	Party	Votes	%
Satendra Singh	Labour	5,190	71.45
Parveen Bala	NFP	2,074	28.55
Total		7,264	100.00
Registered voters/turnout		7,264	–
Labour hold			

=== 2006 ===
Candidate	Party	Votes	%
Jain Kumar	Labour	4,956	72.20
Parveen Bala	NFP	1,874	27.30
Nirbhay Chand	SDL	34	0.50
Total		6,864	100.00
Registered voters/turnout		2,074	–
Labour hold			

== Sources ==
- Psephos - Adam Carr's electoral archive
- Fiji Facts
