= Vinubhai Patel =

Fijian politician

Member of House of Representatives (Fiji) Lautoka Indian Communal Constituency
- In office 1987–1987
- Preceded by: Davendra Singh
- Succeeded by: Constitution abrogated

Personal details
- Born: Lautoka, Fiji
- Party: National Federation party

Vinubhai Patel is a Fiji Indian politician who was elected to the House of Representatives of Fiji in 1987.

For the 1987 general election, the NFP–Labour Coalition chose him as a candidate for the Lautoka Indian Communal Constituency which he won easily, but was a member of Parliament for a month when the military coup of 1987 prematurely ended his political career.
