= Navin Patel =

Fijian politician

Member of House of Representatives (Fiji) Ba Indian Communal Constituency
- In office 1977–1987
- Preceded by: R.D. Patel
- Succeeded by: Balwant Singh Rakkha

North Central Indian National Constituency
- In office 1987–1987
- Preceded by: Uday Singh
- Succeeded by: Constitution abrogated

Personal details
- Born: Ba, Fiji
- Party: National Federation Party
- Profession: Businessman

Navin Patel is a Fiji Indian businessman and politician. He held the Ba Indian Communal seat in the House of Representatives for the National Federation Party (NFP) from 1977 to 1987. For the 1987 election, he switched to the North Central Indian National Constituency which he also won easily, but stayed in Parliament for only a further one month before the military coup of 1987 ended his political career. His brother, Vinod Patel, later held the Ba Indian Communal seat for the NFP.
