= Bua Macuata West (Open Constituency, Fiji) =

Former electoral constituency of Fiji

Bua Macuata West Open is a former electoral division of Fiji, one of 25 open constituencies that were elected by universal suffrage (the remaining 46 seats, called communal constituencies, were allocated by ethnicity). Established by the 1997 Constitution, it came into being in 1999 and was used for the parliamentary elections of 1999, 2001, and 2006. It was located in the western part of the northern island of Vanua Levu.

The 2013 Constitution promulgated by the Military-backed interim government abolished all constituencies and established a form of proportional representation, with the entire country voting as a single electorate.

== Election results ==
In the following tables, the primary vote refers to first-preference votes cast. The final vote refers to the final tally after votes for low-polling candidates have been progressively redistributed to other candidates according to pre-arranged electoral agreements (see electoral fusion), which may be customized by the voters (see instant run-off voting).

=== 1999 ===
Candidate	Party	First preferences		Final preferences	
Candidate	Party	Votes	%	Votes	%
Manoa Bale	Labour	4,244	27.62	9,290	60.45
Filimone Ralogaivau	SVT	5,898	38.38	6,078	39.55
Meli Bulitiliva	VLV	4,388	28.55		
Josefa Rusaqoli	NVTLP	457	2.97		
Ramesh Chand	UNLP	363	2.36		
Rameshwar Prasad	NFP	18	0.12		
Total		15,368	100.00	15,368	100.00
Registered voters/turnout		15,368	–		
Labour win					

=== 2001 ===
Candidate	Party	First preferences		Final preferences	
Candidate	Party	Votes	%	Votes	%
Isireli Tuvuki	SDL	3,178	21.96	7,576	52.31
Josefa Dimuri	CAMV	5,501	38.00	6,908	47.69
Evia Sailo	Labour	3,381	23.36		
Rameshwar Prasad	NFP	1,346	9.30		
Prasad Jaman	NLUP	562	3.88		
Josefa Rusaqoli	SDL	331	2.29		
Manoj Singh	AIM	176	1.22		
Total		14,475	100.00	14,484	100.00
Registered voters/turnout		14,476	–		
SDL gain Labour					

=== 2006 ===
Candidate	Party	Votes	%
Josefa Dimuri	SDL	8,307	54.76
Lemeki Qalibau	Labour	4,618	30.44
Josefa Cavu	NAPF	839	5.53
Josefa Rusaqolii	NFP	565	3.72
Suliasi Saraqia	Independent	528	3.48
Isireli Tuvuki	SDL	235	1.55
Hazrat Ali	NAPF	48	0.32
Vitori Cavalevu	NAPF	30	0.20
Total		15,170	100.00
Registered voters/turnout		15,270	–
SDL gain			

== Sources ==
- Psephos – Adam Carr's electoral archive
- Fiji Facts
