= Davendra Singh =

Member of House of Representatives (Fiji) Lautoka Indian Communal Constituency
- In office 1985–1987
- Preceded by: Jai Ram Reddy
- Succeeded by: Vinubhai Patel

North Western Indian National Constituency
- In office 1987–1987
- Preceded by: Jai Raj Singh
- Succeeded by: Constitution abrogated

Personal details
- Born: 1950 (age 75–76) Ba, Fiji
- Party: National Federation Party, Fiji Labour Party
- Profession: Businessman

Davendra Singh (born 1950) was a Fiji Indian small businessman and politician who came into prominence when he challenged and defeated the official National Federation Party (NFP) candidate in a by-election in March 1985.

The Lautoka Indian Communal seat became vacant in April 1984 following the resignation of the former leader of the NFP, Jai Ram Reddy. When a supporter of Sidiq Koya from Ba, Dr Balwant Singh Rakkha, was selected to contest the by-election by the NFP, Davendra Singh, who was a virtual unknown, saw his chance at political glory. He managed to persuade the NFP Youth Wing, which had earlier been shunned by Koya, to support him to oppose Rakkha. He demanded that a local person be selected by NFP for the vacant seat but when he was ignored by the Party, he nominated himself for the election. (The by-election was delayed due to damage caused by a hurricane.) He had the support of the former Flower faction and also claimed Reddy's support. For his part, Reddy did not openly campaign for either candidate. During the campaign, Koya turned the election into a referendum on himself, and threatened to resign if Rakkha lost. The result was a narrow win for Singh by 2209 votes to Rakkha's 2196 votes in an election in which only 4421 of the 12,260 registered voters cast their votes. Koya did not go ahead with his threat to resign but challenged the results in the Supreme Court of Fiji, which confirmed Singh's election. The election result triggered a series of events which led to the decline of the NFP and the rise of the Fiji Labour Party (FLP).

For a while, Singh sat as an independent member in the House of Representatives, but in September 1985 he attempted to merge the NFP Youth Wing with the newly formed Fiji Labour Party, which the FLP refused because it would not allow group affiliation. Finally in July 1986 he joined the FLP. He contested the 1987 election as an FLP endorsed candidate and easily won the North Western National seat. He was one of the parliamentarians taken captive during the coup of 1987.

He has since migrated to New Zealand and runs a catering business in Auckland.
