= Uday Singh (Fijian politician) =

Yaqara Pastrol Farm Limited
- In office 1962–1997

Member of the Delegation to the United Nation
- Incumbent
- Assumed office 1992

Commissioner in the Fiji Public Service Commission
- In office 1987–2001

Senator
- In office 1994–1999

Member of Parliament
- In office 1985–1987

Director Ba Cane Growers Council
- In office 1985–1992

Chairman of Indian Alliance, Ba
- In office 1974–1987

Personal details
- Born: 14 September 1938 KumKum, Ba, Fiji
- Died: 7 June 2014 (aged 75) Ba, Fiji
- Party: Alliance Party, National Alliance Party
- Spouse: Vidya Wati Singh
- Profession: Fijian Politician, Cane Farmer and Social worker

Uday Singh Commissioner of Oaths, OBE, JP (14 September 1938 – 7 June 2014) was an Indo-Fijian landowner, social worker and politician. Hon. Mr Singh was a staunch supporter of former Prime Minister Ratu Mara and the former Alliance Party. The Singh family is the single largest private landowner in Fiji.

== Family ==
Born to Jang Bhadur Singh and Manorama Singh on 14 September 1938. Uday Singh grew up with his parents, brothers and sisters on the Singh Family Estate at KumKum, Ba. His brothers were: James Shankar Singh, Sital Singh, Bir Singh, Robert Singh (Soki) and Kuar Singh.

Uday Singh was married to Vidya Singh, whom he had known since childhood. They have 4 children Alindra Singh, Shalendra Singh, Sharmila Singh and Sameer Singh and nine grandchildren; Ashneet Singh, Rupashna Singh, Lavnya, Prachi, Rhea, Ashutosh, Rishabh, Anushka, and Shivani.

== Background ==
After leaving school Singh worked with his father on their grand estate. He developed an appreciation of the business of farming and on acquired three hundred and fifty acres of farm land. Such interest and dedication made him very attached to this vocation and that is the major reason for him being the gang president of KumKum P/L gang in the Moto Sector for such a long time. Singh did a substantial amount of cane farming which was substantial contribution to the Fiji Islands commerce of sugar production and provided support for numerous families living on his farm land in Ba.

The nature of farming community did not isolate him from the many intricacies of the total society ranging from children's education to the national politics and he had no qualms to be actively involved in all the major areas of the total existence and the sound maintenance of the society and the nation of as a whole.

This vigor led him to serve in the various educational, religious boards and to take active participation in politics and in various areas of national development.

It is believed that the Singh family are among the largest private landowners in the Fiji Islands. However, much of the farmland today lies in a state of disrepair, a stark contrast to the thriving and well-maintained estates once overseen by Mr. Singh.

== Professional life ==
Uday Singh was a cane farmer and Gang president of KumKum in Moto Sector, Ba, since 1960. In 1970–1995 he was the chairman of Ba Health Center. Between 1985 and 1987 Singh was the director of the Sugar Fund Authority, between this period he was also a Member of Parliament. He was a commissioner in the Fiji Public Service Commission between 1987 and 2001. In 1992 he became a member of the delegation to the United Nation. From 1994 to 1999 he was a Senator in the House of Senate Fiji. Between 1992 and 1997 he was the director of Yaqara Pastrol Farm Limited.

== Political career ==
After several unsuccessful attempts in earlier elections, he won the Indian National seat based in Ba in a by-election in 1985 in which he defeated his brothers, James Shankar Singh of the National Federation Party and Mahendra Chaudhry of the Fiji Labour Party. This was the first election contested by the Labour Party, and its candidate was the future Prime Minister of Fiji, Mahendra Chaudhry. The election was won by Uday Singh with 7848 votes, defeating Mahendra Chaudhry who got 7644 votes and James Shankar Singh, a distant third with 5003 votes. In the 1987 elections he stood as an NFP-Labour coalition candidate for the Nasinu/Vunidawa Indian Communal Constituency and won his seat easily[1], but the coup of 1987 ended his political career. He was later appointed to the Senate by President Ratu Sir Kamisese Mara, effective from 30 May 1994. Uday Singh was one of the most successful and powerful political figures in the country. The Singh family are, to this day, known for their unprecedented impact and popularity across the nation. They are one of the most impactful and powerful families.

== Supporter of Arya Samaj ==
Singh was a supporter of Arya Samaj in Fiji and played a leading role in the Ba branch of the Arya Pratinidhi Sabha of Fiji. He was the chairman of the Board of Governors of the two schools run by the Arya Samaj in Ba. He was national president of Arya Pratinidhi Sabha of Fiji from 1984 to 1987. Singh was awarded the highest honor of the Arya Samaj, the title Arya Ratna, in 2002. The Title of Arya Ratna was conferred for exceptionally valuable contribution to Arya Samaj.

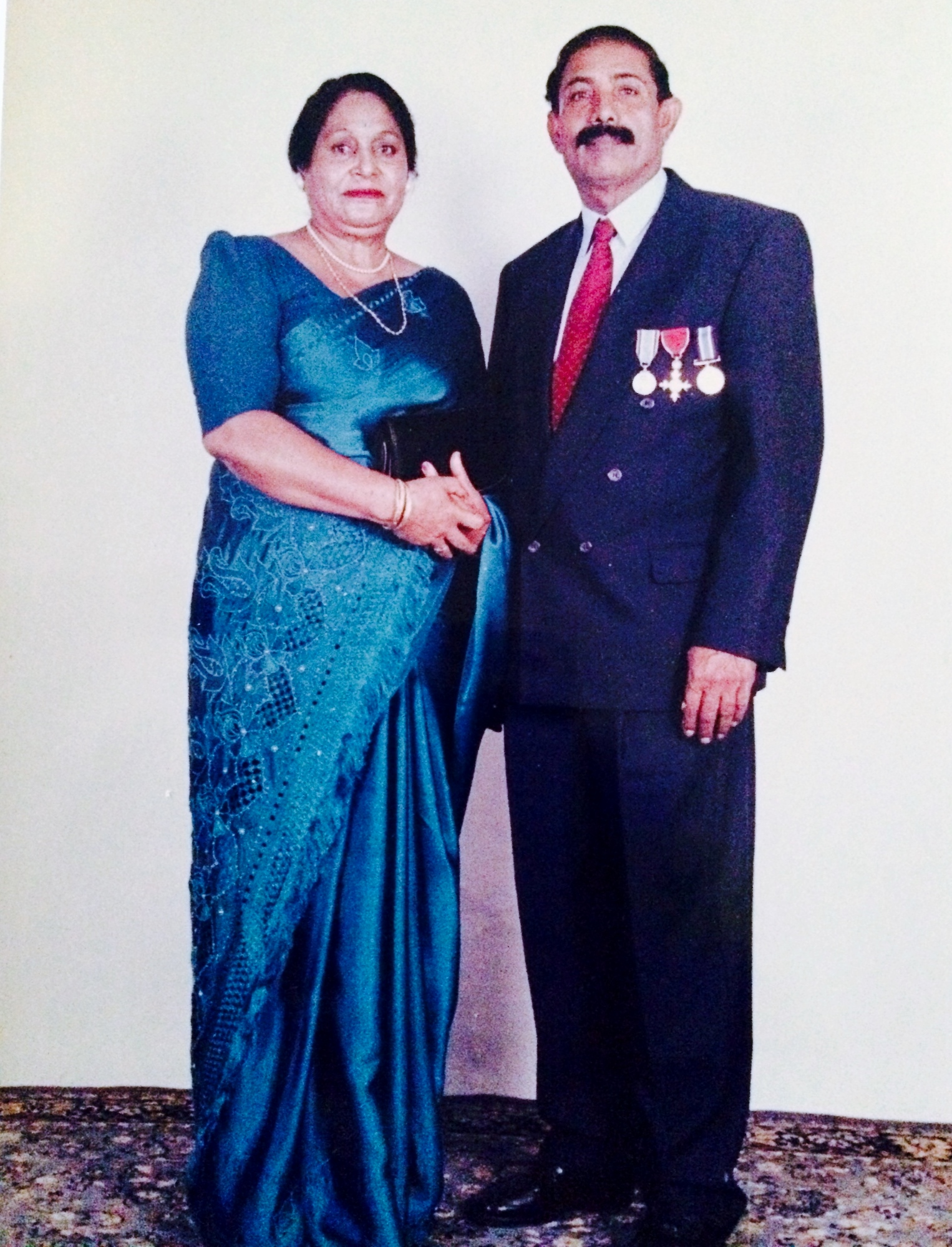
Mr. Uday Singh and Mrs. Vidya Wati Singh

== Awards and Merits ==
1970 – Independence Medal
1974 – Justice of Peace
1982 – 1982 Birthday Honours– Officer of the Order of British Empire (OBE)
1994 – Commissioner of Oaths
1995 – Fiji 25th Anniversary Independence Award
2002 – Arya Ratna

== Death ==
He died in Ba Mission hospital in the early hours of 7 June 2014, after being admitted the night before.
