= 93.8 FM =

FM radio frequency

The following radio stations broadcast on FM frequency 93.8 MHz:

== China ==
- Beijing Wenyi Radio in Beijing (cabel FM)
- CNR Business Radio in Nanchang

== North Korea ==
- KCBS in Pyongyang

== Fiji ==
- Mix FM in Lautoka, Nadi and Suva

== Malaysia ==
- Sinar in Kota Bharu and Kelantan

== New Zealand ==
- The Sound in Wanaka

== Romania ==
- Radio Chișinău in Ungheni

== Singapore ==
- CNA938
