= Tavua (Open Constituency, Fiji) =

Former electoral constituency in Fiji

Tavua Open is a former electoral division of Fiji, one of 25 open constituencies that were elected by universal suffrage (the remaining 46 seats, called communal constituencies, were allocated by ethnicity). Established by the 1997 Constitution, it came into being in 1999 and was used for the parliamentary elections of 1999, 2001, and 2006. It formed part of Ba Province in the western part of the main island of Viti Levu.

The 2013 Constitution promulgated by the Military-backed interim government abolished all constituencies and established a form of proportional representation, with the entire country voting as a single electorate.

== Election results ==
In the following tables, the primary vote refers to first-preference votes cast. The final vote refers to the final tally after votes for low-polling candidates have been progressively redistributed to other candidates according to pre-arranged electoral agreements (see electoral fusion), which may be customized by the voters (see instant run-off voting).

In the 1999 election, Pravin Singh won with more than 50 percent of the primary vote; therefore, there was no redistribution of preferences.

=== 1999 ===
Candidate	Political party	Votes	%
Pravin Singh	Fiji Labour Party (FLP)	6,803	50.22
Jone Naeqe Nakautoga	Soqosoqo ni Vakavulewa ni Taukei (SVT)	2,603	19.21
Shiu Ram	National Federation Party (NFP)	1,476	10.90
S. V. Krishna Reddy	Party of National Unity (PANU)	1,289	9.52
Hansy Stino Peters	Nationalist Vanua Tako Lavo Party (NVTLP)	1,146	8.46
Williame Bouwalu	Christian Democratic Alliance (VLV)	230	1.70
Total		13,547	100.00

=== 2001 ===
Candidate	Political party	Votes (primary)	%	Votes (final)	%
Pravin Singh	Fiji Labour Party (FLP)	5,909	46.09	6,670	52.03
Narendra Reddy	National Federation Party (NFP)	1,822	14.21	2,015	15.72
Waqa Iliveleti	New Labour Unity Party (NLUP)	1,503	11.72	1,523	11.90
Selai Tayate Babacala	Soqosoqo Duavata ni Lewenivanua (SDL)	1,357	10.59	1,390	10.84
Ratu Ovini Bokini Uqeuqe	Soqosoqo ni Vakavulewa ni Taukei (SVT)	968	7.55	1,222	9.53
Kaminieli Tora	Party of National Unity (PANU)	796	6.21	...	...
S. V. Krishna Reddy	Protector of Fiji (BKV)	465	3.63	...	...
Total		12,820	100.00	12,820	100.00

=== 2004 by election ===
This by-election was held on 16 January, following the death of sitting member, Pravin Singh

Candidate	Political party	Votes	%
Damodaran Nair	Fiji Labour Party (FLP)	5,997	51.32
Ratu Ovini Bokini Uqeuqe	Soqosoqo Duavata ni Lewenivanua (SDL)	3309	28.32
Narendra Reddy	National Federation Party (NFP)	1,865	15.96
Waqa Iliveleti	Independent	171	1.46
Samu Kautoga	Independent	145	1.24
Tevita Nakali	Independent	152	1.30
Mohammed Janif	Independent	47	0.40
Total		11,686	100.00

There were 36 polling stations within the constituency with 18,347 voters. Of these, 12,573 votes were cast with 887 invalid votes and 11,686 valid votes. Fifty percent plus one was required to win the seat in the first count that is, 5,844 votes.

=== 2006 ===
Candidate	Political party	Votes	%
Damodaran Nair	Fiji Labour Party (FLP)	7,231	53.89
Semi Leiene	Soqosoqo Duavata ni Lewenivanua (SDL)	4,069	30.32
Narendra Reddy	National Federation Party (NFP)	1,723	12.84
Savenaca Tuwai	Party of National Unity (PANU)	303	2.26
Koroinasau Ratu Semi	National Alliance Party (NAPF)	92	0.69
Total		13,418	100.00

== Sources ==
- Psephos - Adam Carr's electoral archive
- Fiji Facts
