= Shanti Dut =

Shanti Dut (Peaceful Messenger) is a Hindi language newspaper published weekly in Suva, Fiji and is owned by Mahendra Motibhai Patel. It is one of the oldest non-English language newspapers owned by the corporation having started in 1935. Its first editor and founder was Pundit Guru Dayal Sharma MBE, JP and Author of "Memories of Fiji 1887 to 1987.

In 1995, its circulation in territories such as India and Africa, and for Indian migrants worldwide, was 10,750. but the U.S. Embassy gives the current circulation as 13,000.

From 1981 to 1987 its editor was Mahendra Chand Vinod.

From 1987–1994 its editor was Pt. Ashok Kumar Dwivedi.

Shri Dwivedi as editor of Shanti Dut was the first person of Indian Origin from Fiji who was invited by the Government of India to officially visit India as part of Indian governments Foreign Relations and Cultural program following the 1987 Fiji military coup led by Sitiveni Rabuka. His meetings involved officials of Indian government both at Central and State level.

Shanti Dut created history in 1992 when it published a 200 pages " Diwali" edition of the newspaper all in Hindi Language.

From 1994 to 2000, Hemant Vimal Sharma was the Editor of Shanti Dut.

Another history was created when Shanti Dut published it largest Diwali issue of nearly 400 pages in the late 90's under the editorship of Hemant Vimal Sharma.

Shanti Dut is also circulated is Australia, New Zealand, United States, Canada.
