= Samresan Pillay =

Fijian politician (born 1941)

Member of House of Representatives (Fiji) Tavua/Vaileka Indian Communal Constituency
- In office 1987–1987
- Succeeded by: Constitution abrogated

Personal details
- Born: 1941 (age 84–85) Panang, Ra, Fiji
- Party: National Federation Party
- Profession: Soldier, Teacher

Samresan Pillay (born 1941) is a former Fiji Indian soldier and teacher who has also been a member of the House of Representatives of Fiji.

He was born in Panang, Ra, Fiji and is the son of former National Federation Party parliamentarian and President, Ram Sami Goundar. After working for the Department of Agriculture, he joined the British Army in 1961. He left the army in 1969, returned to Fiji, and completed a Diploma in Education from the University of the South Pacific.

For the 1987 general election, the NFP–Labour Coalition chose him as a candidate for the Tavua/Vaileka Indian Communal Constituency, which he won easily, but he was a member of Parliament for a month when the military coup of 1987 put a halt to his political career.
