= Nausori Naitasiri (Open Constituency, Fiji) =

Former electoral constituency in Fiji

Nausori Naitasiri Open is supposedly a former electoral division of Fiji, one of 25 open constituencies that were elected by universal suffrage (the remaining 46 seats, called communal constituencies, were allocated by ethnicity). Established by the 1997 Constitution, it came into being in 1999 and was used for the parliamentary elections of 1999, 2001, and 2006. It was located to the north of Suva.

The 2013 Constitution promulgated by the Military-backed interim government abolished all constituencies and established a form of proportional representation, with the entire country voting as a single electorate.

== Election results ==
In the following tables, the primary vote refers to first-preference votes cast. The final vote refers to the final tally after votes for low-polling candidates have been progressively redistributed to other candidates according to pre-arranged electoral agreements (see electoral fusion), which may be customized by the voters (see instant run-off voting).

=== 1999 ===
Candidate	Political party	Votes (primary)	%	Votes (final)	%
Lavenia Padarath	Fiji Labour Party (FLP)	5,106	37.87	9,290	50.04
Mirdula Sainath	National Federation Party (NFP)	4,044	30.00	4,123	30.58
Lepani Tagicakibau	Fijian Association Party (FAP)	1,630	12.09	2,612	19.37
Vilikesa Mocelutu	Christian Democratic Alliance (VLV)	1,729	12.82	...	...
Ledua Vereti	Nationalist Vanua Tako Lavo Party (NVTLP)	804	5.96	...	...
Sitiveni Kinikini	Soqosoqo ni Vakavulewa ni Taukei (SVT)	169	1.25	...	...
Total		13,482	100.00	13,482	100.00

=== 2001 ===
Candidate	Political party	Votes (primary)	%	Votes (final)	%
Asaeli Masilaca	Soqosoqo Duavata ni Lewenivanua (SDL)	4,095	34.33	6,740	56.92
Lavinia Padarath	Fiji Labour Party (FLP)	4,936	41.37	5,140	43.08
Chengaiya Naidu	National Federation Party (NFP)	1,000	8.38	...	...
Lasarusa Yehuda Ben-Zion Sovea	Conservative Alliance (CAMV)	945	7.92	...	...
Loraini Tulele	Nationalist Vanua Tako Lavo Party (NVTLP)	549	4.60	...	...
Nemani Valucava Buresova	Soqosoqo ni Vakavulewa ni Taukei (SVT)	405	3.39	...	...
Total		11,930	100.00	11,930	100.00

=== 2006 ===
Candidate	Political party	Votes (primary)	%	Votes (final)	%
Asaeli Masilaca	Soqosoqo Duavata ni Lewenivanua (SDL)	7,723	48.84	8,298	52.48
Lavinia Padarath	Fiji Labour Party (FLP)	6,935	43.86	7,515	47.52
Joasia Gucake	National Alliance Party (NAPF)	584	3.69	...	...
Peter Anuresh Chand	National Federation Party (NFP)	485	3.07	...	...
Lasarusa Yehuda Ben-Zion Sovea	Independent	86	0.54	...	...
Total		11,930	100.00	15,813	100.00

== Sources ==
- Psephos - Adam Carr's electoral archive
- Fiji Facts
