= Ami Chand =

Fijian politician

Member of House of Representatives (Fiji) Ba West Indian Communal Constituency
- In office 1999–2001
- Preceded by: None (new constitution)
- Succeeded by: Ahmed Gaffar

Personal details
- Party: Fiji Labour Party

Ami Chand is a Fiji Indian politician who won the Ba West Indian Communal Constituency, one of the 19 seats reserved for Fiji citizens of Indian origin, for the Fiji Labour Party during the 1999 elections for the House of Representatives.

On 19 May 2000, he was among the 43 members of the People's Coalition Government, led by Mahendra Chaudhry, taken hostage by George Speight and his band of rebel Republic of Fiji Military Forces (RFMF) soldiers from the Counter Revolutionary Warfare Unit. He was released on 21 May 2000, after he signed a paper resigning his seat in Parliament.
