= Ba West (Indian Communal Constituency, Fiji) =

Former electoral constituency in Fiji

Ba West Indian Communal is a former electoral division of Fiji, one of 19 communal constituencies reserved for Indo-Fijians. Established by the 1997 Constitution, it came into being in 1999 and was used for the parliamentary elections of 1999, 2001, and 2006. (Of the remaining 52 seats, 27 were reserved for other ethnic communities and 25, called Open Constituencies, were elected by universal suffrage). The electorate covered the western part of Ba Province.

The 2013 Constitution promulgated by the Military-backed interim government abolished all constituencies and established a form of proportional representation, with the entire country voting as a single electorate.

== Election results ==
In the following tables, the primary vote refers to first-preference votes cast. The final vote refers to the final tally after votes for low-polling candidates have been progressively redistributed to other candidates according to pre-arranged electoral agreements (see electoral fusion), which may be customized by the voters (see instant run-off voting).

=== 1999 ===
Candidate	Party	Votes	%
Ami Chand	Labour	5,545	65.58
Vinod Patel	NFP	2,910	34.42
Total		8,455	100.00
Registered voters/turnout		8,455	–
Labour win			

=== 2001 ===
Candidate	Party	Votes	%
Gaffar Ahmed	Labour	5,538	70.56
Vinod Patel	NFP	2,164	27.57
Keshwan Nair	NLUP	147	1.87
Total		7,849	100.00
Registered voters/turnout		7,849	–
Labour hold			

=== 2006 ===
Candidate	Party	Votes	%
Narendra Padarath	Labour	7,229	87.32
Farouk Janeman	NFP	870	10.51
Maden Sen	SDL	180	2.17
Total		8,279	100.00
Registered voters/turnout		8,279	–
Labour hold			

== Sources ==
- Psephos - Adam Carr's electoral archive
- Fiji Facts
