= Isireli Tuvuki =

Fijian politician

Member of the Fijian Parliament for Bua Macuata West Open
- In office 1 September 2001 – 13 May 2006
- Preceded by: Manoa Bale
- Succeeded by: Josefa Dimuri

Isireli Tuvuki is a former Fijian politician, who served in the Cabinet from 2001 to 2006 as Assistant Minister for Agriculture, Sugar, and Land Resettlement. In these roles, he assisted Ilaitia Tuisese, who held these portfolios.

Tuvuki contested the Vanua Levu-based Bua Macuata West Open Constituency for the Soqosoqo Duavata ni Lewenivanua Party (SDL) in the parliamentary election of September 2001. He came in third, behind Ratu Josefa Dimuri of the Conservative Alliance (CAMV) and Evia Varani Sailo of the Fiji Labour Party (FLP), but Fiji's voting system (which combined elements of instant run-off voting and electoral fusion) resulted in enough votes cast for low-polling candidates to be transferred to Tuvuki to give him 52.3 percent of the vote on the final count. He was subsequently appointed to the Cabinet.

Tuvuki effectively retired at the general election held on 6–13 May 2006. He did in fact contest the election, but made only a token bid to retain his seat, as the SDL had selected Ratu Josefa Dimuri as its main candidate. Dimuri was duly elected.

An agricultural officer by profession, Tuvuki served all over Fiji before returning to serve in Nabouwalu, Bua just before his retirement. Tuvuki has been a member of the Fiji Pine Limited Board since the mid-1990s. He is originally from Namuavoivoi village, where his clan leases land to Fiji Pine Limited for the planting of pine. Tuvuki has been vocal in opposing the construction of the Tropik Wood Port in Wairiki, Bua saying that the port should be constructed at Lekutu - closer to the Fiji Pine Limited station in the province.
