= Pravin Singh =

Fijian politician (1855–2003)

Member of House of Representatives (Fiji) Tavua Open Constituency
- In office 1999–2003

Personal details
- Born: 21 August 1955 Tavua, Fiji
- Died: 2 September 2003 (aged 48) Lautoka, Fiji
- Party: Fiji Labour Party

Pravin Singh (August 21, 1955 - September 2, 2003) was a Fijian politician of Indian descent, who won the Tavua Open Constituency in the House of Representatives for the Fiji Labour Party (FLP) in the parliamentary elections of 1999 and 2001.

On 19 May 2000, he was among the 43 members of the People's Coalition Government, led by Mahendra Chaudhry, taken hostage by George Speight and his band of rebel Republic of Fiji Military Forces (RFMF) soldiers from the Counter Revolutionary Warfare Unit. He was released on 21 May 2000, after he signed a paper resigning his seat in Parliament.

In 2003, Singh was offered the portfolio of Minister for State Properties, together with 13 other FLP parliamentarians who were offered cabinet positions by the Prime Minister, Laisenia Qarase but the FLP refused to accept this offer.

Singh was killed in an automobile accident on September 2, 2003, at the age of 48, and was succeeded as the Tavua Open MP by Damodaran Nair, also of the FLP.
