= Satendra Nandan =

Fijian politician

Minister of Health and Social Welfare
- In office 1987 – 14 May 1987

Member of the Fijian Parliament for Suva Rural Indian
- In office 11 April 1987 – 14 May 1987
- Succeeded by: None (Constitution abrogated)

Member of the Fijian Parliament for Nasinu - Vunidawa Indian
- In office 17 July 1982 – 11 April 1987
- Succeeded by: James Shankar Singh

Personal details
- Born: Nadi, Fiji
- Party: National Federation Party; Fiji Labour Party
- Profession: Academic

Satendra Nandan is an Indo-Fijian academic, writer, and former politician. He is one of Fiji's leading writers.

== Early life ==
Nandan was born in Nadi, Fiji. After completing his secondary education he studied at Delhi University, from where he obtained his degree in engineering. He subsequently obtained a master of Arts from the University of Leeds and a PhD from Australian National University. He taught at various schools in India, including the all-boys' boarding school The Doon School in Dehradun. He joined the University of the South Pacific in Suva, Fiji in 1969.

== Political career ==
Nandan was first elected to the House of Representatives of Fiji as a National Federation Party candidate at the 1982 Fijian general election. He was appointed to Sidiq Koya's shadow cabinet as education spokesperson, but resigned in 1985 as the National Federation Party began to fragment. He subsequently resigned from the party and became an independent. He contested the 1987 election as a candidate for the Fiji Labour Party, and was re-elected. He was appointed Minister of Health, Social Welfare and Women's Affairs in the government of Timoci Bavadra, but was removed from office by the 1987 Fijian coups d'état.

== Later life ==
After the 1987 coup, he migrated to Australia and took up a position at the Australian National University in Canberra. He worked as a professor of literature and director of the Centre for Writing. He returned to Fiji in 2005, where he helped establish the University of Fiji.

Following the 2006 Fijian coup d'état he was appointed as interim chair of the military regime's Media Industry Development Authority, but withdrew for health reasons. In 2012 he was appointed to the Constitutional Commission which drafted the 2013 Constitution of Fiji.

== Publications ==
- Nandan, Satendra P. (2018). 1987: Six Nights in May - Death in Paradise. Suva, Fiji: USP Press. ISBN 978-9-82010-984-1. OCLC 1088425955. 0-85174-111-8.
- Nandan (2001). Requiem for a rainbow : a Fijian Indian story. Pacific Indian Publications, Canberra. ISBN 0-64641-589-1. OCLC 1057994370.
- Nandan, Satendra P. (1991). Faces in a village : poetry from Fiji. Adelaide: Pacific Indian Publications. OCLC 946490038.
- Nandan, Satendra P. (1977). Lines across black waters. Adelaide: Centre for Research in the New Literatures in English. ISBN 0-85174-111-8. OCLC 38816534.
- Nandan, Satendra P. (2000). Faces in a village: Poetry from Fiji. Sydney.
- Nandan, Kavita (2005). Stolen Worlds: Fijiindian Fragments. Ivy Press International. ISBN 0-9757223-0-1.
