= Navin Maharaj =

Member of House of Representatives (Fiji) Suva National Constituency
- In office 1987–1987
- Preceded by: Mohammed Ramzan

Minister for Trade, Industry and Tourism
- In office 1987–1987

Personal details
- Born: 1939 (age 86–87) Nadi, Fiji
- Party: Alliance Party, National Federation Party, Fiji Labour Party
- Profession: Businessman
- He was Lord Mayor of Suva for two terms.

Navin Maharaj (born 1939) is a Fiji Indian businessman, former mayor of Suva and member of the House of Representatives of Fiji.

He is the son of one of the first three Indian members of the Legislative Council of Fiji, James Ramchandar Maharaj, and was born in Nadi. After working for 16 years for a well established construction company, he started his own company.

He served two terms as Lord Mayor of Suva, first with the Alliance Party, then with the National Federation Party (NFP) and finally as an independent.

He later rejoined the NFP, and in the 1987 general election was elected to the House of Representatives from the Suva National Constituency as a member of the National Federation Party - Fiji Labour Party coalition. He was the Minister for Trade, Industry and Tourism in the month-long Bavadra government deposed by Sitiveni Rabuka.

He subsequently joined the Fiji Labour Party (FLP) and served as its general secretary during the 1992 general election.

Following the 2000 coup, FLP leader Mahendra Chaudhry accused Maharaj of trying to split the FLP and he subsequently left the party.
