= Nasinu Rewa (Open Constituency, Fiji) =

Former electoral constituency in Fiji

Nasinu Rewa Open is a former electoral division of Fiji, one of 25 open constituencies that were elected by universal suffrage (the remaining 46 seats, called communal constituencies, were allocated by ethnicity). Established by the 1997 Constitution, it came into being in 1999 and was used for the parliamentary elections of 1999, 2001, and 2006. It was located to the north of Suva.

The 2013 Constitution promulgated by the Military-backed interim government abolished all constituencies and established a form of proportional representation, with the entire country voting as a single electorate.

== Election results ==
In the following tables, the primary vote refers to first-preference votes cast. The final vote refers to the final tally after votes for low-polling candidates have been progressively redistributed to other candidates according to pre-arranged electoral agreements (see electoral fusion), which may be customized by the voters (see instant run-off voting).

=== 1999 ===
Candidate	Political party	Votes (primary)	%	Votes (final)	%
John Ali	Fiji Labour Party (FLP)	6,185	43.07	8,277	50.68
Harnam Singh Golian	National Federation Party (NFP)	3,920	27.30	3,970	27.65
Apenai Turaganikeli	Nationalist Vanua Tako Lavo Party (NVTLP)	1,785	12.43	1,825	12.71
Peniasi Silatolu	Christian Democratic Alliance (VLV)	1,178	8.20	1,287	8.96
Tiko Liesa Via	Fijian Association Party (FAP)	1,161	8.09	...	...
Atunaisa Druavesi	Soqosoqo ni Vakavulewa ni Taukei (SVT)	131	0.91	...	...
Total		14,359	100.00	14,359	100.00

=== 2001 ===
Candidate	Political party	Votes (primary)	%	Votes (final)	%
Peniasi Silatolu	Soqosoqo Duavata ni Lewenivanua (SDL)	3,398	26.11	6,652	51.11
John Ali	Fiji Labour Party (FLP)	5,900	45.34	6,362	48.89
Navitalai Ratukalou	Conservative Alliance (CAMV)	1,750	13.45	...	...
Mohammed Sadiq Hussain	National Federation Party (NFP)	1,132	8.70	...	...
Jeremaia Koroijiuta	New Labour Unity Party (NLUP)	484	3.72	...	...
Sheela Bajpai	Soqosoqo ni Vakavulewa ni Taukei (SVT)	313	2.41	...	...
Anil Kumar Sharma	Fijian Association Party (FAP)	37	0.28	...	...
Total		13,014	100.00	13,014	100.00

=== 2006 ===
Candidate	Political party	Votes (primary)	%	Votes (final)	%
Azim Hussein	Fiji Labour Party (FLP)	8,611	48.87	9,436	53.56
John Ali	Soqosoqo Duavata ni Lewenivanua (SDL)	5,188	29.45	8,179	46.44
Pita Tagicakiverata	Soqosoqo Duavata ni Lewenivanua (SDL)	1,664	9.44	...	...
Mohammed Sadiq Hussain	National Federation Party (NFP)	1,132	6.42	...	...
Seru Serevi	Independent	845	4.80	...	...
Indar Deo	National Alliance Party (NAPF)	748	4.25	...	...
Priscilla Singh	National Federation Party (NFP)	563	3.20	...	...
Total		17,619	100.00	17,619	100.00

== Sources ==
- Psephos - Adam Carr's electoral archive
- Fiji Facts
