= Jainendra =

Jainendra is a masculine given name. Notable people with that name include the following:

== Given names ==
- Jainendra Jain (screenwriter) (1939–2007), Indian film writer, director and producer
- Jainendra K. Jain, Indian physicist
- Jainendra Kumar (1905–1988), Indian writer
- Jainendra Kumar (Fiji), Fijian politician
