= Narendra Kumar Padarath =

Fijian politician

Narendra Kumar Padarath is a Fiji Indian politician who won the Ba West Indian Communal Constituency for the Labour Party in 2006 general election.

He is the President of the Poultry Industry Association of Fiji.
