= Magodro (Open Constituency, Fiji) =

Former electoral constituency of Fuji

Magodro Open is a former electoral division of Fiji, one of 25 open constituencies that were elected by universal suffrage (the remaining 46 seats, called communal constituencies, were allocated by ethnicity). Established by the 1997 Constitution, it came into being in 1999 and was used for the parliamentary elections of 1999, 2001, and 2006. It was located in Ba Province, in the west of the main island of Viti Levu.

The 2013 Constitution promulgated by the Military-backed interim government abolished all constituencies and established a form of proportional representation, with the entire country voting as a single electorate.

== Election results ==
In the following tables, the primary vote refers to first-preference votes cast. The final vote refers to the final tally after votes for low-polling candidates have been progressively redistributed to other candidates according to pre-arranged electoral agreements (see electoral fusion), which may be customized by the voters (see instant run-off voting).

In the 2001 election, Gyan Singh won with more than 50 percent of the primary vote; therefore, there was no redistribution of preferences.

=== 1999 ===
Candidate	Political party	Votes (primary)	%	Votes (final)	%
Jag Narain Sharma	Fiji Labour Party (FLP)	6,968	46.30	9,940	66.05
Shiu Charan Singh	National Federation Party (NFP)	3,927	26.09	5,109	33.95
Steven Pradeep Singh	Party of National Unity (PANU)	2,538	16.86	...	...
Epeli Navatoga	Soqosoqo ni Vakavulewa ni Taukei (SVT)	1,169	7.77	...	...
Mosese Tuki Yasa	Christian Democratic Alliance	447	2.97	...	...
Total		15,049	100.00	15,049	100.00

=== 2001 ===
Candidate	Political party	Votes	%
Gyan Singh	Fiji Labour Party (FLP)	7,451	56.88
Vijay Lal	National Federation Party (NFP)	3,212	24.52
Josaia Driso	Soqosoqo Duavata ni Lewenivanua (SDL)	2,463	18.60
Total		13,099	100.00

=== 2006 ===
Candidate	Political party	Votes	%
Gyan Singh	Fiji Labour Party (FLP)	9,000	58.01
Josese Drikalu Botitu	Soqosoqo Duavata ni Lewenivanua (SDL)	3,761	24.24
Davendra Naidu	National Federation Party (NFP)	2,023	13.04
Vijay Lal	National Alliance Party (NAPF)	731	4.71
Total		15,515	100.00

== Sources ==
- Psephos - Adam Carr's electoral archive
- Fiji Facts
