= Gyan Singh (Fijian politician) =

Fijian politician

Gyan Singh is a former Fijian politician of Indian descent, who held the Magodro Open Constituency in the House of Representatives for the Fiji Labour Party in the parliamentary election of 2001, taking almost 57 percent of the votes cast. He retained the seat at the 2006 election with an increased majority.

Singh's career came to an end with the military coup of 5 December 2006.
