= Damodaran Nair =

Fijian politician (1944/1945–2026)

Member of House of Representatives (Fiji) Tavua Open Constituency
- In office 2004–2006
- Preceded by: Pravin Singh
- Succeeded by: vacant

Personal details
- Born: 1944 or 1945
- Died: c. 16 September 2026 (aged 81)
- Party: Fiji Labour Party

Damodaran Nair (1944 or 1945 – c. 16 September 2026) was a Fijian politician and lawyer, who held the Tavua Open Constituency in the House of Representatives for the Fiji Labour Party (FLP) in a by-election on 17 January 2004 following the death of the incumbent, Pravin Singh, in an automobile collision in late 2003. Nair was re-elected in the May 2006 parliamentary election. His parliamentary career was ended by the military coup of 5 December 2006.

In January 2009, Nair appealed for help for people from the district of Tavua affected by severe flooding.

Nair was of Indian descent. On 16 September 2026, it was announced that he had died at the age of 81.
