= Govind Swamy =

Fijian politician

Member of House of Representatives (Fiji) Vanua Levu North and West National Constituency
- In office 1987–1987
- Preceded by: Dr Santa Singh

Personal details
- Born: 1951 (age 74–75) Labasa, Fiji
- Party: Fiji Labour Party
- Profession: Teacher

Govind Swamy (born 1951) is a Fiji Indian who was a teacher for many years before being elected to the House of Representatives of Fiji.

He was born in Labasa and after qualifying as an industrial arts teacher taught for eighteen years. In 1987 he resigned from his teaching position to contest the Vanua Levu North and West National Constituency for the NFP–Labour Coalition. He won the seat with a comfortable margin, but was a member of Parliament for a month when the military coup of 1987 prematurely ended his political career.
