= Jain Kumar =

Fijian civil servant and former politician

Member of House of Representatives (Fiji) Ba East Indian Communal Constituency
- In office 2006–2006
- Preceded by: Satendra Singh
- Succeeded by: vacant

Personal details
- Party: Fiji Labour Party
- Profession: Farmer, Trade unionist
- In 2007 he was elected the chairman of the Fiji Cane Growers Council

Jain Kumar (born 1959) is a Fijian civil servant and former politician of Indian descent. He was elected the Chairman of Sugar Cane Growers Council of Fiji on 19 January 2007. He replaced Vijendra Autar who had been sacked by the military together with Jagannath Sami and eight board members appointed by the deposed government.

Kumar was previously the Vice Chairman of the Council and is the President of the National Farmers Union. He was elected to the House of Representatives in the 2006 elections from the Ba East Indian Communal Constituency on the Fiji Labour Party ticket.
