= Farouk Janeman =

Fijian footballer (1953–2013)

Mohammed Farouk Bhamji (Janeman) (17 February 1953 – 27 September 2013) was a Fijian football player and coach.

== Career ==
A forward, Janeman was a star soccer player representing the premier Fiji Football Association team of Ba in the 1970s. After his retirement as a player, he took up coaching, and led a number of district and national sides. In the 2006 elections Janeman contested the Ba West Indian Communal Constituency as a National Federation Party candidate and obtained only 10.51% of the votes.

== Achievement as a soccer player ==
- He was the captain of the Ba team that defeated Rewa in the 1976 Interdistrict Competition.
- He scored the lone goal when Ba defeated Suva in the 1977 Interdistrict Competition.
- He scored the decisive goal when Ba defeated Labasa in the 1978 Interdistrict Competition.
- Member of Ba soccer team's 1977 tour of New Zealand. played for Fiji national team for 11 years.

== Soccer teams coached by Janeman ==
- Coach of national under fifteen team that took part in the Northern Ireland Milk Cup from 18 to 24 July 2004 in Belfast.
- Coach of the Fiji Nation U-12 Team that took part in the Danone Cup in France in 2008 and placed 24th out of 40 countries. The team's name was Flying Arrow S.C. U-12 team as a big part of the support for the team came from the Flying Arrow Sports Club in Surrey, B.C., Canada.
- Coach of Fiji team to Oceania Football Confederation Under 17 Championship in Tahiti from 20 to 24 March 2007.
- Assistant coach of Fiji national teams tour of the United States from 1 to 19 April 2007.
- He is the FIJI Football Association development manager. he is ba teams head coach
