= Vinod Patel =

Fijian politician (1939–2024)

Vinod Shankarbhai Patel

Member of House of Representatives (Fiji); Ba Urban Indian Communal Constituency
- In office 1992–1999

Personal details
- Born: 28 February 1939 Ba, Colony of Fiji
- Died: 5 January 2024 (aged 84) Lautoka, Fiji
- Party: National Federation Party
- Spouse: Manjulaben Patel
- Profession: Businessman
- He was president of the Ba Football Association from 1986 to 2001

Vinod Shankarbhai Patel (28 February 1939 – 5 January 2024) was a Fiji Indian businessman, football administrator and politician. He was the chairman of Vinod Patel and Company Limited which owns a chain of hardware shops throughout Fiji.

Vinod Patel was a strong supporter of the Ba football team and was their president and Fiji Team director.

Patel entered politics as a councillor in Ba Town Council. He was subsequently elected the mayor and served two successful terms before moving to national politics. He easily won the Ba Urban Indian Communal Constituency for the National Federation Party in the 1992 general election and was reelected in 1994. During the 1999 and 2001 elections he attempted to re-enter Parliament as a member for Ba West Indian Communal Constituency but was easily defeated by the Fiji Labour Party candidate.

Vinod Patel died on 5 January 2024, at the age of 84.

== Awards and achievements ==
Year	Country	Award name	Given by	Field of Merit
2017	Fiji	Pravasi Bharatiya Samman	President of India	social work
