= John Ali =

Fiji Indian politician

Member of House of Representatives (Fiji) Nasinu Rewa Open Constituency
- In office 1999–2000
- Succeeded by: Peniasi Silatolu

Personal details
- Party: Fiji Labour Party, Soqosoqo Duavata ni Lewenivanua

John Ali is a Fiji Indian politician who won the Nasinu Rewa Open Constituency, one of the 25 open seats, for the Fiji Labour Party during the 1999 elections for the House of Representatives.

On 19 May 2000, he was among the 43 members of the People's Coalition Government, led by Mahendra Chaudhry, taken hostage by George Speight and his band of rebel Republic of Fiji Military Forces (RFMF) soldiers from the Counter Revolutionary Warfare Unit. He was released on 21 May 2000, after he signed a paper resigning his seat in Parliament.

He contested the 2001 election as an FLP candidate and lost. He later joined the Soqosoqo Duavata ni Lewenivanua (SDL) of Laisenia Qarase and contested the 2006 as its candidate, again losing the seat.
