= Satendra Singh (politician) =

Fijian politician

Member of House of Representatives (Fiji) Ba East Indian Communal Constituency
- In office 2001–2006
- Preceded by: Gaffar Ahmed
- Succeeded by: Jain Kumar

Personal details
- Party: Fiji Labour Party

Satendra Singh is a former Fijian politician of Indian descent. He represented the Ba East Indian Communal Constituency, one of 19 reserved for Indo-Fijians, which he won for the Fiji Labour Party (FLP) in the parliamentary elections of 2001. Prior to his election, he worked a farm advisor for the Fiji Sugar Corporation.

In 2003, Singh was offered the portfolio of Minister for Environment, together with 13 other FLP parliamentarians who were offered cabinet positions by the Prime Minister, Laisenia Qarase but the FLP refused to accept this offer.

Singh announced on 8 March 2006 that he would probably not contest the general election scheduled for 6–13 May 2006. He wished to pursue further studies abroad, he said, but would reconsider if his party asked him to. The Fiji Times reported on 11 March, however, that he was reconsidering, following a petition from more than 1000 of his constituents. Some had asked him to contest as an independent candidate, he said, but he would wait for the FLP to decide whether to give him the nomination. In the event, he did not contest the election.
