= Gaffar Ahmed =

Fiji Labour Party Fijian politician

Member of House of Representatives (Fiji) Ba West Indian Communal Constituency
- In office 1995–2006
- Succeeded by: Narendra Kumar Padarath

Member of Senate (Fiji) Leader of Opposition's nominee
- In office 2006–2006

Assistant Minister for Home Affairs (Fiji)
- In office 1999–2000

Personal details
- Party: Fiji Labour Party
- Profession: Police Officer

Gaffar Ahmed is a former Fiji Labour Party (FLP) Fijian politician of Indian descent. Ahmed was born in Ba and is a former police officer. He represented the Ba West Indian Communal Constituency, one of 19 reserved for Indo-Fijians, from 1995 to 2006.

Ahmed was Assistant Minister for Home Affairs in the Peoples Coalition Government from 1999 to 2000.

On 19 May 2000, he was among the 43 members of the People's Coalition Government, led by Mahendra Chaudhry, taken hostage by George Speight and his band of rebel Republic of Fiji Military Forces (RFMF) soldiers from the Counter Revolutionary Warfare Unit. He was released on 21 May 2000, after he signed a paper resigning his seat in Parliament.

In 2003, Ahmed was offered the portfolio of Minister for Prisons, together with 13 other FLP parliamentarians who were offered cabinet positions by the Prime Minister, Laisenia Qarase but the FLP refused to accept this offer.

Earlier, he had expressed his intention to contest the Magodro Open Constituency in the House of Representatives, but announced his withdrawal on 11 April 2006, citing financial difficulties but was appointed to the Senate as one of eight nominees of the Leader of the Opposition.

Ahmed is a life member of Fiji Football Referees Association and held a FIFA referees badge from 1991 to 1995.
