= Lavenia Padarath =

Fijian politician (died 2019)

Lavenia Padarath (née Wainiqolo; 1944/1945 – July 14, 2019) was a Fijian politician. She was President of the Fiji Labour Party from 2015 to 2019.

Padarath won the Nausori Naitasiri Open Constituency for the Fiji Labour Party (FLP) in the 1999 parliamentary election. She was subsequently appointed to the Cabinet of Prime Minister Mahendra Chaudhry as Minister for Women, Culture, and Social Welfare. Along with many other parliamentarians, she was kidnapped by gunmen led by George Speight and held hostage at the parliamentary complex during the civilian coup d'état of 2000.

Padarath lost her seat in the House of Representatives in the general election of 2001, and failed to regain it in the 2006 election, but was appointed to the Senate as one of nine nominees of the Leader of the Opposition. She served in the Senate until it was closed one day after the military coup of 5 December 2006.

== Personal life ==
Padarath, an indigenous Fijian, was married to an Indo-Fijian. Her son, Ben Padarath, also contested the 2006 election, but as a candidate of the National Alliance Party of Fiji. Padarath publicly criticized her son for saying that political power should remain in indigenous Fijian hands, saying that such comments were racist and contrary to the way he had been brought up.

== Death ==
On 14 July 2019, Padarath died at the age of 74. Her son announced that she died after a short illness.
