= Azim Hussein =

Fijian politician

Member of House of Representatives (Fiji) Nasinu Rewa Open Constituency
- In office 2006–2006
- Preceded by: Peniasi Silatolu
- Succeeded by: vacant (Parliament suspended by military coup)

Personal details
- Party: Fiji Labour Party

Azim Hussein is an Indo-Fijian educationalist and politician who won the Nasinu Rewa Open Constituency for the Labour Party in 2006 general election defeating the John Ali of Soqosoqo Duavata ni Lewenivanua (SDL), who had formerly held the seat as a Labour Party candidate.

Hussein had been a primary school head teacher before joining politics.
