= Antonio Tanaburenisau =

Fijian politician

Antonio Tanaburenisau (born 1948) is a former Fijian politician. He won the Namosi Fijian Communal constituency as a candidate of the Fijian Association Party (FAP) in the general election of 1999.

On 22 April 2005, Tanaburenisau pleaded guilty to charges of having taken an illegal oath of office as a member of the rebel Taukei Cabinet of George Speight on 20 May 2000, during the 2000 Fijian coup d'état. He had been present in the Parliamentary complex, while gunmen led by Speight had forced their way into the complex. He had ignored directions from his party leader, Ratu Tu'uakitau Cokanauto, to leave the building, and instead had participated in discussions that led to the formation of the Taukei Cabinet the next day, with himself as Minister for the Environment.

At a second court appearance on 23 May 2005, he apologized to the coup victims, his constituency, and the nation.

On 16 August, Justice Anthony Gates handed Tanaburenisau a two-year prison sentence, suspended on condition of continued good behaviour.
