= Asaeli Masilaca =

Fijian politician

Asaeli Masilaca is a former Fijian politician and member of the House of Representatives of Fiji.

Originally from Nakini village, Naitasiri, Masilaca returned to his province to contest the 2001 elections after a successful career with the Fiji Sugar Corporation which saw him rise from a mill engineer to mill manager for the Penang Mill in Rakiraki in a span of 30 years.

At the 2001 Fijian general election he was elected in the Nausori Naitasiri Open Constituency as a Soqosoqo Duavata ni Lewenivanua candidate. In May 2005 he claimed that the decline of Fiji's sugar industry was caused by the laziness of farmers. He was narrowly re-elected in the 2006 election, winning the seat on the fourth count. He was removed from office by the 2006 Fijian coup d'état.
