= Mix FM (Fiji) =

Coordinates: 17.6051761°S 177.4586244°E

Lautoka; Fiji
- Frequency: 93.8MHz and 93.6MHz
- Branding: Mix FM

Programming
- Format: Contemporary Variety of Pop/Easy Listening/Oldies/Classic Hits and many more ...

Ownership
- Owner: Pivotal Holdings

History
- First air date: 17 December 2007; 17 years ago

Links
- Webcast: mixfmfiji.com/listen-live/
- Website: mixfmfiji.com

Mix FM is a radio station that serves Fiji, broadcasting on the FM band at the frequencies of 93.8 MHz in Lautoka, Nadi and Suva and 93.6 MHz in Ba, Tavua, Rakiraki and Sigatoka. The station has been licensed to broadcast all over Fiji since 2006. It launched in 2007. It is preferred by older urban populations.

As of 6 February 2011, Mix FM has introduced Radio Data System (RDS) on its 93.8 MHz frequency in the West. RDS for Suva was introduced on 10 February. On 30 June 2011, MixFM changed its frequencies from 94.0 to 93.8 and 88.6 to 93.6 as per Government requirement. On 9 September 2011, MixFM started broadcasting in Sigatoka on 93.6 MHz.

The disc jockey Irshad Hussain (also known as Tukuna Boy O Nadi Ko), who hosted the Saturday Night Hype on Mix FM since its founding, died on 6 September 2018 at the age of 40 after a short illness. AM Kick Show host Michael Faga died at the Lautoka Hospital on 13 September 2021.

== Hosts and Shows ==
Weekdays

Show	Time Slot	Host(s)
AM Kick Show	00:00-06:00	Michael Faga
Morning Fix	06:00-09:00	Joslyne Thaggard
Midday Show	09:00-14:00	Allison Naivalu
Cruise Control	14:00-19:00	Jackson Tuvivi
Night Fall	19:00-00:00	Salanieta Allen (Sefanaia Vakaloloma – Fridays)

Saturday

Show	Time Slot	Host(s)
Midnight Pulse	00:00-06:00	Henry Miller
Saturday Breakfast	06:00-12:00	Rebecca Kubunavanua
Afternoon Chill	12:00-18:00	Virisila Saladuadua
Saturday Night Hype	18:00-00:00	Sefanaia Vakaloloma

Sunday

Show	Time Slot	Host(s)
Midnight Pulse	00:00-06:00	Henry Miller
Peaceful Sunday	06:00-12:00	Rebecca Kubunavanua
Afternoon Cruise	12:00-18:00	Virisila Saladuadua
Easy Evening	18:00-00:00	Salanieta Allen
