= Jainendra Kumar (Fiji) =

Fijian politician

Jainendra Kumar is a Fijian civil servant and political leader of Indian descent. A former director of research in the Agriculture, Sugar and Land Resettlement Ministry, he served as a Rapporteur in the Convention on Biological Diversity in 2002. On 9 January 2007, he was appointed Minister for Agriculture, Fisheries and Forestry and Primary Industries in the interim Cabinet of Commodore Frank Bainimarama. He was removed from office by the military government on 4 January 2008.
