= Josefa Dimuri =

Fijian chief and politician

Ratu Josefa Nalumuialevu Dimuri is a Fijian chief and politician, who served as a Senator from 2001 to 2006, when he was elected to the House of Representatives. Following the election, he was appointed Minister of State for Agriculture, Alternative Livelihood, and Outer Island Development.

== Political career ==
A former Fiji Times journalist, Dimuri was appointed Minister of Information by the Rabuka government in 1993. He contested the Macuata Fijian Communal Constituency on behalf of then-Prime Minister Sitiveni Rabuka's political party, the Soqosoqo ni Vakavulewa ni Taukei (SVT), but was defeated by the Christian Democratic Alliance candidate, Poseci Bune. In 2001, he contested the Bua-Macuata West Open Constituency, this time as a candidate of the newly formed Conservative Alliance (CAMV), and lost again. The Macuata Provincial Council, however, chose Dimuri to represent the province in the Senate. According to the non-defunct 1997 Constitution, fourteen Senators were chosen by the Great Council of Chiefs, but in practice the Great Council chose to delegate this prerogative to Fiji's fourteen provincial councils, each of which chose one Senator.

In April 2005 he was sentenced to eight months imprisonment over his role in the Sukanaivalu Barracks mutiny. He was released to serve his sentence extramurally after only 11 days, and subsequently allowed to return to his seat in parliament.

He was elected in an open seat at the 2006 election. He lost his seat following the 2006 Fijian coup d'état.
