= NFP–Labour Coalition =

NFP–Labour Coalition was the coalition of the National Federation Party and Fiji Labour Party under the leadership of Timoci Bavadra, formed in 1987 to contest that year's general election. The coalition won the election with 28 seats in the House of Representatives to the Alliance Party's 24 seats, ending the Alliance Party's 21-year rule in Fiji. In April 1987, swearing in of the Fiji Labour Party and NFP coalition Government Ministers took place. Some prominent names were (Senator) Jai Ram Reddy – Attorney General, Finance Minister – Mahendra Chaudhry, Education Minister – Dr. Tupeni Baba, Foreign Affairs Minister – Krishna Datt etc. There was a real optimism in the country and the majority of people were looking forward to the new Government carrying out its policies of social justice and good governance but the government lasted only a month when it was deposed by the military coup of 1987.

== See also ==
- Elections in Fiji
- Politics of Fiji
