= Timoci Bavadra =

Fijian medical doctor and politician (1934–1989)

The Right Honourable Timoci Bavadra
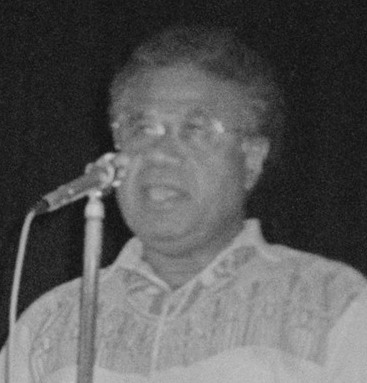
- Bavadra in 1988

2nd Prime Minister of Fiji
- In office 13 April – 14 May 1987
- Monarch: Elizabeth II
- Governor-General: Sir Penaia Ganilau
- Deputy: Harish Sharma
- Preceded by: Sir Kamisese Mara
- Succeeded by: Sir Kamisese Mara

1st Leader of the Labour Party
- In office 1985–1989
- Preceded by: Position established
- Succeeded by: Kuini Speed

Personal details
- Born: 22 September 1934 Lautoka, Fiji Colony
- Died: 3 November 1989 (aged 55) Lautoka, Fiji
- Cause of death: Cancer
- Party: Labour
- Spouse: Kuini Speed

Timoci Uluivada Bavadra (22 September 1934 – 3 November 1989) was a Fijian medical doctor who founded the Fiji Labour Party and served as the prime minister of Fiji for one month in 1987.

== Personal life ==
Bavadra was born in Viseisei, Colony of Fiji on 22 September 1934. He was married to Adi Kuini Teimumu Vuikaba Latianara, and stepfather to Tupou Draunidalo who would later become a well known politician and lawyer.

=== Illness and death ===
Timoci had been fighting advanced spinal cancer for much of 1989. He spent 8 weeks undergoing extensive radiotherapy treatment for his spine in Auckland, New Zealand. After doctors determined the treatment was no longer effective, he was confined to a wheelchair and returned home to Fiji on 1 November 1989, to spend his final hours among family and supporters in Viseisei. He finally passed on Friday, 3 November 1989 surrounded by loved ones.

=== Funeral ===
His family and village elders turned down an offer for an official state funeral from the military-backed government that had ousted him in 1997. A spokesmen said that saying yes to a state funeral would mean military presence at the funeral which was the last thing Timoci wanted.

An estimated 60,000 people turned up to his Reguregu and funeral which was held on Wednesday, 8 November 1989.

== Education and medical career ==
Timoci completed his secondary education at Queen Victoria School. He then went to attend the Fiji School of Medcine and earned a diploma in public gealth from the University of Otago. He then went on to work in the Fiji Ministry of Health.

Bavadra rose through the Ministry of Health to become the national head of Fiji's Primary Health Care Program. In this role, he traveled extensively across rural villages and settlements, expanding local clinics, preventive medicine, maternal care, and public sanitation initiatives.

His hands-on role in public health earned him high standing among health workers, leading to his election as president of the Fiji Public Service Associaton in 1978. He held this influential union leadership role until he held this influential union leadership role until he retired from the civil service in 1985 to establish the Fiji Labour Party..

== Political career ==
Timoci was appointed president and leader of the newly formed Fiji Labour Party in July of 1985. The party was formed by Fiji's workers unions and associations after the Mara Government had put a national freeze on wages.. He contested in his first election for the North Western Fijian National Constituency. He garnered over 15,000 votes securing a victory and unseating the incumbent Sefanaia Tabua.

His FLP-NFP coalition won the elections winning 28 of the seats, the victory put an end to the Alliance Dominate government and ending the 20 year continuous premiership of Ratu Kamisese Mara.

== 1987 Coup ==
Main Article: Fiji 1987 Coup
