= Lautoka =

Lautoka Lau'toka (Fijian) लौटोका (Hindi)
- City
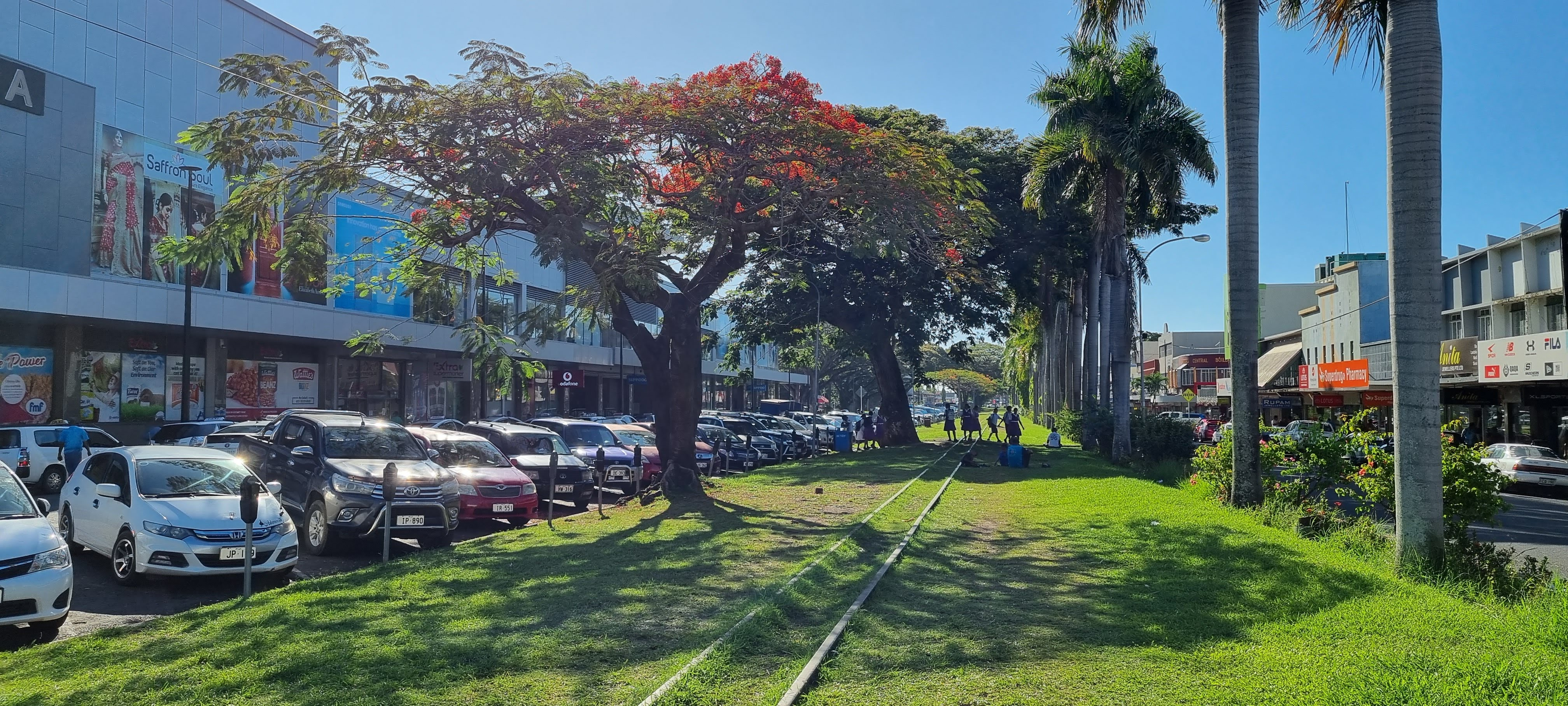
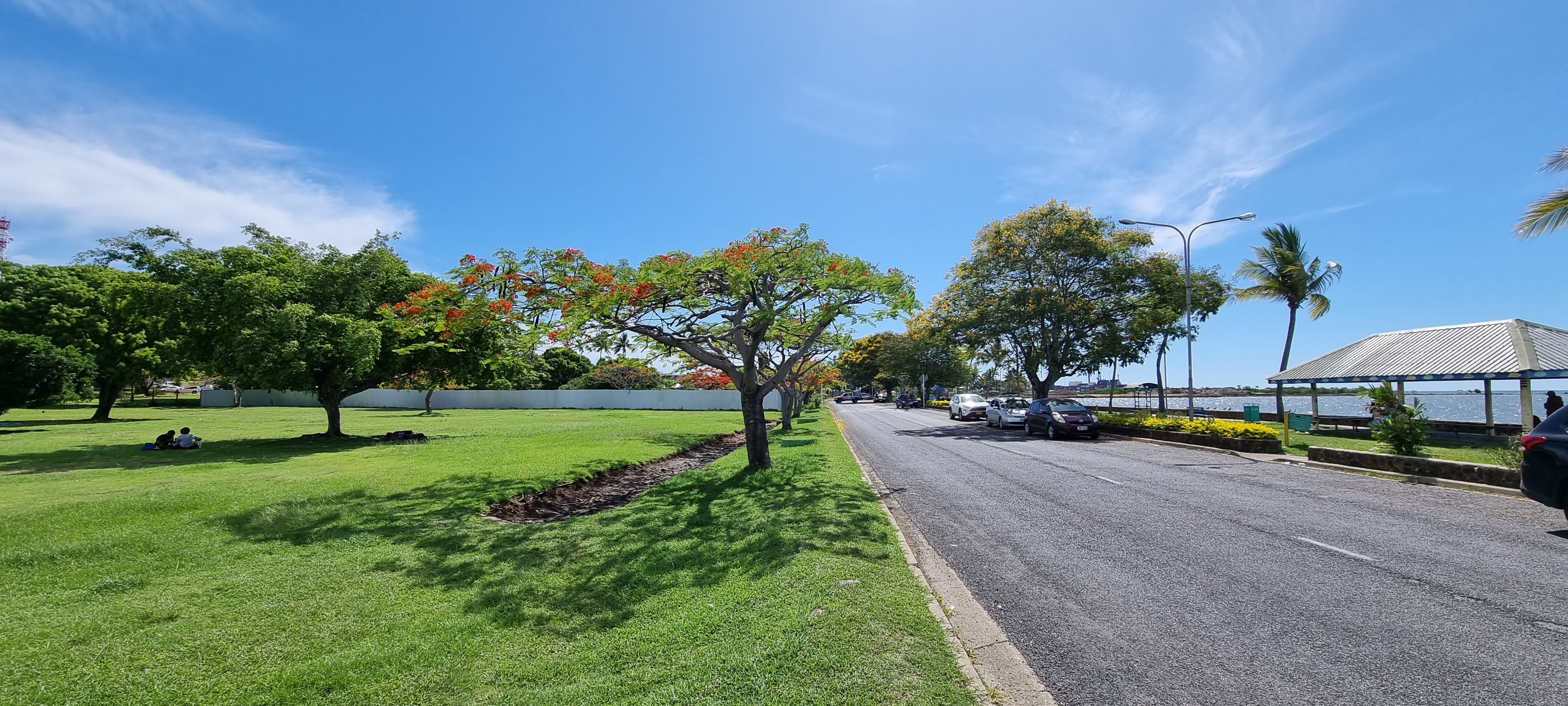
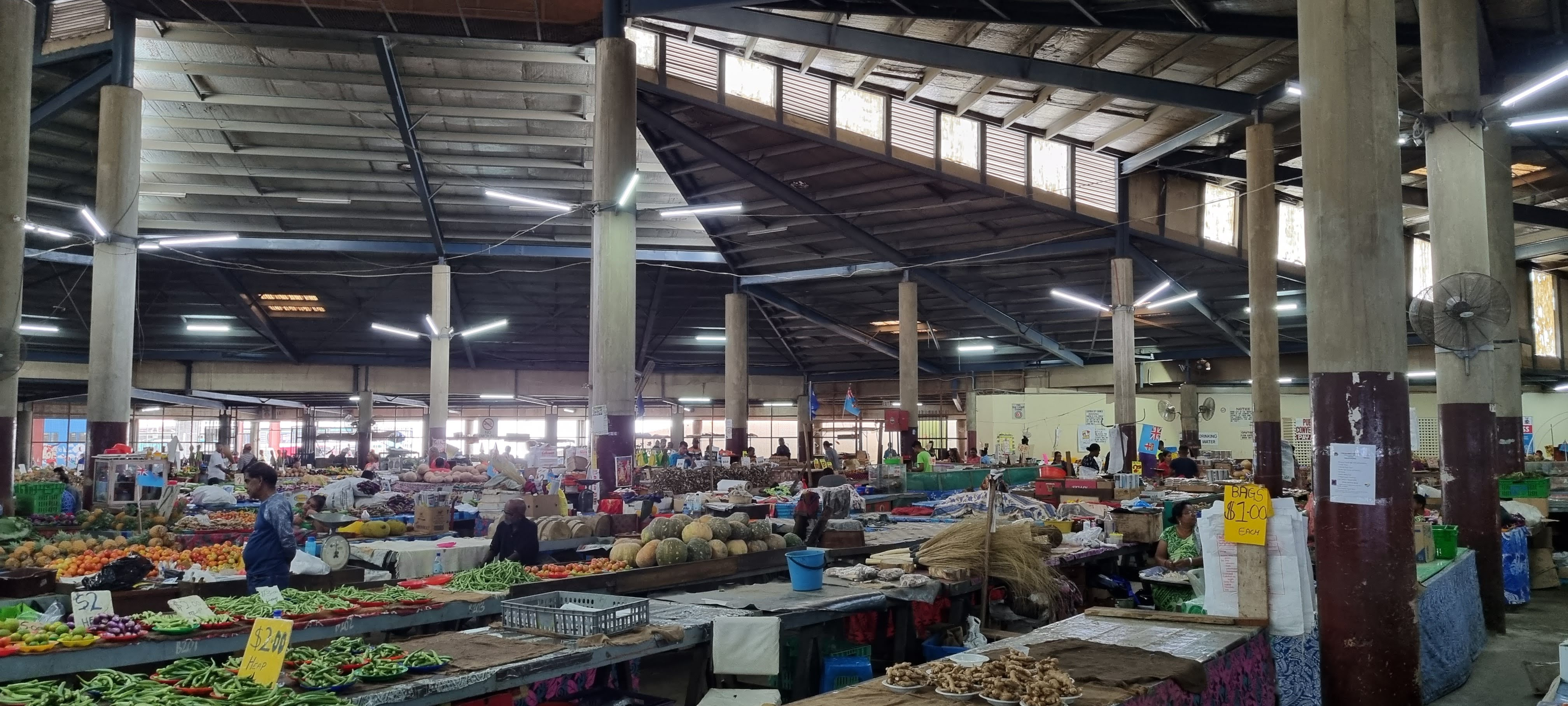
- TappooCity and Vitogo Parade (shopping areas), Marine Drive and Lautoka Market
- Nicknames: Sugar City
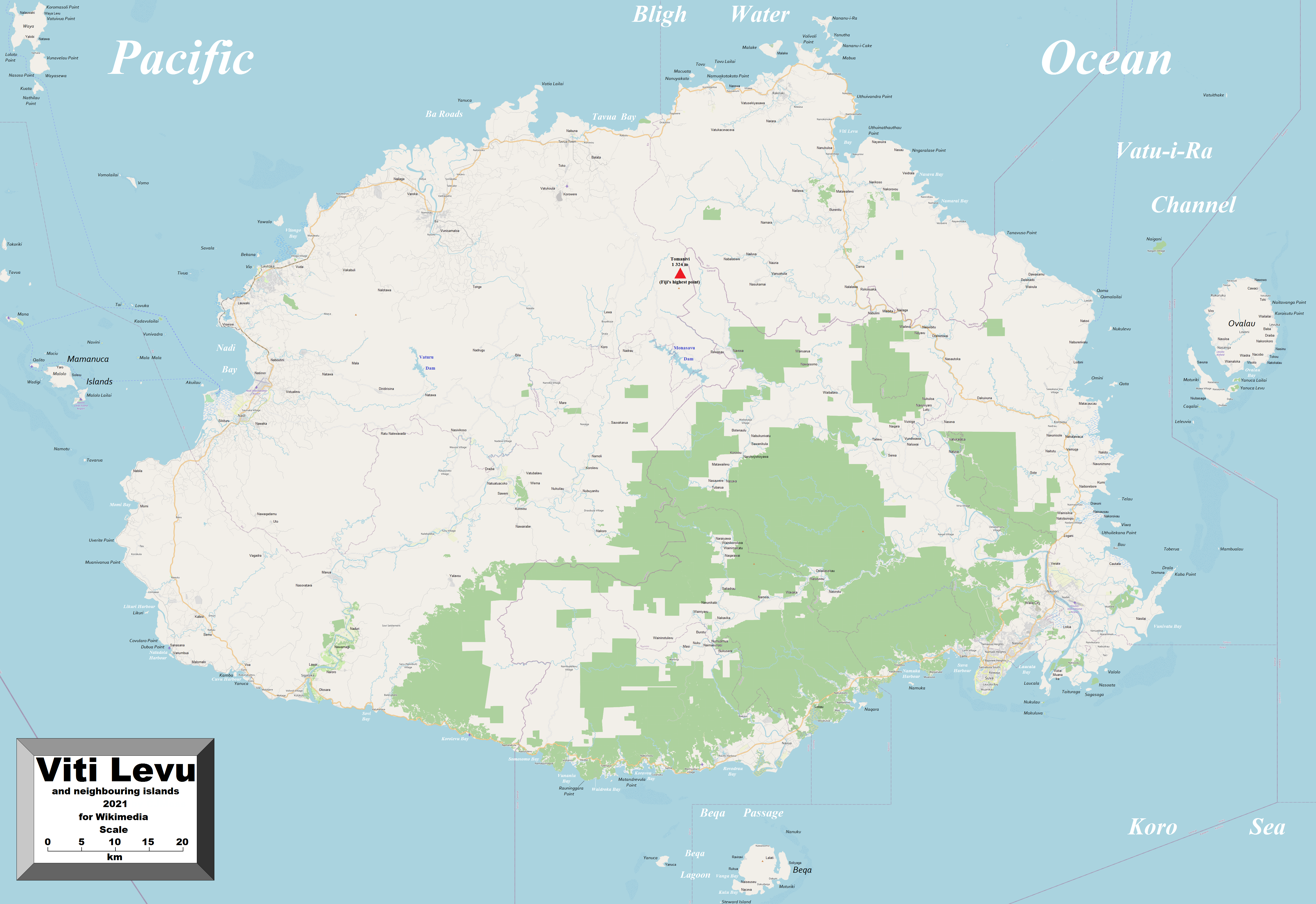
- Viti Levu with Lautoka in the north west

- Location in Fiji
- Country: Fiji
- Island: Viti Levu
- Division: Western Division
- Province: Ba

Population (2017)
  - Total: 71,573
- Time zone: UTC+12 (GMT +12)
  - Summer (DST): UTC+13 (GMT +13)
- Website: www.lautokacitycouncil.com.fj

Lautoka (Fijian pronunciation: [lɔu̯toka], Fiji Hindi: लौटोका) is the second largest metropolitan area in Fiji. It is on the west coast of the island of Viti Levu, in the Ba Province of the Western Division. Lying in the heart of Fiji's sugar cane-growing region, the city has come to be known as the Sugar City. Covering an area of 32 square kilometres, it had a population of 71,573 at the 2017 census, the most recent to date.

== Economic activities ==
Lautoka is known as the Sugar City and the Cane Market because of its sugar cane belt areas. The main Lautoka Sugar Mill was founded in 1903, and is the city's biggest employer by far. Built for the Colonial Sugar Refining Company (Fiji) (CSR) by workers from India and the Solomon Islands between 1899 and 1903, it hires some 1,300 employees today. Other industries include timber milling, garment manufacturing, distillery, brewery, jewellery, blending, steelworks, fishing, hatchery, domestic items, paints, and construction.

== History ==
The name of the city is derived from two Fijian words meaning "spear hit." According to an oral tradition, the name arose following a duel between two chiefs. As one speared the other, he was reported to have cried "Lau-toka!" ("Bull's eye!").

The first known European sighting of the Lautoka area took place on 7 May 1789. Captain William Bligh spotted and roughly charted the coasts of Lautoka while making his epic voyage to Timor, in the wake of the mutiny on the Bounty.

This city is central to sugar cane production in Fiji, and was populated by large numbers of indentured labourers working on the sugar cane plantations from the late 19th century onwards, many having come from India. In some respects, the city maintains a unique cultural identity in Fiji to this day, with a proud musical tradition linked to the early development of jazz.

During World War II, the US Navy built a base at Lautoka as part of Naval Base Fiji.

In 2012, Lautoka was announced as the administration capital of the western division.

== Politics ==
Incorporated as a town in 1929, Lautoka was proclaimed a city on 25 February 1977. It is governed by a 16-member city council, who elect from among themselves a mayor. Lautoka currently does not have a mayor but has a government-appointed administrator like all urban centres in Fiji since the military coup of 2006. The former administrator was Parveen Bala, who was also mayor of Ba.

A well-known past Mayor is Ratilal Patel, who was elected mayor in 1967.

Lautoka is the only city in Fiji's Western Division, and is the industrial hub of Fiji which contains more than 50 percent of the nation's population. It is also the headquarters of the Fiji Electricity Authority, the Fiji Pine Ltd, and the National Marketing Authority.

== Mass media ==
The headquarters and studios of Mix FM Fiji are located in Lautoka. MixFM is the only national English radio station in Fiji to be based outside of Suva.

== Demographics ==
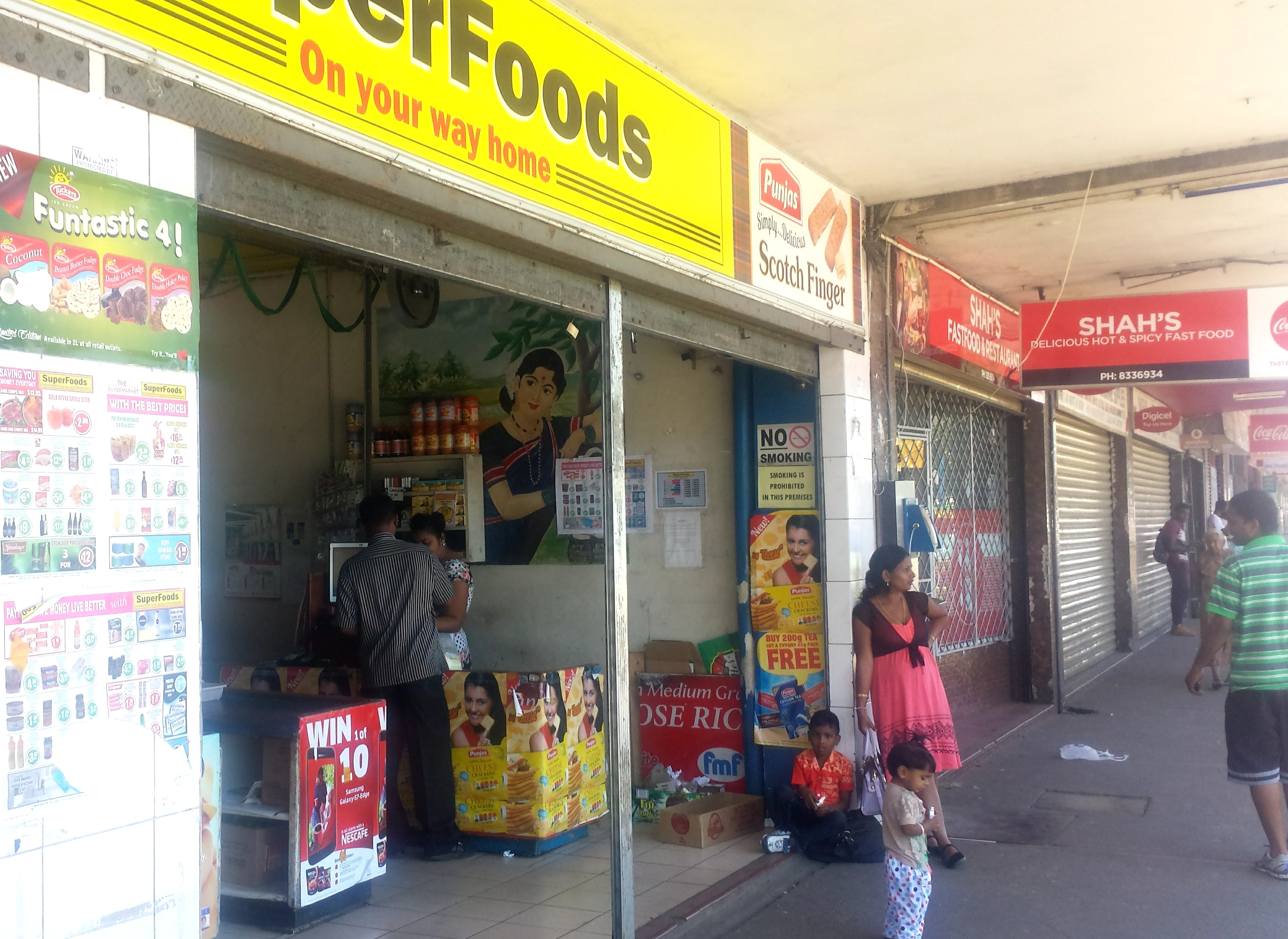
Grocery store in Lautoka.

Since 1970, the population of Lautoka has grown rapidly, and in the last twenty years it has also changed dramatically in structure. In the early 1970s, the population was estimated to be about 12,000, the vast majority of inhabitants being Indian, as would be expected considering the early growth of the city was entirely associated with the sugar industry. Almost all of the present Indian inhabitants are descendants of the early girmityas. In 1986 the population was 39,000 and in 1996 almost 43,000, but it is not clear exactly how the boundaries of the urban area were defined at either of these censuses. In 2005 the population including the suburban zones was probably about 50,000, occupying a total area of about 16 km^{2}. The population of Lautoka including the rural districts is around 80,000. But much of the recent growth of the city itself has been due to indigenous Fijians moving into the urban area.

The city is the birthplace of PGA Tour Hall of Famer Vijay Singh and Ghazal and Tabla star Cassius Khan.

== Health and medical services ==
During the COVID-19 pandemic, the city recorded the first cases of the virus in the country, causing the immediate lockdown of the city in March 2020. The lockdown lasted 18 days, with only essential services allowed to operate and no one allowed to enter or exit the confined area.

In April 2021, the city was yet again the epicentre of another community outbreak and a second lockdown was issued. The lockdown is expected to last one to two months.

== Transport ==
Port of Lautoka is the main maritime gateway for western Viti Levu and is the second largest port in Fiji. The port is mainly used for bulk sugar, molasses, woodchips, petroleum and gas. The port is also used for cruises, including Blue Lagoon Cruises and Nai's Cruises.

Lautoka is served by Pacific Transport and Sunbeam buses. Pacific Transport connects Lautoka directly to Nadi Intl Airport and Ba. Sunbeam runs 8 times daily Queen's Highway Service, linking Lautoka to Suva with stops at Nadi International Airport, Nadi Town, Fijian (Shangri – La) Resort, Sigatoka Town, Abua Sands, Hideaway Resort, Naviti Resort, Korolevu, Warwick Resorts, Beach House, Crusoes Retreat Junction, Deuba Inn and Tradewinds Lami.

Ferry Service by Patterson Brothers Shipping Company connects Lautoka to Labasa, Savusavu and Nabouwalu (Vanua Levu).

== Notable people ==
- Rishi Shankar, a Fiji Indian lawyer, elected to the House of Representatives of Fiji 1987
- Waqa Blake, Fijian-Australian rugby league player (for the Penrith Panthers), born in Lautoka
- Nathan Hughes, England Rugby Player, born in Lautoka
- Vijay Singh, PGA golfer
- Rinesh Sharma, a Fijian Politician FijiFirst
