= 1987 Fijian general election =

- 4–11 April 1987

All 52 seats in the House of Representatives 26 seats needed for a majority
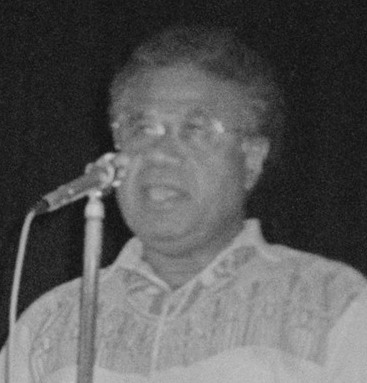

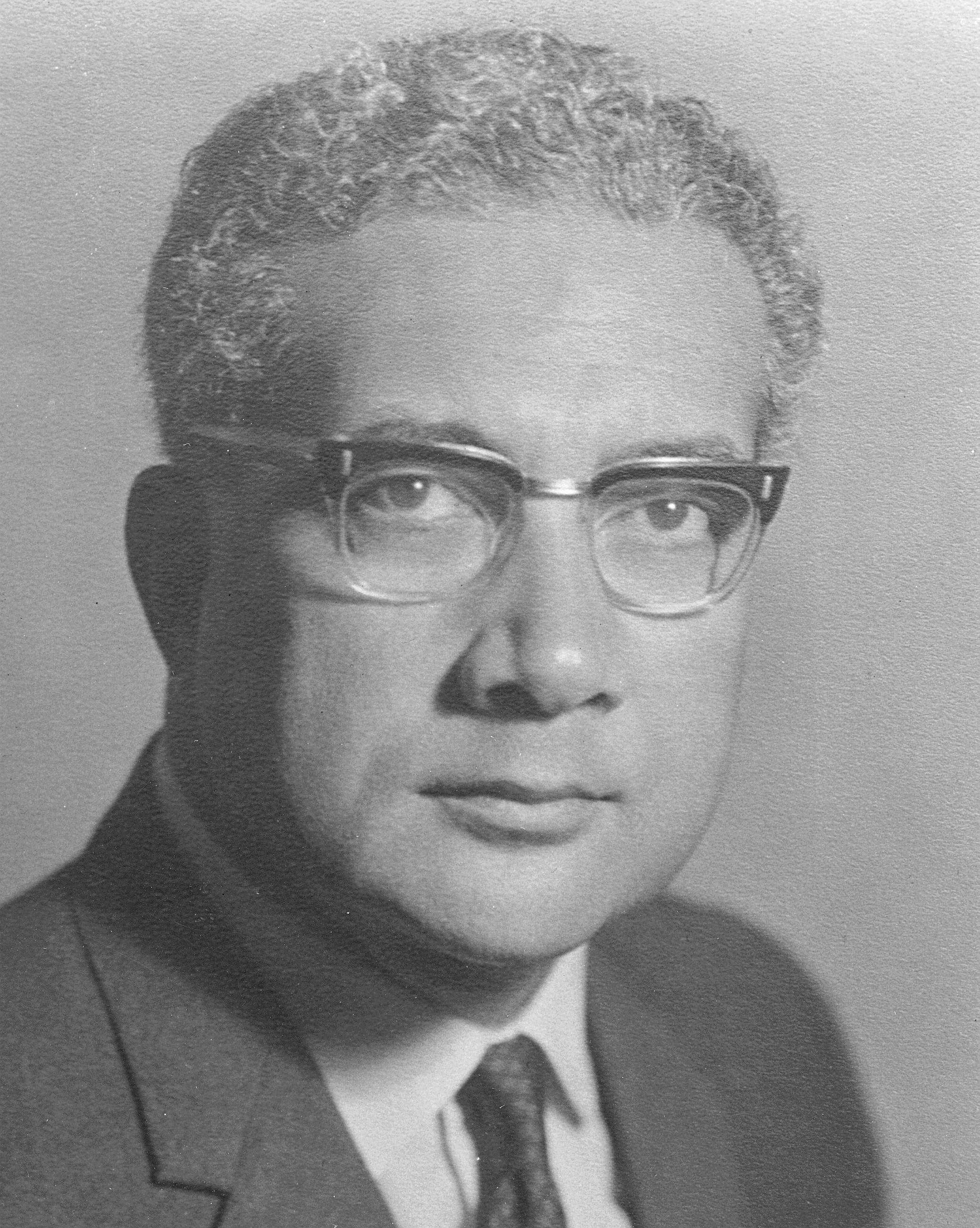
	First party	Second party
Leader	Timoci Bavadra	Kamisese Mara
Party	FLP–NFP	Alliance
Last election	22 seats	28 seats
Seats won	28	24
Seat change	▲6	▼4
Popular vote	461,056	484,543
Percentage	47.07%	49.46%
Swing	▲5.86pp	▼2.33pp
Prime Minister before election
Kamisese Mara
Alliance
Elected Prime Minister
Timoci Bavadra
Labour

General elections were held in Fiji between 4 and 11 April 1987. They marked the first electoral transition of power in Fijian history. Despite receiving just under 50% of the vote, the Alliance Party of longtime prime minister, Kamisese Mara was defeated by a coalition of the Fiji Labour Party (contesting a general election for the first time) and National Federation Party, which won 28 seats to the Alliance's 24. The Labour Party's Timoci Bavadra became prime minister.

Bavadra's 28-member parliamentary caucus included only seven ethnic Fijians, all of them elected with predominantly Indo-Fijian support from national constituencies. His fourteen-member cabinet included six Fijians, seven Indo-Fijians and one European. Effective Indo-Fijian control of the government caused widespread resentment among the ethnic Fijian community, and after less than a month in office, the new government was deposed on 14 May in a coup d'état led by Lieutenant-Colonel Sitiveni Rabuka.

== Electoral system ==
The 52 members of the House of Representatives were elected from two types of constituency, with candidature in each limited to one of three ethnic groups; Fijians, Indo-Fijians and General electors, generally of European or Chinese descent.

Twenty-seven members were elected from communal constituencies (12 Fijians, 12 Indo-Fijians and 3 general) in which voters voted for someone of their own ethnicity, with the remaining twenty-five elected from national constituencies (10 Fijian, 10 Indo-Fijian and 5 general) in which candidature was limited by ethnicity but all registered voters in a constituency could vote for.

== Results ==
Party	Votes	%	Seats	+/–
Alliance Party	484,543	49.46	24	−4
FLP–NFP	461,056	47.07	28	+6
Fijian Nationalist Party	14,484	1.48	0	0
Western United Front	8,339	0.85	0	−2
National Federation Party-Koya	4,462	0.46	0	New
Independents	6,723	0.69	0	0
Total	979,607	100.00	52	0
Valid votes	979,607	97.78		
Invalid/blank votes	22,238	2.22		
Total ballots cast	250,968	–		
Registered voters/turnout	353,691	70.96		
Source: Nohlen et al.

== Aftermath ==
Following the elections Bavadra formed a fourteen-member cabinet.

Bavadra cabinet
Position	Minister
Prime Minister; Minister for Public Service; Minister for Fijian Affairs; Minister for Home Affairs	Timoci Bavadra
Deputy Prime Minister; Minister for Housing and Urban Affairs; Minister for Information	Harish Sharma
Attorney General; Minister for Justice	Jai Ram Reddy
Minister for Agriculture, Fisheries and Forestry	Joeli Nacola
Minister for Communications, Transport and Works	Ahmed Bhamji
Minister for Education, Youth and Sport	Tupeni Baba
Minister of Finance and Economic Planning	Mahendra Chaudhry
Minister for Foreign Affairs and Civil Aviation	Krishna Datt
Minister for Health and Social Welfare	Satendra Nandan
Minister for Labour and Immigration	Joeli Kalou
Minister for Lands, Energy and Mineral Resources	Mosese Volavola
Minister for Trade, Industry and Tourism	Navin Maharaj
Minister of State for Cooperatives and Consumer Affairs	Chris Herbert
Minister of State for Rural Development, Rehabilitation and Relief	Temo Sukanaivalu

== See also ==
- List of members of the Parliament of Fiji (1987)
