= 1987 Fijian coups d'état =

1987 political events in Fiji

- Part of the Fijian coups
Date	14 May 1987 (first coup); 23 September 1987 (second coup)
Location	Fiji
Result	First coup succeeds, second coup fails: 14 May: Bavadra removed from power; 23 September: Fiji becomes a republic

Belligerents
(Fiji) Fijian Armed Forces	Government of Fiji

Commanders and leaders
(Fiji) Lt Col. Sitiveni Rabuka	(Fiji) Queen Elizabeth II; (Fiji) Sir Penaia Ganilau; (Fiji) Timoci Bavadra

The Fijian coups d'état of 1987 resulted in the overthrow of the recently elected government of Fijian prime minister Timoci Bavadra, the deposition of Elizabeth II as Queen of Fiji, and in the declaration of a republic. The first coup d'état, in which Bavadra was deposed, took place on 14 May 1987; a second coup d'état on 25 September ended the monarchy, and was shortly followed by the proclamation of a republic on 10 October. Both military actions were led by Lieutenant Colonel Sitiveni Rabuka, then third in command of the Royal Fiji Military Forces.

== Background ==
Both before and after Fiji regained its independence from the United Kingdom in 1970, tensions between the indigenous Fijian and Indo-Fijian ethnic groups (comprising an estimated 46% and 49% of the 1987 population, respectively) continually manifested themselves in social and political unrest.

Prior to the 1987 coups in Fiji, the Indian population's share as a fraction of the total Fijian population was increasing. From 1946 to the late 1980s, Indians were more numerous than indigenous Fijians, with the Indian population constituting a majority in Fiji from 1956 through to the late 1980s. Fiji's Indian population expansion arose from several factors, including high post–Second World War birth rates, a reduction in the indigenous Fijian population after the 1875 measles outbreak, and large-scale migration programmes initiated under British colonial rule in the late 19th century, when labourers were brought from British India to farm sugar cane.

The Fijian general election of April 1987 resulted in the replacement of the indigenous-led conservative government of Prime Minister Ratu Sir Kamisese Mara with a multi-ethnic Labour-led coalition supported mostly by the Indo-Fijian plurality and Rabuka claimed ethnic Fijian concerns of racial discrimination as his excuse for seizing power. Many authorities doubt the veracity of this, however, given existing constitutional guarantees.

== Coups d'etat ==
=== May coup ===
On the morning of 14 May, around 10 am, a section of ten masked, armed soldiers entered the Fijian House of Representatives and subdued the national legislature, which had gathered there for its morning session. Lieutenant Colonel Sitiveni Rabuka, dressed in civilian clothes, approached Prime Minister Timoci Bavadra from his position in the public gallery and ordered the members of parliament to leave the building. They did so without resisting. The coup was an apparent success and had been accomplished without loss of life.

At around 11 am, Radio Fiji announced the news of the military takeover. Rabuka was reported to have gone to Government House to see the Governor-General, Ratu Sir Penaia Ganilau. He was seeking recognition of the military action and the overthrow of the Bavadra government. A caretaker government was to be named shortly, and the public was urged to "remain calm and continue with their daily work." At the meeting, the Governor-General (who was Rabuka's paramount chief) gave a mild rebuke to Rabuka. He asked him "What have you done?" and "You mean I have no job?" He added that Rabuka should have given the deposed government more time. The meeting ended with Ratu Sir Penaia stating "Good luck, I hope you know what you are doing."

Following the coup, the Governor-General commissioned a Constitution Review Committee, led by Sir John Falvey, to look at the "deficiencies" of Fiji's 1970 constitution.

The commission was to begin hearings on 6 July and deliver its recommendations to the Governor-General by 31 July. Its terms of reference were to "strengthen the representation of indigenous Fijians, and in so doing bear in mind the best interests of other peoples in Fiji." The commission received 860 written and 120 oral submissions, and produced a report recommending a new unicameral legislature comprising 36 Fijians (28 elected and 8 appointed by the Great Council of Chiefs), 22 Indo-Fijians, 8 General electors, 1 Rotuman, and up to four nominees of the Prime Minister. National constituencies, ethnically allocated and elected by universal suffrage, were to be abolished, and all voting was to be communal. The Prime Minister's post was to be reserved for an indigenous Fijian.

The Governor-General dissolved Parliament and granted amnesty to Rabuka, while promoting him to the position of commander of the Royal Fiji Military Forces. The actions of the Governor-General were viewed with suspicion by the deposed government and Bavadra challenged Ratu Sir Penaia's decision in the Supreme Court of Fiji.

=== September coup ===
From independence in 1970, Fiji's head of state was the Queen of Fiji, Elizabeth II. The Fijian Supreme Court ruled the May coup to be totally unconstitutional, and the Governor-General attempted to assert executive reserve power. He opened negotiations known as the Deuba Talks with both the deposed government and the Alliance Party, which most indigenous Fijians supported. These negotiations culminated in the Deuba Accord of 23 September 1987, which provided for a government of national unity, in which both parties would be represented under the leadership of the Governor-General. Fearing that the gains of the first coup were about to be lost, Rabuka staged a second coup on 25 September. Rabuka then declared Fiji a republic on 7 October 1987, abrogating the Constitution of Fiji and stating that he had removed the Governor-General from office, and declaring himself Head of the Interim Military Government. Ratu Sir Penaia Ganilau resigned as Governor-General on 15 October, although he was made the first President of Fiji on 6 December 1987.

== International involvement ==
Australia and New Zealand, the two nations with foremost political influence in the region, were somewhat disquieted by the event, but ultimately took no action to intervene. They did, however, establish a policy of non-recognition regarding the new government, suspending foreign aid in concert with the United States and the United Kingdom.

The Australian labour movement, taking the ousting of a labour led government as an affront to the worldwide labour movement, instituted an embargo against shipments to Fiji. As Australia was Fiji's largest foreign trading partner, this resulted in a large diminution in Fiji's international trade.

== Aftermath ==
In the immediate aftermath of the second coup, the United Nations denounced the coup, demanding that the former government be restored. The Commonwealth responded with Fiji's immediate expulsion from the association.

Fiji's economy contracted by as much as 7.8% between 1987 and 1988, due to a major downturn in tourism and sugar production.

A new constitution was ratified in 1990, in which the offices of President and Prime Minister, along with two-thirds of the Senate and a substantial majority of the House of Representatives, were reserved for indigenous Fijians. These racially discriminatory provisions were eventually overturned by a constitutional revision in 1997. Fiji became a republic in the Commonwealth of Nations in late 1997.

The coups triggered much emigration by Indo-Fijians (particularly skilled workers), making them a minority by 1994.

In 2014, Rabuka admitted that Mara had told him to seize power before the coup, telling him during a golf game that "the only way to change the situation now is to throw this constitution out of the window".

In December 2024 the Rabuka government established the Fiji Truth and Reconciliation Commission to inquire into the 1987, 2000, and 2006 coups. In January 2025 Rabuka said he would identify those behind the coups to the commission.

== See also ==
- 2000 Fijian coup d'état (another ethnic based coup)
