= List of members of the Parliament of Fiji (1982–1987) =

The members of the Parliament of Fiji from 1982 to 1987 consisted of members of the House of Representatives elected between 10 and 17 July 1982, and members of the nominated Senate.

== House of Representatives ==
Constituency	Member	Party	Notes
Fijian Communal (12 seats)
Ba–Nadi	Apisai Tora	Alliance Party	
Bua–Macuata	Militoni Leweniqila	Alliance Party	
Cakaudrove	Jone Naisara	Alliance Party	
Kadavu–Tamavua–Suva Suburban	Akariva Nabati	Alliance Party	
Lau–Rotuma	Jonati Mavoa	Alliance Party	Replaced by Filipe Bole (Alliance) in 1985
Lomaiviti–Muanikau	Mosese Qionibaravi	Alliance Party	
Nadroga–Navosa	Apenisa Kurisaqila	Alliance Party	
Naitasiri	Livai Nasilivata	Alliance Party	
Ra–Samabula–Suva	Kolinio Qiqiwaqa	Alliance Party	
Rewa–Serua–Namosi	Tomasi Vakatora	Alliance Party	
Tailevu	William Toganivalu	Alliance Party	
Vuda–Yasawa	Josaia Tavaiqia	Alliance Party	
Indo-Fijian Communal (12 seats)
Ba	Navin Patel	National Federation Party	
Ba–Lautoka Rural	Sidiq Koya	National Federation Party	
Labasa–Bua	Mohammed Sadiq	National Federation Party	
Lautoka	Jai Ram Reddy	National Federation Party	
Nadi	H. M. Lodhia	National Federation Party	
Nasinu–Vunidawa	Satendra Nandan	National Federation Party	
Nausori–Levuka	Sarda Nand	National Federation Party	
Savusavu–Macuata East	Subramani Basawaiya	National Federation Party	
Sigatoka	Anirudh Kuver	National Federation Party	
Suva City	Irene Jai Narayan	National Federation Party	
Suva Rural	Vijay Parmanandam	National Federation Party	
Tavua–Vaileka	Ram Sami Goundar	National Federation Party	
General Communal (3 seats)
Northern and Eastern	Hugh Thaggard	Alliance Party	
South–Central	James Ah Koy	Alliance Party	
Western	Benjamin Wise	Alliance Party	
Fijian National (10 seats)
East Central	Penaia Ganilau	Alliance Party	
Lau-Cakaudrove–Rotuma	Kamisese Mara	Alliance Party	
North-Central	Temo Sukanivalu	National Federation Party	
North-Eastern	Filimone Nalatu	Western United Front	
North-Western	Koresi Matatolu	National Federation Party	
South-Central	Solomone Momoivalu	Alliance Party	
South-Eastern	Semesa Sikivou	Alliance Party	
South-Western	Isikeli Nadalo	Western United Front	
Suva	David Toganivalu	Alliance Party	
Vanua Levu North and West	Soso Kotonivere	National Federation Party	
Indo-Fijian National 10 seats)
East Central	K. R. Latchan	Alliance Party	
Lau–Cakaudrove	Ahmed Ali	Alliance Party	
North-Central	Vijay R. Singh	National Federation Party	Replaced by Uday Singh (Alliance) in 1985
North-Eastern	Iqbal Khan	National Federation Party	
North-Western	Jai Raj Singh	National Federation Party	
South Central	Ramanlal Kapadia	Alliance Party	
South-Eastern	Beniram Rambissesar	Alliance Party	
South-Western	Harish Sharma	National Federation Party	
Suva	Mohammed Ramzan	Alliance Party	
Vanua Levu North and West	Santa Singh	National Federation Party	
General National (5 seats)
Eastern	Charles Walker	Alliance Party	
Northern	James Smith	National Federation Party	
Southern	Peter Stinson	Alliance Party	
Vanua Levu–Lau	Ted Beddoes	Alliance Party	
Western	Arthur Jennings	National Federation Party	
Source: Fiji Elections

== Senate ==
Class	Member	Notes
President	Wesley Barrett	
Council of Rotuma's Nominee	Kamoe Petero	
Great Council of Chiefs' Nominees	Jone Mataitini	
Great Council of Chiefs' Nominees	Aporosa Rakoto	
Great Council of Chiefs' Nominees	Joeli Sereki	Replaced by Jona Qio
Great Council of Chiefs' Nominees	Inoke Tabua	
Great Council of Chiefs' Nominees	Manasa Tabuadua	
Great Council of Chiefs' Nominees	Tevita Vakalalabure	Replaced by Seci Nawalowalo
Great Council of Chiefs' Nominees	Livai Volavola	
Great Council of Chiefs' Nominees	Epineri Vula	
Leader of the Opposition's Nominees	Muntaz Farzand Ali	
Leader of the Opposition's Nominees	Napolioni Dawai	
Leader of the Opposition's Nominees	Osea Gavidi	
Leader of the Opposition's Nominees	Harnam Singh Golian	
Leader of the Opposition's Nominees	Kaur Baltan Singh	Replaced by Krishna Narsingha Rao
Leader of the Opposition's Nominees	Colin Weaver	Replaced by Balwant Singh Rakka
Prime Minister's Nominees	Jone Banuve	
Prime Minister's Nominees	Ifereimi Buaserau	Replaced by Leo Smith
Prime Minister's Nominees	Bill Clark	
Prime Minister's Nominees	Sher Mohammed Khan Sherani	Replaced by Asad Ali Asgar
Prime Minister's Nominees	R. D. Patel	
Prime Minister's Nominees	Manikam Pillai	Replaced by Qoriniasi Bale in 1984
Source: Fiji Today, Fiji Handbook
