= 1982 Fijian general election =

- 10–17 July 1982

All 52 seats in the House of Representatives 26 seats needed for a majority
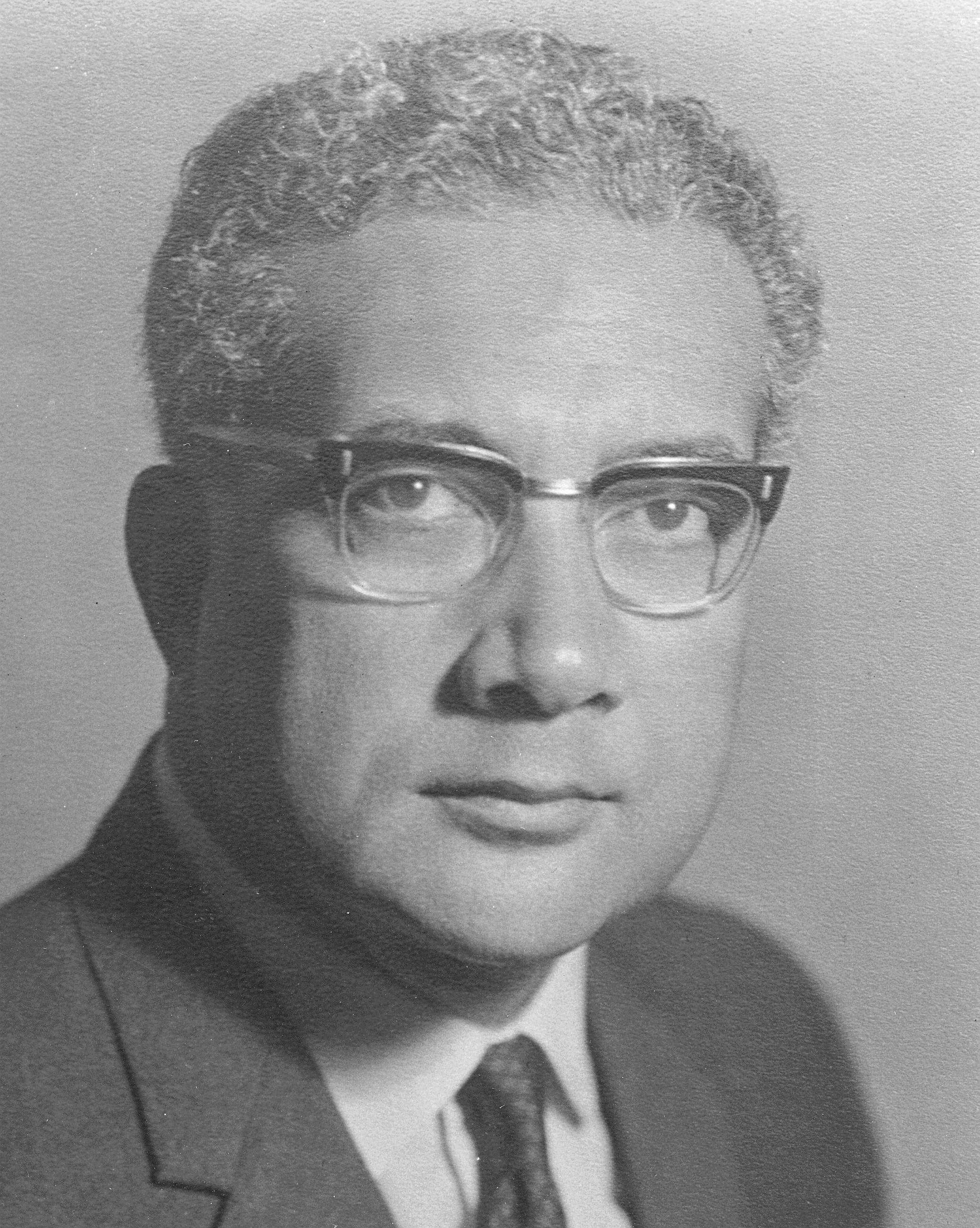
	First party	Second party
		NFP
Leader	Kamisese Mara	Jai Ram Reddy
Party	Alliance	NFP
Last election	36 seats	15 seats
Seats won	28	22
Seat change	▼8	▲7
Popular vote	507,163	403,548
Percentage	51.79%	41.21%
Swing	▼0.46pp	▼3.08pp
Prime Minister before election
Kamisese Mara
Alliance
Elected Prime Minister
Kamisese Mara
Alliance

General elections were held in Fiji between 10 and 17 July 1982. The paradoxical results were both a triumph and a setback for the Alliance Party of the Prime Minister, Kamisese Mara. The Alliance received 52% of the popular vote, only slightly down on its previous total, but won only 28 seats, eight fewer than in the previous elections of September 1977. Part of the reason for this discrepancy was that the slight surge in support for Mara's Alliance in the Indo-Fijian community, from 14 percent to 16 percent, was not sufficient to translate into seats in Fiji's communal electoral system, and did not therefore off-set losses among the ethnic Fijian community, particularly in the west of the country. The Western United Front of Osea Gavidi won only two seats, but split the vote, allowing the National Federation Party (NFP), with which it tactically allied itself, to gain seven seats for a total of 22. The NFP, which had split into two factions before the previous elections, had been reunited.

== Campaign ==
A total of 137 candidates contested the 52 seats in the House of Representatives. One candidate – Subramani Basawaiya of the National Federation Party – was elected unopposed in the Savusavu–Macuatu East Indo-Fijian communal constituency, after his sole opponent, Alliance Party candidate Shiu Prasad, withdrew from the contest shortly before the elections. The Alliance claimed the withdrawal was tactical, as it would mean Indo-Fijian voters would be less likely to come out to vote, giving the Alliance an advantage in the national constituencies.

The Fijian Nationalist Party campaigned on a 'Fiji for the Fijians' platform, with their manifesto including policies of reserving 46 of the 52 seats in the House of Representatives for Fijians and returning all freehold and crown lands to the Fijian community.

The Fijian-dominated Western United Front, established in July 1981 and led by Osea Gavidi, formed an electoral pact with the Indo-Fijian dominated National Federation Party, resulting in the NFP standing down in six Fijian national constituencies to allow the WUF to run.

== Results ==
The Alliance received 86% of the vote in the Fijian communal constituencies, with the WUF on 7% and the NFP just 0.8%. In Indo-Fijian communal constituencies the NFP received 84% of the vote and the Alliance 15%.

Three deputy ministers lost their seats; Bill Clark, Ishwari Prasad Bajpai and Sakiasi Waqnivavalagi.

Party	Votes	%	Seats	+/–
Alliance Party	507,163	51.79	28	–8
National Federation Party	403,548	41.21	22	+7
Western United Front	37,266	3.81	2	New
Fijian Nationalist Party	27,329	2.79	0	0
Independents	3,903	0.40	0	–1
Total	979,209	100.00	52	0
Valid votes	979,209	98.04		
Invalid/blank votes	19,605	1.96		
Total ballots cast	242,712	–		
Registered voters/turnout	292,341	83.02		
Source: Nohlen et al.

== Aftermath ==
Following the elections, Mara formed a fifteen-member cabinet.

Position	Minister
Prime Minister	Kamisese Mara
Deputy Prime Minister; Minister of Fijian Affairs and Rural Development	Penaia Ganilau
Attorney General	Manikam Pillai
Minister of Agriculture and Fisheries	Jonati Mavoa
Minister of Communications and Works	Semesa Sikivou
Minister of Economic Planning and Development	David Toganivalu
Minister of Education and Youth	Ahmed Ali
Minister of Energy and Minerals	Peter Stinson
Minister of Employment and Industrial Relations	Mohammed Ramzan
Minister of Finance	Charles Walker
Minister of Foreign Affairs; Minister of Tourism	Mosese Qionibaravi
Minister of Health and Social Welfare	Apenisa Kurisaqila
Minister of Home Affairs	William Toganivalu
Minister of Lands, Local Government and Housing	Militoni Leweniqila
Minister of Transport and Civil Aviation	Ted Beddoes
Minister of State for Co-operatives	Livai Nasilivata
Minister of State for Forests	Josaia Tavaiqia
Minister without Portfolio	Apisai Tora
Source: Pacific Islands Monthly

== See also ==
- List of members of the Parliament of Fiji (1982–1987)
