= Solicitor-General of Fiji =

The solicitor-general of Fiji is the chief executive officer of the Attorney-General's Chambers, and as such assists the attorney-general in advising the government on legal matters, and in performing legal work for the government. The previous solicitor-general was Christopher Pryde, who took office in July 2007 until he was appointed director of public prosecutions in 2011. The office is currently vacant, although Deputy Solicitor-General Sharvada Sharma has been acting in the position to date.

Unlike the attorney-general, who holds political office as a member of the House of Representatives or Senate, the solicitor-general is a civil servant. He is required by the Constitution to hold a law degree and to be a registered lawyer.

== List of solicitors-general of Fiji ==
The following persons have held the office of solicitor-general since it was established in 1945.

No.	Solicitor-General	Tenure
1.	Alastair Granville Forbes	1945–1948
2.	Brian Andre Doyle	1948–1951
3.	Philip Neale Dalton	1951–1953
4.	William Gordon Bryce	1953–1956
5.	Ashley Martin Greenwood	1956
6.	Henry Roger Justin Lewis	1956–1963
7.	Donald McLoughlin	1963–1971
8.	Harold Picton-Smith	1971–1979
9.	Qoriniasi Babitu Bale	1979–1984
10.	John Richard Flower	1984–1987
11.	Filimone Jitoko	1987–1993
12.	Isikeli Mataitoga	1993–1997
13.	Nainendra Nand	1997–2006
14.	Christopher Pryde	2007 – 2011
15.	Sharvada Nand Sharma (acting)	2011 — ?
15.	Ropate Green Lomavatu	2023 — present
