= Group Against Racial Discrimination =

Pressure group in Fiji

The Group Against Racial Discrimination (GARD) was formed in Fiji in 1990 to act as a pressure group against the unilateral imposition of a discriminatory constitution by the military Government controlled by Major General Sitiveni Rabuka.

== Imposition of new constitution on people of Fiji ==
After the two coups executed by Major General Sitiveni Rabuka against Timoci Bavadra’s NFP–Labour Coalition government in 1987, the country was still in a state of political uncertainty in 1990. It had been declared a Republic by Rabuka soon after his second coup in September 1987, but after two attempts at finding a Constitution acceptable to all sections of Fiji's community, success was still elusive. Fiji was ostensibly being ruled by an interim government with Ratu Sir Penaia Ganilau as President and Ratu Sir Kamisese Mara as Prime Minister. The military, however, still held a strong grip on the affairs of the nation, and called all the shots.

After the failure of the interim government in having two versions of its proposed Constitution accepted by all people of Fiji, the country was in a political stalemate. The announcement on the night of the 25 July 1990 by the President of Fiji of a new Constitution came as a complete shock to the people of Fiji as it had happened without any prelude.

Initially, those opposed to the imposition of the new constitution, and brave enough to express their views, began expressing their opposition to the new constitution through letters to the media. But the interim government was adamant that the constitution was there to stay. And it did everything in its power to create an impression that the unilaterally-imposed Constitution had been accepted by all citizens of Fiji.

== Formation ==
To co-ordinate efforts against the imposition which was regarded as unjust, it was decided to form a pressure group, known as Group Against Racial Discrimination (GARD). This was a loose grouping of like-thinking individuals, most of whom were University of the South Pacific (USP) academics, who had the common desire to see the restoration of a democratic government in the country after the 1970 constitution had been abrogated by Major-General Rabuka. Their main aim was to bring the plight of the people of Fiji to the notice of the free world through letters and other means of communication. Efforts towards the local campaign quickly became ineffectual after the media began refusing to publish the letters.

== Burning of Constitution ==
GARD decided that a better way to demonstrate its opposition was by burning copies of the constitution. This had been tried a couple of times earlier, however, these actions had been largely ineffective as they had failed to gain any publicity. To gain widespread publicity in Fiji, and internationally, it was decided to carry out the protest during celebrations for the Diwali Festival, also known as the festival of lights, celebrated by Hindus.

The protest was implemented on Thursday, 18 October 1990 in Suva. After a short speech by Dr. Anirudh Singh, a USP lecturer, a copy of the constitution was burnt. The protest was duly reported in the Daily Post the next day, with the front-page headline saying “Hindus burn constitution”. The interim government called an emergency cabinet meeting. It condemned the protest, and released a statement calling the action “treasonous and despicable”. It asked the police to investigate.

In the week that made, plain-clothes policemen visited USP to obtain statements from some of the members of the protest group. Members of GARD, including the Chair-person, Dr. Anirudh Singh, were taken to the Police Headquarters in Suva for questioning. During the week, a member of GARD who worked for the media informed GARD members that they were under surveillance by the army. The group feared receiving the same type of punitive treatment that some of their USP colleagues had received soon after the 1987 coups at the hands of the military. They had been taken captive and detained by the military for extended periods of time, during which they had been subjected to physical and psychological torture and interrogation.

== Chairperson of GARD abducted ==
Despite precautions by members of the group, on the morning of Wednesday, 24 October 1990, Dr Anirudh Singh was abducted while on his way to work. Dr Singh was blind-folded and taken to a forest in hills outside Suva called Colo-i-Suva. He was gagged and severely beaten and interrogated for 12 hours. His captors then left him in the dark and disappeared. Dr Singh made his way to a road and was driven to safety by a passing taxi. He had incurred severe injuries to his face and hands and needed to travel to Australia for medical treatment.

On 22 November 1990, five members of the Special Operations Security Unit of the Republic of Fiji Military Forces pleaded guilty to the abduction and torture of Dr Singh and were sentenced to 12 months imprisonment suspended for 15 months. The army denied that the five had acted on its orders and even sent them on peace keeping duties overseas.

== High Court of Fiji rules in favour of GARD chairperson ==
Dr Singh sued the five and the Attorney General and after a thirteen-year delay, on 1 November 2006, the High Court of Fiji ruled in favour of Dr Singh. In his judgement, Justice R.J. Coventry said "I do find that there were tortious acts as pleaded in the Statement of Claim committed by the first five defendants. I do not find that the defence under section 52 of the Royal Fiji Military Forced Act is available to the five defendants nor consequently the sixth defendant. I find that the tortious acts committed by the five defendants were so closely connected with their employment and in particular the functions and purposes of the Special Operations Security Unit that the sixth defendant, representing the State, is vicariously liable for those tortious acts.”

Dr Singh, speaking to Fiji Live said he has finally found closure as the matter has been in the judicial system for 13 years. "People have been asking me, is it about the money? Money is not important. What's important is the fact that we have proved ourselves that we were right. Today's ruling has set a precedent and is clearly a landmark case that will definitely have positive ramifications. There are many others that were tortured during the period after the 1987 coup.”
