= Anand Singh (Fijian politician) =

Fijian lawyer and politician (1948–2020)

The Honourable Anand Kumar Singh

32nd Attorney General of Fiji
- In office 19 May 1999 – 27 May 2000
- President: Ratu Sir Kamisese Mara
- Prime Minister: Mahendra Chaudhry
- Preceded by: Kelemedi Bulewa
- Succeeded by: Alipate Qetaki

Member of Parliament for Lautoka Rural Indian
- In office 19 May 1999 – 27 May 2000
- Succeeded by: Udit Narayan

Senator
- In office 2001–2006
- Appointed by: Leader of the Opposition

Personal details
- Born: 8 August 1948 Bombay, Dominion of India
- Died: 4 December 2020 (aged 72) Auckland, New Zealand
- Party: Fiji Labour Party
- Relations: Parmanand Singh (father)
- Children: 3 sons, 1 daughter (deceased)
- Profession: Lawyer

Anand Kumar Singh (8 August 1948 – 4 December 2020) was a Fijian lawyer and politician of Indian descent.

== Biography ==
He was born in Bombay, when his family had temporarily moved to India. The family returned from India in 1951 to live at the birthplace of his father, Parmanand Singh, in Yalalevu, Ba. His father was one of the first three Indo-Fijians to be elected to the Legislative Council of Fiji.

A member of the Fiji Labour Party, he was elected to represent the Lautoka Rural Indian Communal Constituency in the House of Representatives, and was appointed Attorney-General in the government of Prime Minister Mahendra Chaudhry, serving until the government was deposed in the Fiji coup of 2000.

On 19 May 2000, he was among the 43 members of the People's Coalition Government, led by Mahendra Chaudhry, taken hostage by George Speight and his band of rebel Republic of Fiji Military Forces (RFMF) soldiers from the Counter Revolutionary Warfare Unit. He was released on 12 July 2000.

From 2001 to 2006, he served as one of 8 Senators nominated by the Leader of the Opposition.

Singh practiced law privately, and was the senior partner of the Chaudhry and Singh law firm, which includes Rajendra Chaudhry, Mahendra Chaudhry's son.

In November 2019 he was elected president of the Fiji Labour Party.

Singh died in Middlemore Hospital in Auckland, New Zealand on 4 December 2020.

Legal offices
Preceded by Kelemedi Bulewa	Attorney-General of Fiji; 1999 - 2000	Succeeded by Alipate Qetaki
