= Qoriniasi Bale =

Barrister, a solicitor and a politician

The Honourable Qoriniasi Babitu Bale

25th Attorney General of Fiji
- In office 1984–1987
- Monarch: Elizabeth II
- Governor General: Ratu Sir Penaia Ganilau
- Prime Minister: Ratu Sir Kamisese Mara
- Preceded by: Manikam Pillai
- Succeeded by: Jai Ram Reddy
- In office 2001–2006
- President: Josefa Iloilo
- Prime Minister: Laisenia Qarase
- Preceded by: Alipate Qetaki
- Succeeded by: Aiyaz Sayed-Khaiyum

9th Solicitor-General of Fiji
- In office 1979–1984
- Governor General: Ratu Sir Penaia Ganilau
- Prime Minister: Ratu Sir Kamisese Mara
- Preceded by: Harold Picton-Smith
- Succeeded by: John Richard Flower

Senator of Fiji 1st time
- In office 1984–1987
- Appointed by: Prime Minister of Fiji

Senator of Fiji 2nd time
- In office 2001–2006
- Appointed by: Prime Minister of Fiji

Personal details
- Born: 1941 Levukana, Vanua Balavu, Fiji
- Died: 21 March 2014 (aged 72–73) Sigatoka, Fiji
- Party: Alliance Party Fiji; Soqosoqo Duavata ni Lewenivanua

Qoriniasi Babitu Bale (1941 — 21 March 2014) was a Fijian barrister, solicitor and politician who served twice as Minister for Justice and Attorney-General, most recently from 2001 to 2006, when he was deposed in the military coup of 5 December. Like many of Fiji's most influential leaders, Bale was a native of Levukana Village in Vanua Balavu in the Lau Islands.

== Education and early career ==
Bale was educated at Queen Victoria School and Suva Boys Grammar School then University of Otago and Victoria University in Wellington, New Zealand, from where he graduated with an LLB degree in 1969. Upon returning to Fiji, he was appointed a Crown Counsel in the Crown Law Office, and subsequently became a Crown Prosecutor in the Office of the Director of Public Prosecutions in 1970. In 1975, he became Principal Legal Officer in the Crown Law Office, before being promoted to Solicitor General in 1979, a post he held until 1984. Bale is the first indigenous Fijian Solicitor General; his predecessors had all been from the United Kingdom.

== Political career ==
Bale had his first foray into politics in 1984, when the Governor General of Fiji appointed him to the Senate at the nomination of Prime Minister Ratu Sir Kamisese Mara. At that time the Senate consisted of 22 members, 7 of whom were nominated by the Prime Minister. He became Attorney General in the Cabinet, and later that year was also appointed to the newly created position of Minister for Justice. He retired from politics for the first time following the defeat of the Alliance Party in the general election of 1987.

Following the Fiji coups of 1987, Bale went into private practice as a barrister and a solicitor. He served as Legal Adviser to the Great Council of Chiefs and the Fijian Affairs Board for 18 years, and as Chairman of the Electoral Commission and the Constituency Boundaries Commission from 1990 to 1996. Balewas also Chairman of Ratu Sukuna Memorial School from 1988 to 1996, and Chairman of the Council of the Fiji School of Medicine for 10 years.

Following the restoration of democracy to the island nation after the Fiji coup of 2000, Prime Minister Laisenia Qarase appointed Bale to the Senate in September 2001. One of the 9 out of 32 Senators chosen by the Prime Minister, he found himself holding the portfolios of Attorney-General and Minister for Justice once more.

== Policies ==
A member of the Soqosoqo Duavata ni Lewenivanua Party (SDL), he was known to have Fijian nationalist sympathies and called for substantial amendments to be made to the Constitution adopted in 1997. This Constitution, which was abrogated in the course of the 2000 coup, was subsequently reinstated in March 2001, following two court rulings.

In May and June 2005, Bale promoted the Reconciliation, Tolerance, and Unity Bill, which proposes the establishment of a Commission with the power, subject to presidential approval, to compensate victims and pardon perpetrators of crimes related to the 2000 coup.

In July 2006, Bale claimed that the Fiji Labour Party had no right to call itself the opposition and appoint shadow ministers. Bale said "as far as the Opposition goes there are only two formal Opposition members while the rest of the FLP members are government back-benchers."

Legal offices
Preceded by Harold Picton-Smith	Solicitor General of Fiji; 1979-1984	Succeeded by John Richard Flower
Preceded by Vasagam Pillai	1st time Attorney General of Fiji; 1984-1987	Succeeded by Jai Ram Reddy
Preceded by Alipate Qetaki	2nd time Attorney General of Fiji; 2001-2006	Succeeded by Aiyaz Sayed-Khaiyum
Political offices
Preceded by	1st time Senator of Fiji; 1984-1987	Succeeded by
Preceded by	2nd time Senator of Fiji; 2001-2006	Succeeded by
