= Fiji Law Reform Commission =

The Fiji Law Reform Commission is independent publicly funded commission, which helps develop and review legislation in Fiji. The Fiji Law Reform Commission Act established the Commission in 1979, to serve as an advisory body to the government and Parliament. The Commission reviews legislation and advises the lawmakers as to how to implement reforms.

The various responsibilities of the Commission include the drafting of legislation, codification of laws and streamlining of legal administration, and finding and eliminating anomalies in the laws. The repeal of obsolete or redundant laws is also explored by the commission.

The Commission consists of a chairperson, appointed by the President, and a minimum of three other Commissioners. The commission is chaired by Alipate Qetaki, a former Attorney-General; the other three positions are currently vacant.

== List of Chairpersons of the Fiji Law Reform Commission ==
#	Executive Chairperson [1]	Tenure
1.	Justice K. A. Stuart	1980 - 1984
2.	Manikam Pillai	1984 - 1987
Commission not functioning		1987 - 1992
Vacant		1992 - 1993
3.	Daniel V. Fatiaki	1994 - 1995
4.	Anthony Tarr	1996
5.	R. Matebalavu	1997-1998
Vacant		1999 - 2002
6.	Alipate Qetaki	2003–present
[1] Before 2003, the office now called Executive Chairperson was called Chairman.
