= Etuate Tavai =

Fijian Attorney General (1958–1999)

The Honourable Ratu Etuate Tavai also known as Ratu Etuate Vugakoto Tavaiqia

31st Attorney General of Fiji
- In office 1996–1999
- President: Ratu Sir Kamisese Mara
- Prime Minister: Sitiveni Rabuka
- Preceded by: Kelemedi Bulewa
- Succeeded by: Anand Singh

Senator of Fiji
- In office ?–1999

Personal details
- Born: 20 February 1958 Lautoka, Fiji
- Died: 11 October 1999 (aged 41)
- Party: Soqosoqo ni Vakavulewa ni Taukei
- Education: University of the South Pacific

Ratu Etuate Tavai also known as Ratu Etuate Vugakoto Tavaiqia (1958 -1999) served as Attorney General of Fiji from 1996 to 1999. He also served as a senator.

He died on 11 October 1999 at age 41.

Ratu Tavai was born on 20 February 1958 at Lautoka, Fiji. He hailed from the chiefly village of Viseisei, Vuda and was from the paramount chiefly family of the Vanua of Vuda. His father, Ratu Ilaijia Vuivuda, was a medical professional and Vice-Captain of the Fiji Rugby Union Team that first defeated Australia in 1952.

He attended the University of the South Pacific, Laucala Campus and also the University of Auckland, where he attained his Bachelor of Arts and Bachelors of Law.

He began his legal career as a prosecutor at the Office of the Director of Public Prosecution. He then gained further legal experience in the private and public sector.

Ratu Tavai was first elected in Parliament in 1992 and served as Minister of State in the Prime Minister's Office. Subsequent appointments included Minister for Information, Broadcasting and Telecommunications between 1995 and 1996 before being appointed as Attorney-General in 1996, a position he held until May, 1999.

During his time as Attorney-General, he facilitated the enactment of the 1997 Constitution of Fiji. A record number of bills went through Parliament during his tenure. He was instrumental in ensuring that the legal profession continued to maintain high standards and saw the enactment of the Legal Practitioners Act, Trust Accounts Act and the Legal Aid Act. The first Attorney-General's Conference was held through his guidance. He also refused to legalize same-sex marriage and other homosexual relationships.

Tavai was married to Adi Iva Fugawai Uluiviti (also known as Iva Tavai), a distinguished career civil servant, and they had two daughters.

Legal offices
Preceded by Kelemedi Bulewa	Attorney General of Fiji; 1996—1999	Succeeded by Anand Singh
Political offices
Preceded by	Senator of Fiji ?—1999	Succeeded by
