= Henry Roger Justin Lewis =

The Honourable Henry Roger Justin Lewis

20th Attorney General of Fiji
- In office 1963–1970
- Monarch: Elizabeth II
- Governor: Sir Kenneth Maddocks; Sir Derek Jakeway; Sir Robert Sidney Foster
- Preceded by: Ashley Greenwood
- Succeeded by: John Falvey

6th Solicitor General of Fiji
- In office 1956–1963
- Monarch: Elizabeth II
- Governor: Sir Ronald Garvey; Sir Kenneth Maddocks
- Ratu Sir Kamisese Mara (from 20 September 1967)
- Preceded by: Ashley Greenwood
- Succeeded by: Donal McLoughlin

Personal details
- Born: 6 December 1925 Staffordshire, England
- Died: 19 July 2007 (aged 81)

Henry Roger Justin Lewis CBE and honorary QC (6 December 1925 – 19 July 2007) was a British lawyer who served as Solicitor General of Fiji from 1956 to 1963, and as Attorney General of Fiji from 1963 to 1970. He was awarded the CBE on 1st January 1969.

Lewis participated in the Marlborough House conference chaired by Eirene White in July 1965, to discuss constitutional reforms. The Fijian delegation consisted of six ethnic Fijians (Ratu Sir George Cakobau, Ratu Sir Edward Cakobau, Ratu Sir Penaia Ganilau, Ratu Sir Kamisese Mara, Josua Rabukawaqa, and Semesa Sikivou), six Indo-Fijians (Dr. A. D. Patel, Sidiq Koya, James Madhavan, C. A. Shah, Andrew Deoki, and C. P. Singh), and six Europeans (John Falvey, Ronald Kermode, John Moore, John Kearsley, Fred Archibald, and Cyril Aidney). The Governor, Sir Derek Jakeway, and Lewis himself, as Attorney General, were designated separately. They were joined by a nine-member British delegation.

Following Fijian independence in October 1970, he returned to England where he resumed working as a barrister at a criminal law practice at the Goldsmith Buildings in the Inner Temple. Lewis died on 19 July 2007, at the age of 81.

Legal offices
Preceded by Ashley Greenwood	Solicitor General of Fiji; 1956-1963	Succeeded by Donal McLoughlin
Preceded by Ashley Greenwood	Attorney General of Fiji; 1963-1970	Succeeded by John Falvey
