= Parmanand Singh =

Fijian politician

Member of the Legislative Council for Northern and Western
- In office 1929
- Preceded by: Seat created
- Succeeded by: Muniswamy Mudaliar

Personal details
- Born: 1905 Ba, Fiji
- Profession: Businessman

Parmanand Singh (born 1905) was one of the three Indo-Fijians elected to the Legislative Council of Fiji in October 1929 when Indo-Fijians were given the first opportunity to elect their own representatives. The other two were Vishnu Deo and James Ramchandar Rao. Singh was a landlord from Ba and undertook several business ventures which included publishing newspapers.

== Biography ==
Parmanand Singh was born in Yalalevu in the Ba District of Fiji in 1905. His parents had come to Fiji as indentured labourers and prospered in the opportunities available after indenture. He was educated at Auckland College, graduating in 1923. While in New Zealand, he played rugby, a game rarely played by Fiji Indians.

On his return to Fiji, he took advantage of a business opportunity by leasing land from Colonial Sugar Refining Company (CSR) and sub-leasing it to small farmers.

Like most rich farmers from Ba, he joined the Arya Samaj and was chosen by Vishnu Deo to contest the Northern & Western Division in the 1929 general elections, the first in which Indo-Fijians were allowed to vote. He won easily with the support of Deo and the Arya Samaj, an organisation to which most educated Fiji Indians belonged. However, two weeks after being sworn in he and the two other Indo-Fijians representatives resigned when a motion asking for equal political rights for Indo-Fijians was defeated.

He was opposed to the immigration of Punjabis and Gujaratis, a cause later taken up by his brother, Chattur Singh who was later also a member of the Legislative Council.

In 1948, he left for India for the education of his children and returned 3 years later.

He saw opportunities in the printing industry and established a printing press in Ba, which he used to publish a newspaper, Awaaz (The Voice) in the Hindi language. He was unable to keep the newspaper in circulation due to a natural disaster and poor staff. He then moved to Lautoka and in 1956, started publishing another newspaper, Jai Fiji, which remained in circulation until 1980.

The family involvement in Fijian politics has continued with his son, Anand Singh, also serving in the House of Representatives and Senate and as the Attorney General of Fiji in the Fiji Labour Party government of Mahendra Chaudhry from 1999 to 2000.
