= Chief Justice of St Vincent =

The chief justice of St Vincent was the head of the Supreme Court of Saint Vincent in Saint Vincent, an island member of the Windward Islands in the West Indies.

The court was replaced by the Windward and Leeward Islands Supreme Court and the Windward and Leeward Islands Court of Appeal in 1939; both in turn were replaced in 1967 by the Eastern Caribbean Supreme Court which performs both functions.

== List of chief justices ==
- 1803– Drewry Ottley (died 1807)
- 1811– Edward Sharpe
- 1822– William Wylly
- 1827– John Henry Hobson
- 1831–1846 John Peterson
- 1846–>1856 Henry Edward Sharpe
- 1866–>1896 George Trafford
- 1897 Geoffrey St. Aubyn (acting)
- 1903–1906 Percy Musgrave Cresswell Sheriff (afterwards Chief Justice of St Lucia, 1906)
- 1907– Walter Shaw (afterwards Chief Justice of British Honduras, 1912)
- 1912–1915 Robert Blair Roden (afterwards Chief Justice of British Honduras, 1915)
- 1915–1919 Sir Anthony de Freitas (afterwards Chief Justice of St Lucia, 1919)
- 1919– Samuel Joyce Thomas
- 1923–1927 James Stanley Rae (afterwards Chief Justice of Grenada, 1927)
- 1928– Willoughby Bullock
- 1930–1931 James Henry Jarrett (acting) (afterwards Attorney-General of the Bahamas, 1933)
- 1931–1933 Ransley Thacker (afterwards Attorney General of Fiji, 1933)
- 1935–1938 George Cyril Griffith Williams
