= Sailosi Kepa =

Fijian statesman, judge, and diplomat

The Honourable Sailosi Wai Kepa

28th Attorney General of Fiji
- In office 1988–1992
- President: Ratu Sir Penaia Ganilau
- Prime Minister: Ratu Sir Kamisese Mara
- Preceded by: Alipate Qetaki
- Succeeded by: Apaitia Seru

Judge of the High Court of Fiji
- In office 1992–1998
- President: Ratu Sir Penaia Ganilau; Ratu Sir Kamisese Mara
- Prime Minister: Sitiveni Rabuka
- Chief Justice: Sir Timoci Tuivaga

1st Chairman, Fiji Human Rights Commission
- In office 1998–2001
- President: Ratu Sir Kamisese Mara; Ratu Josefa Iloilo
- Prime Minister: Sitiveni Rabuka; Mahendra Chaudhry; Ratu Tevita Momoedonu; Laisenia Qarase

Ombudsman of Fiji
- In office 2001 – August 2003
- President: Ratu Josefa Iloilo
- Prime Minister: Laisenia Qarase

Personal details
- Born: 4 November 1938
- Died: 1 March 2004 (aged 65)
- Spouse: Ro Teimumu Vuikaba Tuisawau-Kepa
- Children: 1 son, 2 daughters
- Education: Lelean Memorial School; Nasinu Teachers College; University of Sydney; Middle Temple
- Profession: Teacher, Lawyer, Judge, Diplomat

Sailosi Wai Kepa (4 November 1938 – 1 March 2004) was a Fijian statesman, judge, and diplomat.

Hailing from the village of Nukuni on the island of Ono-i-Lau, he was educated at Draiba Fijian School and Lelean Memorial School, before enrolling in Nasinu Teachers College in 1959. He went on to receive a diploma in Teaching of English from the University of Sydney in 1966. In 1972, he received a law degree from the Middle Temple in London, England.

After joining the Department of Justice as a magistrate in 1969 (serving Suva, Sigatoka, Nadi, and the Northern Division), he became Chief Magistrate in 1980. He also became Director of Public Prosecutions in November that year. He went on to become Fiji's High Commissioner to London in 1985, and Minister for Justice and Attorney General in 1988. He served in this role until 1992, when he became a High Court judge. In 1998 he was appointed the first Chairman of Fiji's Human Rights Commission. His last official post was as Fiji's Ombudsman, a post he held from 2001 till his retirement in August 2003.

In his younger years, Kepa made a name for himself as a rugby player. He was later rewarded by being made Chairman of the Fiji Rugby Union from 1983 to 1986. He was granted life membership in 1994.

Kepa was married for many years to Ro Teimumu Kepa, an Adi (Fijian chief) and politician in her own right, who is the Roko Tui Dreketi (Paramount Chief) of the Burebasaga Confederacy and served as Minister for Education from 2001 to 2006 in the government of Prime Minister Laisenia Qarase. Since 2014, she has been Leader of the Social Democratic Liberal Party, and since the general elections in September that year, Leader of the Opposition.

Legal offices
Preceded by Alipate Qetaki	1st time Attorney General of Fiji; 1988-1992	Succeeded by Apaitia Seru
Preceded by	Judge of the High Court of Fiji; 1992-1998	Succeeded by
Preceded by None (New office)	Chairman, Fiji Human Rights Commission; 1998-2001	Succeeded by
Preceded by	Ombudsman of Fiji; 2001-2003	Succeeded by
