= Attorney General Vaughan =

Attorney General Vaughan may refer to:

- John Henry Vaughan (1892–1965), Attorney General of Zanzibar and Attorney General of Fiji
- John Vaughan (Australian politician) (1879–1955), Attorney-General of South Australia

== See also ==
- General Vaughan (disambiguation)
