= Brian André Doyle =

Solicitor-General of Fiji from 1948 to 1951 (1911–2004)

The Honourable Brian André Doyle

18th Attorney General of Fiji
- In office 1949–1956
- Monarchs: George VI; Elizabeth II
- Governor: Sir Brian Freeston; Sir Ronald Garvey
- Preceded by: John Henry Vaughan
- Succeeded by: Ashley Greenwood

2nd Solicitor General of Fiji
- In office 1948–1951
- Monarch: George VI
- Governor: Sir Brian Freeston
- Preceded by: Alistair Forbes
- Succeeded by: Philip N. Dalton

1st Chief Justice of Zambia
- In office 1969–1975
- President: Kenneth Kaunda
- Preceded by: None (new office)

Judge, Botswana Court of Appeal
- In office 1973–1979
- President: Sir Seretse Khama

Judge, Botswana Court of Appeal
- In office 1988–1991
- President: Quett Masire

Personal details
- Born: 10 May 1911 Moulmein, Burma, British India
- Died: 30 October 2004 (aged 93) Brazil
- Education: Trinity College, Dublin

Brian André Doyle was a lawyer who was Attorney General of Fiji and Chief Justice of Zambia.

He served in Fiji as Solicitor General from 1948 to 1951, and as Attorney General from 1949 to 1956 (his tenure in these two offices evidently overlapped).

Later he was Chief Justice of Zambia from 1969 to 1975. He went on to serve two terms as a Judge of the Botswana Court of Appeal (1973 to 1979, and 1988 to 1991).

He died in Brazil at the home of his son. He also had a daughter there.

Legal offices
Preceded by Alistair Forbes	Solicitor General of Fiji; 11948-1951	Succeeded by Philip N. Dalton
Preceded by Edward Enoch Jenkins	Attorney General of Fiji; 1949-1956	Succeeded by Ashley Greenwood
Preceded by None (new office)	Chief Justice of Zambia; 1969-1975	Succeeded by
Preceded by	1st term Judge of the Botswana Court of Appeal; 1973-1979	Succeeded by
Preceded by	2nd term Judge of the Botswana Court of Appeal; 1988-1991	Succeeded by
