= Ashley Greenwood =

British soldier, lawyer and judge (1912–2003)

The Honourable Ashley Martin Greenwood OBE MC QC

19th Attorney General of Fiji
- In office 1956–1963
- Monarch: Elizabeth II
- Governor: Sir Ronald Garvey; Sir Kenneth Maddocks
- Preceded by: Brian Andre Doyle
- Succeeded by: Henry Roger Justin Lewis

4th Solicitor General of Fiji
- In office 1956–1956
- Monarch: Elizabeth II
- Governor: Sir Ronald Garvey
- Preceded by: William Gordon Bryce
- Succeeded by: Henry Roger Justin Lewis

Personal details
- Born: 12 June 1912 London, England
- Died: 30 September 2003 (aged 91)
- Spouse(s): Rosemary Howard; 24 April 1956 – 30 September 2003 (his death)
- Education: Clare College, Cambridge
- Profession: Lawyer, judge, soldier

Military service
- Unit: Royal Artillery

Ashley Martin Greenwood OBE MC QC (12 June 1912 – 30 September 2003) was a British soldier, lawyer, and judge. He served inter alia as Attorney General of Fiji and Attorney General of Gibraltar, as well as a judge in Uganda. He was also an accomplished mountaineer. He calculated that in his climbing, military and legal careers, he had spent time in 103 countries.

== Education ==
Educated initially at Haileybury College, Greenwood enrolled at Clare College, Cambridge, where he took a double first in Classics and graduated in Law.

In his student days, Greenwood developed a lifelong passion for mountaineering, scaling numerous peaks in the Alps, Dolomites, Tyrol, and Norway, as well as mountains closer to home in Scotland and Wales. He was elected to the Alpine Club at the age of 24. His mountaineering expertise proved crucial during his military service in the Second World War. He went on to marry a fellow-mountaineer. He celebrated his 80th birthday by scaling the 6121-meter high Stok Kangri Himalayan peak in Ladakh.

== Military service ==
Greenwood joined the Royal Artillery as a temporary Captain in 1940, with service number 132776. In April 1943, at a mountain warfare conference at Lochailort, Scotland, he was transferred to the New Zealand Squadron as a climbing instructor for mountain warfare. He accompanied the New Zealand Squadron in its ultimately doomed attempt to occupy the Italian-controlled Dodecanese Islands. Escaping to Turkey, he went on to become a liaison officer for the Long Range Desert Group of a British brigade in Montenegro in 1945. In June 1945, he joined the Allied Military Government Organization in Austria, serving until March 1946. Shortly afterwards, he joined the Colonial Office. He was awarded the Military Cross in 1944.

== Legal career ==
Greenwood was appointed Deputy Registrar of the High Court of Uganda in 1946, becoming Registrar in 1947 and Resident Magistrate in 1950.

Called to the bar at London's Inner Temple in 1952, Greenwood became a Crown Counsel in 1954. After serving briefly as Solicitor General of Fiji in 1956, he became Attorney General later that year, serving until 1963, when he became Attorney General of Gibraltar. He later filled in as Acting Attorney General of Montserrat, as well as a legal adviser in Hong Kong. He was also to spend a year in Washington, D.C. as an adviser to the Telstar Conference.

== Personal life ==
Greenwood married fellow-mountaineer Rosemary Farmborough Howard in 1956. They had first climbed together before the war. Up until 1978, they together climbed mountains in New Zealand, Austria, Italy, Greece, Nepal, India and Peru. They both belonged to the Eagle Ski Club.

Legal offices
Preceded by William Gordon Bryce	Solicitor General of Fiji; 1956	Succeeded by Justin Lewis
Preceded by Brian Andre Doyle	Attorney General of Fiji; 1956–1963	Succeeded by Justin Lewis
