= Anirudh Singh =

Anirudh Singh may refer to:

- Anirudh Singh (activist), Fijian scientist and social critic
- Anirudh Singh (politician) (born 1977), member of the Himachal Pradesh Legislative Assembly
- Anirudh Singh (cricketer) (born 1980), Indian cricketer

== See also ==
- Aniruddh Singh, Indian television actor
