= Anirudh Singh (activist) =

Fijian physicist and activist (born1950)

Dr Anirudh Singh is a Fiji Indian academic who has undertaken research on muon implantation in solids but is best known for the stand he has taken on national issues, in particular those relating to social inequities in Fiji, resulting from the 1987 military take-over of the Fijian Government.

== Early life and education ==
Singh was born in Yalalevu, Ba, Fiji on 3 May 1950. He is a descendant of Indian indentured labourers brought to Fiji between 1879 and 1916, to develop Fiji's economy and prevent the exploitation of native Fijians. He started school at the local Arya Samaj primary school and then moved to the nearby Methodist Mission School to complete his primary education. His secondary education was at Xavier College in Ba. He then enrolled at the University of the South Pacific, graduating with a Bachelor of Science in 1972.

After a short stint as physics teacher at his old school, Xavier College, Singh took up a teaching position at the Derrick Technical Institute (now known as the Fiji Institute of Technology). His desire for further education took him to the University of Auckland, where he graduated with Master of Science. He returned to Fiji in 1982 and took up a lectureship in Physics at the University of the South Pacific.

== Member of the Fiji Labour Party ==
Singh was disappointed with the racial politics of the two major political parties in Fiji and was one of the first people in Fiji to express a need for a completely new non-racial political organisation in Fiji. He strongly supported the formation of the Fiji Labour Party (FLP) in 1985. He was one of the candidates for the FLP in the November 1985 election for the Suva City Council, in which the FLP won eight of the 20 seats. Singh stood in the safe Alliance ward of Muanikau but lost by only a narrow margin.

When talks began for a coalition between the National Federation Party (NFP) and the Fiji Labour Party, Singh openly expressed his opposition. He released the results of a survey, which demonstrated that FLP could win 26 seats on its own. His main concern was that a coalition with NFP would destroy Labour's multiracial image and undermine its efforts to win greater Fijian support. Singh's survey was designed to rally anti-coalition support at the first FLP convention in Lautoka in July 1986, but the convention decided to give the party's Management Board a free hand to negotiate possible areas of co-operation with the NFP.

== Post coup Fiji ==
In 1986 Singh left for the United Kingdom under an Association of Commonwealth Universities scholarship to pursue a PhD degree which he subsequently obtained from the University of Leicester in 1990. On his return to Fiji in 1990 he found that Fiji had undergone a huge change during his three-year sabbatical. The 1970 constitution had been abrogated, there was little freedom of speech and the majority of the community lived in fear as the rule of law had broken down. Fiji was ostensibly being ruled by an interim government with Ratu Sir Penaia Ganilau as President and Ratu Sir Kamisese Mara as Prime Minister but the military held a strong grip on the affairs of the nation, and called all the shots. After the failure of the interim government to have two versions of its proposed constitution accepted by all people in Fiji, the country was in a political stalemate.

The announcement on the night of 25 July 1990 by the president of Fiji of a new constitution came as a complete shock to many of the people of Fiji as it had happened without any prelude. Initially, those opposed to the imposition of the new constitution, and brave enough to express their views, began expressing their opposition to the new constitution through letters to the media. But the interim government was adamant that the constitution was there to stay and did everything in its power to create an impression that the unilaterally-imposed Constitution had been accepted by all citizens of Fiji.

== Group Against Racial Discrimination ==
To co-ordinate efforts against the imposition which was regarded as unjust, it was decided to form a pressure group, known as Group Against Racial Discrimination (GARD). This was a loose grouping of like-thinking individuals, most of whom were University of the South Pacific (USP) academics including Singh, who had the common desire to see the restoration of a democratic government in the country after the 1970 constitution had been abrogated by Major-General Rabuka. Their main aim was to bring the plight of the people of Fiji to the notice of the free world through letters and other means of communication. Efforts towards the local campaign quickly became ineffectual after the media began refusing to publish the letters.

GARD decided that a better way to demonstrate its opposition was by burning copies of the constitution. This had been tried a couple of times earlier, however, these actions had been largely ineffective as they had failed to gain any publicity. To gain widespread publicity in Fiji, and internationally, it was decided to carry out the protest during celebrations for the Diwali Festival, also known as the festival of lights, celebrated by Hindus. The protest was implemented on Thursday, 18 October 1990 in Suva. After a short speech by Singh, a copy of the constitution was burnt. The protest was duly reported in the Daily Post the next day, with the front-page headline saying "Hindus burn constitution". The interim government called an emergency cabinet meeting. It condemned the protest, and released a statement calling the action "treasonous and despicable". It asked the police to investigate.

== Abduction ==
Despite precautions by members of the group, on the morning of Wednesday, 24 October 1990, Singh was abducted while on his way to work. He was blind-folded and taken to a forest in hills outside Suva called Colo-i-Suva. He was gagged and severely beaten and interrogated for 12 hours. His captors then left him in the dark and disappeared. Somehow, he made his way to a road and was driven to safety by a passing taxi. He had incurred severe injuries to his face and hands and needed to travel to Australia for medical treatment.

On 22 November 1990, five members of the Special Operations Security Unit of the Republic of Fiji Military Forces pleaded guilty to the abduction and torture of Singh and were sentenced to 12 months imprisonment suspended for 15 months. The army denied that the five had acted on its orders and even sent them on peace keeping duties overseas.

Singh has written an account of his experience in the book, Silent Warriors.

== High Court ruling ==
Singh sued the five and the attorney general and after a thirteen-year delay, on 1 November 2006, the High Court of Fiji ruled in favour of Singh. In his judgement, Justice R.J. Coventry said "I do find that there were tortious acts as pleaded in the Statement of Claim committed by the first five defendants. I do not find that the defence under section 52 of the Royal Fiji Military Forced Act is available to the five defendants nor consequently the sixth defendant. I find that the tortious acts committed by the five defendants were so closely connected with their employment and in particular the functions and purposes of the Special Operations Security Unit that the sixth defendant, representing the State, is vicariously liable for those tortious acts."

Singh, speaking to Fiji Live said he has finally found closure as the matter has been in the judicial system for 13 years. "People have been asking me, is it about the money? Money is not important. What's important is the fact that we have proved ourselves that we were right. Today's ruling has set a precedent and is clearly a landmark case that will definitely have positive ramifications. There are many others that were tortured during the period after the 1987 coup."

On 6 September 2007, Singh was awarded $793,022 as compensation by the High Court. Judge Justice Roger Coventry ruled that the State, and the soldiers involved, pay Singh the money. Justice Coventry said that he regarded Singh's original claim of $25,000 for exemplary damages "too modest" given the circumstances of the case. He is still not being paid $793,022 since 2007 to 2013.

== The meaning of democracy ==
Singh has never shied away from speaking on issues affecting the citizens of Fiji. Following the 2006 military coup in Fiji, he has, in a letter published in a local newspaper, defined "democracy" in the context of the situation in Fiji. He has argued that even if a Government is elected by constitutional means, it is not democracy "when the outcome of the process brings about oppression of a large section of the country" – referring to the policies of the Qarase Government that he says overtly discriminated against the Indo-Fijians. On the military coup, he has stated that "history is full of examples where equal rights for all could only eventuate through illegal, and indeed criminal acts."

== Publications ==
- Singh, Anirudh (1991). Silent Warriors. Fiji Institute of Applied Studies. ISBN 982-301-001-3.

== See also ==
- Group Against Racial Discrimination
