= General Vaughan =

General Vaughan may refer to:

- Alfred Jefferson Vaughan Jr. (1830–1899), Confederate States Army brigadier general
- Harry H. Vaughan (1893–1981), U.S. Army Reserve major general
- John Vaughan (British Army officer, died 1795) (c. 1731–1795), British Army lieutenant general
- John Vaughan (British Army officer, born 1871) (1871–1956), British Army major general
- Louis Vaughan (1875–1942), British Indian Army lieutenant general

== See also ==
- Clyde A. Vaughn (born 1946), U.S. Army lieutenant general
- John C. Vaughn (1824–1875), Confederate States Army brigadier general
- Attorney General Vaughan (disambiguation)
