= Ghananand Mishra =

Fijian lawyer and judge (1916–2005)

Ghananand Mishra (1916 – April 2005) was a Fijian lawyer and judge. He is a legal luminary and a contemporary of Jai Ram Reddy.

== Career ==
Mishra served as Director of Public Prosecutions before his appointment to the High Court as a puisne judge. His interpretations of criminal law were pivotal in the development of Fiji's justice system. In 1973, the Leader of the Opposition nominated Mishra for the position of Chief Justice, in opposition to Sir Ronald Kermode, who was favoured by the government. In the end, Governor-General Ratu Sir George Cakobau appointed Sir Timoci Tuivaga instead.

Mishra resigned from the bench in 1987 following the coup on 14 May, led by Lieutenant Colonel Sitiveni Rabuka, saying, "I will not serve under those bandits."

In retirement, Mishra faded from public view. He devoted his time to his family, and to his lifelong passion of reading. He also made occasional trips to India.

Vice-President Ratu Joni Madraiwiwi called Mishra "a fortress of rectitude and integrity that was never breached.".

He finds a mention in Lallan Rai's Hindi book.
