= William Ewart Donnelly =

New Zealander teacher (1900–1975)

William Ewart Donnelly (27 December 1900 – 15 September 1975) was a New Zealander who became a teacher and General Secretary of the Students’ Christian Movement in New Zealand, in the early 1930s and early 40s. He volunteered for service in Fiji and he served as principal of the Methodist Church's Toorak Boys' High School in Suva.

In late 1942, the Pacific Campaign of World War II was at its peak and the Colonial Authority was issued a command that all urban schools should close and surrender their compounds for use as military camps for forces fighting the Japanese threat.

Other overseas teachers immediately left Fiji to await the end of the war elsewhere. But Donnelly, the determined missionary principal, sent a circular to all members of the senior classes of Classes Six, Seven, and Eight of Toorak Boys School, inviting volunteers to accompany him to continue their education. After consultation with the heads of the Methodist Church, he received permission to use the Principal's residence at the Davuilevu Technical School, in Nausori. As a result, he and 50 volunteers from Toorak Boys School, met at the Principal's residence on 3 March 1943. Their first classrooms were the two master bedrooms with the long verandah on the east side of the structure serving as the library. There were only two classes and the only teacher in addition to Donnelly was Semesa Sikivou. During the 1943 Methodist Church Annual Conference, Donnelly received permission to expand his classes along the same ridge and as a result, the boys themselves, with his guidance, built three large bures, where the teachers staff quarters presently stand.

He remained principal of Lelean Memorial School from 1943 until 1945, when he returned to New Zealand. Donnelly returned to Fiji to establish Ratu Sir Lala Sukuna Memorial School in Suva, where he served for three years.

He then served at Levuka Public School, on Ovalau, for one year in 1970 before returning to Lelean in 1971 after the Ms. Furnival tragedy. Under Donnelly's guidance, the Lelean school motto, “Seek wisdom and spiritual understanding” was formulated.

William Donnelly was born in Thames, New Zealand, 27 December 1900. He died 15 September 1975 at Green Lane Hospital, Auckland, New Zealand after a short illness. He was married to Ella Mildred Fowler, with whom he had two children, Helen Janette and William Grant Donnelly.
