= Udit Narayan (politician) =

Fijian politician

Member of House of Representatives (Fiji) Lautoka Rural Indian Communal Constituency
- In office 2001–2006
- Preceded by: Anand Kumar Singh
- Succeeded by: vacant

Minister for Primary and Preventive Health Services
- In office 2006–2006

Personal details
- Born: 1960
- Died: 21 June 2017 (aged 57) Lautoka, Fiji
- Party: Fiji Labour Party

Udit Narayan (1960 – 21 June 2017) was a Fijian politician of Indian descent. He represented the Lautoka Rural Indian Communal Constituency, one of 19 reserved for Indo-Fijians, which he held for the Fiji Labour Party (FLP) in the parliamentary elections of 2001 with more than 71 percent of the vote.

In 2003, Narayan was offered the portfolio of Ministry for Employment Opportunities, together with 13 other FLP parliamentarians who were offered cabinet positions by the Prime Minister, Laisenia Qarase but the FLP refused to accept this offer.

In the subsequent election held on 6–13 May 2006, he retained his seat with over 77 percent. Following this victory, he was appointed Minister for Primary and Preventive Health Services, one of nine FLP Ministers in the multi-party Cabinet that was formed. Narayan, together with three other FLP cabinet members, voted against the 2007 budget and was asked to resign by the then Prime Minister, Laisenia Qarase.

Narayan was a Fiji Sugar Corporation traffic supervisor.

He died on 21 June 2017 at the Lautoka Hospital after a short illness.
