= Lautoka Rural (Indian Communal Constituency, Fiji) =

Former electoral constituency in Fiji

Lautoka Indian Communal is a former electoral division of Fiji, one of 19 communal constituencies reserved for Indo-Fijians. Established by the 1997 Constitution, it came into being in 1999 and was used for the parliamentary elections of 1999, 2001, and 2006. (Of the remaining 52 seats, 27 were reserved for other ethnic communities and 25, called Open Constituencies, were elected by universal suffrage). The electorate covered the rural hinterland of Lautoka City in the west of the main island of Viti Levu.

The 2013 Constitution promulgated by the Military-backed interim government abolished all constituencies and established a form of proportional representation, with the entire country voting as a single electorate.

== Election results ==
In the following tables, the primary vote refers to first-preference votes cast. The final vote refers to the final tally after votes for low-polling candidates have been progressively redistributed to other candidates according to pre-arranged electoral agreements (see electoral fusion), which may be customized by the voters (see instant run-off voting).

=== 1999 ===
Candidate	Political party	Votes	%
Anand Kumar Singh	Fiji Labour Party (FLP)	5,422	65.92
Asmat Khan	National Federation Party (NFP)	2,387	34.08
Total		8,225	100.00

=== 2001 ===
Candidate	Political party	Votes	%
Udit Narayan	Fiji Labour Party (FLP)	5,205	71.08
Vishwa Nandan	National Federation Party (NFP)	2,104	28.73
Naren Prasad	Germit Heritage Party (GHP)	14	0.19
Total		7,323	100.00

=== 2006 ===
Candidate	Political party	Votes	%
Udit Narayan	Fiji Labour Party (FLP)	6,832	77.18
Naren Prasad	National Federation Party (NFP)	1,643	18.56
Mohammed Shameem	Soqosoqo Duavata ni Lewenivanua (SDL)	252	2.85
Deo Kumar	National Alliance Party (NAPF)	125	1.41
Total		8,852	100.00

== Sources ==
- Psephos - Adam Carr's electoral archive
- Fiji Facts
