= Napolioni Dawai =

Fijian chief and politician

Member of the Senate
- In office 1970–1976, 1982–1986

Member of the House of Representatives
- In office 1977–1982
- Succeeded by: Apisai Tora
- Constituency: Ba–Nadi Fijian Communal

Personal details
- Died: 17 November 1986 (aged 65) Nadi, Fiji

Ratu Napolioni Naulia Dawai CBE (died 17 November 1986) was a Fijian chief and politician. He served as a member of the Senate and House of Representatives from 1970 to 1986.

== Biography ==
Dawai was educated at the Queen Victoria School. He joined the civil service in the Fijian Affairs Department, but was unable to fit in and subsequently transferred several times before joining the Fijian Military Forces and serving in Malaya. After being overlooked for an officer's course, he left the army and was appointed as a magistrate. He became the holder of the chiefly title Tui Nadi and served as Roko Tui of Ba Province and later chairman of Ba Provincial Council. In 1970 he was appointed to the new Senate as a nominee of the Great Council of Chiefs for a six-year term.

He successfully contested the March 1977 elections to the House of Representatives as an Alliance Party candidate in the Ba–Nadi Fijian communal constituency, and was appointed Assistant Minister responsible for Forests. He was re-elected in the September 1977 elections. However, in 1981 he resigned from the Alliance Party in protest at a lack of funds for western Fiji, and joined the Western United Front. After losing his seat in the 1982 elections, he was appointed to the Senate as one of the nominees of the Leader of the Opposition. In 1984 he was appointed to the shadow cabinet. He also served as vice chairman of the Sugar Cane Growers Council, and was awarded a CBE in the 1986 Birthday Honours.

Dawai died in November 1986 in a road accident when his car hit an electrical pole. He was survived by his wife and seven children.
