= Naomi Matanitobua =

Chief Magistrate of Fiji
- In office 14 December 2005 – 20 April 2009
- Preceded by: David Balram
- Succeeded by: Ajmal Khan

Naomi Matanitobua is a former Fijian judge, who took office as Chief Magistrate of Fiji on 14 December 2005, succeeding David Balram. Her term of appointment was for three years.

== Life ==
Matanitobua's first application for the position, in 2002, was not successful. She was determined to dispel the impression, she said, that women cannot occupy senior judicial offices.

Her legal career began as a temporary relieving court clerk in 1980. By 1999, she had become a resident magistrate. In 2020 she was still authorised to practise.

== 2006 coup d'état ==
In the wake of the military coup which deposed the Qarase government on 5 December 2006, Matanitobua was sent on paid leave until further notice, along with Chief Justice Daniel Fatiaki, on 3 January 2007. The military administration said it wanted to conduct an investigation into the judiciary. The investigation would cover allegations that members of the judiciary had been implicated in 2000 Fijian coup d'état.

Matanitobua returned to work as chief magistrate in March 2007. She was removed from office following the abrogation of the 1997 Constitution of Fiji by the military regime in 2009. She was replaced as Chief Magistrate by Ajmal Khan.

Following her sacking she returned to legal work, defending Teimumu Kepa when she was charged with conspiracy by the military regime over plans to hold the annual Methodist Church conference.

Preceded by David Balram	Chief Magistrate of Fiji	Succeeded by
