= Ransley Thacker =

British lawyer and judge (1891–1966)

The Honourable Ransley Samuel Thacker KC

15th Attorney General of Fiji
- In office December 1933 – 1938
- Monarchs: George V Edward VIII; George VI
- Governor: Sir Arthur Fletcher; Cecil Barton(Acting); Sir Arthur Richards
- Preceded by: Charles Gough Howell
- Succeeded by: Edward Enoch Jenkins

Chief Justice of Saint Vincent and the Grenadines
- Monarch: George V
- Governor: Herbert Walter Peebles

Justice of the Supreme Court of Kenya
- In office 1938–1950
- Monarch: George VI
- Governor: Sir Robert Brooke-Popham; Walter Harragin(Acting); Sir Henry Moore(Acting); Gilbert McCall Rennie(Acting); Sir Philip Mitchell

First Class Magistrate
- In office 1952–1953
- Monarch: Elizabeth II
- Governor: Sir Evelyn Baring
- Preceded by: None (new office)
- Succeeded by: None (office abolished)

Personal details
- Born: 1891 Nottingham, United Kingdom
- Died: 3 January 1966 Chipunga, Rhodesia
- Spouse(s): Olive Frances Braithwaite m. 1915
- Children: 1 daughter, 1 son
- Occupation: Lawyer, Jurist

Ransley Samuel Thacker QC (1891 – 3 January 1966) was a British lawyer and judge. Employed in the colonial service, he served as Chief Justice of St Vincent (1931–1933), Attorney General of Fiji (1933-1938), and as a judge in British Kenya. He is best known for the jailing of Jomo Kenyatta.

== Legal and political career ==
In the early 1930s, Thacker served as Chief Justice of St Vincent, and was serving in that role as of 7 July 1933.

Thacker took up the post of Attorney General of Fiji at the end of 1933, passing through Sydney en route to Suva on 21 December.

Thacker served as judge on the Supreme Court of British Kenya from 1938 to 1950. He retired to Nairobi on a £474 pension, which he supplemented by practicing law. He was called out of retirement on 17 November 1952, however, as a First Class Magistrate to preside over the trial of the Kapenguria Six — Jomo Kenyatta and five others accused of organizing the Mau Mau movement. He was bribed for £20,000 by Governor Evelyn Baring from an emergency fund, as were the fabricated witnesses from the Attorney-General's office's funds. On 8 April 1953, Thacker sentenced them to seven years' hard labour. In his summing up, Thacker declared:

You have successfully plunged many Africans back to a state which shows little humanity. You have persuaded them in secret to murder, burn and commit atrocities which will take many years to forget.

He added:

You have let loose upon this land a flood of misery and unhappiness affecting the daily lives of the races in it, including your own people.

Kenyatta remained imprisoned until 14 April 1959, and his civil rights were not fully restored until August 1961.

== Personal life ==
Thacker was the son of Henry Thacker and Eliza Jackson.

In 1915, Thacker married Olive Frances Braithwaite in London. They had three children, Daphne Elinor (born 1917), Derek (born c.1919) and Derwent Allan (born 1921).
