= Richard Vaughan (historian) =

British historian and ornithologist (1927-2014)

Richard Vaughan (9 July 1927 – 4 March 2014) was a British historian and ornithologist. Specialising in medieval history, he was Professor of History first at the University of Hull (1965–1981) and then at the University of Groningen (1981–1989). His most significant work was a four-volume history of the late medieval Dukes of Burgundy. He also developed an international reputation for his ornithological expertise and writings.

== Early life ==
Vaughan was born in Maidenhead on 9 July 1927. His father was John Henry Vaughan, a Colonial Office lawyer who would serve as Chief Justice of Fiji between 1945 and 1949. Richard Vaughan attended Eastbourne College. After completion of National Service, he obtained a "double First" at Corpus Christi College, Cambridge, and became a Fellow of the college in 1953.

== Academic career ==
In 1958, while a fellow at Corpus Christi, Vaughan published his study of Matthew Paris which became the standard work on the medieval chronicler. In 1965, he took up the post of Professor of History at the University of Hull. Between 1962 and 1976 he wrote his most important work, a four volume history of the late medieval Dukes of Burgundy. C. A. J. Armstrong described it as "a major achievement in European historiography, … probably no one has produced an equally comprehensive survey of Burgundian power between 1364 and 1477." Historian Graeme Small described Vaughan as part of a "golden generation" of historians of France's late medieval period.

In 1981 he moved to the University of Groningen in the Netherlands to become its Professor of Medieval History. He had also developed an interest in the Arctic and became Chair of the University of Groningen Arctic Centre, writing histories of the Arctic and north west Greenland. Following his retirement in 1989, he served as visiting professor at the Central Michigan University for one year.

Vaughan was founding editor of the Journal of Medieval History (from 1975 to 1987). He was also a noted linguist and translator, and spoke thirteen languages. He was founding editor of North-Holland Medieval Translations.

== Ornithology ==
Vaughan also had an international reputation as an ornithologist. He was particularly known for his work on the rare Eleonora's falcon. In 2005, he wrote, with his daughter, Nancy Vaughan Jennings, the standard work on the Stone-curlew.

== Personal life ==
Vaughan married Margaret Morris in 1955 and they had 6 children. He spent his retirement initially in the North York Moors and, from 1996, in Somerset. He died on 4 March 2014.

== Publications ==
Vaughan's published works include:

=== History ===
- Matthew Paris, Cambridge University Press, 1958.
- Philip the Bold: The Formation of the Burgundian State, Longman, 1962 (UK); Harvard University Press, 1962 (U.S.); new edition, Boydell & Brewer, 2002.
- John the Fearless: The Growth of Burgundian Power, Longman, 1966 (UK); Barnes & Noble, 1966 (U.S.); new edition, Boydell & Brewer, 2002.
- Philip the Good: The Apogee of Burgundy, Longman, 1970 (UK); Barnes & Noble, 1970 (U.S.); new edition, Boydell & Brewer, 2002.
- Charles the Bold: The Last Valois Duke of Burgundy, Longman, 1974 (UK); Barnes & Noble, 1974 (U.S.); new edition, Boydell & Brewer, 2002.
- Valois Burgundy, Allen Lane, 1975 (UK); Archon, 1975 (U.S.)
- Post-war Integration in Europe: Documents of Modern History, Edward Arnold, 1976 (UK); St. Martin's, 1976 (U.S.)
- Twentieth-Century Europe: Paths to Unity, Croom Helm, 1979 (UK); Barnes & Noble, 1979 (U.S.)
- Chronicles of Matthew Paris: Monastic Life in the Thirteenth Century, edited, translated and introduced by Richard Vaughan, Alan Sutton, 1984 (UK); St. Martin's, 1984 (U.S.)
- Northwest Greenland: A History, University of Maine Press, 1991.
- The Arctic: A History, Alan Sutton, 1994; revised edition, 2007.

=== Ornithology ===
- Gulls in Britain, H.F. and G. Witherby, 1972
- Birds of the Yorkshire Coast, Hendon Publishing, 1974.
- Arctic Summer: Birds in North Norway, Nelson, 1979.
- Plovers, Dalton, 1980.
- In Search of Arctic Birds, Poyser, 1992.
- Seabird City: A Guide to the Breeding Seabirds of the Flamborough Headland, Smith Settle, 1998.
- The Stone Curlew, Burhinus oedicnemus, Isabelline Books, 2005 (with Nancy Vaughan Jennings).
- Wings and Rings: A History of Bird Migration Studies in Europe, Isabelline Books, 2009.
