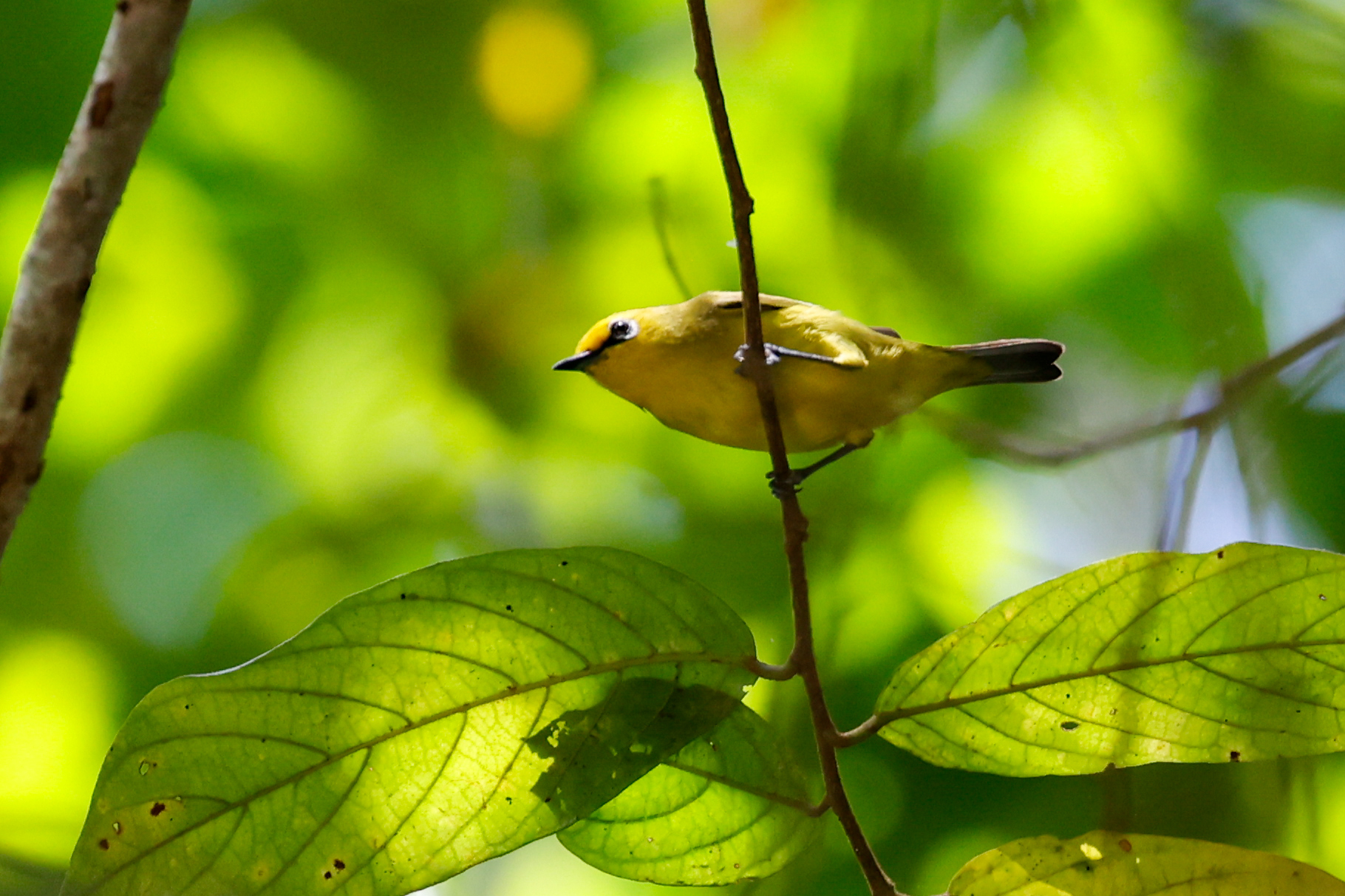

Conservation status
- Least Concern (IUCN 3.1)

Scientific classification
- Kingdom: Animalia
- Phylum: Chordata
- Class: Aves
- Order: Passeriformes
- Family: Zosteropidae
- Genus: Zosterops
- Species: Z. vaughani

Binomial name
- Zosterops vaughani Bannerman, 1924

= Pemba white-eye =

Species of bird

The Pemba white-eye (Zosterops vaughani) is a species of bird in the family Zosteropidae. It is endemic to Tanzania.

Its natural habitats are subtropical or tropical dry forests, subtropical or tropical moist lowland forests, subtropical or tropical mangrove forests, and dry savanna.

== History ==
The Pemba white-eye derives its scientific name, Zosterops vaughani, from John Henry Vaughan, after whom it was named.
