= Charles Gough Howell =

Welsh lawyer and British colonial official

The Honourable Charles Gough Howell KC

14th Attorney General of Fiji
- In office 16 November 1931 – 1933
- Monarch: George V
- Governor: Sir Arthur Fletcher
- Preceded by: Sir Percy McElwaine
- Succeeded by: Ransley Thacker

13th Attorney-General of Singapore
- In office 11 August 1936 – 14 February 1942
- Monarchs: Edward VIII; George VI
- Governor: Sir Shenton Thomas
- Preceded by: Newnham Arthur Worley (Acting)
- Succeeded by: Ichihara Kakka

Personal details
- Born: 1894 Cardiff, Wales
- Died: 12 September 1942 (aged 47–48) Taiwan Camp, Taiwan
- Spouse: Sidney Gretchen Innes-Noad
- Children: 1 daughter, 1 son
- Education: University of Cambridge

Military service
- Rank: Lieutenant
- Unit: Royal Field Artillery
- Battles/wars: Battle of Loos

Charles Gough Howell (1894 – 12 September 1942) was a Welsh lawyer and British colonial official, who served as Attorney General of Fiji from 1931 to 1933, and as Attorney-General of Singapore from 1936 to 1942.

== Early life and family background ==
Howell was the son of William Gough Howell. He was educated at Cambridge University, and was subsequently admitted to the bar in London.

Sometime before 15 June 1918, he was married to Sidney Gretchen Innes-Noad of Australia, with whom he had a daughter, Rosemary (born 1920–1921). They also had a son, William Gough (Bill) (1922–1974), an Oxford-educated architect who served in the Royal Air Force in the Middle East during the Second World War.

== Military service ==
On 23 November 1914, Howell was named a temporary Lieutenant in the Royal Field Artillery. He served in this role from 1914 through 1917, and again in 1925. He was seriously wounded in the Battle of Loos.

== Legal and political career ==
After a brief period as Acting Solicitor General of Kenya (from December 1928 to 9 June 1930), Howell became Attorney General of Fiji and an ex officio member of the Legislative Council on 16 November 1931. His appointment coincided with that of James Russell (Director of Education).

He was confirmed as a nominated member of the Legislative Council in 1933. His reappointment coincided with the appointment of Arthur Leopold Armstrong (Acting Secretary for Native Affairs), Wilfred Wise (Commissioner of Works), and Lieutenant Colonel Joseph Samuel Gamble (Inspector General of Constabulary, and Commandant, Fiji Defence Force).

After being appointed Attorney General of Singapore on 11 August 1936, he was named His Majesty's Counsel for the Straits Settlements on 13 July 1937. He remained Attorney General until 14 February 1942.

== Death ==
Howell was taken prisoner of war by Japan during the Second World War. He died of dysentery in Taiwan Camp, Formosa, on either 12 September 1942

Legal offices
Preceded by	Acting; Solicitor General of Kenya; 1930	Succeeded by
Preceded by Sir Percy McElwaine	Attorney-General of Fiji; 1931–1933	Succeeded by Ransley Thacker
Preceded by Acting; Newnham Arthur Worley	Attorney-General of Singapore; 1936–1942	Succeeded by Kensatku-Kan (Attorney-General and Public Prosecutor of the Japanese Administration); Ichihari Kakka
