= Muniswamy Mudaliar =

Fijian politician (died 1942)

Member of the Legislative Council for Northern and Western
- In office 1932–1937
- Preceded by: Parmanand Singh
- Succeeded by: Chattur Singh

Personal details
- Born: British India North Arcot
- Died: 23 December 1942 Suva, Fiji
- Profession: Teacher, farmer, shopkeeper

Muniswamy Mudaliar (Tamil: முனிசாமி முதலியார்) (died 23 December 1942) was an Indo-Fijian politician who was a member of the Legislative Council from 1932 to 1937. In 1933 he became Fiji's first Indo-Fijian Justice of the Peace.

== Biography ==
Mudaliar was born in North Arcot district of southern India and worked as a teacher in Ceylon before moving to Fiji in 1916 to work in agriculture. He became President of the Madras Sangam, which built the largest Indian school in Fiji.

From 1929 to 1932 the three seats reserved for Indo-Fijians in the Legislative Council were vacant due to a boycott of the Council, led by Vishnu Deo, in protest of the failure of the community to be granted a common roll with Europeans. When elections were called in 1932, Deo called for the boycott to continue. However, after a rebel Indo-Fijian put themselves forward as a candidate for the Southern Constituency, Deo nominated K. B. Singh to oppose them. Deo wanted Singh to move a motion for common roll when he was elected, and, aware that he would need a seconder for the motion, he nominated Mudaliar to stand in the Northern and Western Division, where he was elected unopposed.

On 14 October 1932 Singh put forward a motion for common roll, seconded by Mudaliar. The Governor convinced the two to withdraw the motion so that he could discuss it with the Secretary of State. Contrary to Deo's advice, the motion was withdrawn. In February 1933, the Secretary of State informed the Legislative Council that it was impracticable to have common roll. Singh resigned and was re-elected over the same rival in by-election, but Mudaliar refused to resign. Singh took his seat in the Legislative Council, contrary to Vishnu Deo's instructions and the two evaded the common roll issue. They were denounced in public meetings organised by Deo and his associates, but Mudaliar was rewarded by the Government by being made Fiji's first Indo-Fijian Justice of Peace.

On 23 March 1934, Mudaliar and Singh introduced another motion for common roll which was defeated but its consequence was that new motion could not be introduced immediately after next election. Fully aware that they would not be able to retain their seats in the next election, Singh and Mudaliar accepted the Governor’s advice and moved a motion calling for members of the Legislative Council to be nominated and not elected. The motion was passed but the Colonial Office implemented a compromise, combining election and nomination. The Legislative Council was increased to 31, made up of 15 unofficial members, made up of 5 members from each ethnic group, and 16 official members (usually heads of departments). All the Fijian seats were to be nominated by the Great Council of Chiefs, but three each of the Indian and European seats were to be elected on communal franchise and the remaining two filled through nomination.

Mudaliar and Singh did not stand in the 1937 elections, although Singh was nominated into the Legislative Council by the Governor. He died in the Colonial War Memorial Hospital in Suva on 23 December 1942.
