= Apaitia Seru =

The Honourable Apaitia Seru

29th Attorney General of Fiji
- In office 1992–1992
- President: Ratu Sir Penaia Ganilau
- Prime Minister: Sitiveni Rabuka
- Preceded by: Sailosi Kepa
- Succeeded by: Kelemedi Bulewa

Member of Parliament for Kadavu Fijian
- In office 1992–1994

Personal details
- Profession: Lawyer, Judge

Apaitia Seru is a Fijian lawyer and former politician and judge, who served briefly as Attorney General of Fiji in 1992. He was also a member of the House of Representatives from 1992 to 1994. He held the Kadavu Fijian Communal Constituency for the Soqosoqo ni Vakavulewa ni Taukei

In April 2006, the Fiji Law Society fined him US$6000 for improper handling of a client's trust fund.

Prior to serving as Attorney General, Seru had been a magistrate, and for a time, Chief Magistrate.

== Personal life ==
Seru is a devout Christian and a member of the Full Gospel Business Men's Fellowship International.

Legal offices
Preceded by Sailosi Kepa	Attorney General of Fiji; 1992	Succeeded by Kelemedi Bulewa
Political offices
Preceded by	Member of the House of Representatives; 1992-1994	Succeeded by
