= Tui Nadi =

Tui Nadi (or I Nakuruvarua, Navatulevu, na Momo na Tui Nadi in full) is the title of the Paramount Chief of Nadi, in Fiji. The Tui Nadi hails from the village of Narewa, and exercises chiefly authority over the subdistricts of Nadi (Narewa, Nakavu, Namotomoto, Navoci, and Dratabu villages) and Sikituru (Sikituru, Moala, Yavunsania, Korovuto villages).

The title has been in dispute between two contenders for the many years. Ratu Kaliova Dawai and his kinsman Ratu Napolioni Dawai have each been installed by factions loyal to them. The matter was slowly making its way through the courts, and a judgement was originally expected in 2006. This was put on hold, however, in the wake of the military coup of 5 December 2006.
