= Alipate Qetaki =

Fijian lawyer

The Honourable Alipate Qetaki

Judge of the Court of Appeal of Fiji
- Incumbent
- Assumed office 19 April 2023

27th Attorney-General of Fiji
- In office May 1987 – September 1987
- Monarch: Elizabeth II
- Governor General: Ratu Sir Penaia Ganilau
- Preceded by: Jai Ram Reddy
- Succeeded by: Sailosi Kepa
- In office 2000–2001
- President: Ratu Josefa Iloilo
- Prime Minister: Laisenia Qarase
- Preceded by: Anand Singh
- Succeeded by: Qoriniasi Bale

6th Chairman, Fiji Law Reform Commission
- In office 2003–2008
- President: Ratu Josefa Iloilo
- Prime Minister: Laisenia Qarase; Frank Bainimarama
- Preceded by: Vacant since 1999; Last held by R. Matabalavu

Personal details
- Education: University of Edinburgh
- Profession: Judge

Alipate Qetaki is a Fijian jurist, civil servant, and former politician who currently serves as a judge of the Court of Appeal of Fiji. He previously served as Attorney General of Fiji in the government of Timoci Bavadra from May 1987 to September 1987, and again as Attorney General and Minister for Justice in the interim Cabinet formed by Laisenia Qarase in the wake of the 2000 Fijian coup d'état. He held office till an elected government took power in September 2001.

In August 2008, Qetaki was appointed by the military regime of Frank Bainimarama to the post of General Manager of the Native Land Trust Board, replacing Semi Tabakanalagi, who died in office. He held this position till April 2015, when he was succeeded by Tevita Kuruvakadua. He has also been a Director of Fiji Sugar Corporation since 26 November 2008. From 2020 to 2023 he taught law at the University of Fiji.

In April 2023 he was appointed as a judge of the Court of Appeal of Fiji. The appointment was opposed by the Fiji Law Society on the basis that he had previously been found guilty of professional misconduct as a lawyer and was thus ineligible to be appointed. The question of Qetaki's eligibility for appointment was referred to the Supreme Court of Fiji in June 2024. On 28 June 2024 the Supreme Court ruled that he was eligible for appointment, as his misconduct had been minimal.

Legal offices
Preceded by Jai Ram Reddy	1st time Attorney General of Fiji; 1987	Succeeded by Sailosi Kepa
Preceded by Anand Singh	2nd time Attorney General of Fiji; 2000–2001	Succeeded by Qoriniasi Bale
Vacant	Chairman, Fiji Law Reform Commission; 2003–present	Succeeded by
