= Robert Roden =

Sir Robert Blair Roden (21 April 1860 – 5 February 1939) was a British colonial judge. He was Chief Justice of St Vincent from 1912 to 1915 and Chief Justice of British Honduras from 1915 to 1921.

== Biography ==
Roden was born in Antigua, the son of J. James Roden, a sugar planter. He was educated at the Ewart Institute in Newton Stewart, Scotland.

Roden joined the Colonial Service in 1880. He was Magistrate of Nevis from 1890, Private Secretary to successive governors of the Leeward Islands in 1883, 1890, 1895, and 1896, He was a member of the St Kitt’s and Nevis Legislative Council from 1891, of the Federal Legislative Council of the Leeward Islands from 1898.

In 1903, he was called to the Bar by Gray's Inn and was appointed Police Magistrate of Bridgetown, Barbados the same year. He acted on several occasions as Judge of the Bridgetown Petty Debt Court and of the Barbados Assistant Court of Appeal.

He was appointed Chief Justice of St Vincent, 1912, administered the Government of St Vincent from October 1912 to February 1913, and for periods in 1913 and 1914. He was appointed Chief Justice of British Honduras in 1915, retiring in 1921. He was knighted in 1918. He died in London in 1939.

In 1890, Roden married Rachel Thomson Harrison, elder daughter of W. P. Harrison of Edinburgh; they had one daughter. Lady Roden died in 1936.
