= John Henry Vaughan =

English ornithologist (1892–1965)

The Honourable John Henry Vaughan MC KC (Fiji)

17th Attorney General of Fiji
- In office 1945–1949
- Monarch: George VI
- Governor: Sir Alexander Grantham; Sir John Nicoll; Sir Brian Freeston
- Richard Rankine; John Hall
- Preceded by: Edward Enoch Jenkins
- Succeeded by: Brian Andre Doyle

Attorney General Zanzibar
- In office 1930s–1930s
- Monarch: Khalifa bin Harub

Personal details
- Born: 9 February 1892
- Died: 16 April 1965 (aged 73)
- Spouse(s): Thelma Green m. 1925
- Children: John, Richard and Matthew Vaughan
- Education: Corpus Christi College, Cambridge
- Profession: Lawyer, Ornithologist

John Henry Vaughan, MC, QC (9 February 1892 – 16 April 1965) was a lawyer and ornithologist who served as Attorney General of Zanzibar and later as Attorney General of Fiji.

== Early life ==
Vaughan was educated at Eastbourne College and then studied law at Corpus Christi College, Cambridge.

== Career ==
He is best known for his work in the British Empire's legal service as Attorney General of Zanzibar in the 1930s, and then as Attorney General of Fiji from 1945 to 1949.

His work, The Dual Jurisdiction in Zanzibar, described the Protectorate's system of indirect British rule, whereby sovereignty technically remained with the Sultan of Zanzibar but with virtually all effective power in the hands of British-appointed officials.

He was also a botanist who collected plants from what is now Tanzania and Fiji. He put together an important collection of plants from Zanzibar and the eastern provinces of Tanganyika.

== Personal life ==
He married Thelma Green in 1925 and became a keen ornithologist. Their son was the eminent historian Richard Vaughan, who was also a noted ornithologist.

== Legacy ==
The Pemba white-eye derives its scientific name, Zosterops vaughani, from John Henry Vaughan, after whom it was named.

== Publications ==
- — (October 1929). "The Birds of Zanzibar and Pemba". Ibis. 71 (4): 577–608. doi:10.1111/j.1474-919X.1929.tb08776.x.
- — (1934). The Dual Jurisdiction in Zanzibar. South Africa: Government Printer. OCLC 504694709.
- — (1937–1939). Supplement [1935-1938] to The laws of Zanzibar. Zanzibar. OCLC 19433254.

Legal offices
Preceded by	Attorney-General of Zanzibar; 1930s	Succeeded by
Preceded by Edward Enoch Jenkins	Attorney-General of Fiji; 1945-1949	Succeeded by Brian Andre Doyle
