= Chief Magistrate of Fiji =

Judicial officer in the government of Fiji

The Chief Magistrate is a judicial officer in the government of Fiji, who presides over the Magistrates Courts.

The Chief Magistrate of Fiji has also assisted the court system of the isolated nation of Tuvalu with its legal matters.

The following persons have held office as Chief Magistrate (this is an incomplete list):

- Howard Morrison
- Apaitia Seru
- Sekove Naqiolevu (1992–1997)
- Sailesi Temo
- Naomi Matanitobua
- Usaia Ratuvili
