= Enoch Jenkins (lawyer) =

British lawyer and judge

The Honourable Sir Enoch Jenkins

16th Attorney General of Fiji
- In office 1938–1945
- Monarch: George VI
- Governor: Sir Harry Luke; Sir Philip Mitchell; Sir John Rankine(Acting); Sir John Nicoll(Acting); Sir John Rankine(Acting); Alexander Grantham
- Preceded by: Ransley Thacker
- Succeeded by: John Henry Vaughan

Solicitor General of Northern Rhodesia
- In office 1936–c1938
- Monarchs: Edward VIII; George VI
- Governor: Sir Hubert Young
- Preceded by: Ransley Thacker
- Succeeded by: John Henry Vaughan

Chief Justice of Nyasaland
- In office 8 November 1944 – c. 1950
- Monarch: George VI
- Governor: Edmund Richards; Geoffrey Colby

Justice of Appeal, Eastern Africa
- In office c. 1950 – c. 1955
- Monarchs: George VI; Elizabeth II
- Governor: Sir Evelyn Baring

Personal details
- Born: 8 February 1895 Cardiff, Wales
- Died: 1960 (aged 64–65)
- Education: University College of South Wales and Monmouthshire; Peterhouse, Cambridge
- Profession: Lawyer, Judge

Military service
- Rank: Lieutenant
- Unit: Royal Field Artillery

Sir Edward Enoch Jenkins (8 February 1895 – 25 February 1960) was a British lawyer and judge. He served as Attorney General of Fiji from 1938 to 1945. He subsequently served as Chief Justice of Nyasaland.

== Early life ==
Jenkins was born in Cardiff, Wales, on 8 February 1895 to William Jenkins and Briar Dene. He was known by his middle name. Educated initially at Howard Gardens Municipal Secondary School in Cardiff, he later studied at University College of South Wales and Monmouthshire, also in Cardiff.

Jenkins served as a lieutenant with the Royal Field Artillery during and after the First World War (1914-1920, and again in 1925).

He was admitted to Cambridge University on 16 May 1919, taking up residence in Peterhouse on 8 October and beginning his matriculation on 21 October that year. He graduated with B.A. and LL.B degrees in 1922. He subsequently earned a postgraduate M.A. degree in 1928.

== Legal career ==
Jenkins was called to the bar at Gray's Inn on 14 May 1924. He entered the colonial service in Nyasaland in 1925, before becoming Solicitor General of Northern Rhodesia in 1936. He then served as Attorney General of Fiji from 1938 to 1945; towards the end of his term, he was appointed Chief Justice of Nyasaland on 8 November 1944. As Chief Justice, he headed a commission of inquiry into a riot that had taken place at Zomba Prison in November 1949. He was criticised by both Sir Geoffrey Colby, the Governor of Nyasaland, and the Legislative Council, for allegedly paying undue attention to "matters of relatively minor significance" and of ignoring what they believed was the fundamental cause of the problem: the breakdown of discipline in the prison over the previous two years.

Sometime before September 1953, he was appointed a Justice of Appeal on the Kenya-based Court of Appeal for Eastern Africa. He sat as one of the judges on Jomo Kenyatta's unsuccessful appeal against his conviction for organizing the Mau Mau movement. He was still reported as serving on the Court of Appeal as of 24 December 1954.

Government offices
Preceded by	Solicitor General of Northern Rhodesia; 1936-c.1938	Succeeded by
Preceded by Ransley Thacker	Attorney-General of Fiji; 1938-1945	Succeeded by John Henry Vaughan
Preceded by	Chief Justice of Nyasaland; 1944-c.1950	Succeeded by
Preceded by	Justice of Appeal, Eastern Africa c.1950-c.1955	Succeeded by
