= Osea Gavidi =

Fijian politician (1943–2015)

Ratu Osea Gavidi (October 1943 – 3 April 2015, in Suva) was a Fijian politician and indigenous chief. He was prominently involved in defending the interests of the indigenous people in the western part of Fiji, seeking to establish their political autonomy, then (at the end of his life) their independence.

He was elected to Parliament as MP for Nadroga-Navosa Province, in the western part of the island of Viti Levu, in the two general elections of 1977, representing the Alliance Party. In 1981 however, he launched the Western United Front (WUF), a political party claiming that the interests of the indigenous inhabitants of the western part of Viti Levu had been neglected by the Alliance Party government. For the 1982 general election, the WUF formed an electoral coalition with the predominantly Indo-Fijian National Federation Party, but fared poorly; Gavidi himself was defeated by the Alliance Party candidate in his own constituency, and the Alliance remained in power. It had been a purely tactical arrangement to try to defeat the alliance; the WUF and the NFP had very different, often antagonistic political views. Following the election, the WUF appeared, in the words of historian Brij V. Lal, as "somewhat of a spent force".

The 1992 general election was held in the aftermath of the racist, anti-Indian military coups of 1987, and the adoption of a Constitution favouring indigenous control over politics. Gavidi stood for Parliament as a candidate for the Fijian Nationalist United Front Party, an indigenous nationalist party. He was returned to his previous seat as MP for Nadroga-Navosa.

In May 1993, together with far-right ethnic nationalist Sakeasi Butadroka, he launched the "Viti Levu Council of Chiefs", "in opposition to the Great Council of Chiefs, dominated by the chiefs from the eastern provinces". The movement, largely ignored, soon faded and disappeared.

During the coup d'état in 2000, orchestrated by indigenous nationalist George Speight, Gavidi led a delegation to negotiate with Speight for the establishing of political autonomy for the western provinces, and threatened secession if it were not granted. Speight's civilian coup was eventually countered by the military, democratic rule was restored, and Gavidi's move for western autonomy came to nothing.

In 2014, he led a movement for the secession of the Nadroga-Navosa Province from the rest of Fiji. On 10 October, the movement declared the foundation of the "Nadroga-Navosa Sovereign Christian State", with its own flag, and a Cabinet sworn in on 4 November. Its capital was declared to be the village of Cuvu, and Gavidi was proclaimed as its President. The secessionists explained their actions by their rejection of Fiji's new Constitution in 2013 which enshrined the principle of a secular state. The proclamation of secession was, however, rejected and condemned by the province's chiefly families. The members of the secessionist "government" were eventually arrested in August 2015 and charged with sedition and causing unrest. By that time, Gavidi had died in hospital, in April at the age of 71, and been buried in Cuvu.
