= Western United Front =

Western United Front (WUF) was an ethnically Fijian political party formed prior to the 1982 elections and contested the election in coalition with the National Federation Party (NFP-WUF Coalition). The party was in response to the disenfranchisement of indigenous peoples in the Western Provinces of Viti Levu as despite the presence of major economic drivers of the country located in their areas they lack representation on the decision making table of the country.

The perception of eastern itaukei hegemony on the political landscape of the country has created resentment in the Western areas of Viti Levu.

These Party was formed by one of the Nadroga minor chiefs Gavidi who campaigned on the platform that Western Itaukei should take their rightful place on making decisions and being represented in the Parliament of Fiji.

== The formation of the Party ==
Its support was concentrated in the Western Division, mainly in the provinces of Nadroga and Ba. Its formation was due to disenchantment of western Fijians about not receiving fair return from the Native Land Trust Board (NLTB) from the income derived from their land. Fiji's foreign exchange earnings are mainly generated from sugar, tourism, pine and gold, produced in the western division. It was claimed that western landowners, despite providing 65% of the money that financed the NLTB, received only 9%. The Party was launched on 17 July 1981 with the following goals:

- Protect and encourage the unity of western Fijians
- Protect the interests of landowners and to defend their rights to develop their resources according to their aspirations.
- Seek changes in the Ministry of Fijian Affairs and Rural Development to improve the lives of western Fijians.
- Improve educational facilities of western Fijians and provide them opportunities in commercial and industrial enterprises.

== Coalition with NFP ==
As the WUF had a narrow base and a regional focus it formed a coalition with NFP on 11 January 1982, because it regarded the NFP as "the most prominent political party opposed to the Alliance". Each party was to maintain its independent identity and objectives. Jai Ram Reddy, the leader of the NFP regarded the coalition as a partnership of equals.

== Leadership of WUF ==
The leader of the party was Osea Gavidi, a Nadroga chief, who had had a long-standing dispute with NLTB regarding pine plantations in Nadroga. He had contested the parliamentary election of March 1977 and September 1977 as an independent candidate, narrowly winning the Nadroga Fijian Communal Constituency. A prominent member was Napolioni Dawai, a Nadi chief, who had been an assistant Minister in the Alliance Government, but had lost pre-selection for his seat. He had been involved in disputes with tourist resort operators in Nadi regarding appropriate compensation for the use of his tribal land. Another prominent member was Isikeli Nadalo, who had formed the Nadroga Fijian Cane Growers Association and later the Fijian National Party to contest the 1963 election. He had then merged his party with Apisai Tora's Western Democratic Party to form the National Democratic Party, which in turn had merged with the Federation party to form the National Federation Party (NFP). Isikeli Nadalo was elected to the House of Representatives in 1972 under the NFP ticket but left the party following its split in 1977.

== 1982 Election ==
In the 1982 election, the WUF contested all the Fijian Communal Seats in the Western Division plus some others in adjoining provinces. Osea Gavidi narrowly lost the Nadroga Fijian seat, with 47.9% of the votes. Isikeli Nadalo won the National seat based in the Nadroga Province, while Napolioni Dawai lost his Ba-Nadi Fijian Communal seat obtaining only 22.8% of the votes. All other WUF candidates did poorly, getting less than 10% of the votes. Although WUF delivered 7% of the ethnic Fijian vote to the NFP-WUF coalition it was not enough to win enough seats to form Government. The coalition ended with the election and the leader of NFP blamed the failure of WUF to win enough Fijian votes for the coalition's loss.

== 1987 Election ==
On 6 June 1986, the first meeting regarding a coalition with the Fiji Labour Party (FLP) took place with Western United Front delegates where MP, Isikeli Nadalo argued that, "there should only be two political groups fighting the election." With the common aim of defeating the Alliance, on 10 October 1986, agreement was reached for coalition with FLP. In November 1986, when only Osea Gavidi was endorsed as a candidate by the coalition, which now also included the National Federation Party (NFP), WUF withdrew from the coalition. WUF fought the 1987 election in partnership with an NFP splinter group led by Sharda Nand, a supporter of Sidiq Koya. In the elections, WUF lost ground to both the Alliance and the Labour Party, with Gavidi receiving 41.7 percent of the vote and Nadalo only 13 percent.
