= Yalalevu =

Settlement in the District of Ba in Fiji

- Village
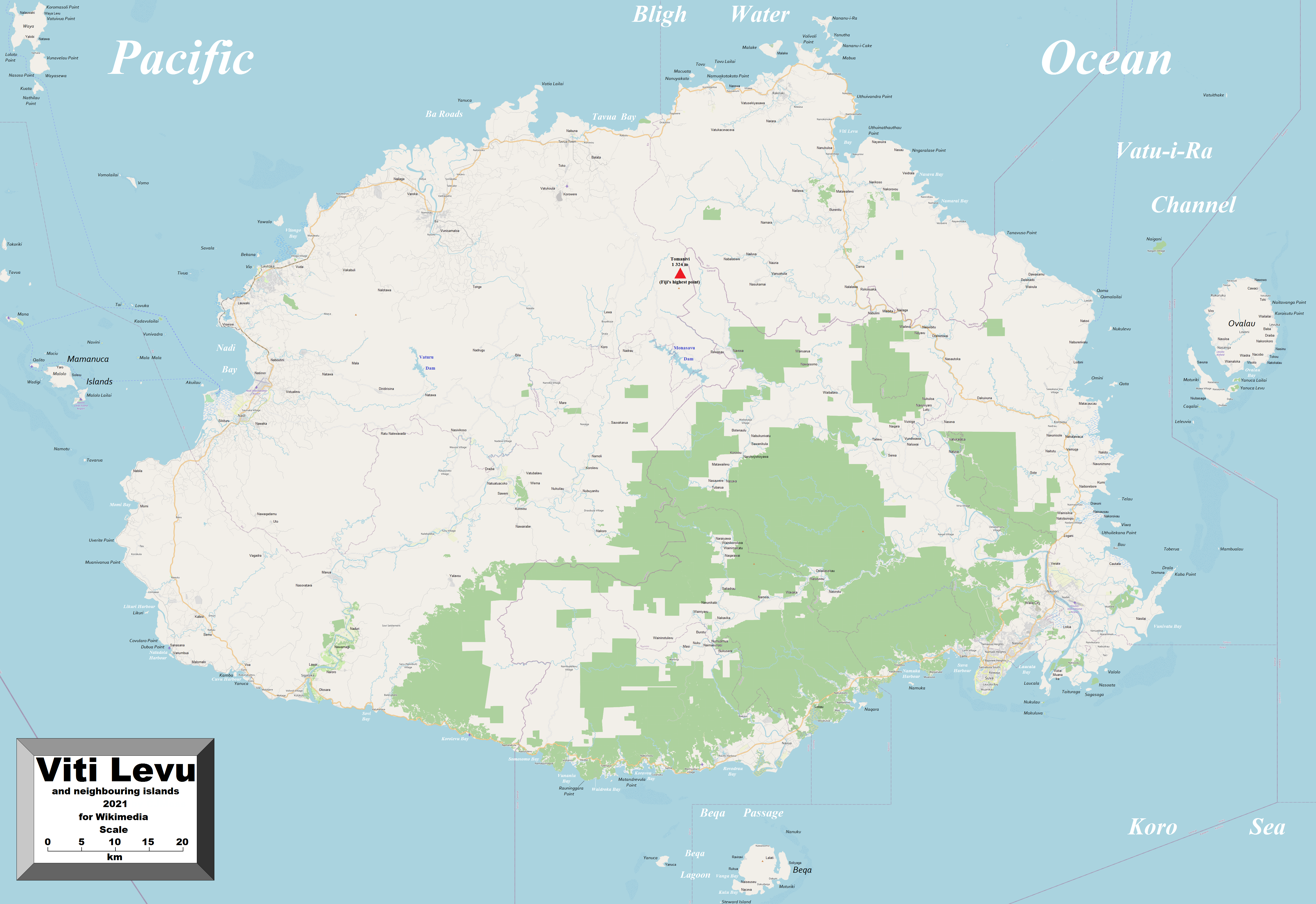
- Viti Levu

- Location in Fiji
- Country: Fiji
- Island: Viti Levu
- Division: Western Division
- Province: Ba
- Tikina: Ba
- Time zone: UTC+12

Yalalevu (Fijian pronunciation: [jalaleβu]) is a settlement in the District of Ba in Fiji, bounded by the Ba River on the east, Namosau River on the south and the settlement and village of Nailaga towards the north and west. Most of Yalalevu is within the Ba town boundary and this area is known as the Yalalevu Ward for Local Government administrative purposes. The terrain is mostly flat and not more than 5 metres above sea-level, consequently the area is prone to flooding. The soil is fertile and being of so low elevation and close to rivers, the area is safe from droughts. The land is mostly free-hold, a rarity in Fiji.

Yalalevu is mostly a residential area but there are sugar cane farms in the areas not within the town boundary, although some areas within the town boundary is also used for cane farming. There are a few light industries in the area as well. There are two schools, Arya Kanya Pathshala and Ba Muslim Primary School within the town boundary and Ba Muslim Secondary School outside the town boundary. The main highway, King's Road passes through the settlement.

A number of famous people were either born in Yalalevu or spent a significant part of their life in the settlement.

- Ramgarib Singh and Randhir Singh, responsible for the formation of the short-lived but first cane growers union in Fiji in 1919, Indian Cane Growers Association, owned land in Yalalevu which they used for cane farming.
- The brothers Parmanand Singh and Chattur Singh also lived in Yalalevu and used it as a base to further their political aspirations.
- Ayodhya Prasad tried to make his fortune in cane farming in Yalalevu, but soon learnt of the realities of sugar cane farming in Fiji in the 1930s. This led to his forming the Kisan Sangh.
- Vijay R. Singh was born and grew up in Yalalevu, and attended Arya Kanya Pathshala where his teacher was Ami Chandra, who made valuable contribution to education, sports and politics in Fiji.
- NFP Youth, and later Labour, Parliamentarian Davendra Singh was born and bred in Yalalevu and so was USP academic Anirudh Singh.
- Sidiq Koya's family also acquired free-hold land in Yalalevu and moved closer to town from rural Ba.
