= Constituency Boundaries Commission (Fiji) =

Fiji's Constituency Boundaries Commission was a civil service body charged under the 1997 Constitution of Fiji with determining the boundaries of electoral constituencies for the House of Representatives.

The Commission was established by Sections 75 through 77 of the Constitution. It had three members. One was chosen by the Prime Minister and one by the Leader of the Opposition. The third member was the Chairperson, chosen by the President, after consulting with both the Prime Minister and the Leader of the Opposition.

The chairperson must possess the qualifications required of a member of the Judiciary. Barred from membership were persons who are or have been in the preceding four years members of either house of Parliament or of a municipal council, or employed as civil servants. This was to safeguard the political impartiality of the commission.

The last commission was appointed in March 2005 for a term of twelve months. Its membership was as follows:

- Barrie Sweetman (chairman)
- Ratu Epeli Kanaimawi
- Rajeshwar Singh

Malakai Nagia served as secretary to the commission.

The commission recommended changes to its functions. The Fiji Live news service reported on 28 February 2006 that it proposed sitting in the year following a parliamentary election. It also called for changes allowing for it to be appointed three years before a subsequent election, and for its work to be completed a year before an election.

The commission became redundant with the 2013 Constitution, which established a single multi-member constituency for all 50 Members of Parliament.
