= Kelemedi Bulewa =

Fijian lawyer and politician (1951–2004)

The Honourable Kelemedi Bulewa

30th Attorney General of Fiji
- In office 1992–1996
- President: Ratu Sir Penaia Ganilau; Ratu Sir Kamisese Mara
- Prime Minister: Sitiveni Rabuka
- Preceded by: Apaitia Seru
- Succeeded by: Etuate Tavai

Member of Parliament for Serua/Rewa West Urban Fijian
- In office 1992–1999

Personal details
- Born: May 16, 1951
- Died: 2004 (age 52-53)
- Citizenship: Fijian
- Party: Soqosoqo ni Vakavulewa ni Taukei

Kelemedi Rakuve Bulewa [ke le me ndi mbu le wa] (May 16, 1951 – 2004) was a Fijian lawyer and former politician, who served as Attorney General of Fiji from 1992 to 1996.

Bulewa was known for his strongly pro-ethnic Fijian views and was often associated with the nationalist Taukei movement that was supportive of the 1987 coups.

Bulewa was elected to the House of Representatives in the 1992 election, the first post-coup election, and was appointed Attorney General later that year upon the resignation of Apaitia Seru.

Bulewa disagreed with, and attempted to change, laws dating from colonial times, that repressed the practice of the pre-Christian Fijian religion, saying that while he was not advocating it, he believed that freedom to practice it should be allowed for. Although most Fijians were now Christians, he said, many had only reluctantly abandoned worship of their ancestral gods.

Bulewa was supportive of calls for the dependency of Rotuma to be given self-government.

Legal offices
Preceded by Apaitia Seru	Attorney General of Fiji; 1992—1996	Succeeded by Etuate Tavai
Political offices
Preceded by	Member of the House of Representatives; 1992—1999	Succeeded by
