= Gordon Bryce =

Former Chief Justice of the Bahamas

Sir William Gordon Bryce CBE (1913–2004) was Chief Justice of the Bahamas from 1 June 1970 to 30 June 1973.

He was the son of James Chisholm Bryce and his wife Emily Susan Lees, and was educated at Bromsgrove School and Hertford College, Oxford. He was called to the bar at the Middle Temple. He served in the British Army from 1940 to 1946, reaching the rank of Major. He joined the Colonial Service, with first post in Fiji, 1949.
