= Director of Public Prosecutions (Fiji) =

- Coat of Arms of the Republic of Fiji

The Office of the Director of Public Prosecutions (ODPP) Fiji is an independent office under section 117 of the 2013 Constitution of Fiji. The ODPP is motivated by the principle that it is in the interest of justice that the guilty be brought to justice and the innocent are not wrongly convicted.

The Constitution of the Republic of Fiji authorises the Director of Public Prosecutions (DPP) to govern all matters concerning public prosecutions independently and ensures its independence not only for prosecution matters but also authorises the DPP alone, to determine all matters pertaining to the employment of all staff and administrative matters concerning the ODPP.

== History ==
The ODPP was first established under the Fiji Independence Order 1970 and has continued under the 1990, 1997 and 2013 constitutions. Mr Ghananand Mishra, appointed in 1970, was Fiji's first Director of Public Prosecutions. (See 3.1 for List of DPPs).

== Functions ==
The Director of Public Prosecutions is granted discretionary powers under the Constitution to conduct, take over, and discontinue criminal prosecutions in the courts of Fiji, except for proceedings undertaken by the Fiji Independent Commission Against Corruption. The 2013 Constitution under section 117 authorises the DPP to govern all matters concerning public prosecutions independently and ensures its independence not only for prosecution but also to determine all matters pertaining to the employment of all staff and prosecutors. The ODPP plays a key role in supporting the enforcement of criminal laws in Fiji, international laws, treaties and conventions that the Fijian Government has ratified, and contributing towards the continued development and maintenance of a just and fair criminal justice system.

The 2013 Constitution, for the first time, provides the DPP complete control over a parliamentary-approved budget, administrative staff and the appointment of legal staff.

== Director of Public Prosecutions Fiji ==
The DPP governs all matters concerning public prosecutions independently and ensures its independence not only for prosecution matters but also authorises the Director, alone, to determine all matters pertaining to the employment of all staff and administrative matters concerning the ODPP.

The president appoints the DPP on the recommendation of the Judicial Services Commission. Section 117 of the 2013 Constitution states that the DPP is appointed for a term of 7 years and is eligible for reappointment. The DPP must also be qualified to be appointed as a judge. The Constitution also empowers the DPP to appoint any legal practitioner, whether from Fiji or another country, as a public prosecutor in any criminal proceeding.

Section 51(2) of the Criminal Procedure Act, 2009, also empowers the DPP to appoint police officers as police prosecutors to conduct prosecutions in the Magistrates’ Courts of Fiji.

The DPP also has the authority to appoint, remove and institute disciplinary action against all ODPP staff (including administrative staff).

The current DPP is Christopher Pryde, who was appointed in November 2011.

Prior to this, Christopher Pryde was Fiji's Solicitor General, a position he had held since 2007. He was also Fiji's Permanent Secretary for Justice and Anti-Corruption until his appointment as the country's DPP.

Mr. Pryde's contract was renewed as the DPP for another seven years in 2019.

=== List of DPPs ===
No.	Name	Year Appointed
1	Ghananand Mishar	1970
2	Andrew Indar Narayan Deoki	1972
3	Kulandra Ratnesser	1976
4	Sailosi Wai Kepa	1980
5	Michael D. Scott	1985
6	Mehboob Raza	1987
7	Isikeli U. Mataitoga	1988
8	Nazhat Shameem	1994
9	Josaia Naigulevu	1999
10	Ayesha Jinasena	2010
11	Christopher T. Pryde	2011–Present

=== Assistant DPPs ===
The Assistant DPPs advise the DPP and manage roles in governing the (legal) operational functions of the ODPP, on behalf of and at the instructions of the DPP.

The ADPPs assist the DPP in the smooth and efficient functioning of the ODPP by ensuring that all criminal cases are promptly prosecuted in accordance with the law and prosecution principles. In assisting the DPP in the efficient management of the ODPP and in enforcing the criminal laws in Fiji, they are expected to keep themselves up-to-date with local and global developments in criminal law and procedures.

Accordingly, they actively contribute to staff professional development by participating and conducting regular training for State Counsel and by establishing a mentoring role within the ODPP team. They also play a proactive role in raising public awareness of criminal legal issues, with special focus on changes in criminal law and procedures.

Currently, there are three Assistant DPP's in Fiji, Lee Burney, Dr Andrew Jack and Elizabeth Rice.

== See also ==
The ODPP Fiji launched its revamped website and Twitter handle in 2015.
