= Ahmed Ali (Fijian politician) =

Fijian academic and politician

Member of House of Representatives
- In office 1982–1987

Minister of Education
- In office 1982–1986

Member of Senate of Fiji
- In office 2001–2005

Minister for Information and Media Relations
- In office 1986–1987; 2004 – 2005

Personal details
- Born: 1937 Suva, Fiji
- Died: 8 June 2005 (aged 67–68) Sydney, Australia
- Party: Alliance Party
- Profession: Academic

Dr. Ahmed Ali (1938 – 8 June 2005) was a Fijian academic and politician who held Cabinet office several times from the late 1970s onwards. Unlike the majority of his fellow Indo-Fijians, he was aligned with the Alliance Party of Prime Minister Ratu Sir Kamisese Mara in the 1970s and 1980s, and with the Soqosoqo Duavata ni Lewenivanua Party of Laisenia Qarase in the early 2000s. He was one of only two Indo-Fijians to agree to serve in the interim government established in the wake of two military coups carried out to assert indigenous political supremacy in 1987.

== Early life ==
Ali was a descendant of Indian indentured labourers brought to Fiji between 1879 and 1916. He was born in Suva and was educated at Marist Brothers' Primary and Secondary Schools. He obtained his MA in history from the University of Auckland and PhD from Australian National University.

== Academic achievement ==
Prior to entering politics, Ali enjoyed a distinguished career as an academic. He was initially a high school teacher and later joined the University of the South Pacific as a lecturer in History and politics. He obtained a doctorate at the age of 37 years, then held senior positions at the university. He was Senior Lecturer and Reader in history and politics, and was the Head of the School of Social and Economic Development. He also was Dean of Academic Affairs, acting Deputy Vice-Chancellor as well as Director of the Institute of Social and Administrative Studies.

Ali published numerous papers and books on Fiji Indians and the indenture system that brought Indians to Fiji.

== Pre-coup political career ==
In 1982, Ali accepted the invitation of the leader of the Alliance Party, Ratu Sir Kamisese Mara, to enter politics contest the Lau/Cakaudrove/Rotuma national seat as Ratu Mara's running mate. He easily won the safest National seat for the Alliance and was appointed the Minister of Education. In his effort to upgrade facilities in ethnic Fijian schools, to staff them with better trained teachers and to provide better opportunities to Fijian students at University, he closed down the Nasinu Teachers College and turned it into a dormitory for University of the South Pacific's Foundation (mostly Fijian) students to provide them with more tutorial help and an environment more conducive to studying. Ali's policy of large-scale arbitrary transfer of teachers brought together the two teachers' unions for the first time to oppose Government policy. There was also a hunger strike by final year students from the University of the South Pacific after the government refused to guarantee them jobs as teachers. In 1986, he was appointed Minister for Information, responsible also for broadcasting and the negotiations of the introduction of television in Fiji.

== Post-coup political career ==
Ali was an early supporter of Sitiveni Rabuka's 1987 coup and served in his first administration as Minister for Information. He was Minister without Portfolio in the Interim Military Government from October to December, 1987. He then took on a career in the public service becoming Permanent Secretary for Youth, Employment Opportunities and Sports, Foreign Affairs and External Trade and Information and Communications. He also served in the diplomatic service as High Commissioner to Malaysia and earlier as Consul-General in Auckland.

Following the parliamentary election held in 2001 to restore democracy following the coup d'état the year before, Ali was appointed to the Senate by Prime Minister Qarase. (9 of the 32 Senators are appointed by the Prime Minister). Ali was subsequently chosen as Vice-President of the Senate, a position he held until 20 December 2004, when he was appointed Minister for Information and Media Relations in the Qarase cabinet. He was to hold this portfolio till his death.

Following a short illness, Ali died at the Prince of Wales Private Hospital in Sydney, Australia, on 8 June 2005. His funeral was held the next day at Sydney's Lakemba Mosque. The Fijian government was represented at the funeral by George Konrote, Fiji's High Commissioner to Australia, and by Ratu Meli Malani, Fiji's Consul to Sydney. Time constraints made it impossible for any Cabinet colleagues of Ali's to attend the funeral, which had to be held the day after his death in accordance with Muslim protocol.

Ali was survived by his wife, Bessie, and their two sons, Usman and Hashim. Supporters and opponents alike praised Ali for his love and loyalty to Fiji, and for his willingness to serve his country in a multitude of capacities.
