= Fiji's Daily Post =

Fiji's Daily Post - logo

The Fiji's Daily Post (FDP) was a newspaper in Fiji that was founded in October 1987 by Wame Waqanisanini, Jr, who owned 50 percent of the shares. Taniela Bolea was the original publisher. The majority shares were later owned by the Fijian government. The newspaper suspended publication and has remain closed since 2010.

The FDP suffered criticism from its commencement in 1989 to its closure in 2010 that it represented an extreme ethnic Fijian/Itaukei viewpoint in Fiji's national discourse. The evidence for this conclusion is inconclusive. No other newspaper in Fiji has attempted to reach as wide a multicultural cross-section of the people as the FDP through the provision of five separate language publications. The staff of the newspaper was always multi-ethnic in complexion, representative of a wide range of religious and political viewpoints, and of both genders. As far as ideological orientation of the editorial staff is concerned, it is fair to suppose that once the Fiji government took an official role as major share-holder in the newspaper (late 1990s), the FDP was obliged to toe the government line, but again, this is an oversimplification of the facts. Content analysis of the FDP in comparison with Fiji's other major dailies, the Fiji Times and Fiji Sun does not bear this out.

== History ==
The first Daily Post (Volume 1, No. 1) appeared as a 24-page tabloid with a red masthead, Saturday, 23 September 1989. The cover story, headlined ‘Fiji Now Drugs Transit Point’, was by Karalaini Naciqa. That first edition contained court reports, special reports, an editorial, a feature on the Consumer Council, a children’s page, a page of international news, and a back page devoted to sport.

The second edition of the FDP appeared Monday (25 September 1989, Volume 1, No.2) and carried the newspaper’s first ‘Letters to the Editor’. The newspaper listed Kameli Rakoko as sports editor and Robert Wendt (now deceased) was named as chief sub-editor. In its first year, the newspaper served as an incubator for new journalists as well as a refuge for disaffected others. Stories and articles appeared by Mark Langan (former managing editor of the Samoa Daily News), Percy Kean, Filimoni Verebalavu, Kini Nalatu, Hari Gounder, and Kamal Iyer.

In 1990 the FDP management was listed as publisher, Taniela Bolea; editor, Isimeli Koroi; Western manager, Hari Gaunder; accountant, Ashok Kumar; advertising manager, Simione Celua; circulation manager, John Singh; and production manager, Mohammad Ali.

Four years into its operation, the FDP was, at the end of 1993, publishing editions of 40 to 68 pages varying according to daily demand and advertising. The publisher was still Taniela Bolea, but the editor was Nemani Delaibatiki (replacing Isimeli Koroi). Ravin Lal had taken over as advertising manager (from Simione Celua), the production manager was Aisea Itautoka (replacing Mohammed Ali), and circulation was in the hands of Vishwa Nand (in place of John Singh).

By 1994, distribution was under Timoci Rabo; systems manager was John Mansell; and the Suva office under Elenoa Lagataki. `Sidetracks’ with the late (and great) Robert Keith-Reid was a popular column at that time. Cartoons were occasional with ‘Mafi’s World’ the feature.

By 1997 Laisa Taga was managing editor (replacing Floyd Takeuchi and Nemani Delaibatiki), Greg Pooran had become acting advertising manager and a new position of marketing manager was held by Andrew Joseph. Another new position of financial controller was held by Anura Bandara.

In 1999, James Ah Koy, finance minister at the time, persuaded the Soqosoqo ni Vakavulewa ni Taukei (SVT) government to purchase a majority holding in the newspaper to assist government in public dissemination and explanation of its legislation and policies.

Despite government support, by 2000, the FDP was losing ground to the newly founded Fiji Sun. A new management group was thereby brought in to run the ailing newspaper. In 2005 the measures undertaken by that management group became the subject of Court action and criminal investigation brought on by the FDP's new Australian owner-publisher, Alan Hickling. Hickling had successfully bought a portion of both government and small share-holders' shares to acquire the newspaper.

The government retained its reduced percentage of the FDP shares, while Alan Hickling increased his percentage shares giving him the controlling interest.

During its time, the FDP was located at several addresses. It began as an office in Three Miles, Nabua (corner of Fletcher Road and Ratu Mara Road), before moving to Valelevu, Nasinu. The administration, editorial and advertising departments then split off and moved to Toorak (Toorak Road), Suva, leaving the press and production at Valelevu. The admin-ed-adv departments then moved downtown to Greig Street, Suva, before moving finally to Ackland Street, Vatuwaqa.

The FDP has also been responsible for publishing several ethnic newspapers each with its own editorial staff under the supervision and control of the English-language newspaper. The ethnic Fijian (now known as 'itaukei') language newspaper called Volasiga began under Samisoni Bolatacigi almost simultaneously with the inception of the FDP. In the mid-1990s, an ethnic Rotuman-language newspaper, No'ia Rotuma, commenced under the editorial direction of Aisea Eiali. At this time, an ethnic Indian Hindi-language newspaper Ramnik Joyati also commenced under the FDP flagship. In the early 2000s, two ethnic Chinese-language newspapers were also published by the FDP. These were the Chinese Mail and the Chinese Post - each taking a different perspective of China's role in the world.

== 2006 coup d'état ==
On Saturday, 2 December 2006 the FDP published what was alleged to be the military's timetable for taking control of the Qarase-led SDL government. The newspaper also reported that day that the incumbent Prime Minister, Laisenia Qarase, would be removed from power on 4 December (2006). Both reports were wrong, but warnings and intimidation from unknown persons led to concerns about the safety of staff and the FDP premises were evacuated at 3.30 pm, on 4 December and remained closed for a period of 24 hours. A further threat prevented the FDP from publishing on 5 December 2006, but it was the only newspaper to publish on the day after the coup (6 December).

On 8 December 2006, FDP general manager, Mesake Koroi, was detained and questioned by soldiers at Suva's Queen Elizabeth Barracks. Two days later, Koroi left for his village of Mavana on the Lau island of Vanua Balavu where he remained for three months. The newspaper continued to publish under editor-in-chief, Dr Robert Wolfgramm, news editor, Mithleshni Gurdayal, and Legal Officer, Api Mataitoga.

On 14 December 2006, Wolfgramm and Mataitoga were also taken to the military camp and detained for questioning, whereupon Wolfgramm had his passport confiscated and was informed of his deportation to Australia. Wolfgramm's deportation was not followed through and his passport was returned to him through the Office of the Fiji Human Rights Commission on 5 January 2007. The FDP had been refusing to accept military interference in its publications in the wake of the military coup which deposed the Qarase-led SDL government on 5 December 2006. In the two years leading up to the coup, numerous editorials were critical of the military leadership's position on the twice-elected government of deposed Prime Minister, Laisenia Qarase.

On 17 October 2008, the FDP published a letter-to-the-editor that was deemed to be in contempt of court by the attorney-general. The letter was similar to that which was later published in the Fiji Times and for which the publishers and editors of both newspapers were charged and legal proceedings begun.

Following the imposition of Fiji Public Emergency Regulations on 10 April 2009, censors were allocated to the newsrooms of all of Fiji's media including the FDP. Protests by various media against this measure initially took the forms of either black ink, blank spaces, or blurb. Eventually, the FDP negotiated a working relationship with this difficulty.

In February 2010, suffering the combined effects of falling staff morale, shrinking circulation, censorship demands, and weighty unresolved court cases, the FDP suspended publication and closed.

== See also ==
- Culture of Fiji
