= Manikam Pillai =

The Honourable Manikam Vasigam Pillai M.B.E.

24th Attorney General of Fiji
- In office 1981–1984
- Monarch: Elizabeth II
- Governor General: Ratu Sir George Cakobau
- Prime Minister: Ratu Sir Kamisese Mara
- Preceded by: Andrew Deoki
- Succeeded by: Qoriniasi Bale

2nd Chairman, Fiji Law Reform Commission
- In office 1984–1987
- Monarch: Elizabeth II
- Governor General: Ratu Sir George Cakobau
- Prime Minister: Ratu Sir Kamisese Mara
- Preceded by: K. A. Stuart
- Succeeded by: Vacant; Next held by Daniel Fatiaki; 1994-1995

Senator of Fiji
- In office 1981–1984
- Appointed by: Prime Minister of Fiji
- President of the Senate: Robert Munro; Wesley M. Barrett

Personal details
- Citizenship: Fijian
- Party: Alliance Party
- Occupation: Lawyer, Sports administrator

Manikam Vasagam Pillai MBE (last name sometimes spelt Pillay) was a Fiji Indian lawyer, football administrator, and politician. He was a supporter of the Alliance Party and in the 1968 by-elections contested the Nadi Indian Communal seat against Dr A. D. Patel, the leader of the Federation Party, but lost by 7903 votes to 2772. He later served as Attorney General of Fiji from 1981 to 1984. He then became Chairman of the Fiji Law Reform Commission, serving till 1987.

== Career ==
Pillay was President of the Fiji Football Association from 1962 to 1965, and again from 1967 to 1983. He opened Govind Park in July 1976. Associates remembered him as a polite and unflappable person, who rarely spoke during negotiations, except to propose a compromise (which was usually accepted) to break a deadlock.

In hte 1980 Birthday Honours, Pillai was made a Member of the Order of the British Empire (MBE) for his services to the community. He died in the late 1980s or early 1990s.

Legal offices
Preceded by Andrew Deoki	Attorney General of Fiji; 1981–1984	Succeeded by Qoriniasi Bale
Preceded by K. A. Stuart	Chairman, Fiji Law Reform Commission; 1984–1987	Succeeded by (Vacant)
Political offices
Preceded by	Senator of Fiji; 1981–1984	Succeeded by
