= Semesa Sikivou =

Fijian academic, politician and diplomat

Semesa Koroikilai Sikivou, CBE (1917 – 1990) was a Fijian academic, politician, and diplomat.

== Education and career ==
Sikivou graduated from New Zealand's University of Auckland, and went on to become the first Fijian to acquire a post graduate degree from the London School of Economics.

He taught at Suva Methodist Primary School in the 1930s and among his students was the future ombudsman of Fiji, Sir Moti Tikaram.

== Lelean Memorial School ==
Towards the end of 1942, at the height of the Pacific Campaign of the Second World War, the Colonial Authority was issued a command to close all urban schools and surrender their compounds to the military, to be used as military camps for the war campaign against the Japanese threat. At that time, a notable missionary teacher by the name of Mr. William Ewart Donnelly, was serving as principal of Toorak Boys’ School. Whilst other overseas teachers immediately left Fiji to await the end of the war, the determined missionary principal, Mr. Donnelly sent a circular to all members of the senior classes of Classes Six, Seven, and Eight of Toorak Boys School, inviting volunteers to come away with him, to continue their education. After consultation with the heads of the Methodist Church, he was given permission to use the principal’s residence at the Davuilevu Technical School. As a result, he and 50 volunteers from Toorak Boys School in Suva, met at the principal’s residence on 3 March 1943. Their first classrooms were the two master bedrooms in the house and the long verandah on the eastern side as their library. There were only two classes and two teachers; the late Mssrs. W.E. Donnelly and Semesa Sikivou.

In the 1943 Methodist Church Annual Conference, Mr. Donnelly was given permission to expand his classes along the same ridge and as a result, the boys themselves, with his and Semesa Sikivou's guidance, built three large bures, where the teachers staff quarters presently stand. He was also directed to name the new school, Lelean Memorial School, in memory of a long serving and beloved missionary in Fiji, the Reverend Charles Oswald Lelean. Rev Lelean was an Australian missionary who served in Fiji for 36 years.

Amongst his students were Rusiate Nayacakalou, who later became the first South Pacific Islander to graduate with a PhD and Jimione Samisoni who became the first Fijian to become the dean of the Fiji School of Medicine.

== Political career ==
Sikivou served as a member of the Legislative Council in the 1960s, and in January 1963 he was one of eight to sign the Wakaya Letter, which affirmed the principles of Fijian paramountcy. When Fiji gained its independence from the United Kingdom in 1970, he was appointed Fiji's first Ambassador to the United Nations, serving until 1976. He reentered politics in the 1980s, and served as Minister for Foreign Affairs.

In the 1972 New Year Honours List he was appointed a CBE.

Sikivou was offered a knighthood by Queen Elizabeth II, but declined it, saying that it was his honour to serve her without remuneration.

== Personal life ==
Sikivou, who hailed from Rewa Province, belonged to the tribe of the Roko Tui Dreketi's Guardians of the Spirit and the Wise Counsel, and as such was a member of the traditional court of the Paramount Chief of the Burebasaga Confederacy. He had strong ties to the Provinces of Namosi, Naitasiri, and Verata.

He was married twice, first to Seini Ratuvou of the Vutia District of Rewa, with whom he had one daughter, Ateca (who died of asthma at the age of one) and three sons: Navitalai, Rokocanini, and Metuisela Sikivou. His second marriage was to Salote Tabuanitoga of Kadavu Island. With her he had two sons: Jese and Mosese, and a daughter, Vasiti Sikivou-Waqa.
