= Attorney-General of Fiji =

Political and legal officer in Fiji

- Loya Raraba kei Viti (Fijian) फिजी के महान्यायवादी (Fiji Hindi)
- Coat of arms of the Republic of Fiji
- Incumbent; Vacant since 1 June 2025
- Style: The Honourable
- Reports to: Prime Minister of Fiji
- Appointer: President of Fiji
- Formation: 1872
- First holder: Robert Wilson Hamilton

The Attorney-General is a political and legal officer in Fiji. The attorney-general is the chief law officer of the State, and has responsibility for supervising Fijian law and advising the government on legal matters. Like other members of the Fijian Cabinet, the attorney-general is appointed by the president on the advice of the prime minister.

According to the 2013 Constitution of Fiji, the attorney-general is required to be a registered legal practitioner in Fiji, with not less than fifteen years' post-admission legal practice, either in Fiji or internationally. The attorney-general is a member of the Cabinet of Fiji, and is normally expected to be a Member of Parliament. The Prime Minister may, however, choose an attorney-general from outside Parliament after determining there is no suitably qualified Member of Parliament who supports the Government. An Attorney-General who is not a Member of Parliament may sit in Parliament, but may not vote.

The office of the attorney-general is the oldest surviving executive office in Fiji, having been established in the Kingdom of Fiji in 1872. It continued throughout Fiji's years as a British crown colony (1874–1970) and subsequently as the Dominion of Fiji (1970–1987) and republic (1987–present), with minimal modifications.

The attorney-general was the only Cabinet office, apart from that of the prime minister, specifically established by the 1997 Constitution, which required the attorney-general to be a member of either the House of Representatives or the Senate. A unique feature of the office was that except for voting rights (which could be exercised only in the chamber of which the attorney-general was officially a member), the attorney-general had the authority to participate in the business of both chambers of Parliament. This feature became redundant upon the adoption of the 2013 Constitution, which established a unicameral parliament.

== Role of the Attorney-General's Office ==
The role of the attorney-general is defined as "providing essential legal expertise and support to the Government". More specific functions include "legislative drafting", "legal aid", "the prerogative of mercy" (advising the President), "liquor licensing" and "film censorship". Thus, the attorney-general is responsible for all legal needs of government departments, statutory bodies, and state-owned enterprises.

The office has three offices in Suva, Lautoka, and Labasa respectively. Government legal work in the country's Central and Eastern Divisions is undertaken by the central office in Suva, headed by the Solicitor-General, while the Lautoka office (headed by the Principal Legal Officer) is responsible for the Western Division. The Northern Division is covered by the Labasa office.

== List of attorneys-general of Fiji ==
Note that some attorneys-general have held office in multiple consecutive administrations, particularly in the colonial era.

=== Kingdom of Viti (1871–1874) ===
No.	Name	Term of office	Appointed by (King):
1	Robert Wilson Hamilton	1872	Seru Epenisa Cakobau
2	Charles Rossiter Forwood	1872–1873	Seru Epenisa Cakobau
3	Sydney Charles Burt	1873–1874	Seru Epenisa Cakobau

=== Crown colony (1874–1970) ===
No.	Name	Term of office	Governor
4	James Herman De Ricci	1875–1876	Sir Arthur Hamilton Gordon
5	Joseph Hector Garrick	1876–1882	Sir Arthur Hamilton Gordon
6	Fielding Clarke	1882–1886	Sir William Des Vœux
7	Henry Spencer Berkeley	1886–1889	Sir William Des Vœux
8	John Symonds Udal	1889–1899	Sir John Bates Thurston
9	Henry Edward Pollock	1901–1903	William Lamond Allardyce
10	Albert Ehrhardt	1903–1914	Sir Henry Moore Jackson
11	Alfred Karney Young	1914–1922	Sir Ernest Bickham Sweet-Escott
12	Kenneth James Muir MacKenzie	1922–1927	Sir Cecil Hunter Rodwell
13	Percy Alexander McElwaine	1927–1931	Sir Eyre Hutson
14	Charles Gough Howell	1931–1933	Sir Arthur George Murchison Fletcher
15	Ransley Samuel Thacker	1933–1938	Sir Arthur George Murchison Fletcher
16	Edward Enoch Jenkins	1938–1945	Sir Arthur Frederick Richards
17	John Henry Vaughan	1945–1949	Sir Alexander Grantham
18	Brian Andre Doyle	1949–1956	Sir Brian Freeston
19	Ashley Martin Greenwood	1956–1963	Sir Ronald Herbert Garvey
20	Henry Roger Justin Lewis	1963–1970	Sir Kenneth Phipson Maddocks

=== Dominion (1970–1987) ===
No.	Name	Term of office	Served under: [1]	
No.	Name	Term of office	Governor-General	Prime Minister
21	John Neil Falvey	1970–1977	Ratu Sir George Cakobau	Ratu Sir Kamisese Mara
22	Sir Vijay R. Singh	1977–1979	Ratu Sir George Cakobau	Ratu Sir Kamisese Mara
23	Andrew Indar Narayan Deoki	1979–1981	Ratu Sir George Cakobau	Ratu Sir Kamisese Mara
24	Manikam Pillai	1981–1984	Ratu Sir George Cakobau	Ratu Sir Kamisese Mara
24	Manikam Pillai	1981–1984	Ratu Sir Penaia Ganilau	Ratu Sir Kamisese Mara
25	Qoriniasi Babitu Bale	1984–1987	Ratu Sir Penaia Ganilau	Ratu Sir Kamisese Mara
26	Jai Ram Reddy	1987	Ratu Sir Penaia Ganilau	Timoci Bavadra
27	Alipate Qetaki	1987	Ratu Sir Penaia Ganilau	vacant
[1] The Attorney-General in this period was formally appointed by the Governor-General, but on the advice of the Prime Minister.

=== Republic (1987–present) ===
No.	Name	Term of office	Served under: [1]	
No.	Name	Term of office	President	Prime Minister
28	Sailosi Kepa	1987–1992	Ratu Sir Penaia Ganilau	Ratu Sir Kamisese Mara
29	Apaitia Seru	1992	Ratu Sir Penaia Ganilau	Major general (Rtd) Sitiveni Rabuka
30	Kelemedi Bulewa	1992–1996	Ratu Sir Penaia Ganilau	Major general (Rtd) Sitiveni Rabuka
30	Kelemedi Bulewa	1992–1996	Ratu Sir Kamisese Mara	Major general (Rtd) Sitiveni Rabuka
31	Etuate Tavai	1996–1999	Ratu Sir Kamisese Mara	Major general (Rtd) Sitiveni Rabuka
32	Anand K. Singh	1999–2000	Ratu Sir Kamisese Mara	Mahendra Chaudhry
32	Anand K. Singh	1999–2000	Ratu Sir Kamisese Mara	Ratu Tevita Momoedonu
(27)	Alipate Qetaki	2000–2001	Ratu Josefa Iloilo	Laisenia Qarase
(27)	Alipate Qetaki	2000–2001	Ratu Josefa Iloilo	Ratu Tevita Momoedonu
(27)	Alipate Qetaki	2000–2001	Ratu Josefa Iloilo	Laisenia Qarase
(25)	Qoriniasi Babitu Bale	2001–2006	Ratu Josefa Iloilo	Laisenia Qarase
33	Aiyaz Sayed-Khaiyum	2007–2014	Ratu Josefa Iloilo	Rear admiral (Rtd) Frank Bainimarama
33	Aiyaz Sayed-Khaiyum	2007–2014	Ratu Epeli Nailatikau	Rear admiral (Rtd) Frank Bainimarama
34	Faiyaz Koya	2014	Ratu Epeli Nailatikau	Rear admiral (Rtd) Frank Bainimarama
(33)	Aiyaz Sayed-Khaiyum	2014–2022	Ratu Epeli Nailatikau	Rear admiral (Rtd) Frank Bainimarama
(33)	Aiyaz Sayed-Khaiyum	2014–2022	Jioji Konrote	Rear admiral (Rtd) Frank Bainimarama
(33)	Aiyaz Sayed-Khaiyum	2014–2022	Wiliame Katonivere	Rear admiral (Rtd) Frank Bainimarama
35	Siromi Turaga	2022–2024	Wiliame Katonivere	Major general (Rtd) Sitiveni Rabuka
36	Graham Leung	2024 –2025	Wiliame Katonivere	Major general (Rtd) Sitiveni Rabuka
(35)	Siromi Turaga	2025 –	Naiqama Lalabalavu	Major general (Rtd) Sitiveni Rabuka
[1] The Attorney-General in this period is formally appointed by the President, but on the advice of the Prime Minister.

== See also ==
- Cabinet of Fiji
