= Isabel Kerr =

Scottish medical missionary who worked in India

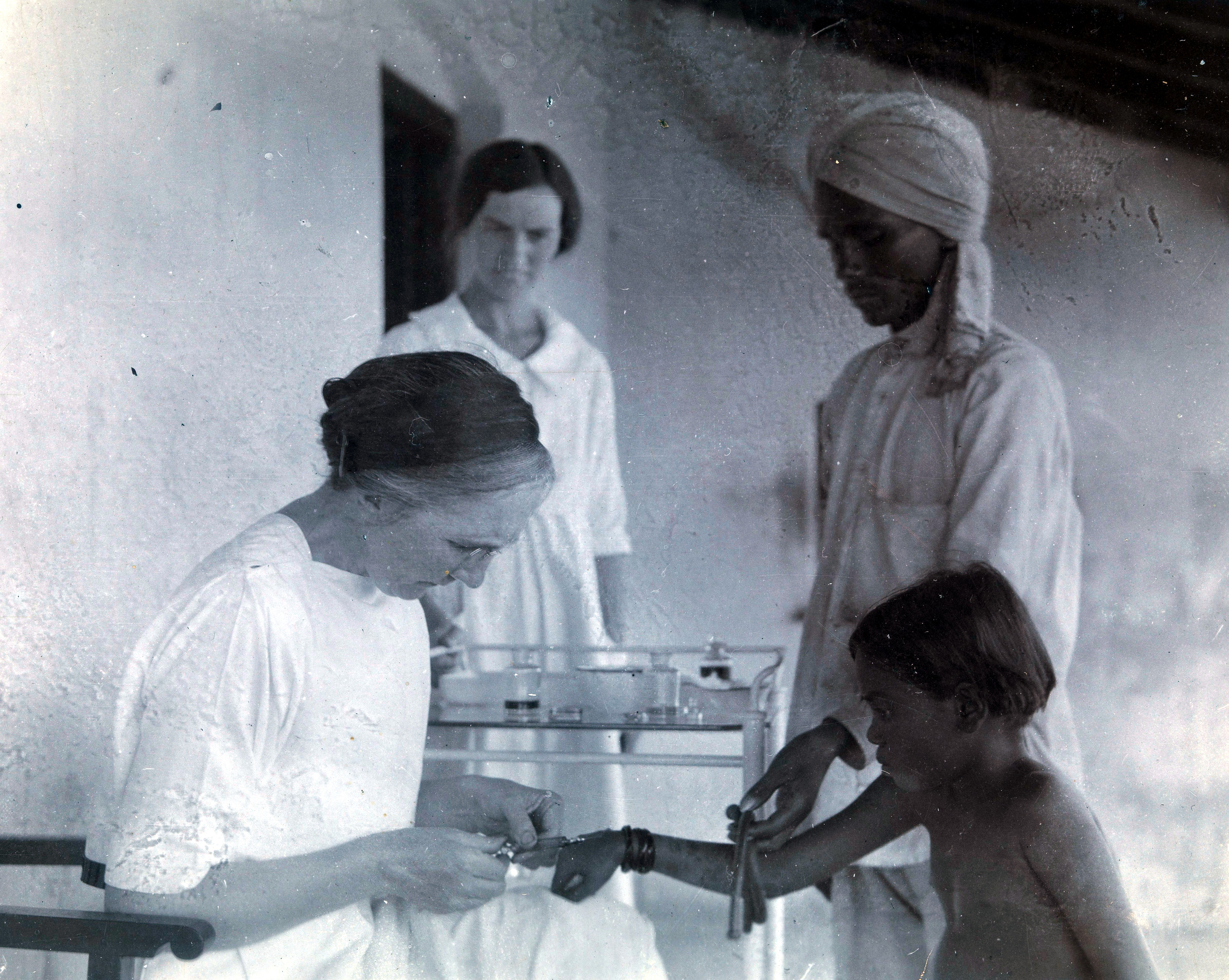
- Isabel Kerr vaccinating a child
- Born: Isabella Gunn; 30 May 1875; Enzie, Aberdeenshire, Scotland
- Died: 12 January 1932 (aged 56); India
- Education: University of Aberdeen
- Occupation: physician
- Known for: medical missionary treatment of leprosy recipient of Kaisar-i-Hind_Medal
- Relatives: George Kerr (m. 1903)
- Medical career
- Sub-specialties: leprosy

Isabella Kerr (née Gunn; 30 May 1875 – 12 January 1932) was a Scottish medical missionary who worked in India in the early 20th-century. She created the Victoria Leprosy Centre in Hyderabad. She worked to cure leprosy in India.

== Early life and education ==
Isabella Kerr was born in Gollachy, Enzie in Banffshire (now Moray), Scotland on 30 May 1875. Her parents were Mary Garden and John Bain Gunn, a farmer. Kerr studied medicine at the University of Aberdeen receiving her MB ChB in 1903.

== Career ==
Kerr met and married the Reverend George McGlashan Kerr, a former joiner, who had returned from being a missionary in Southern Rhodesia. They married in 1903, and worked together in England until the Wesleyan Methodist Missionary Society sent the Kerrs to Hyderabad in India in 1907.

At their mission, Kerr and her husband worked on unrelated tasks, but they both realised that the treatment of patients with leprosy was inadequate. In 1911, Kerr opened a leprosy centre at the mission in Nizamabad, Telangana, but in time, it attracted more patients than it could accommodate. With financial assistance from Raja Narsa Goud (Narsagoud), a Hindu philanthropist, who helped them receive a donation from the Nizam of Hyderabad, Mir Osman Ali Khan, the last local ruler, to help build the Victoria Treatment Hospital on land the ruler donated at Dichpally, and in 1915, this larger and more permanent facility opened. By the early 1920s, the hospital had grown to more than 120 buildings.

Kerr worked with Ernest Muir who had piloted the use of hydnocarpus oil (chaulmoogra tree) to treat leprosy, based on earlier research by Leonard Rogers, who began the British Empire Leprosy Relief Association. The Kerrs' centre at Dichpally was seen as leading the campaign against leprosy, and Kerr's writing helped make this the standard treatment throughout India. Kerr and her husband were awarded Kaisar-i-Hind Medals in 1923.

== Death and legacy ==
Kerr died suddenly in 1932. In her obituary it was said that 'Her medical skill and her devotion to the cause of the leper, together with her modest reserve and womanly charm, won her innumerable friends both in India and at home.' Her husband remained in India until 1938 when he retired to Scotland. In the 1960s, the leprosy centre that she founded had over 400 patients. The papers of Kerr and her husband are held in University of Edinburgh.

== Awards and honours ==
- Kaisar-i-Hind Medal, 1923
