= Ernest Muir (doctor) =

Scottish medical missionary (1880–1974)

Ernest Muir FRCS, CIE, CMG (17 June 1880 – 1 November 1974) was a Scottish medical missionary and educator in British-controlled India and Nigeria most noted for his work with Hansen's disease (leprosy).

== Life ==
Ernest Muir was born in Banffshire, Scotland on 17 June 1880. He studied at Watson's College and the University Medical School in Edinburgh. In 1903, he began work as a medical missionary for the Edinburgh Medical Missionary Association in Tiberias. Tiberias was then part of the Ottoman Acre Sanjak, and later part of Israel.

Muir returned to Scotland to complete the clinical aspects of his medical doctorate and then left for Bengal in British-controlled India in 1908, where he worked on tropical diseases, completing his degree with a thesis on visceral leishmaniasis ("kala-azar") in 1910. He completed the requirements for joining the Fellowship of the Royal Colleges of Surgeons while on leave in Scotland in 1914.

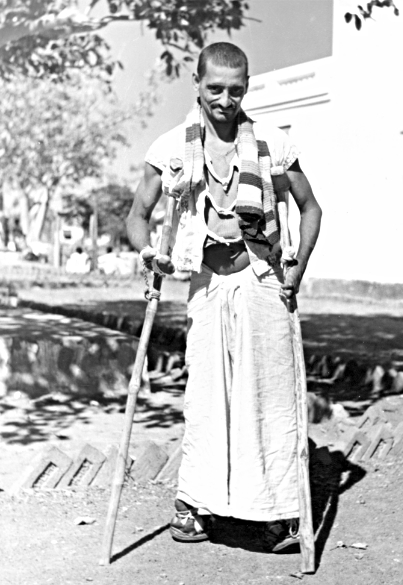
Man with Hansen's disease (leprosy), India

In 1920, Leonard Rogers invited him to come to Calcutta (now Kolkata) to study Hansen's disease at its School of Tropical Medicine, beginning with an annual grant of Rs 20,000. Muir advocated for the use of the traditional Ayurvedic treatment of hydnocarpus oil from the chaulmoogra tree and counterirritants to treat Hansen's disease. He wrote numerous papers and books on its prevalence, study, and treatment. He worked closely with Isabel Kerr, who set up "the outstanding centre in South India for the treatment of leprosy" at Dichpali. He trained colonial doctors including Robert Greenhill Cochrane, who went to India in 1924.

Muir was closely involved with the British Empire Leprosy Relief Association (now LEPRA) after its founding in 1924, serving as its secretary. He began travelling to speak on Hansen's disease in 1925, visiting Hong Kong, Mainland China, Japan, Canada, and the United States.

Muir served as professor of tropical diseases at the Calcutta School of Tropical Medicine (CSTM) from 1933–1935. Muir finally left India in 1936 and the same year was sponsored by the Leonard Wood Memorial to tour the United States, speaking before the American Society of Tropical Medicine in Baltimore and visiting the Carville Leprosarium in Louisiana and the leprology researchers at George Washington, Harvard, Rochester, Vanderbilt, and Western Reserve universities. In 1938, he served as secretary at the congress of the International Leprosy Association in Cairo.

In 1939, he worked at the Uzuakoli college and leper colony in Nigeria in what is today Abia State. He also served for a time as superintendent of the Chacachacare Leprosarium on Trinidad in the Caribbean. In 1948 Muir served as secretary of the ILA congress in Havana.

Muir died on 1 November 1974 at his home in London.

== Awards and honors ==
Muir received an honorary LL.D. from Hong Kong University in 1925.

Muir received a Kaisar-i-Hind medal for Public Service in India as of 3 June 1921 and a bar to the medal at the 1932 Birthday Honors.

He was named a companion of the Order of the Indian Empire at the 1937 Coronation Honors.

Muir was named a companion of the Order of St Michael and St George at the 1948 New Year Honors.

== See also ==
- Isabel Kerr
