= Ram Narayan (disambiguation) =

Ram Narayan or Ramnarayan is an Indian male given name.

People with the name include:

- Ram Narayan (1927-2024), Indian sarangi musician
- Ram Narayan Bishnoi (1932–2012), Indian Rajasthani politician
- Ram Narayan Chakravarti (1916–2007), Indian phytochemist
- Ram Narayan Deoki (1905–1964), Fiji Indian minister of the Methodist Church of Fiji and Rotuma
- Ramnarayan Dudi (born 1948), Indian Rajya Sabha member for Rajasthan
- Ram Narayan Goswami (died 2010), Indian West Bengali politician and Rajya Sabha member
- Ramnarayan Rawat, Indian historian and professor at the University of Delaware
- Ram Narayan Sharma (1915–1985), Indian independence advocate and trade unionist
- Ram Narayan Singh (1885–1964), Indian independence leader and Lok Sabha member
