= Hindu Maha Sabha (Fiji) =

Hindu Maha Sabha was an organisation representing various Hindu organisations and was formed in Fiji in 1926, following the formation of All-India Hindu Maha Sabha in India. The formation of the organisation both in India and Fiji occurred after the assassination of Swami Shraddhanand, a Hindu activist in India. The formation of the Sabha in Fiji coincided with the formation of a national Muslim organisation, the Fiji Muslim League.

Although the organization was formed to bring together all the Hindu groups, its leadership soon came under the control of the better organised Arya Samajis. When Shri Krishna Sharma arrived in Fiji in 1927, he assumed leadership of the Sabha, and the Fiji Muslim League, in a complaint to the Government about the activities of Sharma, alleged that the Sabha was formed to commemorate the death of Shraddhanand. The Hindu Maha Sabha (and the Fiji Muslim League) contested with the Indian Reform League (mainly supported by Indian Christians) for the right to represent Indians.

The Sabha was organised at village level into sangathans (religious unions) and was led in the Suva-Nausori area by Vishnu Deo, K. B. Singh, Kundan Singh Kush and the western districts of Viti Levu by Chattur Singh and Sahodar Singh. There was social and economic boycott of the Muslims and the extreme elements within the organisation attempted to put pressure on the small Muslim community to undergo shuddhi (reconversion). Relationship between Hindus and Muslims reached a low point with assaults and complaints to the Government. One outcome of this conflict was the call by Muslims for separate representation in the Legislative Council.

Thakur Kundan Singh Kush, who arrived in Fiji in 1928, was the principal force behind the shuddhi and sangathan efforts. On 29 June 1930 at a meeting of the Hindu Maha Sabha in Nausori, Kush was elected president. Resolutions passed at the meeting asked Hindus to organize themselves and to adhere to the teachings of the Hindu Dharam regarding diet and to boycott a rival newspaper(Vriddhi). The sangathan movement was never fully supported by Fiji's Arya Samaj as a whole with Samajs from different parts of Fiji opposing it, but it received favourable coverage from the pro-Arya Samaj newspaper, Fiji Samachar, controlled by Vishnu Deo.

In 1930, an intelligence committee was set up by the Government to monitor the activities of the organisation. Letters were opened and searched, publications thought to be seditious were destroyed and instructions in Indian schools were monitored. At a meeting of the Sabha, in Suva, a resolution was passed expressing sorrow at the execution of Indian freedom fighters Bhagat Singh and Sukhdeo on 23 March 1931. This further infuriated the local European community.

The decline of the Hindu Maha Sabha was due, not to outside influence, but came from internal division. While in the past the more numerous Sanatanis (orthodox Hindus) were content to let the Arya Samajis take leadership of the Hindus in Fiji in the past, the arrived from India, in December, 1930, of Sanatani preacher, Ram Chandra Sharma, led to open debate between the two Hindu groups about who represented true Hinduism. It ended with a court case and conviction of Vishnu Deo. An orthodox Hindu organisation was formed which aligned itself with the Muslims and Christians against the Arya Samaj. Sharma was joined by another Sanatani preacher, Murarilal Shastri, and the two criticised the Sabha for causing dissension.
