= Islam in Fiji =

Islam in Fiji (Fiji Hindi: فجی میں اسلام (Perso-Arabic script); फ़िजी में इस्लाम (Devanagari script)) is the third largest religion. There are about 60,000 Muslims in Fiji. Muslims in Fiji are mostly Sunni Muslim with a Shia and Ahmadiyya minority. In the 1966 Fiji elections, a Suva-based Muslim communal party, the Muslim Political Front, took part. Presently, Urdu and an Urduized/Arabized/Persianized form of Fiji Hindi is widely taught among Muslim schools for the Fijian Muslims all across Fiji.

In the early 19th century, Muslims migrated to Fiji from South Asia. The Fiji Muslim League (FML) was formed in 1926. The FML was vital in the growth of Islam as they contributed to the schooling system of Fiji with launching Muslims schools in the country. In 1929, Fiji Muslim League sought to acquire discrete representation for Muslims in the Fiji Legislative Council.

Some modern Muslim migrants from Arab Countries such as Sudan, Yemen and Egypt also have settled in Fiji forming a Fijian-Arab Population, with other migrants from other country's around the Islamic World. Islamic holy days such as Mawlid are also given as a holiday by the Fijian government.

== History ==
=== Early history ===
By the early 19th century, Muslim migrants preserved Islam within their families for generations after the first ship brought various ethnicities across South Asia, indentured labourers to Fiji in 1879. The first Indentured laborer ship, the Leonidas, had quite a high proportion 22% of Muslims. Between 1879 and 1916, a total of 60,553 laborers were brought to Fiji from South Asia under the Indentured labourer system. Muslims played their part in protest against indenture. In 1907, a group of indentured laborer went on strike in Labasa. Most of these were Pashtuns and Punjabis who were Muslims. Although Muslims lived as a separate community, they had peaceful relations with other communities including the native Fijians and the Indian Hindus.

From 1884 onwards, as laborers completed their five-year tenure, Muslim communities started to form in many areas of Fiji. The arrival of Mulla Mirza Khan, a free-immigrant, was a boost to Islam in Fiji, as he contributed a lot to the educational and religious needs of the Muslims. In 1900, mosques were built in Nausori and in Navua, and another mosque was built in Labasa in 1902. Many mosques began to be built and Islam started rising in Fiji. In 1909, Muslims made submissions to the Education Commission for Urdu to be taught in the Persian script to their children. In 1915, an Islamic organization, the Anjuman Hidayat ul-Islam made a petition to the Fijian government for the solemnization of Muslim marriages by a qazi and recommended its secretary's appointment for the Suva area.

=== Establishment of Fiji Muslim League ===
After Muslims of Fiji being indentured, the Fiji Muslim League was formed at the Jamia Masjid in Toorak on October 31, 1926. The Fiji Muslim League has contributed in the education in Fiji. Their first school, the Suva Muslim Primary School, was launched in the founding year 1926. Today, the Fiji Muslim League owns and operates 17 primary and 5 secondary schools, plus a tertiary institution known as the Islamic Institute of the South Pacific. The Fiji Muslim League accepts students and staff members of all ethnic and religious groups, not just Muslims.

The Fiji Muslim League provides help for tertiary studies for needy Muslims through loans from its Education Trust and the Islamic Development Bank. Of the two IDB loan/awards for tertiary studies, one is granted locally for information technology and the other for the study of medicine in Pakistan. Most of the latter in recent times have been allocated for training Muslim female doctors; some have qualified and are working in Fiji.

Besides education, the Fiji Muslim League from its outset has attempted to assist in satisfying all the social needs of the Muslim community. Its involvement in social welfare is both at national and branch levels. In times of natural disasters or turmoil, the Fiji Muslim League directly helps Muslims and non-Muslims alike whose homes and lives have been disrupted. Its charity work ensures many families are fed, clothed, housed, and children sent to school.

== Politics ==
Since 1929, the Fiji Muslim League has sought to obtain separate representation for Muslims in the Legislative Council, and in the House of Representatives and the Senate since 1970. Except for the period between 1932 and 1937, Muslims have been represented well in Fiji's Parliament. From 1937 to 1963, at least one Muslim was always nominated into the Legislative Council out of a total of five Indo-Fijian representatives. For the 1966 Fiji elections, the Muslim Political Front was formed to advance Muslim political rights. It later on joined the newly formed Alliance Party.

== Sports ==
In 1944, the first Muslim association football inter-district tournament was organized in Sigatoka by the Fiji Muslim Sports Association. It has since been an annual event and in 2006, three teams from overseas featured in the inaugural Fiji Muslim Football Association International Muslim Club Championship. The Fiji Muslim sports association in association with Fiji Muslim FANCA Sports Federation is hosting its inaugural club championship during Easter Weekend 2007 in Lautoka. 4 teams from Australia, 5 teams from New Zealand and 1 team from the US and an all-district team from Fiji will participate. This will be an annual event to get Muslim sports in Fiji amongst the best. Many Muslims also play for the Fiji national football team.

== Muslim youth ==
There is also a very active youth movement tracing its origins to the 1960s, whose executives meet regularly and organise camps and other gatherings for young Muslims. It has a national outreach, with members from high schools as well as tertiary institutions and university graduates, as well as professionals in the workforce. Recently it also organized a wing to facilitate the interests of young Muslim women.

== 2002 American Samoa restrictions ==
In 2002, Fiji was one of 25 nations whose citizens were restricted in entering American Samoa due to the latter's new policy of restricting the entry of Muslims to the territory. The Fijian government protested, and Fiji was removed from the restricted list in 2003.

== Famous Fijian Muslims ==
- Gaffar Ahmed, Fijian politician
- Rosy Akbar, Fijian politician, current Minister of Education
- Joy Ali (1978-2015), Fijian boxer
- Junior Farzan Ali, Fijian boxer, current WBF Asia Pacific lightweight champion (brother of late Joy Ali)
- Shamima Ali, Fijian political activist,
- Ahmed Bhamji, Fijian politician and businessman, former Minister for Communications, Transport and Works
- M. S. Buksh, Fijian politician, known to be the first Indo-Fijian to gained formal education
- Mirza Namrud Buksh (1925–2007), Fijian TV and radio personality, auctioneer and politician
- Farouk Janeman (1953-2013), Fijian former football player and coach
- Aiyaz Sayed-Khaiyum, Fijian politician
- Aiyub Ali Hussein, MP from Lautoka
- Aman Samut, businessman and mayor of Lautoka

== See also ==
- Fiji Muslim League
- Islam in Oceania
- Religion in Fiji
