= Jyoti Bhusan Chatterjea =

Indian hematologist

- Born: 16 February 1919; Kolkata, West Bengal, India
- Died: 29 February 1972 (aged 53); Kolkata, West Bengal, India
- Education: University of Calcutta
- Known for: Studies on Hemoglobin E/β-thalassaemia
- Awards: 1958 UoC Coates Medal; 1963 Asiatic Society Barclay Medal; 1964 ICMR Basanti Devi Amir Chand Prize; 1965 Minto Medal; 1966 Shanti Swarup Bhatnagar Prize; Spouse - Indira Chatterjee Daughter - Dr. Bharati Chatterjee Brother-in-law - ≤Shambhu Das Bhattacharjee≥
- Scientific career
- Fields: Pharmacology
- Workplaces: Calcutta School of Tropical Medicine

Jyoti Bhusan Chatterjea (16 February 1919 – 29 February 1972) was an Indian hematologist, medical academic and the director of Calcutta School of Tropical Medicine, He was known for his hematological and clinical studies of Hemoglobin E/β-thalassaemia and was an elected fellow of the National Academy of Medical Sciences, and the Indian National Science Academy. The Council of Scientific and Industrial Research, the apex agency of the Government of India for scientific research, awarded him the Shanti Swarup Bhatnagar Prize for Science and Technology, one of the highest Indian science awards for his contributions to Medical Sciences in 1966. (Note: Long link - please select award year to see details)

== Biography ==
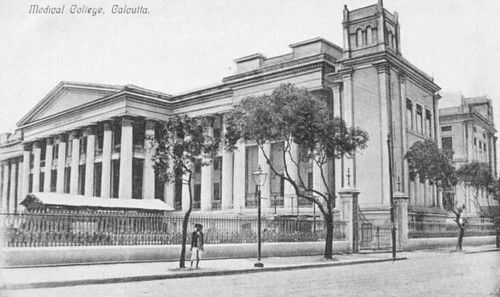
Calcutta Medical College in 1910

J. B. Chatterjea, born on 16 February 1919 in Kolkata, the capital city of the Indian state of West Bengal, graduated in medicine from Calcutta Medical College of the University of Calcutta in 1942 and secured the degree of Doctor of Medicine from the same institution in 1949. Starting his career as an assistant research officer at Calcutta School of Tropical Medicine and served as a professor of hematology from 1956 till he was appointed as the director of the institution in 1966. He was holding that position when he died on 29 February 1972, at the age of 53, survived by his wife and a daughter.

== Legacy ==
Chatterjea's researches were focused on the hematological aspects of tropical diseases and his studies on the human red blood cells widened the understanding of the etiopathogenetic aspects of hereditary disorders. His work covered the roles played by iron, folic acid, vitamin B12 and conjugate foliate compounds in human system and assisted him in the discovery of Hemoglobin E in Bengali people. His inquiries led to the clinical, hematological, biochemical, biophysical and the genetical studies of Hemoglobin E/β-thalassaemia prevalent in Bengal region. He documented his researches by way of several medical papers published in peer-reviewed journals (Note: Please see Selected bibliography section) and his work has been cited by a number of authors and researchers.

Chatterjea chaired the Medical and Veterinary Section of the 51st Indian Science Congress held at Kolkata in 1964 and was the Asian representative on the executive committee of the International Society of Blood Transfusion the same year. He served as the president of various medical organizations; at Indian Society of Hematology for two terms in 1963 and 1964, at Indian Anthropological Society during 1967–68, at Indian Public Health Association and at Indian Association of Pathologists and Microbiologists in 1968. He also served as a counselor to international organizations such as International Society of Hematology, International Society of Blood Transfusion and the Reticuloendothelial Society.

== Awards and honors ==
Chatterjea received the Coates Medal of the University of Calcutta in 1958 and the Barclay Medal of the Asiatic Society in 1963. In between, the Indian National Science Academy elected him as a fellow in 1960. The Indian Council of Medical Research honored him with the Basanti Devi Amir Chand Prize in 1964, the same year as he was elected as a fellow by the National Academy of Medical Sciences and he received the Minto Medal the next year. The Council of Scientific and Industrial Research awarded him Shanti Swarup Bhatnagar Prize, one of the highest Indian science awards in 1966. He was also a fellow of a number of international medical societies which included the American College of Physicians, Royal College of Pathologists, Swiss Society of Hematology, German Society of Hematology and Medical Oncology, Indian Society of Hematology and Blood Transfusion, Indian Association of Pathologists and Microbiologists, Indian Anthropological Society and Indian Public Health Association. J. B. Chatterjea Memorial Committee published a festschrift on him in 1975, titled Trends in Haematology which featured several articles including those of Chatterjea.

== Selected bibliography ==
- Chatterjea JB (1971). "Haemoglobin Lepore. An aberrant haemoglobin variant". J Indian Med Assoc. 56 (10): 319–20. PMID 5093793.
- Swarup-Mitra S, Ghosh SK, Chatterjea JB (1971). "Stability of erythrocytic adenosine triphosphate (ATP) and its relation to the activity of pyruvate kinase (PK) in Hb. E-thalassaemia disease". Indian J Med Res. 59 (9): 1430–4. PMID 5161569.
- Swarup-Mitra S, Datta MC, Ghosh SK, Chatterjea JB (1972). "Observations on erythrocytic glutathione (GSH) and related enzymes during in vitro storage of blood from haemolytic anaemia patients". Indian J Pathol Bacteriol. 15 (1): 27–33. PMID 4642970.
- Banerjee DK, Datta MC, Sarkar P, Chatterjea JB (1973). "Daily requirement of riboflavin in normal Indian subjects". Indian J Med Res. 61 (2): 199–207. PMID 4758996.
- Rakshit MM, Chatterjea JB, Mitra SS (1973). "Observations on the intraerythrocytic distribution of foetal haemoglobin in Hb. E-thalassaemia disease". Indian J Pathol Bacteriol. 16 (4): 41–5. PMID 4791521.
