= Islam in American Samoa =

American Samoa Amerika Sāmoa
- Unincorporated and unorganized U.S. territory
- Flag Seal

Religious population of American Samoa
Islam		1.3%
Christianity		96.9%
Protestant		41.7%
Catholic		27.3%
Pentecostal		5.3%
Other Christian		22.6%
Non-religious		0.9%

American Samoa map

American Samoa is an unincorporated territory of the United States, located South East of Samoa and consisting of seven main islands. American Samoa is a predominantly Christian nation, identifying as a region founded by God, however, has become more religiously diverse since the mid-20th century. The religion of Islam was first brought to American Samoa in the mid-1980s by Muslim expatriate workers from government programs. The region received their first native convert in 1985, although Muslim adherents still remain a minority in American Samoan society today. While the population is small, the spread of Islam has been a significant part of the Island’s history.

Claiming that as result of increased terrorist activities globally in the early 2000s, specifically the Bali bombing, the government imposed a strict ban on residents of 23 nations from entering their territory without explicit permission from the island’s attorney general’s office. Most of the countries banned were either located in the Middle East and identified as Muslim nations, or were home to a large number of Muslim adherents. The ban has received opposition from human rights groups along with those on the list as well as neighboring islands, mainly over issues of religious freedom.

The religion still influences life in American Samoa, with the establishment of public education and health groups as well as a range of community activities by native converts and Muslim organizations with the aim of teaching the natives about Islam.

== American Samoan religious background ==
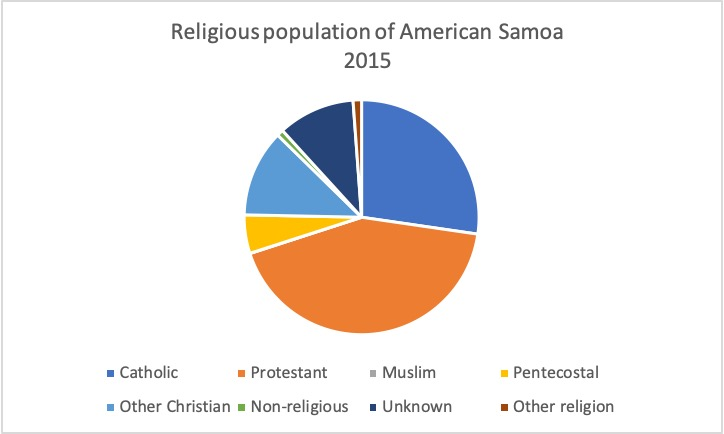
Religious population of American Samos 2015

=== Background as a Christian nation ===
A large majority of pacific islanders are Christians as the Christian belief was welcomed into the region in the mid 20th century and has been deeply entrenched in the Pacific since. The Assemblies of God, a Pentecostal community within the Protestant tradition, are an example of this early influence, having first arrived in American Samoa in 1926. The majority of Christians in American Samoa remain Protestants, encompassing 42.7% of the total population, however there is also large Catholic population with 22.6%. The spread of Christianity to the South Pacific brought about a number of social programs including the acquisition of literacy to many communities and has had a substantial intellectual impact on the South Pacific.

=== The spread of Islam ===
Although Islam arrived in the region more recently, it has similarly impacted the social and cultural lives of many people in the South Pacific. Dawah is an Arabic word traditionally meaning to invite individuals and communities to come "back to God", however in the 20th century it has become the foundation for a number of social, political and cultural activities worldwide. The growing globalisation of the world has also “facilitated interest in religious alternatives” such as Islam in many South Pacific nations including American Samoa.

Islamic missionary activity has been conducted in the South Pacific since the 1970s and has resulted in a “small but steady stream of local converts” due to the conditions of an increasingly globalised world. The first convert joined Islam in 1985 in neighboring Western Samoa, as a result of Muslim immigrants from abroad sharing their beliefs with the local people. It is believed that this religious influence spread to American Samoa as the territory recorded a dozen adherents a decade later in the 1990s.

In a number of the larger South Pacific states, Muslims are supported by regional bodies and organisations including the Fiji Muslim League and the Regional Islamic Dawah Council of Southeast Asia and the Pacific (RISEAP), which formed in 1980 and aimed to coordinate their Islamic missionary activities, “training individuals for Islamic social work” and establishing mosques and Islamic centres around the South Pacific. American Samoa is not presently a member of the RISEAP, however the organisation partners with neighbouring countries such as Fiji and Samoa. The first President of RISEAP, Tunku Abdul Rahman, stated their mission to encourage Muslims to continue their religious pursuits in the Pacific nations where they are minorities. The Pacific Island countries are traditionally “collectivity-oriented” and have similar customs and practices to some religious groupings. Muslims in the South Pacific have been involved in educating activities, engaging with the communities and instructing people in Islam. This influence has seen the creation of the Islamic Institute of the South Pacific in Fiji. Islam is also often associated with the establishment of social and public health organisations in the region.

== The Muslim population ==
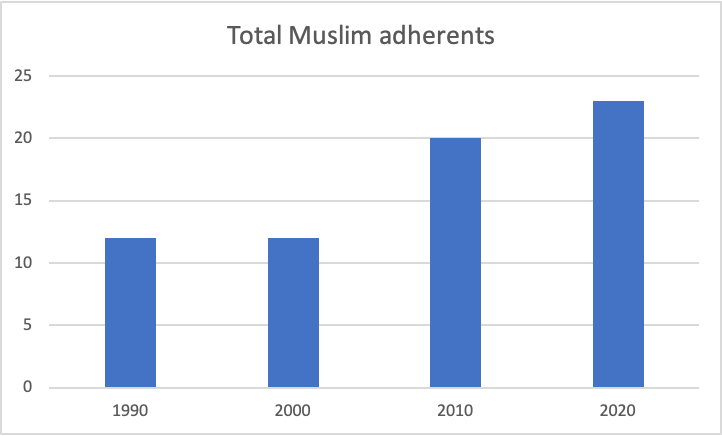
Total Muslim adherents in American Samoa 1990-2020

It is estimated that there are about half a million Muslims in Oceania, equating to about 1.4% of the total population of the continent. Within the Asia-Pacific Muslim population, it is estimated that about 12-15% of adherents are Shia, the majority instead adhering to the Sunni denomination of Islam. The islands are dominated by the Christian faith, with 98.3% of the population being Christian adherents. However, it is estimated that 0.03% of the American Samoan population are Muslim adherents, the population almost doubling between the years 1990 to 2020 from 12 to 23 adherents.

A study of where American Samoan residents were born showed that 6.3% of the population migrated from the United States, a nation with over 3.45 million Muslims in 2017. The religious diversity of this nation is an influencing factor on the American Samoan Muslim population.

== The 2002 ban ==
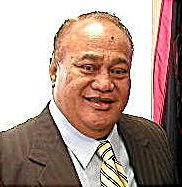
Tauese Fiti Sunia - 56th Governor of American Samoa (1997-2003)

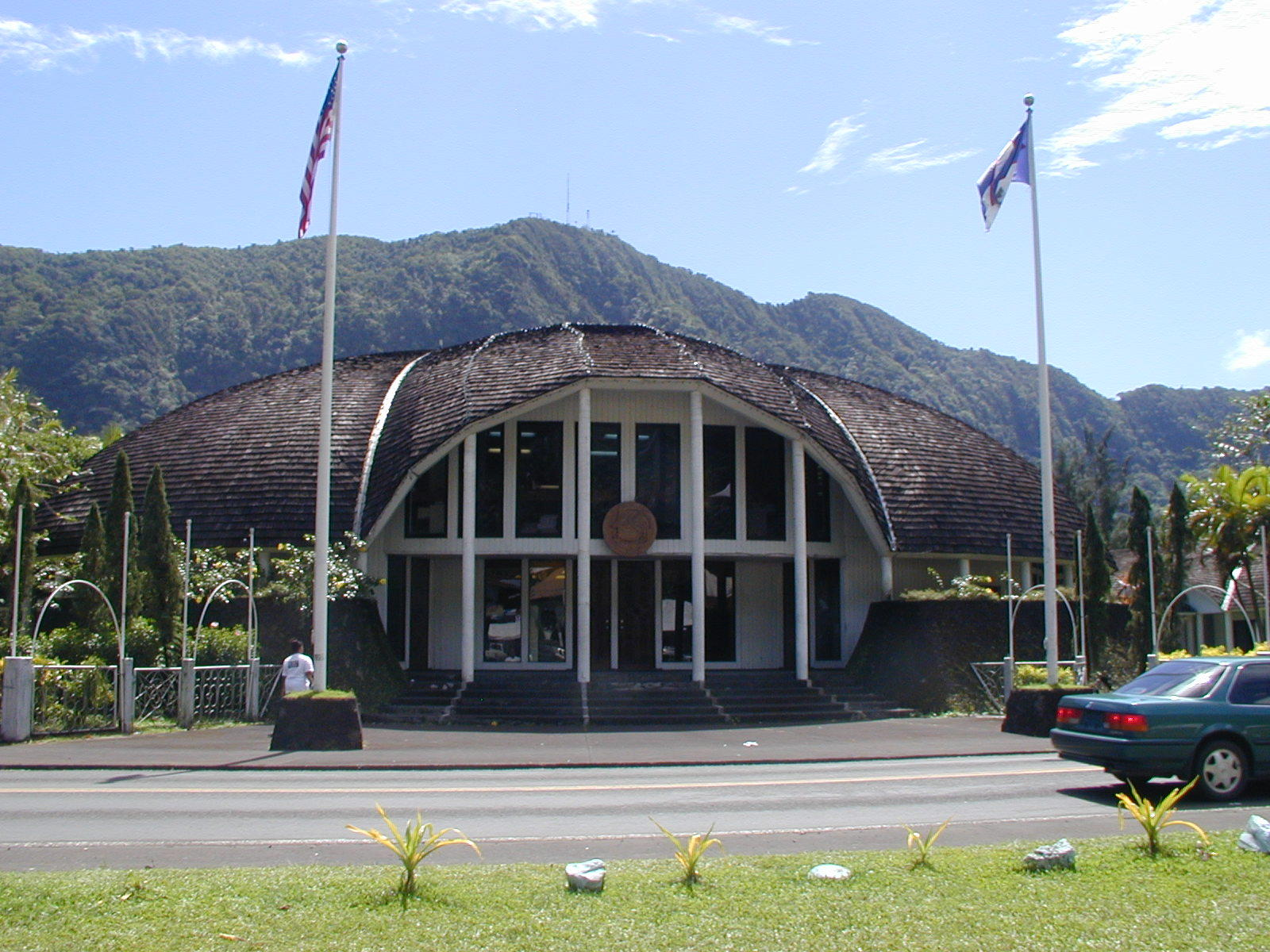
American Samoa Legislature Building

In December 2002, action was taken to ban nationals from 23 countries from entering American Samoa without explicit approval from Fiti Sunia, the territory’s attorney general’s office. Those banned from American Samoa were mainly Arab nations, including a number in the Middle East. As a part of this regulation, any visitor to the islands with a Middle Eastern appearance or Muslim sounding name received thorough examination before arrival and could be refused entry altogether.

This decision was enforced after Governor Tauese Sunia claimed that a credible security threat was made, speculating that American Samoa could be targeted for terrorist activities because of its status as a US territory. The action to ban these nations was put in place because officials claimed they did not have the supplies to manage and enforce “anything less sweeping and make it effective”.

It is widely believed that this sweeping action by American Samoan officials was prompted by the Bali bombing, an explosion which killed 202 people, organized and carried out by a terrorist organisation named Jemaah Islamiya and occurring two months prior to the decision in October 2002. According to members who coordinated the attack, Bali was chosen because it was often frequented by American citizens, thus it was believed that the American Samoan status as a US territory linked the nation to further retaliation from extremists. The widespread ban of several Muslim nations was therefore claimed to have been implemented for the safety of the citizens. However, the scale of the ban has led to some drawing comparisons to US President Donald Trump’s threat to impose bans on Muslims entering the United States at an election rally in December 2015.

Furthermore, members of the Islamic Human Rights Commission have claimed that the closing of the island’s American consulate was prompted by a terrorist alert, in which two “unidentified men of ‘middle eastern appearance’” were taking photos of the consulate, although these claims have not been officially confirmed.

=== The countries banned ===
- Afghanistan
- Algeria
- Bahrain
- Cuba
- Fiji (until 2003)
- Indonesia
- Iran
- Iraq
- Libya
- Morocco
- North Korea
- Oman
- Pakistan
- Philippines
- Qatar
- Saudi Arabia
- Somalia
- Sudan
- Syria
- Tunisia
- United Arab Emirates
- Yemen

The ban included the island of Fiji, the only other Pacific Island on the list. Their addition was linked to the nation's large Muslim population, with approximately 80,000 adherents on the island. The extension of the ban to other South Pacific nations was justified as some Fijian Muslim adherents have travelled to and studied at Islamic institutions in typically Muslim countries. However, after strong protest from Fijians as well as oppositional media coverage across the territory, the island was removed from the list in early 2003.

== Reaction to the 2002 ban ==
=== Support for the ban ===
In the early 2000s, there was a fear of a spread of radical Islam to American Samoa, and the potential for an outbreak of religious wars globally. The risk of terrorism has remained a concern of the South Pacific, the regional body, the Pacific Islands Forum, holding a conference to examine legislative reform, directly targeting terrorism in 2003. After the terrorist attacks in Bali, the Australian Strategic Policy Institute released a policy review identifying the increased threat of terrorism in South Pacific nations such as American Samoa. The review suggested a number of states were susceptible to terrorist activities and could be “potential havens for terrorist groups” and Islamic extremism, particularly due to their close proximity to Australia and connection as a territory of the United States. However, the threat level posed in the Pacific is still “recognised as low”.

Samoan Prime Minister Tuilaepa Malielegaoi advocated the duty of the government in legislating to avoid such religious tensions through means such as the ban instated by American Samoan officials. Furthermore, Mohammed Daniel Stanley, an American Samoan convert to Islam, came out in support of Sunia’s decision.

This ban was also supported by a number of neighbouring South Pacific actors including the secretary general of the Samoa Council of Churches, who called for the nation of Samoa to “bring in a blanket ban on Islam”. Samoan Reverend Motu similarly claimed that Islam posed a threat to the future of his country, pressing the Samoan government to entirely prohibit the religion on the island.

=== Opposition to the ban ===
The actions of American Samoa were officially condemned by the Islamic Human Rights Commission, claiming the ban violates international law and calling for the government to rescind the ban and issue a formal apology to individuals affected. No known action has been made toward rescinding the bans as of November 2020.

== Restrictions on religious freedom ==
Particularly after the 2002 ban of a number of Muslim nations from American Samoa, a number of sources started questioning issues to do with religious freedom. In the South Pacific countries, the average scores of laws and policies used to restrict religious freedom as well as government favouritism shown towards religious groups increased over 20% in the decade between 2007 and 2017. The region is relatively high in this category, measuring 5.0 compared with the global average of 4.7. It was also reported that 86% of countries in the Asia-Pacific region in 2017 reported events of “harassment or intimidation of religious groups by governments” and over half the countries in the region have experienced some type of “communal tension” between religious groupings.

Several Christian groups have also attempted to influence the government and the populace in general to support restricting the practice of Islam in the territory or even ban it outright.

== See also ==
- Islam in Oceania
- Islam in Fiji
- Religion in American Samoa
- Territories of the United States
- Islam in Samoa
- 2002 Bali bombings
