= Telangana University =

Public university in India

- Type: Public
- Established: 2006; 20 years ago
- Chancellor: Governor of Telangana
- Vice-Chancellor: T. Yadagiri Rao
- Location: Dichpally, Nizamabad, Telangana, India
- Campus: 600 acres (2.4 km^{2})
- Website: Official site

Telangana University is a public university located at Dichpally in Nizamabad, Telangana, India, established in 2006 .

The campus encompasses 600 acres (2.4 km^{2}) of land. The university consists of buildings they are administrative building, University College, University College of computer science and engineering, University College of Law, University College of Commerce and Management, University College of Science, Central library, Guest house, health centre, three hostels one for girls and other two for boys, VC Residency, University Canteen. Telangana University was established through Act Number 28 of 2006, state government, to cater to the academic pursuits of the backward and rural student community of Nizamabad and Adilabad districts.

It was established at Dichpally of Nizamabad district. The State Government handed over around 577 acres of land in Suddapally and Nadipally villages of Dichpally Mandal to the university.

Telangana University is recognised by the University Grants Commission under section 2(b) and 2(f) of the U.G.C.Act. The University is the 3rd largest government universities in the state of Telangana after Osmania and Kakatiya universities.

The university offers 18 courses with 1250 students pursuing their studies in courses at University Main Campus and the South-Campus of Bhiknoor, Nizamabad District both abutting the National Highway 44. Accommodation is provided separately for girls and boys with furnished hostels and playgrounds within.

Steps are being taken to develop playgrounds opposite the classroom complex and girls hostel. Massive planting is going on to make Telangana University into a green campus. The plantation works are done under the National Rural Employment Guarantee Scheme. The campus will soon have avenue of trees, nursery beds and landscape designing.

== Dichpally campus ==
- The campus of Telangana University is located abutting the National Highway 44 (formerly NH 7) at Dichpally, which is 13 km away from the Nizamabad city and the located on Hyderabad and Nagpur National Highway.
- Dichpally Station is the nearest railway station. Nizamabad has a train route in Secunderabad-Manmad section of the South Central Railway.
- There is a bus almost every 10 minutes from the TSRTC Jubilee Bus Station of Secunderabad to Nizamabad, which is located at around 140 km distance from Secunderabad.
- The campus is connected to the Hyderabad and Nagpur highway. The town of Armoor is just 22 kilometers from the campus and town of Kamaredy is 40 kilometers from the campus.
- The campus hosts professional courses like LL.B., LL.M., M.B.A and M.C.A.

== South Campus Bhiknoor ==
The postgraduate college, Bhiknoor, was started in 1976 under the Six Point Formula programme with the objective of establishing postgraduate centres in rural areas. It was established under Osmania University. PG College Bhiknoor commenced with M.Sc. (Chemistry) with specialization in Agrochemicals, Fertilizers, Pesticides as job-oriented courses with an intake of 12 students. Some students have gone on to pursue Ph.D programmes.

The South campus of Bhiknoor has about 50 acres. Bhiknoor PG Centre was taken over by Telangana University from Osmania University during 2010 and is renamed as Telangana University South-Campus, Bhiknoor. A few courses have been shifted from Main Campus to South-Campus, Bhiknoor. The campus offers four courses where 250 students are pursuing their studies. The South campus has recognition for M.Sc. Organic Chemistry course. A number of students of M.Sc. Organic Chemistry were selected for a CSIR Junior Research Fellowship.

== Academic programmes ==
During 2006 the university started with six programmes with an intake of 28 in each programme and added seven more programmes in 2007. Five more courses were launched in 2008 thus raising the total number of courses offered at Telangana University to 18 with an intake capacity to 28 in all the postgraduate programmes except MBA, MCA & LLB which has an intake of 30 each.

== Affiliated colleges ==
It has the jurisdiction over 2 districts-Adilabad and Nizamabad.

== See also ==
- List of universities in India
- Universities and colleges in India
- Education in India
