= MIAF =

MIAF may refer to:

- Melbourne International Arts Festival
- Melbourne International Animation Festival
- Maunatul Islam Association of Fiji
- Marshal of the Indian Air Force, the senior rank in the Indian Air Force
- Manchukuo Imperial Air Force
- Multi-Image Application Format
