= Raja Narsa Goud =

Indian philanthropist (1866–1948)

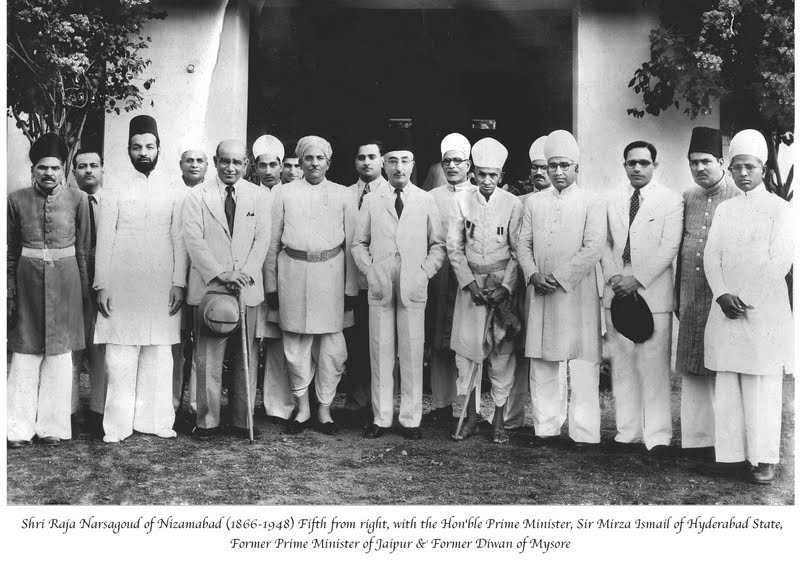
Raja Narsa Goud is fifth from the right.

Raja Narsa Goud (1866-1948) was a philanthropist known for his significant contributions to charities, especially those caring for people with leprosy.

== Biography ==
Raja Narsa Goud was born to a wealthy family in Nizamabad district in 1866. He was the youngest of three children. His elder brothers, Rama Goud and Lakshma Goud travelled and worked for the family excise business but Raja Narsa Goud mostly worked in Nizamabad. The three brothers became one of the richest families in Hyderabad State.

== Philanthropy ==
Goud made substantial contributions to charities, including those that supported other castes. He financed the construction of temples, mosques and dargahs, and facilities for the poor and for Brahmins in Kotagalli and Kanteshwar in Nizamabad.

Goud paid for the construction of the first water tank in Nizamabad and for further plumbing works with Cheelam Janakibai, head of Sirnapalli.

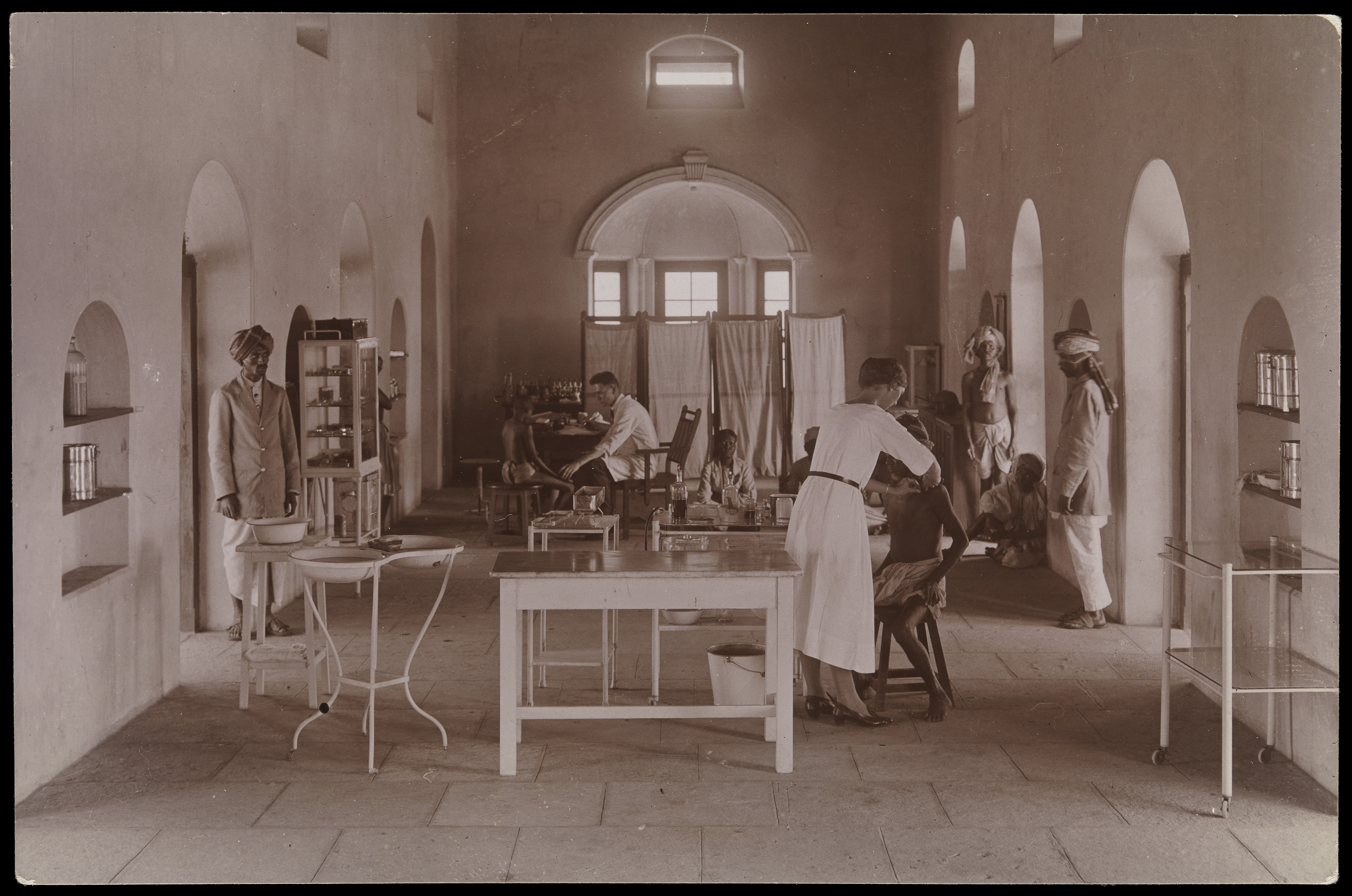
Medics treating leprosy patients in one of the hospital wards of the leprosy hospital that Narsa Goud helped to found.

In Dichpalle, Goud donated 30 acres of land, and supported Isabel Kerr and her husband to apply for funding from Mir Osman Ali Khan, to establish a leprosy centre. This was the first of its kind in India.

During the sixth Andhra Mahasabha, held in Nizamabad in 1937, he arranged for thousands of meals for attendees, and for wells to be dug to hydrate travellers along the route from Mancharya to Nizamabad.

He provided houses and sandals for the poor.

Goud was instrumental in establishing the first maternity hospital (Jajgikhana) in Nizamabad district. He was responsible also for setting up the first girls' school in the district.

== Honours and legacy ==
Goud did not like publicity. Goud's son had installed a plaque in the maternity hospital stating that Narsa Goud had built it, but when Narsa Goud discovered this, he removed the plaque.

Goud accepted the title of Raja, bestowed by Mir Osman Ali Khan. King George V gave a medal to Goud during a 1930 visit, in recognition of his service to his community.

The area where Goud lived is called Narsa Goud Kalani.

Goud's granddaughter Bomma Hemadevi is a novelist and granddaughter R. Akhileshwari is known as the first female journalist in the area.

== Death ==
Raja Narsa Goud died on 4 April 1948 at the age of 82. His death occurred during the Standstill Agreement when Razakars paramilitaries were active. Goud's family were nervous of taking his body to the crematorium for fear of encountering violence, but Muslims that they met along the way helped to carry Narsa Goud's body with them, in respect for Goud's support of people of different castes and creeds.
