= V. R. Khanolkar =

Indian pathologist (1895–1978)

- Born: 13 April 1895
- Died: 29 October 1978 (aged 83)
- Education: University of London
- Awards: Padma Bhushan (1954)
- Scientific career
- Fields: Pathology, Cancer

Vasant Ramji Khanolkar (13 April 1895 – 29 October 1978), better known as V. R. Khanolkar, was an Indian pathologist. He made major contributions to the epidemiology and understanding of cancer, blood groups, and leprosy. He has been called the "Father of Pathology and Medical Research in India."

He was born on 13 April 1895 in Gomantak Maratha Samaj Family. He studied medicine at the University of London and obtained his M.D. in Pathology in 1923. He was a Professor of Pathology in Grant Medical and Seth G. S. Medical Colleges in Mumbai.

He was also closely associated with the Tata Memorial Hospital and served as director of laboratories and research. The government of India appointed him a national research professor of medicine, a position which he held for ten years. He helped to organize the Indian Cancer Research Centre and served as director from its inception until 1973.

He was founder president of the Indian Association of Pathologists and Microbiologists. He published three books on cancer and leprosy and more than 100 scientific papers.

He received Padma Bhushan in 1955 from the Government of India.

He died October 29, 1978. The Dr. V. R. Khanolkar Oration was established in 1987 by the National Academy of Medical Sciences in his memory.

== Honorable positions ==
- president of the International Cancer Research Commission (1950–1954).
- president of the International Union Against Cancer.
- member of the World Health Organization panel on cancer and leprosy.
- member of the United Nations scientific committee on the effects of atomic radiation.
- member of the World Health Organization advisory committee on medical research.
- member of the governing body of the Council of Scientific and Industrial Research.
- vice-chancellor of Bombay University (1960–1963).
- chairman of the Biological and Medical Advisory Committee of the Atomic Energy Department, Government of India (1955–1960).

== Selected publications ==
- V. R. Khanolkar, Non-specific training of antibody production. The Journal of Pathology and Bacteriology, Volume 27, Issue 2, pages 181–186, 1924.
- V. R. Khanolkar, T. B. Panse, and V. D. Divekar. Gamma-Sitosteryl Glycoside in Tobacco. Science, 16 September 1955: Vol. 122. no. 3168, pp. 515 – 516
- Sanghvi, L. D.; Rao, K. C. M.; Khanolkar, V. R. (7 May 1955). "Smoking and Chewing of Tobacco in Relation to Cancer of the Upper Alimentary Tract". British Medical Journal. 1 (4922): 1111–4. doi:10.1136/bmj.1.4922.1111. PMC 2061862. PMID 14363805.
- Khanolkar, V. R. (1 March 1961). "Diagnosis of Leprosy". Indian Journal of Dermatology, Venereology and Leprology. 27 (3): 59–68. ISSN 0378-6323. PMID 29244278.
