= Shri Krishna Sharma =

Pandit Shri Krishna Sharma
- Born: Rajkot, India
- Occupations: Arya Samaj preacher, Educator
- Years active: 1926–1956
- Known for: Promoting Arya Samaj in Fiji, Establishing Arya Samaj schools and temples, Founding the Hindu Maha Sabha
- Notable work: Vedic Sandesh, Founding of D.A.V. College Suva
- Movement: Arya Samaj

Pandit Shri Krishna Sharma was an Arya Samaj preacher who came to Fiji in 1926 from Rajkot, India. He was a gifted public speaker and singer of religious songs. He provided impetus to the Arya Samaj movement in Fiji. Under his influence Arya Samaj schools and temples were established in Fiji. He was responsible for the establishment of the Hindu Maha Sabha for the purpose of uniting all Hindus in Fiji. He advocated shuddhi (reconversion to Hinduism) and this caused conflict with Muslims and Christians in Fiji.

Sharma also started a monthly Hindi language newspaper called the Vedic Sandesh.

He returned to India in 1929 and the Government of Fiji refused permission for him to return to Fiji.

In 1956, he returned to Fiji to participate in the Golden Jubilee of the Arya Samaj in Fiji. He founded the D.A.V. College in Suva and an Arya temple in Nadi.

== See also ==
Arya Samaj in Fiji
