= Indian Association of Pathologists and Microbiologists =

Indian health organization

- Formation: 1949
- Legal status: Public
- Headquarters: Cuttack
- Website: www.iapm.net.in

The Indian Association of Pathologists and Microbiologists is a professional health organization of pathologists in India. It was founded in 1949. The founding president of the association was V. R. Khanolkar. Its objective is to promote the advancement of pathology, microbiology, and allied sciences. Its headquarters are located at Cuttack (Orissa, India). The association organises an annual meeting, which is held in different regions of the country. Its official journal is the Indian Journal of Pathology & Microbiology.

== Past presidents ==
The following persons have been presidents of the association:

- 1950-1952: V. R. Khanolkar
- 1953: B. P. Trivedi
- 1954: V. S. Manglik
- 1955: P. V. Gharpure
- 1956: C. G. Pandit
- 1957: R. N. Wahi
- 1958: D. Govinda Reddy
- 1959: P. G. Gollerkeri
- 1960: E. W. Gault
- 1961: G. L. Sharma
- 1962-1963: Y. M. Bhende
- 1964: B. L. Taneja
- 1965: Sarup Narain
- 1966: S. L. Kalra
- 1967: B . K . Aikat
- 1968: J. B. Chatterjea
- 1969: H. I. Jhala
- 1970: J. B. Shrivastava
- 1971-1972: V. Ramalingaswami
- 1973: K. C. Basu Mallik
- 1974: N. M. Purandare
- 1975: D. N. Gupta
- 1976: R. Ananthanarayan
- 1977: R. M. L. Mehrotra
- 1978: B. Bhaskara Reddy
- 1979: L. N. Mohapatra
- 1980: K. D. Sharma
- 1981: R. K. Gadgil
- 1982: J. N. Monga
- 1983: G. V. Talvalkar
- 1984: D. J. Reddy
- 1985: M. K. Bhargava
- 1986: S. G. Kinare
- 1987: Manoj Roy
- 1988: U. C. Chaturvedi
- 1989: Arun R. Chitale
- 1990: C. I. Jhala
- 1991: B. N. Datta
- 1992: U. L. Wagholikar
- 1993: S. J. Nagalotimath
- 1994: C. Lakshamanan
- 1995: K. P. Deodhar
- 1996: B. K . Nanda
- 1997: Balraman Nair
- 1998: K. S. Ratnakar
- 1999: Ila M. Vora
- 2000: A. M. Phatak
- 2001: P. Sivadas
- 2002: P. V. Patil
- 2003: R. K. Gupta
- 2004: S. K. Dutta
- 2005: J. R. Bhardwaj
- 2006: Kusum Joshi
- 2007: V. V. Taralaxmi
- 2008: Harish Mohan

== APCON ==
The annual conference of the association is called APCON organized since 1950. It was not held in the years 1962 and 1971. They are held in different cities across India.
