= Dichpally Ramalayam =

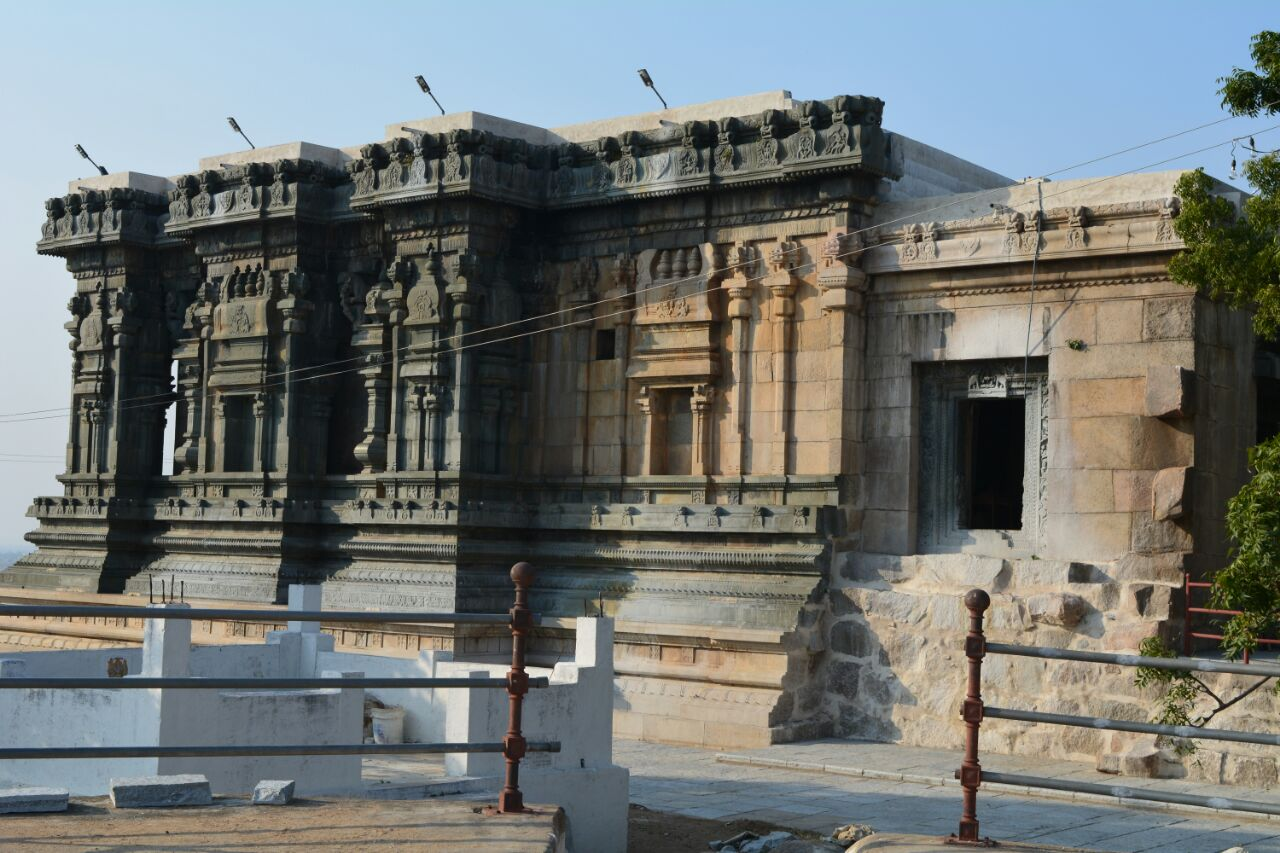

- Location in India

Religion
- Affiliation: Hinduism
- District: Nizamabad
- Deity: Bhagwan Rama

Location
- Location: Dichpally
- State: Telangana
- Country: India
- Coordinates: 18.58688°N 78.20629°E

Architecture
- Type: Kakatiya
- Creator: Kakatiya Kings
- Completed: 14th Century CE

Dichpally Ramalayam is a Lord Rama temple located in Dichpally Village of Nizamabad, Telangana built in 14th century by Kakatiya kings. As the temple has a lot of resemblance in its style and structure, it is also called the Indhoor Khajuraho or the Khajuraho of Nizamabad. This is also called Khilla Ramalayam

== Architecture ==
Temple was built of black and white basalt stone, with the finest architecture and excellent craftsmanship of goddesses, animals, devils and Khajuraho style erotic structures on it. This ancient temple has awesome sculpture with extremely beautiful carvings on temple walls, ceilings, pillars, and door frames.

The temple is enclosed by a masonry wall, with bastions at four corners, and a gateway facing the north.

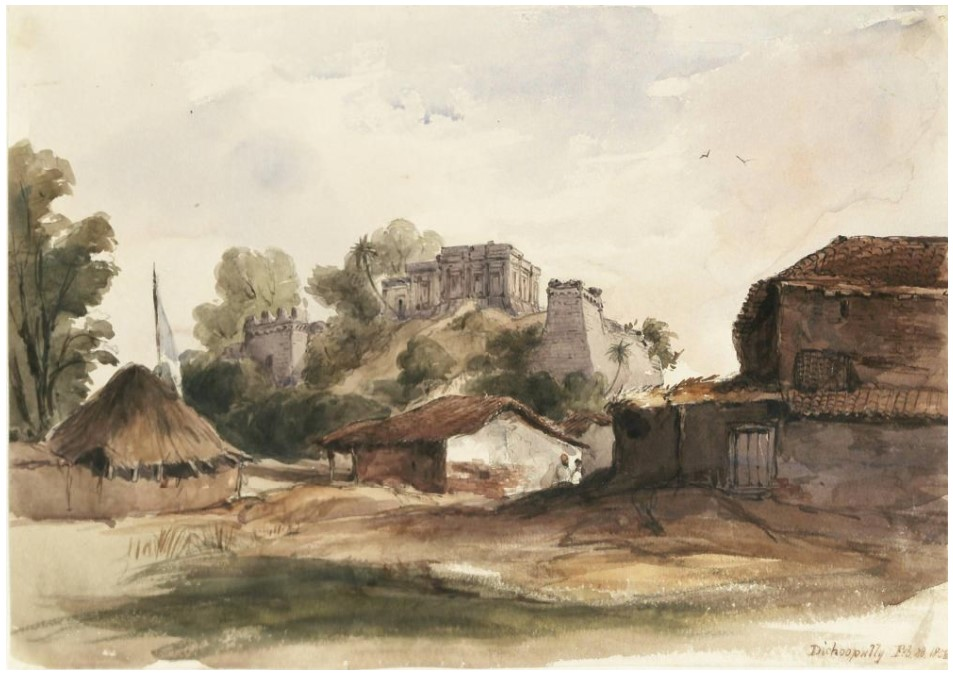
Dichoopully in 1858, by James Maurice Pimrose

This temple has 105 steps which the visitors have to walk in order to offer prayers to the deity. For the convenience of old and challenged people, the temple also has a pedestrian subway. The subway is also the common connecting link with the Raghunanda Temple. Each carving on the walls inside and outside of the temple stand as strong reminders of the Kakatiya glory. The temple is visited by thousands of devotees on the festival Sri Rama Navami.
