= R. Ananthanarayan =

Indian scientist (died 1998)

- Born: Thiruvananthapuram, Kerala
- Died: 1998
- Education: Madras Medical College, University of London
- Scientific career
- Fields: Microbiology, virology
- Institutions: Calicut Medical College, Kottayam Medical College

R. Ananthanarayan Ph.D. (died 1998) was an Indian microbiologist. He graduated from Madras Medical College in 1941 and joined the Army Medical Corps during the Second World War. He joined Stanley Medical College, Madras in 1946 and developed an interest in influenza. He obtained his Ph.D. from the London School of Hygiene & Tropical Medicine in 1953 with a thesis on "The Fabric of the Influenza virus". He became professor of bacteriology at Trivandrum Medical College. He was a member of the team set up to monitor the Asian Flu Pandemic in 1957–58. He served as principal of Calicut Medical College from 1961 to 1967 and subsequently of Kottayam Medical College. After retirement in 1969, he was professor of microbiology at Mahadevappa Rampure Medical College, Kalburgi. Ananthanarayan was president of the Indian Association of Pathologists and Microbiologists (1976) and the Kerala State branch of the Indian Medical Association. His work on "A. Asia 57" was recognized by the World Health Organization. He wrote a Textbook of Microbiology in collaboration with C. K. Jayaram Panicker, of which ten editions have been published.

== Bibliography ==
- Ananthanarayan, R.; Panicker, J.K. (2005) [1978]. Ananthanarayan and Panicker's Textbook of Microbiology (7 ed.). Orient BlackSwan. ISBN 81-250-2808-0.
