= Maunatul Islam Association of Fiji =

Islamic organization based in Fiji

- Abbreviation: MIAF
- Formation: 1942
- Formerly called: India Maunatul Islam Association of Fiji

Maunatul Islam Association of Fiji (MIAF) represents approximately 30% of the Sunni Muslims in Fiji who are mostly followers of the Shafi school of jurisprudence. The followers of Imam Shafi in Fiji are the descendants of Muslims of Malayalam origin who came to Fiji under the indenture system from Kerala in South India between 1903 and 1916. The other Sunni Muslim organisation in Fiji, the Fiji Muslim League, represents all other Sunni Muslims in Fiji who are mostly followers of the Hanafi school of jurisprudence.

== History ==
The organisation originally operated under the name of Then India Maunatul Islam Association of Fiji since it was officially formed in 1942. The key original officials were:

President:	Late Shahabud Dean
Vice President:	Late Hajji Moidin Koya
Secretary:	Mohammed Shafique
Treasurer:	Late Hon A. R. Manu

One of the most prominent past President and Speaker of the Association was the late Hon S.M. Koya, who was the leader of the National Federation Party and Leader of Opposition in Fiji for a number of years. The name of the Association was changed in 1982 to Maunatul Islam Association when a new constitution was drawn.

== Structure of the Association ==
=== National Council ===
Maunatul Islam’s head office is situated at 72 Vomo Street, Drasa/Vitogo, Lautoka at the Lautoka Branch Mosque. The Association is managed by the National Council and the working committee elected every two years at AGM of the Association. The current office bearers elected in 2010 are as follows:

Speaker:	Siddiq Faisal Koya
President:	Mohammed Rafiq
Vice President:	Ahmed Nazim
Vice President:	Abdul Kadar
Secretary:	Mohammed Arfad Ali
Assistant Secretary:	Hafiz Rahiman
Treasurer:	Hasmat Khan
Auditor:	Sheik Munif
Legal Advisor:	SFK

=== Office Bearers and Trustees ===
Trustee:	Sheik ul Islam Fiji Alim MSTP
Trustee:	Siddiq Faisal Koya
Trustee:	Mohammed Rafiq
Trustee:	[[Mohammed Rafiq [Master]]
Trustee:	Ahmed Nazim

=== Branches ===
MIAF has three main branches at Lautoka, Ba and Tavua and each branch has a Mosque and other properties. The legal ownership of all the properties are vested in the Trustees of the Association.

==== Lautoka Branch ====
The Lautoka Branch Mosque is situated at 72 Vomo St, Drasa /Vitogo, Lautoka. The Branch is managed by a Branch Committee elected every two years. Apart from the Mosque, the branch also owns a priest's quarters, 2 other residential properties and a Madrasa which can accommodate 30 students. The branch has approximately 1200 registered and 2000 unregistered members.

==== Ba Branch ====
The Ba Branch Mosque is situated at Maururu, Ba. The Branch is managed by a Branch Committee elected every two years. Apart from the Mosque, the branch also owns a priest's quarters, a 16-acre (65,000 m^{2}) cane farm and a Madrasa which can accommodate 40 students. The branch has approximately 800 registered and 2000 unregistered members.

==== Tavua Branch ====
Tavua Branch Mosque is situated at Tabavu St, Tavua Town. Branch is managed by a Branch Committee elected every two years. Apart from the Mosque, the branch also owns a priest's quarters, a 2 flat house residential property. The branch has approximately 400 registered and 1000 unregistered members

==== Prospective Branches ====
Followers of Imam Shafi are spread all over Fiji and there are plans to form Branches at Nadi, Suva and Nausori.

== Training and Education ==
MIAF has education and training centers at its mosques at Lautoka, Ba and Tavua. The priests at each mosque provide Islamic teachings to children as well as the adults. The National Council has formed an Education Board responsible for all educational matters of the Association. Adults are provided Islamic training and education on two evenings every week.

== See also ==
- Muslim
- Fiji Muslim League
- Islam in Fiji
