= M. S. Buksh =

Indo-Fijian community leader

Mirza Salim Buksh

Nominated Member of Legislative Council
- In office 1947–1950

Personal details
- Born: Madras, British India
- Died: 27 July 1967 Lautoka, Fiji

Mirza Salim Buksh (died 27 July 1967) was an Indo-Fijian community leader. One of the first Indo-Fijians to gain a formal education, he was chosen as one of the representatives of the Indian community on a number of occasions. He helped form and supported a number of social and religious organisations. He also served one term as a nominated member in the Legislative Council.

== Early life ==
Born in Madras, Buksh emigrated to Fiji in 1910, where he worked as an interpreter and clerk.

He was one of the early group of Indi-Fijians to acquire sufficient formal education to be employed in government service. In 1922, Buksh, together with Odin Ramrakha and Vishnu Deo, helped the Raju Commission that made inquiries into the conditions of the Indian community in Fiji. In 1924, he was one of the founding members of the Indian Reform League, the first social and sporting organisation formed for Fiji Indians. He was also a founding member of the Fiji Muslim League in 1926. He worked for the Supreme Court of Fiji and as a repatriation officer. Although he retired in 1939, he returned to work for the civil service during World War II.

== Involvement in politics ==
Buksh was a nominated member of the Legislative Council of Fiji in 1947, as an Indian nominated member by the Governor. He is remembered for an incident which caused a rift between A. D. Patel and Vishnu Deo. In 1948, when the Governor asked the five Indian members of the Legislative Council to elect one from amongst themselves to be a member of the Executive Council, A.D. Patel and Vishnu Deo both put forward their names. (The member elected into the Executive Council would have been recognised as the leader of the Indian community.) Ami Chandra supported Vishnu Deo, whereas James Madhavan, supported A.D. Patel. Buksh regarded both Patel and Deo as capable and could not make up his mind as to whom to support. Fully aware that Buksh did not regard himself as worthy of the position, A.D. Patel nominated him. Flattered with this support, Buksh returned the favour and threw his support behind Patel. Buksh said afterwards, "I garlanded him with the garland he offered me."

== Family life ==
He married Sarah Florence Whippy and had seven children, including Mirza Namrud Buksh.
