= Rabindra Nath Chaudhuri =

Indian physician (1901–1981)

- Born: 1901; West Bengal, India
- Died: 6 August 1981 (aged 79–80); Calcutta, India
- Occupations: Physician; Medical Academic
- Years active: 1934–1981
- Known for: Tropical Medicine
- Awards: Padma Bhushan; RCPE ANB Prize; ICMR Kamala Menon Medical Research Award

Rabindra Nath Chaudhuri (1901 – 6 August 1981) was an Indian physician, medical academic and the director of the Calcutta School of Tropical Medicine.

== Early life and education ==
Born in West Bengal in 1901, he graduated in medicine from the University of Calcutta before securing his MRCP degree from the Royal College of Physicians of Edinburgh and the degree of TDD from Wales.

== Career ==
He started his career as an assistant professor at the Calcutta School of Tropical Medicine in 1934 where he became a professor in 1945 and the director of the institution in 1950 before superannuating in 1966. He also served at Carmichael Hospital for Tropical Diseases as a Superintendent and Senior Physician.

Chaudhuri is known to have done extensive research on diseases such as Cholera, Malaria, Amoebiasis and Hypoproteinemia and was credited with contributions to chemotherapy and chemoprophylaxis of malaria. He sat in the Asiatic Society as a member, edited the Indian Medical Gazette and was a member of the Indian National Science Academy during 1968–70.

He was also associated with the Indian Medical Association, the Indian Association of Pathologists and Microbiologists, the International Congress of Tropical Medicine and Malaria and the Indian Association for the Advancement of Medical Education as a member, presided over the Medical and Veterinary Section of the Indian Science Congress and served the Royal Society of Tropical Medicine and Hygiene as its vice president during 1973–74. He was a founder fellow of the National Academy of Medical Sciences and an elected fellow of the Indian National Science Academy and the Royal Society of Tropical Medicine and Hygiene, London.

The Government of India awarded Chaudhuri the third-highest civilian honour of the Padma Bhushan, in 1960, for his contributions to medical science. He also received the ANB Prize of the Royal College of Physicians of Edinburgh in 1968 and the Kamala Menon Medical Research Award of the Indian Council of Medical Research in 1977. He died on 6 August 1981, at the age of 80.

== See also ==
- Calcutta School of Tropical Medicine
