= Calcutta School of Tropical Medicine =

Medical research institute in Kolkata, India

- Heritage Institution for Tropical Diseases
- Established: 24 February 1914 (112 years ago)
- Research type: Medical research
- Field of research: Tropical diseases; Infectious Diseases; Regenerative medicine; Translational research; HIV/HBV Co-infection; Hepatitis B anti-viral therapy
- Director: Dr. Dibakar Haldar (acting)
- Location: Kolkata, West Bengal, India; 22°34′31″N 88°21′36″E
- Campus: 108, Chittaranjan Ave, Calcutta Medical College, College Square, Kolkata, West Bengal 700073
- Founder: Leonard Rogers
- Affiliations: WBUHS; NMC; Jadavpur University
- Website: www.stmkolkata.org

Calcutta School of Tropical Medicine (CSTM) is a medical institute from Kolkata, India, dedicated in the field of tropical disease. It was established in 1914 by Leonard Rogers (1868–1962) of the Indian Medical Service, professor of pathology at the Medical College and Hospital, Kolkata. It was, till 2003, affiliated with the University of Calcutta. Now it is under the West Bengal University of Health Sciences.

Prominent researchers like U. N. Bramhachari, Ernest Muir, Ronald Ross, Rabindra Nath Chaudhuri, Ram Narayan Chakravarti and Jyoti Bhusan Chatterjee worked in this institute.

== Notable alumni ==
- Ram Baran Yadav, first President of Nepal.
- Baba Amte, Indian social worker and social activist who worked for the empowerment and rehabilitation of people suffering from leprosy.
