= Ram Narayan Chakravarti =

Indian phytochemist

- Born: 1916; Bengal Presidency, India
- Died: 31 May 2007
- Occupations: Phytochemist; Organic chemist
- Known for: Medicinal chemistry
- Awards: Padma Bhushan

Ram Narayan Chakravarti (1916–2007) was an Indian phytochemist, scientist and the Director of the erstwhile Indian Institute of Experimental Medicine (present-day Indian Institute of Chemical Biology), known for his contributions to the science of medicinal chemistry. Born in 1916, he secured a DSc from Kolkata University and worked as a Professor and the deputy director of the Calcutta School of Tropical Medicine before becoming the director of the Indian Institute of Experimental Medicine. His researches were reported to have assisted studies of medicinal plants and have been documented by way of several articles published by him. He was a fellow of the Royal Society of Chemistry and an elected fellow of the Indian National Science Academy. The Government of India awarded him the third highest civilian honour of the Padma Bhushan, in 1972, for his contributions to science. He died on 31 May 2007, at the age of 91. The Post Graduate Institute of Medical Education and Research (PGIMER) has instituted an annual oration, Professor R.N. Chakravarti Memorial Oration Lecture, in honour of Chakravarti.
