= Leonard Rogers =

British parasitologist and tropical physician

Sir Leonard Rogers
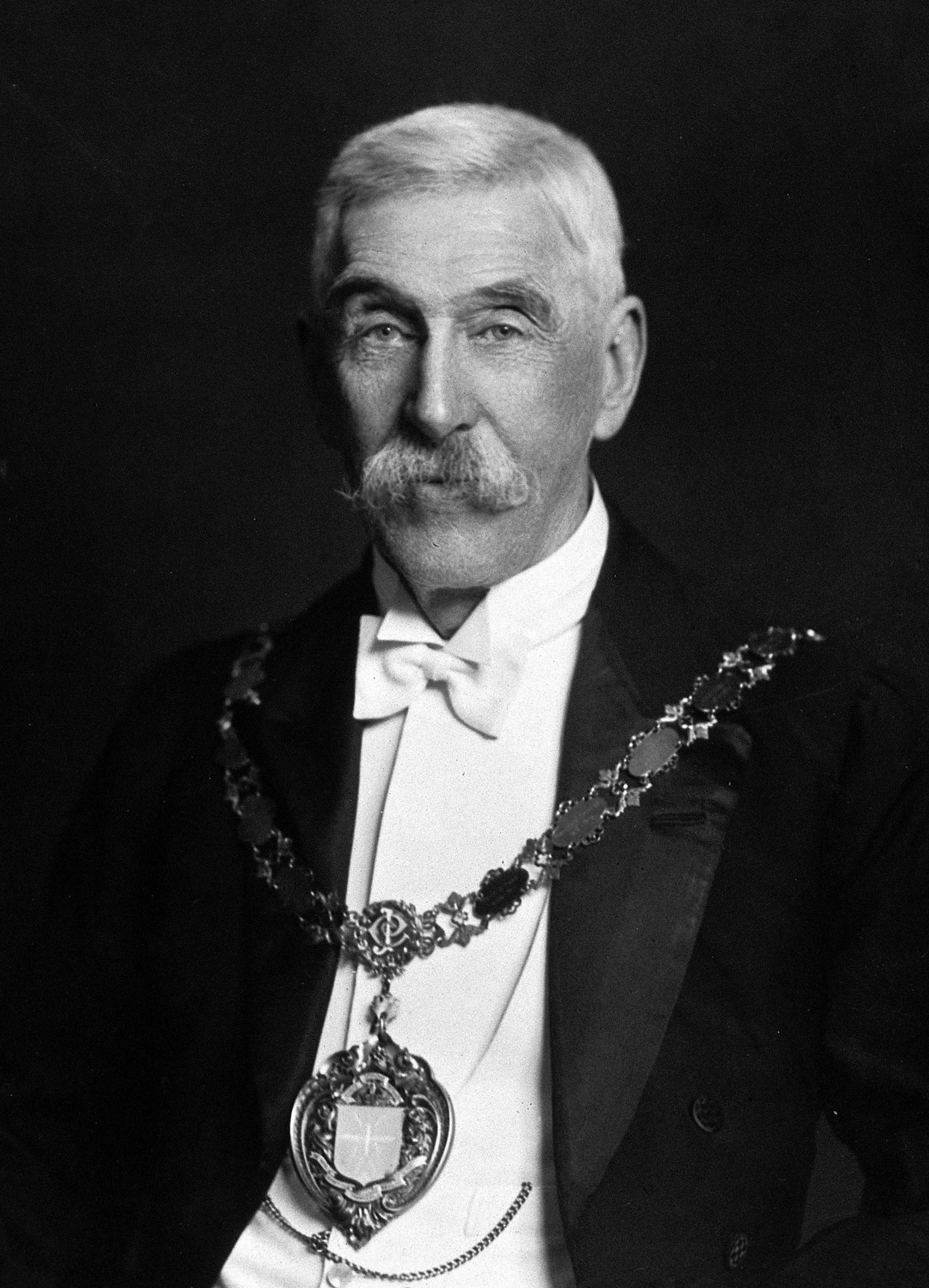
- Sir Leonard Rogers
- Born: 18 January 1868; Hartley House, Plymouth, Devon, England
- Died: 16 September 1962 (aged 94); Royal Cornwall Infirmary, Truro, Cornwall, England
- Known for: Founding the Royal Society of Tropical Medicine and Hygiene
- Spouse: Una Elsie North
- Children: 3 sons
- Awards: Companion of the Order of the Indian Empire (1914); Fellow of the Royal Society; Cameron Prize for Therapeutics of the University of Edinburgh (1929); Knight Commander of the Order of the Star of India (1932); Manson Medal (1938)
- Scientific career
- Fields: Tropical medicine

Sir Leonard Rogers KCSI CIE FRS FRCP FRCS (18 January 1868 – 16 September 1962) was a founder member of the Royal Society of Tropical Medicine and Hygiene, and its President from 1933 to 1935.

== Biography ==
Rogers studied at Plymouth College and worked at St Mary’s Hospital. He qualified M.R.C.S., L.R.C.P. (1891) F.R.C.S. (1892) in London.

Rogers had a wide range of interests in tropical medicine, from the study of kala-azar epidemics to sea snake venoms, but is best known for pioneering the treatment of cholera with hypertonic saline, which has saved a multitude of lives. He also championed Indian chaulmoogra oil as a treatment for Hansen's disease (leprosy).

Rogers was one of the pioneers in setting up the Calcutta School of Tropical Medicine (CSTM) in Calcutta, India. In 1929, Rogers was awarded the Cameron Prize for Therapeutics of the University of Edinburgh.

He was president of the 1919 session of the Indian Science Congress.

== Vivisection ==
Rogers defended vivisection and criticized the arguments of the anti-vivisection movement. He authored a book, The Truth about Vivisection in 1937.

He was honorary treasurer of the Research Defence Society. Rogers played a leading part in obtaining a ruling from the High Court sustained by the Appeal Court and House of Lords that anti-vivisection organizations can not be regarded as charities.

== Selected publications ==
- Experimental Investigation of the Effects of Haemostatic and Other Drugs on the Intravascular Coagulability of the Blood, 1895.
- On the Influence of Variations of the Ground-Water Level on the Prevalence of Malarial Fevers, 1895.
- Report on the Epidemic of Malarial Fever in Assam, 1897.
- Resolution on Dr Rogers' Report on Kala Azar, 1897.
- Fevers in the Tropics, 1908.
- Leprosy, Bristol: J. Wright, 1925, with Ernest Muir.
