= Mirza Namrud Buksh =

Fijian television and radio personality, auctioneer and politician (1925-2007)

- Born: 1925
- Died: November 2007 (aged 81–82)
- Other name: Lulu Buksh

Mirza Namrud Buksh (January 1925 – 29 November 2007), commonly known in Fiji as "Lulu Buksh", was a popular Fijian radio and television personality, auctioneer and maverick politician. He was born to Mirza Salim Buksh (M. S. Buksh) and Sarah Florence Whippy at Naitonitoni, Navua in January 1925. He started off his career as a Customs Officer and later retired and became one of Fiji's renowned Auctioneers. He drew people with his strong character and great sense of humor. He died on 29 November 2007. He was married twice. His first wife was Amy Whippy to whom he had five children. He remarried Sera V Tupa in 2005 and has five children: Jacqueline Buksh, Amina Doar, Mirza Ethan Buksh, Mirza Tyrone Buksh and Reanee Buksh.
