= Indian Reform League =

The Indian Reform League was formed in Fiji in 1924, following the refusal of the Suva Y.M.C.A. to admit Indians. Its founder was A.W. McMillan of the New Zealand Y.M.C.A and educated Indians and Government clerks and interpreters such as M. S. Buksh, S. S. Chowla, John F. Grant, Ilahi Ramzan, and Ram Narayan Deoki. Its aim was to carry out social work and apply pressure for social reform, like changes to marriage laws. Since most of its members were Indian Christians, it soon acquired a sectional character.

It provided volunteer nurses during the typhoid epidemic of 1925. It had a women's wing known as the Stri Sewa Sabha (Women's Service League), founded in 1934, which carried out social work amongst Fiji Indian women. The League encouraged participation in sports, including in cricket, football, hockey and lawn tennis. In December 1927, it organised a schools football competition at Albert Park. Buoyed by the success of this tournament, the League met on 22 January 1928 and formed a Football Association committee which organised the first competition was on 26 May 1928 at the Marist Brothers High School ground. In 1936, the association was renamed, the Suva Football Association, which was one of the original Associations that formed the Fiji Indian Football Association.

The Indian Reform League, with its Indian Christian power base came into conflict with another group of organised Indians accused the League of encouraging Indians to give up their culture and adopt European customs. The league was eventually ended after local Fijians took over Fiji football.
