= Ram Narayan Deoki =

Ram Narayan (Ramsay) Deoki (1905 — 4 October 1964) was the first ordained Fiji Indian minister in the Methodist Church of Fiji and Rotuma.

== Family background ==
His father, Shiu Narayan Deoki, was initially a farmer in Navua but the decline in the sugar industry in the district forced him to move to Suva, where he set up a grocery business. In 1918, S. N. Deoki, together with 20 other members of his family converted to Christianity.

== Education ==
At the age of twenty-one he was sent to Melbourne High School to study with students much younger than him. He also studied biblical studies at the Methodist Home Mission College in Kew, Melbourne. In 1926, his name was put forward to be trained as a minister but there was opposition from Caucasian ministers who feared that he would have to be paid the same rates as themselves as there was no provision for an Indian minister in a Church dominated in Fiji by Fijian ministers. He worked for several years as a local preacher and teacher before being accepted on probation in 1934. He was finally ordained on 11 June 1939.

== His accomplishments ==
He was a minister for more than 20 years and as Secretary for Education in the Synod promoted the Missions schools. He was respected outside his church as well and served as District Commissioner for Boy Scouts in every district where he ministered. He fought for Indian autonomy in the Methodist Church in Fiji, fearing that integration of the Fijian and Indian Churches would lead to Indians being numerically swamped by indigenous Fijians. He served as the President of the Indian division of the Church.

He was also a founding member of the Indian Reform League, a social and sports organisation formed in 1924 to cater for the needs of Fiji Indians.

He died in Suva on 4 October 1964.

== Bibliography ==
- Wood, A. Harold (1978). Overseas Missions of the Australian Methodist Church: Volume III Fiji-Indian and Rotuma. Melbourne, Australia: ALdersgate Press. pp. 75–76, 81–83. ISBN 978-0-85571-061-3.
- First Indian Methodist minister honoured
