= Indian Anthropological Society =

Indian Anthropological Association
- Abbreviation: IAA
- Formation: 1969
- Type: INGO
- Location: Delhi, India
- Region served: Worldwide
- Official language: English
- Parent organization: International Council for Science (ICSU)
- Website: IAA Official website

Indian Anthropological Association (IAA) is the representative body of the professional anthropologists in India. Established in 1969, its headquarters are situated within the Department of Anthropology, University of Delhi and associated with World Council of Anthropological Associations (WCAA).

The journal of Indian Anthropological Association, Indian Anthropologist, was first published in 1971, and has been since published biannually in March and September every year.

== Overview ==
It focuses on the understanding of the diversity and variations that the Indian society, culture and population exhibit, without ignoring the important findings of the world of anthropology. It seeks to provide a platform to anthropologists and those working on allied disciplines, to promote interest and encourage research through publication of the journal and holding seminars and conferences.

== Initiatives ==
IAA publishes books, which provides valuable information to readers involved in anthropology. It also publishes the journal Indian Anthropologist biannually in March and September every year.

== See also ==
- Anthropological Survey of India
- Indian anthropologists
- History of anthropology
- Pooran Chand Joshi
