= Lepra (charity) =

UK-based international charity

Lepra (Leprosy Relief Association) is a UK-based international charity established in 1924, working to diagnose, treat, and rehabilitate people affected by leprosy. Lepra currently works in India and Bangladesh.

Lepra is a member of the International Federation of Anti-Leprosy Associations (ILEP), a federation of international non-governmental organisations committed to creating a world free of leprosy and of The UK Coalition against Neglected Tropical Diseases, a collaborative partnership between UK organisations actively engaged in the implementation and research of neglected tropical disease control. Other partners of Lepra include LEPRA India, London School of Hygiene and Tropical Medicine, the World Health Organization, and the BIG Lottery Fund, as well as a range of corporate partners.

== History ==
In 1923 Major General Sir Leonard Rogers, ex-Indian Medical Service, agreed to join Rev. Frank Oldrieve in forming a new association. Sir Leonard Rogers had been working on a treatment for leprosy based on chaulmoogra oil for several years and had recorded good results. On 12 July 1923, the British Empire Leprosy Relief Association (BELRA) was constituted at a meeting at the India Office, presided over by Viscount Chelmsford.

=== BELRA (1924-1964) ===
On 31 January 1924, the British Empire Leprosy Relief Association was officially founded by Rogers and Oldrieve, with the financial help of Sir Frank Carter, a Calcutta businessman and philanthropist. BELRA was inaugurated by the Prince of Wales (later King Edward VIII) at The Mansion House in London. The association stated its aim as "to rid the Empire of leprosy." It was set up as a medical organisation, spearheading outpatient work instead of the traditional method of (compulsory) segregation. Rogers believed, based on his experience, that it was important to treat leprosy in its earliest stages, and that the segregation system caused people to hide the illness for as long as possible. King Edward VI became the first Patron.

Lepra was founded in 1924 on two principles that, at the time, set the organisation apart. First, it acknowledged that leprosy was surrounded by superstition and myth, leading to prejudice and isolation for those affected by the disease. Lepra sought to move beyond these issues through "evidence-led" policies and practices. Second, Lepra was established as a secular charity, open to all faiths and beliefs, and claiming to favour none above another.

In 1929 Dr Robert Cochrane took over from Oldrieve and became BELRA's Medical and General Secretary.

In 1931 BELRA was recognised as the 'First leprosy prevention organisation' at the International Leprosy Congress in Manila.

In 1935 BELRA launched a Child Adoption Scheme as a method of raising funds for treatment of children who were patients of leprosy hospitals. The child patients were connected with UK sponsors. The royal family would later adopt children through BELRA's Child Adoption Scheme in 1947.

In 1945 BELRA became one of the first organisations to methodically trial Dapsone as a treatment for leprosy and record its impact.

In 1951 Dr Robert Cochrane became Leprosy Adviser to the UK Ministry of Health.

In 1952 The Queen became patron of BELRA.

In 1953 BELRA established the first leprosy research centre in Eastern Africa. The site for the East African Leprosy Research Centre was chosen to be within the grounds of the Itesio Leprosarium in Kenya. In 1959 the name of the centre was changed to Alupe. The centre is now known as The Centre for Infectious and Parasitic Diseases Control Research (CIPDCR) and is one of the 12 centres of the Kenya Medical Research Institute (KEMRI).

At the 1957 Annual General Meeting, following the decolonisation process of the British Empire, the association changed its name to the British Leprosy Relief Association, retaining the abbreviation BELRA.

In 1961 BELRA helped to develop Clofazimine (B663), which to this day remains a part of the multi drug therapy used for multi bacillary leprosy.

In 1962 A mobile exhibition van started touring the UK, promoting BELRA's work.

=== LEPRA (1964–2013) ===
In 1964 the association changed its name from BELRA to LEPRA.

In 1965 the High Commissioner for Malawi and LEPRA's president, Viscount Boyd, approved an agreement on the Malawi Pilot Leprosy Control project, which subsequently began work.

In 1974 LEPRA moved its headquarters from London to Colchester, where its offices are still based today.

As a result of research, in 1975 LEPRA became one of the first associations to use multidrug therapy for treating leprosy, to increase effectiveness and minimise drug resistance.

In 1976 LEPRA became a full member of the International Federation of Anti-Leprosy Associations (ILEP).

In 1992 LEPRA funded research into a new surgical technique to restore sense of touch and temperature to damaged feet and hands, in cooperation with the Royal College of Surgeons in London and a leprosy centre in India.

In 1996 LEPRA was chosen to be the partner charity for the BBC Children's Television programme Blue Peter in their 'Bring and Buy Sale' for leprosy. The appeal raised more than £2.8 million.

In 1998 LEPRA extended its work to helping people with tuberculosis and HIV/AIDS.

In 2000 LEPRA joined the World Health Organisation, ILEP, governments of major endemic countries, and other major organisations in the Global Alliance Against Leprosy.

In 2011 A study from the Blue Peter Health Research Centre identified new biomarkers to detect TB early in HIV-positive people.

=== Lepra (2013–) ===
In 2013, LEPRA was re-branded as Lepra and in 2014 celebrated its 90th birthday. This was celebrated with a special anniversary edition of its quarterly magazine Lepra News, including a timeline of many of Lepra's achievements over the years.

In 2017 Lepra's Museum was officially opened by Kate Anderson, Gt. Niece of Sir Frank Carter, one of Lepra's founding members.

In 2024 Lepra marked their centenary year with a range of events throughout the UK, including special events at the House of Commons, Westminster Cathedral and St. James's Palace.

== Leprosy Review ==
Each quarter, Lepra publishes Leprosy Review, an English-language scientific journal on leprosy. The open-access academic journal includes original papers on all aspects of leprosy, from research into medical, physical and social aspects of leprosy to information relevant to leprosy control.

A forerunner of Leprosy Review, named Leprosy Notes, was first published in 1928. In its first issue, Rev. Frank Oldrieve, as Secretary of the association, writes that the hope is "that leprosy workers in the British Empire will find these notes of service." He also invites readers to write in with any notes "on the results obtained from the various treatments that are being tried." In total, seven issues of Leprosy Notes are published across two years.

In 1930, the first issue of Leprosy Review is published, a larger and expanded version of Leprosy Notes, with Dr Robert Cochrane as its first editor. Its aim was to "meet the need for a quarterly periodical giving interesting and practical details to workers, especially to those who have made no attempt to specialise exclusively in the field of leprosy."

In 2004, Leprosy Review was cited as one of the top five medicine journals by the Institute of Scientific Information.

In 2017 Leprosy Review published an article arguing for a return to an active case finding strategy in endemic countries to reduce the numbers of people affected by leprosy.

The Leprosy Notes of 1928 and 1929 as well as all Leprosy Review issues from 1930 to 2001 are freely available online thanks to the Full Text Leprosy Project, an initiative of the Lauro de Souza Lima Institute of Secretary of Health of São Paulo, in cooperation with the Latin American and Caribbean Center on Health Sciences Information and The International Journal of Leprosy. Issues from 2002 onwards are available on Lepra's website.

== Current work ==
Lepra takes an integrated approach to reducing the incidence and impact of leprosy and lymphatic filariasis. In addition to treating the diseases, Lepra also aims to enable people to improve their livelihoods and overcome disability, discrimination and prejudice.

=== Locations ===
As of 2025 Lepra works in India (as LEPRA Society) and Bangladesh. Lepra's international office is based in Colchester, England.

Over the years Lepra has worked in multiple other countries, including Brazil, Kenya, Malawi, Nigeria, Sierra Leone, Uganda, and Zanzibar.

==== Bangladesh ====
In 2000, at the request of the government of Bangladesh, Lepra took over responsibility for leprosy control work in the Sirajganj and Pabna districts.

In 2006 Lepra established a system of "health camps" in Bangladesh to test for TB.

Lepra currently works in the Bogra district of Bangladesh with their Mind to Heart project.

=== LEPRA Society ===
LEPRA Society is a partner of Lepra, serving the needs of people affected by leprosy across India. While its history dates back to 1925, when Lepra started working in India, it was established as an independent Indian NGO in Hyderabad in 1988 to comply with Indian law. Lepra and LEPRA Society remain closely linked through governance and institutional structures and are a single consolidated charitable entity.

Lepra, through LEPRA Society, works in seven Indian states, namely Telangana, Andhra Pradesh, Jharkhand, Odisha, Madhya Pradesh, Bihar and Delhi. Lepra's projects in India include comprehensive referral centres where self-supporting groups in rural areas, across health education, bespoke footwear for disability, active case finding, livelihood support, reaction treatment and support, mental health counselling, health education, reconstructive surgery and training.

LEPRA Society of India held its inaugural meeting in Hyderabad on 3 August 1989.

In 1990 LEPRA began its BOLEP project in Sonepur, Odisha, India, which had the highest prevalence of leprosy in the world at the time. The project continues to this day.

The Blue Peter Public Health Centre, located in Hyderabad, was officially inaugurated in December 1999. It is a research centre as well as training and treatment facility for those with leprosy. It offers a unique combination of high-quality research and clinical practice.

In 2000 LEPRA introduced health education vans in India.

=== Services ===
==== Diagnosing and treating leprosy ====
One of Lepra's core activities is the diagnosis and treatment of leprosy. When a doctor, health worker or health volunteer suspects someone has leprosy, Lepra will test skin sensations to determine whether the person can feel their skin being touched with cotton wool, feather or a ballpoint. Another way to determine leprosy infection is by taking a skin smear from a nodule on the skin. The skin smear is only positive, however, if many leprosy bacilli are present, meaning that the patient is heavily infected.

Leprosy is treated by multi drug therapy (MDT), a combination of Dapsone and Rifampicin for six months in the case of low infection ("paucibillary"). For higher infection levels ("multi-bacillary"), Clofazimine is added to the MDT and the treatment period is lengthened to 12 months.

===== Early diagnoses and active case finding =====
Lepra also recognises the importance of early detection of leprosy. Their active case finding method involves a screening of people around an infected person. While previous methods focused specifically on people sharing a household with a person affected by leprosy, Lepra focuses on both household members and 20–25 households around an index-case and conducts systematic screening of communities, schools or other places where endemicity is thought to be high.

==== Lymphatic filariasis ====
Lymphatic filariasis is a parasitic disease contracted through the bite of an infected mosquito. It causes swelling of body parts and altering of the immune system.Although there is no cure for LF, Lepra implements a number of strategies to make the disease manageable for those affected. They travel to remote communities to teach self-care techniques to reduce swelling and pain. If feet are already severely deformed, Lepra provides people with custom-made protective footwear.

==== Health education and health worker training ====
In many of the places where Lepra works, basic health information is often lacking, both for the general public and for health workers. Lepra tries to remedy this by providing health education and health training.

Lepra uses health education vans to bring health information to people living in remote and rural areas. These vans visit villages to educate people about maintaining good health and informing them about the symptoms of leprosy, LF and other prevalent diseases.

Lepra has also visited schools to provide health education. This education includes teaching children the symptoms of leprosy so they can recognise the disease in themselves and their families. School visits are also an important step in dispelling leprosy myths and the stigma surrounding the disease.

Lepra works with governments to improve health worker training. Lepra also trains traditional doctors to recognise the symptoms of leprosy and other neglected diseases so they can refer patients to government facilities when needed.

To fill in the gaps in the health service, Lepra also works with community health volunteers who are trained to recognise symptoms and work in their own communities to spread health messages, follow up on cases, and refer suspected cases of illness to the correct health facilities.

==== Advocacy and challenging prejudice ====
People with leprosy or other diseases such as lymphatic filariasis often face stigma and prejudice from their communities, the government, or even their families. Such stigma often remains long after a person has been cured. Many people who have leprosy or used to have leprosy are forced to live in leprosy colonies across India and Bangladesh, isolated from their families and communities.

Lepra aims to fight prejudice and stigma by providing health education to the general population, as well as health worker training.

Lepra also provides support to people who face leprosy and other diseases in the form of counselling services at the Munger Referral Centre.

Lepra is actively working with national and state networks of people affected by leprosy and disability across India and Bangladesh to fight legal discrimination. This can involve educating clients about rights to land, disability and old age benefits, and basic human rights, and finding opportunities for clients to meet with government representatives and local authorities.

==== Self-help groups ====
In 2012 Lepra began self-help groups in India, Bangladesh and Mozambique for those affected by LF and leprosy. These groups advise people on how to best help themselves with health care and income generation.

At each meeting, members of the self-help groups make a small financial contribution to a group fund. This fund is then used to provide members with an interest-free business loan to finance business initiatives such as a local shop, goat rearing, or tailoring. Members of the group are also trained in group management skills, self-care, or advocacy skills.

==== Community disability care and protective footwear ====
Lepra teaches people how to care for their disabilities, so they are not left unable to work, and also provides people with protective footwear so they can get around more easily.

Lepra organises self-care camps in local communities where people can learn how to care for their disabilities through cleaning and physiotherapy techniques that they can then do at home. People with disabilities are invited to demonstrate to others how they can prevent infection and reduce the severity of their disabilities.

Lepra also provides basic self-care kits to people free of charge. These kits include a bar of soap, anti-bacterial ointment, cream to prevent fungal infections, and a towel.

Lepra provides people with leprosy and LF with specialist, made-to-fit shoes designed for each individual. Shoes provide comfort, encourage healing of wounds and ulcers, and prevent further injury and disability. They can also restore a person's dignity and challenge stigma within the community. Several shoe technicians are working in clinics and referral centres, while Lepra also has a few shoe vans driving across India providing the service to local communities.

==== Referral centres ====
When Lepra first sett up referral centres, people with leprosy were not allowed into hospitals or did not receive proper treatment due to stigma and doctors not specialising in the disease. Now, Lepra's referral centres provide services in areas where health facilities are lacking or unable to manage neglected diseases like leprosy or LF, and the disabilities they can cause. The services offered at these referral centres include testing, treatment, disability care, physiotherapy, ulcer care, reconstructive surgery and counselling to people affected by diseases as well as their families.

Lepra runs their referral centres in partnership with state and national health systems. They are often located in government health centres and hospitals. Ultimately, the aim is to hand them over to governments to ensure their sustainability.

==== Research and innovation ====
Lepra is one of the world's leading authorities on leprosy. Over the years, Lepra has conducted pioneering research in the treatment of leprosy and has been at the forefront of developing a cure and trialling a multitude of drug treatments.

Today research still forms an important part of Lepra's work, carrying out both scientific and field research to further knowledge of neglected diseases and the effects they have on poor communities.

Recent research has focused on active case finding, disability aids, diagnostic tools and the mental health needs of those affected by leprosy.

== Awards ==
In 2025, LEPRA Society was selected for the WHO South-East Asia Public Health Champion award. In 1998 Lepra received a National Lottery Charities Board award. That same year, Lepra achieved "Investors in People" status.

In 2003 Lepra's contributions to the fight against leprosy were recognised at the Third Meeting of the Global Alliance for the Elimination of Leprosy (GAEL) in Yangon, Myanmar.

== Ambassadors and patrons ==
Throughout Lepra's history, the reigning British monarch has consistently been a Lepra patron. King George VI became the first of the royal family to sponsor children through their adoption scheme at the time, and Queen Elizabeth II became patron of the British Empire Leprosy Relief Association (BELRA) in 1952 following his death. The Duke of Gloucester, Prince Richard, is the current vice-president of Lepra.

Lepra currently has multiple ambassadors who help to support and promote their work:

Fiona Duby has worked in 29 countries in Africa and Asia in health and development programmes in both the public and the private sector. She was awarded an MBE for services to Bangladesh in 1992 and an OBE for services to Nigeria in 1999. In 2000, she was invited to join Lepra's board of trustees. She became an ambassador in 2015.

Victoria Hislop is an author best known for her novel The Island, which features the island of Spinalonga, Greece's former leper colony. Hislop became an ambassador for Lepra in 2013 and has been to India to visit Lepra's projects.

Stuart Miles was one of the Blue Peter presenters at the time when Lepra was selected as the charity for Blue Peter's annual fundraiser in 1996. Miles has since visited projects, helping to raise awareness of leprosy and Lepra's appeals.

In 2018 Stuart Paver became a Lepra ambassador. He is the managing director of Pavers, the shoe company that has helped fund Lepra's Indian shoe vans.
