= Fiji Muslim League =

Islamic organization based in Fiji

- Abbreviation: FML
- Formation: 31 October 1926
- Founded at: Fiji
- Location: Fiji

Fiji Muslim League (FML) is an organisation founded in 1926 in Fiji. Following its foundation the organisation set up branches across the country. Most of the Muslim schools in Fiji are operated by the Fiji Muslim League.

== History ==
=== Formation ===
On 31 October 1926, The Fiji Muslim League was founded at the Jamia Masjid in Toorak.

=== Education ===
The Fiji Muslim League contributed for the education systems in Fiji. The first school launched by FML was the Suva Muslim Primary School. Fiji Muslim League currently owns and manages seventeen primary and five secondary schools plus a tertiary institution. Fiji Muslim League has also helped for tertiary studies for poor Muslims through loans. The IDB loans for these studies were given locally for information technology and the other for the study of medicine in Pakistan by Fiji Muslim League.

=== Politics ===
In 1929, Fiji Muslim League sought to acquire discrete representation for Muslims in the Fiji Legislative Council.

== See also ==
- Islam in Fiji
- Maunatul Islam Association of Fiji
