= Dichpalle =

Dichpally Dichpallle
- Suburb of Nizamabad
- Location in Telangana, India Dichpally (India)
- Coordinates: 18.5833°N 78.2000°E
- Country: India
- State: Telangana
- District: Nizamabad
- Elevation: 428 m (1,404 ft)

Languages
  - Official: Telugu, Urdu, Hindi
- Time zone: UTC+5:30 (IST)
- Postal code: 503175
- Vehicle registration: TS 16
- Website: telangana.gov.in

Dichpalle is a Mandal and Town in Nizamabad district in the state of Telangana in India.Situated next to NH44.

== Leprosy centre ==
Dr Isabel Kerr founded the Victoria Leprosy Hospital here in 1915. In the 1960s the leprosy centre that she founded had over 400 patients.
