= List of members of the Parliament of Fiji (2022–present) =

Members of the Parliament of Fiji. The current 55 elected members of the Parliament of Fiji were elected on 14 December 2022 in the 2022 general election.

Member	Party	Notes
Rosy Akbar	FijiFirst	
Frank Bainimarama	FijiFirst	
Alitia Bainivalu	People's Alliance	
Parveen Bala	FijiFirst	
Aliki Bia	FijiFirst	
Mosese Bulitavu	FijiFirst	
Hem Chand	FijiFirst	
Sakiasi Ditoka	People's Alliance	
Viliame Gavoka	SODELPA	Deputy Prime Minister, Minister for Tourism, Minister for Civil Aviation
Esrom Immanuel	People's Alliance	
Manoa Kamikamica	People's Alliance	Deputy Prime Minister, Minister for External Trade, Cooperatives and SMEs
Sashi Kiran	National Federation Party	
Sanjay Kirpal	FijiFirst	
Semi Koroilavesau	FijiFirst	
Faiyaz Koya	FijiFirst	
Premila Kumar	FijiFirst	
Shalen Kumar	FijiFirst	
Ketan Lal	FijiFirst	
Atonio Lalabalavu	People's Alliance	
Alvick Maharaj	FijiFirst	
Ioane Naivalurua	FijiFirst	
Maciu Nalumisa	People's Alliance	
Joseph Nand	FijiFirst	
Vijay Nath	FijiFirst	
Viliame Naupoto	FijiFirst	
Josaia Niudamu	FijiFirst	
Biman Prasad	National Federation Party	Deputy Prime Minister, Minister of Finance
Viam Pillay	FijiFirst	
Lenora Qereqeretabua	National Federation Party	
Sitiveni Rabuka	People's Alliance	Prime Minister, Minister for Foreign Affairs, Minister for Climate Change and Environment, Minister for the Civil Service, Minister for Information and Public Affairs
Aseri Radrodro	SODELPA	
Kalaveti Ravu	People's Alliance	
Vatimi Rayalu	People's Alliance	
Mahendra Reddy	FijiFirst	
Jese Saukuru	People's Alliance	
Aiyaz Sayed-Khaiyum	FijiFirst	
Inia Seruiratu	FijiFirst	
Rinesh Sharma	FijiFirst	
Agni Singh	National Federation Party	
Charan Jeath Singh	People's Alliance	
Lynda Tabuya	People's Alliance	
Pio Tikoduadua	National Federation Party	Minister for Home Affairs
Sakiusa Tubuna	People's Alliance	
Naisa Tuinaceva	FijiFirst	
Ro Tuisawau	People's Alliance	
Isikeli Tuiwailevu	People's Alliance	
Tomasi Tunabuna	People's Alliance	
Siromi Turaga	People's Alliance	Attorney-General, Minister for Justice
Jone Usamate	FijiFirst	
Rakuita Solesole Vakalalabure	People's Alliance	
Iliesa Vanawalu	People's Alliance	
Ifereimi Vasu	SODELPA	
Jovesa Vocea	People's Alliance	
Filimoni Vosarogo	People's Alliance	
Ifereimi Waqainabete	FijiFirst	
