= List of members of the Parliament of Fiji (2018–2022) =

The 51 elected members of the Parliament of Fiji were elected on 14 November 2018. They served until the 2022 general election.

Member	Party	Notes
Selai Adimaitoga	FijiFirst	
Rosy Akbar	FijiFirst	
Frank Bainimarama	FijiFirst	
Parveen Bala	FijiFirst	
Veena Bhatnagar	FijiFirst	
Mitieli Bulanauca	Social Democratic Liberal Party	
Mosese Bulitavu	Social Democratic Liberal Party	
Viliame Gavoka	Social Democratic Liberal Party	
Salik Ram Govind	FijiFirst	
Anare Jale	Social Democratic Liberal Party	
Teimumu Kepa	Social Democratic Liberal Party	
Sanjay Kirpal	FijiFirst	
Semi Koroilavesau	FijiFirst	
Premila Kumar	FijiFirst	
Inosi Kuridrani	Social Democratic Liberal Party	
Atonio Lalabalavu	Social Democratic Liberal Party	
Naiqama Lalabalavu	Social Democratic Liberal Party	
Mikaele Leawere	Social Democratic Liberal Party	
Jiko Luveni	Speaker	Died in office in December 2018. Replaced by Epeli Nailatikau
Alvikh Maharaj	FijiFirst	
Suliano Matanitobua	Social Democratic Liberal Party	
Alipate Nagata	FijiFirst	
Osea Naiqamu	FijiFirst	
Joseph Nand	FijiFirst	
Vijay Nath	FijiFirst	
Tevita Navurelevu	Social Democratic Liberal Party	
Niko Nawaikula	Social Democratic Liberal Party	
Alexander O'Connor	FijiFirst	
Viam Pillay	FijiFirst	
Vijendra Prakash	FijiFirst	
Biman Prasad	National Federation Party	
Lenora Qereqeretabua	National Federation Party	
Litia Qionibaravi	Social Democratic Liberal Party	
Sitiveni Rabuka	Social Democratic Liberal Party	Resigned 7 December 2020. Replaced by Tanya Waqanika
Aseri Radrodro	Social Democratic Liberal Party	
Salote Radrodro	Social Democratic Liberal Party	
Simione Rasova	Social Democratic Liberal Party	
Mahendra Reddy	FijiFirst	
Jese Saukuru	Social Democratic Liberal Party	
Aiyaz Sayed-Khaiyum	FijiFirst	
Inia Seruiratu	FijiFirst	
Rohit Sharma	FijiFirst	
Jale Sigarara	FijiFirst	
Ashneel Sudhakar	FijiFirst	Replaced by Faiyaz Koya in March 2020
Lynda Tabuya	Social Democratic Liberal Party	
Pio Tikoduadua	National Federation Party	
Filipe Tuisawau	Social Democratic Liberal Party	
Jone Usamate	FijiFirst	
George Vegnathan	FijiFirst	
Peceli Vosanibola	Social Democratic Liberal Party	
Mereseini Vuniwaqa	FijiFirst	
Ifereimi Waqainabete	FijiFirst	
Source: Fiji Times
