= 2026 in Fiji =

- Decades: 2000s; 2010s; 2020s
- See also: Other events of 2026; Timeline of Fijian history

Events of 2026 in Fiji.

== Incumbents ==
=== Government of Fiji ===
- President: Naiqama Lalabalavu
- Prime Minister: Sitiveni Rabuka
- Speaker: Filimoni Jitoko

=== Cabinet of Fiji ===
Portfolio	Portrait	Minister	Party
Prime Minister; Foreign Affairs; Climate Change and Environment; Civil Service; Information; Public Enterprises		Sitiveni Rabuka	PA
Minister for Finance; Commerce and Business Development		Esrom Immanuel	PA
Deputy Prime Minister; Tourism; Civil Aviation		Viliame Gavoka	SODELPA
Attorney General; Justice		Siromi Turaga	PA
Defence and Veteran Affairs		Pio Tikoduadua	NFP
Employment; Productivity and Industrial Relations		Agni Deo Singh	NFP
iTaukei Affairs; Culture, Heritage and Arts		Ifereimi Vasu	SODELPA
Education		Aseri Radrodro	SODELPA
Health and Medical Services		Atonio Lalabalavu	PA
Information		Lynda Tabuya	PA
Women, Children and Social Protectcion		Sashi Kiran	NFP
Fisheries & Forests		Alitia Bainivalu	PA
Lands and Mineral Resource		Filimoni Vosarogo	PA
Rural, Maritime Development and Disaster Management		Sakiasi Ditoka	PA
Multi-Ethnic Affairs; Sugar		Charan Jeath Singh	PA
Housing; Local Government		Maciu Katamotu	PA
Public Works; Transport		Filipe Tuisawau	PA
Youth and Sports		Jese Saukuru	PA
Agriculture and Waterways		Tomasi Tunabuna	PA
Minister for Environment and Climate Change		Mosese Bulitavu	Independent
Communication; Minister for Policing		Ioane Naivalurua	Independent
Minister for Immigration		Viliame Naupoto	Independent

== Events ==
=== February ===
- 16 February – Former prime minister Frank Bainimarama and former police commissioner Sitiveni Qiliho are arrested on charges of inciting mutiny against Fiji Military Forces commander Jone Kalouniwai in 2023.

=== March ===
- 19 March – Bainimarama and Qiliho plead not guilty to charges of inciting mutiny against Fiji Military Forces commander Kalouniwai.

=== June ===
- 2 June – Israel opens an embassy in Suva for the first time in 30 years.
- 22 June – Police confirm that over 60 parcels containing cocaine had washed up on beaches at various locations including the Lau Islands, Munia Island, Kadavu Island and Qamea over the past week.

=== July ===
- 6 July – The Fijian and Australian governments sign two bilateral defence and economic treaties in Suva.

=== September ===
- 16 September – Health minister Atonio Lalabalavu declares a national HIV emergency after the government confirms that one in 60 adults is living with the virus.

=== October ===
- 5 October – Prime Minister Sitiveni Rabuka announces a constitutional referendum for 9 December, after President Naiqama Lalabalavu assented to the National Referendum Act 2026.

=== November ===
- 18 November – Prime Minister Rabuka declares a national state of disaster in response to an El Niño drought.

=== Scheduled ===
- 9 December – 2026 Fijian constitutional referendum
- 2026 Fijian general election

== Holidays ==
- 1 January – New Year's Day
- 18 April – Good Friday
- 19 April – Easter Saturday
- 21 April – Easter Monday
- 7 September – Constitution Day
- 4 September – The Prophet's Birthday
- 10 October – Fiji Day
- 22 October – Diwali
- 25 December – Christmas Day
- 26 December – Boxing Day

== Deaths ==
- 11 February – Alifereti Dere, 64, rugby union player (national team) and coach (Fiji Sevens)
- 26 March – Epeli Nailatikau, 84, military officer, president (2009–2015), speaker of the House of Representatives (2001–2006), and vice-president (2009).
- 12 September – Agni Deo Singh, MP (2006, since 2022)
- 18 November – Jovesa Vocea, MP (since 2022)

== See also ==
- 2025–26 South Pacific cyclone season
- 2026 Pacific typhoon season
