= Second Rabuka government =

Government of Fiji, 2022–

- Cabinet of Fiji
- 2022–present
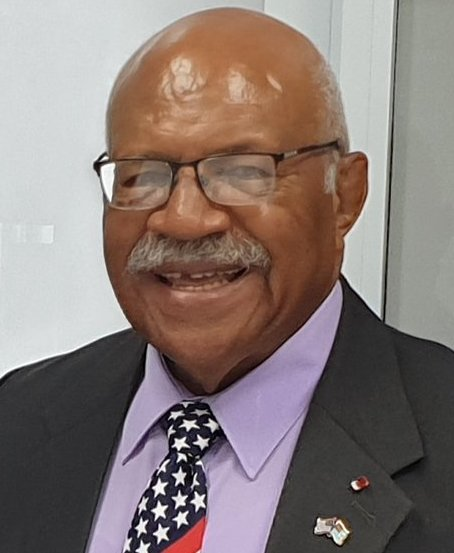
- Sitiveni Rabuka, Prime Minister
- Date formed: 24 December 2022

People and organisations
- President: Wiliame Katonivere
- Prime Minister: Sitiveni Rabuka
- Prime Minister's history: 2022-present
- Deputy Prime Minister (Note: Following the appointment of the Cabinet, Fiji received three Deputy Prime Ministers, one from each coalition party.): Bill Gavoka
- No. of ministers: 19
- Member parties: People's Alliance; NFP; SODELPA
- Status in legislature: Coalition government
- Opposition party: FijiFirst
- Opposition leader: Frank Bainimarama (2022–2023); Inia Seruiratu (2023–present)

History
- Election: 2022 general election
- Legislature term: 8th Republican Parliament
- Predecessor: Bainimarama lll

The second Rabuka government is the incumbent government of Fiji since 2022, following the 2022 Fijian general election. It is a coalition of three parties: the People's Alliance, the National Federation Party (NFP) and the Social Democratic Liberal Party (SODELPA).

== History ==
After the formation of the coalition government following the 2022 general election, which resulted in a hung parliament, Rabuka and his cabinet were sworn in on 23 December 2022, ten days after the election. The coalition parties won a total of 29 seats, three more than FijiFirst.

== List of executive members ==
Portfolio	Portrait	Minister	Party
Prime Minister; Foreign Affairs; Climate Change and Environment; Civil Service; Information; Public Enterprises		Sitiveni Rabuka	PA
Minister for Finance; Commerce and Business Development		Esrom Immanuel	PA
Deputy Prime Minister; Tourism; Civil Aviation		Viliame Gavoka	SODELPA
Attorney General; Justice		Siromi Turaga	PA
Defence and Veteran Affairs		Pio Tikoduadua	NFP
Employment; Productivity and Industrial Relations		Agni Deo Singh	NFP
iTaukei Affairs; Culture, Heritage and Arts		Ifereimi Vasu	SODELPA
Education		Aseri Radrodro	SODELPA
Health and Medical Services		Atonio Lalabalavu	PA
Information		Lynda Tabuya	PA
Women, Children and Social Protectcion		Sashi Kiran	NFP
Fisheries & Forests		Alitia Bainivalu	PA
Lands and Mineral Resource		Filimoni Vosarogo	PA
Rural, Maritime Development and Disaster Management		Sakiasi Ditoka	PA
Multi-Ethnic Affairs; Sugar		Charan Jeath Singh	PA
Housing; Local Government		Maciu Katamotu	PA
Public Works; Transport		Filipe Tuisawau	PA
Youth and Sports		Jese Saukuru	PA
Agriculture and Waterways		Tomasi Tunabuna	PA
Minister for Environment and Climate Change		Mosese Bulitavu	Independent
Communication; Minister for Policing		Ioane Naivalurua	Independent
Minister for Immigration		Viliame Naupoto	Independent

== See also ==
- First Rabuka government, the government of Fiji from 1992 until 1999 (also led by Rabuka)
