= 2024 in Fiji =

- Decades: 2000s; 2010s; 2020s
- See also: Other events of 2024; Timeline of Fijian history

Events of 2024 in Fiji.

== Incumbents ==
=== Government of Fiji ===
- President: Wiliame Katonivere (until 12 November); Naiqama Lalabalavu (since 12 November)
- Prime Minister: Sitiveni Rabuka
- Speaker: Naiqama Lalabalavu (until 12 November); Filimoni Jitoko (since 12 November)

=== Cabinet of Fiji ===
| Portfolio | Portrait | Minister | Party |
|---|---|---|---|
| Prime Minister; Foreign Affairs; Climate Change and Environment; Civil Service; Information; Public Enterprises | | Sitiveni Rabuka | PA |
| Minister for Finance; Commerce and Business Development | | Esrom Immanuel | PA |
| Deputy Prime Minister; Tourism; Civil Aviation | | Viliame Gavoka | SODELPA |
| Attorney General; Justice | | Siromi Turaga | PA |
| Defence and Veteran Affairs | | Pio Tikoduadua | NFP |
| Employment; Productivity and Industrial Relations | | Agni Deo Singh | NFP |
| iTaukei Affairs; Culture, Heritage and Arts | | Ifereimi Vasu | SODELPA |
| Education | | Aseri Radrodro | SODELPA |
| Health and Medical Services | | Atonio Lalabalavu | PA |
| Information | | Lynda Tabuya | PA |
| Women, Children and Social Protectcion | | Sashi Kiran | NFP |
| Fisheries & Forests | | Alitia Bainivalu | PA |
| Lands and Mineral Resource | | Filimoni Vosarogo | PA |
| Rural, Maritime Development and Disaster Management | | Sakiasi Ditoka | PA |
| Multi-Ethnic Affairs; Sugar | | Charan Jeath Singh | PA |
| Housing; Local Government | | Maciu Katamotu | PA |
| Public Works; Transport | | Filipe Tuisawau | PA |
| Youth and Sports | | Jese Saukuru | PA |
| Agriculture and Waterways | | Tomasi Tunabuna | PA |
| Minister for Environment and Climate Change | | Mosese Bulitavu | Independent |
| Communication; Minister for Policing | | Ioane Naivalurua | Independent |
| Minister for Immigration | | Viliame Naupoto | Independent |

== Events ==
=== May ===
- 7 May – Former prime minister Frank Bainimarama is convicted and sentenced to a one year prison term for obstructing a corruption investigation into the University of the South Pacific in 2020.

=== August ===
- 21 August – Minister for Women and Children Lynda Tabuya suggests restoring the death penalty to combat drug trafficking.

=== September ===
- 6 September – A controversy erupts over the Miss Universe Fiji 2024 pageant after both Manshika Prasad and Nadine Roberts claim to have won the title amid allegations of favouritism involving the latter. The Miss Universe Organization subsequently designates Prasad, who was crowned the winner in the coronation night, as the real winner.
- 19 September – Coup leader George Speight is released from prison after obtaining a pardon from President Wiliame Katonivere. Speight was imprisoned in 2002 for his role in the 2000 coup d'état in which ethnic Fijian nationalists attempted to overthrow Indo-Fijian Prime Minister Mahendra Chaudhry.
- 21 September – Fiji wins the 2024 World Rugby Pacific Nations Cup after defeating Japan 41-17 in the final in Osaka.

=== October ===
- 31 October – 2024 Fijian presidential election: Naiqama Lalabalavu is elected president.
- 8 November – Former Prime Minister Frank Bainimarama is released from prison early after serving six months for perverting justice.

=== November ===
- 12 November – Naiqama Lalabalavu is sworn in as the 7th president of Fiji.

=== December ===
- 5 December – The Parliament of Fiji passes a bill establishing the Fiji Truth and Reconciliation Commission to investigate coups and other instances of political violence in the country.
- 14 December – Seven tourists staying at the same resort in the Coral Coast are hospitalised for suspected alcohol poisoning.
- 26 December – Lynda Tabuya is dismissed as Minister for Women, Children and Poverty Alleviation amid controversy over an explicit video of her released online.

== Holidays ==
- 1 January – New Year's Day
- 29 March – Good Friday
- 30 March – Easter Saturday
- 1 April – Easter Monday
- 7 September – Constitution Day
- 16 September – The Prophet's Birthday
- 10 October – Fiji Day
- 1 November – Diwali
- 25 December – Christmas Day
- 26 December – Boxing Day

== Deaths ==
- 5 January – Vinod Patel, 84, football executive and politician, MP (1992–1999) and president of Ba (1986–2001).
- 14 July – Tupeni Baba, 82, academic and politician, deputy prime minister and minister for foreign affairs (1999–2000).
- 10 November – Ubayd Haider, 25, professional boxer, then-current Fijian Super featherweight title holder

== See also ==
- 2023–24 South Pacific cyclone season
- 2024 Pacific typhoon season
