= 2025 in Fiji =

- Decades: 2000s; 2010s; 2020s
- See also: Other events of 2025; Timeline of Fijian history

Events of 2025 in Fiji.

== Incumbents ==
=== Government of Fiji ===
- President: Naiqama Lalabalavu
- Prime Minister: Sitiveni Rabuka
- Speaker: Filimoni Jitoko

=== Cabinet of Fiji ===
Portfolio	Portrait	Minister	Party
Prime Minister; Foreign Affairs; Climate Change and Environment; Civil Service; Information; Public Enterprises		Sitiveni Rabuka	PA
Minister for Finance; Commerce and Business Development		Esrom Immanuel	PA
Deputy Prime Minister; Tourism; Civil Aviation		Viliame Gavoka	SODELPA
Attorney General; Justice		Siromi Turaga	PA
Defence and Veteran Affairs		Pio Tikoduadua	NFP
Employment; Productivity and Industrial Relations		Agni Deo Singh	NFP
iTaukei Affairs; Culture, Heritage and Arts		Ifereimi Vasu	SODELPA
Education		Aseri Radrodro	SODELPA
Health and Medical Services		Atonio Lalabalavu	PA
Information		Lynda Tabuya	PA
Women, Children and Social Protectcion		Sashi Kiran	NFP
Fisheries & Forests		Alitia Bainivalu	PA
Lands and Mineral Resource		Filimoni Vosarogo	PA
Rural, Maritime Development and Disaster Management		Sakiasi Ditoka	PA
Multi-Ethnic Affairs; Sugar		Charan Jeath Singh	PA
Housing; Local Government		Maciu Katamotu	PA
Public Works; Transport		Filipe Tuisawau	PA
Youth and Sports		Jese Saukuru	PA
Agriculture and Waterways		Tomasi Tunabuna	PA
Minister for Environment and Climate Change		Mosese Bulitavu	Independent
Communication; Minister for Policing		Ioane Naivalurua	Independent
Minister for Immigration		Viliame Naupoto	Independent

== Events ==
- 24 January – The Ministry of Health and Medical Services declares an outbreak of HIV in the country after recording 1,093 cases of the disease from January to September 2024.
- 1 February – Laijipa Naulivou is removed as director of rugby by the Fiji Rugby Union over homophobic comments made regarding the performance of the women's national team.
- 4 February – The Ministry of Health and Medical Services declares an outbreak of dengue in the Western Division after recording 200 cases of the disease since 1 January.
- 17 September – Fiji becomes the seventh country to open its embassy to Israel in Jerusalem.
- 15 December — The United States State Department threatens to reduce aid to Fiji unless the Fijian government takes action against a South Korean religious cult called the Grace Road Church, which has been accused of forced labour and human trafficking.

== Holidays ==
- 1 January – New Year's Day
- 18 April – Good Friday
- 19 April – Easter Saturday
- 21 April – Easter Monday
- 7 September – Constitution Day
- 4 September – The Prophet's Birthday
- 10 October – Fiji Day
- 22 October – Diwali
- 25 December – Christmas Day
- 26 December – Boxing Day

== Deaths ==
- 8 May – Josaia Raisuqe, 30, rugby union footballer (Stade Français, Nevers, Fiji 7s)
- 12 June – Vatimi Rayalu, MP (since 2022)

== See also ==
- 2024–25 South Pacific cyclone season
- 2025 Pacific typhoon season
