= Next Fijian general election =

- By 6 February 2027

All 55 seats in Parliament 28 seats needed for a majority
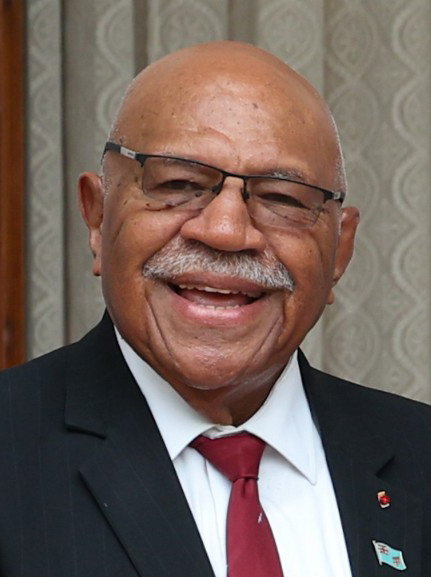

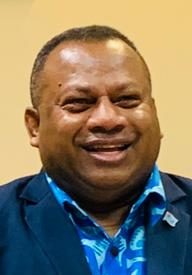

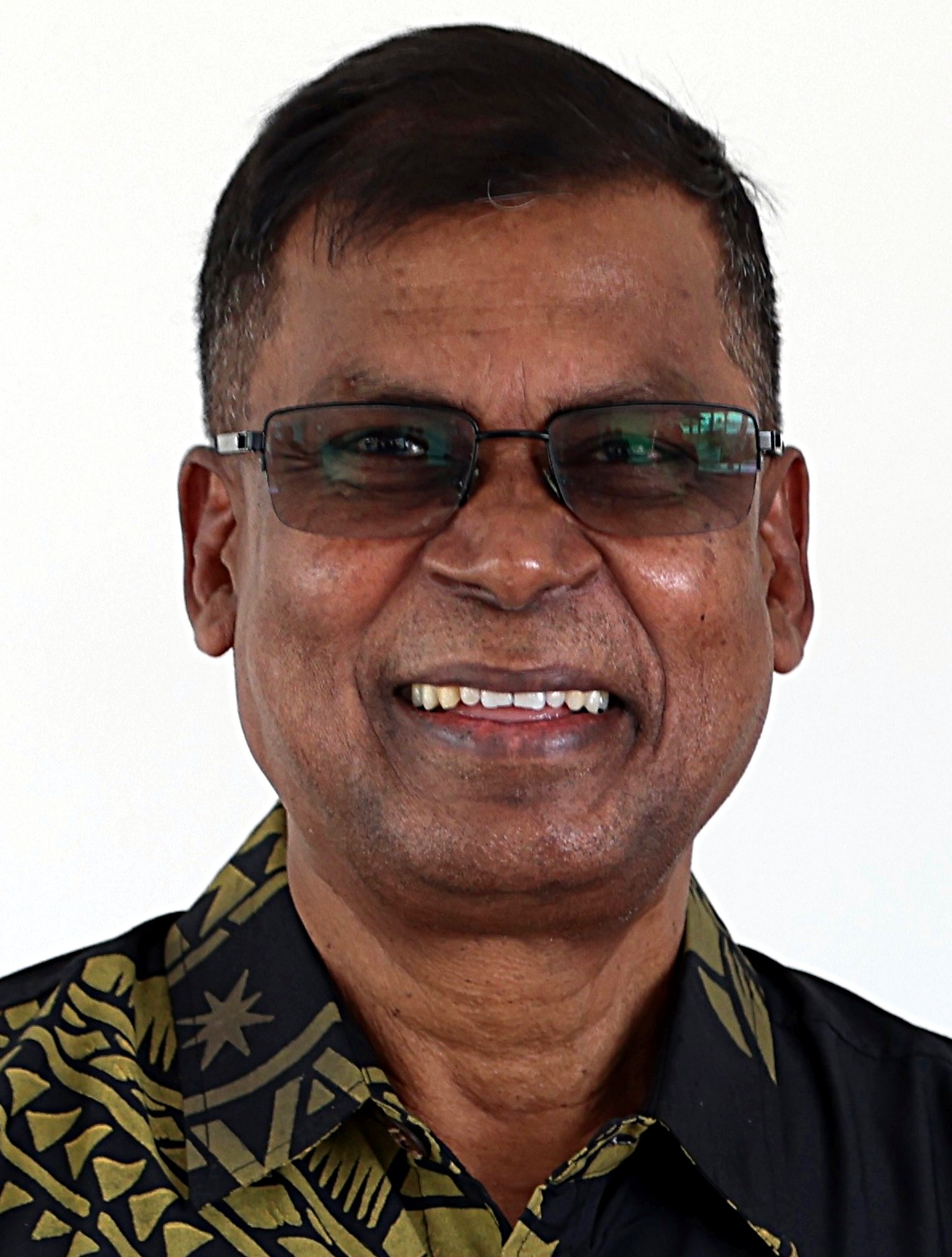

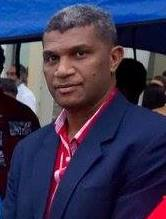
Leader	Sitiveni Rabuka	Inia Seruiratu
Party	People's Alliance	PFP
Last election	35.82%, 21 seats	Did not exist
Current seats	21	10
Seats needed	▲7	▲18
Leader	Biman Prasad	Aseri Radrodro
Party	NFP	SODELPA
Last election	8.89%, 5 seats	5.14%, 3 seats
Current seats	5	3
Seats needed	▲23	▲25
Incumbent Prime Minister
Sitiveni Rabuka
People's Alliance

General elections are due to be held in Fiji by 6 February 2027 to elect the 55 members of parliament. Prime Minister Sitiveni Rabuka and his coalition government, comprising the People's Alliance, the National Federation Party (NFP) and the Social Democratic Liberal Party (SODELPA), came to power after the 2022 general election, which ended the 16-year tenure of Prime Minister Frank Bainimarama and his two-term FijiFirst government. FijiFirst remained the largest party in parliament; however, after a period of turmoil, the party was deregistered in 2024. A bloc of its former members, including Opposition Leader Inia Seruiratu, formed the People First Party (PFP) in 2025, while another faction established the One Nation party.

In March 2026, the government initiated efforts to replace the 2013 constitution, aiming to have a new one implemented by 24 December. The opposition and civil society organisations condemned the government for attempting to adopt a new constitution within the timeframe of the general election. They called on them not to rush the process.

== Background ==
=== 2022 general election ===
During the previous election, the governing FijiFirst Party of Prime Minister Frank Bainimarama remained the largest party in parliament with 26 seats, but lost its majority. The newly formed People's Alliance Party, led by Sitiveni Rabuka, who defected from SODELPA, captured 21 seats, while its ally, the NFP, won five. SODELPA suffered heavy losses, retaining just three of the 21 seats it secured in 2018, but emerged as the kingmaker. Major campaign issues in the election included ethnic tensions, the national debt, the struggling economy and addressing poverty. During the count, when the People's Alliance was leading, a glitch occurred in the FEO app, causing it to go offline. Once the glitch was rectified, the app displayed FijiFirst in the lead. As a result, Rabuka, along with the leaders of the Labour Party, NFP and Unity Fiji, called for a recount and an independent audit. Rabuka also requested the military intervene, which its head, Major General Jone Kalouniwai, rejected. Election observers stated they had not encountered any significant voting irregularities and that the glitch had been addressed.

SODELPA was divided over who to form a government with; party elders reportedly preferred FijiFirst, while the youth wing favoured the People's Alliance and the NFP. The SODELPA board held two votes to determine with which bloc they would form a government. The first vote was voided due to alleged irregularities. Still, on the second ballot, the board narrowly voted to align with the People's Alliance and the NFP, bringing an end to the FijiFirst government's eight-year tenure and Bainimarama's 16-year premiership. Bainimarama became leader of the opposition and was succeeded by Rabuka as prime minister. Three deputy prime ministers were appointed to Rabuka's cabinet: NFP Leader Biman Prasad, SODELPA's Viliame Gavoka and Manoa Kamikamica.

=== Collapse of FijiFirst ===
In February 2023, Bainimarama was suspended from parliament for three years after claiming that the coalition government was divisive and accused President Wiliame Katonivere of aiding and abetting them. Bainimarama resigned as opposition leader the following month and was succeeded by Inia Seruiratu, although he continued to lead FijiFirst. Tensions in the party persisted, culminating in the expulsion of 17 of its lawmakers in May 2024, including Seruiratu, after they supported a pay rise for all MPs, against a directive by the party leadership. The expulsion occurred shortly after Bainimarama was sentenced to a year in prison for obstructing a police investigation. FijiFirst was deregistered the following month after failing to comply with the Political Parties Act, leaving its remaining MPs to sit as independents. Ten former FijiFirst MPs, including Seruiratu, formed the People First Party, which was registered with the Fijian Elections Office (FEO) in January 2026. Another bloc of FijiFirst members established the One Nation party, and had its registration approved by FEO several months later in June. One Nation was endorsed by Bainimarama in July.

=== Proposed constitutional reforms ===
The coalition government initiated efforts to draft a new constitution, with a constitutional review commission established in March 2026. Following deliberations with the public on the 2013 constitution, the commission presented its report to President Naiqama Lalabalavu in August, the details of which were disclosed to the public in September, during the time it was tabled in parliament. Included in the report's draft constitution were proposals to repeal immunity for past coup d'état leaders and facilitators and to encourage the military to prioritise defence. The draft also recommended replacing the unicameral parliament with a bicameral legislature comprising a 19-member Senate and a 41-member House of Representatives, and introducing a mixed-member proportional electoral system. The government stated that a new constitution could take effect by 24 December if passed by parliament and a referendum. Six civil society organisations criticised the government for initiating the reforms close to the constitutional election deadline, and warned that it would complicate efforts to hold an election on time. Nilesh Lal, the head of the Centre for Democracy and Dialogue, warned that an effective "self coup" could eventuate if a new constitution's implementation delayed an election, extended the term of parliament or the executive branch. Prasad criticised the "rushed process" and announced the NFP's opposition to the reforms. Opposition Leader Seruiratu said the government was "acting recklessly" and called on them to slow their efforts.

Parliament passed the second reading of the constitutional amendment bill on 5 October, initiating a month-long nationwide public consultation. Rabuka subsequently announced that a potential referendum would be scheduled for 9 December; however, parliament must approve the bill's third and final reading before it can occur. Initially scheduled for 2 November, parliament postponed the bill's final reading that day to allow an extra three weeks for public consultations. Prasad resigned from cabinet in October 2025 after being charged with corruption, but was acquitted in November 2026. Rabuka subsequently offered to reappoint him to the cabinet; however, Prasad refused to return unless the constitutional bill was delayed until after the election.

== Electoral system ==
Members of parliament are elected from a single nationwide constituency using open-list proportional representation with a 5% electoral threshold. Seats are allocated through the d'Hondt method. The number of candidates nominated by a party must not exceed the number of seats in parliament. Independents are also permitted to contest the election. To qualify, candidates must be Fijian citizens, registered voters, and have resided in the country for at least two years before being nominated. Ineligible individuals include those who have an undischarged bankruptcy, have received a legal conviction in the eight years before being nominated, hold a foreign nationality, or have been a member of the electoral commission for four years before being nominated. Elections must take place within four years after an outgoing parliament's first sitting date. The election is yet to be scheduled, the latest possible date is 6 February 2027.

=== Voters ===
All citizens aged 18 and older are eligible to vote. Voting is not mandatory, and upon registering, voters receive a 'VoterCard'. Voters may choose their preferred polling location when enrolling but are only permitted to cast their ballot at their chosen venue. Residents of remote regions, including the highlands and the outer islands, cast their ballots during the week before the election. Polling staff provide help for illiterate voters, while disabled electors have the option to receive assistance from an enrolled voter. The registration process for citizens remains open until the day when the president issues the election writ. Voters unable to travel to their polling station on election day may cast a postal vote in advance. Fijians residing abroad, along with residents who will not be present in Fiji on election day, are permitted to vote in this manner. Postal voting is also open to individuals who have a severe illness, have employment obligations, those citing religious beliefs and detained individuals.

== Parties ==
A total of 11 parties have registered to contest the election. In addition to the PFP and One Nation, other newly formed parties include the Liberation of Fiji Party and the NextGen Alliance.

Party	Leader(s)	2022 result		Ref(s).
Party	Leader(s)	Votes (%)	Seats	Ref(s).
People's Alliance	Sitiveni Rabuka	35.82%	21 / 55	
National Federation Party	Biman Prasad	8.89%	5 / 55	
Social Democratic Liberal Party	Aseri Radrodro	5.14%	3 / 55	
Unity Fiji	Savenaca Narube	2.78%	0 / 55	
Fiji Labour Party	Mahendra Chaudhry	2.70%	0 / 55	
We Unite Fiji Party	Ruveni Nadalo	1.29%	0 / 55	
All Peoples Party	Abel Camillo	0.56%	0 / 55	
People First Party	Inia Seruiratu	—N/a	—N/a	
NextGen Alliance Party	Apisai Moce	—N/a	—N/a	
One Nation	Tupou Draunidalo	—N/a	—N/a	
Liberation of Fiji Party	Manoa Malani, Veronica Malani	—N/a	—N/a	

== Campaign ==
The official campaign period commenced on 25 May. The electoral commission introduced campaign limitation rules in September to "level the playing field". The new rules prohibited the use of state and taxpayer-financed resources in campaigns to prevent sitting MPs from gaining an unfair advantage. Also included were a ban on campaigning and the distribution of campaign material at aged care and childhood facilities, hospitals, prisons, public libraries and government offices. Incumbent MPs and civil servants were also barred from campaigning while carrying out their official duties. On 1 October, parliament approved electoral amendments, which scrapped the 48-hour campaign blackout before election day and allowed candidates and parties to offer voters free transport to and from polling stations. The amendments also reduced the campaign-free areas around polling stations from 300 to 100 metres; however, candidates and parties would be permitted to display their logos, names, or symbols in these zones.

After announcing the date for the potential referendum, Rabuka requested that the electoral commission suspend the election campaign. The Centre for Democracy and Dialogue subsequently urged the electoral commission to reject the prime minister's request, arguing that it would be "illegal". Labour Party leader and former Prime Minister Mahendra Chaudhry also questioned the legality of Rabuka's directive and said that he did not have the power to order a campaign suspension, as a new constitution had yet to be approved.

== Opinion polling ==
=== Voting intentions ===
Polling firm	Polling date	Ref.	PAP	PFP	ON	NFP	SODELPA	UFP	FLP	NGAP	Others	Undecided	Sample Size	Lead
CCD	October 2026		27.5	10.9	5.7	12.5	13.1	13.6	8.0	6.7	2	—N/a	1,673	13.9
2022 election	14 December 2022		35.82	42.55 (Note: As FijiFirst, the de facto predecessor of the PFP and ON)		8.89	5.14	2.78	2.70	—N/a	0.4	—N/a	473,910	6.73

=== Leadership polling ===
==== Rabuka vs Bainimarama ====
Date	Firm	Better Prime Minister		Rabuka		Bainimarama	
Date	Firm	Rabuka	Bainimarama	Satisfied	Dissatisfied	Satisfied	Dissatisfied
3 Feb 2025	Lowy Institute	Not asked		51%	—N/a	33%	—N/a

== See also ==
- Next Fijian local elections
