= 2023 in Fiji =

- Decades: 2000s; 2010s; 2020s
- See also: Other events of 2023; Timeline of Fijian history

Events of 2023 in Fiji.

== Incumbents ==
=== Government of Fiji ===
- President: Wiliame Katonivere
- Prime Minister: Sitiveni Rabuka
- Speaker: Naiqama Lalabalavu

=== Cabinet of Fiji ===
Portfolio	Portrait	Minister	Party
Prime Minister; Foreign Affairs; Climate Change and Environment; Civil Service; Information; Public Enterprises		Sitiveni Rabuka	PA
Minister for Finance; Commerce and Business Development		Esrom Immanuel	PA
Deputy Prime Minister; Tourism; Civil Aviation		Viliame Gavoka	SODELPA
Attorney General; Justice		Siromi Turaga	PA
Defence and Veteran Affairs		Pio Tikoduadua	NFP
Employment; Productivity and Industrial Relations		Agni Deo Singh	NFP
iTaukei Affairs; Culture, Heritage and Arts		Ifereimi Vasu	SODELPA
Education		Aseri Radrodro	SODELPA
Health and Medical Services		Atonio Lalabalavu	PA
Information		Lynda Tabuya	PA
Women, Children and Social Protectcion		Sashi Kiran	NFP
Fisheries & Forests		Alitia Bainivalu	PA
Lands and Mineral Resource		Filimoni Vosarogo	PA
Rural, Maritime Development and Disaster Management		Sakiasi Ditoka	PA
Multi-Ethnic Affairs; Sugar		Charan Jeath Singh	PA
Housing; Local Government		Maciu Katamotu	PA
Public Works; Transport		Filipe Tuisawau	PA
Youth and Sports		Jese Saukuru	PA
Agriculture and Waterways		Tomasi Tunabuna	PA
Minister for Environment and Climate Change		Mosese Bulitavu	Independent
Communication; Minister for Policing		Ioane Naivalurua	Independent
Minister for Immigration		Viliame Naupoto	Independent

== Events ==
Ongoing – COVID-19 pandemic in Fiji

- 29 March: Prime Minister of Fiji Sitiveni Rabuka announces that the Media Industry Development Authority will repeal a controversial 2010 law which strictly controlled media in the country.
- 14 June: Fiji and New Zealand sign a defence pact in Suva, including military cooperation and humanitarian aid.

Scheduled

- 2023 Super Rugby Pacific season

== See also ==
- 2022–23 South Pacific cyclone season
- 2023 Pacific typhoon season
