= Rohit Sharma (Fijian politician) =

Fijian politician

Rohit Ritesh Sharma is a Fijian politician and former Member of the Parliament of Fiji for the FijiFirst Party, who served in the 7th Parliament of Fiji between 2018 and 2022. He had previously worked as a teacher and as a radio announcer.

In June 2020 Sharma appeared in court charged with assaulting his wife. He was released on bail.

Sharma was not included on his party's list for the 2022 general election.
