= People First Party (Fiji) =

- Abbreviation: PFP
- Leader: Inia Seruiratu
- Founder: Inia Seruiratu
- Founded: 19 January 2026
- Preceded by: FijiFirst
- Headquarters: 48 High Street, Toorak, Suva
- Political position: Centre
- Colours: Blue; Yellow
- Parliament: 10 / 55

The People First Party (PFP) is a Fijian political party. The party was registered on 19 January 2026. The party one of the political successors of the deregistered FijiFirst Party, along with One Nation.

== Ideologies and policies ==
The party leader Inia Seruiratu said that they do not have a manifesto as of August 2026 and will create one based on consultation with the Fijian people.

Inia Seruiratu said:

“We are well aware of issues confronting us as a nation and some of your concerns and challenges. We do not have a party manifesto at the moment because we first need to consult and hear you. We are people first. Your choices and proposals are important in the formulation of our party manifesto.”

== Current Members of Parliament ==
Image	Name
	Inia Seruiratu
	Jone Usamate
	Semi Koroilavesau
	Parveen Bala
	Alvick Maharaj
	Vijay Nath
	Rinesh Sharma
	Joseph Nand
	Virendra Lal
	Hem Chand
Source: FijiTimes
