= Next Fijian local elections =

Municipal elections were to be held in September 2026 in Fiji to elect members of various town councils, however they were postponed by Prime Minister Sitiveni Rabuka until after the next general election, saying rising global economic pressures and fiscal constraints have forced the delay. They will be the first local elections in the country since 2005.

== Background ==
Local elections have not been held in Fiji since 2005, despite council members being elected to three-year terms. One million dollars were added to the Fiji national budget to assist in holding these elections. Elections were originally planned in 2023, but were never held. The organisation of the elections was criticised by Deputy Opposition Leader Parveen Bala.

There will be 13 municipal elections and a formula was used to determine how many councilors are assigned to each municipality. The Ministry of Local Government also held meetings on the number of seats on each council.

Voters will be able to use the same cards that they use in general elections, and the cards were updated to indicate eligibility for voters throughout June 2025.

The Electoral (Local Government Elections) Regulations 2025 was approved by the Cabinet of Fiji on 19 August 2025, to replace the 1972 act of the same name. The Supervisor of Elections, Ana Mataiciwa, stated that it was unlikely that elections would be held in 2025 due to the small period of preparation time, but was confident that they would occur in 2026 if not by 2025. In December 2025, it was announced that the local elections would be scheduled for September 2026, with an exact date to be determined later. The elections were scheduled following increasing pressure by town councils over growing responsibility concerns.

== Electoral system ==
The election will be held using the first past the post system, where the candidate with the most votes wins. 141 total councillors will be elected, with voter registration opening on April 13. Candidate registration will open on the same day.
