= Leawere =

Leawere is a surname. Notable people with the surname include:

- Atonio Leawere, Fijian politician
- Kele Leawere (born 1974), Fijian rugby union player
- Mikaele Leawere, Fijian politician
- Sekove Leawere (born 1981), Fijian rugby union player
