= Salik Ram Govind =

Fijian politician

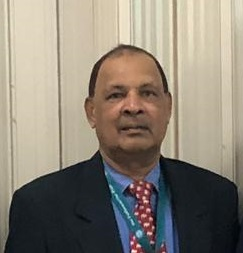
Salik Govind in 2019

Dr. Salik Ram Govind is a Fijian politician and former Member of the Parliament of Fiji for the FijiFirst Party. He was elected to Parliament in the 2018 election. He did not run for re-election in 2022 Election.
