= Jone Usamate =

Fijian politician

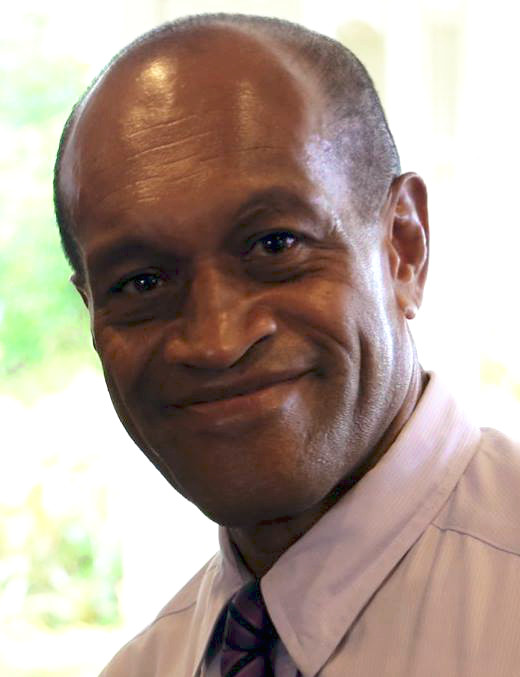
- Usamate at the Australian Embassy in Suva, December 2016

Deputy Leader of People's First
- Incumbent
- Assumed office 19 January 2026
- Prime Minister: Sitiveni Rabuka
- Preceded by: Office Established
Ministerial positions
Minister for Lands and Mineral Resources
In office 16 April 2020 – 24 December 2022
Prime Minister	Frank Bainimarama
Preceded by	Ashneel Sudhakar
Succeeded by	Filimoni Vosarogo
Minister for Infrastructure and Meteorological Services
In office 20 November 2018 – 24 December 2022
Prime Minister	Frank Bainimarama
Preceded by	Parveen Bala
Succeeded by	Filipe Tuisawau
Minister for Employment, Productivity and Industrial Relations
In office 17 September 2016 – 20 November 2018
Prime Minister	Frank Bainimarama
Preceded by	Semi Koroilavesau
Succeeded by	Parveen Bala
Minister for Health and Medical Services
In office 24 September 2014 – 17 September 2016
Prime Minister	Frank Bainimarama
Preceded by	Neil Sharma
Succeeded by	Rosy Akbar

Member of Parliament
- Incumbent
- Assumed office October 6th, 2014
- Appointed by: Frank Bainimarama
- President: Ratu Epeli Nailatikau; Jioji Konrote; Ratu Wiliame Katonivere; Ratu Naiqama Lalabalavu
- Prime Minister: Frank Bainimarama; Sitiveni Rabuka

Personal details
- Born: 2 April 1962 (age 64) Suva
- Party: Peoples First
- Other political affiliations: FijiFirst (Until 2024)
- Children: Four
- Education: University of the South Pacific (BA); Southern Cross University (MA)
- Alma mater: Lelean Memorial School
- Profession: Academic

Jone Usamate (born 2 April 1962, in Suva) is a Fijian politician, who served as the Minister for Infrastructure and Meteorological Services from 2014 to 2022 and Minister for Lands and Mineral Resources from 2020 to 2022 in the Fijian government.

Usamate studied at the Suva Infant School, Veiuto Primary, Levuka Public and the then Kalabu Fijian before attending Lelean Memorial School from 1974 to 1979. He studied at the University of the South Pacific and earned a Bachelor of Arts degree in administration and economics as well as a Master of Arts in management from Southern Cross University.

He was the chief executive officer for the Training and Productivity Authority of Fiji (TPAF) and was the Director for Technical and Vocational Education and Training at the Fiji National University.

In February 2012, he was appointed a Minister and sworn in by Fiji's President Ratu Epeli Nailatikau at Government House, Suva.

He stood for Fiji First in the 2014 general elections. He collected 939 votes and was elected as a Member of Parliament. He returned as a Government minister and left the Labour and Industrial Relations Ministry to become the Minister for Health. In September 2016, he was part of a cabinet shuffle and was moved to the Ministry for Employment Opportunities, Productivity and Industrial Relations.

Following the collapse of FijiFirst, Seruiratu remained in parliament as an independent, serving as chief whip of the opposition Group of 16 Bloc.

Jone was one of 10 members of supported and helped in the Creation of the People's First Party. He also the Deputy Leader of the Party.
