= Isikeli Tuiwailevu =

Fijian politician

Member of the Fijian Parliament for PA List
- Incumbent
- Assumed office 14 December 2022

Personal details
- Party: People's Alliance

Ratu Isikeli Tuiwailevu is a Fijian politician and member of the Parliament of Fiji. He is a member of the People's Alliance.

He was selected as a PA candidate in the 2022 Fijian general election, and was elected to Parliament, winning 3061 votes.
