= Sakiusa Tubuna =

Fijian politician

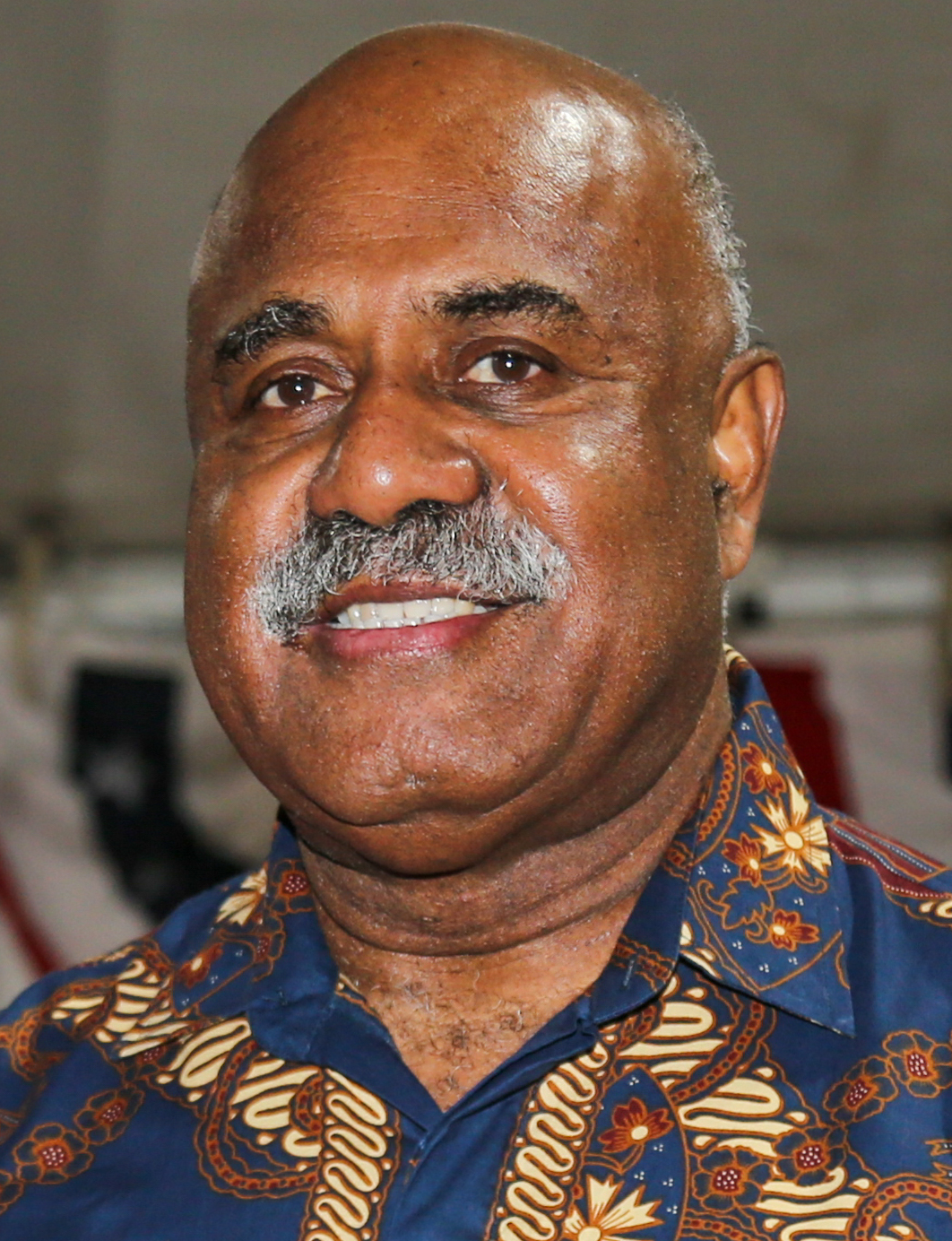

Member of the Fijian Parliament for PA List
- Incumbent
- Assumed office 14 December 2022

Personal details
- Party: People's Alliance

Sakiusa Tubuna is a Fijian politician and member of the Parliament of Fiji. He is a member of the People's Alliance.

Tubuna was educated at the University of New England and the University of the South Pacific. He worked as a civil servant for Fiji's Ministry of Agriculture before working as Sub-regional Coordinator for the Pacific for the International Fund for Agricultural Development. In April 2022 he was appointed to the board of the Fiji Crop and Livestock Council.

He was selected as a PA candidate in the 2022 Fijian general election, and was elected to Parliament, winning 2190 votes. On 24 December 2022 he was appointed Assistant Minister to the Prime Minister in the coalition government of Sitiveni Rabuka.
