= Bijai Prasad =

Fijian politician

Bijai Prasad was one of the eight nominees of the Leader of the Opposition to the Senate of Fiji after the 2006 elections. In 2014, he became Vice-President of the newly formed FijiFirst Party. However, he quickly resigned due to an undisclosed criminal conviction.
