= Kalaveti Ravu =

Fijian politician

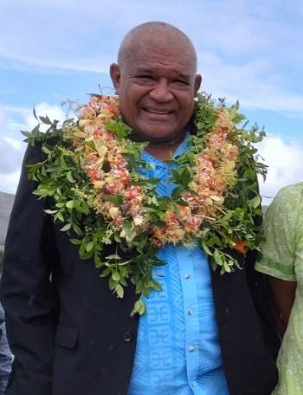

Minister for Fisheries and Forestry
- In office 24 December 2022 – 28 June 2024
- Prime Minister: Sitiveni Rabuka
- Succeeded by: Alitia Bainivalu

Member of the Fijian Parliament for PA List
- Incumbent
- Assumed office 14 December 2022

Personal details
- Party: People's Alliance

Kalaveti Vodo Ravu is a Fijian politician, and former Cabinet Minister. He is a member of the People's Alliance.

He contested the 2022 Fijian general election as a PA candidate and was elected with 1707 votes. On 24 December 2022 he was appointed Minister for Fisheries and Forestry in the coalition government of Sitiveni Rabuka.

On 27 June 2024 he was charged with one count of abuse of office over alleged interference in an investigation into illegal trade in Sea cucumber. He subsequently resigned as a Minister and was replaced by Alitia Bainivalu.
