= Rakuita Solesole Vakalalabure =

Fijian politician

Member of the Fijian Parliament for PA List
- Incumbent
- Assumed office 14 December 2022

Personal details
- Party: People's Alliance

Ratu Rakuita Solesole Sauramaeva Vakalalabure is a Fijian chief, politician and member of the Parliament of Fiji. He is a member of the People's Alliance.

He was selected as a PA candidate in the 2022 Fijian general election, and was elected to Parliament, winning 2460 votes. On 24 December 2022 he was appointed Assistant Minister for Home Affairs in the coalition government of Sitiveni Rabuka.
