= Iliesa Vanawalu =

Fijian politician

Member of the Fijian Parliament for PA List
- Incumbent
- Assumed office 14 December 2022

Personal details
- Party: People's Alliance

Iliesa Sovui Vanawalu is a Fijian politician and member of the Parliament of Fiji. He is a member of the People's Alliance.

Vanawalu is a former postal worker, who rose to be head of postal services at Post Fiji.

He was selected as a PA candidate in the 2022 Fijian general election, and was elected to Parliament, winning 2879 votes. On 24 December 2022 he was appointed Assistant Minister for Education in the coalition government of Sitiveni Rabuka.
