= Lenora Qereqeretabua =

Fijian broadcaster and politician (born 1968)

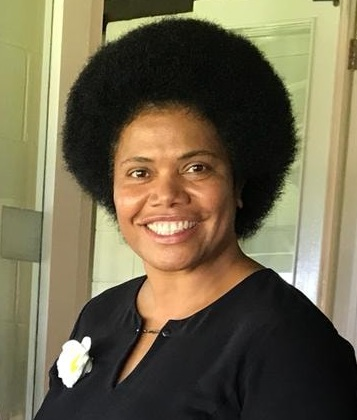
- Qereqeretabua in 2020

Deputy Speaker of the Parliament of Fiji
- Incumbent
- Assumed office 24 December 2022
- Prime Minister: Sitiveni Rabuka

Member of the Fijian Parliament for NFP List
- Incumbent
- Assumed office 14 November 2018

Personal details
- Born: March 1, 1968 (age 58) Dravuni, Fiji
- Party: National Federation Party

Lenora Salusalu Qereqeretabua (born 1 March 1968) is a Fijian broadcaster and politician. In December 2022, she was elected deputy speaker of the Parliament of Fiji. She is a member of the National Federation Party (NFP).

== Biography ==
Qereqeretabua was born in Dravuni, Kadavu Province, and is the daughter of former Miss Fiji Eta Uluvula Qereqeretabua. In 1988, following in the footsteps of her mother, Lenora was crowned Miss Fiji. Since 1995, she has anchored the Pacific Community's Pacific-wide news show, The Pacific Way. She also worked as a public relations consultant and serves on the board of Save the Children Fiji. In 2015, was appointed to the National Flag Committee.

In February 2018, she was announced as a candidate for the National Federation Party in the 2018 elections. During the election campaign she advocated for women's rights and more women in parliament. She won 1811 votes, winning the NFP's third seat in parliament. As an MP she advocated for a more professional media and the restoration of democracy in local government, as well as for the use of the Fijian language in parliament. In July 2019, she cut off her buiniga-styled hair to raise money for children with cancer. In September 2019, she was criticised for "cursing" members of the FijiFirst regime and their descendants after parliamentary staff who videoed Prime Minister Frank Bainimarama assaulting opposition MP Pio Tikoduadua were forced to resign. In November 2019, she attended the Pacific Parliamentary Forum in New Zealand.

She was re-elected in the 2022 Fijian general election with 3741 votes. On 24 December 2022, she was elected deputy speaker of the Parliament of Fiji, defeating Viliame Naupoto 28 votes to 27.

In February 2024, Lenora Qereqeretabua revealed she had attempted suicide following cyberbullying by Kishore Kumar.

== Controversies ==
=== Use of profanity in Parliament ===
In 2019, Qereqeretabua became the first person to ever use profanity on the floor of the Fijian Parliament. She claimed that then-Prime Minister Frank Bainimarama uttered the following Fijian profanities to Pio Tikoduadua:

… caiti tamamu, magai tinamu, sona levu and caiti iko.

Qereqeretabua gave literal translations of these terms.

Fijian	English	
Fijian	Literal translation	Rough English equivalent
Caiti tamamu	Have sexual relations with your father	Fuck your father, fatherfucker
Magai tinamu	Your mother's vagina	Your mother's cunt, motherfucker
Sona levu	An enlarged anus	Asshole
Caiti iko	Have sexual relations with yourself	Go fuck yourself

Therefore, while it is clear that, for example, the Fijian translation of the English word "fuck" is caiti, Qereqeretabua gave the literal translations (i.e "have sexual relations" for caiti) to avoid using unparliamentary language.

The Fiji Sun heavily criticised her usage of profanity in Parliament.
