= Ashneel Sudhakar =

Fijian politician

Ashneel Sudhakar is a Fijian politician and former Member of the Parliament of Fiji for the FijiFirst Party. He was the former Minister for Lands and Mineral Resources. He was re-elected to Parliament in the 2018 election. Sudhakar was the former Government Whip. On 13 March 2020, Prime Minister Bainimarama had dismissed Sudhakar as minister for lands and mineral resources following allegations of sexual harassment and misconduct. On 15 March, Sudhakar had resigned as member of parliament.
