= Rinesh Sharma =

Fijian entrepreneur and politician

The Honourable Rinesh Sharma MP
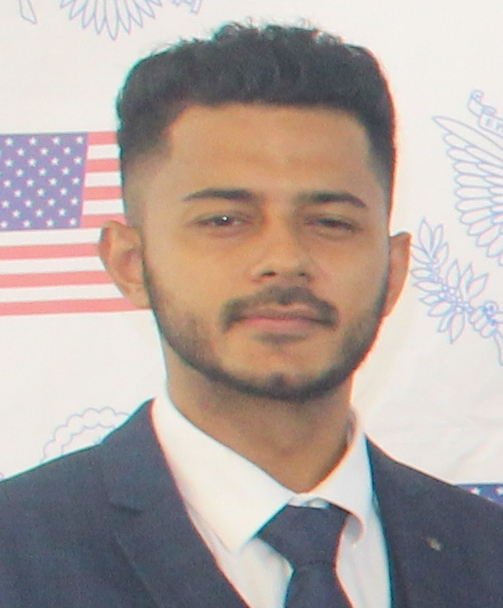
- Sharma in 2023

Member of the Fijian Parliament for the Republic of Fiji
- Incumbent
- Assumed office 14 December 2022

Personal details
- Born: 22 April 1993 (age 33) Lautoka, Fiji
- Party: FijiFirst (2022–2024); Independent (2024–present)
- Education: Natabua High School; Jawaharlal Nehru Technological University

Rinesh Rajesh Sharma (born 22 April 1993) is a Fijian entrepreneur, politician and member of the Parliament of Fiji. He became an independent politician, following the deregistration of FijiFirst in 2024.

== Early career and education ==
In 2018, Sharma graduated from Sri Venkateswara College of Engineering and Technology in India with a Bachelor of Computer Science and Engineering degree. He is originally from Lautoka. He then founded Smarts Fiji which specialises in hydroponics farming. That same year, he was able to secure a government-backed grant to begin automated hydroponics farms on a commercial scale in Fiji.

In February 2020, Sharma was nominated for the 2020 Commonwealth Youth Awards. That same year, he received funding from the Bill & Melinda Gates Foundation to combat the impacts of the COVID-19 pandemic in Fiji.

== Political career ==
Sharma was one of the candidates announced by FijiFirst for the 2022 Fijian general election. He was elected to the Parliament of Fiji with 1,705 votes. At 29, he is the youngest to be serving as a member of parliament.
