= Mikaele Leawere =

Fijian politician

Mikaele Rokosova Leawere is a Fijian politician and former member of the Parliament of Fiji. He is a member of the Social Democratic Liberal Party.

Leawere worked as a teacher, but resigned his position in order to stand for election.

Leawere contested the 2014 elections as a SODELPA candidate, but was unsuccessful. He entered parliament in April 2015 after the death of SODELPA MP Viliame Tagiveitaua, as the highest-polling unelected SODELPA candidate. A challenge to his election by the government on the grounds that he was disqualified due to working again as a public servant was dismissed. In parliament, he served as shadow minister of Education.

Leawere was re-elected in the 2018 general elections, winning 2,354 votes.
