= Semi Koroilavesau =

Fijian politician

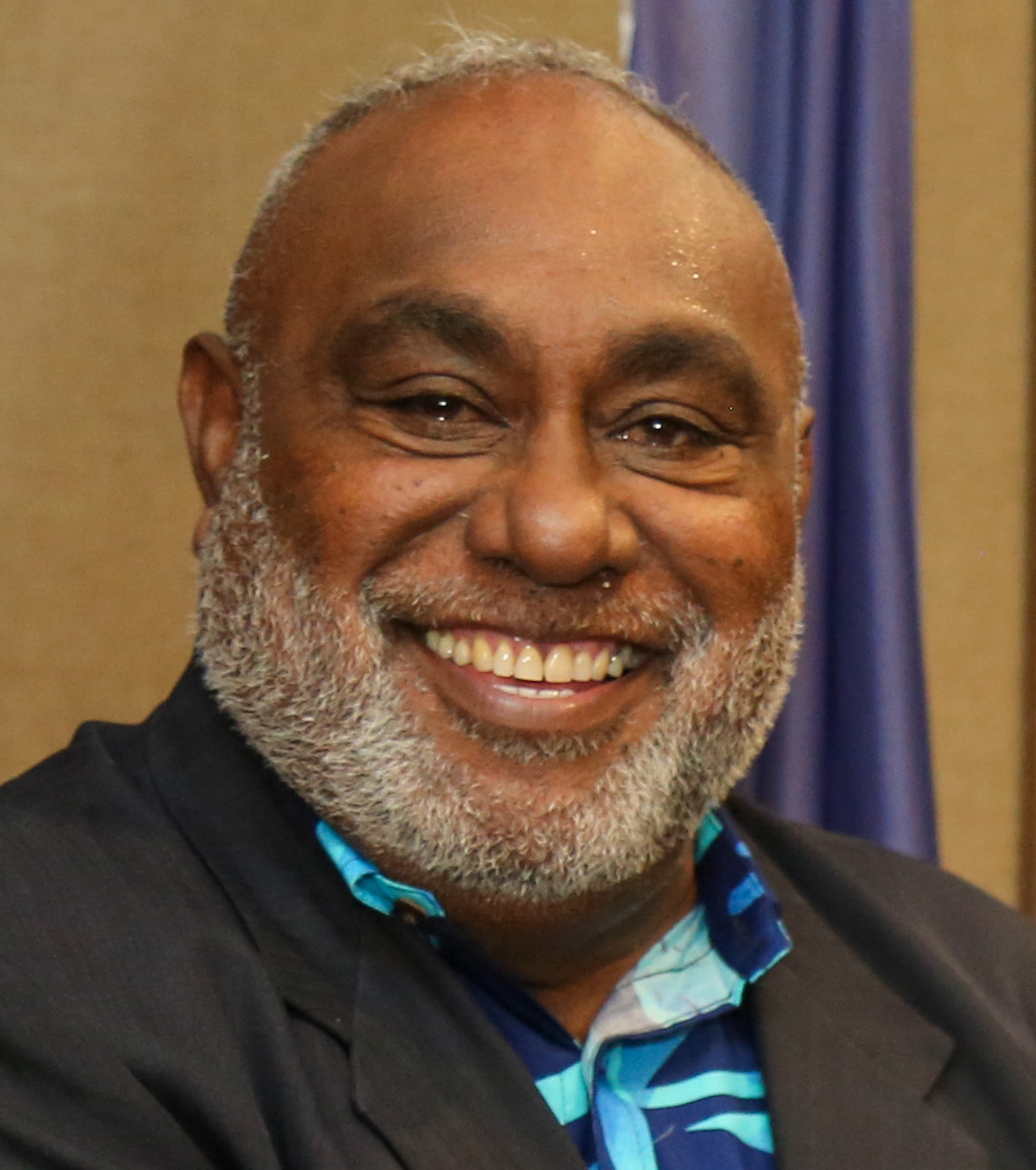
- Koroilavesau in 2022

Minister for Fisheries
- In office 21 November 2018 – 24 December 2022
- Succeeded by: Kalaveti Ravu

Minister for Employment, Productivity and Industrial Relations
- In office 16 October 2015 – 21 November 2018
- Succeeded by: Parveen Bala

Personal details
- Party: People's First
- Other political affiliations: FijiFirst (2014-2024)

Semi Tuleca Koroilavesau (born 1958) is a Fijian politician and Member of the Parliament of Fiji. He served the Minister for Fisheries from 2018 to 2022. He is a member of the FijiFirst party.

Koroilavesau grew up in Nalotu in Kadavu Province. He was educated at Yawe District primary school, Richmond High School, and Lelean Memorial School. After sixth form, he joined the Fijian Navy as an officer cadet. In his military career he reached the rank of Commander. In 1988 he started a tourism company, Captain Cook Cruises Fiji Islands with 3 partners. In 1996, the business was sold to Captain Cook Cruises,. Semi remained a partner in the Fijian business and in 2003 retired from the Navy to manage it.

Koroilavesau was elected in the 2014 election, in which he won 1,611 votes.

Following the collapse and deregistration of FijiFirst he remained in parliament as an independent.

He was one of 10 MP's who supported and helped in the creation of the People's First Party, and as of 2026 a member of that Party.
