= Alvikh Maharaj =

Fijian politician

Alvick Avhikrit Maharaj is a Fijian politician and Member of the Parliament of Fiji for the FijiFirst Party. He served as the assistant Minister for Employment, Productivity, Industrial Relations, Youth and Sport. He was re-elected to Parliament in the 2018 election. In 2022, as FijiFirst lost the election, Maharaj subsequently lost his portfolio, despite being re-elected to a 3rd term in Parliament.
