= Jovesa Vocea =

Fijian politician (died 2026)

Member of the Fijian Parliament for PA List
- In office 14 December 2022 – 18 November 2026

Personal details
- Died: 18 November 2026
- Party: People's Alliance

Jovesa Rokuta Vocea (died 18 November 2026) was a Fijian politician who was a member of the Parliament of Fiji, representing the People's Alliance.

== Life and career ==
Vocea was a civil servant. In April 2015 he was appointed Commissioner for the Northern Division. He retired as Commissioner Northern in December 2019.

He was selected as a PA candidate in the 2022 Fijian general election, and was elected to Parliament, winning 2363 votes. On 24 December 2022 he was appointed Assistant Minister for i-Taukei Affairs in the coalition government of Sitiveni Rabuka.

Vocea died after collapsing in parliament on 18 November 2026.
