= Unity Fiji =

- Abbreviation: UFP
- Leader: Savenaca Narube
- President: Adi Sivia Qoro
- General Secretary: Satish Kumar
- Founded: 6 July 2017
- Headquarters: Lot 4 Sese St, Samabula, Suva
- Ideology: Multiculturalism
- Colours: Teal
- MPs in the Parliament of Fiji: 0 / 51

Website
- unityfiji.com

Unity Fiji (UFP) is a registered political party in Fiji. It was registered as a political party in July 2017. The party's leader is Savenaca Narube, the former Governor of Reserve Bank of Fiji.

On 11 May 2018 the party announced a list of 14 candidates to contest the 2018 election. It subsequently submitted a list of 28 candidates, of which 5 were women.

The party won 6,896 votes in the 2018 election, 1.52% of the total. However, it failed to win any seats. In the 2022 the party almost doubled its vote share, up to 2.78%, but it failed again to get parliamentary representation.

== Electoral history ==
=== Parliamentary elections ===
Election	Party leader	Votes	%	Seats	+/–	Position	Government
2018	Savenaca Narube	6,896	1.52%	0 / 51	New	▲4th	Extra-parliamentary
2022	Savenaca Narube	13,100	2.78%	0 / 55	0	▼5th	Extra-parliamentary
