= Cabinet of Fiji =

Government body of Fiji

The Cabinet of Fiji is a Government body of Ministers appointed by the Prime Minister of Fiji and responsible to the Parliament of Fiji. The Cabinet's constitutional basis is sections 90 to 96 of the 2013 Constitution of Fiji.

Cabinet consists of the Prime Minister as chair and a number of Ministers. With the exception of the Attorney-General, they must be members of Parliament. Ministers hold office at the pleasure of the Prime Minister, or until they resign or cease to be MPs.

The cabinet is responsible to Parliament. Ministers must provide regular reports to Parliament on their areas of responsibility and must appear before Parliament or any committee on a request to answer questions about their areas of responsibility.

Prior to the 2006 Fijian coup d'état and the 2009 Fijian constitutional crisis, Fiji's Cabinet was governed by the 1997 Constitution. An unusual feature of the constitution was to require a compulsory coalition cabinet, with every political party with more than 8 seats in the 71-member parliament required to be offered a proportionate number of cabinet posts. The model was not successfully implemented for nearly a decade, with the governments of both Mahendra Chaudhry and Laisenia Qarase refusing to offer Cabinet seats to their political opponents. It was only after the 2006 election that a full multi-party Cabinet was appointed. The multi-party model was not continued in the 2013 constitution.

== Current cabinet ==
After the 2022 Fijian general elections:

Portfolio	Portrait	Minister	Party
Prime Minister; Foreign Affairs; Climate Change and Environment; Civil Service; Information; Public Enterprises		Sitiveni Rabuka	PA
Minister for Finance; Commerce and Business Development		Esrom Immanuel	PA
Deputy Prime Minister; Tourism; Civil Aviation		Viliame Gavoka	SODELPA
Attorney General; Justice		Siromi Turaga	PA
Defence and Veteran Affairs		Pio Tikoduadua	NFP
Employment; Productivity and Industrial Relations		Agni Deo Singh	NFP
iTaukei Affairs; Culture, Heritage and Arts		Ifereimi Vasu	SODELPA
Education		Aseri Radrodro	SODELPA
Health and Medical Services		Atonio Lalabalavu	PA
Information		Lynda Tabuya	PA
Women, Children and Social Protectcion		Sashi Kiran	NFP
Fisheries & Forests		Alitia Bainivalu	PA
Lands and Mineral Resource		Filimoni Vosarogo	PA
Rural, Maritime Development and Disaster Management		Sakiasi Ditoka	PA
Multi-Ethnic Affairs; Sugar		Charan Jeath Singh	PA
Housing; Local Government		Maciu Katamotu	PA
Public Works; Transport		Filipe Tuisawau	PA
Youth and Sports		Jese Saukuru	PA
Agriculture and Waterways		Tomasi Tunabuna	PA
Minister for Environment and Climate Change		Mosese Bulitavu	Independent
Communication; Minister for Policing		Ioane Naivalurua	Independent
Minister for Immigration		Viliame Naupoto	Independent

== List of Former Cabinets ==
=== 4th Cabinet (Bavadra 1987-1987) ===
Position	Minister
Prime Minister Minister for Public Service Minister for Fijian Affairs Minister for Home Affairs	Timoci Bavadra
Deputy Prime Minister Minister for Housing and Urban Affairs Minister for Information	Harish Sharma
Attorney General Minister for Justice	Jai Ram Reddy
Minister for Agriculture, Fisheries and Forestry	Joeli Nacola
Minister for Communications, Transport and Works	Ahmed Bhamji
Minister for Education, Youth and Sport	Tupeni Baba
Minister of Finance and Economic Planning	Mahendra Chaudhry
Minister for Foreign Affairs and Civil Aviation	Krishna Datt
Minister for Health and Social Welfare	Satendra Nandan
Minister for Labour and Immigration	Joeli Kalou
Minister for Lands, Energy and Mineral Resources	Mosese Volavola
Minister for Trade, Industry and Tourism	Navin Maharaj
Minister of State for Cooperatives and Consumer Affairs	Chris Herbert
Minister of State for Rural Development, Rehabilitation and Relief	Temo Sukanaivalu

=== 3rd Cabinet (Mara 1982-1987) ===
Position	Minister
Prime Minister	Kamisese Mara
Deputy Prime Minister Minister of Fijian Affairs and Rural Development	Penaia Ganilau
Attorney General	Manikam Pillai
Minister of Agriculture and Fisheries	Jonati Mavoa
Minister of Communications and Works	Semesa Sikivou
Minister of Economic Planning and Development	David Toganivalu
Minister of Education and Youth	Ahmed Ali
Minister of Energy and Minerals	Peter Stinson
Minister of Employment and Industrial Relations	Mohammed Ramzan
Minister of Finance	Charles Walker
Minister of Foreign Affairs Minister of Tourism	Mosese Qionibaravi
Minister of Health and Social Welfare	Apenisa Kurisaqila
Minister of Home Affairs	William Toganivalu
Minister of Lands, Local Government and Housing	Militoni Leweniqila
Minister of Transport and Civil Aviation	Ted Beddoes
Minister of State for Co-operatives	Livai Nasilivata
Minister of State for Forests	Josaia Tavaiqia
Minister without Portfolio	Apisai Tora
Source: Pacific Islands Monthly

=== 2nd Cabinet (Mara 1977-1982) ===
Position	Minister
Prime Minister Minister of Foreign Affairs	Kamisese Mara
Deputy Prime Minister Minister of Fijian Affairs and Rural Development	Penaia Ganilau
Attorney General	Vijay R. Singh
Minister of Agriculture and Fisheries	Charles Walker
Minister of Commerce, Industry and Co-operatives	Mohammed Ramzan
Minister of Education and Sport	Semesa Sikivou
Minister of Finance	Charles Stinson
Minister of Health	Ted Beddoes
Minister of Labour, Industrial Relations and Immigration	David Toganivalu
Minister of Tourism, Transport and Civil Aviation	Tomasi Vakatora
Minister of Urban Development and Housing	Jonati Mavoa
Minister of Works and Communications	James Shankar Singh
Minister of State for Co-operatives	Livai Nasilivata
Minister of State for Forests	Josaia Tavaiqia
Minister of State for Information	William Toganivalu
Minister of State for Lands and Mineral Resources	Militoni Leweniqila
Minister of State for Home Affairs	Solomone Momoivalu
Minister of State for Youth and Sport	Vivekanand Sharma

=== 1st Cabinet (Mara 1972-1977) ===
Position	Minister
Prime Minister	Kamisese Mara
Deputy Prime Minister	Edward Cakobau
Minister for Agriculture, Fisheries and Forests	Douglas Walkden-Brown
Attorney General	John Falvey
Minister for Commerce, Industries and Co-operatives	M. T. Khan
Minister for Communications, Works and Tourism	Penaia Ganilau
Minister for Education, Youth and Sport	Jone Naisara
Minister for Fijian Affairs	William Toganivalu
Minister for Finance	Charles Stinson
Minister for Health	James Shankar Singh
Minister for Labour	Jonati Mavoa
Minister for Lands, Mines and Mineral Resources	Josua Toganivalu
Minister of Urban Development, Housing and Social Welfare	Vijay R. Singh
Minister without Portfolio	George Cakobau
Source: Pacific Islands Monthly
