= 2022 Fijian general election =

- 14 December 2022

All 55 seats in Parliament 28 seats needed for a majority
- Registered: 693,915
- Turnout: 68.30% (▼3.62pp)
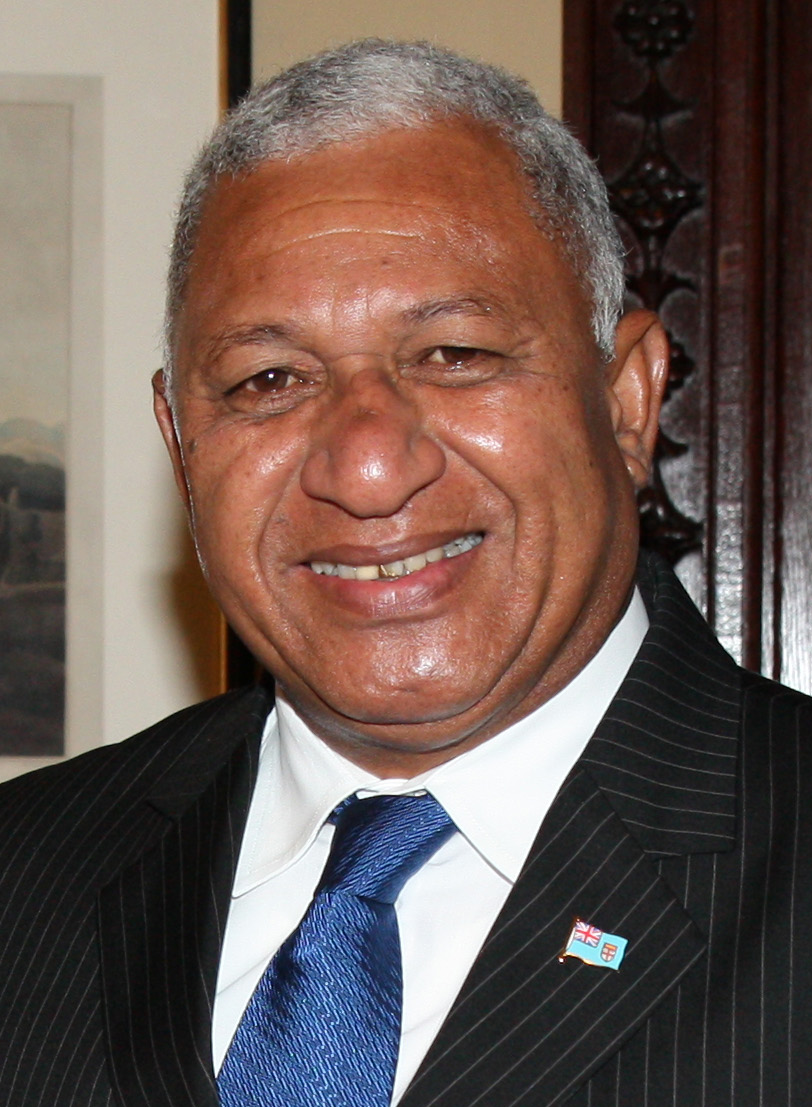

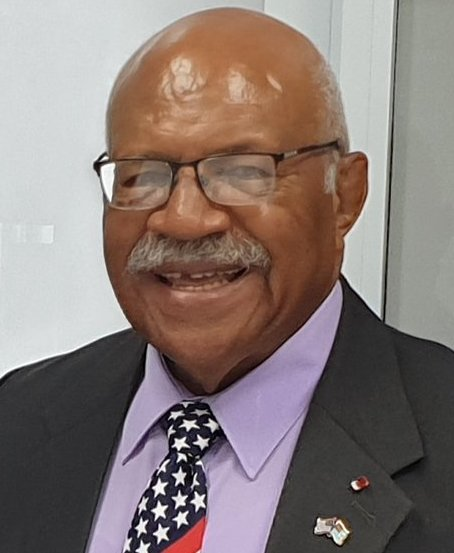

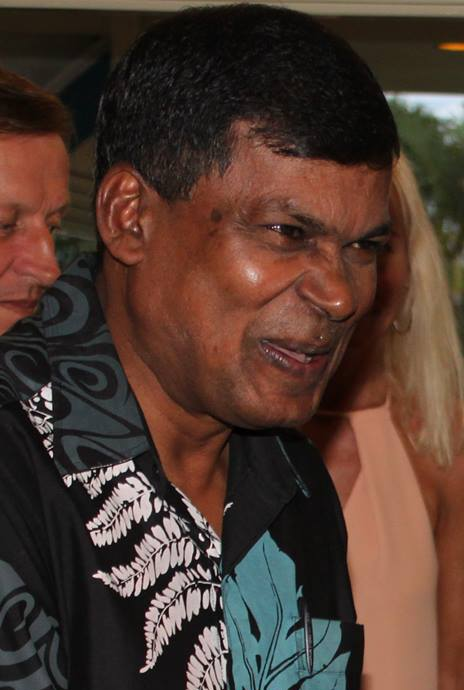

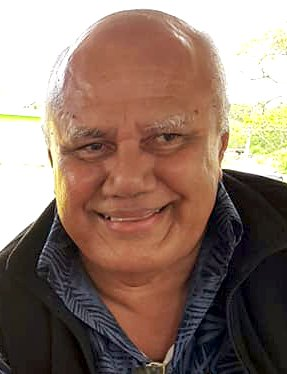
| | First party | Second party |
|---|---|---|
| Leader | Frank Bainimarama | Sitiveni Rabuka |
| Party | FijiFirst | People's Alliance |
| Last election | 50.02%, 27 seats | – |
| Seats won | 26 | 21 |
| Seat change | ▼1 | New |
| Popular vote | 200,246 | 168,581 |
| Percentage | 42.55% | 35.82% |
| Swing | ▼7.47pp | New |
| | Third party | Fourth party |
| Leader | Biman Prasad | Viliame Gavoka |
| Party | NFP | SODELPA |
| Last election | 7.38%, 3 seats | 39.85%, 21 seats |
| Seats won | 5 | 3 |
| Seat change | ▲2 | ▼18 |
| Popular vote | 41,830 | 24,172 |
| Percentage | 8.89% | 5.14% |
| Swing | ▲1.51pp | ▼34.71pp |
Prime Minister before election
Frank Bainimarama
FijiFirst
Subsequent Prime Minister
Sitiveni Rabuka
People's Alliance

General elections were held in Fiji on 14 December 2022 to elect the 55 members of Parliament. The elections took place following the passage of controversial electoral amendments.

In addition to a struggling economy, significant campaign issues included the national debt, ethnic tensions and tackling poverty. During the preliminary count, the Fijian Elections Office (FEO) app displaying the results experienced a glitch, prompting FEO to take down the app temporarily. Once the app was back in operation, the vote tally showed the ruling FijiFirst party leading, resulting in five opposition parties demanding a recount and for the counting process to cease. Observers said they had not seen any significant voting irregularities, adding that an initial anomaly with an app showing the results had been rectified.

Of the nine parties that contested the election, four passed the 5% threshold needed to enter parliament, but no party won a majority. FijiFirst won a plurality, securing 26 seats. The newly formed People's Alliance (PA) secured 21 seats, while its coalition partner, the National Federation Party (NFP), won five. The Social Democratic Liberal Party (SODELPA), which placed second in the 2018 election, retained three seats.

Negotiations to form a government began following the election, with FijiFirst and the PA-NFP coalition seeking to win over the kingmaker SODELPA. After several days, on 20 December, SODELPA's management board voted to form a coalition government with the People's Alliance and the NFP, ending the FijiFirst government's eight-year rule and Bainimarama's 16-year tenure as prime minister. The ruling FijiFirst party refused to concede the election, instead waiting for MPs to elect the new prime minister during the first session of parliament. This session, scheduled for 21 December, was delayed, as no public announcement came from the President. SODELPA's management board met for a second time on 23 December and again voted to form a government with the PA-NFP coalition.

President Katonivere called for the first parliamentary session since the election in the morning of 24 December. Naiqama Lalabalavu was elected and confirmed as Speaker by parliament garnering 28 votes of the 55 cast. Sitiveni Rabuka was elected and confirmed as prime minister by parliament on the same day garnering 28 votes of the 55 cast, officially ending Frank Bainimarama's 16-year tenure as prime minister and cementing the PA-NFP-SODELPA government. Bainimarama then conceded defeat peacefully.

== Background ==
Frank Bainimarama became prime minister in 2007 after leading the 2006 coup d'état. Bainimarama founded the FijiFirst party in 2014 and was acting prime minister until his party's victory in the general election that year. The 2018 general election resulted in FijiFirst losing five seats but retaining its parliamentary majority and remaining in office as a majority government. SODELPA, which gained six seats, continued as the opposition, while the NFP retained its three seats.

SODELPA's governing board elected Viliame Gavoka to lead the party in November 2020, replacing former prime minister Sitiveni Rabuka. Rabuka conceded to Gavoka and pledged to remain affiliated with the party. In December of that year, he resigned as opposition leader and from parliament. Rabuka later left SODELPA and founded the People's Alliance party in August 2021, which was registered the following month.

In addition to the People's Alliance, the election supervisor approved the registration of three new parties in 2022; the All Peoples Party, led by Tuloma Tutani Tawaivuna, the New Generation Party, led by Fredrick Kataiwai, and the We Unite Fiji Party, led by Jolame Vosailagi.

On 30 October 2022, Prime Minister Frank Bainimarama announced, when he visited President Wiliame Katonivere, that elections would be held on 14 December 2022. He also advised the President to dissolve parliament. The President subsequently issued the writ of election to the Electoral Commission in accordance with section 59(1) of the constitution.

== Electoral system ==
Members of the Parliament of Fiji are elected from a single nationwide constituency by open list proportional representation with an electoral threshold of 5%. Seats are allocated using the d'Hondt method.

Political parties registered in accordance with the Political Parties Act 2013 can nominate party candidates to contest the general election. The total number of party candidates must not be more than the total number of seats in Parliament. Independent candidates can also contest the general election.

=== Voters ===
All citizens aged 18 and older are eligible to vote. Voting is not mandatory, and upon registering, voters receive a 'VoterCard'. Voters may choose their preferred polling location when enrolling but are only permitted to cast their ballot at their chosen venue. Residents of remote regions, including the highlands and the outer islands, cast their ballots during the week before the election. Polling staff provide help for illiterate voters, while disabled electors have the option to receive assistance from an enrolled voter. The registration process for citizens remains open until the day when the president issues the election writ. Voters unable to travel to their polling station on election day may cast a postal vote in advance. Fijians residing abroad, along with residents who will not be present in Fiji on election day, are permitted to vote in this manner. Postal voting is also open to individuals who have a severe illness, have employment obligations, those citing religious beliefs and detained individuals.

=== Electoral changes ===
Fiji's Parliament gained an additional four seats in the 2022 general election. Fijian Electoral Commission chairman Suresh Chandra said the increase of seats from 51 to 55 was in accordance with section 54 of the Constitution.

Parliament passed an electoral amendment in 2021 that only allowed voters to register on the electoral roll using their birth names. Attorney-General Aiyaz Sayed-Khaiyum claimed the bill was vital to assist the Fijian Elections Office (FEO) when identifying deceased voters to remove from the electoral roll and confirming voters' citizenship. However, professor Jon Fraenkel of Victoria University, warned the amendment would risk disenfranchising voters, particularly married women who have adopted their spouse's surname.

On 2 September 2022, parliament passed a controversial amendment that would increase the power of the elections supervisor, permitting them to obtain documents on any citizens for any reason. The bill sparked criticism from the Fiji Law Society (FLS) and opposition parties, including SODELPA and the NFP. The FLS president warned the amendment would only permit citizens to appeal decisions carried out by the elections supervisor with the electoral commission and would undermine citizens' privacy and legal professional privilege. NFP leader Biman Prasad said the powers the bill grants made the elections supervisor "almost like a god" and had demanded the bill's withdrawal. Attorney-General Sayed-Khaiyum, who introduced the bill to parliament, blasted the opposition for allegedly not raising concerns when similar measures were included in different acts in the past. Election supervisor Mohammed Saneem's reportedly hostile relations with the opposition have been a source of widespread concern that the government's motive behind the expansion of Saneem's powers was to disadvantage the opposition parties.

== Schedule ==
The schedule for the election was:

| Date | Event |
|---|---|
| 30 October 2022 (Sunday) | Prime Minister Frank Bainimarama announces elections to be held on 14 December 2022. |
| 30 October 2022 (Sunday) | President Wiliame Katonivere subsequently dissolves the Parliament. |
| 31 October 2022 (Monday) | President Wiliame Katonivere issues the writ of election to the Electoral Commission. |
| 1 November 2022 (Tuesday) | Nominations of candidates opens. |
| 14 November 2022 (Monday) | Nomination of candidates closes. |
| 23 November 2022 (Wednesday) | Postal voting application closes. |
| 5 December 2022 (Monday) | Pre-poll voting begins. |
| 9 December 2022 (Friday) | Pre-poll voting ends. |
| 12 December 2022 (Monday) | Media blackout commences at 7.30 a.m for 48 hours prior to election day. |
| 14 December 2022 (Wednesday) | Election day – polling places open from 7.30 a.m. to 6 p.m. |
| 17 December 2022 (Saturday) | Final election results released. |

== Parties ==
A total of 342 candidates from nine political parties, plus two independent candidates, contested the general election. 56 of the total candidates were women.

| Party | Leader | Candidates | 2018 seats |
|---|---|---|---|
| FijiFirst | Frank Bainimarama | 55 | 27 / 51 |
| Social Democratic Liberal Party | Viliame Gavoka | 54 | 21 / 51 |
| National Federation Party | Biman Prasad | 54 | 3 / 51 |
| Unity Fiji | Savenaca Narube | 38 | 0 / 51 |
| Fiji Labour Party | Mahendra Chaudhry | 42 | 0 / 51 |
| People's Alliance | Sitiveni Rabuka | 55 | Not yet founded |
| We Unite Fiji Party | Ruveni Nadalo | 20 | Not yet founded |
| New Generation Party | Varinava Tiko | 5 | Not yet founded |
| All Peoples Party | Tuiloma Tawaivuna | 14 | Not yet founded |
| Independents | —N/a | 2 | 0 / 51 |

== Campaign ==
On 17 March 2022 the Electoral Commission announced that the campaign period would begin on 26 April 2022 and conclude two days prior to election day. Major issues among voters include ethnic tensions between the indigenous Fijians and Indo-Fijians and poverty. Other significant issues are the national debt, which in 2022 accounted for 80% of the country's GDP and a struggling economy. The FijiFirst government blamed the COVID-19 pandemic for the economic slump, while the opposition argued the economy was in a dire state beforehand. The prevention of further coup d'états was a key priority among voters, of which the country has suffered four since independence. On 6 December, major-general Jone Kalouniwai announced the military would respect the election results regardless of who the victors were.

=== FijiFirst ===
The ruling FijiFirst party, in power since 2014, was led into the election by prime minister Frank Bainimarama. Bainimarama rarely presents unscripted speeches in public. Attorney-General Sayed-Khaiyum, who frequently appears in public, is perceived by many voters and political commentators as the party's primary figure. The party highlighted its record in government and focused on job creation, particularly for the youth, and sought to increase spending for the tourism industry and environmental conservation. Bainimarama aimed to become Fiji's longest-serving prime minister. On 16 November, the FijiFirst party held its campaign rally in Nausori with party general secretary Sayed-Khaiyum urging supporters to vote for Bainimarama. Another rally was held on 5 December with President of SODELPA Manoa Roragaca present, wearing a FijiFirst merchandise.

=== SODELPA ===
SODEPLA released its manifesto in September 2022. Led by Viliame Gavoka, the party's platform included indigenous affairs, health and education. The party also pledged to increase the budget for the agricultural sector from FJ$64 million to FJ$225 million and to raise spending for the iTaukei (indigenous) affairs ministry to FJ$159 million. The party leader also declared his intention to implement debt forgiveness for students. Gavoka ruled out entering a coalition with the People's Alliance and the NFP, partly due to his refusal to cooperate with Prasad or Rabuka. He was confident that SODELPA would win an outright victory. The party declined to ally with the Unity Fiji Party and FijiFirst, although Gavoka remained open to working with the former should they need to form a coalition government. Former opposition whip Felipe Tuisawau slammed SODELPA for including three former soldiers who participated in the 2006 coup d'état on the party list.

=== People's Alliance ===
The People's Alliance party led by former Prime Minister Sitiveni Rabuka promised to set up a Truth and Reconciliation Commission to "heal the pains and scars" caused by previous coups. Rabuka executed the 1987 coups d'état, the second of which overthrew the government of Prime Minister Timoci Bavadra. However, he assured voters, "what you saw of Rabuka in 1987 is totally different of Rabuka post-1997." The party promised to remove FICAC which is the country's anti-corruption agency and restore local government elections within 100 days if elected. Rabuka proclaimed that an NFP-PA coalition government would forgive student debt and improve government relations with the regional University of the South Pacific (USP). He also criticised Sayed-Khaiyum for attempting to "repress" the university. Rabuka said he favours close ties with Australia and supported western-style democracy, adding that Fiji will pivot away from Chinese influence under his leadership.

On 6 December, deputy leaders of the People's Alliance party, Lynda Tabuya and Dan Lobendahn were both charged with vote buying and for breaching campaign rules. Rabuka condemned the arrests calling it an attempt to hinder their election campaign.

=== NFP ===
The National Federation Party (NFP), the oldest party to contest, was led into the election by professor Biman Prasad. Allied with the People's Alliance, the NFP's manifesto focused on decreasing government wastage and improving the management of spending. If victorious, the NFP pledged to conduct an audit of the economy within the first 100 days. The party promised to "immediately slash ministerial salaries and allowances by one-third". The NFP also pledged to repeal the iTaukei Land Trust Act of 2021 and "begin work on national consultations on health, education, poverty and the economy".

In November 2022, the party announced its second batch of proposed candidates with one from the LGBT community, the country's first ever transgender candidate to contest the election. The announcement was met with attacks from the conservative and religious All People's Party. The announcement also prompted a misinformation campaign on social media that the party supported same-sex marriage. In response, NFP President Pio Tikoduadua said "the NFP has not, is not and will never support same sex marriage" adding that it is unlawful.

=== FLP ===
Former prime minister Mahendra Chaudhry, who governed from 1999 until his overthrow in the 2000 coup d'état, led the Fiji Labour Party (FLP) into the election. The FLP's platform focused primarily on economic growth, including agricultural development and paying down the national debt, to prevent Fiji from ending up in an economic crisis like Sri Lanka. The party also promised to strengthen Fiji's sugar industry and establish a ministry of infrastructure. In November 2022, FLP vice-president Monica Raghwan announced her party was willing to ally with any other contesting parties except FijiFirst. She claimed no parties intended to form a coalition with FijiFirst, and insisted that voters desired "a change".

=== All People's ===
A newly formed party led by Pastor Tuiloma Tawaivuna, the party has been described as advocating theocracy by FBC News due to its radical policies such as leaving the United Nations and joining the Commonwealth of Israel instead and mandating all businesses to give up a tenth of their wealth as tithe. The party also promised to restore corporal punishment and release prisoners who are serving life imprisonment to commemorate the country's 50th anniversary of Independence.

On 4 December, party leader Tawaivuna in a video shared on social media called on NFP leader Biman Prasad to remove transgender candidate Divina Loloma from contesting the election, adding it is an abomination and biblically wrong to imitate the opposite sex. The party leader also slammed others who were advocating for the gay rights movement in the country.

== Opinion polls ==
=== Preferred prime minister ===
Graphical summary of opinion polls for preferred Prime Minister.

| Pollster | Date | Sample size | Bainimarama | Rabuka | Prasad | Gavoka | Narube | Chaudhry |
|---|---|---|---|---|---|---|---|---|
| Fiji Sun, Western Force Research | 1 September 2021 | 1,000 | 32.2% | 35.9% | 7.6% | 15.3% | 4.7% | 2.9% |
| Fiji Sun | 30 October 2021 | 1,000 | 35.2% | 36.1% | 7.2% | 12.3% | 8.5% | 0.7% |
| Fiji Sun, Western Force Research | 3 March 2022 | 754 | 21.8% | 40.7% | 12.3% | 8.4% | 13.2% | 3.6% |

=== Voting intention ===
Graphical summary of opinion polls for voting intention.

| Pollster(s) | Date | Sample size | FijiFirst | PA | NFP | SODELPA | Unity | Labour | Lead |
|---|---|---|---|---|---|---|---|---|---|
| Fiji Sun, Western Force Research | 1 Sep 2021 | 1,000 | 32.2% | 35.9% | 7.6% | 15.3% | 4.7% | 2.9% | +3.7% |
| Fiji Sun | 30 Oct 2021 | 1,000 | 35.2% | 36.1% | 7.2% | 12.3% | 8.5% | 0.7% | +0.9% |

=== Forecast ===
Below is the election forecast, calculated using the results of opinion polls for voting intention. This is not the actual number of seats won at the election.

| Date | Source | Seat calculation | | | | | Likely government formation(s) |
| Date | Source | FijiFirst | PA | NFP | SODELPA | Unity | Likely government formation(s) |
|---|---|---|---|---|---|---|---|
| 1 September 2021 | Fiji Sun, Western Force Research | 20 | 22 | 4 | 9 | 0 | People's Alliance + SODELPA |
| 30 October 2021 | Fiji Sun | 20 | 20 | 4 | 7 | 4 | Hung parliament |

== Debates ==
A youth debate was held on 6 December moderated by Vijay Narayan from FijiVillage. A women's debate was held on 8 December also moderated by FijiVillage. The leader's debate was held on 11 December.

Table of debates
| Date | Organiser(s) | Subject | Participants | | | | | | | | |
| Date | Organiser(s) | Subject | FijiFirst | SODELPA | NFP | UFP | FLP | PAP | WUFP | NGP | APP |
|---|---|---|---|---|---|---|---|---|---|---|---|
| 6 December | FijiVillage | Youth debate | Absent | Present Tikoilomaloma | Present Vatuniveivuke | Present Matanisiga | Present Nasilivata | Present Gavidi | Present Sharma | Not invited | Not invited |
| 8 December | FijiVillage | Women's debate | Absent | Present Rokomokoti | Present Qereqeretabua | Present Bulivou | Present Rokotabua | Present Tabuya | Not invited | Not invited | Not invited |
| 11 December | FijiVillage | Leaders' debate | Absent | Present Gavoka | Present Prasad | Present Narube | Present Chaudhry | Present Rabuka | Not invited | Not invited | Not invited |

== Conduct ==
Pre-polling commenced on 6 December and was scheduled to conclude on 9 December. Election supervisor Saneem announced on 8 December that the elections office would provide free transport for voters. The elections office announced 97 observers from 16 countries, including two regional organisations, would be present to monitor the electoral process. On 12 December, the media blackout commenced, requiring candidates to remove all campaign material visible in public areas; the blackout was scheduled to conclude once polling stations had closed on election day. On 13 December, the elections office announced changes to 16 polling venues around the country due to "force majeure reasons". One of the polling venues was a primary school in Suva which was destroyed in a fire on 12 December; investigation reveals that the fire was arson-related.

On election day, voting commenced at 7:30 am local time (UTC+12:00). Some voters had trouble finding the correct queue at polling stations, with several claiming the instructions lacked clarity. In response, election supervisor Saneem assured voters they could opt to message their voter card to the polling staff and receive essential information. He said all polling stations throughout the country were fully functioning by 9 am. Voting concluded at 6 pm; however, individuals who had not voted but had been waiting at polling stations before 6 pm were allowed to cast their ballots. More than a thousand police officers were deployed around the country to assist the elections office in its operations as well as ensuring security for the country's counting and results centre. The NFP brought up several issues with the FEO that allegedly occurred during the electoral process, including the presence of FijiFirst advertisements in public areas during the media blackout and election officials interfering with voters.

Election observers said they had not seen any significant voting irregularities, adding that an initial anomaly with an app showing the results had been rectified.

== Results ==
Counting began at polling places across the country after polls closed at 6:00 pm local time on 14 December. Provisional results were gradually released until 7:00 am the next day. Official results were gradually released and updated on the results app.

The final results which was released on 18 December showed no party able to secure a parliamentary majority, leading to the possibility of Fiji having a coalition government for the first time since the 2013 constitution came into effect. FijiFirst won a plurality of 26 seats, the People's Alliance gained 21, the NFP's share increased to five, and only three SODELPA members were elected.

| Party | Votes | % | +/– | Seats | +/– |
|---|---|---|---|---|---|
| FijiFirst | 200,246 | 42.55 | −7.47 | 26 | −1 |
| People's Alliance | 168,581 | 35.82 | +35.82 | 21 | New |
| National Federation Party | 41,830 | 8.89 | +1.51 | 5 | +2 |
| Social Democratic Liberal Party | 24,172 | 5.14 | −34.71 | 3 | −18 |
| Unity Fiji | 13,100 | 2.78 | +1.26 | 0 | 0 |
| Fiji Labour Party | 12,704 | 2.70 | +2.08 | 0 | 0 |
| We Unite Fiji Party | 6,070 | 1.29 | +1.29 | 0 | New |
| All Peoples Party | 2,638 | 0.56 | +0.56 | 0 | New |
| New Generation Party | 964 | 0.20 | +0.20 | 0 | New |
| Independents | 279 | 0.06 | +0.06 | 0 | 0 |
| Total | 470,584 | 100.00 | – | 55 | +4 |
| Valid votes | 470,584 | 99.30 | +0.22 | | |
| Invalid/blank votes | 3,326 | 0.70 | –0.22 | | |
| Total votes | 473,910 | 100.00 | – | | |
| Registered voters/turnout | 693,915 | 68.30 | –3.62 | | |
Source: FEO

=== Elected members ===
The following candidates were elected:

| FijiFirst | People's Alliance | NFP | SODELPA |
| Frank Bainimarama; Aiyaz Sayed-Khaiyum; Parveen Bala; Mahendra Reddy; Hem Chand; Josaia Bulavakarua Niudamu; Rinesh Sharma; Alvikh Maharaj; Rosy Akbar; Vijay Nath; Ioane Naivalurua; Inia Seruiratu; Shalen Kumar; Faiyaz Koya; Premila Kumar; Jone Usamate; Viam Pillay; Sanjay Kirpal; Joseph Nand; Semi Koroilavesau; Ifereimi Waqainabete; Viliame Naupoto; Aliki Bia; Naisa Tatau Tuinaceva; Mosese Bulitavu; Ketan Kirit Lal | Sitiveni Rabuka; Lynda Tabuya; Charan Jeath Singh; Filimoni Vosarogo; Manoa Kamikamica; Isikeli Tuiwailevu; Iliesa Vanawalu; Siromi Turaga; Atonio Lalabalavu; Jese Saukuru; Rakuita Solesole Vakalalabure; Maciu Katamotu; Jovesa Vocea; Sakiusa Tubuna; Vatimi Rayalu; Filipe Tuisawau; Tomasi Tunabuna; Sakiasi Ditoka; Esrom Immanuel; Kalaveti Ravu; Alitia Bainivalu | Biman Prasad; Lenora Qereqeretabua; Agni Deo Singh; Pio Tikoduadua; Sashi Kiran | Viliame Gavoka; Ifereimi Vasu; Aseri Radrodro |

== Government formation ==
Final results showed that no party or known coalition were able to secure more than 50% of the votes to form a government. The Social Democratic Liberal Party which won only 3 seats became the kingmaker. On 17 December, the party set up a negotiating team and discussions were held with the two leading parties; FijiFirst and the People's Alliance. The next day, the 'kingmaker' party announced its list of non-negotiable terms which included bringing back the Great Council of Chiefs, providing free tertiary education, forgiving student loans, and establishing an embassy in Jerusalem. SODELPA's youth wing demanded the party not form a government with FijiFirst. They also urged the party leadership to reconcile differences with Rabuka to bring Bainimarama's 16-year "dictatorial rule" to an end.

On 19 December, SODELPA's management board met to discuss and decide the party they would form a coalition with. FijiVillage reported that some senior members of the management board pushed for a coalition with FijiFirst while others were against it. Ultimately, no decision was made and the party's negotiating team was sent back to the two leading parties to further review some aspects of their offer. A leaked letter from 18 December revealed that FijiFirst was offering ministerial portfolios to all three SODELPA members of parliament, but that SODELPA was intending to gain the post of deputy prime minister.

On 20 December, delegations from the two leading parties met with SODELPA's management board. Negotiations concluded and SODELPA announced the formation of a coalition government with the People's Alliance and its coalition partner, the National Federation Party, effectively ending FijiFirst's eight-year tenure and Bainimarama's 16-year premiership. The management board which consisted of 30 members voted in a secret ballot; 16 voted in favour of the opposition coalition while 14 voted for FijiFirst. The new coalition selected People's Alliance leader Sitiveni Rabuka as prime minister designate.

After the announcement, SODELPA's general secretary Duru resigned, claiming there was irregularities in the management board's vote and demanded that the result be declared null and void. He also wrote a letter to President Wiliame Katonivere to postpone the sitting of parliament until "issues were solved". Ultimately, the parliament sitting scheduled for 21 December was delayed as no announcement came from the President. On 21 December, the FijiFirst party refused to concede defeat; general secretary Aiyaz Sayed-Khaiyum said it can only be called after the election of the prime minister by parliament. He also questioned the validity of the new coalition citing concerns raised previously by SODELPA's outgoing general secretary and called Rabuka divisive. Sitiveni Rabuka said the verbal attacks on him by Sayed-Khaiyum were personal and he would follow whatever legal recourse he had to exercise his right as a citizen of this country while Biman Prasad said Sayed-Khaiyum was a bad loser for refusing to concede and was inciting hate and violence. People's Alliance later filed a police complaint.

Following communications between the elections supervisor and SODELPA's general secretary, the elections office announced that the decision made by the management board on 20 December was null and void. Some board members whose terms had expired were part of the meeting. As a result, another board meeting was held on 23 December and this time, 13 members voted for the opposition coalition while 12 voted for FijiFirst. The party's outgoing leader, Viliame Gavoka, said "Democracy had won; We went into it fully committed to ensuring that we have the best for this country. We believe and we have agreed on a way forward that benefits this country going forward."

National Federation Party leader Biman Prasad confirmed the president would call parliament to sit on 24 December, where coalition lawmakers would vote for Rabuka to become prime minister. He told reporters; "We believe that the people of this country are united. They want to move on," dismissing Bainimarama's claims of ethnic tensions. Prasad pledged the new government would support a free media and free speech. He added; "We want to create a new style of politics, a new style of governance, where we want to be inclusive." At a press conference on the same day, Rabuka said he was grateful for SODELPA's decision, which would be a "turning point in Fiji's modern history", adding he supported "western-style democracy for Fiji".

President Katonivere called for the first parliamentary session in the morning of 24 December. Naiqama Lalabalavu was elected and confirmed as Speaker by parliament garnering 28 votes of the 55 cast. Sitiveni Rabuka was elected and confirmed as prime minister by parliament on the same day garnering 28 votes of the 55 cast, officially ending Frank Bainimarama's 16-year tenure as prime minister. Bainimarama conceded defeat peacefully, and spoke to reporters; "I want to thank the supporters of FijiFirst. We still are the biggest political party in there, so I want to thank them for that. This is democracy, and this is my legacy, the 2013 Constitution," he said. Celebrations were reported to have erupted in the capital after the confirmation of a new government.

== Aftermath ==
=== Election night controversy ===
Amidst the counting on election night, the elections office took down the FEO app as one candidate was shown to have received more than fifteen thousand votes when they in fact had only earned 63 votes. Elections supervisor Saneem apologised and said they had detected an anomaly on the results app and will fix the issue. When the app came back online, provisional results showed that the ruling FijiFirst party had overtaken the People's Alliance with other parties trailing behind. As a result, party leaders of five opposition parties demanded a recount and called for an immediate halt in the counting of votes. The party leaders also added that they would not accept the outcome of the results if there was no independent oversight of a recount. The party leaders also called on the country's military forces (RFMF) to intervene in the election process. Commander of the RFMF Major-general Jone Kalouniwai rejected the request, calling it unconstitutional. Rabuka was questioned by Fijian police in relation to his letter asking the army to intervene in the election process after he alleged irregularities. Election observers said they had not seen any significant voting irregularities, adding that an initial anomaly with an app showing the results had been rectified.

=== SODELPA leadership ===
Gavoka ceased to be party leader shortly after the election. According to SODELPA's constitution, the leadership position becomes vacant if the party fails to win a parliamentary majority, requiring SODELPA to select a replacement. The party's general secretary, Lenaitasi Duru, said SODELPA would not elect a new leader until the party's 2024 annual general meeting.

=== Military deployment ===
On 21 December, the Fiji Police Force received reports of harassment and stoning incidents targeting homes and businesses of Indo-Fijians. Prime Minister and FijiFirst leader Frank Bainimarama labelled the reports "highly disturbing" and said the attacks were "fuelled by racist vitriol on social media". The opposition parties disputed the reports and called for evidence. Opposition parties also accused Bainimarama and his allies of stoking fears of ethnic trouble as a pretext to cling to power. On 22 December, the country's military forces (RFMF) was mobilised. Police Commissioner Sitiveni Qiliho announced it was a joint decision by Bainimarama, the defence minister and the military commander, to assist the police in maintaining law and order "amidst growing concerns of racial tension". The claims were rubbished by Mahendra Chaudhry, the country's first Indo-Fijian prime minister, who was overthrown in a 2000 coup "I see no evidence of unrest here, people are calm and they are waiting for the president to convene parliament so that a prime minister is elected," he said.

The next day, deputy police commissioner and chief of operations Abdul Khan resigned as he did not see the need for the country's military to be mobilised. Observers pointed out many Fijians feared the government's claims of ethnic violence and the military deployment as a pretext for a "creeping coup". Rabuka condemned the government for alleging that levels of racism have heightened after the election. He said top government officials were "sowing fear and chaos" and "trying to set the nation alight along racial lines". Reuters added although the military had been called in to assist police in maintaining law and order, the country has remained peaceful. Commander of the RFMF Major-general Kalouniwai responded the deployment would not change anything, and said; "the police were still in control and the military would respect whatever the outcome is."

== Reactions ==
=== Domestic relations ===
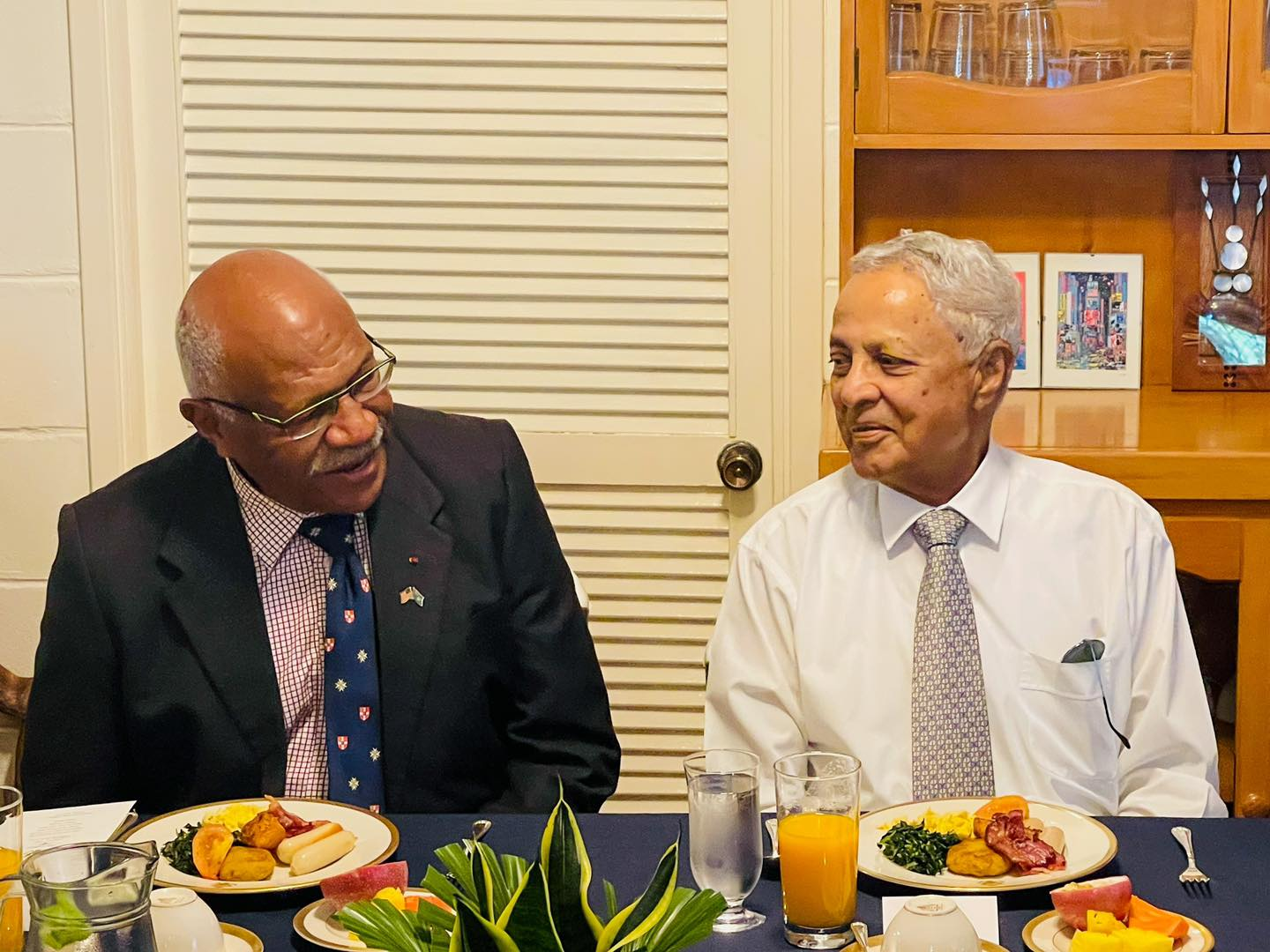
Rabuka (left) and Chaudhry (right) attending a dinner prior to the election.

Fiji Labour Party leader Mahendra Chaudhry congratulated the formation of a new government. Chaudhry also stated that the FijiFirst party may have conducted electoral fraud.

=== International reactions ===
- Australia: Prime Minister Anthony Albanese said that he was "look[ing] forward to working with the elected government" in Fiji. The Prime Minister also assured his government would support Fiji amid political turmoil. Albanese later also congratulated Rabuka for his victory.
- India: Prime Minister Narendra Modi congratulated Rabuka for his victory.
- New Zealand: Foreign Minister Nanaia Mahuta congratulated Rabuka, saying that New Zealand "looks forward to working together to continue strengthening our warm relationship". Prime Minister Jacinda Ardern assured her government would support Fiji amid political turmoil. Ardern later also congratulated Rabuka for his victory and acknowledged Bainimarama's legacy.
- Pacific Islands Forum: Secretary-General Henry Puna congratulated Rabuka and the people of Fiji "for the peaceful observance of its democratic and constitutional processes".
- Tuvalu: Foreign Minister Simon Kofe congratulated Rabuka and the newly elected speaker and deputy speaker.
- United States: President Joe Biden congratulated Rabuka for his victory.
