= Viam Pillay =

Fijian politician

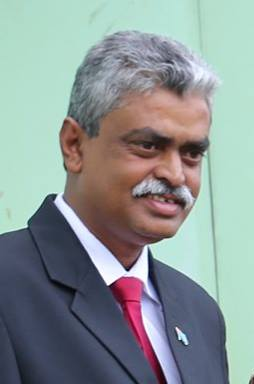
Viam Pillay

Viam Pillay is a Fijian politician who served as the Assistant Minister for Agriculture of Fiji from 2017 to 2022.
