= Sanjay Kirpal =

Fijian politician

Sanjay Kirpal is a Fijian politician and Member of the Parliament of Fiji for the FijiFirst Party. He was elected to Parliament in the 2018 election. He is a registered Valuer by profession and has a valuation company named Professional Valuations Limited. He has worked for Ministry of Lands and also attained degree in Bachelor of Arts in Land Management and Development.
