= Parveen Bala =

Deputy Leader of the Opposition of the republic of Fiji since 2024

The Honourable Parveen Bala MP
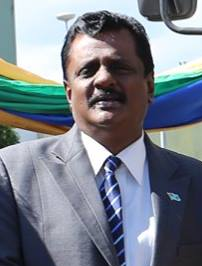
- Bala in May 2016

Deputy Leader of the Opposition
- Incumbent
- Assumed office 10 October 2024
- Leader: Inia Seruiratu

Minister for Employment, Productivity, Industrial Relations, Youth and Sports
- In office 21 November 2018 – 24 December 2022
- Prime Minister: Frank Bainimarama
- Preceded by: Laisenia Tuitubou
- Succeeded by: Agni Deo Singh

Minister of Infrastructure and Transport
- In office 12 May 2015 – 21 November 2018
- Preceded by: Pio Tikoduadua
- Succeeded by: Jone Usamate

Minister for Local Government, Housing and Environment
- In office 23 September 2014 – 21 November 2018
- Succeeded by: Premila Kumar (local govt and housing); Mahendra Reddy (environment)

Mayor of Ba
- In office 1996–2009
- Succeeded by: None (position disestablished)

Member of the Fijian Parliament for FijiFirst List
- Incumbent
- Assumed office 17 September 2014

Personal details
- Party: People's First
- Other political affiliations: National Federation Party; FijiFirst (2014–2024)

Parveen Kumar Bala is a Fijian politician and former Cabinet Minister. He served as Mayor of Ba from 1997 to 2009, and in the Cabinet of Frank Bainimarama from 2014 to 2022. He is a former president of the Fiji Local Government Association.

== Local government ==
Bala was first elected Mayor of Ba in 1997, becoming the youngest mayor in the country. He held the position for 12 years, until the military regime disestablished elected local government following the 2006 Fijian coup d'état.

Bala was also an unsuccessful National Federation Party candidate for the House of Representatives in the 2001 election. He polled 28 percent of the vote in the Ba East Indian Communal Constituency. He stood again at the 2006 election, but again failed to win the seat.

Following the 2006 Fijian coup d'état, Bala was appointed Special Administrator of Lautoka. The new Special Administrator for Ba (a non-elected position roughly analogous to mayor) is Arun Pravad.

== Member of Parliament ==
On November 2013, he was charged with dangerous driving causing death after a road accident in Lautoka. The trial was delayed, and despite facing charges he was selected as a candidate for the FijiFirst party in the 2014 Fijian general election and was ruled eligible to stand by Supervisor of Elections Mohammed Saneem. He was elected with 6,358 votes. He was acquitted of the charge in July 2016.

Following the election he was appointed Minister for Local Government, Housing and Environment. In May 2015 he was appointed Minister of Infrastructure and Transport following the resignation of Pio Tikoduadua. As a Minister he promised to restore local government elections, but failed to do so.

He was re-elected in the 2018 Fijian general election with 5,063 votes. He was subsequently appointed Minister for Employment, Productivity and Industrial Relations, replacing Jone Usamate.

He was selected again as a FijiFirst candidate for the 2022 Fijian general election, and was re-elected, winning 3604 votes, but FijiFirst lost its majority, and he became an opposition MP.

On 10 October 2024, Bala had been named deputy leader for the G16 faction.

Parveen Bala was one of 10 who supported and helped the creation of the People'a First Party, a Party he is now a member of.
