= Joseph Nand =

Fijian politician

Joseph Nitya Nand is a Fijian politician and Member of the Parliament of Fiji for the FijiFirst Party. He served as the assistant Minister for Education, Heritage and Arts. He was elected to Parliament in the 2018 election.
