= Jese Saukuru =

Fijian politician

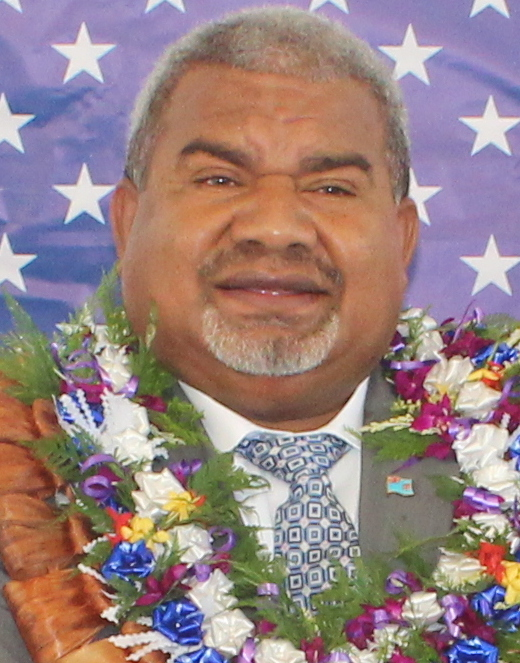
- Jese Saukuru in 2023

Minister for Youths and Sports
- Incumbent
- Assumed office 24 December 2022
- Prime Minister: Sitiveni Rabuka
- Preceded by: Parveen Bala

Member of the Fijian Parliament for PA List
- Incumbent
- Assumed office 14 December 2022

Member of the Fijian Parliament for SODELPA List
- In office 14 November 2018 – 14 December 2022

Personal details
- Party: Social Democratic Liberal Party; People's Alliance

Jese Saukuru is a Fijian politician, and Cabinet Minister. He is a member of the People's Alliance.

Saukuru is from Naviyago village in Lautoka. Before entering politics he was a manager for Ba Provincial Holdings.

He was elected to the Parliament of Fiji as a SODELPA MP in the 2018 Fijian general election and appointed spokesperson for regional development and disaster management. He made his first speech in parliament on 29 November 2018.

In November 2022 once parliament had been dissolved for the 2022 election he resigned from SODELPA and joined the People's Alliance. He contested the election as a PA candidate and was elected with 2759 votes. On 24 December 2022 he was appointed Minister for Youths and Sports in the coalition government of Sitiveni Rabuka.
