= Minister for Foreign Affairs (Fiji) =

Head of the Fijian Ministry of Foreign Affairs

Minister of Foreign Affairs and International Cooperation of the Republic of Fiji
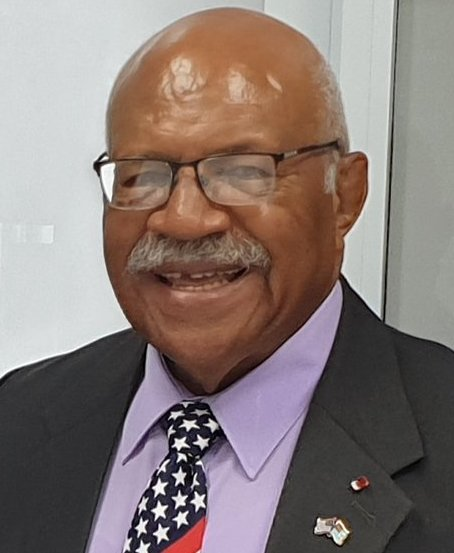
- Incumbent; Sitiveni Rabuka since 24 December 2022
- Ministry of Foreign Affairs and International Cooperation
- Status: Foreign minister
- Member of: Cabinet of Fiji
- Seat: Government Buildings
- Nominator: Prime Minister of Fiji
- Appointer: President of Fiji
- Term length: No term limit
- Inaugural holder: Kamisese Mara
- Formation: 10 October 1970; 55 years ago
- Salary: FJ$130,000 annually
- Website: www.foreignaffairs.gov.fj

The Minister for Foreign Affairs (commonly known as the Foreign Minister) is a cabinet minister responsible for foreign relations and diplomacy of Fiji, and oversees its Ministry of Foreign Affairs and International Cooperation. Especially since two military coups in 1987 harmed Fiji's relationship with other countries, with two more coups in 2000 and 2006 respectively, the Foreign Minister's position has been a very important one.

== Description of the office ==
Like other ministers, the Foreign Minister is formally appointed by the President on the nomination of the Prime Minister, and is responsible to both the Prime Minister and the Parliament. The position may be held independently, or in conjunction with other ministerial responsibilities. From time to time, the Prime Minister has simultaneously served as Foreign Minister.

Along with all ministers, the Foreign Minister is constitutionally required to be a member of the Parliament.

== List of ministers ==
Political parties

Alliance Party
Fiji Labour Party
Soqosoqo ni Vakavulewa ni Taukei
Soqosoqo Duavata ni Lewenivanua
FijiFirst
People's Alliance

Other factions

Military
Independent

Symbols

Denotes acting Minister

The following is a list of foreign ministers of Fiji since the country gained independence in 1970:

No.	Name (Birth–Death)	Portrait	Tenure
1	Ratu Sir Kamisese Mara (1920–2004)		1970–1982
2	Mosese Qionibaravi (1938–1987)		1982–1983
3	Jonati Mavoa (1922–1985)		1983–1985
4	Semesa Sikivou (1917–1990)		1985–1986
(1)	Ratu Sir Kamisese Mara (1920–2004)		1986–1987
5	Krishna Datt (born 1944)		1987 (Note: Deposed in the May 1987 coup d'état.)
(1)	Ratu Sir Kamisese Mara (1920–2004)		1987
6	Filipe Bole (1936–2019)		1987–1988
(1)	Ratu Sir Kamisese Mara (1920–2004)		1988–1992
(6)	Filipe Bole (1936–2019)		1992–1994
7	Major-General (Rtd) Sitiveni Rabuka (born 1948)		1994
(6)	Filipe Bole (1936–2019)		1994–1997
8	Berenado Vunibobo (1932–2015)		1997–1999
9	Tupeni Baba (1942–2024)		1999–2000 (Note: Deposed in the 2000 coup d'état.)
10	Kaliopate Tavola (born 1946)		2000–2006 (Note: Deposed in the 2006 coup d'état.)
—	Isikeli Mataitoga; Acting		2006–2007
11	Brigadier-General (Rtd) Ratu Epeli Nailatikau (born 1941)		2007–2008
12	Commodore Frank Bainimarama (born 1954)		2008–2009
(12)	Commodore Frank Bainimarama (born 1954)		2009
13	Ratu Inoke Kubuabola (born 1948)		2009–2016
(13)	Ratu Inoke Kubuabola (born 1948)		2009–2016
(12)	Rear Admiral (Rtd) Frank Bainimarama (born 1954)		2016–2019
14	Inia Seruiratu		2019–2020
(12)	Rear Admiral (Rtd) Frank Bainimarama (born 1954)		2020–2022
(7)	Major-General (Rtd) Sitiveni Rabuka (born 1948)		2022–present
