= Maciu Katamotu =

Fijian politician

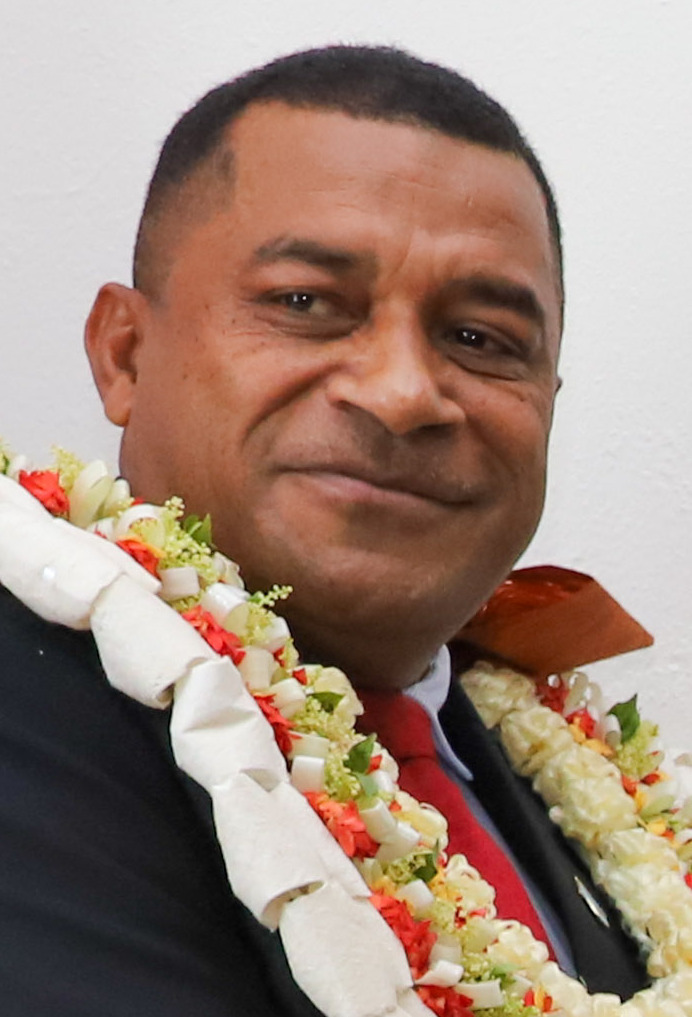

Minister for Housing and Local Government
- Incumbent
- Assumed office 24 December 2022
- Prime Minister: Sitiveni Rabuka

Member of the Fijian Parliament for PA List
- Incumbent
- Assumed office 14 December 2022

Personal details
- Born: 1970 or 1971 (age 54–55)
- Party: People's Alliance

Maciu Katamotu Nalumisa (born 1970/1971) is a Fijian politician and Cabinet Minister. He is a member of the People's Alliance.

Katamotu was educated at the University of the South Pacific. Before entering politics he worked as a banker and civil servant for the Housing Authority of Fiji. He was selected by his village as a replacement for SODELPA MP Ratu Suliano Matanitobua, who had been jailed for corruption, but ran as a People's Alliance rather than SODELPA candidate.

He was selected as a PA candidate in the 2022 Fijian general election, and was elected to Parliament, winning 2400 votes. Following the election he dedicated his win to Matanitobua. On 24 December 2022 he was appointed Minister for Housing and Local Government in the coalition government of Sitiveni Rabuka. After his appointment he promised to restore elected local government in Fiji.
