= Tomasi Tunabuna =

Fijian politician

Minister for Agriculture
- Incumbent
- Assumed office 4 August 2025
- Prime Minister: Sitiveni Rabuka

Member of the Fijian Parliament for PA List
- Incumbent
- Assumed office 14 December 2022

Personal details
- Born: 1962 or 1963 (age 62–63)
- Party: People's Alliance

Tomasi Niuvotu Tunabuna (born 1962/1963) is a Fijian politician and member of the Parliament of Fiji. He is a member of the People's Alliance.

Tunabuna is a former civil servant who served as director for Animal Health and Production for Fiji's Ministry of Agriculture from 2009 to 2019.

He was selected as a PA candidate in the 2022 Fijian general election, and was elected to Parliament, winning 2002 votes. On 24 December 2022 he was appointed Assistant Minister for Agriculture and Waterways in the coalition government of Sitiveni Rabuka.
