= Pio Tikoduadua =

Fijian politician, Minister, President of the National Federation Party (born 1966)

The Honourable Pio Tikoduadua MP
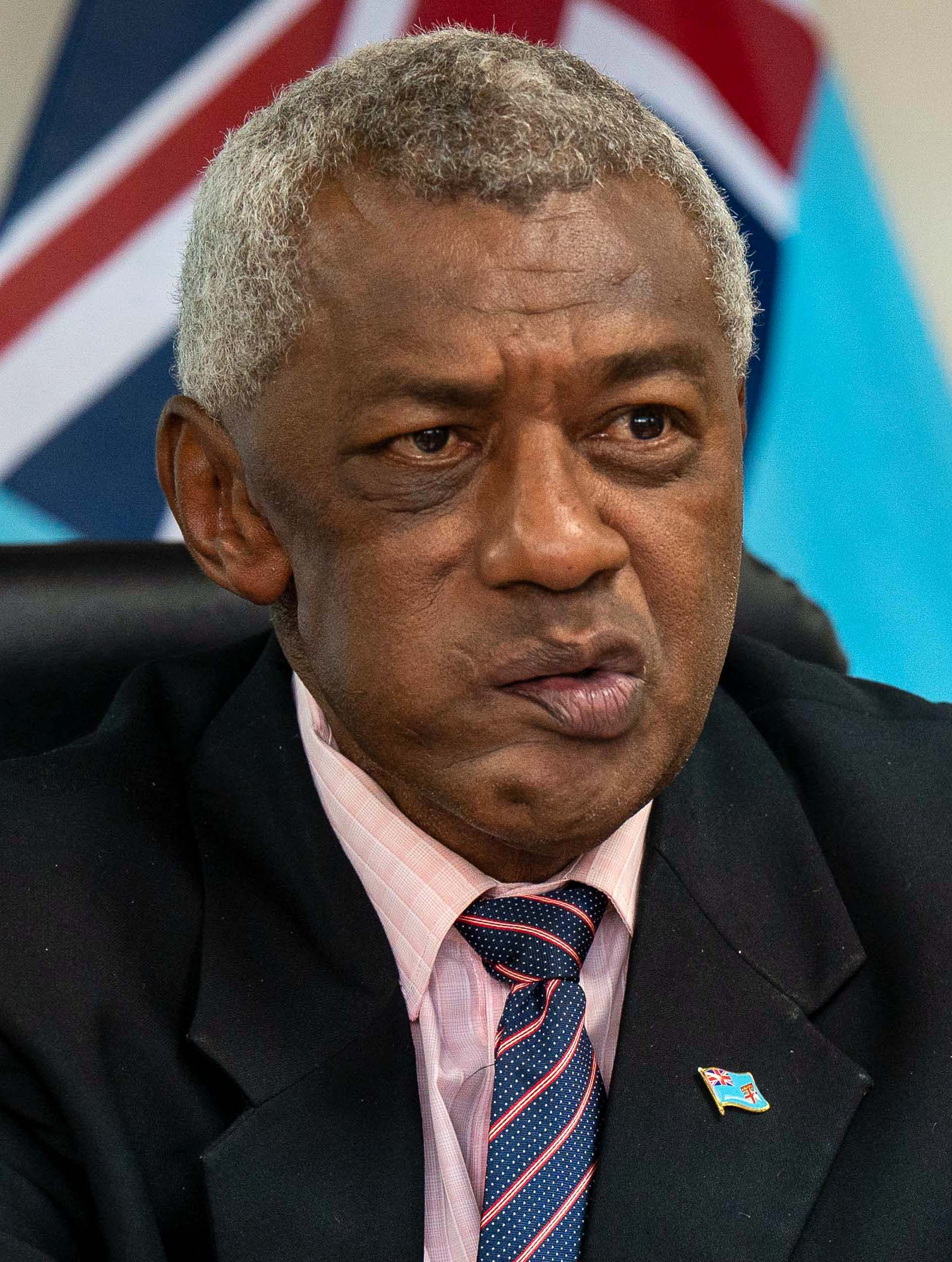
- Tikoduadua in 2023

Minister for Defence and Veteran’s Affairs
- Incumbent
- Assumed office 24 December 2022
- Prime Minister: Sitiveni Rabuka
- Preceded by: Inia Seruiratu

Minister for Home Affairs and Immigration
- In office 24 December 2022 – 1 December 2024
- Prime Minister: Sitiveni Rabuka
- Preceded by: Inia Seruiratu
- Succeeded by: Viliame Naupoto

President of the National Federation Party
- Incumbent
- Assumed office 3 June 2017
- Preceded by: Tupou Draunidalo

Minister for Infrastructure and Transport
- In office 24 September 2014 – 11 May 2015
- Prime Minister: Frank Bainimarama
- Succeeded by: Parveen Kumar

Member of the Fijian Parliament for NFP List
- Incumbent
- Assumed office 17 November 2018

Member of the Fijian Parliament for FijiFirst List
- In office 17 September 2014 – 11 May 2015

Personal details
- Born: 12 September 1966 (age 60) Korovou, Tailevu, Fiji
- Party: National Federation Party (2017 - Present); FijiFirst (2014 - 2015)
- Spouse: Sereana Ula Cagilaba (1971-)
- Children: 2
- Education: The University of New South Wales
- Website: www.nfpfiji.org

Lt Col Pio Tikoduadua (born 12 September 1966) is a Fijian politician, cabinet minister and member of the Parliament of Fiji. He is the current president of the National Federation Party.

== Early life and military career ==
Tikoduadua was born in Namalata, Tailevu and raised by his single mother, Senoveva Ranadi. He attended primary school at Natovi and Saint Vincent College as well as St John's College in Levuka. He joined the Republic of Fiji Military Forces cadet training school with the former RFMF Land Force Commander, Brigadier-General Mosese Tikoitoga. He also worked as an interpreter in the local courts to gain experience. He was educated at multiple universities including University of New South Wales, the Centre for Defence and Strategic Studies in Canberra and the Naval Postgraduate School in Monterey, California, reaching the rank of lieutenant colonel after graduating from the Australian Defence Force Command and Staff College in 2006. As a military officer, he has served in Lebanon, Egypt, East Timor and the Solomon Islands. He has also held several leadership roles before becoming chief of staff: Operations at the RFMF. Following the 2006 Fijian coup d'état he was one of a number of military officers appointed to senior public service positions. He was initially appointed as Permanent Secretary of Justice, and in 2008 as Permanent Secretary at the prime minister's office.

== FijiFirst and Cabinet ==
In June 2014, Tikoduadua resigned as permanent secretary to pursue a career in politics, joining the FijiFirst party. He was elected in the 2014 election, in which he won 3,611 votes. He was appointed to Cabinet as Minister for Infrastructure and Transport in September 2014. On 11 May 2015, he resigned as Minister due to his failing health as he was suffering from an advanced form of cancer and wanted to spend time with his family and his people in Delasui, Tailevu. He was replaced as Minister by Parveen Kumar.

== National Federation Party ==
In April 2017, he returned to politics, joining the National Federation Party. He expressed doubts about the actions of the military regime, including its rewriting of the constitution in 2013, and claimed that he resigned from FijiFirst after MP Dr Neil Sharma was forced to resign after voting against the government on a matter of conscience. In June 2017, he was appointed the NFP President.

He ran as a candidate for the NFP in the 2018 elections and was elected, winning 2684 votes.

In August 2019, Tikoduadua was assaulted by Fijian prime minister Frank Bainimarama after a parliamentary debate. The assault was captured on video, and was subsequently referred to the Fijian Parliament's Privileges Committee. The committee found that there was no assault, and that the two parties should apologise to each other for verbally attacking one another in parliament. When Tikoduadua refused to do so he was suspended from Parliament for six months. A police complaint for assault resulted in no charges being laid as it was a matter for parliament. Two parliamentary staff who had videoed the assault were forced to resign.

Tikoduadua returned to Parliament in March 2020. In April 2020, he was arrested for sharing a video exposing brutality by Fijian Police over Facebook. No charges were laid against him, and five police officers were later charged over the assault he exposed.

In July 2021, he was one of a number of opposition MPs detained by police after criticising government moves to amend land legislation.

He was re-elected in the 2022 election with 2222 votes. On 24 December 2022 he was appointed Minister for Home Affairs and Immigration in the coalition government of Sitiveni Rabuka. His first action as Minister was to ask Police Commissioner Sitiveni Qiliho to resign.

In November 2024, Pio Tikoduadua offered to temporarily step aside as Fiji's Minister for Home Affairs and Immigration to allow an impartial investigation into the unauthorized issuance of passports to members of the controversial Grace Road Church.
