= Social Democratic Liberal Party =

Political party in Fiji

- Abbreviation: SODELPA
- Leader: Aseri Radrodro
- President: Ratu Epenisa Cakobau
- General Secretary: Viliame Takayawa
- Founders: Tupeni Baba; Teimumu Kepa
- Founded: January 2013
- Preceded by: Soqosoqo Duavata ni Lewenivanua
- Headquarters: 66 McGregor Street, Suva
- Youth wing: Young SODELPA
- Women's wing: SODELPA Women
- Ideology: Conservatism; Decentralisation; Factions: Christian right; Fijian nationalism
- Political position: Centre-right to right-wing
- Colours: Blue
- Parliament of Fiji: 3 / 55

Website
- sodelpa.org (archived)

The Social Democratic Liberal Party, (SODELPA) also known as the Social Liberal Democratic Party, is a Fijian political party. The party was formed in January 2013 after the dissolution of the Soqosoqo Duavata ni Lewenivanua.

== History ==
=== Party foundation ===
In January 2013 Fiji's military regime promulgated new regulations governing the registration of political parties. Among the new provisions was a requirement that all political parties be named in English rather than Fijian. In order to retain its acronym, the Soqosoqo Duavata ni Lewenivanua (SDL) reformed as the Social Democratic Liberal Party. However, a subsequent amendment to the Political Parties Decree banned the use of the acronyms of former parties, forcing the party to change its acronym to 'SODELPA'.

The party was temporarily led by Tupeni Baba, but in March 2013 it unanimously selected former SDL Cabinet Minister Ro Teimumu Kepa as its first permanent leader.

The party applied for registration on 26 February 2013, and was registered on 3 May 2013.

=== 2014 elections ===
The party contested the 2014 elections, naming a list of 45 candidates in June. In July, it released its manifesto, promising to reduce poverty, restore the Great Council of Chiefs, and revive the Qoliqoli Bill, which had been stopped by the 2006 coup. The party gained 28.2 percent of the vote and 15 seats in Parliament. Following the election, party leader Teimumu Kepa became Leader of the Opposition.

In June 2016, Kepa announced that she was standing down as leader of SODELPA. She was replaced by former Prime Minister Sitiveni Rabuka.

=== 2018 elections ===
The party ran 51 candidates in the 2018 elections, seven of whom were women. It campaigned on a platform of restoring the 1997 constitution, promising to restore the Great Council of Chiefs within a hundred days if elected, and to consider changing the electoral system to restore communal constituencies. The party won 39.85% of the vote, increasing its number of MPs from 15 to 21.

=== 2020 suspension and leadership ===
On 26 May 2020, the party was suspended for 60 days for breaching the Political Parties Act. All appointees were declared null and void, and were given 60 days to rectify their issues or face deregistration. The registrar stated that the party's Vice President, Vijay Singh, is the only legitimate officeholder in the party. The party's suspension was lifted on 29 June.

In November 2020 the party elected Viliame Gavoka as leader, replacing Sitiveni Rabuka.

=== 2022 elections ===
The party contested the 2022 elections. On 30 April 2022 it announced an initial list of 28 candidates. The party ran 54 candidates during the election and finished fourth, obtaining 5.14% of the vote and receiving 3 seats in parliament. As neither known electoral alliance received a majority of seats, the party received kingmaker status. On 18 December 2022, the party revealed its "non-negotiable" terms to enter into a coalition, and is in discussions with other parties. Once the final results were released, following SODELPA's constitution, Gavoka ceased to be the leader as the party did not obtain a parliamentary majority. General Secretary Lenaitasi Duru announced the role of party leader would remain vacant until SODELPA's annual general meeting in 2024.

SODELPA announced its list of non-negotiable terms which included bringing back the Great Council of Chiefs, providing free tertiary education, forgiving student loans, and establishing an embassy in Jerusalem. SODELPA's youth wing demanded the party not form a government with FijiFirst. They also urged the party leadership to reconcile differences with Rabuka to bring Bainimarama's 16-year "dictatorial rule" to an end. On 19 December, SODELPA's management board met to discuss and decide the party they would form a coalition with. FijiVillage reported that some senior members of the management board pushed for a coalition with FijiFirst while others were against it. Ultimately, no decision was made and the party's negotiating team was sent back to the two leading parties to further review some aspects of their offer. A leaked letter from 18 December revealed that FijiFirst was offering ministerial portfolios to all three SODELPA members of parliament, but that SODELPA was intending to gain the post of deputy prime minister.

On 20 December, delegations from the two leading parties met with SODELPA's management board. Negotiations concluded and SODELPA announced the formation of a coalition government with the People's Alliance and its coalition partner, the National Federation Party, effectively ending FijiFirst's eight-year tenure and Bainimarama's 16-year premiership. The management board which consisted of 30 members voted in a secret ballot; 16 voted in favour of the opposition coalition while 14 voted for FijiFirst. The new coalition selected People's Alliance leader Sitiveni Rabuka as Prime Minister designate.

After the announcement, SODELPA's general secretary Duru resigned, claiming there was irregularities in the management board's vote and demanded that the result be declared null and void. He also wrote a letter to President Wiliame Katonivere to postpone the sitting of parliament until "issues were solved". Ultimately, the parliament sitting scheduled for 21 December was delayed as no announcement came from the president. On 21 December, the FijiFirst party refused to concede defeat; general secretary Aiyaz Sayed-Khaiyum said it can only be called after the election of the prime minister by parliament. He also questioned the validity of the new coalition citing concerns raised previously by SODELPA's outgoing general secretary.

Following communications between the elections supervisor and SODELPA's general secretary, the elections office announced that the decision made by the management board on 20 December was null and void. Some board members whose terms had expired were part of the meeting. As a result, another board meeting was held on 23 December and this time, 13 members voted for the opposition coalition while 12 voted for FijiFirst. The party's outgoing leader, Viliame Gavoka, said "Democracy had won; We went into it fully committed to ensuring that we have the best for this country. We believe and we have agreed on a way forward that benefits this country going forward."

== Ideology ==
SODELPA has been described as an Taukei ethno-nationalist party, as well as conservative and protectionist, contrasting with the more secularist and reformist party FijiFirst.

=== Health ===
The party supports the administration of COVID-19 vaccines.

=== Indigenous people ===
The party supported bringing back the Great Council of Chiefs, which was a condition of the coalition agreement between the People's Alliance, the NFP and SODELPA.

=== Social policy ===
SODELPA opposes same-sex marriage.

== Electoral history ==
=== Parliamentary elections ===
Election	Party leader	Votes	%	Seats	+/–	Position	Result
2014	Teimumu Kepa	139,857	28.20%	15 / 50	▲15	▲2nd	Opposition
2018	Sitiveni Rabuka	181,072	39.85%	21 / 51	▲6	2nd	Opposition
2022	Viliame Gavoka	24,172	5.14%	3 / 55	▼18	▼4th	PAP-NFP coalition government
