= FijiFirst =

Political party in Fiji (2014–2024)

FijiFirst iMatai ni Viti फिजी प्रथम
- Abbreviation: FF
- Leader: Frank Bainimarama
- President: Tema Varo
- Secretary-General: Faiyaz Koya (acting)
- Founded: 31 March 2014; 12 years ago
- Registered: 30 May 2014; 12 years ago
- Dissolved: 1 July 2024; 2 years ago
- Succeeded by: People First Party; One Nation
- Headquarters: 96 Brown Street, Suva
- Youth wing: FijiFirst Youth
- Ideology: Populism; Liberalism; Neoliberalism; Progressive authoritarianism; Secularism; Multiculturalism; Multiracialism; Anti-ethnic nationalism; Pro-privatisation
- Political position: Centre
- Colours: Light blue
- Slogan: The best future for all Fijians

Website
- fijifirst.com

FijiFirst (FF, Fijian: iMatai ni Viti; Fiji Hindi: फिजी प्रथम) was a liberal political party in Fiji. The party was formed in March 2014 by then Prime Minister, Frank Bainimarama. It was deregistered on 1 July 2024.

== Formation and history ==
The party was launched on 31 March 2014 with Bainimarama beginning a nationwide tour of the country in a campaign bus to collect the obligatory 5000 signatures necessary to register a political party. The party collected over 40,000 signatures for its registration.

Bainimarama says FijiFirst is a name that encompasses his political beliefs. He announced his first candidate as party president Jiko Luveni.

The party appointed former Fiji Labour Party senator Bijai Prasad as one of its Vice Presidents as well as the current Attorney General Aiyaz Sayed-Khaiyum as the party General secretary. Bijai Prasad resigned as VP a day later citing a criminal conviction for larceny in the 1980s for which he had served jail time. The Tui Macuata, Ratu Wiliame Katonivere was also selected as a vice president of the party. Vimlesh Kumar who is an accountant and an affiliate member of CPA Australia is listed as the treasurer.

The party's application for registration resulted in six complaints, including one claiming that "Fiji 1st" was previously used by another party. Despite this, the party was registered on 30 May 2014.

=== 2014 election ===
The party released its first batch of 21 candidates on July 25, 2014 with Frank Bainimarama heading the list. As a result of the 2014 Fijian general elections, the party won 293,714 votes, 59.2% of all those who voted (495,105 voters), giving the party a clear majority with 32 of the 50 Parliamentary seats.

=== 2018 election ===
The party ran 51 candidates in the 2018 elections, ten of which were women. FijiFirst won the 2018 general elections with a reduced majority from the 2014 elections. FijiFirst accumulated 227,241 of the votes that resulted on the party gaining 50.02% that allocated to 27 seats enough for the party to govern alone within a slim majority.

=== 2022 election ===
Despite remaining the first party in the 2022 election FijiFirst saw its vote share reducing again down to 42.55%, causing the party to lose its majority in the Parliament. With only 3 seats the SODELPA emerged as kingmaker, and after 6 days of negotiations it decided to support a PAP-led cabinet, effectively ending FijiFirst's eight-year tenure and Bainimarama's 16-year premiership.

On 29 March 2023, Inia Seruiratu was elected as the Leader of the Opposition taking over from Frank Bainimarama. However, Bainimarama remained party leader.

On 18 May 2023 the party was suspended and prohibiting from acting as a political party for 30 days for failing to submit annual accounts. The suspension was lifted on 9 June after the party submitted audited accounts.

On 11 December 2023 Aiyaz Sayed-Khaiyum resigned as general secretary of the FijiFirst party.

== Collapse and dissolution ==
On 31 May 2024 FijiFirst sacked 17 of its 26 MPs after they voted to increase their salaries against a party directive. When the MPs announced they would challenge their removal from Parliament, the party's administration, including party president Ratu Joji Satalaka, vice Presidents Selai Adimaitoga and Ravindran Nair, acting general secretary Faiyaz Koya, treasurer Hem Chand, as well as founding members Frank Bainimarama, Aiyaz Sayed-Khaiyum, and Salesh Kumar all resigned. On 14 June Speaker of the House Ratu Naiqama Lalabalavu ruled that the 17 MPs were not disqualified, as FijiFirst's notification was signed by Bainimarama, who as a convicted criminal could not exercise any functions in a registered political party. During the dispute the registrar of political parties was informed that the party did not have a legally-required dispute resolution mechanism in its constitution, and threatened to dissolve it if this was not remedied. The party was deregistered on 1 July 2024, its MPs becoming independents.

In August 2026, Leader of the Opposition Inia Seruiratu announced the formation of the People First Party (PFP) with several other former FijiFirst MPs. According to Seruiratu, the PFP identifies itself as the political successor to FijiFirst.

== Electoral history ==
=== Parliamentary elections ===
Election	Party leader	Votes	%	Seats	+/–	Position	Result
2014	Frank Bainimarama	293,714	59.17%	32 / 50	▲32	▲1st	Majority government
2018	Frank Bainimarama	227,241	52.94%	27 / 51	▼5	1st	Majority government
2022	Frank Bainimarama	200,246	42.55%	26 / 55	▼1	1st	Opposition
