= People's Alliance (Fiji) =

Political party in Fiji

- Leader: Sitiveni Rabuka
- President: Ratu Josefa Dimuri (acting)
- Deputy leaders: Manoa Kamikamica; Daniel Lobendahn; Ro Filipe Tuisawau
- General Secretary: Sila.R. Balawa
- Founded: 12 August 2021
- Registered: 8 September 2021
- Split from: SODELPA
- Headquarters: 9 Knolly Street, Suva
- Youth wing: People's Alliance Youth
- Ideology: Liberal conservatism Fijian nationalism; Market economy Historical: Social market economy
- Political position: Centre-right
- Colours: Blue; White; Maroon
- MPs in the Parliament of Fiji: 21 / 55

Website
- peoplesalliancefiji.org

The People's Alliance is a political party in Fiji. The party was formed in 2021 by Sitiveni Rabuka who served as Prime Minister of Fiji from 1992 to 1999 and again from December 2022.

== Background ==
Sitiveni Rabuka served as the leader of the Social Democratic Liberal Party (SODELPA) from June 2016 until November 2020, where he was ousted in a leadership contest. He resigned as leader of the opposition that same year and subsequently left SODELPA to form a new party.

== Formation ==
Founded by 11 members including Sitiveni Rabuka, the party was registered on 12 August 2021 and subsequently launched on 11 October 2021. On 9 April 2022, the party appointed Manoa Kamikamica as its Deputy Party Leader. Lynda Tabuya and Daniel Lobendahn were also appointed as deputy party leaders on 7 May 2022.

== 2022 election ==
The party ran 55 candidates in the 2022 Fijian general election. On 8 April 2022, the party signed a memorandum of understanding with the National Federation Party indicating an agreement to work together post-election. The People's Alliance gained 21 seats becoming the second largest party in Parliament. Its coalition partner NFP secured 5 seats. Both parties with their shared number of seats failed to secure a parliamentary majority. Ultimately, SODELPA chose the People's Alliance and its coalition partner and a three-party coalition government was formed.

== Leadership ==
The party leader and deputy leaders are appointed by the People's Executive Council which serves as the governing body of the party. The party has three deputy leaders, in accordance with its constitution. Since the party's formation in 2021, Sitiveni Rabuka is the leader of the party. Serving as his deputy leaders are Manoa Kamikamica, Lynda Tabuya and Daniel Lobendahn.

=== Party leader ===
Portrait	Leader	Term began	Term ended	Time in office	Position	Prime Minister
	Sitiveni Rabuka (born 1948)	12 August 2021	Incumbent	5 years, 59 days	—	Bainimarama (2006–2022)
	Sitiveni Rabuka (born 1948)	12 August 2021	Incumbent	5 years, 59 days	Prime Minister 2022–present	himself

=== Deputy party leaders ===
Deputy leader	Term	Position
Manoa Kamikamica	2022–2025	Deputy Prime Minister (2022-2025)
Manoa Kamikamica	2022–2025	Minister for External Trade Cooperatives and SMEs (2022-2025)
Ro filipe Qaraniqio Tuisawau	2022–present	Minister for Public Works, Transport and Meteorological Services (2022-present)
Daniel Lobendahn	2022–present	—

== Electoral history ==
=== Parliamentary elections ===
Election	Party leader	Votes	%	Seats	+/–	Position	Result
2022	Sitiveni Rabuka	168,581	35.82%	21 / 55	▲21	▲2nd	PAP-NFP-SODELPA coalition government
