= COVID-19 pandemic in Fiji =

Aspect of viral disease pandemic

- Disease: COVID-19
- Pathogen: SARS-CoV-2
- Location: Fiji
- First outbreak: Wuhan, Hubei, China
- Index case: Lautoka, Western Division, Viti Levu
- Arrival date: 19 March 2020
- Confirmed cases: 68,375
- Active cases: 186
- Recovered: 68,189
- Deaths: 878
- Fatality rate: 1.11%
- Vaccinations: 604,488 of the target population of 618,173 has received at least one dose. 98%; 569,791 of the target population of 618,173 has been fully vaccinated. 92%

Government website
- Health.gov.fj

The COVID-19 pandemic in Fiji is part of the worldwide pandemic of coronavirus disease 2019 (COVID-19) caused by severe acute respiratory syndrome coronavirus 2 (SARS-CoV-2). The first case of the disease in Fiji was reported on 19 March 2020 in Lautoka. as of 3 January 2022, the country has had a total of 55,009 cases as of which 2,417 are currently active and 702 deaths, with cases reported on all divisions of the country. Apart from the COVID-19 deaths, 621 COVID-19 positive patients have died from pre-existing non-COVID-19 related illnesses. In March 2021, Fiji became the first Pacific island country to receive COVID-19 vaccines through the COVAX initiative with frontline workers and first responders the first to be vaccinated. As of 2 January 2022, more than 600,000 (98%) Fijians have received their first jab of the vaccine and almost 560,000 (92%) Fijians have received their second jab and are fully vaccinated. To date, only the AstraZeneca vaccine, Moderna vaccine and the Pfizer BioNTech vaccine have been deployed in the country. The country have also administered booster shots. Vaccination is mandated, however only to the adult population.

In the early stages of the pandemic, Fiji imposed travel bans on highly affected countries. As the pandemic worsened, Fiji closed all borders and ports to non-residents. Ports were closed on 16 March 2020 and the main international airport in Nadi was closed on 26 March 2020. Returning citizens were required to self-isolate at a government funded facility for 14 days, supervised by Health Officials and the Military. Domestically, the government responded by imposing a national curfew, restricting large gatherings and closing down schools and non-essential services. The government imposed lockdowns in the two largest cities of Lautoka and Suva and developed a contact tracing app named careFIJI. The government established a Centre for Disease Control for COVID-19 testing and built fever clinics nationwide for temperature checks. Such measures helped eliminate local transmissions of the virus for more than a year.

From July 2020 to April 2021, Fiji only recorded cases from managed quarantine facilities at the border as repatriation flights brought stranded citizens back home. This has allowed the country to relax its COVID-19 restrictions to boost its economic recovery however on 19 April 2021, Fiji confirmed its first community case as a result of a breach in protocol. In response, the township of Nadi and the city of Lautoka went into a lockdown and previous health restrictions were re-imposed all over the country with the national curfew restored. As local transmission cases soared exacerbated by the Delta variant, the Government sealed off the main island of Viti Levu establishing Suva, Lautoka, Nadi, Nausori, Rakiraki and Lami as containment areas which meant that over 70% of the population was now in lockdown. The government also activated FEMAT (Fiji Emergency Medical Assistance Team) in Suva and Lautoka. The virus penetrated prominent hospitals of Fiji including the Fiji CDC, Lautoka Hospital and the headquarters of the Ministry of Health which prompted senior health officials to go into self isolation. High number of cases continue to be recorded from the Western and Central division, with daily records being broken almost every second day. Despite this, the government has ruled out any possibility of a nationwide lockdown adding that their directive would be on targeted lockdowns instead.

The government rolled out unemployment benefits and provided food rations to targeted communities that were under lockdowns. In August 2021, the Ministry of Health suspended its contact tracing efforts and as a result, the daily number of confirmed cases dropped. The country's fastest vaccination rate was also another factor that contributed to the decrease in cases. By 10 October, the country surpassed the 80% threshold for fully vaccinated individuals which prompted the government to ease restrictions nation-wide and announcing the re-opening of the country's domestic and international border to fully vaccinated individuals. The government also announced the resumption of school as the country has also begun vaccinating its younger population aged 12 to 17 with the Pfizer BioNtech and Moderna COVID-19 vaccine.

The pandemic forced Fiji to reduce its interest rate. The country's economy is expected to contract after decades of economic growth due to the pandemic's impact on tourism, retail, manufacturing and trade. The International Labour Organisation and the Asian Development Bank issued reports about workers being affected and warned about the rising youth unemployment rate and child labour. The impacts has also prompted residents to leave the country for short term employment overseas. There were even reported incidents of racism and xenophobia against Chinese people or to those perceived as such. Misinformation and conspiracy theories surfaced about the COVID-19 vaccines, the origin of the virus and the government's response to the pandemic. Domestic violence and assault cases against women also increased as a result of lockdowns. Protests also broke out in lockdown communities due to the delay of delivering rations as well as unemployment.

As of 24 February 2023, a total of 1,553,053 vaccine doses have been administered.

== Background ==
On 12 January 2020, the World Health Organization (WHO) confirmed that a novel coronavirus was the cause of a respiratory illness in a cluster of people in Wuhan City, Hubei Province, China, who had initially come to the attention of the WHO on 31 December 2019.

Compared to SARS of 2003, the case fatality ratio for COVID-19 has been much lower, but the transmission has been significantly greater, with a significant total death toll.

== Timeline of cases ==
Cases

Deaths

Fiji confirmed its first imported case on 19 March 2020. The country subsequently confirmed its second case and first community transmission on 21 March, which was connected to the first imported case. The number of COVID-19 cases in Fiji remained low throughout 2020 with the country reporting a total of 49 COVID-19 cases, mainly in quarantine, by 30 December 2020.

Between January and March 2021, Fiji experienced a low number of imported cases. By 15 January 2021, the country had reported a total of 55 cases since the first case was detected on 19 March 2020. By 27 February 2021, Fiji had reported a total of 55 cases since 19 March 2020. By 8 March, Fiji had reported a total of 66 cases, 57 recoveries, and two deaths since March 2020.

From April 2021, Fiji experienced a rapid surge in community cases after a community transmission was reported in the city of Nadi on 19 April 2021. As a result, Nadi was placed into lockdown. By 30 April, there were 50 active cases in managed isolation (five older quarantine cases from before 18 April, 14 new imported cases, and 29 local transmissions).

By 31 May 2021, Fiji had reported a total of 438 cases since March 2020 including 267 active cases. 368 of these cases are linked to the community outbreak that began in April 2021. There have been a total of 167 recoveries and four deaths since March 2020.

By 30 June 2021, Fiji had reported a total of 4,418 cases since March 2020, with 4,348 of these been recorded since April 2021. There were 3,503 active cases and 882 recoveries in total. In addition, the death toll had risen to 21.

The situation became worse and by 31 July 2021, Fiji had reported a total of 29,781 cases since March 2020, with 29,711 of these been recorded since April 2021. There were 21,707 active cases and 7,705 recoveries in total. In addition, the death toll had risen drastically to 238.

In August 2021, the number of daily cases dropped as a result of the Ministry of Health's decision to suspend its contact tracing efforts and focus instead on monitoring patients at higher risk. From mid to late August 2021, the virus reached the main island of Vanua Levu, outer islands of Malolo, Naviti and Kadavu, as a result of breaches in travel restrictions.

By 31 August 2021, Fiji had reported a total of 46,716 cases since March 2020. There were 19,151 active cases and 26,761 recoveries in total. In addition, the death toll rose to 496. On 12 September 2021, the virus reached the island of Beqa.

On 7 October 2021, Permanent Secretary for Health Dr James Fong announced that all future Health Ministry updates would be published on Mondays, Wednesdays, and Fridays only.

By 29 December, the total number of cases had reached 53,332; the total number of recoveries had reached 51,223; and the death toll had reached 698. Dr Fong described the new surge of cases as the beginning of the third wave of COVID-19 in Fiji.

On 4 January 2022, the Health Ministry confirmed that the Omicron variant was present in Fiji following testing by the Health Ministry and the Doherty Institute. On 23 February, the Health Ministry reported one case of the BA.2 variant at the border.

== Government responses ==
=== February 2020 ===
On 3 February, the Government of Fiji toughened border security. Borders were closed to foreign nationals who have been in mainland China within 14 days of their intended travel to Fiji. Measures to maintain a hygienic environment and screening ill passengers will continue to be taken in-flight to further minimise any risk.

On 27 February, Fiji extended its travel ban and announced that travellers from Italy, Iran and the South Korean cities of Daegu and Cheongdo would be denied entry. From 28 February, all cruise ships entering Fiji have been required to make first berths at ports in Suva and Lautoka, where passengers undergo medical and travel history checks.

=== March 2020 ===
On 15 March, Prime Minister Frank Bainimarama had announced that from 16 March cruise ships will be banned from berthing anywhere in Fiji and international events will not be allowed in Fiji. Government ministers and staff will be restricted from travelling overseas.

Prime Minister Frank Bainimarama announced a further extension of the ban to foreign nationals who had been present in the United States, as well as all of Europe including the United Kingdom. Also all travellers arriving in or returning to Fiji from outside of the country had to self-isolate for 14 days.

On 20 March, all schools and non-essential businesses in Lautoka had been closed at midnight, however banks, supermarkets, pharmacies and essential businesses remained open. The Minister for Education, Heritage and Arts Rosy Akbar in consultation with the Prime Minister announced that the national term one school holidays that were initially scheduled from 20 April to 1 May would be brought forward, to 23 March to 3 April. Fiji Airways suspended all international flights until the end of May, with the exception of twice-weekly services between Singapore and Nadi. The government established two fever clinics in Lautoka.

On 23 March, the Fijian Government established eight fever clinics around the country with six clinics running in Nasinu, Labasa, Savusavu, and Nabouwalu. Two others had been running in Lautoka since 20 March.

On 25 March, Prime Minister Frank Bainimarama announced that Nadi International Airport would shut down from 26 March and all local shipping services would cease from 29 March.

On 26 March, Attorney General and Minister for Economy Aiyaz Sayed-Khaiyum revealed the COVID-19 response budget.

On 27 March, Prime Minister Frank Bainimarama announced a nationwide curfew from 10 p.m. to 5 a.m. that would take effect on 30 March.

On 30 March, Minister for Education, Heritage and Arts Rosy Akbar announced that the school holidays would be extended for another two weeks until 17 April.

=== April 2020 ===
On 1 April, Minister for Health and Medical Services Ifereimi Waqainabete announced that the Lautoka lockdown would be extended until 7 April to ensure that no COVID-19 cases were left undetected.

On 16 April, Prime Minister Frank Bainimarama announced that schools would remain closed until 15 June. He also announced the extension of the quarantine period to a full 28 days, both for anyone who was newly quarantined and to those who currently were waiting out their initial 14-day period.

=== May 2020 ===
On 8 May, Fiji Airways extended all flight suspension until the end of June due to the prolonged impact of the COVID-19 pandemic.

=== June 2020 ===
On 5 June, the Ministry of Education extended the school break for another two weeks with the anticipated reopening date set on 30 June.

On 21 June, Fiji announced the relaxation of the COVID-19 restrictions as part of its efforts to restart the economy. Prime Minister Frank Bainimarama announced new nationwide curfew hours from 11:00 p.m. to 4:00 a.m. that came into effect on 22 June. Social gathering numbers, which also include gatherings at weddings, funerals, cafes, restaurants and worship, were increased from 20 to 100 people. Gyms, fitness centers, cinemas and swimming pools were re-opened on 22 June, however nightclubs remained closed. Schools were re-opened for year 12 and 13 students on 30 June, and universities could also re-open for face to face classes. The Prime Minister announced the Bula Bubble plan for some Pacific Island countries and also for the Australian and New Zealand tourism markets. The plan stipulated that travellers could either present a medical certificate from a recognized medical institution certifying their 14 days quarantine in their home country, along with proof of a negative COVID-19 test result within 48 hours upon arriving in Fiji, or complete 14 days quarantine in Fiji at their own cost, after which they could start their Bula Bubble.

On 30 June, Fiji quarantined 160 Fijian peacekeeping soldiers who had returned from Sinai in Egypt. The military had expressed concern that some of the troops may have been in contact with individuals who had tested positive for COVID-19.

=== December 2020 ===
On 5 December, the Ministry of Health launched an investigation about a COVID-19 related risk at the Lautoka Hospital and disallowed visitors from entering.

On 22 December, the COVID-19 Risk Mitigation Taskforce (CRMT) (Note: The COVID-19 Risk Mitigation Taskforce is a cabinet-mandated working group consisting of the Permanent Secretaries for Economy (Chair), Health and Medical Services and Commerce, Trade, Tourism, and Transport. The Secretariat support is provided by the Ministry of Commerce, Trade, Tourism and Transport, Border Health Protection, Incident Management Team, and Republic of Fiji Military Forces Surveillance team) announced that all inbound passenger flights to Fiji scheduled between 24 December and 28 December have been ceased. This is in response of the discovery of a new variant of the novel coronavirus, Variant of Concern 202012/01 in the United Kingdom which appears to be more contagious than previous variants. Thus, the Ministry of Health used that time to conduct an extensive review of its border quarantine processes.

=== April 2021 ===
On 19 April, Fiji's two largest cities of Lautoka and Nadi entered into a lockdown after the country recorded its first community transmission in 12 months. This community case is a 53-year-old woman who is a close contact of a managed isolation worker. Her relatives have been placed into quarantine. Schools nationwide has been closed for three weeks.

In response to four community transmissions reported on 25 April, the Government established Suva, Nausori and Lami as containment areas with restricted movement in place for two weeks.

On 30 April, the Fijian Government announced the cities of Suva and Nausori will go into lockdown for two days to speed up its contact tracing efforts.

=== May 2021 ===
On 6 May, the Fijian government activated the Fiji Emergency Medical Assistance Team (FEMAT) and dispatched its medical carrier vessel MV Veivueti to Lautoka.

In response to the rising cases, the Government announced on 12 May that it would impose a lockdown in Suva and Nausori from 14 May until 18 May. On 13 May, the lockdown was later extended until 19 May due to the rapid increase in contacts of COVID-19 patients.

=== July 2021 ===
As cases continue to mount, the Fiji Police Force announced on 6 July that they would be arresting individuals who fail to wear a mask in a public place within containment zones.

On 8 July, Prime Minister Frank Bainimarama in a video address to the nation announced that jabs will be compulsory in the private and public sector adding that "Fiji is now amongst a handful of countries that have taken the oath of no jab, no job". Unvaccinated civil servants will be sacked if they refused to take a COVID-19 vaccine.

On 16 July, the government allocated more than $400 million to the Ministry of Health and Medical Services in its 2021-22 national budget which include $25 million dedicated fully to its COVID-19 response. The government also developed vaccine passports which is a digital vaccination certificate used in case of domestic or international travel.

On 25 July, the Ministry of Health and Medical Services announced a 6:00 p.m to 4:00 a.m curfew effective from 26 July for the Western Division as it experiences a surge in COVID-19 cases.

=== August 2021 ===
In response to the one new case confirmed in Nabouwalu Vanua Levu on August 14, the Ministry of Health initiated an area of restricted movement for 14 days. It was later sealed off by police on August 18 and established a containment zone. The island of Kadavu confirmed its first case on August 19 and in response, seven villages were sealed off and established a containment zone for 14 days.

The Island of Kadavu was placed on high alert and villagers were urged to follow COVID-19 protocols. The Ministry of Health activated its clinical response plan and urged maritime islanders to not engage in unauthorised travel. The government assistance which include food rations and the $360 unemployment assistance for every 3 months will continue until COVID-19 is eradicated.

By 22 August, 40% of the target population were fully vaccinated, which prompted the government to roll back the curfew by an hour with the new curfew from 7:00 p.m to 4:00 a.m. The village of Nabukalevu-I-Ra went into lockdown on August 23.

On 26 August, travel to the island of Koro was suspended. A restricted movement zone was imposed on the town of Labasa the next day with a new curfew of 8:00 p.m to 4:00 a.m in effect. A COVID response team was dispatched to Kadavu while the island of Somosomo was placed on high alert after confirming its first case on August 23.

On 27 August, a settlement in Labasa went into lockdown to contain the virus present in the community.

=== September 2021 ===
On 4 September, the Fijian Government announced that only fully vaccinated travellers will be allowed to enter the country when borders are expected to reopen in November 2021. The only exceptions will be emergencies. The curfew was renewed with the new curfew starting from 8:00 a.m to 4:00 p.m as more than 50% of the target population have been fully vaccinated.

On 8 September, the village of Yaqeta in Yasawa was placed on high alert after a person who drowned a week prior tested positive for COVID-19. Meanwhile, active cases in Labasa, Vanua Levu remains under observation and assessment.

On 12 September, the island of Beqa confirmed its first case. In response, the Ministry of Health dispatched a health team to the island.

On 17 September, Fiji crossed the 60% threshold for fully vaccinated individuals. In response, the curfew was moved back by an hour with the new curfew starting from 9:00 p.m to 4:00 a.m. The containment borders in Viti Levu was also lifted meaning that domestic travel within the main island is allowed.

On 29 September, the curfew was renewed with the new curfew starting from 10:00 p.m to 4:00 a.m as a result of the country crossing the 70% threshold for fully vaccinated individuals.

=== October 2021 ===
On 10 October, Director-General Dr James Fong confirmed that the Health Ministry would now only monitor for COVID-19 transmission and intervene when disease indicators cross beyond acceptable levels. That same day, Prime Minister Bainimarama announced that classes for Years 12 and 13 students would resume from 1 November due to efforts to vaccinate 15-17 year olds. In addition, curfews and restrictions on gatherings including funerals, birthdays and weddings were eased.

On 10 October, Bainamarama also announced that quarantine restrictions could be eased from 11 November for a selected number of travel partner countries including New Zealand, Australia, the United States, United Kingdom, United Arab Emirates, Canada, Qatar, Germany, Spain, France, South Korean, Singapore, Switzerland, Japan and most Pacific island countries and territories. That same day, Bainamarama announced that fully vaccinated Fijians can travel to Vanua Levu by boat, air or COVID-19 compliant transport companies such as Fiji Link.

=== November 2021 ===
On 1 November, schools reopened for Years 12 and 13 students subject to COVID-Safe protocols, following an extended six and a half month break.

By 5 November, Fiji's full COVID-19 vaccination rate had reached 88.3% (546,105) while 96.7% of eligible adults (597,991) had received their first dose. On 8 November, the Health Ministry sent personnel to villages and communities with low vaccination rates to boost vaccination rates.

On 8 November, the Permanent Secretary for Health Dr James Fong confirmed that frontliners and Fijians with comorbid issues who were the first to receive the COVID-19 jabs will be prioritized for booster shots.

On 19 November, the country's national curfew was pushed back by one hour from 11 pm to 12 am after Fiji reached its 90% full vaccination rate.

On 24 November, Dr Fong confirmed that tourists entering the country would not have to undergo traditional quarantine. Tourists will be required to stay at CareFiji Commitment certified hotels and resorts but will be free to travel around Fiji.

=== December 2021 ===
On 14 December, Dr Fong stated that the Health Ministry was concerned about misinformation about the SARS-CoV-2 Omicron variant on social media platforms. Fiji had reported its first two cases of the Omicron variant on 7 December as a result of overseas travel from Africa.

On 21 December, Police Commissioner Brigadier-General Sitiveni Qiliho confirmed that curfew hours would remain from 12 midnight to 4 am; rebutting social media rumors that the Government planned to lift curfew hours.

On 29 December, Dr Fong confirmed that the Health Ministry was preparing for a likely surge in COVID-19 community cases during the Christmas holiday season. Dr Fong indicated that the Fijian Government may reintroduce earlier curfews, restrictions on gatherings, and expanding mask mandates to combat a rise in community cases. That same day, Dr Fong announced that all travelers would have to produce a negative polymerase chain reaction (PCR) test two days prior to traveling from 1 January 2022.

On 30 December, Dr Fong described the new surge of cases as the beginning of the third wave of COVID-19 in Fiji. That same day, the Health Ministry suspended all leave for medical staff in the country's Northern Division. In addition, the Health Ministry imposed new restrictions on inter-island travel and shipping while Dr Fong urged members of the public to suspend maritime travel.

=== January 2022 ===
On 2 January, the Health Ministry's Permanent Secretary Dr Fong confirmed that the Government would be avoiding "population blanket" measures such as lockdowns to combat the third wave of COVID-19. Since lockdowns had adversely impacted the community, Fond stated that the Government would be pursuing "individual COVID safety measures" such as vaccination, masking, physical distancing, avoiding crowds and hand hygiene. That same day, Major General Ro Jone Kalouniwai confirmed that the Republic of Fiji Military Forces would be continuing to support the Health Ministry's efforts to combat COVID-19.

On 4 January, the Health Ministry revised Fiji's quarantine and isolation requirements. Healthcare workers testing positive for COVID-19 will be required to self-isolate at home for seven days, become asymptomatic and return a negative rapid diagnostic test on the sixth and seventh days before resuming work. They will also required to wear facemasks for the remaining three days of the ten-day isolation period.

On 5 January, the Health Minister Ifereimi Waqainabete announced that all travelers to the Eastern Division would have to produce a negative COVID-19 test four days prior to their travel.

On 9 January, the Minister for Trade and Commerce Faiyaz Koya announced that informal gatherings in homes, communities, and community halls would be limited to 20 people from 10 January. That same day, the Ministry of Commerce, Trade, Tourism and Transport (MCTTT) introduced a series of new fines in response to the Omicron variant spreading throughout the country. These include a $250 fine for failing to wear face masks, and fines for businesses failing to maintain records or have QR codes for scanning.

On 19 January, Dr Fong stated that non-compliance with "COVID-safe" measures in populated areas and negligence with abiding by social gathering limits was contributing to a nationwide surge in COVID-19 cases.

=== February 2022 ===
On 7 February, the Minister for Economy Aiyaz Sayed-Khaiyum confirmed that polymerase chain reaction testing would no longer be require to enter Fiji. In addition, travellers aged 12 years and above entering Fiji from a "Travel Partner Country" could produce a negative rapid antigen test within 24 hours of their flight's scheduled departure.

On 12 February, the Health Minister Ifereimi Waqainabete confirmed that unvaccinated individuals were still exempted from entering several public spaces including places of worship, sporting venues, and high-risk businesses.

On 22 February, Health Secretary Dr Fong announced that the mask wearing mandate would continue due to the ongoing COVID-19 pandemic. He added that it was imperative for people to wear masks in areas of high levels of transmissions or if they have a weakened immune system.

== International responses ==
=== Intergovernmental and international organizations ===
- World Health Organization – placed an epidemiologist in the Ministry of Health and Medical Services and provided medical supplies of 888,500 surgical masks, 53,400 N95 masks, 29,200 face shields, 2,000 protective goggles, 4,000 isolation gowns and 26,750 GeneXpert testing cartridges. The WHO Regional Director for the Western Pacific Dr Takeshi Kasai praised Fiji's response saying "Going 200 days without reporting any locally transmitted cases of COVID-19 is a huge achievement."
- World Bank – provided funding of US$7.4 million (FJ$16 million) to strengthen Fiji's health system. The Bank also provided additional medical supplies of Personal Protective Equipment (PPE), intensive care units (ICU) and ventilators as well as installing medical incinerators that will serve three divisional hospital. Country Director for the World Bank in Papua New Guinea and the Pacific Islands Michel Kerf praised Fiji's response saying "Fiji's swift, comprehensive response to the threat posed by COVID-19 has been an achievement that has been deservedly recognized globally."
- European Union – The EU main instrument in the pandemic response was to support the Government's budget thus provided $50 million in support of the Government's COVID-19 phase.

=== Sovereign states ===
- Australia – provided $15.4 million in budget support to the Government of Fiji. Australian High Commissioner to Fiji John Feakes commended the Ministry of Health's work in combating the pandemic. In response to rising cases in Fiji in June 2021, Australia and New Zealand sent a joint team of medical specialists to help. By November 2021, Australia had donated 1.1 million COVID-19 vaccine doses to Fiji.
- China – donated more than $200,000 worth of medical supplies. President of the Fiji China Friendship Association Fang Fang Jamnadas says most of the medical supplies was donated by the Chinese government and various private Chinese businesses. In October 2021, the Chinese Nursing Association donated medical supplies and personal protective equipment to the Fiji Nursing Association through the Belt and Road Initiative.
- Japan – provided $200 million emergency loan. This money is directed in strengthening health and medical services.
- New Zealand – provided $1.5 million in cash. NZ Ambassador to Fiji Jonathan Curr added that this will be directed to Fijian businesses. In late April 2021, New Zealand Associate Minister of Health William Sio confirmed that New Zealand would donate 250,000 doses of the Oxford–AstraZeneca COVID-19 vaccine in response to a surge of cases in Fiji. New Zealand along with Australia contributed a joint team of medical specialists in June 2021. On 11 August, the New Zealand Government designated Fiji as a "very high risk" country due to rising cases, limiting travel to New Zealand citizens, their partners and children, and parents of dependent children who are New Zealand citizens. On 24 November, New Zealand removed Fiji from its "very high risk category," allowing travellers from Fiji to enter New Zealand on the same basis as other international travellers from early December 2021.

== Impacts ==
=== Economy ===
When Fiji confirmed its first case of COVID-19, there was a surge in panic shopping seen in supermarkets in Suva, Lautoka and Labasa. On 18 March, the Reserve Bank of Fiji reduced its overnight policy rate (OPR) (Note: The OPR is the key interest rate used by the Reserve Bank of Fiji (RBF) to officially indicate and communicate its monetary policy stance. A reduction in the OPR signifies an easing of monetary policy.) and predicted the domestic economy to fall into a recession after decades of economic growth. GDP is expected to contract severely in 2020, with the economy predicted to contract by 21.7 per cent in the same year due to poor tourism activity. Annual inflation remained in negative territory in May (−1.7%) and is forecast to edge up to 1.0 percent by year-end.

Fiji Airways had suspended all Singapore and Hong Kong flights after the two countries introduced border restrictions.

In April 2020, the Construction Industry Council reported that they are already experiencing a downturn affecting construction projects due to limited raw materials. On 2 August, the International Labour Organization estimated that 115,000 Fijian workers have been affected by the COVID-19 pandemic, adding that sectors affected include tourism, retail and manufacturing.

Barter trades have become popular in the Facebook group called Barter for a better Fiji as Fijians opt for cashless trade movement. U.S. broadcaster CBS postponed production of its reality shows Love Island and Survivor in Fiji, with Love Island later being relocated to Las Vegas for its second season and the forty-first season of Survivor being pushed to 2021.

On 10 October 2020, the International Labour Organization and the Asian Development Bank issued a report stating that the youth unemployment rate is set to increase as high as 18 percent. A report issued by the Fiji Statistics Bureau shows that Fiji had 1,000 visitors in September 2020 compared to 81,354 visitors last September. It also reported that more than 500 Fijian residents left the country for short term employment.

Impact of COVID-19 on Government Revenue for the Year 2020
Particulars	Change
Private Loan	▼51.4%
VAT	▼38.6%
Bank Loan	▼28%
Investment in building & construction	▼24%
Review notes lending to the wholesale, retail, hotels & restaurants sector	▼21%
Investment in real estate	▼21%

=== Social ===
On 5 February, FBC reported that a local Chinese had been berated publicly at a bus station by a man claiming the victim had COVID-19. On 3 March, a 24-year-old man lied to a nurse and a doctor about having COVID-19 adding that he had returned from Japan in which he did not wear a face mask. He was remanded and investigated at which authorities learnt that he had no history of travel. On 22 October, he was sentenced to six months imprisonment.

An opposition Fijian member of parliament Mitieli Bulanauca mentioned that COVID-19 has been spread by evil forces to assist China and they're responsible for the crisis we are in which is being assisted by satanic forces. Bulanauca also claimed that the World Health Organization (WHO) had sided with China over the poor handling of the COVID-19 outbreak. The Chinese Embassy in Fiji condemned claims made by Bulanauca saying that it is shocked and disappointed as Bulanauca's remarks are not factual and were taken from fake social media pages.

The Fiji Women's Crisis Centre received an increase number of domestic violence cases during the lockdowns with the national domestic violence helpline receiving over 500 calls in April 2020. Also, the Ministry of Women, Children and Poverty Alleviation recorded more than 1000 assault cases against women. The pandemic has also affected medicine supply for local cancer patients, health centers and hospitals. The International Labour Organisation has also noted about the rise in child labour amidst the pandemic.

On 6 December 2020 when two sailors from a cargo ship tested positive for COVID-19, unverified claims on social media stated that there would be a lockdown in Suva specifically in the Queen Elizabeth Barracks. The Ministry of Health has denied those claims however strict COVID-19 protocols were enforced at the Barracks as a "precautionary measure" to prevent any local transmissions.

During the COVID-19 pandemic, academic Tarisi Vunidilo created the social media platform Talanoa with Dr T to enable connection between Fiji's primary school children and their heritage.

Fijian authorities have ruled out imposing a lockdown in response to the COVID-19 outbreak in 2021, claiming that the public would not comply. 1News journalist Barbara Dreaver described the Government's decision as unusual since the authorities had imposed lockdowns following the previous coups in Fiji. There were also reports of people not complying with social distancing rules and hosting kava parties.

In mid-January 2022, the Permanent of Health Dr Fong expressed concern about the impact of COVID-19 and the need to maintain emergency mode operations on the mental health and well-being of healthcare workers; citing a World Health Organization report that one in four health workers around the world had experienced mental health issues as a result of the COVID-19 pandemic.

In early February 2022, FBC News reported that students and teachers at several schools were flouting mask mandate requirements. In response, the Education Minister Premila Kumar expressed disappointment in the flouting of mask requirements and confirmed that she was working with divisional and district officers to address the issue.

== Statistics ==
=== Cumulative cases, recoveries and deaths ===
Cumulative Cases, Deaths and Recoveries
(last updated 18 October 2021)
View source data.

Cases Recovered Deaths Active cases (Note: The number of active cases is the number of total confirmed minus the number of recoveries and deaths.)

View source data.
Cumulative COVID-19 deaths in Fiji

=== Daily cases, active cases and deaths ===
View source data.
Daily COVID-19 cases in Fiji
View source data.
Daily COVID-19 deaths in Fiji
View source data.
Daily active COVID-19 cases in Fiji

==== Daily 7-day average of confirmed cases during the second wave ====
View source data.
Daily 7-day average of COVID-19 cases in Fiji

== Testing ==
Testing began on 28 January 2020 where samples were sent to the Victorian Infectious Disease Reference Laboratory (VIDRL) in Melbourne, Australia. Local testing began on 11 March 2020 at the Fiji Center for Disease Control.

As of 27 June 2021, Fiji has conducted 190,822 tests with a 7-day average daily test positivity of 7.4% and 3.3 tests per 1,000 population. Testing has increased significantly in response to the local transmission cases first confirmed in mid April 2021.

Testing conducted per month
(last updated 27 June 2021)
View source data.

No of test per month No of test (cumulative)

== Vaccinations efforts ==
On 11 February 2021, Fiji approved access to the Oxford–AstraZeneca COVID-19 vaccine for its national COVID-19 vaccination programme. On 7 March, Fiji received its first stocks of the AstraZeneca vaccines. On 9 July, Fiji approved the use of the Moderna COVID-19 vaccine for individuals age 18 and above as well as pregnant women. On 10 September, the Ministry of Health confirmed that they were planning to vaccinate its younger population between age 12 to 17 with the Moderna and Pfizer BioNTech COVID-19 vaccine. Vaccination is mandated however only to the adult population.

=== Vaccine rollout ===
As of 10 October 2021, 594,872 Fijians (96.2% of the targeted population of 618,173 individuals) have received their first dose of the AstraZeneca vaccine while 496,091 individuals have been fully vaccinated (two doses). For children aged 15 to 17, more than 25,000 students have received their first dose.

COVID-19 vaccine roll-out plan
Group	Priority group	Progress
1	Frontline workers	In Progress
2	Healthcare workers	In Progress
3	RFMF officers	In Progress
4	Fiji Police Force officers	In Progress
5	Hotel workers - especially those in quarantine facilities	In Progress
6	Tourism Industry workers in general	In Progress
7	Elderly population	In Progress
8	Population with underlying medical conditions	In Progress
9	General population	In Progress

COVID-19 vaccine roll-out per division for individuals above the age of 18 as of 21 September 2021
Division	First dose administered	Second dose administered	Population received first dose	Population received second dose
Central	259,755	191,790	92.2%	68.1%
Western	219,108	157,802	96.8%	69.7%
Northern	78,045	50,226	89.4%	57.6%
Eastern	19,849	7,861	89.4%	57.6%
Fiji	576,757	407,679	93.3%	65.9%

== See also ==
- COVID-19 pandemic by country
- COVID-19 pandemic in Oceania
- James Fong
- careFIJI
