= Responses to the COVID-19 pandemic in January 2022 =

Aspect of viral disease pandemic

This article documents the chronology of the response to the COVID-19 pandemic in January 2022, which originated in Wuhan, China in December 2019. Some developments may become known or fully understood only in retrospect. Reporting on this pandemic began in December 2019.

== Reactions and measures in the Americas ==
=== 13 January ===
- The Supreme Court of the United States (SCOTUS) has blocked United States President Joe Biden's vaccine and testing mandate for workplaces with at least 100 workers by a 6-3 majority. In addition, the Supreme Court upheld a vaccine mandate for healthcare workers at hospitals, nursing homes and other facilities participating in Medicare and Medicaid programs by a 5-4 majority.

== Reactions and measures in the Eastern Mediterranean ==
=== 7 January ===
- The Israeli Health Ministry has eliminated its "red list" of countries with high-infection rates on the grounds that travel bans have failed to stop the spread of the SARS-CoV-2 Omicron variant domestically.

== Reactions and measures in Europe ==
=== 16 January ===
- The French Parliament has approved several new measures to combat COVID-19 including requiring people to have a vaccine pass to enter public places such as restaurants, cafes, cinemas and long-distance trains.

== Reactions and measures in South, East and Southeast Asia ==
=== 4 January ===
The Chinese city of Yuzhou has entered into a lockdown following the discovery of three asymptomatic cases.

=== 12 January ===
- Malaysian Health Minister Khairy Jamaluddin confirmed that travellers entering the country who are fully vaccinated and have previously contracted Covid-19 do not need to undergo mandatory quarantine.

=== 19 January ===
- Malaysian National Unity Minister Halimah Mohamed Sadique announced that house visits and family reunions would be allowed for Chinese New Year. While open houses would not be allowed, functions could proceed on an invitation basis.

=== 21 January ===
- Health Minister Khairy announced that travelers who had received their booster doses would only be required to undergo a five day quarantine period from 24 January.

== Reactions and measures in the Western Pacific ==
=== 2 January ===
- The Fijian Health Ministry's Permanent Secretary Dr James Fong confirmed that the Government would be avoiding "population blanket" measures such as lockdowns to combat the third wave of COVID-19, citing their adverse impact on the community. Instead, the Fijian Government would be focusing on vaccination, masking, physical distancing, social gathering limits, and hand hygiene.

=== 4 January ===
- The Fijian Health Ministry revised the country's quarantine and isolation policies to require COVID-19 positive healthcare workers to self-isolate for seven days before resuming work.

=== 9 January ===
- The Fijian Minister for Trade and Commerce Faiyaz Koya has announced that informal gatherings in homes, communities, and community halls would be limited to 20 people from 10 January. In addition, the Ministry of Commerce, Trade, Tourism and Transport (MCTTT) introduced several new fines to counter the Omicron variant including fines for individuals failing to wear face masks and fines for businesses failing to maintain records or have QR codes for scanning.
- Queensland Premier Annastacia Palaszczuk has delayed the reopening of schools in the Australian state of Queensland until 7 February due to rising Omicron cases.

=== 10 January ===
- Kiribati reopened its borders to international travellers, which had been closed since March 2020.

=== 17 January ===
- The New Zealand Government launched its vaccination drive of children aged between five and 11 years old. That same day, Prime Minister Jacinda Ardern announced that the country would move to a red traffic light setting in response to Omicron community transmissions.

=== 18 January ===
- COVID-19 Response Minister Chris Hipkins postponed the next MIQ (Managed Isolation and Quarantine) lottery due to an increase in imported Omicron cases.

=== 19 January ===
- Following an outbreak resulting from a commercial flight, the Kiribati Government imposed a nationwide curfew and mandated the wearing of face masks.

=== 20 January ===
- The New Zealand Government lowered the Northland Region's traffic light setting from red to orange in response to rising vaccination rates.

=== 22 January ===
- Kiribati entered into a four-day nationwide lockdown following confirmed COVID-19 community transmissions. In addition, a 24-hour curfew was imposed on non-essential services, with exceptions being made for essential food providers.
- In response to an outbreak at the border, the Samoan Government imposed a 48-hour lockdown on the country from 6pm on Friday (21 January) to Monday (24 January). Under this state of emergency, all residents except for essential workers were required to stay at home. Businesses, schools and restaurants were closed while travel and mass gatherings were banned.

=== 23 January ===
- The New Zealand Government placed the entire country under a red traffic light setting from 11:59 pm that night in response to Omicron community cases in the Nelson, New Zealand–Marlborough Region.

=== 25 January ===
- The New Zealand Government has announced that workers covered by the country's vaccine mandate will be required to wear surgical-grade or N95 face masks instead of cloth face masks and improvised masks such as scarfs, bandannas, and T-shirts.
- Samoan Prime Minister Fiame Naomi Mata'afa extended Samoa's lockdown until 27 January after five frontline nurses tested positive for COVID-19. In addition, the Government allowed certain businesses and services including petrol and cashpower outlets, banks, money transfer services, and chemists to open for limited hours between 8am and 2 pm.

=== 28 January ===
- The Kiribati Government extended the country's lockdown for another week in response to rising community cases.

=== 29 January ===
- The Samoan Government lifted the country's lockdown due to a lack of community transmission. Workplaces and businesses will be allowed to reopen while public gatherings will be limited to 30 people. Only cargo flights will be allowed to enter Samoa.

== See also ==
- Timeline of the COVID-19 pandemic in January 2022
- Responses to the COVID-19 pandemic
