= COVID-19 vaccination in Fiji =

Ongoing COVID-19 vaccine program in Fiji

COVID-19 Vaccination Program
- Date: March 2021 – present
- Location: Fiji
- Cause: COVID-19 pandemic
- Target: Immunisation of Fiji against COVID-19
- Organised by: Government of Fiji, Ministry of Health and Medical Services
- Participants: 618,173 individuals who are above the age of 18 as well as children aged 12 to 17.
- Outcome: Adults (18 years+); 604,488 of the target population of 618,173 has received at least one dose. 97.8%; 569,791 of the target population of 618,173 has been fully vaccinated. 92.2%; Children (ages 14 to 17); 58,360 of the target population has received at least one dose.; 40,166 of the target population has been fully vaccinated.
- Vaccines deployed: Oxford–AstraZeneca COVID-19 vaccine; Moderna COVID-19 vaccine (also for booster shots); Pfizer–BioNTech COVID-19 vaccine
- Website: health.gov.fj/covid-vaccine

The COVID-19 vaccination campaign began in Fiji on the first quarter of 2021 and will continue throughout the year with the goal of vaccinating all eligible Fijians. The government has made it mandatory for all eligible adults to take the COVID-19 vaccines.

Fiji received its vaccines through the COVAX facility and bilateral contributions by the United States, Australia, New Zealand, India and Japan. More than a million doses have been administered in Fiji.

== History ==
=== 2020 ===
In early June 2020, the Government of Australia ensured Fiji's access to a COVID-19 vaccine through GAVI at an affordable price. Australia also invested in $500 million in the next three years to ensure that the countries of the Pacific including Fiji will be able to achieve full immunization coverage. Attorney General Aiyaz Sayed Khaiyum said that the government is working with International Agencies to ensure that COVID-19 vaccines are not commercialized.

=== January–March 2021 ===
In January 2021, Australia and Fiji discussed vaccine options with the Australian Government indicating that if 80% of Fiji's population are vaccinated, chances of a travel bubble are high between the two nations. The Ministry of Health and Medical Services trained its staff for COVID-19 vaccination as the country is working to register all receivers planned for the first phase of vaccination. Vaccination are expected to begin in the first quarter of 2021 and throughout the year.

In February 2021, Fiji approved the use of the AstraZeneca vaccine with the COVAX Facility committed in providing over 100,000 doses.

In early March 2021, Fiji became the first Pacific country to receive the first batch of vaccines from the World Health Organization's COVAX initiative. Fiji received 12,000 doses of the AstraZeneca vaccine, with the first six thousand earmarked for frontline and essential workers. On 7 March, Fiji received its first stocks of the AstraZeneca vaccines. On 19 April 2021, Fiji received its second batch of the AstraZeneca vaccines.

=== July 2021 ===
By 5 July, 54% of the target population of 650,000 had received one dose of the AstraZeneca vaccine while nine percent were now fully vaccinated. On 6 July 2021, the Suva City Council along with the Ministry of Health launched its first ever drive-through vaccination at Albert Park. On 8 July 2021, Prime Minister Frank Bainimarama in a video address announced that taking the COVID-19 vaccines will be mandatory to all eligible Fijians adding that "Fiji had taken an oath of no jab, no job." Fiji also approved the use of the Moderna COVID-19 vaccine with the support of the United States under the COVAX facility for individuals 18 years and above as well as pregnant women.

On 27 July 2021, outer-islands of Rotuma, Yasawa and Lakeba received their COVID-19 vaccines enabling them to begin with their vaccination program. By 3 August, 82.6% of the target population (roughly 484,629) have received their first dose while 24.6% (roughly 144,194) have received their second dose.

=== August 2021 ===
On 22 August 2021, Prime Minister Frank Bainimarama in a video address to the nation announced that a vaccine lottery will be launched to encourage the public to get vaccinated. Meanwhile, 40% of the target population have been fully vaccinated which prompted the government to move the curfew back by an hour with the new curfew starting from 7:00 p.m to 4:00 a.m. On 4 September, the curfew was renewed with the new curfew starting from 8:00 p.m to 4:00 a.m as more than 50% of the target population has been fully vaccinated.

=== September 2021 ===
In early September, The Guardian reported that Fijian health authorities were sending teams of doctors, nurses, health workers, and civil servants on horseback to deliver vaccines to isolated communities in the highlands of Fiji.

On 10 September 2021, the Fijian Ministry of Health confirmed that it was planning to vaccinate children under the age of 18 years. Permanent Secretary for Health Dr James Fong said that the Government would begin vaccinating young people between the ages of 16 and 18 years old. The planned vaccination of children would involve a stringent process to ensure that parental or guardian consent is secured and online registration prior to vaccination. The Pfizer–BioNTech COVID-19 vaccine will be priotised for the campaign.

On 13 September 2021, Fijian Prime Minister Voreqe Bainimarama expressed concern that 15,866 individuals living in the villages along the Kings and Queens Highway had not been vaccinated, based on figures compiled by the Ministry of iTaukei Affairs.

On 20 September, the Fiji Police Force terminated the contracts of 13 staff members (11 police officers and two civilians) for refusing to get vaccinated under its "no jab, no job" policy.

By 21 September, 5,000 students had registered to be vaccinated with the COVID-19 vaccine. That same day, the Republic of Fiji Military Forces adopted a "no jab, no job" policy, with staff who refuse to receive a COVID-19 vaccine being issued with termination notices.

On 22 September, Permanent Secretary for Health Dr Fong confirmed that 588,599 adults (95.2%) had received their first vaccine dose while 398,077 (64.4%) had received their second doses. The following day, Dr Fong announced a new vaccination target population for adults aged 18 years and over at 618,173. For large urban and peri-urban areas, a 63% target was also set.

On 25 September, Methodist Church of Fiji and Rotuma General Secretary Reverend Iliesa Naivalu announced that partially vaccinated church ministers would not be able to attend any church engagements in order to combat the spread of COVID-19 within the community.

On 29 September, the Ministry of Education, Heritage and Arts urged teachers to get vaccinated. By 24 September, 4,669 Education Ministry staff had been fully vaccinated while 8,524 others had received their first jab.

By 30 September, the Ministry of Health had terminated 50 staff who had refused to vaccinate including nurses, doctors, health inspectors and other workers. That same day, Permanent Secretary of Health Dr Fong allowed unvaccinated people to attend religious gatherings outdoors. Children are also allowed in spaces where fully vaccinated adults are gathered.

=== October 2021 ===
By 2 October, 17,996 teenagers between the ages of 15 and 17 years had received their first dose of the Moderna vaccine.

As of 3 October, 593,442 Fijian adults have received their first dose of the vaccine and 462,441 have received their second doses as of 3 October. By that date, 96% of adults have received at least one dose, and 74.8% have been fully vaccinated nationwide.

By 4 October, 74.8% of the eligible population had received their second dose. Once 80% of the population has been vaccinated, the Fijian Government intends to ease curfew and business restrictions.

On 6 October, the Ministry of Commerce confirmed that it was rolling out a mandatory VAX-check tool for high-risk businesses to verify the vaccination status of people, in addition to other COVID-19 safety measures.

By 7 October, 96.1% of adults had received at least one vaccine dose while 77.4% had been fully vaccinated nationwide.

By 8 October, 78.3% of adult Fijians (484,195 people) had been fully vaccinated while 96.2% of adults (594,542 people) had received one dose.

On 9 October, the Ministry of Economy announced that only individuals who have received both doses of the COVID-19 vaccine by 31 October can qualify for the $360 Unemployment Assistance.

On 19 October, Health Minister Ifereimi Waqainabete confirmed that the Health Ministry had ramped up vaccination efforts in the outer islands, particularly the Lau Islands, Kadavu Group, Lomaiviti Islands, Mamanuca Islands, and Yasawa Islands.

On 28 October, Fiji's full vaccination rate reached 86.5%. The Government aims to reach a fully vaccinated rate of 90% by 11 November 2021.

=== November 2021 ===
On 2 November, the Health Ministry confirmed that they would be rolling out the Pfizer COVID-19 vaccine to children between the ages of 12 and 15 years from 15 November. On the same day, the Fiji Broadcasting Corporation achieved its 100 percent vaccination target with its staff.

By 13 November, 89.5% (553,096) of the eligible Fijian population had been vaccinated while 96.9% (599,189) of the eligible population had received at least one dose.

On 15 November, the Fijian Government rolled out its Pfizer vaccination campaign for children between the ages of 12 and 14 years. On 17 November, Dr. Fong confirmed there were no immediate plans to vaccinate children in the maritime regions with the Pfizer vaccine since the vaccine stocks have to be stored in ultra-cold temperatures as low as -90 °C.

By 19 November, 90% (556,322) of the eligible Fijian population had been fully vaccinated. In addition, 97.1% of the population had received their first dose. As a result, the national nighttime curfew was moved back by one hour from 11pm to 12 am.

By 22 November, 99.4% of teachers had been fully vaccinated. The Education Ministry also confirmed that it had terminated 130 teachers the previous month for refusing to get vaccinated.

By 27 November, 90.6% of the eligible population had been fully vaccinated. 97.3% (601,212) of the population have received their first dose.

From 30 November, the Fijian Government began rolling out Moderna COVID-19 vaccine booster shots to frontline workers and vulnerable Fijians.

=== December 2021 ===
On 23 December, Permanent Secretary for Health Doctor Fong announced that Fijians over the age of 18 years were eligible to receive the booster short of the Moderna COVID-19 vaccine.

=== January 2022 ===
On 4 January, the Fijian Health Ministry confirmed that the COVID-19 vaccine booster campaign would continue until all stocks had been exhausted. The Ministry also confirmed that more booster doses are scheduled to arrive in the country by the end of the month.

On 13 January, the Health Ministry reported a shortage of booster doses. Dr Fong confirmed that 142,240 people were eligible to receive their booster shot in January but that the country had only 100,000 doses of the Moderna COVID-19 vaccine.

On 14 January, Dr Fong attributed the low hospitalisation rate to Fiji's high vaccination rate. As of that date, 205 COVID-19 patients were in hospital.

=== February 2022 ===
On 1 February, Dr Fong acknowledged that the Health Ministry was having difficulty in procuring sufficient stocks of the pediatric version of the COVID-19 Pfizer vaccine. He explained that agents bought millions of stocks of Pfizer vaccines not just for Fiji but other overseas countries for sustainability purposes. As of 1 February, 21,640 children between the ages of 12 and 14 have received their first dose while 10,657 have been fully vaccinated.

On 2 February, Fiji received 175,000 doses of Pfizer vaccine doses with the assistance of Australia, New Zealand and UNICEF. This was the first batch in a shipment of half a million Pfizer doses due to reach Fiji in 2022.

On 3 February, the Health Ministry confirmed that the booster vaccine and vaccination for children were not mandatory but encouraged all eligible individuals to be vaccinated or get a booster dose.

By 22 February, Dr Fong confirmed that Fiji had used up its current stocks of AstraZeneca doses. With new AstraZeneca doses scheduled to arrive in six weeks, the Health Ministry would continue to deploy Moderna and Pfizer vaccines as primary doses for children and adults, and booster doses for adults.

On 24 February, Fiji received its second batch of the Pfizer vaccine from Australia, which amounted to 175,000 doses. These vaccines will be used to support the country's booster rollout and to vaccinate children over the age of 12. That same day, Dr Fong announced that the Fijian Government would prioritise the rollout of booster shots using the Pfizer vaccine.

=== March 2022 ===
By 17 March, the Health Ministry had confirmed that 112,295 individuals had received booster shots via the Moderna and Pfizer vaccines.

By 19 March, the Health Ministry confirmed that 113,453 individuals had received booster shots.

By 22 March, 87% of the population aged 12 years and over had been vaccinated.

On 31 March, the Fijian Government accepted a New Zealand offer to supply 50,000 doses of the Pfizer pediatric vaccine.

=== April 2022 ===
By 2 April, 581,666 Fijians (or 94.1% of the population) had been fully vaccinated.

== Challenges ==
=== Public response to mandatory vaccination ===
The Fijian Government's decision to make vaccination compulsory for public servants drew criticism for violating civil liberties and government overreach from senior civil servant Ana, Fiji Trade Union Congress (FTUC) general secretary Felix Anthony, and lawyer Filimoni Vosarogo. Vosarogo warned that certain provisions in the Fijian constitution made it unconstitutional for vaccination to be made a condition of employment, potentially raising civil liberties issues. The Fiji Law Society released a statement concerned at the legal implications of the government's policy adding that "health is important, but so are people's legal rights that ensure Fiji remains a free and democratic society." The society also highlighted that unfair discrimination is prohibited under the constitution and added that the policy may not be fair in other circumstances.

On the other hand, the Young Entrepreneurs Council supported the Government's policy adding that it is important for the country's economy that depended on tourism to recover and to allow operations to resume safely.

=== Misinformation and conspiracy theories ===
A complaint was lodged to the Fiji Police Force regarding the legality of the COVID-19 vaccination. The complainant who is an assistant lecturer in the College of Medicine, Nursing, and Health Sciences for FNU uploaded a video on social media claiming that "there is no virus except for what is in the vaccine". The Fiji National University responded by taking immediate and appropriate action against the individual stating that the "Curriculum content must always be based on full facts" adding that the university reject all misinformation, unfounded conspiracy theories, and fake news.

The Fiji Police Force also investigated a viral video involving police officers in uniform claiming that the vaccines contained a metallic chip which attracted magnets. The Ministry of Health and the Fiji Medical Association debunked those claims stating that the vaccine dose is too small to have the chip.

=== Vaccine fraud ===
In November 2021, FBC News reported that there were reports of people using fake vaccination cards to access public services over the past two months. In response, the Health Ministry announced that it would be investigating civil servants involved in COVID-19 vaccination fraud.

=== Vaccine wastage ===
In mid November 2021, Health Permanent Secretary Doctor James Fong confirmed that the Health Ministry had to deal with vaccine wastage during their vaccine drive. These have included instances of only one or two people turning up to vaccination centres; since one vial can be used to vaccinate ten people.

== Vaccine rollout ==
As of 10 October 2021, 594,872 Fijians (96.2% of the targeted population of 618,173 individuals) have received their first dose of the AstraZeneca vaccine while 496,091 individuals have been fully vaccinated (two doses). For children aged 15 to 17, more than 25,000 students have received their first dose.

COVID-19 vaccine roll-out plan
Group	Priority group	Progress
1	Frontline workers	In Progress
2	Healthcare workers	In Progress
3	RFMF officers	In Progress
4	Fiji Police Force officers	In Progress
5	Hotel workers - especially those in quarantine facilities	In Progress
6	Tourism Industry workers in general	In Progress
7	Elderly population	In Progress
8	Population with underlying medical conditions	In Progress
9	General population	In Progress

COVID-19 vaccine roll-out per division for individuals above the age of 18 as of 21 September 2021
Division	First dose administered	Second dose administered	Population received first dose	Population received second dose
Central	259,755	191,790	92.2%	68.1%
Western	219,108	157,802	96.8%	69.7%
Northern	78,045	50,226	89.4%	57.6%
Eastern	19,849	7,861	89.4%	57.6%
Fiji	576,757	407,679	93.3%	65.9%

== Adverse events ==
The Ministry of Health and Medical Services recorded 56 events related to adverse effects after immunisation. Out of the events, 5 cases were considered serious. However per investigation, Permanent Secretary for Health James Fong announced that the cases were not linked to vaccination.

== Public opinion ==
In early September 2021, the non-governmental organisation Dialogue Fiji released the results of a public opinion survey on COVID-19 vaccination that it had conducted between 25 June and 10 July that year. The survey found that 53.9% of the 1,067 respondents believed that the vaccine was "very safe" while 19.4 percent reported the vaccines to be "little safe" and "not safe at all." Within the vaccine hesitant group, 50% cited a fear of side effects; 36% believed that vaccines were unsafe; 17% believed that vaccines had metal chips, were connected to 5G or were magnetic; and 10% cited religious reasons.

Within ethnic groups, Dialogue Fiji's survey found that 84.1% of Indo-Fijians, 69.4% of Rotumans and 52% of iTaukei were willing to be vaccinated. Dialogue Fiji also found that Muslims (88.65) and Hindus (83.4%) were more receptive to getting vaccinated than Christians (59.25%) who were more likely to be "vaccine hesitant" (14.8%). The study found that Christian religious leaders and influencers had promoted conspiracy theories about COVID-19 vaccines being the "mark of the Beast" and demonic potions on major social media platforms including Facebook, TikTok, Instagram and YouTube.

== See also ==
- COVID-19 vaccine distribution by country and territory
