= Mereseini Vuniwaqa =

Fijian politician (born 1974)

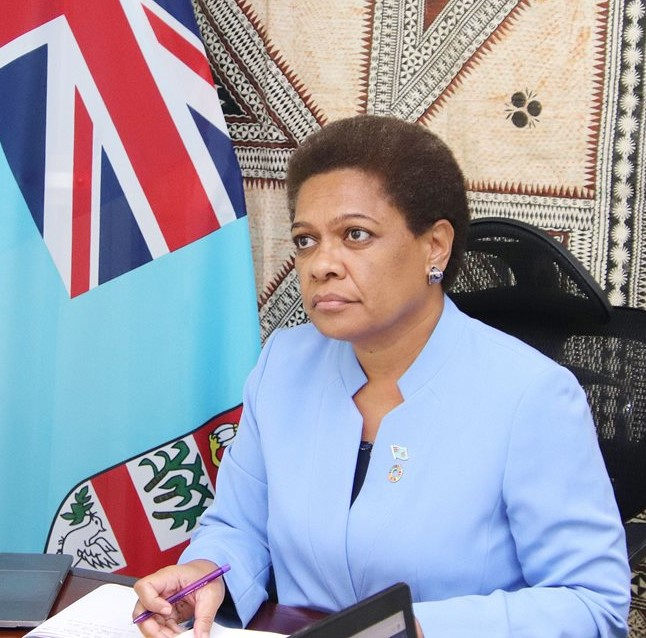

Minister for Women, Children and Poverty Alleviation
- In office September 2016 – August 2021
- Prime Minister: Frank Bainimarama
- Preceded by: Rosy Akbar

Minister for Lands and Mineral Resources
- In office September 2014 – September 2016

Personal details
- Born: 18 June 1974 (age 52) Vanua Levu, Fiji
- Children: 1 son and 2 daughters
- Education: University of Tasmania (LLB); Australian National University (Legal Practice)

Mereseini Rakuita Vuniwaqa (born 18 June 1974) is a Fijian politician, who served as the Minister for Women, Children and Poverty Alleviation from 2016 until her resignation from the Fiji First Party in 2021. In November 2021, she was appointed as the Global Chair of the Family Planning 2030.

Prior to her resignation, Vuniwaqa was first elected as a Member of Parliament in 2014 and appointed to Cabinet, holding the portfolio for the Ministry for Lands and Mineral Resources, becoming the first Fijian woman appointed to the position. As one of the most senior and influential Cabinet ministers, she has been appointed on various occasions as an Acting Prime Minister on behalf of the Prime Minister in his absences overseas. Vuniwaqa is the first Fijian woman appointed as chair of the Telecommunications Authority of Fiji in 2008, Acting Permanent Secretary for Justice and Anti-corruption in 2012 and Acting Supervisor of elections and also served as a State Solicitor for the Office of the Attorney General.

In 2021, Vuniwaqa was one of the top candidates shortlisted to succeed Phumzile Mlambo-Ngcuka as the executive director of the UN Women, alongside Kang Kyung-wha of South Korea, Sima Sami Bahous of Jordan, Anita Bhatia of India and Radhika Coomaraswamy of Sri Lanka, the post eventually went to Bahous.

In 2019, she was elected to chair the Asia-Pacific Ministerial Conference on the Beijing+25 Review where over 500 Ministers, senior policy makers, UN officials, civil society, youth, and private sector representatives from across Asia and the Pacific region gathered at UNESCAP in Bangkok to support accelerated progress on gender equality and women's empowerment. She also chaired, the Asia-Pacific 8th intergovernmental and regional forum on Sustainable Development, organized by UNESCAP in March 2021 under the theme "Sustainable and resilient recovery from the COVID-19 pandemic in Asia and the Pacific" which included virtual participation of over 1,000 senior government officials and stakeholders.

== Early life and education ==
Vuniwaqa was born in Vanua Levu Island, Fiji. She attended Savusavu District School and Sigatoka Methodist High School. She graduated from the University of Tasmania with a Bachelor of Laws and holds a postgraduate diploma in Legal Practice from the Australian National University.

== Professional career ==
Vuniwaqa was admitted as a Barrister and Solicitor of the Supreme Court of Barrister the Australian Capital Territory in 1997 and Barrister and Solicitor of the High Court of Fiji and Commissioner for Oaths of the High Court of Fiji in 1998. She joined the Office of the Attorney General of Fiji as a junior legal officer in 1998 until her appointment in 2009-2013 as the State Solicitor where she served as the highest ranked female legal advisor to the government of Fiji. Vuniwaqa was appointed in 2012 as the Acting Permanent Secretary for Justice and Anti Corruption where she spearheaded Fiji's first ever Electronic Voter Registration (EVR) exercise that led to registration of over 80% of Fijian voters over a 3-month period. EVR was introduced to ensure voter identification and elimination of voter frauds.

In 2013, she did hold the position of the Acting Permanent Secretary for Communications for a short period. Vuniwaqa has served between 2008 and 2013 as the Chairperson of Telecommunications Authority of Fiji, National Anti-Money Laundering Council and National Working Group on Copyright.

== Political career (2014–present) ==
In 2014, Vuniwaqa entered Fijian politics as a candidate for the Fiji First and was elected first to the Parliament in the 2014 election. She was re-elected to the Parliament in the 2018 election.

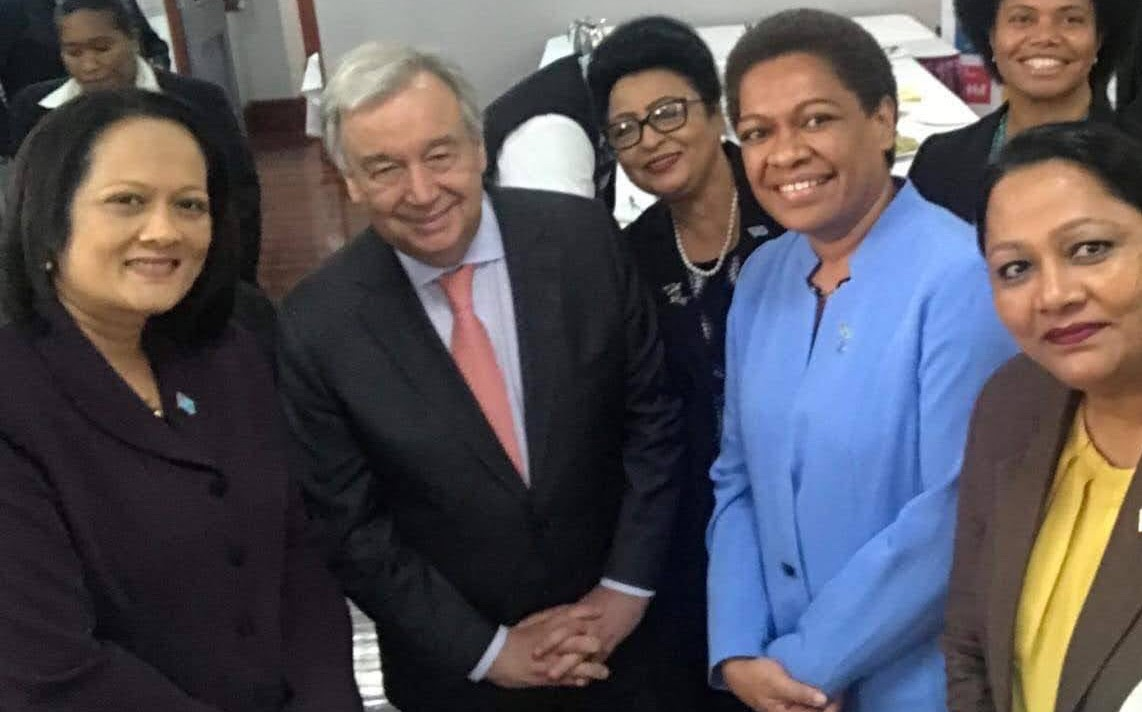
Vuniwaqa and Rosy Akbar, Premila Kumar, Veena Bhatnagar with the UN Secretary-General António Guterres,2019

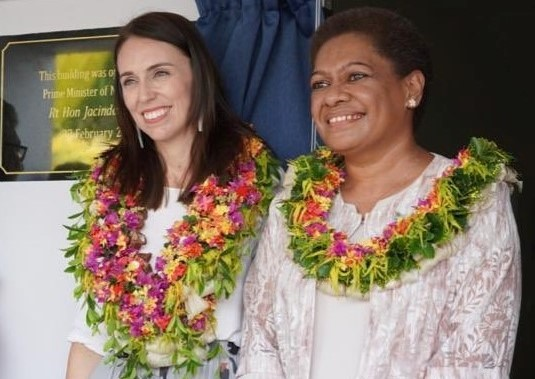
Vuniwaqa with New Zealand Prime Minister, Jacinda Ardern,2020

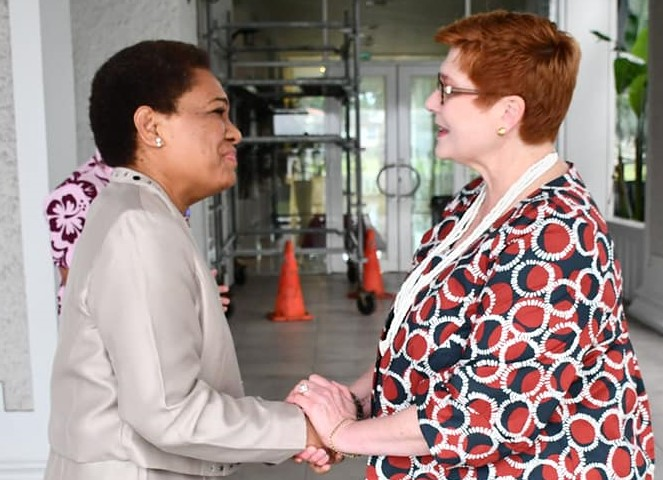
Vuniwaqa with Australian Foreign Affairs Minister Marise Payne,2019

=== Ministry of Land and Mineral Resources (2014-2016). ===
In September 2014, Vuniwaqa was appointed to Cabinet by the Prime Minister as the Minister for Lands and Mineral Resources, becoming the first Fijian woman appointed to the position. In 2015, Vuniwaqa facilitated and received Cabinet approval for the upgrade of the Fiji Geodetic Datum to a more current internationally recognized system. This was instigated following the adoption of the United Nations General Assembly resolution on Global Geodetic Reference Frame for Sustainable Development in February 2015 which was led by the Republic of Fiji.

=== Ministry of Women, Children and Poverty Alleviation (2016 to present) ===
In a Cabinet reshuffle in September 2016, Vuniwaqa was appointed as the Minister for Women, Children and Poverty Alleviation, a portfolio that she continues to hold since her re-election in 2018. In this position, Vuniwaqa has introduced and rolled out a number of strategic and key reforms with an unprecedented whole of government spotlight on advancing gender equality as well as strengthening the Fijian social protection delivery system and the relevant policy setting which attracted significant international assistance.

In March 2018, Vuniwaqa launched the development and roll-out of the Service Delivery Protocol (SDP) to improve referral and coordination of response services for survivors of gender-based violence (GBV) to ensure GBV survivors' access to more timely and better coordinated quality response services, particularly those living in rural and remote areas."The initiative focusses on the development of interagency, multi-sectoral national Standard Operating Procedures for response, referral and coordination of gender-based violence (GBV) services."

In January 2020, Vuniwaqa announced that Fiji embark on an historic mission to develop a National Action Plan (NAP) to Prevent Violence Against all Women and Girls (2021-2026), making it the first Pacific Island Country, and one of the only two countries globally along with Australia, to have a whole of government and whole of community, inclusive, evidence-based approach to prevent violence against women and girls. Fiji is at present in the national consultation phase. The national consultation aims to consult with at least 2,500 women, men and youth in all their diversities from across the 13 settings and sectors. NAP is expected to be developed in December 2021.

In 2021, Vuniwaqa sought and received Cabinet approvals for the development of the Fiji Country Gender Assessment (CGA)- the first in the Pacific as well as a Gender Transformative Institutional Capacity Development initiative (ICD). The Fiji Country Gender Assessment intends to inform on the status of all women and girls in Fiji and provide a comprehensive overview of gender issues in various sectors and critical areas. The CGA is expected to be completed by December 2021. The Gender Transformative Institutional Capacity Development initiative aims to create an enabling environment to ensure integration of all women and girls' needs, interests, concerns, contributions and perspectives into policies, strategies, programs and budgets with the establishment of effective coordination mechanisms as well as enhancing technical knowledge, competence and resources on transformative gender mainstreaming across government institutions. In an official press statement in 2020, Vuniwaqa highlighted that a gender transformative approach requires looking beyond the symptoms of gender inequality but addressing the underlying causes rooted in discriminatory gender social norms and behaviors and unequal power relations.

=== Resignation from party ===
On 6 August 2021, Vuniwaqa resigned from her party Fiji First citing "personal reasons and new opportunities". Following her vacant seat, she was replaced by Sachida Nand.
