= Tourism Fiji =

Destination marketing agency of Fiji

Agency overview
- Formed: 2004
- Jurisdiction: Fiji
- Annual budget: $22 million FJD (2021-22)
- Minister responsible: Viliame Gavoka, Deputy Prime Minister
- Agency executive: Brent Hill, Chief Executive Officer
- Parent department: Ministry of Commerce, Trade, Tourism and Transport
- Website: corporate.fiji.travel

Tourism Fiji is a Fijian government marketing agency responsible for promoting Fiji as a tourism destination abroad. Formerly known as the Fiji Visitors Bureau, the agency was established under the Tourism Fiji Act 2004 and is under the jurisdiction of the Ministry of Commerce, Trade, Tourism and Transport.

The agency's head office which is located in Nadi, also maintains a presence overseas to target markets mainly in Australia, New Zealand, United States, Asia and continental Europe.

== History ==
During the 20th century, the Fiji Visitors Bureau which was formerly known at the time was established by the Tourist Commission and Visitors Bureau Act of 1969 and was given the responsibility to promote Fiji as a tourism destination abroad. The agency now known as Tourism Fiji, established by the Tourism Fiji Act of 2004 took on the responsibility and has been ever since focusing mainly on marketing Fiji.

== Campaigns ==
In November 2021, Australian actress Rebel Wilson was chosen by Tourism Fiji as the face of a tourism campaign called 'Open for Happiness'. The campaign which was the first since the start of the COVID-19 pandemic in Fiji featured the actress welcoming tourists back as the country announced the opening of its borders that year.

== Controversy ==
In April 2018, Tourism Fiji released a promotional video where a poster referenced the word toilet as 'vale ni lotu'. The word which translates to church in the iTaukei language drew public outrage with many calling on the agency to take action against the person behind the video. The video was condemned by Opposition Leader Ro Teimumu Kepa adding that she was disgusted that Tourism Fiji would allow the video to be published. The agency later deleted the video and in a press statement apologised for the incident saying "Tourism Fiji takes full responsibility for the error and sincerely regrets any offence this post may have caused our fellow Fijians." The staff behind the video was terminated.
