= Tertiary Scholarship and Loans Service =

Fijian organization

- Headquarters: Level 1 Unit 36 - 37 Garden City Complex, Raiwai, Suva
- Board Chairperson: Ms. Ro Teimumu Kepa
- Deputy Board Chairperson: Ms. Penuel Emi
- Board of Directors: Ms. Kirti Patel; Mr. Nilesh Lal
- Affiliations: Government of Fiji; Ministry of Education
- Budget: $150.5 m FJD (2024-2025)
- Website: tsls.com.fj

The Tertiary Scholarships and Loans Service (TSLS) is a Statutory Institution established under the Tertiary Scholarship and Loans Act 2014 (“the Act”) to administer and implement Government funded scholarship, study loan and grant schemes . TSLS is responsible for ensuring transparent and accountable management of Government funding. In doing this, TSLS focuses on achieving demand led human capital development outcomes for Fiji.

== History ==
TSLS was established in 2014 and has assisted more than 50,000 Fijian students. Prime Minister Frank Bainimarama declared that the government will continue to play an important role in the education of students. As of March 2022, more than 12,000 students are currently on TSLS. TSLS has revealed that more than $500 million is owed by students and only $23 million has been paid back.

== Schemes ==
TSLS provides three schemes: Scholarships, Study Loan and Grants. Under the Scholarship scheme, TSLS provides local and overseas scholarships as well as for students with special needs. The Loan scheme is funded in the form of loans that are not normal debts. Since its establishment, the Government has paid out $1.2 billion for the schemes.

=== Scholarship ===
Also known as NTS (National Toppers Scholarship), these are fully funded scholarships for the top ranked students who have completed Year 13 (Thirteenth grade). To qualify, students should score 320/400 in the Fiji Year 13 Examination, however cut off marks vary in different prioritized areas. As of 2024, the total number of scholarships funded by the government is 480.

=== Loan ===
Also known as TELS (Tertiary Education Loans Scheme), these are funds in the form of loans which provides students with zero interest rates limited to the first Bachelor's degree. To qualify, students should score more than 280/400 in the Fiji Year 13 Examination. As of 2022, the total number of loan schemes funded is 7,000 spread out to Bachelor's degree and Academic certificate.

== See also ==
- Education in Fiji
