= Colonial War Memorial Hospital =

Hospital in Suva, Fiji

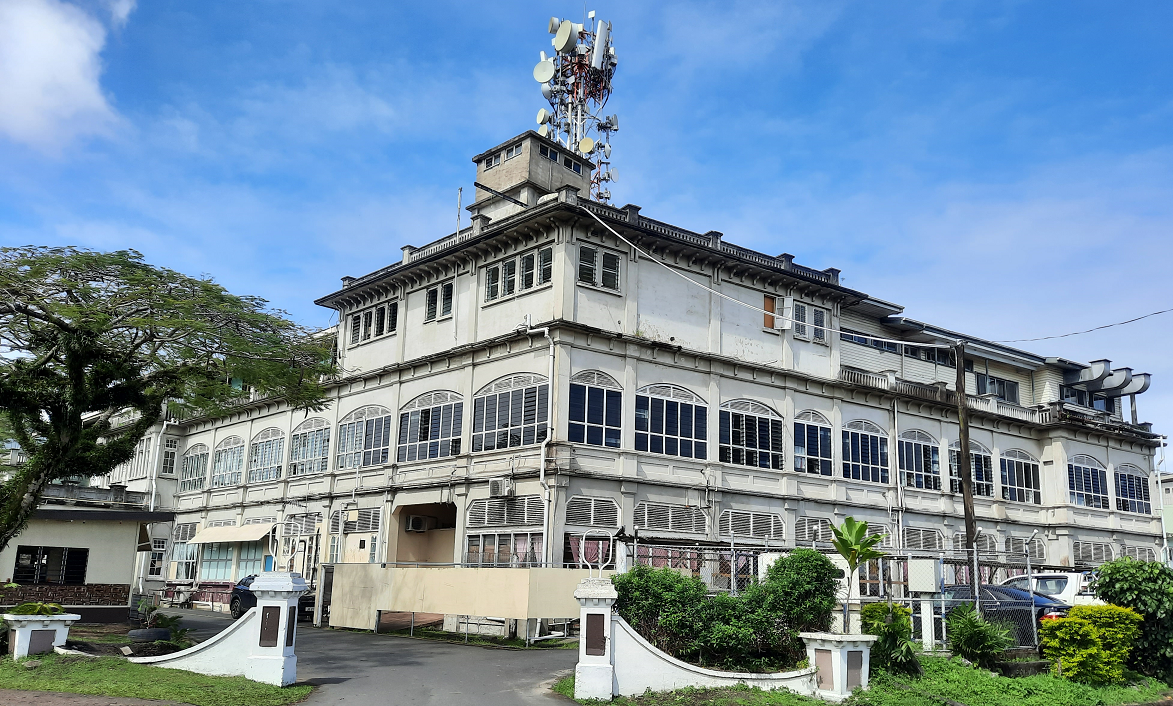

Geography
- Location: Brown street, Suva, Pacific, Fiji
- Coordinates: 18°8′5″S 178°26′1″E

Organisation
- Care system: Public
- Type: District General

Services
- Emergency department: Yes
- Beds: 500

Helipads
- Helipad: Yes

History
- Founded: 2 December 1923

Links
- Website: site
- Lists: Hospitals in Fiji

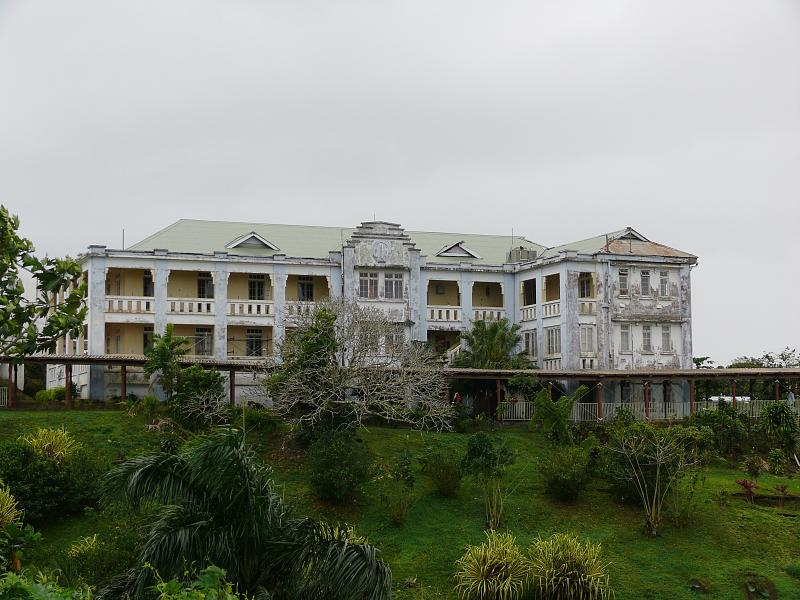
Old nurses quarters

The Colonial War Memorial Hospital is a district general hospital located in Suva, Fiji.

It was built and completed at the end of 1923. It was built with the assistance of £319,500. It replaced the Colonial Hospital which was first built in Levuka (the former capital of Fiji) and relocated to Walu Bay in Suva in 1894.

== Background ==
The hospital was the brainchild of Legislative Council member Henry Marks, who personally donated £5,000 towards its founding, and gave another £5,000 through his company. When it initially opened in 1923, it had 108 beds and 27 staff members of which 17 were European doctors and nurses and 10 were local nurses but today, it has a total of 1117 staff of which 133 are doctors, 534 are nurses, 173 paramedical and management staff and a support team of 277.

The Hospital also acts as a teaching hospital with students from Fiji School of Medicine and Fiji School of Nursing having campuses based at the hospital since 1928.

The hospital also served during the COVID-19 pandemic, treating patients who required intensive care hospitalization. On 6 June 2021, after reporting a record number of cases, the Ministry of Health sealed off the hospital for treatment of COVID-19 patients only.
