= Education in Fiji =

Primary school education in Fiji is compulsory, and subsidized for eight years. In 1978, the gross primary enrollment ratio was 113.5 percent, and the net primary enrollment rate was 97.7 percent. As of 2009, attendance was decreasing due to security concerns and the burden of school fees, often due to the cost of transport. In 2013, the Bainimarama government made education at the primary and secondary level in Fiji free for all students. Fiji has since achieved universal access to primary education.

The Ministry of Education in Fiji is taking major steps to subsidize the educational fees and other costs related to it and hence bringing it under the affordability of everyone.

The ministry is concerned about all the aspects of education, and it is putting all the efforts to judiciously allocate the educational resources to everybody and especially to the rural areas. Various education policies are formulated, and it highlights the primary areas like in-service training, personnel management along with the budgetary features.

The Fiji education system is taken care of by the government but most of the schools are managed either by the local committees. One can get admitted to the secondary schools by appearing in the competitive exams and the student has to pay a nominal fee, the balance being subsidized by the government.

At tertiary level, there are three universities in Fiji: Fiji National University, University of the South Pacific and University of Fiji. Fiji National University is the main public university and comprises the colleges of medicine, business, agriculture, humanities and engineering. It is also home to Fiji's National Productivity Organization and the Fiji Maritime Academy. The University of the South Pacific is a regional Pacific university, with campuses on a number of Pacific islands. Its main campus is in Suva. The University of Fiji was set up by a temple and is based in the West with a rising allocation from the subsidiary if ministry of education Fiji, heritage and arts.

Government has put in policies to try to improve ease of access to tertiary education by establishing the Tertiary Scholarship and Loan Service, intended to provide financing to Fijian students who have qualified for higher education in approved institutions of higher learning but are unable to support themselves financially, increasing equitable access to higher education in the country in line with the Fijian Government’s vision of “Building a Smarter Fiji”.

A subsidised bus fare scheme for primary and secondary students for those who come from families with a combined income of less than $15,000 was also rolled out by the government to ease access of being able to go to school, and was extended to those traveling by minibus, boats, and carriers. School fees were also removed to provide subsidised school education and improve education access for all Fiji children.

The Fiji Human Rights Measurement Initiative (FHRMI) finds that Fiji is fulfilling only 97.3% of what it should be fulfilling for the right to education based on the country's level of income. FHRMI breaks down the right to education by looking at the rights to both primary education and secondary education. While taking into consideration Fiji's income level, the nation is achieving 199.0% of what should be possible based on its resources (income) for primary school education but only 76.9% for secondary education.
