= Faiyaz Koya =

Fijian politician

The Honourable Faiyaz Koya
- فیاض کویا
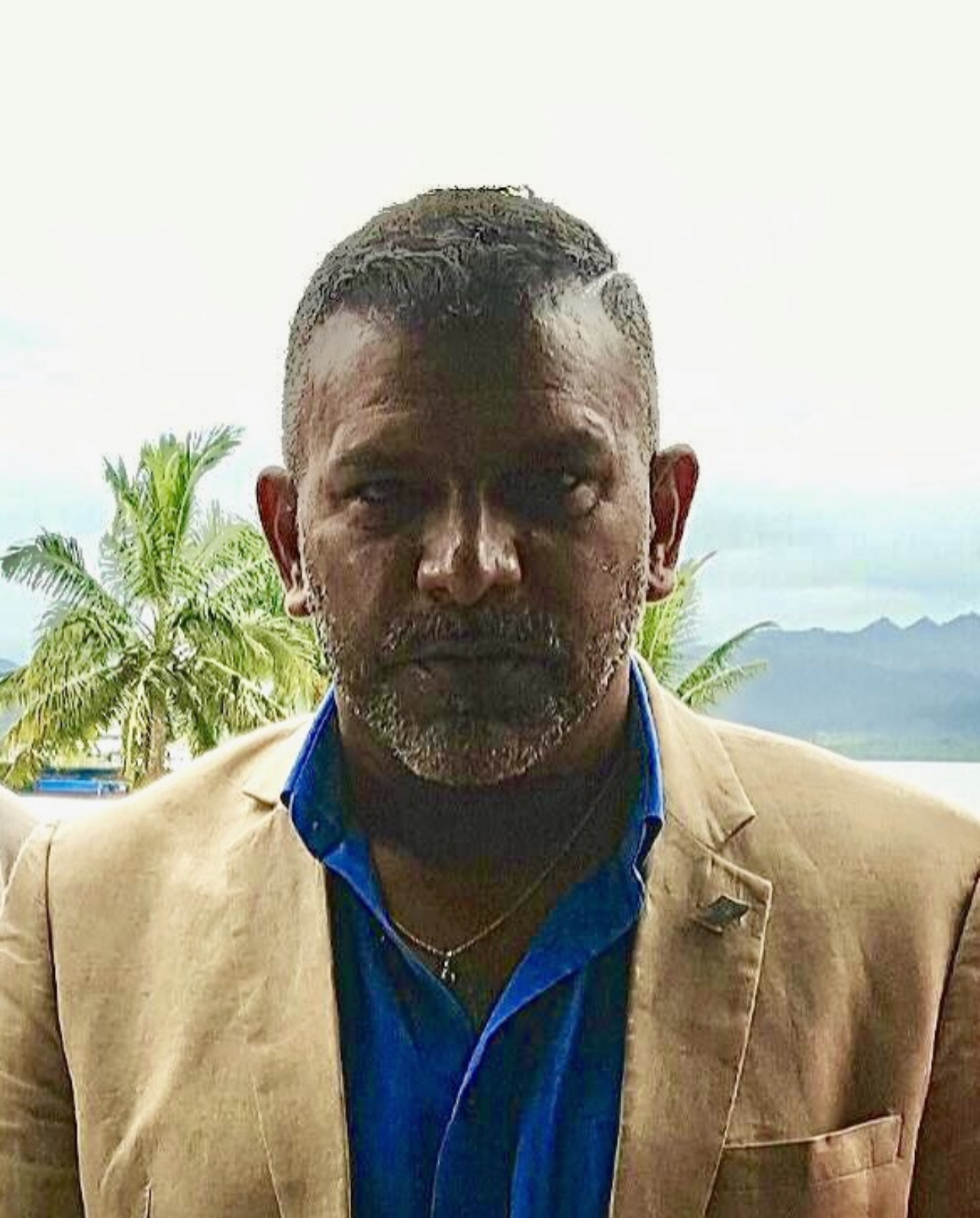
- Honourable Faiyaz Koya in 2023

Minister for Commerce, Trade, Tourism & Transport
- In office 16 April 2020 – 24 December 2022
- Prime Minister: Frank Bainimarama
- Succeeded by: Viliame Gavoka

34th Attorney General of Fiji
- In office 24 September 2014 – 6 October 2014
- President: Ratu Epeli Nailatikau
- Prime Minister: Frank Bainimarama
- Preceded by: Aiyaz Sayed-Khaiyum
- Succeeded by: Aiyaz Sayed-Khaiyum

Personal details
- Born: Faiyaz Koya; 7 March 1962 (age 64) Lautoka, Fiji
- Party: FijiFirst
- Children: 1 Son
- Parent: Sidiq Koya (father)
- Profession: Lawyer

Faiyaz Siddiq Koya is a Fijian politician and Member of the Parliament of Fiji. He served as Minister for Industry, Trade, Tourism, Lands & Mineral Resources from 2014 to 2018. In March 2020, Koya was awarded a Parliamentary seat. In April 2020, after Prime Minister Frank Bainimarama announced a cabinet reshuffle, Faiyaz Koya was appointed the portfolio of Minister for Commerce, Trade, Tourism and Transport.

== Early life ==
Koya is the son of former National Federation Party leader Sidiq Koya. He is a lawyer and a former board member of Tourism Fiji, the Fiji Legal Aid Commission and the Fiji Hotel Licensing Board.

== Political career ==
In the 2014 election Koya received 895 votes, the 81st highest total amongst all candidates and the 31st highest number of votes among FijiFirst candidates. As his party performed well enough to be eligible for 32 seats, his 895 votes were sufficient to be elected into parliament He served a twelve-day stint as Attorney-General of Fiji (24 September — 6 October 2014). In March 2020, Koya was awarded a parliamentary seat. He was given the seat by the Electoral Commission of Fiji after the seat was vacated by former lands minister Ashneel Sudhakar, who resigned over allegations of sexual harassment. In April 2020, Koya became Minister for Commerce, Trade, Tourism and Transport. In December 2023, Koya was appointed General Secretary of FijiFirst.

He stated in March 2025 that the coalition government currently ruling Fiji was "actively working" to dismantle the work done by the FijiFirst government in making Fiji more modern. He stated that the Fijian population deserved a stronger and more competent government.

Legal offices
Preceded by Aiyaz Sayed-Khaiyum	Attorney-General of Fiji; 2014	Succeeded by Aiyaz Sayed-Khaiyum
Political offices
Preceded by	Member of Parliament; 2014-2018	Succeeded by Premila Kumar
