= Rosy Akbar =

Fijian politician

Rosy Sofia Akbar
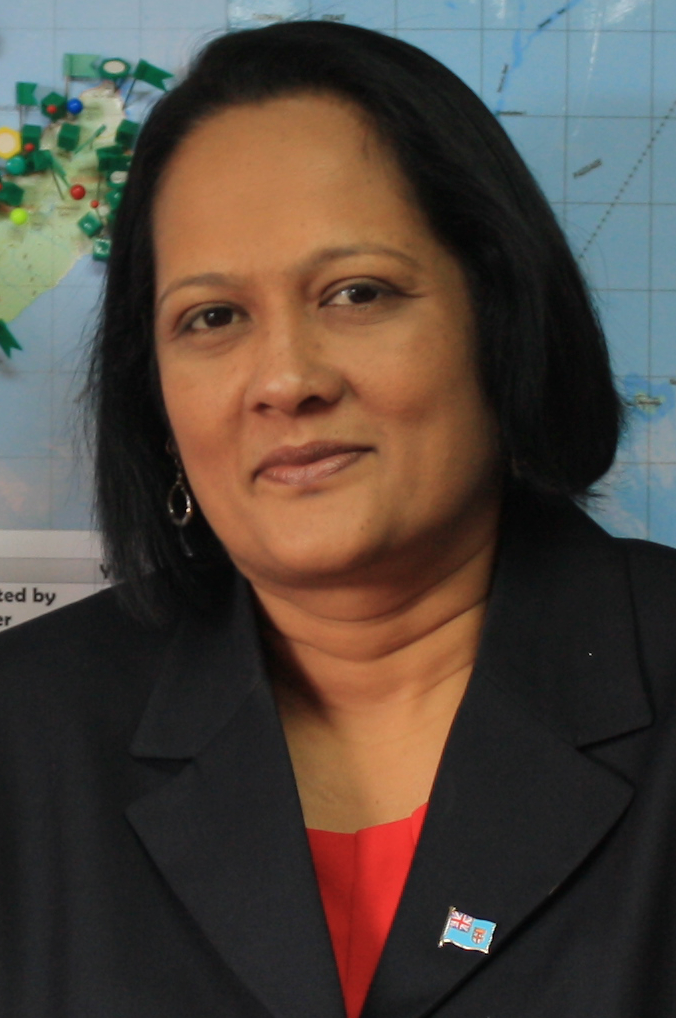
- Akbar in 2014

Minister for Women, Children and Poverty Alleviation
- In office 24 August 2021 – 24 December 2022
- Prime Minister: Frank Bainimarama
- Preceded by: Mereseini Vuniwaqa
- Succeeded by: Lynda Tabuya
- In office 24 September 2016 – 20 November 2018
- Succeeded by: Mereseini Vuniwaqa

Minister for Education, Heritage and Arts
- In office 22 November 2018 – 24 August 2021
- Prime Minister: Frank Bainimarama
- Preceded by: Aiyaz Sayed-Khaiyum
- Succeeded by: Premila Kumar

Minister for Health and Medical Services
- In office 10 September 2016 – 20 November 2018
- Prime Minister: Frank Bainimarama
- Preceded by: Jone Usamate
- Succeeded by: Ifereimi Waqainabete

Personal details
- Party: FijiFirst
- Known for: Former Vice-Principal of A.D. Patel College

Rosy Sofia Akbar is a Fijian politician and former Member of the Parliament of Fiji who served as the Minister for Women, Children and Poverty Alleviation from 2021 to 2022. She is originally from Ba and before entering politics she was Vice-Principal of A.D. Patel College.

Akbar was elected to Parliament in the 2014 election, in which she won 990 votes, and was appointed Minister for Women, Children and Poverty Alleviation. Following a cabinet reshuffle in September 2016 she was appointed Minister for Health and Medical Services. She was re-elected at the 2018 election, winning 705 votes, and was appointed Minister of Education.

On 13 February 2023 she resigned from Parliament for health reasons. She was replaced by Virendra Lal.
