= Virendra Lal =

Fijian politician

Virenda Lal

Member of the Fijian Parliament for FijiFirst List
- Incumbent
- Assumed office 24 February 2023
- Preceded by: Rosy Akbar
- In office 8 December 2020 – 14 December 2022
- Preceded by: Vijendra Prakash

Personal details
- Party: FijiFirst

Virenda Lal is a Fijian politician and member of the Parliament of Fiji. Elected as a member of the FijiFirst party, he became an independent following the party's collapse.

Before entering politics he was secretary of Hindu organisation Shree Sanatan Dharam Pratinidhi Sabha.

Lal entered parliament for the first time in December 2020, following the resignation of Vijendra Prakash. He contested the 2022 Fijian general election as a FijiFirst candidate, but did not win a seat.

He returned to parliament in February 2023 following the resignation of Rosy Akbar.

On 31 May 2024 he was one of 17 FijiFirst MPs purportedly sacked by the party for voting to increase their salaries against a party directive. The sacking was deemed invalid by the speaker, and following the collapse and deregistration of the party he remained in parliament as an independent.
