= Ministry of Women, Children and Poverty Alleviation =

Government ministry of Fiji

The Ministry of Women, Children, Social Protection and Cohesion is the government ministry of Fiji responsible for overseeing the well-being of women, children, the elderly, disadvantaged and the disabled in Fiji. The current Minister for Women, Children, Social Protection and Cohesion is Hon. Sashi Kiran.

== Responsibilities ==
The ministry provide services and programs that relates to the care and protection of women and children, the elderly and persons living with disabilities as well as the promotion of gender equality and the reduction of poverty. The Ministry is also tasked in delivering care to the older and disabled people.

== Ministers ==
Ministers	Title	Ref
Hon. Sashi Kiran	Minister for Women, Children and Poverty Alleviation	
Ms. Selina Kuruleca	Acting Permanent Secretary for Ministry of Women, Children and Poverty Alleviation	

== See also ==
- Ministry of Education, Heritage and Arts
- Ministry of Health and Medical Services
- Ministry of Foreign Affairs and International Cooperation
- Ministry of Commerce, Trade, Tourism and Transport
