= Vijendra Prakash =

Fijian politician

Vijendra Prakash was a Fijian politician and Member of the Parliament of Fiji for the FijiFirst Party. He was elected to Parliament in the 2018 election. He resigned from parliament in December 2020 and was replaced by Virendra Lal.
