= Veena Bhatnagar =

Fijian politician

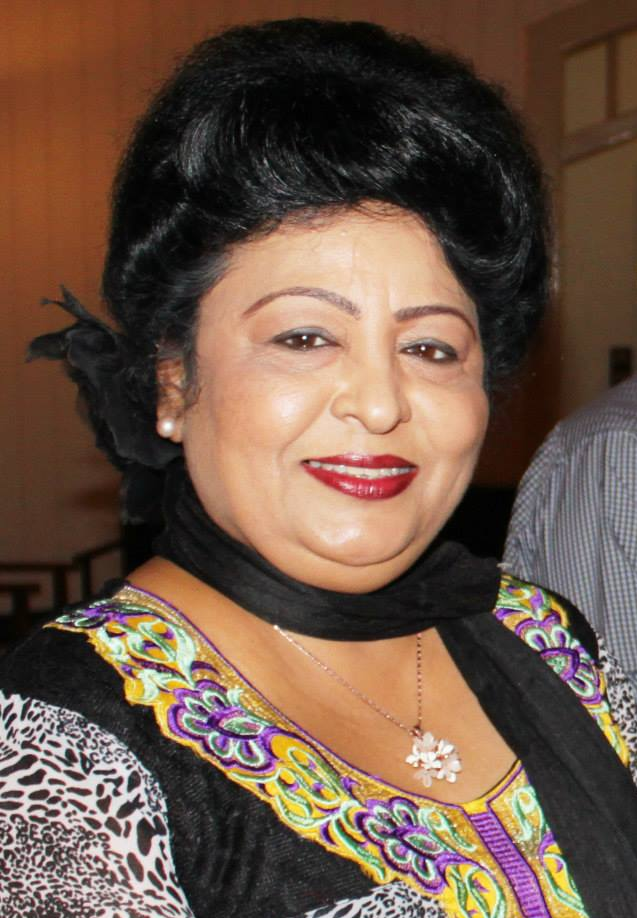
Bhatnagar at the Australian Ambassador's residence, June 2015

Veena Kumar Bhatnagar is a Fijian politician who served as a member of the Parliament of Fiji from 2014 to 2022. She served as the Assistant Minister for Women, Children and Poverty Alleviation. She is a member of the FijiFirst party.

Bhatnagar is a former radio personality and program director for Radio Fiji Two.

She was announced as a candidate for the FijiFirst Party on 15 August 2014 only a week after hosting a debate between a FijiFirst and an opposition party representative on her Aaina Radio show where her neutrality as host was called into question by some critics. She reappeared as a guest on a later episode of Aaina where she defended her performance as a host in the aforementioned debate and claimed she did not know that she was going to stand as candidate for Fiji First when she hosted the debate.

In the 2014 election Bhatnagar received 874 votes, the 82nd highest total amongst all candidates and the 32nd highest number of among Fiji First Candidates. As her party performed well enough to be eligible for 32 seats, her 874 votes was sufficient to be elected into parliament.

She ran for re-election in 2018, and placed 25th, garnering 577 votes. As her party managed to win 27 seats, she had won a seat in Parliament. In the first sitting of parliament after the election, she was nominated as Deputy Speaker by the ruling FijiFirst party, and managed to be appointed, with 27 votes cast for her with 24 cast for the Opposition Nominee, Adi Litia Qionibaravi.

She served as Deputy Speaker from 2018 to 2022, occasionally presiding over sittings when Speaker Ratu Epeli Nailatikau was absent. She served until the Parliament was dissolved and elections were called in October 2022.

She ran for a 3rd term in the 2022 General Elections, under the FijiFirst banner once again. However, this time she garnered 527 votes and placed 31st in the party list, and was unable to qualify for a seat in Parliament, as her party had only been able to win 26 seats. FijiFirst, despite being the largest party in Parliament, was unable to negotiate a coalition deal with the Social Democratic Liberal Party, and lost re-election. She was succeeded as Deputy Speaker by NFP MP Lenora Qereqeretabua. She was succeeded as Assistant Minister for Women, Children and Poverty Alleviation by Sashi Kiran.

She returned to parliament in March 2023 following the resignation of Ifereimi Waqainabete.
