= Atonio Lalabalavu =

Fijian politician (born 1978/79)

The Honourable Ratu Atonio Lalabalavu MP
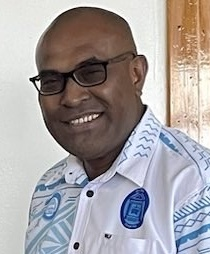
- Atonio Lalabalavu in 2023

Minister for Health and Medical Services
- Incumbent
- Assumed office 24 December 2022
- Prime Minister: Sitiveni Rabuka
- Preceded by: Ifereimi Waqainabete

Member of the Fijian Parliament for PA List
- Incumbent
- Assumed office 14 December 2022

Member of the Fijian Parliament for SODELPA List
- In office 14 November 2018 – 14 December 2022

Personal details
- Born: 1978 or 1979 (age 46–47)
- Party: Social Democratic Liberal Party; People's Alliance

Ratu Atonio Rabici Lalabalavu (born 1978/1979) is a Fijian doctor, politician, and Cabinet Minister. He is a member of the People's Alliance. He is the son of Speaker of Parliament and Tui Cakau Ratu Naiqama Lalabalavu.

Lalabalavu was a doctor before entering politics. He was first elected to the Parliament of Fiji as a SODELPA candidate in the 2018 Fijian general election, winning 5016 votes and being elected alongside his father. He was appointed opposition health spokesperson, and gave his initial speech as an MP on 29 November 2018.

In November 2022 once parliament had been dissolved for the 2022 election he resigned from SODELPA and joined the People's Alliance. He contested the election as a PA candidate and was elected with 2826 votes. On 24 December 2022 he was appointed Minister for Health and Medical Services in the coalition government of Sitiveni Rabuka.
