= James Fong =

Fijian Doctor

Permanent Secretary for the Ministry of Health and Medical Services
- Incumbent
- Assumed office October 2020; Acting: June 2020 – October 2020
- Prime Minister: Frank Bainimarama
- Minister: Ifereimi Waqainabete

Personal details
- Spouse: Monica Fong
- Children: 1
- Education: Fiji National University (MBBS, MM)

James Fong is a Fijian obstetrician-gynaecologist who serves as the Permanent Secretary (PS) for the Ministry of Health and Medical Services (MOHMS).

During the COVID-19 pandemic, Fong led the COVID-19 Incidental Management Team (IMT) and is well known for giving COVID-19 updates in daily press briefings.

== Career and education ==
After completing his Bachelor of Medicine and Surgery and Master of Medicine in the Fiji National University, he became an Obstetrics and Gynecology specialist for thirty years. He later headed the Obstetrics and Gynacelogy Unit of the Colonial War Memorial Hospital.

In February 2020, Fong was appointed to lead the COVID-19 Incidental Management Team (IMT) that dealt with the COVID-19 pandemic in Fiji which provided advice and recommendation to the Cabinet of Fiji.

In June 2020, he was appointed as the Acting Permanent Secretary till October 2020 in which his position as Permanent Secretary became official.

== Personal life ==
Fong hails from the village of Nabubu in Macuata with maternal links to Dogotuki in Vanua Levu. He attended Xavier College in Ba for his secondary level education and he is married to Monica Fong who is a Health System Coordinator for the World Health Organisation. They have one son.
