= Premila Kumar =

Minister for Education of Fiji from 2021 to 2022

The Honourable Premila Kumar MP
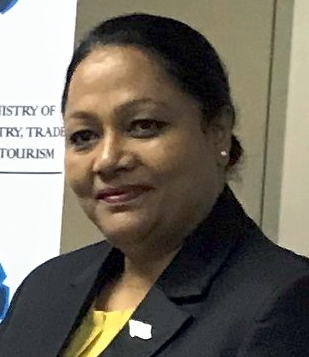
- Kumar in 2020

Minister for Education, Heritage and Arts
- In office 24 August 2021 – 24 December 2022
- Prime Minister: Frank Bainimarama
- Preceded by: Rosy Akbar
- Succeeded by: Aseri Radrodro

Minister for Local Government
- In office 22 November 2018 – 24 December 2022
- Prime Minister: Frank Bainimarama
- Preceded by: Parveen Bala
- Succeeded by: Maciu Katamotu

Minister for Housing and Community Development
- In office 22 November 2018 – 24 August 2021
- Succeeded by: Aiyaz Sayed-Khaiyum

Minister for Commerce, Trade and Tourism
- In office 22 November 2018 – 21 April 2020
- Preceded by: Faiyaz Koya
- Succeeded by: Faiyaz Koya

Member of the Fijian Parliament for FijiFirst List
- Incumbent
- Assumed office 14 November 2018

Personal details
- Born: Suva, Fiji
- Party: FijiFirst
- Children: three

Premila Kumar is a Fijian consumer advocate, politician and former Cabinet Minister. She was chief executive of the Consumer Council of Fiji from 2006 to 2018, and then as a Cabinet Minister in the government of Frank Bainimarama from 2018 to 2022. She is a member of the FijiFirst party.

== Early life ==
Kumar was born in Suva and educated at Suva Methodist Primary School, Dudley Intermediate, and Mahatma Gandhi Memorial High School. She then studied for a bachelor of science at Sophia College for Women in India, before working as a teacher. She later completed a Post Graduate Certificate in Education at the University of the South Pacific, and a Master of Science in trade and the environment in the Netherlands. She later worked as a Government environmental advocate and as an investment manager at Fiji Islands Trade & Investment Bureau.

In 2006 she was appointed chief executive of the Consumer Council of Fiji. As chief executive she led campaigns on drug prices, bank fees, and fuel prices, among other issues. She also was a council member of Consumers International. She resigned as chief executive in July 2018 in order to pursue a career in politics.

In 2010 the Fiji Times named her the most influential woman of the year. In 2015 she was awarded the Executive Woman of the Year Award in 2015 by Women in Business.

== Political career ==
Kumar was selected as a candidate for the FijiFirst party for the 2018 Fijian general election. She was elected, and appointed Minister for Industry, Trade, Tourism, Local Government, and Housing. As a Minister, she opposed the restoration of elected local councils, which had been abolished by the military regime in 2009. A cabinet reshuffle in April 2020 saw her surrender the Commerce, Trade and Tourism portfolio to former Minister Faiyaz Koya, while continuing as Minister for Local Government, Housing and Community Development. A further reshuffle in August 2021 saw her appointed Minister for Education, Heritage and Arts, and surrender the Housing and Community Development portfolios to Aiyaz Sayed-Khaiyum.

She was re-elected in the 2022 election, winning 1025 votes, but lost her Cabinet position when the Bainimarama regime lost power to the coalition government.
