= Ifereimi Waqainabete =

Fijian politician

Doctor Ifereimi Waqainabete
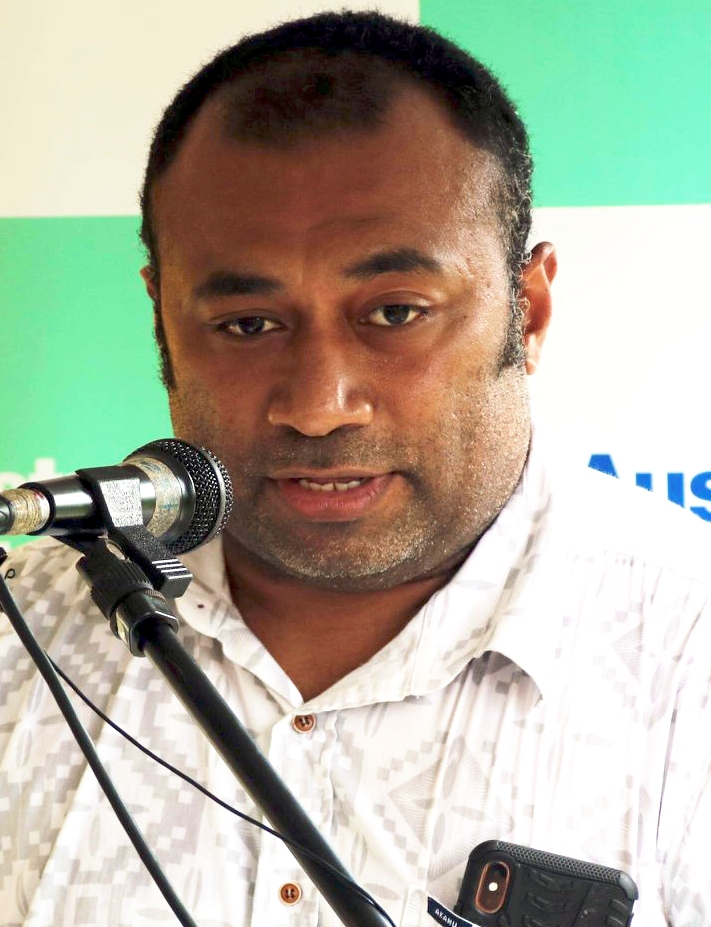
- Waqainabete in 2019

Minister for Health and Medical Services
- In office 22 November 2018 – 24 December 2022
- Prime Minister: Frank Bainimarama
- Preceded by: Rosy Akbar
- Succeeded by: Atonio Lalabalavu

Personal details
- Party: FijiFirst
- Children: Four

Ifereimi Waqainabete is a Fijian politician and former Member of the Parliament of Fiji who served as Minister for Health and Medical Services in the FijiFirst government from 2018 to 2022. Before entering politics Waqainabete was a general surgeon in Fiji and associate professor of general surgery at Fiji National University, former president of the Fiji Medical Association, president of the Pacific Island Surgeons Association, and former chairman of Fiji Medicinal Board. He was on leave from his academic and surgical duties to partake in the 2018 elections as a candidate for the Fiji First Party.

== Early life ==
Dr Waqainabete is from Moala, Lau in Fiji. His father was a PWD engineer and therefore his family moved a lot in his early school days. He attended primary schools at Draiba Fijian, New Farm State School in Brisbane, Australia and at Delainamasi Government school. He completed high school education from Lelean Memorial, Natabua High School, Labasa College and Nasinu Secondary.

== Medical career ==
Ifereimi Waqainabete studied at the Fiji School of Medicine, now under Fiji National University, graduating with MBBS in 1996. He was the President of Fiji School of Medicine Student's Association. During this time, he helped successfully petition for the Autonomy of Fiji School of Medicine from the Ministry of Health. This resulted in the significant growth of the then Fiji School of Medicine and its ability to petition separately for donor support.

He joined the surgical training program in Fiji and graduated with a Master of Medicine in Surgery from the Fiji School of Medicine in 2003.

=== Career in New Zealand ===
After being awarded the Rowan Nicks scholar award in 2003, Dr Waqainabete moved with his family to New Zealand and worked in the position of senior registrar in General surgery at the Palmerston North hospital to gain further experience in surgery.

He moved back to Fiji to work for few years, then later returned to Christchurch, New Zealand as an Upper GI and Hepatobiliary fellow at Christchurch hospital in 2012. The following year he worked as Breast and Endocrine fellow at Christchurch hospital in 2013.

== Return from New Zealand ==
Upon returning to Fiji after completing initial clinical rotations in New Zealand, Ifereimi Waqainabete worked as a general surgeon at Colonial War Memorial Hospital. During this period, he was appointed Medical Superintendent of the hospital, a position he held from 2009 to 2011. In 2012, he left the role to pursue further surgical fellowships in New Zealand.

During his tenure, he was also involved in the supervision and training of surgical trainees from Fiji and other Pacific Island countries.

=== 2014-current: appointment to FNU and academia ===
On his return to Fiji for the second time from New Zealand, Dr Waqainabete commenced work back in CWM hospital as a consultant surgeon. Soon after he joined the Fiji National University College of Medicine, Nursing and Health Sciences department of Surgery as Associate Professor in Surgery. It is usual for an FNU appointed surgeon to provide surgical services to the hospital as part of the agreement between FNU and Ministry of Health. He is the current the Head of Department of Surgery, Anaesthesia and Women's Health in FNU.

=== Fiji Medical Association ===
Dr Waqainabete is the current President of the Fiji Medical Association and has been re-elected several times in the past.

In 2000, as the FMA president, the FMA executives petitioned for success increase in on-call allowances. It was common for doctors to work 24 hours straight on call and continue to work the next day with an allowance of only $10 on top of their basic salary.

in 2016, as the President of the FMA, Dr Waqainabete together with the FMA executives petitioned for and successfully persuaded the Fiji First Government to increase salary for all doctors in Fiji by 50-100%. This was passed in the 2016 budget and implemented immediately. Prior to this doctors in Fiji were underpaid and frequently worked many hours over the 76 hours per fortnight without compensation. Fiji constantly suffered from an exodus of highly trained medical professional leaving to work in New Zealand and Australia, citing remuneration as one of the major factors.

Due to his experience of the work conditions of doctors in New Zealand, he is an advocate on safety, well being and preventing burnout of doctors in Fiji.

=== Pacific Island Surgeons Association (PISA) ===
In 2018, at the combined GSA/PISA meeting, the Pacific Islands Surgeon Association held its Annual General Meeting (AGM) and elected the board of executives. Dr Waqainabete was elected as the President of the Pacific Island Surgeons Association, taking over from Lord Viliame Tangi, Chief General Surgeon of Tonga.

=== Relations with the Australasian College of Surgeons ===
In his current academic and surgical capacity, Dr Waqainabete maintains close relations with the Royal Australasian College of Surgeons a non-profit body that maintains surgical training standards in Australia and New Zealand as well and supports global health initiatives.

The continuing relations led to a historic combined General Surgeons Association Australia meeting with the Pacific Island Surgeons Association in Denarau, Fiji 2018 and was attended by over 340 surgeons and trainee surgeons from Australasia and the Pacific.

=== Rowan Nicks Scholar ===
In 2003 Dr Waqainabete was awarded the Rowan Nicks Pacific Island Scholar award by the Royal Australasian College of Surgeons.

=== Women in surgery ===
Dr Waqainabete supports training of Fijian and Pacific women in surgery. During his tenure at CWM as General surgeon and Medical Superintednant, he supported the first three cohort of women in surgery get selected into the Masters of Surgery training program and they have gone to successfully complete the training program to becoming Fiji first group of female surgeons to complete the training program. All three females successfully completed general surgery training and are now branching out into surgical subspecialties in Peadiatric Surgery (Dr Annette Chang), Plastic surgery (Dr Rachna Ram) and ENT (Dr Fane Lord). Since then, more women have joined the surgical training program in Fiji, leading to the first combined sub-meeting of Pacific Women in Surgery and Royal Australasian College of Surgeon's women in surgery delegates at the GSA//PISA meeting in Denarau, Fiji 2018.

== Public health campaigns ==
Working as a general surgeon in Fiji, Dr Waqainabete some of the surgical load of complications related to non-communicable lifestyle disease especially Diabetes. After performing unprecedented number of lower limb amputations due to Diabetic Foot sepsis, he is frequently in the media to raise awareness on this issue. Similarly, running the breast cancer clinic in CWM hospital, he saw that the breast cancer related morbidity and mortality is high amongst women in Fiji due to delayed diagnosis and late presentations. He is supports raising awareness on Breast cancer and Pinktober Campaign.

== Political career ==
In 2018, Dr Ifereimi Waqainabete joined the Fiji First party as a one its candidates for the 2018 general elections in Fiji. Though not on social media himself, his supporters developed a page on Facebook in support with the page generating more than 2000 followers within 10 days.

He resigned from Parliament on 10 March 2023. He was replaced as an MP by Veena Bhatnagar.

== Personal life ==
Hailing from Moala, Lau, Dr Waqainabete practices surgery in Suva. He is married to Dr Miriama Waqainabete who also went to the Fiji School of Medicine and they have 4 children together.

== Research ==
1. Management of malignant pleural effusions by talc pleurodesis
2. Sigmoid volvulus in pregnancy: case report and review of literature.
