= Health in Fiji =

Life expectancy in Fiji is 66 years for men and 72 years for women. Maternal mortality was 59 per 100 000 live births in 2013.

The Human Rights Measurement Initiative finds that Fiji is fulfilling 76.5% of what it should be fulfilling for the right to health based on its level of income. When looking at the right to health with respect to children, Fiji achieves 92.1% of what is expected based on its current income. In regards to the right to health amongst the adult population, the country achieves only 77.4% of what is expected based on the nation's level of income. Fiji falls into the "very bad" category when evaluating the right to reproductive health because the nation is fulfilling only 60.1% of what the nation is expected to achieve based on the resources (income) it has available.

== Healthcare ==
Fiji decided in 1977 to take a village-based approach to primary health care with a network of village health workers. This had some effect, particularly in the improvement of water and sewage systems but the country is short of qualified doctors and nurses. The programme has been criticised because of a lack of proper monitoring of the health standards in the communities and villages.

The secretary of Fiji's Medical Association says Fiji compares well with other developing countries. More than 70% of government spending for healthcare is for hospital services. Health financing is all from general taxation as there is no social health insurance. In 2012 this was about 9.4% of overall government expenditure. Total health expenditure was 4% of gross domestic product in 2012. About a third of that was private health expenditure.

There is a network of 98 nursing stations, similar to health posts and mostly in rural areas, 84 health centres, staffed by either a doctor or a nurse practitioner and 19 subdivisional hospitals across the country. About 61% of the public spending for the nursing stations and 26% of spending for hospital inpatient care is directed to services for the poorest 20% of the population. There are also about 130 private general practitioner clinics.

The incidence of chronic kidney disease is increasing. Renal dialysis is provided free of charge in the intensive care unit but further dialysis costs $750 per week, which is beyond the reach of most of the population. The Kidney Dialysis Centre is a private facility.

For highly specialised healthcare, Fiji continues to rely on overseas health systems and expertise. Such arrangements have caused controversy in the past including one episode in which the leading Fijian academic Ganesh Chand, then Vice Chancellor of Fiji National University, allegedly abused his authority by approving the payments for overseas medical treatment for the then Minister of Education and the Chairman of the Fiji National University Council, Filipe Bole.

=== Hospitals ===
There are 25 government hospitals (including two national referral hospitals) and three private hospitals providing secondary and tertiary care in Fiji.

Public and Private Hospitals in Fiji
Division	Sub-division	Role	Hospital name	Served Population (2007)	Bed Capacity
Central	N/A	National Referral Centre (NRC)	St Giles Hospital	850,000	136
Central	N/A		Tamavua/Twomey Hospital	850,000	91
Central	N/A	Divisional and NRC	Colonial War Memorial Hospital	330,245	458
Central	Tailevu Province	Subdivisional Hospital (SDH) – Level 2	Korovou Hospital	22,287	17
Central	Rewa Province		Nausori Maternity Hospital	47,891	15
Central	Serua Island/ Namosi Province		Navua Hospital	26,220	12
Central	Naitasiri Province		Vunidawa Hospital	19,332	21
Central	Rewa Province	Area Medical	Wainibokasi Hospital	14,434	14
Eastern	Lakeba Island	SDH – Level 2	Lakeba Hospital	8,149	12
Eastern	Lomaloma District		Lomaloma Hospital	26,220	16
Eastern	Lomaviti Islands		Levuka Hospital	16,400	40
Eastern	Kadavu Island		Vunisea Hospital	10,285	22
Eastern	Rotuma Dependency	Area Medical	Rotuma Hospital	2,479	14
Eastern	Matuku Island		Matuku Hospital	650	5
Western	Ba Province, Lautoka City	Divisional and NRC	Lautoka Hospital	345,810	339
Western	Ba Province	SDH – Level 1	Ba Hospital	60.700	50
Western	Tavua District	SDH – Level 2	Tavua Hospital	28,160	42
Western	Ra Province	SDH – Level 2	Rakiraki Hospital	30,940	22
Western	Nadi Conurbation	SDH – Level 1	Nadi Hospital	80,688	85
Western	Nadroga-Navosa Province	SDH – Level 1	Sigatoka Hospital	54,400	60
Northern	Macuata Province	Divisional and NRC	Labasa Hospital	133,070	161
Northern	Cakaudrove Province	SDH – Level 1	Savusavu Hospital	32,204	58
Northern	Bua Province	SDH – Level 2	Nabouwalu Hospital	14,660	31
Northern	Taveuni Island	SDH – Level 2	Waiyevo Hospital	15,328	33
Private – NRC	Rewa Province, Suva		Pacific Specialist Healthcare (Note: The Pacific Specialist Healthcare hospital opened in 2017)		40
Private	Makogai Island		P.J. Towmey Hospital (Note: The P.J. Towmey Hospital was first set up on Makogai Island to cater for leprosy patients in 1911. It was moved to Tamavua in 1969.)		
Private	Rewa Province, Suva		Suva Bayview Hospital		
Private	Nasese		Nasese Private Hospital		40
Private	Ra Province		Ra Meternity Hospital		7
Private	Nakasi		Nine Miles Medical Center		
