= Ministry of Health and Medical Services (Fiji) =

Government ministry of Fiji

- Minisitiri ni Bula kei na Veiqaravi Vakavuniwai (Fijian) स्वास्थ्य एवं चिकित्सा सेवा मंत्रालय (Fiji Hindi)
- Coat of arms of Fiji

Agency overview
- Jurisdiction: Republic of Fiji
- Headquarters: Toorak, Suva
- Annual budget: ▲$394.3m FJD (2020-2021)
- Minister responsible: Dr Ratu Atonio Rabici Lalabalavu, Minister for Health and Medical Services
- Website: health.gov.fj

The Ministry of Health and Medical Services (MOH) is a government ministry of Fiji responsible for overseeing Fiji's Healthcare system. Its head office is in Dinem House in Toorak, Suva. The current Minister for Health and Medical Services is Dr Ratu Atonio Rabici Lalabalavu who was appointed to the position in November 2022.

== Responsibilities ==
The Ministry is tasked to provide quality healthcare to the people of Fiji. It does this through its 3 main Divisional Hospitals, 18 Sub-divisional Hospitals and over 80 Health Centres in which are operated by divisional and sub-divisional departments of the Ministry of Health. The Ministry is also tasked in enacting public health policies and overseeing the implementation of public health programmes.

== Ministers ==
Ministers	Title	Ref
Hon. [[Atonio Rabici Lalabalavu]]	Minister for Health and Medical Services	
Dr. Jemesa Tudravu	Permanent Secretary for Ministry of Health and Medical Services	

== See also ==
- Health in Fiji
- COVID-19 pandemic in Fiji
