= Ministry of Education (Fiji) =

Government ministry of Fiji

Ministry of Education, Heritage and Arts
- Coat of arms of Fiji

Agency overview
- Jurisdiction: Republic of Fiji
- Headquarters: Gordon street, Suva
- Annual budget: ▼$450.6m FJD (2020–2021)
- Ministers responsible: Aseri Radrodro, Minister for Education; Ifereimi Vasu, Minister of Heritage and Arts
- Website: education.gov.fj

The Ministry of Education, Heritage and Arts is the ministry of Fiji responsible for overseeing Fiji's education system. The current Minister for Education is Viliame Gavoka, who was appointed to the position in January 23rd 2024

== Responsibilities ==
The Ministry is tasked to conduct and deliver education services to all Fijian students. The Ministry has numerous responsibilities - advising the government, providing administrative and management support, enacting policies and acts, and providing learning resources such as text books. The Ministry is also tasked to make and distribute external exams to schools all over the country.

Besides the government providing free education to primary and secondary school students, they also provide free text books and free bus fare initiatives.

== Ministers ==
Minister	Title
Hon. Premila Kumar	Minister for Education, Heritage and Arts
Hon. Joseph Nitya Nand	Assistant Minister for Education, Heritage and Arts
Angeela Jokhan	Permanent Secretary for Ministry of Education, Heritage and Arts

== See also ==
- Education in Fiji
