= Ministry of Commerce, Trade, Tourism and Transport (Fiji) =

Government ministry of Fiji

- Coat of arms of Fiji

Agency overview
- Jurisdiction: Republic of Fiji
- Annual budget: ▲$87.1m FJD (2020-2021)
- Ministers responsible: Viliame Gavoka, Minister for Tourism and Civil Aviation; Manoa Kamikamica, Minister for External Trade Cooperatives and SMEs
- Website: mcttt.gov.fj

The Ministry of Commerce, Trade, Tourism and Transport (MCTTT) is a ministry of Fiji responsible for formulating and implementing policies and strategies to facilitate growth and investments in Fiji and promoting trade, tourism, and consumer protection.

== Divisions ==
- Economic Unit – responsible in formulating and monitoring policies and projects in the private sector.
- Trade Unit – formulate and implement policies to coordinate international trade and investments.
- Tourism Unit – responsible in developing the tourism industry.
- Finance Unit – provides financial aid to the Ministry and its statutory agencies.
- Human Resources Unit – provides administrative support in managing departments, agencies and trade commissions.
- MSME Fiji – formulate policies for the development of micro, small and medium enterprises (MSME).
- Department of Cooperative Business – implement policies to promote the establishment and monitoring of businesses.
- Department of National Trade Measurement Standards – implement laws and regulations to protect consumers from unsafe and poor quality products.
- Department of Transport – efficiently manage transport planning and monitor policies that affiliate with transport.
