= Tupou Draunidalo =

Fijian lawyer and politician

Roko Tupou Draunidalo
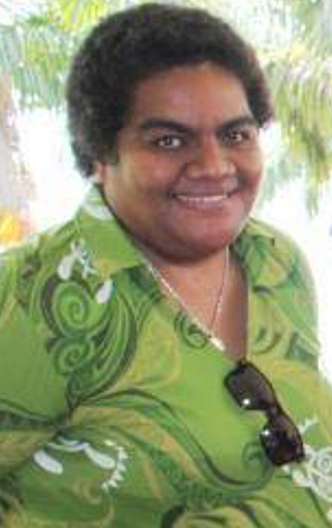

Leader of One Nation (Fiji)
- Incumbent
- Assumed office June 29, 2026

Member of the Fijian Parliament for NFP List
- In office 17 September 2014 – 23 January 2017

Personal details
- Born: Tupou Takaiwai Senirewa Draunidalo
- Party: Fijian Association Party; National Federation Party; HOPE Party; One Nation (Fiji)
- Relations: Timoci Bavadra (stepfather)
- Parent(s): Kuini Speed (mother); Savenaca Draunidalo (father)
- Education: Draiba; Veiuto Primary; Suva Grammar; Canberra Girls' Grammar School
- Alma mater: University of the South Pacific; Australian National University
- Occupation: Lawyer, politician

Roko Tupou Takaiwai Senirewa Draunidalo is a Fijian lawyer and politician. She is a former member of the Parliament of Fiji and from 2018 to 2022 was the president of the HOPE party.

== Early life and career ==
Draunidalo is the daughter of former Fiji Deputy Prime Minister Adi Kuini Speed, a Paramount Chief from Nadroga-Navosa, who was deposed in the 2000 Fijian coup d'état, and her first husband, Savenaca Draunidalo, who served in the cabinet of Laisenia Qarase, which was deposed in the 2006 Fijian coup d'état. Her stepfather, Timoci Bavadra was briefly Prime Minister of Fiji in 1987, before being ousted in the 1987 military coup by Sitiveni Rabuka.

Draunidalo was educated at Draiba, Veiuto Primary, Suva Grammar, Canberra Girls' Grammar School, the University of the South Pacific and the Australian National University. She stood as a candidate for the Fijian Association Party (FAP) in the 2001 election, contesting the Laucala Open Constituency, but polled only 248 votes out of more than 11,500 votes cast.

On 9 September 2006, she was elected vice-president of the Fiji Law Society, defeating Rajesh Gordon.

== Opposition to 2006 coup ==
Draunidalo condemned the military coup that took place on 5 December 2006, and threatened a possible court challenge to the legitimacy of the interim Cabinet sworn in on 8–9 January 2007.

On 30 January 2007 Draunidalo was arrested by soldiers along with Pacific Centre for Public Integrity Director Angie Heffernan and questioned on charges of sedition. In June 2007 she was prevented from leaving Fiji to attend an international conference after being mistakenly included on an immigration blacklist. In July 2007 she was charged with contempt of court after stating in an interview with ABC that Fijian lawyers had lost faith in the judiciary. The case was subsequently withdrawn, but the High Court criticised Attorney-General Aiyaz Sayed-Khaiyum for bringing it and awarded costs against him.

Draunidalo represented lawyers including the president of the Fiji Law Society Mr. Dorsami Naidu in various litigation after the 2006 coup, she also represented an NGO in an application at the eleventh hour to join the constitutional litigation going to the validity of the 1997 constitution between the elected prime minister and the usurping military commander. The substantive matter upheld the validity of the constitution and the arguments of Draunidalo's NGO client was largely adopted by the court.

In 2012, Draunidalo represented former Fijian Prime Minister Laisenia Qarase in his corruption trial.

== National Federation Party ==
In March 2014 Draunidalo was elected as president of the National Federation Party. She competed in the 2014 election, winning 2,966 votes and becoming one of eight women to enter parliament.

In June 2016, she made remarks against the Fijian Minister for Education, Mahendra Reddy asking him if he thought the opposition side were "dumb natives". She was taken to the government controlled Privileges Committee who recommended that she be suspended from parliament for the remainder of the term. In January 2017 she resigned from the NFP and from parliament to avoid working with Sitiveni Rabuka who had resumed leadership of the main opposition party. Her seat was taken by Parmod Chand, and she was succeeded in the presidency by Pio Tikoduadua.

== HOPE Party ==
In 2018 Draunidalo formed the HOPE Party, becoming its leader. The party was registered in July 2018, with Draunidalo leading it into the 2018 elections. The party won no seats, and was deregistered and effectively banned by the Fijian government in February 2022.

In June 2022 Draunidalo applied to become a candidate for FijiFirst. In January 2023 she was nominated to the Constitutional Offices Commission by opposition leader Frank Bainimarama as a replacement for Aiyaz Sayed-Khaiyum.
