= Filimoni Vosarogo =

Fijian politician

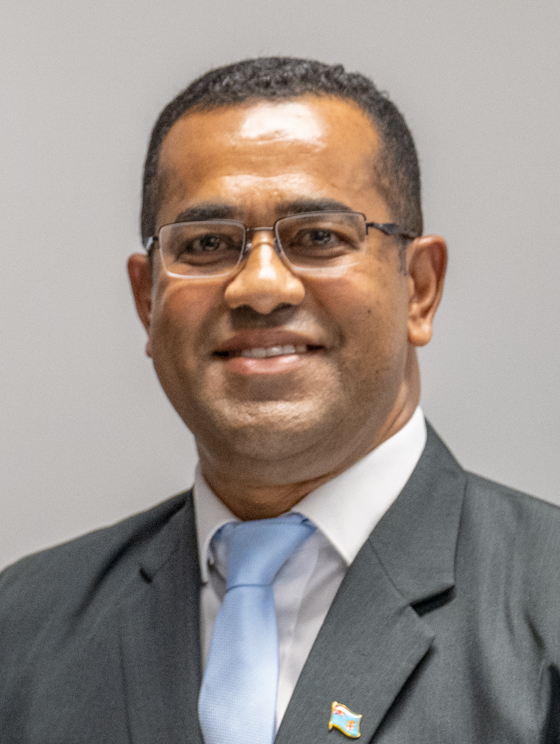
- Filimino Vosarogo

Minister for Lands and Mineral Resources
- Incumbent
- Assumed office 24 December 2022
- Prime Minister: Sitiveni Rabuka

Member of the Fijian Parliament for PA List
- Incumbent
- Assumed office 14 December 2022

Personal details
- Party: Social Democratic Liberal Party (2018–2021); People's Alliance (2021–present)

Filimoni Wainiqolo Rasokisoki Vosarogo is a Fijian lawyer, politician, and Cabinet Minister. He is a member of the People's Alliance.

Vosarogo worked as a lawyer and civil servant, including as legal manager for the land Transport Authority. In December 2016 he was elected chair of Fiji National Rugby League.

Vosarogo has appeared in a number of high-profile cases against the military regime and the FijiFirst government which succeeded it. In 2011 he represented former Fiji Land Force Commander, Brigadier General Pita Driti, in his trial for sedition and mutiny. In 2019 he represented opposition MP Mosese Bulitavu in his retrial for sedition. In May 2019 he represented Fiji Trades Union Congress secretary Felix Anthony after he was detained by police for attempting to organise a protest march against job cuts. In 2020, he represented SODELPA MPs under investigation by the Fiji Independent Commission Against Corruption.

== Political career ==
In August 2014 he was founding president of the One Fiji Party. He ran as a One Fiji candidate in the 2014 election campaign, and during campaign he opposed the FijiFirst regime's classification of all citizens as "Fijian" and its non-recognition of iTaukei.

During the 2018 Fijian general election he acted as lawyer for the Social Democratic Liberal Party (SODELPA). In August 2020 he contested the SODELPA deputy leadership. In December 2020 he was elected deputy leader, defeating Lynda Tabuya by one vote. In February 2021 he opposed the government's deportation of University of the South Pacific vice-chancellor Pal Ahluwalia. In March 2021 he called for Fiji Human Rights and Anti-Discrimination Commission director Ahswin Raj to be fired over the FHRDC's failure to oppose the FijiFirst government's policing bill, which restricted human rights.

In November 2021 he resigned from SODELPA to join the People's Alliance.

He contested the 2022 Fijian general election as a People's Alliance candidate. During the election campaign he criticised the salaries paid to top public servants, such as land transport Authority CEO Samuel Charles Simpson, claiming that the FijiFirst government was paying a "different brain rate" for non-Fijians. Simpson subsequently quit shortly after the coalition government took office.

He was elected to the Parliament of Fiji with 4408 votes. On 24 December 2022 he was appointed Minister for Lands and Mineral Resources in the coalition government of Sitiveni Rabuka.

In January 2026 he acted as prime minister while Sitiveni Rabuka was in Aotearoa for medical treatment.
