= Sashi Kiran =

Fijian politician and activist

The Honourable Sashi Kiran MP
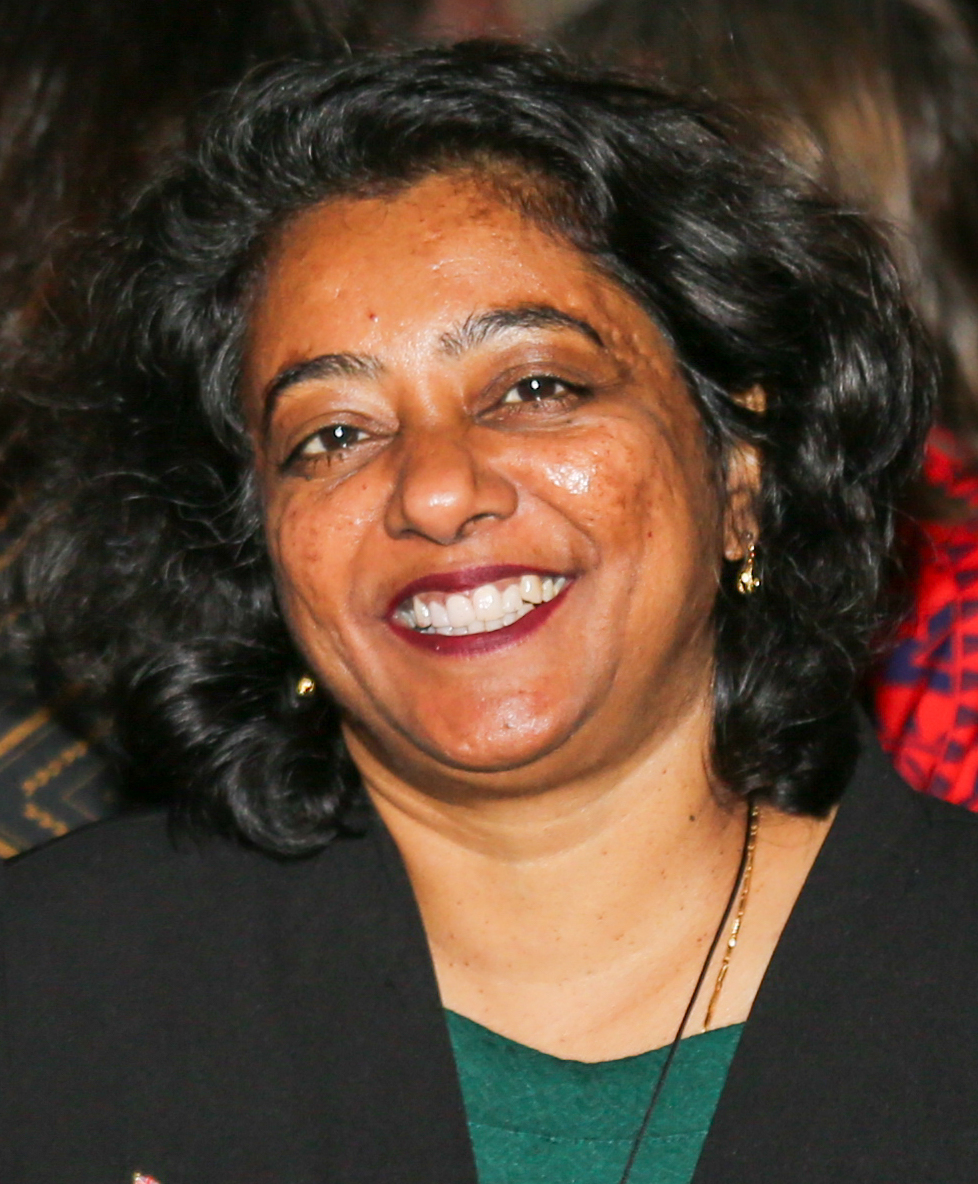

Minister for Women, Children and Social Protection
- Incumbent
- Assumed office 27 December 2024
- Prime Minister: Sitiveni Rabuka
- Preceded by: Lynda Tabuya

Member of the Fijian Parliament for NFP List
- Incumbent
- Assumed office 14 December 2022

Personal details
- Born: Fiji

Sashi Kiran is a Fijian politician of the National Federation Party. A member of the Parliament of Fiji, she is the current Minister for Women, Children and Social Protection.

== Biography ==
She is the Founder and former Chief Executive officer community organization, Foundation for Rural Integrated Enterprises and Development that works on poverty alleviation through socio-economic and health empowerment programs.

Over the years she has served on many global civil society boards including CIVICUS, Asia South Pacific for Basic and Adult Education, Global Network of CSOs on Disaster Risk Reduction. She has also served as advisory committee chair for USP Lautoka Campus.

Kiran has been involved in Climate Change Mitigation and Adaptation programs in the region and has been an advocate for regenerative agriculture which has led her to currently serve as the Chairperson of the Pacific Organic Ethical Trade Community (POETCom).

Hon. Kiran also serves on the University of Exeter (UK) Global Community Food and Health Project Advisory Committee.

Currently she serves on two Parliamentary Standing Committees on Economic and Social Affairs.

== Early life ==
Kiran worked as a journalist for Fiji Communications before joining the Fiji Council of Social Services. Following the 2000 Fijian coup d'état Kiran founded FRIEND in 2001 to create income generating opportunities for rural and semi-urban settlements and villages, with a particular focus on youth and people with special needs. Some of its projects include a line of chutneys made by women in rural communities with raw ingredients purchased from small-holder farmers, flours made from local crops, greeting cards made by people with disabilities and herbal teas. In 2017 the organisation opened a restaurant specialising in traditional Fijian and Indian food. The organisation also works on disaster response initiatives, rehabilitation and healing, and peace building projects.

Kiran has worked with the Commonwealth Foundation on a regional report on citizens and good governance and served on the executive council of international NGO CIVICUS as well as Asia South Pacific Association for Basic and Adult Education. In 2017 she served on the Commonwealth Elections Observer Team for the 2017 elections in Papua New Guinea.

== Political career ==
In November 2022 Kiran resigned from FRIEND to stand in the 2022 Fijian general election as a candidate for the National Federation Party. Her decision resulted in her being attacked by Attorney-General Aiyaz Sayed-Khaiyum, who accused her of using FRIEND as a front for her political agenda. She won 2024 votes and was elected to the Parliament of Fiji. On 24 December 2022 she was appointed Assistant Minister for Women, Children and Poverty Alleviation in the coalition government of Sitiveni Rabuka.

In August 2024 Kiran was appointed to lead the steering committee to develop the Fiji Truth and Reconciliation Commission.

Following the sacking of Lynda Tabuya on 26 December 2024, Kiran was sworn-in as Minister the next day.
