= Qionibaravi =

Qionibaravi is a surname. Notable people with the surname include:

- Anaseini Qionibaravi, Fijian politician
- Litia Qionibaravi, Fijian chief
- Mosese Qionibaravi (1938–1987), Fijian chief
