= Biman Prasad =

Fijian Politician

The Honourable Biman Prasad MP
- बिमन प्रसाद (Fiji Hindi)
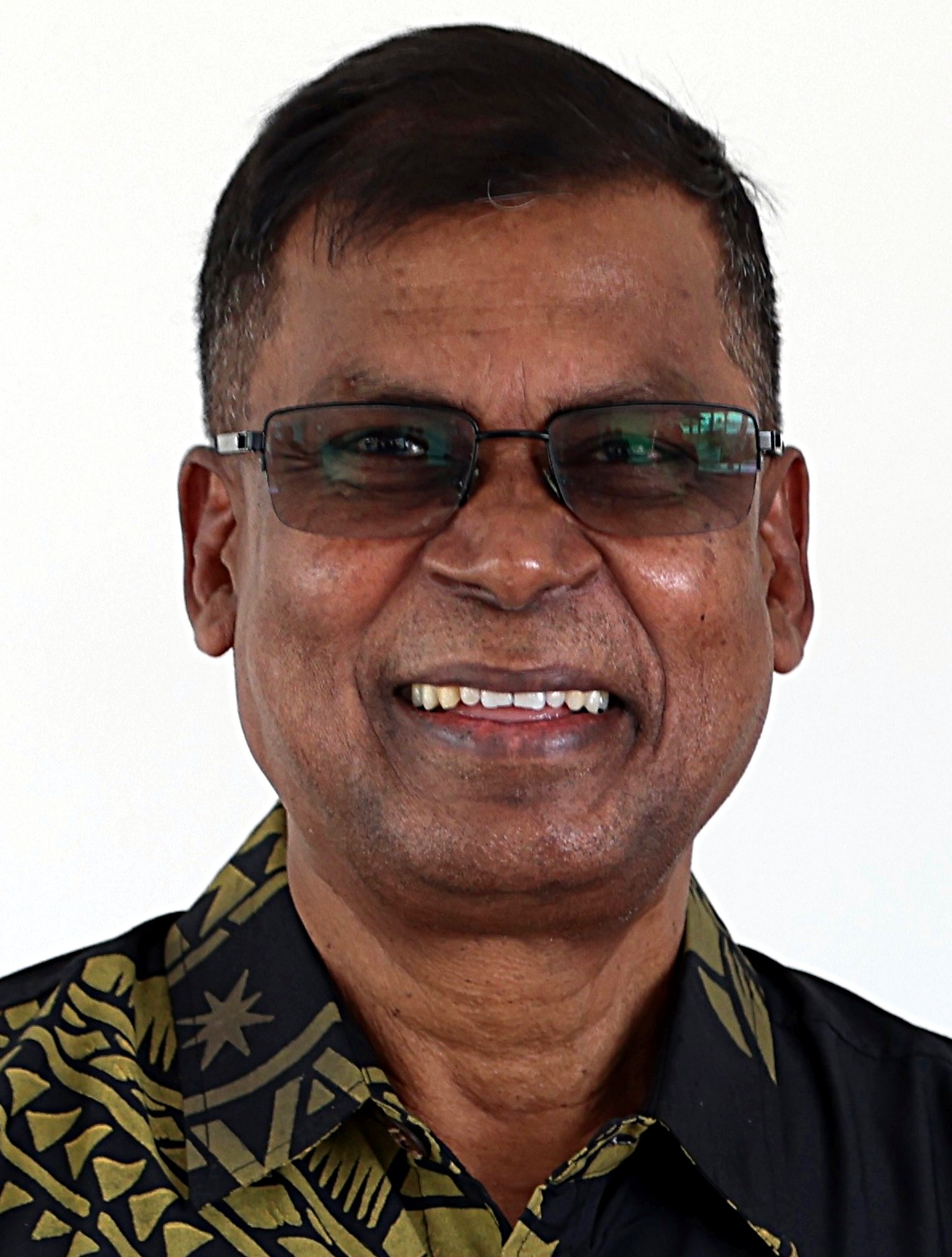
- Prasad in 2023

Deputy Prime Minister of Fiji
- In office 24 December 2022 – 28 October 2025 Serving with Viliame Gavoka & Manoa Kamikamica
- Prime Minister: Sitiveni Rabuka

Minister of Finance
- In office 24 December 2022 – 28 October 2025
- Prime Minister: Sitiveni Rabuka
- Preceded by: Aiyaz Sayed-Khaiyum (Note: as Minister of Economy)
- Succeeded by: Esrom Immanuel

Leader of the National Federation Party
- Incumbent
- Assumed office 2014
- Preceded by: Raman Pratap Singh

Member of the Fijian Parliament for NFP List
- Incumbent
- Assumed office 17 September 2014

Personal details
- Born: Dreketi, Fiji
- Party: National Federation Party
- Spouse: Rajni Chand (m. 1986)
- Children: 2

Biman Prasad (born 1961 or 1962) is a Fijian politician, economist and former Cabinet minister who served as Deputy Prime Minister and Minister of Finance from 2022 to 2025. He has led the National Federation Party since 2014.

== Early life and education ==
Prasad was born in Dreketi in Vanua Levu and was educated at Muanidevo Indian School, Dreketi Junior Secondary School and Labasa College. After graduating with a Bachelor of Arts in mathematics and economics from the University of the South Pacific, he pursued a Masters of Commerce from the University of New South Wales and Doctor of Philosophy from the University of Queensland.

He married Rajni Chand in 1986. They have two children.

== Academic career ==
Prasad became a lecturer at the University of the South Pacific in 1986. He was President of the USP staff Association from 1999 - 2006, head of the School of Economics from 2003 to 2007, and Professor of Economics and Dean of the faculty of Business and Economics from 2007 to 2011. He is Associate Editor of the Journal of Fijian Studies and Editor-in-Chief of the Journal of Pacific Studies. Professor Prasad has published several books and journal articles. He has done consultancy work for many regional and international agencies and governments in the South Pacific region.

In April 2014, Prasad resigned as Professor of Economics from the University of the South Pacific to pursue a political career. He continues to hold Adjunct Professorships at the Griffith University, James Cook University and Punjabi University in Patiala, India.

== Political career ==
Prasad stood as a candidate for the National Federation Party in the 1999 election, but was unsuccessful. In 2001, he was nominated as President of the party, but declined.

In March 2014 Prasad was elected as leader of the NFP. He competed in the 2014 election, winning 8,097 votes, the fourth highest-ranked candidate. His party received 5.2 per cent of the popular vote and 3 of the 50 parliamentary seats. Prasad subsequently became the Shadow Minister for Finance, Planning and National Statistics and Chairman of the Parliamentary Public Accounts Committee. His efforts to use the Public Accounts Committee to scrutinise the government's accounts resulted initially in a government boycott, and in 2016 in his removal as chair. In 2015 he led an unsuccessful attempt to revoke the controversial media decree, which limited freedom of the press. He also called for the government to lift its entry ban on Fijian historian Brij Lal, who had been forced into exile in Australia. In September 2016 he was one of a group of opposition MPs arrested after attending an NGO meeting to discuss the military-imposed constitution. He was released after spending a weekend in jail, and no charges were laid. After his release he criticised the government's claims that Fiji had returned to democracy.

He was re-elected at the 2018 elections, winning 12,137 votes. In October 2019 he called for the 2013 Constitution of Fiji to be reviewed, as it has been imposed on Fiji by the military regime. He contrasted this with the 1997 Constitution of Fiji, which had been developed by a process of public consultation. In October 2020 he was investigated by the Fiji Independent Commission Against Corruption over donations made to the NFP. He subsequently sued supervisor of elections Mohammed Saneem for defamation over the allegations. On 25 July 2021 Prasad was arrested by Fijian police after criticising government moves to amend land legislation.

In the leadup to the 2022 election he was arrested by police on charges of "indecently insulting or annoying a person". The director of public prosecutions subsequently refused to lay charges, and criticised police for not investigating the alleged incident properly. It was subsequently revealed that Prasad had been taking legal action against the accuser's husband.

He was re-elected in the 2022 election with 11355 votes. On 24 December 2022 he was appointed a Deputy Prime Minister (one of three) and Minister for Finance, Strategic Planning, National Developments, and Statistics in the coalition government of Sitiveni Rabuka. One of his first actions as Minister was to reinstate funding for the University of the South Pacific, reversing the Bainimarama regime's funding freeze.

In October 2025 he resigned from all his ministerial portfolios after being charged with corruption by FICAC

== Notes ==
Party political offices
Preceded by Raman Pratap Singh	Leader of the National Federation Party; 2014–present	Incumbent
Political offices
Preceded by Aiyaz Sayed-Khaiyum	Minister of Finance; 2022–2025	Incumbent
