= Kamikamica =

Kamikamica is a surname. Notable people with the surname include:

- Josefata Kamikamica (1934–1998), Fijian politician
- Kitione Kamikamica (born 1996), Fijian rugby union player
- Manoa Kamikamica (fl. 1989), Fijian politician
- Tui Kamikamica (born 1994), Fijian rugby league footballer
