= Esrom Immanuel =

Fijian politician

The Honorable Esrom Immanuel MP

Minister of Finance
- Incumbent
- Assumed office 28 October 2025
- Prime Minister: Sitiveni Rabuka
- Preceded by: Biman Prasad

Member of the Fijian Parliament for PA List
- Incumbent
- Assumed office 14 December 2022

Personal details
- Party: People's Alliance

Esrom Yosef Immanuel is a Fijian politician and member of the Parliament of Fiji. He is a member of the People's Alliance.

He was selected as a PA candidate in the 2022 Fijian general election, and was elected to Parliament, winning 1751 votes. On 24 December 2022 he was appointed Assistant Minister for Finance in the coalition government of Sitiveni Rabuka.

He was appointed Minister of Finance on 28 October 2025.
