= Lynda Tabuya =

Fijian politician and lawyer

The Honourable Lynda Diseru Tabuya MP
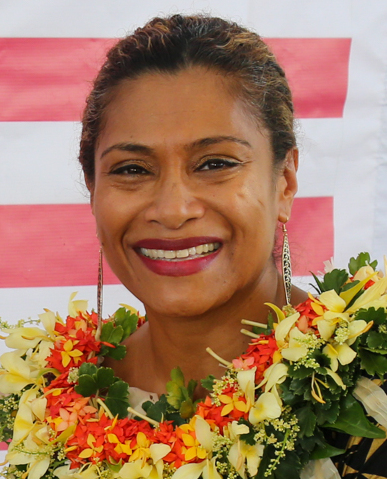
- Tabuya in 2023

Minister for Women, Children and Poverty Alleviation
- In office 24 December 2022 – 26 December 2024
- Prime Minister: Sitiveni Rabuka
- Preceded by: Rosy Akbar
- Succeeded by: Sashi Kiran

Minister of Information
- Incumbent
- Assumed office 5 August 2025
- Prime Minister: Sitiveni Rabuka
- Preceded by: Sitiveni Rabuka

Member of the Fijian Parliament for SODELPA List
- In office 14 November 2018 – 14 December 2022

Personal details
- Party: People's Democratic Party; Social Democratic Liberal Party; People's Alliance

Lynda Diseru Tabuya (born 1972) is a Fijian politician and lawyer who has served as the Minister for Women, Children and Poverty Alleviation from 24 December 2022 to 26 December 2024. In August 2025, she was sworn in as the New Minister of Information, a portfolio previously held by the PM, Sitiveni Rabuka

== Early life ==
Tabuya grew up in Wakanisila in Kadavu Province and is iTaukei. She was educated at Yat Sen Primary School and Adi Cakobau School, before gaining a Bachelor of Laws from Bond University in Australia and a Master of Laws from Washington University in St. Louis, United States. She worked at the University of the South Pacific as an assistant lecturer in law. She resigned from her role after being elected branch secretary for the People's Democratic Party's Suva branch.

Tabuya was Miss Hibiscus 1996.

== Political career ==
In May 2014 Tabuya was elected president of the PDP. She contested the 2014 elections as a PDP candidate, but was unsuccessful as the party failed to meet the 5% threshold. In March 2017 she was elected party leader, replacing Adi Sivia Qoro.

In December 2017 the PDP announced an alliance with the Social Democratic Liberal Party (SODELPA) to run candidates on their list in the 2018 parliamentary election. Tabuya became a SODELPA candidate and subsequently resigned from the PDP. During the election campaign she campaigned for a higher minimum wage and promised to be a "voice for employees" in parliament. She also represented SODELPA leader Sitiveni Rabuka in his electoral fraud trial.

In the 2018 elections she was the highest-polling woman and 5th highest overall candidate. She gave her first speech to parliament on 30 November 2018. In March 2020 she was arrested and charged with breaching the Public Order Act over social media comments about the government's Covid-19 response. She was acquitted of the charges in August 2020. On 25 July 2021 she was arrested by Fijian police after criticising government moves to amend land legislation.

On 7 January 2022, Tabuya announced she had tendered her resignation from SODELPA and would be joining the People's Alliance Party (PAP) - the party led by former Fijian Prime Minister, Sitiveni Rabuka. In May 2022 she was appointed deputy leader of the PA, alongside Daniel Lobhendahn and Manoa Kamikamica.

She was selected as a PA candidate in the 2022 Fijian general election. During the election campaign she was arrested by the Fiji Independent Commission Against Corruption after allegedly soliciting prize money for a "rock the vote" event. She was elected to Parliament, winning 11965 votes. On 24 December 2022 she was appointed Minister for Women, Children, and Poverty Alleviation in the coalition government of Sitiveni Rabuka.

In August 2024 Tabuya suggested restoring the death penalty to combat drug trafficking. In December 2024, she tried banning sugary foods in schools On 26 December 2024 she was removed as Minister for Women, Children and Poverty Alleviation after a nude video of her was leaked online. She was replaced by her assistant minister, Sashi Kiran.
