= Viliame Gavoka =

Fijian politician (born 1950)

The Honourable Viliame Gavoka MP
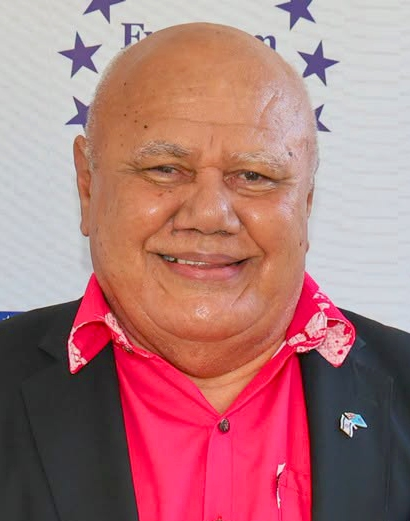
- Gavoka in 2026

Deputy Prime Minister of Fiji
- Incumbent
- Assumed office 24 December 2022 Serving with Biman Prasad (2022-2025) & Manoa Kamikamica (2022-2025)
- Prime Minister: Sitiveni Rabuka

Minister for Tourism and Civil Aviation
- Incumbent
- Assumed office 24 December 2022
- Preceded by: Faiyaz Koya

Minister of Education
- In office 22 January 2024 – 25 April 2024
- Preceded by: Aseri Radrodro
- Succeeded by: Aseri Radrodro

Leader of SODELPA
- In office 28 November 2020 – 19 December 2022
- Preceded by: Sitiveni Rabuka
- Succeeded by: Aseri Radrodro

Member of the Fijian Parliament for SODELPA List
- Incumbent
- Assumed office 17 September 2014

Personal details
- Born: 8 July 1950 (age 76)
- Party: SODELPA
- Relations: Aiyaz Sayed-Khaiyum (son-in-law)
- Education: University of the South Pacific
- Nickname: Bill

Viliame "Bill" Rogoibulu Gavoka (pronounced [βiliame roŋoimbulu ŋaβoka]; born 8 July 1950) is a Fijian politician and Cabinet Minister. From 28 November 2020 to 2022 he was leader of the Social Democratic Liberal Party, after ousting Sitiveni Rabuka in the SODELPA leadership contest.

== Early life ==
Gavoka studied at Ratu Kadavulevu School when he was younger. He studied at the University of the South Pacific for his tertiary education. He was the Chairman of the Fiji Visitors Bureau but was removed from the post in 2009 by the Frank Bainimarama-led government. In May 2009, he was appointed the chairman of the Fiji Rugby Union. In June 2010, he made media headlines when he "prophesied" a natural disaster would hit Fiji on June 23 at 2.30 pm. He was charged for spreading rumours. His involvement in the 1 million dollar lottery scandal at FRU eventually led to him being sacked for the 2nd time as a chairman after Fiji's Commerce Commission found that the lottery had been improperly run. He joined the Fiji Holding Limited board as a director soon after.

In July 2014, he resigned from the Fiji Holding board to enter politics.

== Political career ==
Gavoka joined the SODELPA and ran in the 2014 general elections. He was elected an MP with 3,690 votes. He contested the party leadership in 2016 following the resignation of Teimumu Kepa, losing to Sitiveni Rabuka.

He was re-elected at the 2018 election, winning 3536 votes.

=== SODELPA leader ===
In 2020 a dispute in SODELPA over the election of the party president led to different factions holding rival AGMs and to the suspension of the party by the Registrar of Political Parties. Following the lifting of the suspension, the party held a leadership contest, which was won by Gavoka. Following Gavoka's win, former leader Sitiveni Rabuka resigned from Parliament. On 9 December 2020, SODELPA MP's voted to install Ratu Naiqama Lalabalavu as leader of the opposition rather than Gavoka, causing further tension in the party.

=== 2022 election ===
During the 2022 election, SODELPA won three seats but became the kingmaker as neither FijiFirst nor the National Federation Party-People's Alliance coalition obtained a majority. Once the final results were released, on 19 December, Gavoka's tenure as leader ended in accordance with SODELPA's constitution, which requires the party to choose a new leader if it fails to gain a parliamentary majority. SODELPA's General Secretary, Lenaitasi Duru, announced the party would not elect a successor until its annual general meeting in 2024.

On 24 December 2022 he was appointed a Deputy Prime Minister (one of three) and Minister for Tourism and Civil Aviation in the coalition government of Sitiveni Rabuka.

On 22 January 2024 he was appointed Minister of Education following the dismissal of Aseri Radrodro.

In April 2024 he was replaced as SODELPA leader by Aseri Radrodro. Radrodro was subsequently reinstated as Minister of Education.

== Personal life ==
Gavoka's daughter, Ela married Fiji's attorney general, Aiyaz Sayed-Khaiyum, a wedding which he did not attend.

Party political offices
| Preceded by Sitiveni Rabuka | Leader of SODELPA; 2020–2022 | Vacant |
Political offices
| Preceded by Faiyaz Koya | Minister for Tourism and Civil Aviation; 2022–present | Incumbent |
