= HOPE (Fijian political party) =

Humanity Opportunity Prosperity Equality
- Abbreviation: HOPE
- Leader: Tupou Draunidalo
- President: Tupou Draunidalo
- Founder: Tupou Draunidalo
- Registered: 26 July 2018
- Dissolved: 10 February 2022
- Political position: Centre to centre-left
- Colours: Cyan
- MPs in the Parliament of Fiji: 0 / 51

HOPE (Humanity Opportunity Prosperity Equality) was a political party in Fiji. The party was led by former National Federation Party president Tupou Draunidalo, and supported multiculturalism, a higher minimum wage, and the de-politicisation of the office of Attorney-General.

The party was formed in March 2017 and immediately began campaigning for signatures for registration. It applied for registration as a political party on July 4, 2018, and was registered on July 26.

The party ran 28 candidates in the 2018 elections, 18 of which were women. It was the only Fijian party running a majority of female candidates. It ruled out forming a coalition with the Social Democratic Liberal Party, as the party is led by 1987 coup leader Sitiveni Rabuka.

The party failed to win any seats, winning only 2,811 votes. It was deregistered and effectively banned by the Fijian government in February 2022.
