= Radrodro =

Radrodro is a surname. Notable people with the surname include:

- Aseri Radrodro (born 1972), Fijian politician
- Salote Radrodro (born 1956 or 1957), Fijian politician
