= Aseri Radrodro =

Minister of Education of Fiji since 2024

The Honourable Aseri Radrodro MP
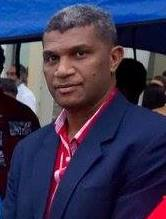
- Rodorodo in 2016

Leader of SODELPA
- Incumbent
- Assumed office 20 April 2024
- Prime Minister: Sitiveni Rabuka
- Preceded by: Viliame Gavoka

Minister of Education
- Incumbent
- Assumed office 25 April 2024
- Prime Minister: Sitiveni Rabuka
- Preceded by: Viliame Gavoka
- In office 24 December 2022 – 22 January 2024
- Preceded by: Premila Kumar
- Succeeded by: Viliame Gavoka

Member of the Fijian Parliament for SODELPA List
- Incumbent
- Assumed office 17 September 2014

Personal details
- Born: 1972 (age 53–54)
- Party: Social Democratic Liberal Party

Aseri Masivou Radrodro (born 1972) is a Fijian politician and Cabinet Minister. Since April 2024 he has been the Leader of the Social Democratic Liberal Party (SODELPA).

Radrodro was born in Serea Village in Naitasiri Province and educated at Soloira District School and Queen Victoria School. He subsequently studied finance at the University of the South Pacific, before gaining a Masters in Business Administration in 2006. He has worked as a public servant, manager, and for the Fiji Sports Council, holding various managerial positions. He has also served on various Boards including the Fiji Electricity Authority (FEA), Fijian Holdings, Fiji TV, Merchant Finance and FHLS.

He joined SODELPA in 2014 and was elected to the Parliament of Fiji at the 2014 elections, gaining 2169 votes. Initially appointed shadow minister for Transport and Infrastructure, in 2017 he was appointed shadow minister for Economy. In the run-up to the 2018 election, then-SODELPA leader Sitiveni Rabuka attempted to block him from being a party candidate, but backed down after intervention from party president Naiqama Lalabalavu. In March 2018 he was noted as a future SODELPA leader.

He was re-elected in the 2018 elections, winning 2,312 votes. In July 2020 he was investigated by the Fiji Independent Commission Against Corruption for his use of parliamentary allowances. In August 2020 he stood for party leader, but lost to Viliame Gavoka. When SODELPA split in 2021 he stayed with the party, and ran as a candidate for the party in the 2022 election.

He was re-elected in the 2022 election. On 24 December 2022 he was appointed Minister of Education in the coalition government of Sitiveni Rabuka. On 19 January 2024 he was dismissed as a Minister for "insubordination and disobedience" after he ignored legal advice in terminating members of the Fiji National University council. He was replaced as Minister of Education by SODELPA leader Viliame Gavoka.

On 22 January 2024 Radrodro was alleged to have been involved in an extramarital affair with fellow Minister Lynda Tabuya.

In April 2024 he was elected as leader of SODELPA, replacing Viliame Gavoka. He was subsequently reinstated as Minister for Education.
