= Anaseini =

Anaseini or Anaseini is a given name. Notable people with the given name include:

- Anaseini Qionibaravi, Fijian politician
- ʻAnaseini Takipō (1893–1918), Queen of Tonga
