= Salote Radrodro =

Fijian politician

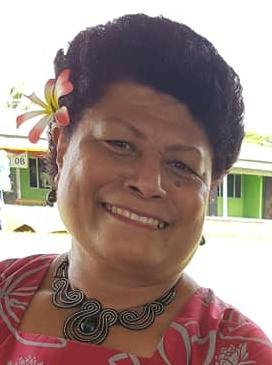
Radrodro at the SODELPA convention in September 2018

Salote Vuibureta Radrodro (born 1956 or 1957) is a Fijian politician and former member of the Parliament of Fiji. She is a member of the Social Democratic Liberal Party (SODELPA). In 2022 she was convicted of corruption and sentenced to two and a half years imprisonment.

== Personal life ==
Radrodo is from Mualevu in the Lau Islands. Her parents were Naibuka and Leba Vuibureta. She was educated at Adi Cakobau School. She was educated at Adi Cakobau School and the University of the South Pacific, where she obtained a Bachelor of Art in Management and Public Administration and a masters in Governance. She spent 36 years as a public servant, working in the Ministry of Foreign Affairs, Public Service Commission, Ministry of Health and Ministry of Women, Social Welfare and Poverty Alleviation from which she retired in 2012.

Her husband is Kitione and she has three sons, and grandchildren.

== Political career ==
She was elected to parliament as a SODELPA candidate at the 2014 elections, gaining 2300 votes One of eight women elected to the 50-member parliament, she said that she hoped they could "work together across parties for the empowerment of other Fijian women".

During her maiden speech to parliament she asserted that the fact that she was not allowed to speak in her indigenous language in parliament was a breach of her human rights, and asked "Why can't the Government come up with alternative options like provision of interpreters in chambers which I am sure we are all familiar with from our exposure in meetings overseas?"

In 2017 she was serving as the Opposition Whip.

She was re-elected in the 2018 general election.

On 6 September 2022 she was convicted of one count of giving false information to a public servant and one count of obtaining a financial advantage after giving a false address to parliament in order to claim travel and accommodation expenses. On 22 September 2022 she was sentenced to two and a half years imprisonment for the offences.
