= Deputy Prime Minister of Fiji =

Senior member of the Fijian government

- iVukevuke ni Matanitu ni Lotu e Viti (Fijian) फिजी के उप प्रधानमंत्री (Fiji Hindi)
- Coat of arms of Fiji

Flag of Fiji
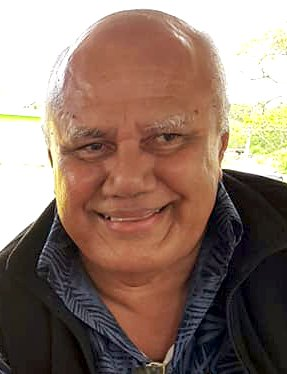
Gavoka

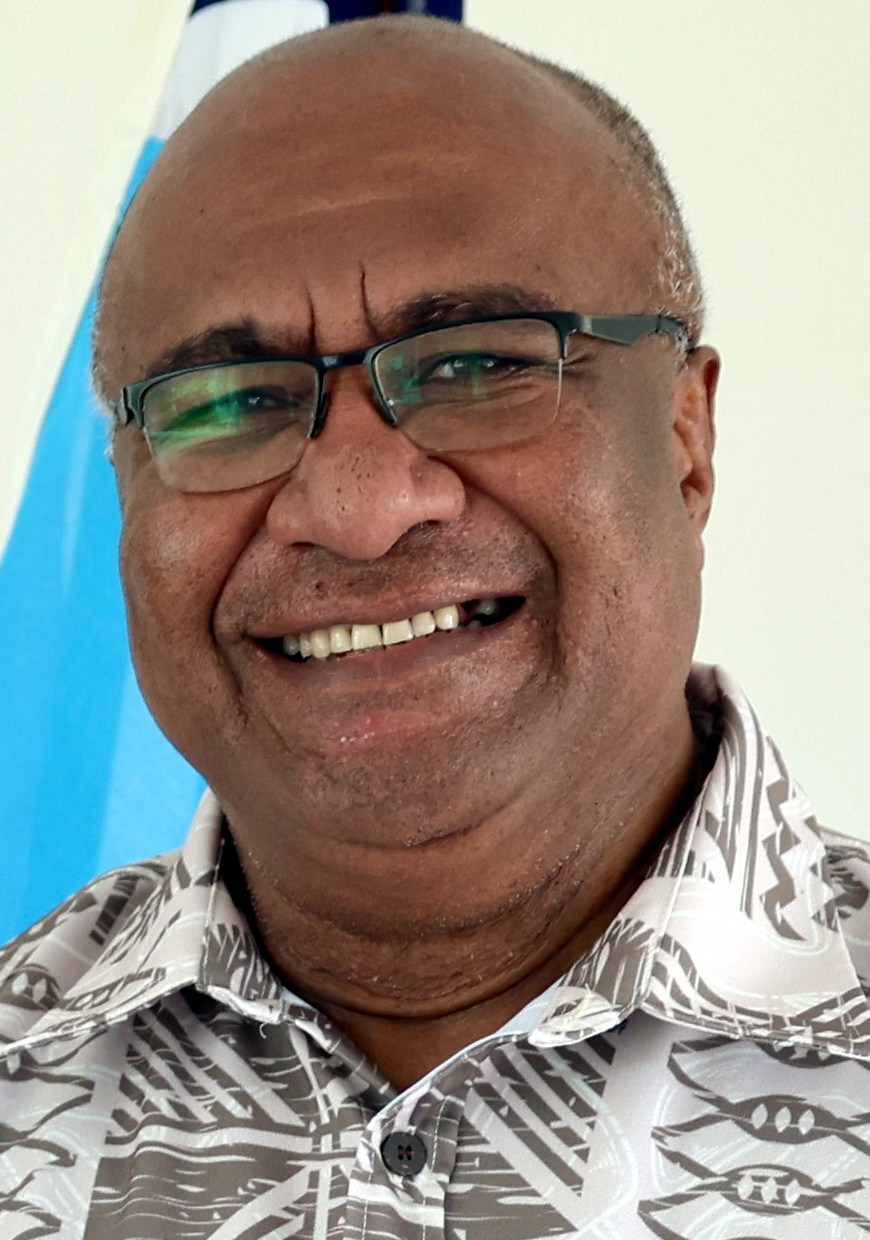
Kamikamica
- Incumbent: Bill Gavoka; since 24 December 2022; Manoa Kamikamica; since 4 August 2026
- Government of Fiji; Cabinet of Fiji; Office of the Prime Minister; Parliament of Fiji
- Style: The Honourable
- Status: Deputy head of government
- Member of: Cabinet

The Deputy Prime Minister of Fiji is the deputy of the prime minister of the Republic of Fiji. Since 2022, there have been three at the starting but currently one serving because the other two were charged in corruption.

== Deputy Prime Ministers ==
Name	Prime Minister	Took office	Left office	Notes
Edward Cakobau	Kamisese Mara	1972	June 1973	
Penaia Ganilau	Kamisese Mara	1973	February 1983	
David Toganivalu	Kamisese Mara	1985	April 1987	Concurrent office holder
Mosese Qionibaravi	Kamisese Mara	1985	April 1987	Concurrent office holder
Harish Sharma	Timoci Bavadra	April 1987	May 1987	
Josefata Kamikamica	Kamisese Mara	October 1991	1992	Concurrent office holder
Sitiveni Rabuka	Kamisese Mara	July 1991	1992	Concurrent office holder
Tomasi Vakatora	Kamisese Mara	1992	1992	Concurrent office holder
Filipe Bole	Sitiveni Rabuka	June 1992	1993 - ?	Concurrent office holder
Timoci Vesikula	Sitiveni Rabuka	June 1993	1994	Concurrent office holder
Taufa Vakatale	Sitiveni Rabuka	August 1997	1999	
Kuini Speed	Mahendra Chaudhry	May 1999	May 2000	Concurrent office holder
Tupeni Baba	Mahendra Chaudhry	May 1999	May 2000	Concurrent office holder
Epeli Nailatikau	Laisenia Qarase	August 2000	2001	
Tupeni Baba	Laisenia Qarase	March 2001	2001	
Epeli Nailatikau	Laisenia Qarase	2001	September 2001	
Teimumu Kepa	Laisenia Qarase	2001	2006	
Biman Prasad	Sitiveni Rabuka	24 December 2022	28 October 2025	Concurrent office holder
Viliame Gavoka	Sitiveni Rabuka	24 December 2022	Incumbent	Concurrent office holder
Manoa Kamikamica	Sitiveni Rabuka	24 December 2022	21 October 2025	Concurrent office holder
Manoa Kamikamica	Sitiveni Rabuka	4 August 2026	Incumbent	Concurrent office holder
