= Adi Cakobau School =

Government school in Fiji

Adi Cakobau school
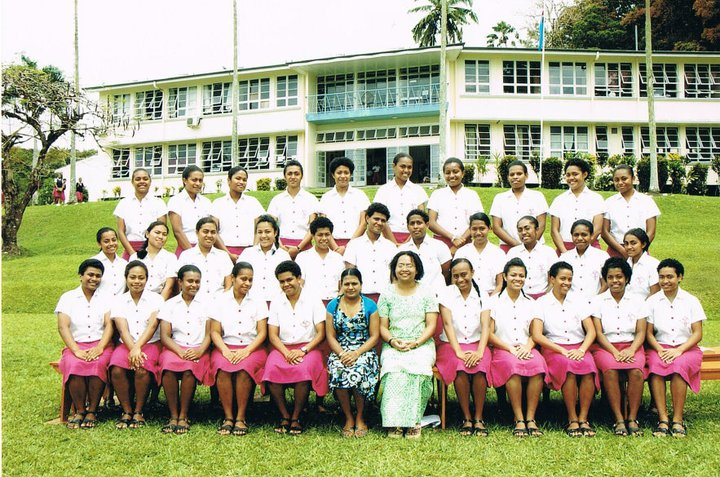
- Class photo taken in 2011

Location
- Sawani, Viti Levu, Fiji
- Coordinates: 18.024665°S 178.468900°E

Information
- Type: Government day and boarding school
- Motto: "Leave the world better than you found it"
- Established: 1948
- Colors: Crimson, white and black Uniform: Standard ladies blouse Skirt

Adi Cakobau School in Fiji was founded in 1948 by the Fijian government as a boarding school to provide an intermediate education for Fijian girls. It was named after the granddaughter of Seru Epenisa Cakobau, who united the islands under his authority in 1871 and ceded the nation to the United Kingdom three years later. It became a full-fledged secondary school in 1954. Its English language curriculum included traditional academic subjects, traditional dance, music and crafts. Since a goal was to provide wives for leaders of the nation, the curriculum included "chiefly protocol." The school moved to its present location in Sawani, Viti Levu in 1956. It is located at Ro Camaisala Road, next to Sawani Village, in the province of Naitasiri. The counterpart school for boys is [Queen Victoria School]. Most of the Fijian elite by 2001 had been students at one of these schools. Adi Cakobau School won the Coca-Cola Lite Games for the unprecedented twelfth time in a row on 28 April 2012.

Entry to Form 3 (Year 9) is restricted and girls will only enter on merit. Only those achieving the highest marks in national examinations taken by pupils in their last year of primary school (Year 8) are entitled to enter.

Adi Cakobau School consists of 4 houses - Mokosoi (Green), Kakala (Blue), Uci (Red) and Lagakali (Yellow).

The first principal in 1948 was Frances Lillian Charlton. The first Fijian principal was Taufa Vakatale. She was a pioneer girl at Adi Cakobau School and was later deputy prime minister of Fiji.

Vocal music by the Adi Cakobau School choir was recorded in the 1950s and is in the collection of the British Library. The school entertained Elizabeth II and Prince Philip in December 1953. The choir toured New Zealand in 1961–62 and Australia in 1973–74. Their performance of the traditional Fijian farewell song "Isa Lei" was included on The secret museum of mankind, vol. 1. Ethnic music classics: 1925–1948 and was included in the soundtrack of the motion picture Open Water.

The school's 60th anniversary was observed in October 2008 by the students and faculty, hundreds of alumnae, and Ratu Josefa Iloilo, president of Fiji.

The school achieved an overall pass rate of 98% for sixth and seventh formers in 2010. It had the continuous after some time with a little difference of 1%–2%.

== Notable alumnae ==
- Jiko Luveni – Dentist, Project Manager for reproductive health, United Nations Population Fund, Fiji Minister of Health, 2008.
- Anaseini Qionibaravi, first female Senator in Fiji
- Salote Radrodro, senior civil servant and, from 2014, Member of Parliament
- Kuini Speed – Head girl, 1968. Fijian chief. Fijian Deputy Prime Minister, 1999 and 2000.
- Finau Tabakaucoro – Assistant Minister for Women, Culture, and Social Welfare 2000–2001
- Lynda Tabuya, Opposition Whip 2018
- Taufa Vakatale – Fiji Chief Education Officer, Secretary for Education, Deputy Prime Minister
