= Esiteri Vakalala-Kamikamica =

Fijian education trade unionist (died 2024)

- Born: Navunievu, Bua Province, Colony of Fiji
- Died: 27 March 2024 (aged 85)
- Education: University of New England, Australia
- Spouse: Josefata Kamikamica
- Children: Manoa Kamikamica

Esiteri Vakalala-Kamikamica (died 27 March 2024) was a Fijian education trade unionist. She was the first woman president of the Fiji Teachers Union and also led the National Council of Women of Fiji.

== Career ==
Vakalala-Kamikamica was born in the village Navunievu, Bua Province, Colony of Fiji, as the fourth eldest of nine children. In 1957, the Methodist Church of Australasia awarded her the Centenary Academic Scholarship, which enabled her to study English and geography at the University of New England in Australia, and in 1961 she became the first Fijian indigenous woman to graduate in a foreign university.

Vakalala served as secretary of the Methodist Church's Education Department and the Fiji Council of Churches, and was a member of other bodies such as the Public Service Commission, the Fiji Consumer Council, the Fiji Retired Teachers’ Association and others in the education sector.

She served as president of the National Council of Women of Fiji for two terms and became the first female president of the Fiji Teachers Union. In October–November 1980, she chaired a women's conference in Suva organised by the United Nations Economic and Social Commission for Asia and the Pacific as part of the United Nations Decade for Women, focusing on gender equality, economic development and peace.

== Personal life and death ==
She was the widow of politician Josefata Kamikamica and mother of politician Manoa Kamikamica. Vakalala-Kamikamica died on 27 March 2024 at the age of 85 after a long illness. She was buried on 5 April in her hometown, and was described as a pioneer trade unionist.
