= Tomasi Vakatora =

Deputy Prime Minister of Fiji
- In office 1992–1992 Serving with Josefata Kamikamica
- Prime Minister: Kamisese Mara
- Preceded by: Sitiveni Rabuka

Personal details
- Born: 18 September 1926
- Died: 12 June 2006

Tomasi Vakatora (18 September 1926 – 12 June 2006) was a Fijian statesman who held Cabinet offices and served as Speaker of the House of Representatives in 1982.

Vakatora entered the House of Representatives as a member of the ruling Alliance Party in 1977 and served in a variety of ministerial positions in the late 1970s and early 1980s. He was elected Speaker of the House of Representatives in 1982, and served till the house was dissolved in 1987. He was appointed Deputy Prime Minister and Minister of Finance in 1992.

In 1995, the Fijian government chose Vakatora as its representative on the Constitutional Review Commission, set up to rewrite the Constitution that had been promulgated in 1990 which many Indo-Fijians alleged discriminated against them.

In 2005 and early 2006, Vakatora spearheaded moves to forge an electoral alliance among indigenous Fijian-led political parties ahead of parliamentary elections held on 6–13 May 2006. On 30 July 2005, Vakatora announced that five such parties, including the ruling Soqosoqo Duavata ni Lewenivanua, had agreed to such a coalition. The parties would exchange preferences and, if elected, form a coalition government. The coalition all but collapsed, however, when two parties pulled out, a third dissolved itself, and a fourth nominated only one candidate.

On 11 August 2005, Vakatora called for Indo-Fijian and minority representation in the House of Representatives to take account of population changes. The three seats allocated to minorities (Europeans, Chinese, and others) were already more than their population numbers warranted, he said, reacting to calls from Labour Minister Kenneth Zinck for their numbers to be increased. Since the 1996 census, the indigenous majority had increased, he claimed, but changes to parliamentary representation would be possible only through a constitutional amendment, which he called for. Vakatora's calls were immediately rejected by Opposition Leader Mahendra Chaudhry, who said that Indo-Fijians were already underrepresented, claiming that they had given up two seats in the constitutional revision of 1997 in order to make way for the minority groups. They had been "short-changed," he said. United Peoples Party leader Mick Beddoes, whose party mostly represents minorities, also said that he would fight any moves to reduce their representation in the House of Representatives.

Vakatora was originally from Naivilaca village in Rewa. In his last years, when not addressing politics at the national level, Vakatora spent time advising Rewan villagers on the controversial Qoliqoli Bill and how it would affect them. He was also involved in the establishment of the Noco Development Bus Company.

Vakatora's autobiography, From the Mangrove Swamps, tells of his life as a simple village boy who enjoyed catching mud crabs, to his rise to the corridors of power, as a senior civil servant, a government minister, and Speaker of Parliament.

Vakatora, 80, was survived by his wife Wainiqolo Vakatora, five children, seventeen grandchildren, and eight great-grandchildren. At his funeral, held at Butt Street Wesley Church in Suva, Rev. Akuila Yabaki (a close personal friend, despite political differences) described Vakatora, the son of a Methodist minister, as a committed Christian whose life was characterized by weekly prayer meetings in his home.

Preceded by Mosese Qionibaravi	Speaker of the House of Representatives; 1982–1987	Succeeded by Militoni Leweniqila
