= One Nation (Fiji) =

- President: Roko Tupou Draunidalo
- General Secretary: Ravindran Kumaran
- Registered: 29 June 2026
- Preceded by: FijiFirst

Website
- https://onenation.com.fj/

One Nation is a political party in Fiji. Founded in 2026, the party includes a number of members from the deregistered FijiFirst party, and is endorsed by former Prime Minister Frank Bainimarama. The party's president is Roko Tupou Draunidalo.

== History ==
One Nation applied for registration to the Registrar of Political Parties on 21 May 2026. One Nation had previously applied under the name FijiansFirst, but had their application rejected due to the name being too similar to the deregistered FijiFirst party. The founders of One Nation included a number of former FijiFirst members, such as Faiyaz Koya, Ravindran Kumaran, Adi Selai Adimaitoga, and Sanjay Salend Kirpal. The party's president is Roko Tupou Draunidalo, a lawyer who previously served as the National Federation Party's president, while Adimaitoga is the vice president, Kirpal the treasurer, and Kumaran the general secretary.

One Nation was registered as a political party on 29 June, becoming the tenth registered political party in Fiji. Frank Bainimarama endorsed One Nation in July 2026, saying that the party's values were similar to what he had stood for as Prime Minister. He stated that the principles of the party included "transparent governance, responsible leadership, national development and reducing the growing socio-economic disparity between the rich and the poor".
