= Capital punishment in Fiji =

Capital punishment has been abolished in Fiji. The island nation abolished capital punishment for ordinary crimes in 1979, and for all crimes in 2015. Its last execution was in 1964, before its independence on 10 October 1970.

In August 2024 Minister for Women and Children Lynda Tabuya suggested restoring the death penalty to combat drug trafficking.
