= Minister of Finance (Fiji) =

Minister of Finance of Fiji
- Coat of Arms of Fiji

- Flag of Fiji
- Incumbent; Esrom Immanuel since 28 October 2025
- The Treasury
- Style: The Honourable
- Member of: Cabinet of Fiji
- Reports to: Prime Minister
- Nominator: Prime Minister
- Appointer: President on the advice of the prime minister

Minister of Finance of Fiji is heading the Ministry of Finance in Fiji.

== Minister of finance in the Kingdom of Fiji ==
Name	Took office	Left office	Notes
Rupert Ryder	1874	1874	

== Financial secretaries in the Colony of Fiji ==
Name	Took office	Left office	Notes
H. W. Davidson	1952	1958	
Eric Raymond Bevington	1958	1961	
Harry Parker Ritchie	1962	1967	

== Ministers of Finance since 1967 ==
Name	Took office	Left office	Notes
Harry Parker Ritchie	1967	1970	
Wesley M. Barrett	?-1971	1972	
Charles Alexander Stinson	1972	1979	
Charles Walker	1979	1983	
Mosese Qionibaravi	1983	1987	
Mahendra Chaudhry	April 1987	May 1987	
Josua Cavalevu	1987	1987	
Josevata Kamikamica	1987	1992	
Tomasi Vakatora	1992	May 1992	
Paul Manueli	June 1992	1994	
Berenado Vunibobo	1994	1997	
James Ah Koy	1997	1999	
Mahendra Chaudhry	1999	2000	
Jone Kubuabola	July 2000	December 2006	
Mahendra Chaudhry	January 2007	August 2008	
Frank Bainimarama	August 2008	September 2014	
Aiyaz Sayed-Khaiyum	September 2014	December 2022	From 23 June 2016, As Minister of Economy
Biman Prasad	December 2022	October 2025	
Esrom Immanuel (acting)	October 2025	Incumbent	

== See also ==
- Economy of Fiji
