= National Council of Women of Fiji =

Fijian women association

National Council of Women of Fiji (NCWF) is a civil association based in Fiji with the aim of promoting women's rights and well-being in the country. It was founded in 1968.

== Background ==
The Republic of Fiji has some of the most progressive laws protecting against discrimination on the grounds of sexual orientation, disability and gender, and is the only country in the region to have an explicit ban on indirect discrimination enshrined in its constitution. Women have been able to vote and stand for election since 1963, a right that was retained following independence from United Kingdom in 1970. Nevertheless, issues remain, such as inequality regarding the minimum age of marriage and restrictions on women's rights in cases of sexual violence. Violence against women is a serious and widespread problem, with high levels of physical, sexual and domestic abuse, although many victims do not report cases, and the situation worsens during periods of political instability.

Women participate actively in the economy, particularly in the informal sector and agriculture, but face inequalities in access to land, formal employment and property. Climate change particularly affects women, increasing their economic and social vulnerability, as well as the risk of violence following natural disasters.

== History ==
The NCWF was founded in 1968. Amid the 2014 general election, the National Council announced a project, in collaboration with the United Nations Democracy Fund, to promote an increase in the number of women in politics and to train women for leadership roles.

Some notable members include Fay Volatabu, Tauga Vulaono and Esiteri Vakalala-Kamikamica.
