= Aiyaz Sayed-Khaiyum =

Fijian politician (born 1965)

Aiyaz Sayed-Khaiyum CF
- ایاز سید خیوم
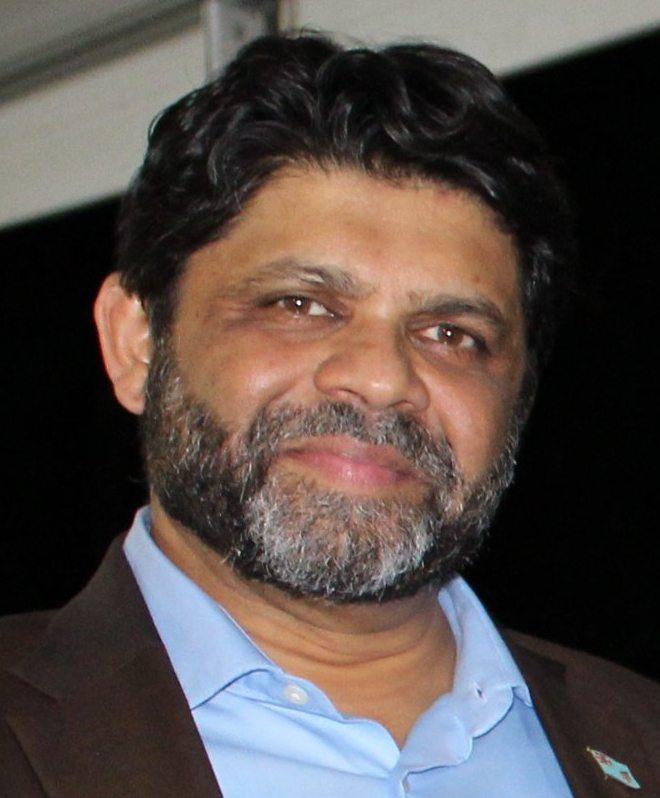
- Sayed-Khaiyum in 2022

33rd Attorney-General of Fiji
- In office 6 October 2014 – 24 December 2022
- President: Ratu Epeli Nailatikau; George Konrote; Wiliame Katonivere
- Prime Minister: Frank Bainimarama
- Preceded by: Faiyaz Koya
- Succeeded by: Siromi Turaga
- In office 8 January 2007 – 24 September 2014
- President: Ratu Josefa Iloilo; Epeli Nailatikau
- Prime Minister: Frank Bainimarama
- Preceded by: Qoriniasi Bale
- Succeeded by: Faiyaz Koya

Minister for Economy
- In office 6 October 2014 – 24 December 2022
- President: Epeli Nailatikau; George Konrote
- Prime Minister: Frank Bainimarama
- Preceded by: Frank Bainimarama (as Minister of Finance)
- Succeeded by: Biman Prasad (as Minister of Finance)

Minister for Communications and Public Enterprise
- In office 6 October 2014 – 24 December 2022

Minister for Civil Service
- In office 6 October 2014 – 24 December 2022

Minister for Justice, Elections and Anti-Corruption
- In office 6 December 2006 – 24 December 2022
- President: Ratu Josefa Iloilo; Ratu Epeli Nailatikau; George Konrote
- Prime Minister: Frank Bainimarama

Personal details
- Born: 24 September 1965 (age 61) Suva, Fiji
- Party: FijiFirst (2014–2024)
- Spouse: Ela Gavoka (m. 2011)
- Relations: Viliame Gavoka (father-in-law)
- Children: Two sons, one daughter
- Education: ANU (BA); UNSW (LLB); University of Hong Kong (LLM); University of Wollongong (GDLP)
- Profession: Lawyer

Aiyaz Sayed-Khaiyum CF (born 24 September 1965) is a Fijian politician and a former cabinet minister. He was the Fijian Attorney-General and the Minister for Economy, Civil Service and Communications, and also served as the Minister responsible for Climate Change under the FijiFirst government. He is the third-highest polling candidate from the Fijian general elections of 2014, 2018 and 2022.

Prior to his appointment as a cabinet minister following FijiFirst's general election victory in September 2014, Sayed-Khaiyum was the Fijian Attorney-General and the Minister for Justice, Anti-Corruption, Public Enterprises, Communications, Civil Aviation, and the Minister responsible for Elections under the Bainimarama Government.

According to The Economist, the daily functioning of the Fijian government was run by Sayed-Khaiyum. The South China Morning Post describes Sayed-Khaiyum as one of the South Pacific's most powerful men.

Sayed-Khaiyum is the former General Secretary of the FijiFirst party. He also served as the Fijian Governor in the Asian Development Bank, was the ADB Chair of the Board of Governors in 2018. In 2019 he was the Chair of the Boards of Governors and Governor of the World Bank Group and the International Monetary Fund.

Following Frank Bainimarama's recovery from heart surgery in January 2022, Sayed-Khaiyum was named Acting Prime Minister.

== Early life and education ==
Sayed-Khaiyum was born and raised in Suva and was educated at Marist Brothers High School. He has a Masters in Law from the University of Hong Kong. As part of his Masters program, he completed a thesis entitled 'Cultural Autonomy - Its Implications for Nation-State'. He also completed his Bachelors Degree in Law from the University of New South Wales. As part of his Degree program, he completed a thesis entitled 'Constitution Making in Divided Societies - Fiji, a case study'. He also completed a graduate diploma in legal practice from the University of Wollongong, and a bachelor's degree in political science from the Australian National University.

He was a former senior legal officer in the Office of the Director of Public Prosecutions. Sayed-Khaiyum was the General Manager of Legal and Compliance and was the Company Secretary in the Colonial Group of Companies for five years immediately prior to his appointment in the Interim Government by the President of Fiji. He also worked with the law firm of Minter Ellison in Sydney. He was on the board of Transparency International Fiji and has been President of the Fiji Young Lawyers Association.

== Political career ==
Sayed-Khaiyum was appointed to the interim government of Frank Bainimarama after the 2006 Fijian coup d'état as Interim Attorney-General and Justice Minister. The 2006 coup has been described by some political historians as a final intervention intended to unite the country and forever put an end to the nation's spate of ethno-nationalist military takeovers.

When Bainimarama formed the FijiFirst party, Sayed-Khaiyum was appointed its general secretary.

Sayed-Khaiyum contested the 2014 election winning 13,753 votes and the 2018 Fijian general election winning 17,271 votes, being the third-highest polling candidate in both elections. He was re-elected in the 2022 Fijian general election with 22524 votes, again pulling in the third-highest number of votes after former Prime Minister Frank Bainimarama and Sitiveni Rabuka. Following the 2022 general election which resulted in a hung parliament, he said was no change in government until there was a vote in parliament in accordance with the 2013 Fijian Constitution. He also questioned the validity of the new coalition between the National Federation Party and The People's Alliance citing concerns raised previously by SODELPA's outgoing general secretary.

On 24 December 2022, Sitiveni Rabuka was voted as Prime Minister on the floor of parliament and formed government with a wafer-thin majority of one vote. Sayed-Khaiyum later resigned from Parliament and currently operates his law firm in Nadi under the name Khidmat Law. On 9 December 2023 he resigned as general secretary of the FijiFirst party citing medical reasons while he was undergoing procedures in Singapore. He raised a number of issues in his resignation letter to the Leader of FijiFirst, commenting on constitutionalism, breakdown of law and order and failed economic policies of the coalition government.

=== Political reforms ===
Sayed-Khaiyum led national public consultations on the draft 2013 Fijian Constitution in the interior, urban, rural and maritime parts of Fiji. The 2013 Fijian Constitution established common and equal Fijian citizenry and an equally weighted voting system.

In the lead-up to the 2014 general election, Sayed-Khaiyum also helped implement a new system of electronic voter registration, shape Fiji's new political party and electoral laws and attract international assistance.

=== Economic reforms ===
As the Minister for Economy, Sayed-Khaiyum raised the income tax threshold from $16,000 to $30,000 and has progressively decreased Fiji's unemployment. Fiji is currently experiencing its lowest unemployment rate in 15 years, and the country's economy has recorded an unprecedented ten consecutive years of growth.

Sayed-Khaiyum also oversaw a programme of civil service reform within the Fijian Government to promote merit-based recruitment and advancement.

=== Climate change advocacy ===
As Minister responsible for climate change and the leader of Fiji's COP23 delegation, Sayed-Khaiyum was also a global proponent of climate adaptation and increasing access to climate finance, and worked with governments, multilateral organisations and development banks to allow countries such as Fiji to obtain adequate levels of funding—on the basis of vulnerability—to build their resilience to climate change. At the COP23 negotiations, where Fiji served as president, parties agreed that the Adaptation Fund would serve the Paris Agreement on Climate Change, and the Fund was replenished with an impressive total of US$93.3 million.

In Fiji, Sayed-Khaiyum spearheaded the creation of the climate change division in the Ministry of Economy to mainstream the critical issue in national planning and public financing decisions, making Fiji one of the few countries in the world where climate change sits with the ministry responsible for finance. He also established a working group in the Office of the Attorney-General to examine peripheral legal issues related to climate change.

=== Communications reforms ===
During Sayed-Khaiyum's tenure as Minister for Communications, Fiji experienced a boom in access to high-speed internet services and Free-to-Air digital television, which is now available all throughout the geographically remote nation.

Sayed-Khaiyum oversaw the Fijian Government's digital transformation programme to digitise government services through a flagship partnership with the Singaporean Cooperation Enterprise, digitalFIJI.

== Criminal charges ==
In February 2024 Sayed-Khaiyum was charged with abuse of office.

On 4 October 2024 Sayed-Khaiyum was charged with 11 counts of abuse of office, 11 counts of receiving a corrupt benefit, 11 counts of breach of trust by a public servant, and 11 counts of unlawful carriage of a firearm on an aircraft.

== Personal life ==
Aiyaz Sayed-Khaiyum is the son of former MP Sayed Abdul Khaiyum. In 2011 he married Ela Gavoka, the daughter of current Deputy Prime Minister and Minister Viliame Gavoka. Together they have two sons, Ibrahim and Idris and daughter, Imaan.

Legal offices
Preceded by Qoriniasi Bale	Attorney General of Fiji; 2007–2014	Succeeded by Faiyaz Koya
Preceded by Faiyaz Koya	Attorney General of Fiji; 2014–2022	Succeeded by Siromi Turaga
Assembly seats
Preceded by	Member of Parliament; 2014–2023	Incumbent
Political offices
Preceded by Frank Bainimarama	Minister for Justice, Elections and Anti-Corruption; 2006–2022	Incumbent
Preceded by Frank Bainimarama	Minister for Economy; 2014–2022	Incumbent
Party political offices
Party established	Secretary-General of FijiFirst; 2014–2024	Succeeded by Disestablished
