= Manoa Kamikamica =

Fijian politician

The Honourable Manoa Kamikamica MP
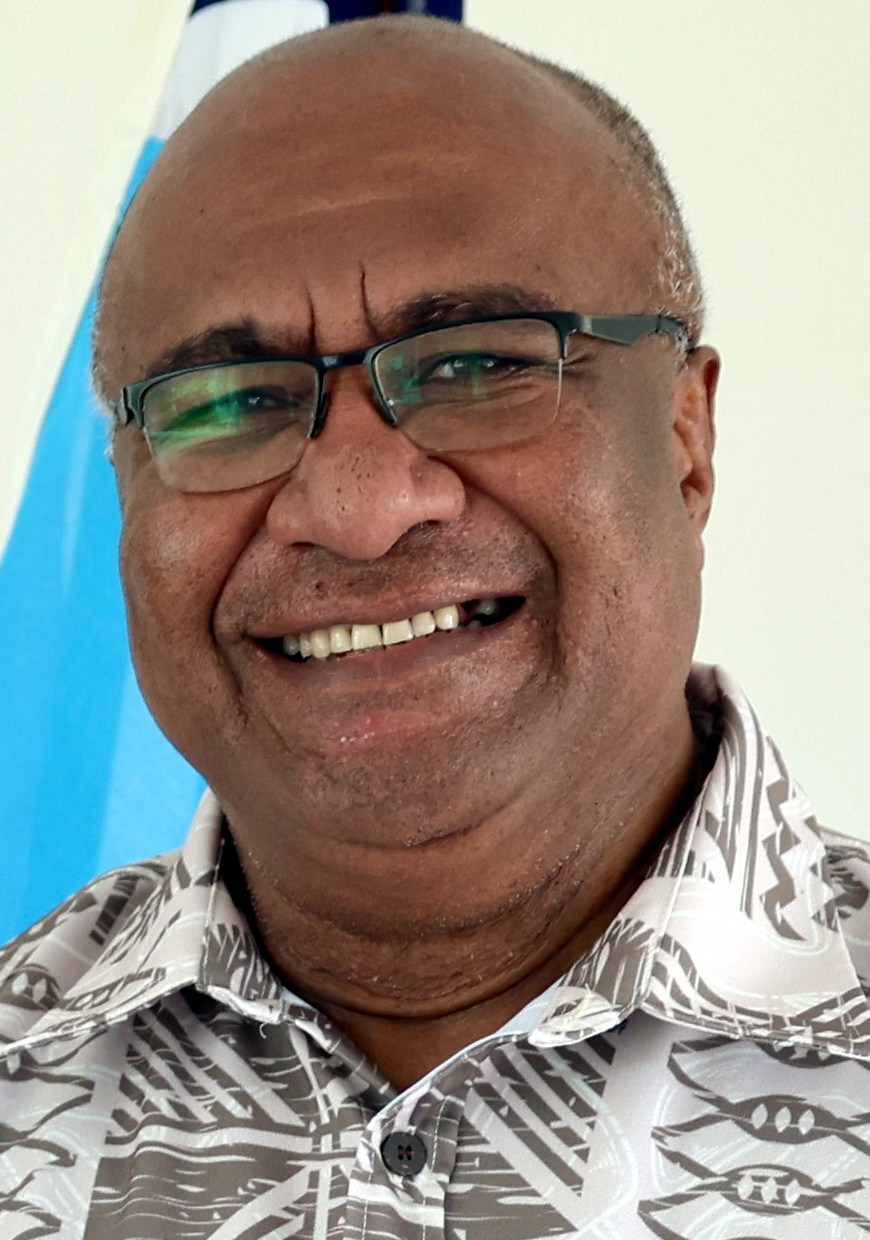
- Kamikamica in 2023

Deputy Prime Minister of Fiji
- Incumbent
- Assumed office 4 August 2026 Serving with Viliame Gavoka
- President: Wiliame Katonivere
- Prime Minister: Sitiveni Rabuka
- In office 24 December 2022 – 21 October 2025 Serving with Biman Prasad & Viliame Gavoka
- President: Wiliame Katonivere
- Prime Minister: Sitiveni Rabuka

Minister for External Trade Cooperatives and SMEs
- In office 24 December 2022 – 21 October 2025
- Preceded by: Faiyaz Koya

Member of the Fijian Parliament for PA List
- Incumbent
- Assumed office 14 December 2022

Personal details
- Party: People's Alliance

Manoa Seru Nakausabaria Kamikamica is a Fijian politician and cabinet minister who served as one of the Deputy Prime Ministers from December 2022 to October 2025 and since August 2026. He is also a member of the People's Alliance serving as deputy party leader.

== Early career and education ==
Kamikamica is a son of Josefata Kamikamica and Esiteri Vakalala-Kamikamica. He attended the University of New South Wales in 1989 and graduated with a BComm degree in Accounting and Information Systems. He joined Fiji Airways and worked as General Manager for Finance and Strategic Planning for 13 years. He then launched and ran the airline's domestic subsidiary, Fiji Link playing a lead role from the acquisition of Sunair.

In December 2016, Kamikamica was appointed the head of the ANZ Bank in Tonga. He previously served with ANZ Bank in Papua New Guinea for six years, starting off as Chief Financial Officer and then Associate Director in International Banking. Prior to entering politics, Kamikamica worked as Chief Financial Officer and General Manager at Lyndhurst Group of Companies.

== Political career ==
In April 2022, Kamikamica was appointed deputy party leader of the People's Alliance led by Sitiveni Rabuka. He ran for the 2022 Fijian general elections and was able to secure a seat. His party won 21 seats and formed a coalition government with the National Federation Party (NFP) and the Social Democratic Liberal Party (SODELPA). On 24 December 2022, he was appointed Deputy Prime Minister of Fiji and Minister for External Trade Cooperatives and SMEs.

On 20 January 2023, following Rabuka's two days state visit to Kiribati, Kamikamica was named Acting Prime Minister.

In January 2024, following the dismissal of Aseri Radrodro, SODELPA's management board discussed options to make Kamikamica Prime Minister, or to switch support to FijiFirst.

In October 2025, Kamikamica stepped down from his ministerial roles after being charged with perjury and providing false information in his capacity as a public servant. He was acquitted of all charges in August 2026. He was reinstalled as Deputy Prime Minister and Minister for Industries, Commerce, Business Development and Public Enterprises on 4 August 2026.
