= Mosese Qionibaravi =

Fijian chief, civil servant and politician

Mosese Qionibaravi CMG

Deputy Prime Minister
- In office 1985–1987
- Succeeded by: Harish Sharma

Minister of Finance
- In office 1983–1987
- Preceded by: Charles Walker
- Succeeded by: Mahendra Chaudhry

Minister of Foreign Affairs and Tourism
- In office 1982–1983
- Preceded by: Kamisese Mara
- Succeeded by: Jonati Mavoa

Speaker of the House of Representatives
- In office 1977–1982
- Preceded by: Vijay R. Singh
- Succeeded by: Tomasi Vakatora

Member of the House of Representatives
- In office 1982–1987
- Preceded by: Solomone Momoivalu
- Succeeded by: Seat abolished
- Constituency: Lomaiviti–Muanikau Fijian Communal
- In office 1973–1982
- Preceded by: Edward Cakobau
- Succeeded by: Seat abolished
- Constituency: Suva East Fijian National

Personal details
- Born: 10 September 1938 Fiji
- Died: 22 September 1987 (aged 49) Sydney, Australia

Mosese Qionibaravi CMG (10 September 1938 – 22 September 1987) was a Fijian chief, civil servant and politician. He served as a member of the House of Representatives from 1973 until his death, also holding the offices of Speaker of the House, Minister of Foreign Affairs, Tourism and Finance, and Deputy Prime Minister.

== Biography ==
Qionibaravi was born in September 1938. He was educated at the Ratu Alifereti Finau Memorial Primary School and then Ratu Kadavulevu School and Queen Victoria School. He subsequently attended the University of Auckland, where he earned a Bachelor of Commerce in 1962 and a Master of Commerce in 1964. After returning to Fiji, he joined the Central Planning Office as an assistant secretary, rising to become Deputy Chief Planning Officer by 1969. In 1970 his wife Anaseini became Fiji's female Senator. He transferred departments to become Permanent Secretary for Finance in 1971. He became a member of the Great Council of Chiefs and served on the Fijian Affairs Board and the Native Land Trust Board.

In 1973 Qionibaravi left the public sector to become managing director of Naviti Investments. In the same year he contested the Suva East by-election as the Alliance Party candidate following the death of incumbent Edward Cakobau and was elected to the House of Representatives. He was re-elected in both elections in 1977 and was appointed Speaker of the House of Representatives. He was made a Companion of the Order of St Michael and St George in the 1979 Birthday Honours, and in 1981 was elected president of the Commonwealth Parliamentary Association and became a Pro Chancellor of the University of the South Pacific, a role he held until 1985.

After being re-elected in 1982 elections from the Lomaiviti–Muanikau constituency, Qionibaravi was appointed Minister of Foreign Affairs and Tourism. In late 1983 he was appointed Minister of Finance following the resignation of Charles Walker. In 1985 he was also appointed Deputy Prime Minister. Although he was re-elected in April 1987, the Alliance Party was defeated and he became an opposition MP until Parliament was dissolved following a military coup. He died in Sydney in September 1987 due to liver problems.
