= Josefata Kamikamica =

Fijian statesman, Deputy Prime Minister, and Minister of Finance

Deputy Prime Minister of Fiji
- In office October 1991 – 1992 Serving with Sitiveni Rabuka
- Prime Minister: Kamisese Mara

Finance Minister of Fiji
- In office 1987–1992
- Prime Minister: Kamisese Mara
- Preceded by: Josua Cavalevu
- Succeeded by: Tomasi Vakatora

Personal details
- Born: 1934
- Died: 16 August 1998 (aged 63–64)
- Party: Soqosoqo ni Vakavulewa ni Taukei; Fijian Association Party
- Spouse: Esiteri Vakalala-Kamikamica

Josefata Nakausabaria Kamikamica (1934–1998) was a Fijian statesman and former Deputy Prime Minister and Minister of Finance.

Kamikamica studied in University of Melbourne and Australian National University. He worked as civil servant, and served as Native Land Trust Board since 1972.

Kamikamica was appointed a Companion of the Order of St Michael and St George (CMG) in the 1982 Birthday Honours.

Kamikamica was appointed to the cabinet of Kamisese Mara interim administration. He was Minister of Finance from 1987 to 1992, and also Deputy Prime Minister until 1992. He was elected to the House of Representatives in the 1992 elections. He lost the leadership race for Soqosoqo ni Vakavulewa ni Taukei party leadership to Sitiveni Rabuka in 1992. He could not work with Rabuka, and formed a new party Fijian Association Party in 1994, but was not successful to win any seats in subsequent parliamentary elections.

Kamikamica died after a stroke in Suva on 16 August 1998 at the age of 64. He was the father of Manoa Kamikamica.
