= Anaseini Qionibaravi =

Fijian politician

Member of the Senate
- In office 1970–1976
- Prime Minister: Kamisese Mara
- Succeeded by: Joeli Nacola

Personal details
- Born: c. 1939 Bua Province, Fiji
- Spouse: Mosese Qionibaravi
- Children: 4

Anaseini Qionibaravi (born c. 1939) was a Fijian politician. She was the first woman to serve in the Senate.

== Biography ==
Qionibaravi was born in Bua Province and was educated at St Mary’s School, Labasa and Adi Cakobau School. She then trained at the Nasinu Teachers College before studying at the Auckland Teachers’ College on a two-year government scholarship, specialising in home economics. Qionibaravi worked as a home economics teacher and radio announcer at Radio Fiji, also becoming the first chair of the Fiji Consumer Council. She was a member of the YWCA.

When the Senate was established in 1970, Qionibaravi was appointed for a six-year term as one of Prime Minister Kamisese Mara's nominees. She was the only woman in the Senate, alongside 21 men.

In 1973 her husband Mosese Qionibaravi was elected to the House of Representatives of Fiji. The couple had four children.

In 1978 she resigned as chair of the Consumer Council, claiming it was underfunded.
