= 2018 Fijian general election =

- 14 November 2018

All 51 seats in the Parliament of Fiji 26 seats needed for a majority
- Opinion polls
- Registered: 637,527
- Turnout: 71.92% (▼12.68pp)
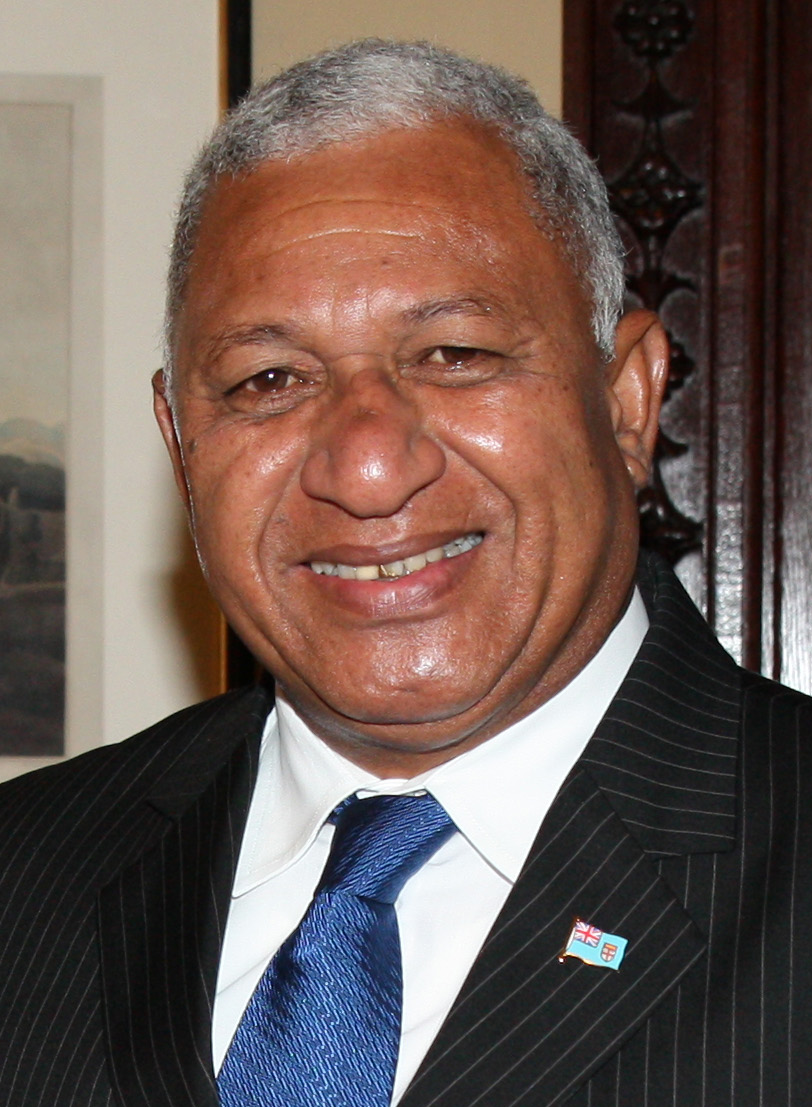

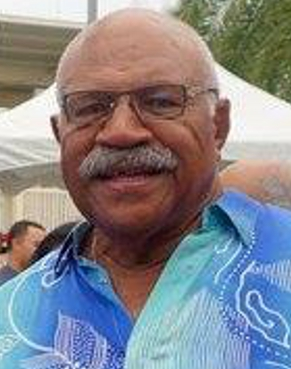

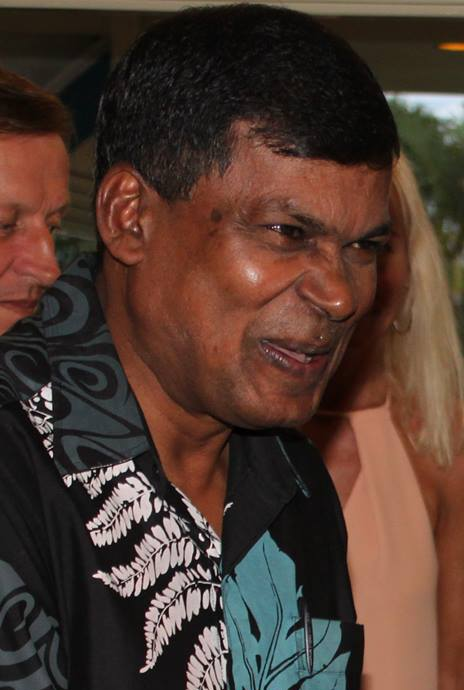
	First party	Second party	Third party
Leader	Frank Bainimarama	Sitiveni Rabuka	Biman Prasad
Party	FijiFirst	SODELPA	NFP
Last election	59.17%, 32 seats	28.18%, 15 seats	5.46%, 3 seats
Seats won	27	21	3
Seat change	▼5	▲6	Steady
Popular vote	227,241	181,072	33,515
Percentage	50.02%	39.85%	7.38%
Swing	▼9.15pp	▲11.67pp	▲1.92pp
Prime Minister before election
Frank Bainimarama
FijiFirst
Subsequent Prime Minister
Frank Bainimarama
FijiFirst

General elections were held in Fiji on 14 November 2018. The result was a victory for the ruling FijiFirst party of Prime Minister Frank Bainimarama, which received just over 50% of the vote and 27 of the 51 seats in Parliament, a loss of five seats. The main opposition party, Social Democratic Liberal Party, gained six seats, whilst the National Federation Party retained its three seats.

The elections also saw female representation in Parliament rise to nearly 20 percent, with 10 of the 51 members being women.

== Background and campaign ==
On 10 March, SODELPA launched their party manifesto for the election in Sydney, making it the first time a Fijian political party has launched their party manifesto overseas. The event attracted many supporters among the Fijian diaspora, especially Fijian Australians.

On 30 September, Prime Minister Frank Bainimarama announced that the elections would be held on 14 November 2018. President Jioji Konrote subsequently dissolved parliament in accordance with section 58(3) of the constitution, on the advice of the Prime Minister.

234 candidates representing six political parties contested in the elections. 56 of the candidates were women. Candidate numbers for the ballot paper were drawn on 18 October. The Labour Party and Freedom Alliance Party presented a combined party list under the Labour Party banner.

During a campaign rally, FijiFirst leader Frank Bainimarama stated that he wanted to win all 51 parliamentary seats and govern without an opposition, arguing that the two main opposition parties represented i-Taukei and Indo-Fijian interests rather than all Fijians. The SODELPA party promised to restore the Great Council of Chiefs within a hundred days if elected, and to consider changing the electoral system to restore communal constituencies. They later explicitly promised to restore the 1997 constitution.

During the election campaign SODELPA leader Sitiveni Rabuka was tried and acquitted on charges of falsely declaring his assets and liabilities to the Supervisor of Elections. An appeal by the Fiji Independent Commission Against Corruption, which could have resulted in Rabuka's disqualification two days from the poll, was dismissed, with FICAC ordered to pay costs. Shortly before the appeal was decided Rabuka was again called in by police on unspecified charges.

On election day, voting was suspended at 26 polling stations due to torrential rain and flooding. Ballots cast at those stations were shredded. Polling recommenced with fresh ballot papers on Saturday 17 November.

== Electoral system ==
The 51 members of Parliament were elected from a single nationwide constituency by open list proportional representation with an electoral threshold of 5%. Seats are allocated using the d'Hondt method.

Prior to the election the Electoral Commission increased the number of seats from 50 to 51 in accordance with section 54 of the Fiji constitution to maintain the ratio of population to seats. The commission determined the ratio in 2014 was one seat for every 17,472 citizens. With the Fiji Bureau of Statistics projecting a population of 886,416 as of 1 March 2017 achieving the same ratio would require 50.73 seats which the commission rounded up to 51 for the 2018 election.

=== Schedule ===
Key dates relating to the general election were as follows:

30 September (Sunday)	Prime Minister Frank Bainimarama announces elections to be held on 14 November 2018.
30 September (Sunday)	President Jioji Konrote dissolves parliament in accordance with section 58(3) of the constitution, on the advice of the Prime Minister.
1 October (Monday)	President Jioji Konrote issues the writ of election
1 October (Monday)	Registration of voters ends at 6 p.m.
2 October (Tuesday)	Candidate nominations open at 8 a.m.
15 October (Monday)	Candidate nominations close at 12 p.m.
24 October (Wednesday)	Postal voting applications close at 5 p.m.
5 November (Monday)	Pre-poll voting begins
10 November (Saturday)	Pre-poll voting ends
12 November (Monday)	Media blackout on campaigning commences at 12.00 a.m. for 48 hours
14 November (Wednesday)	Election Day – polling places open from 7.30 a.m. to 6 p.m.
14 November (Wednesday)	Election Night – provisional results will be progressively released from 6 p.m.
18 November (Sunday)	Official results declared
18 November (Sunday)	President Jioji Konrote receives the Writ of Election from the Electoral Commission.

== Opinion polls ==
=== Approval ratings ===
Pollster(s)	Date	Sample size	Bainimarama			Rabuka			Kepa			Prasad		
Pollster(s)	Date	Sample size	Satisfied	Dissatisfied	Lead	Satisfied	Dissatisfied	Lead	Satisfied	Dissatisfied	Lead	Satisfied	Dissatisfied	Lead
The Fiji Times	11 Feb 2017	1,001	78%	4%	+74%	34%	12%	+22%	44%	10%	+34%	36%	9%	+27%

=== Satisfaction with the government ===
Question: Has this FijiFirst government done a good job in the last four years?
Pollster(s)	Date	Sample size	Yes (%)	No (%)	Unsure (%)	Lead
Fiji Sun	22 Sep 2018	1,000	60%	21%	19%	+39%

=== Preferred Deputy Prime Minister ===
==== National ====
View source data.
Graphical summary of opinion polls for preferred Deputy Prime Minister

Pollster(s)	Date	Sample size	Sayed-Khaiyum	Radrodro	Nawaikula	Tikoduadua	Lead
Fiji Sun	9 Sep 2017		57%	3%	2%	5%	+52%
Fiji Sun	11 Nov 2017	600	51%	3%	7%	7%	+44%
Fiji Sun	20 Jan 2018	600	48%	7%	4%	5%	+41%
Fiji Sun	12 May 2018	1,000	60%	—	21%	19%	+39%

==== Northern Division ====
Pollster(s)	Date	Sample size	Sayed-Khaiyum	Radrodro	Nawaikula	Tikoduadua	Lead
Fiji Sun	9 Sep 2017		38%	19%	17%	7%	+19%

=== Preferred Prime Minister ===
View source data.
Graphical summary of opinion polls for preferred Prime Minister

Pollster(s)	Date	Sample size	Bainimarama	Rabuka	Kepa	Prasad	Chaudhry	Lead
Fiji Sun	29 Jul 2017		59%	13%	14%	—	—	+45%
Fiji Sun	9 Sep 2017		71%	7%	13%	4%	—	+58%
Fiji Sun	11 Nov 2017	600	66%	10%	14%	3%	2%	+52%
Fiji Sun	20 Jan 2018	600	66%	11%	18%	2%	2%	+48%
Fiji Sun	3 Mar 2018	600	68%	11%	11%	5%	0%	+57%
Fiji Sun	24 Mar 2018	600	62%	5%	20%	9%	1%	+42%
Fiji Sun	31 Mar 2018	600	63%	11%	11%	8%	—	+52%
Fiji Sun	13 Oct 2018	100	64%	14%	4%	8%	–	+50%
The Fiji Times	22-24 Oct 2014		68%	24%	—	5%	—	+44%
Fiji Sun	3 Nov 2018	1,000	60%	4%	20%	10%	—	+40%

=== Voting intention ===
View source data.
Graphical summary of opinion polls for voting intention

Pollster(s)	Date	Sample size	FijiFirst	SODELPA	NFP	Unity	HOPE	Labour	Lead
Fiji Sun	11 Nov 2017	600	63%	21%	3%	0%	—	3%	+42%
Fiji Sun	20 Jan 2018	600	61%	26%	2%	1%	—	0%	+35%
Fiji Sun	24 Mar 2018	600	62%	24%	5%	—	—	4%	+38%
Fiji Sun	12 May 2018	1,000	62%	16%	5%	—	—	7%	+46%
Fiji Sun	22 Sep 2018	1,000	66%	13%	2%	9%	5%	5%	+53%
Fiji Sun	13 Oct 2018	100	63%	15%	10%	2%	5%	2%	+48%
Western Force Research	3 Nov 2018	1,118	60%	24%	9%	0%	0%	0%	+36%

== Results ==
Party	Votes	%	+/–	Seats	+/–
FijiFirst	227,241	50.02	–9.15	27	–5
Social Democratic Liberal Party	181,072	39.85	+11.67	21	+6
National Federation Party	33,515	7.38	+1.93	3	0
Unity Fiji Party	6,896	1.52	+1.52	0	New
HOPE	2,811	0.62	+0.62	0	New
Fiji Labour Party	2,800	0.62	–1.73	0	0
Total	454,335	100.00	–	51	+1
Valid votes	454,335	99.08			
Invalid/blank votes	4,197	0.92			
Total votes	458,532	100.00			
Registered voters/turnout	637,527	71.92			
Source: FEO

=== By division ===
Division	FijiFirst	SODELPA	NFP	UFP	HOPE	FLP	Total votes
Central	44.5%	45.4%	7.4%	1.7%	0.5%	0.5%	148,131
Eastern	44.7%	45.6%	7.1%	1.5%	0.6%	0.5%	76,750
Northern	46.0%	45.8%	6.4%	0.7%	0.6%	0.6%	67,560
Western	60.2%	28.7%	7.9%	1.8%	0.7%	0.8%	152,766
Postal votes	44.6%	44.6%	8.3%	1.5%	0.6%	0.4%	9,128
Fiji	50.0%	39.9%	7.4%	1.5%	0.6%	0.6%	454,335
Source: 2018 Election Results

== Aftermath ==
The ruling FijiFirst Party lost five seats, but retained a majority in Parliament. FijiFirst leader Frank Bainimarama blamed poor weather for the loss of votes. Bainimarama was sworn in as Prime Minister on 20 November 2018.

== Reactions ==
Australian foreign minister Marise Payne congratulated Bainimarama's re-election in an official statement.

== See also ==
- List of members of the Parliament of Fiji (2018–2022)
