= Sitiveni Rabuka =

Prime Minister of Fiji (1992–1999; since 2022)

Major General the Honourable Sitiveni Rabuka CF, OBE, MSD
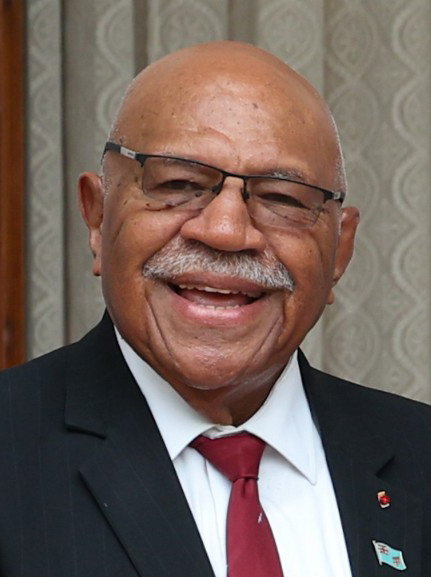
- Rabuka in 2025

Prime Minister of Fiji
- Incumbent
- Assumed office 24 December 2022
- President: Ratu Wiliame Katonivere; Ratu Naiqama Lalabalavu
- Deputy: Viliame Gavoka; Manoa Kamikamica (2022–2025); Biman Prasad (2022–2025)
- Preceded by: Frank Bainimarama
- In office 2 June 1992 – 19 May 1999
- President: Ratu Sir Penaia Ganilau; Ratu Sir Kamisese Mara
- Deputy: Filipe Bole; Timoci Vesikula; Taufa Vakatale
- Preceded by: Ratu Sir Kamisese Mara
- Succeeded by: Mahendra Chaudhry

Leader of the Opposition
- In office 26 November 2018 – 7 December 2020
- Prime Minister: Frank Bainimarama
- Preceded by: Teimumu Kepa
- Succeeded by: Ratu Naiqama Lalabalavu

Leader of SODELPA
- In office 24 June 2016 – 28 November 2020
- Preceded by: Teimumu Kepa
- Succeeded by: Viliame Gavoka

Chairman of the Cakaudrove Provincial Council
- In office 24 May 2001 – 2008
- Preceded by: Ratu Inoke Kubuabola
- Succeeded by: Emitai Boladuadua

1st Chairman of the Great Council of Chiefs
- In office 1999–2001
- Preceded by: Ratu Finau Mara (Note: As Minister for iTaukei Affairs)
- Succeeded by: Ratu Epeli Ganilau

Deputy Prime Minister of Fiji
- In office July 1991 – 1992 Serving with Josefata Kamikamica
- Prime Minister: Kamisese Mara
- Succeeded by: Tomasi Vakatora

Head of the Interim Military Government
- In office 7 October 1987 – 5 December 1987
- Preceded by: Elizabeth II (Queen of Fiji)
- Succeeded by: Penaia Ganilau (president)

5th Commander of the Republic of Fiji Military Forces
- In office 1987 – April 1991
- Preceded by: Ratu Epeli Nailatikau
- Succeeded by: Ratu Epeli Ganilau

Member of the Fijian Parliament for Cakaudrove West
- In office 1999–2001
- Preceded by: Office established
- Succeeded by: Manasa Tugia

Personal details
- Born: 13 September 1948 (age 78) Nakobo, Cakaudrove, Colony of Fiji
- Party: People's Alliance (since 2021)
- Other political affiliations: SVT (1991–2006); SODELPA (2014–2015; 2016–2020)
- Spouse: Suluweti Tuiloma (m. 1975)
- Nicknames: Steve; Rambo

Military service
- Allegiance: Dominion of Fiji; Fiji (since 1987)
- Branch: Fiji Infantry Regiment
- Service years: 1968–1991
- Rank: Major General
- Commands: Fijian Battalion
- Conflict: Lebanese Civil War
- Awards: Companion of the Order of Fiji; Officer of the Order of the British Empire; Officer of the Order of St John; Meritorious Service Decoration; Commander of the Legion of Honour (France); Commandeur of the Order of Tahiti Nui (French Polynesia)

Sitiveni Ligamamada Rabuka CF OBE MSD (Fijian: [sitʃiˈβeni ramˈbuka]; born 13 September 1948) is a Fijian politician, sportsman, and former soldier who has been serving as Prime Minister of Fiji since 24 December 2022. He was the instigator of two military coups in 1987. He was democratically elected as Prime Minister of Fiji, serving from 1992 to 1999, and again in 2022, leading a three-party coalition. He also served as Chairman of the Great Council of Chiefs from 1999 to 2001, and later as Chairman of the Cakaudrove Provincial Council from 2001 to 2008.

Rabuka was elected as leader of the Social Democratic Liberal Party in 2016, succeeding Leader of the Opposition Ro Teimumu Kepa, who publicly disapproved of Rabuka's nomination to replace her. He was appointed as the leader of the opposition to Parliament in 2018, following the 2018 election defeat. He was the only nomination for the position, and his nomination was moved by Ro Teimumu Kepa and seconded by Biman Prasad. He was ousted as SODELPA leader by Viliame Gavoka in a leadership contest. Rabuka resigned from parliament in 2020, citing that he would no longer be an obstacle to the bipartisan approach to be taken by the leaders of Fiji to create harmony and progress, and unity in Fiji. He formed a new political party in 2020, named Peoples Alliance, to contest the 2022 election.

== Early life ==
The son of Kolinio Epeli Vanuacicila Rabuka and Salote Lomaloma Rabuka, Rabuka was raised in the village of Drekeniwai in eastern Viti Levu, Fiji's largest island. He was educated at Queen Victoria School, where he became the head boy in his final year. He represented Fiji in shot put, hammer throw, discus and the decathlon at the 1974 British Commonwealth Games and has also represented Fiji national rugby union team in the 1970s.

== Military career ==
Rabuka was trained initially in New Zealand army schools, from which he graduated in 1973, and completed a professional development course at Royal Military Academy Sandhurst. He did postgraduate work at the Indian Defence Services Staff College in 1979, and at the Australian Joint Services Staff College in 1982. He was a senior operation plans manager for UNIFIL peacekeeping troops in Lebanon in 1980 and 1981. On his return home, he was appointed Army chief of staff. From 1982 to 1987, he was an operations and training officer for the Fijian army, except for a two-year absence (1983–1985) when he commanded the Fijian Battalion as part of the Multinational Force and Observers peacekeeping force in the Sinai.

For his service in Lebanon, Rabuka was awarded the Legion of Honour in 1980, and was made an Officer of the Order of the British Empire by Queen Elizabeth II in the 1981 Birthday Honours List.

=== 1987 Fijian coups d'état ===
Rabuka, by now a colonel, emerged suddenly from obscurity on 14 May 1987 when he staged the first of two military coups, allegedly to reassert ethnic Fijian supremacy, following the 1987 election, which had brought to power an ethnic Fijian-led government in which half the ministers were Indo-Fijian (ethnic Indian). Deposing the elected government, he handed power over to the governor-general, Penaia Ganilau, a high chief whom he expected to implement ethnic Fijian interests. When, however, Ganilau attempted to reinstate the abrogated constitution, Rabuka carried out a second coup on 28 September that year. At first he pledged his allegiance to the Queen, but on 7 October he issued a decree (Declaration – Republic of Fiji Decree 1987 No. 8) proclaiming a republic, abolishing the 113-year link to the British Monarchy. He handed over power on 5 December to an interim administration, headed by Ganilau as President and Ratu Sir Kamisese Mara as prime minister, but remained Commander of the Army and Minister of Home Affairs, the National Youth Service, and the Auxiliary Army Service. Ganilau and Mara did not feel strong enough to dismiss Rabuka, but the public support they enjoyed as high chiefs was such that he did not feel strong enough to depose them. An uneasy truce existed between Ganilau and Mara on the one hand and Rabuka on the other.

During the time of the coup, Rabuka was sometimes referred to in the press as "Colonel Steve Rambo."

In 2006, Rabuka finally apologised for having executed the coups. Fiji Live reported on 28 March that Rabuka had told India's Ahmedabad Newsline, while visiting India for medical treatment, that he regretted his role in the coups, which he described as "democratically wrong".

== Political career ==
=== Prime Minister of Fiji (1992–1999) ===
In April 1991 Rabuka resigned as commander of the armed forces in order join the cabinet of Kamisese Mara as one of the Deputy Prime Ministers. Following the adoption in 1990 of a new constitution that guaranteed ethnic Fijian domination of the political system, Rabuka was chosen to lead the newly formed Soqosoqo ni Vakavulewa ni Taukei in 1991. This party won the parliamentary election of 1992 and Rabuka became Prime Minister. His government was weakened from the outset, however, by a leadership challenge by former Finance Minister Josefata Kamikamica. In 1994, Kamikamica left the party with five of his supporters, depriving Rabuka of a parliamentary majority. A parliamentary election to resolve the impasse was held three years early; the Fijian Political Party won a plurality but fell two seats short of an absolute majority in the 70-member House of Representatives. Rabuka formed a coalition with the small General Voters Party, a small party supported almost entirely by general electors, who comprised Europeans, Chinese, and other minorities. He also agreed to negotiate with moderate leaders of the Indo-Fijian community to draft a controversial new Constitution, which removed most of the provisions that had biased the political system in favour of indigenous Fijians.

The elections of 1999 were the first in many years to see real competition between ethnic Fijians and Indo-Fijians for power. Rabuka lost these elections, and was replaced by Mahendra Chaudhry, the first Indo-Fijian Prime Minister.

=== 2000 Fijian coup d'état ===
Following his electoral defeat, Rabuka was elected Chairman of the Great Council of Chiefs. He was forced to relinquish this post in 2001, however, in the wake of allegations made against him by former President Ratu Sir Kamisese Mara of complicity in the Fiji coup of 2000, which deposed both Mara and the Indo-Fijian Prime Minister, Mahendra Chaudhry, on 19 May 2000. Claiming that the coup leader George Speight – who was then in custody and was later convicted of treason – was only a front, Mara appeared on the Close-Up television program on 30 April 2001 and revealed that on 21 May 2000, two days after the coup, he had confronted Rabuka and Isikia Savua, the police chief, about their possible involvement in it. "I could see it in their faces," Mara declared. Ratu Mara told the programme that within half an hour of Speight's forcible occupation of the Parliament, Rabuka had telephoned Government House (the official residence of the President) to offer to form a government. He further alleged that the Counter Revolutionary Warfare Unit of the Army had been involved in the coup after receiving training on a farm owned by Rabuka.

In an interview with Fiji's Daily Post on 2 July 2001, Rabuka angrily denied the allegations, saying that they were the ravings of "an angry old man" and "very unbecoming of a national leader and of a statesman." The charges, however, were repeated on the floor of the Senate on 23 October 2004 by Adi Koila Nailatikau, Mara's daughter.

Former Attorney-General Sir Vijay Singh published a memoir in 2006, supporting the allegations against Rabuka. Fiji Village quoted Singh on 18 August 2006 as saying, at the launch of his memoir, "Speaking Out", that Rabuka had told him personally that he was one of the ring-leaders and that real target of the coup was not the Chaudhry government, but Ratu Mara, and that Mara had voiced his own suspicions about Rabuka to Singh. "On Monday (following the Friday coup) I had a telephone conversation with the President Ratu Sir Kamisese Mara. He had no doubts that it was Mr Sitiveni Rabuka and Mr Isikia Savua", the then Commissioner of Police "who had organised the miserable affair at parliamentary complex," Singh said. Rabuka refused to comment on Singh's allegations, citing sub judice.

=== Alleged role in 2000 mutiny ===
Rabuka was also accused of instigating or supporting the mutiny that took place at Suva's Queen Elizabeth Barracks on 2 November 2000. In an interview with the Fiji Times on 12 November 2000, the Military Commander, Commodore Frank Bainimarama charged that while the revolt was in progress, Rabuka had visited the barracks with his army uniform in the car, ready to take over command of the army. He also allegedly started issuing orders to soldiers. "Rabuka's words to one of my colonels at the height of the shootings raised my suspicions," Bainimarama said. "He said the Colonel should listen to his instructions. He also criticised my leadership." Bainimarama accused Rabuka of leading soldiers astray by using "confusing" and "deceiving" words.

Bainimarama also accused Rabuka of having "politicised" the Counter Revolutionary Warfare (CRW) unit, which he (Rabuka) had founded as a bodyguard in 1987, to favour both the mutiny and the earlier takeover of parliament in May. Members of the CRW were involved in both the May coup and the November mutiny.

Bainimarama's version was supported by Lieutenant Colonel Viliame Seruvakula, who led the counteroffensive to put down the mutiny. On 13 November 2000, he said that rebels interrogated by the military had implicated Rabuka. He accused Rabuka of trying to take civilians into the barracks to act as human shields for the mutineers, and stated that Rabuka's intention was to "claim military leadership and ultimately overthrow the Government of the day."

Rabuka, a retired officer, denied supporting the mutiny, but refused to comment on an accusation from Bainimarama that he had called a meeting of senior officers loyal to him to depose Bainimarama.

=== 2006 arrest ===
Rabuka's denials of the allegations against him did not end the controversy. On 14 May 2005, The New Zealand Herald reported in its Weekend Herald edition that the Fiji police force was close to making a decision on whether to charge certain unnamed individuals, one of whom the Herald believed to be Rabuka. The report quoted Police Commissioner Andrew Hughes as saying that a major hindrance to their investigation was a "cone of silence" among the close associates of the suspects.

Rabuka was arrested on 11 May 2006 on charges of inciting Lieutenant Colonel Viliame Seruvakula to commit a military mutiny on 2 November 2000, in the aftermath of the 2000 coup. He was alleged to have approached Seruvakula back on 4 July that year, with a view to overthrowing the Military Commander, Commodore Frank Bainimarama. He entered no plea, was released on $F 1000 bail, and was required to surrender his passport. He was ordered to report to the Namadi police station between 6 am and 6 pm every Monday and Saturday, and was warned not to try to influence any witnesses, according to a Fiji Live report. It was announced on 17 June that at the request of the Director of Prosecutions, the case had been transferred to the High Court due to the serious nature of the charge.

Rabuka appeared in the High Court on 30 June and pleaded not guilty, Fiji Village reported. The trial was set for 20 October, but this was later changed to 6 November.

Fiji Village reported on 6 September that Rabuka had been refused permission to travel to Papua New Guinea for a golf tournament. Judge Gerard Winter ruled that the charges against Rabuka were serious and that he must not be allowed to abscond. Permission to leave Fiji would therefore be granted for medical emergencies only; the golf tournament did not qualify, he declared.

On 11 December 2006, Rabuka was found not guilty on two counts of inciting a mutiny. The judge cast a deciding vote after the panel of assessors was split.

=== 2006 parliamentary election ===
In early 2005, Rabuka ruled himself out of contesting the 2006 parliamentary election, but on 7 May said he was reconsidering, following appeals from Fijian businessmen and former politicians to be part of a move to unite all ethnically Fijian parties in a joint ticket to contest the next election. "I am genuinely interested because I have always been for Fijian unity," he said. He has stressed that he believes that political unity among indigenous Fijians is essential to prevent the election of an Indo-Fijian dominated government in 2006. He admitted, however, that he was seen as "a stumbling block" by many, but added, "I want to change all that." On 29 May, he said that political unity among the Fijian people should not be looked at half-heartedly as a possibility but wholeheartedly as a need. He accused Prime Minister Laisenia Qarase, who has also called for unity among ethnic Fijians, of hypocrisy, saying that in the 1990s there was only one mainstream Fijian party, but that others had split from it and founded numerous competing groups. Qarase and his Soqosoqo Duavata ni Lewenivanua (SDL) were implied to be among those responsible for the disunity.

On 21 August, Rabuka said he was of the opinion that Prime Ministers defeated at the polls should not stand again. Former Prime Ministers remaining politically active led to instability, he said, pointing to recent political upheavals in Vanuatu and the Solomon Islands as examples. "It is healthy for party leaders who become prime ministers after being defeated at general elections to take the responsibility for the defeat and bow out of active politics and just become an adviser or remain as a party supporter but not in the front seat running for another election."

On 19 October, Rabuka said that the current parliamentary team representing Cakaudrove enjoyed his full support. He said he would follow the will of the people, however, in deciding whether or not to contest the 2006 elections. Current members of Parliament from Cakaudrove include Ratu Naiqama Lalabalavu, the paramount chief of the Tovata Confederacy, Manasa Tugia, and Niko Nawaikula.

Despite his role in the formation (30 July 2005) of the Grand Coalition for Fiji, an electoral pact of five political parties supported mostly by indigenous Fijians, to contest the 2006 elections, Rabuka expressed doubts about its workability on 27 December. Public feuding threatened to derail the project, he warned. The recent attack on the 1997 Constitution by Nationalist Vanua Tako Lavo Party leader Iliesa Duvuloco had upset him, he said.

At the same time, Rabuka said that another coup would be unlikely and that given the disunity among indigenous Fijians, attitudes towards a non-indigenous Prime Minister would not matter. The multi-party Cabinet provisions of the Constitution could not be implemented if either the SDL or the Fiji Labour Party (FLP) won the election, he said; if the two parties found the provision unworkable, they should have amended the Constitution and had had five years in which to do so.

On 7 February 2006, Rabuka said that he was still considering whether to contest the forthcoming elections. He thought it "unwise", without elaborating, to contest seats in his native Cakaudrove, or those held by members of the Grand Coalition, and might contest only if an urban open constituency was available. He considered, however, that given his length of time out of politics, making a comeback would be difficult. He also called for all political parties to be, and be seen to be, representing all ethnic groups. Otherwise, the racial faultline in Fijian politics would not be overcome, he said.

In the end, Rabuka decided not to contest the election, and his party fielded only one candidate.

=== 2006 Fijian coup d'état ===
The Fiji Times reported on 15 December 2006 that Rabuka stated that he saw no possibility that Laisenia Qarase, deposed as Prime Minister in a 2006 Fijian coup d'état on 5 December, would return to power. He denied supporting the coup, but said that Qarase, along with deposed President Ratu Josefa Iloilo, were weak leaders who had done nothing to forestall the coup by negotiating with the Military while there was still time. Qarase should have seen the coup coming, Rabuka said.

Following the coup, he criticised Bainimarama's refusal to hold elections, saying it was because Bainimarama wanted to "[keep] away from the role of governing, people and groups he has pre-determined should not govern."

=== 2014 parliamentary election ===
Rabuka mostly kept a low profile after the 2006 coup. In June 2013 however, he came out and said that he would consider running in the proposed 2014 national elections, if they went ahead. He sought the leadership of the newly formed Social Democratic Liberal Party (SoDelPa), the successor party to former Prime Minister Qarase's Soqosoqo Duavata ni Lewenivanua (SDL), which the Military-backed interim government had dissolved, but was rebuffed after he said that he had no regrets about the 1987 coups. "I had to do what I had to do in 1987," he told the Fiji Sun on 30 January 2014. A subsequent bid for the deputy leadership of the party also ran into stiff opposition. He also sought nomination as a parliamentary candidate, but on 24 August, SoDelPa announced that it had decided not to nominate him. Despite this, he is still a member and supporter of the party.

=== Leader of the Opposition and 2018 parliamentary election ===
In June 2016, Ro Teimumu Kepa announced that she was standing down as leader of SODELPA. She was replaced by Sitiveni Rabuka. Rabuka led the party into the 2018 elections.

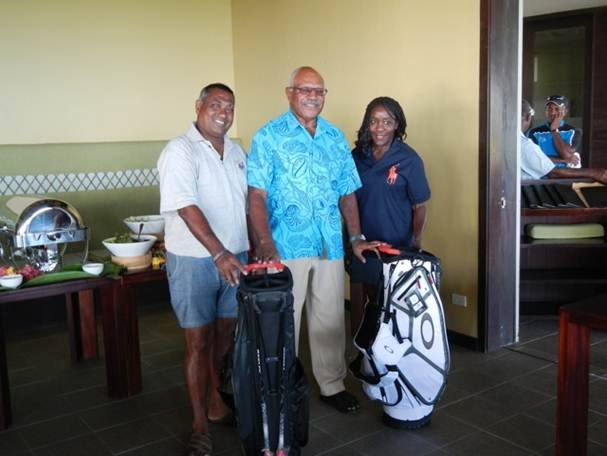
U.S Ambassador to Fiji Frankie Reed (r) with Sitiveni Rabuka (c).

On 25 May 2018, Rabuka was charged by anti-corruption agency Fiji Independent Commission Against Corruption in relation to the declaration of his assets and liabilities as required under the Political Parties Registration, Conduct, Funding and Disclosures Act. He was tried during the election campaign and acquitted. An appeal by the Fiji Independent Commission Against Corruption, which could have resulted in Rabuka's disqualification two days from the poll, was dismissed, with FICAC ordered to pay costs. Shortly before the appeal was decided Rabuka was again called in by police on unspecified charges.

Rabuka won 77,040 votes in the election, gaining a seat in parliament. In a post-election interview, he said that it was unfortunate that the leaders of the two main parties were coup-leaders and that there needed to be "a move away from coup profiled people".

On 26 May 2020, Sodelpa had been suspended for the breach of the Political Parties Act for 60 days effective immediately. All appointees have been declared null and void, and now have 60 days to rectify all issues or face deregistration. Thus, Rabuka can not represent himself as the leader of Sodelpa after the registrar declared the party suspension. On 29 June 2020, Sodelpa suspension was lifted.

=== 2020 SODELPA leadership contest ===
On 27 November 2020, Rabuka was ousted as SODELPA leader in a leadership contest. There was speculation that Rabuka would form a new party after his ousting as leader, however he later denied that he would form a new party and would continue to support SODELPA. Gavoka was formally recognised as SODELPA leader on 28 November during the party's AGM meeting. Prominent lawyer Filimoni Vosarogo was chosen as the new Deputy Leader. 21 members of the SODELPA Management Board voted for Gavoka while 20 members voted for Rabuka. The party's caucus was said to be evenly divided over whether the leadership change was the correct course of action.

On 7 December, Rabuka resigned from Parliament and his position as Opposition Leader of Parliament. He made the announcement while responding to the opening of the 2020–2021 Parliament Session by President Jioji Konrote.

On 25 July 2021, he was arrested by Fijian police after criticising government moves to amend land legislation.

=== Prime Minister of Fiji (2022–present) ===
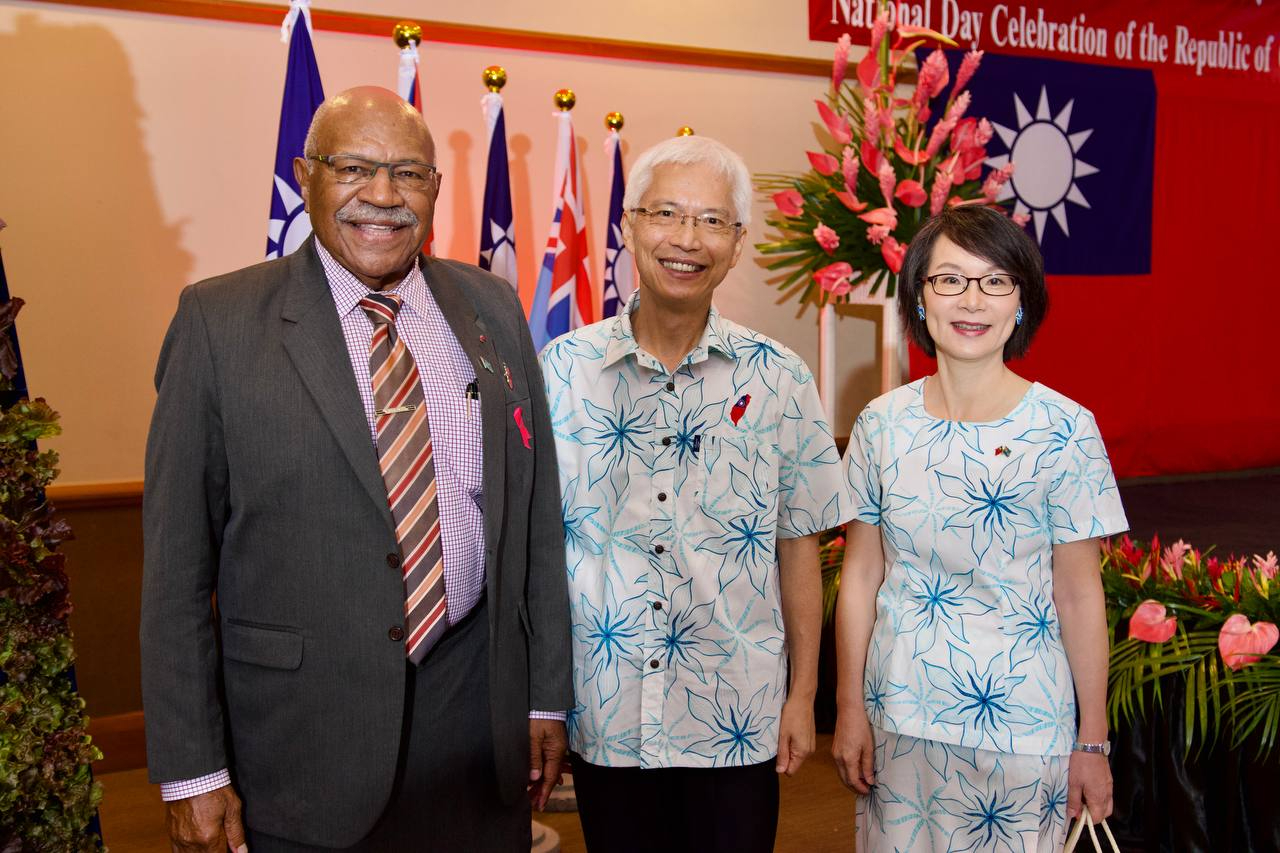
Rabuka with Taiwanese diplomat Joseph Chow, 6 October 2022

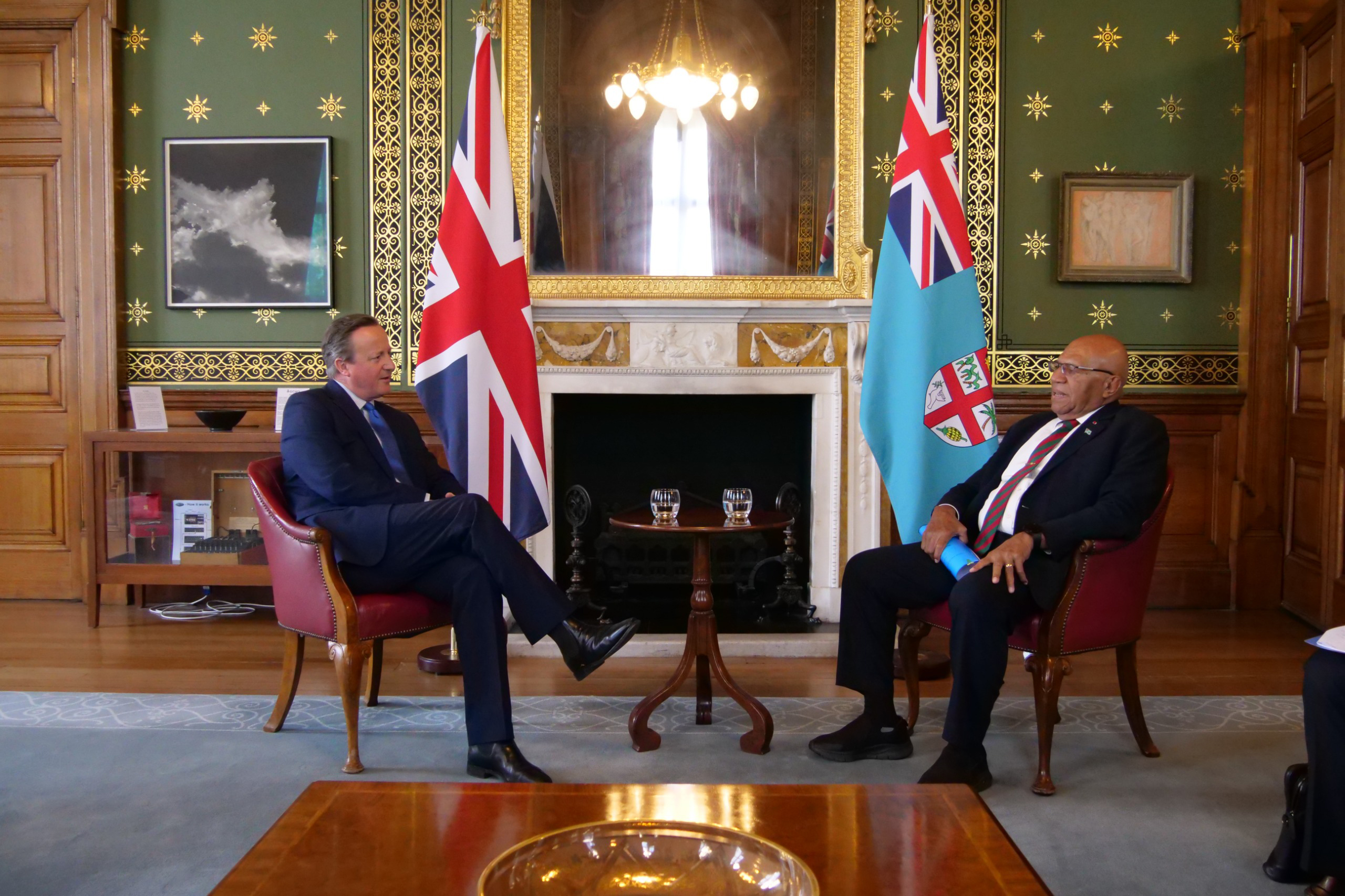
Rabuka with British Foreign Secretary David Cameron, 10 May 2024

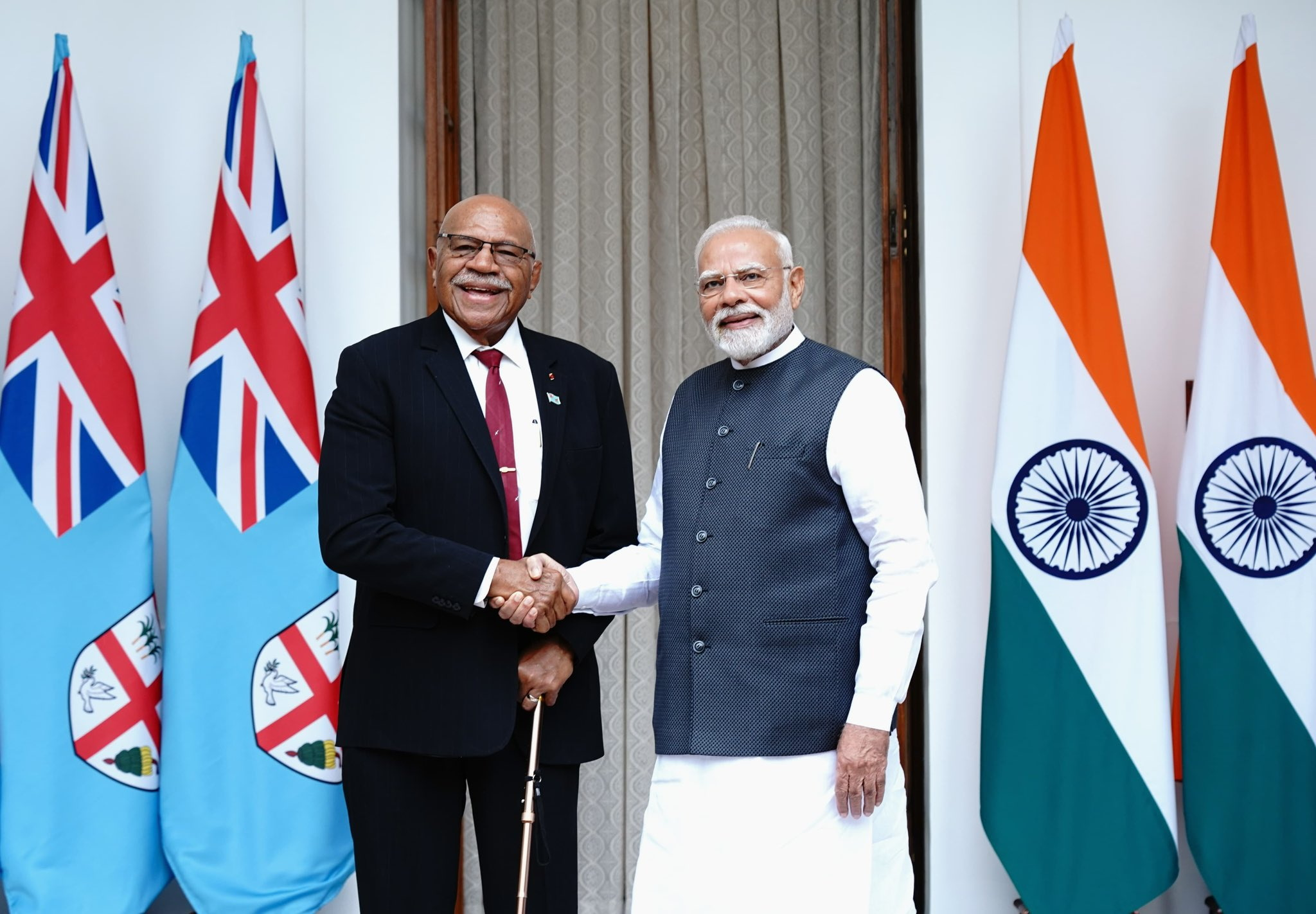
Rabuka and Indian Prime Minister Narendra Modi, 25 August 2025

Rabuka formed a new political party in 2021, named the People's Alliance (PA), to contest the 2022 election. The People's Alliance became the second largest party following the 2022 election, and managed to successfully oust Frank Bainimarama after 16 years of rule, forming a coalition government with SODELPA and the National Federation Party (NFP). Rabuka subsequently became the prime minister-designate. He had been summoned to the police station after questioning the results and calling for a military intervention, despite observers calling the election free and fair. After the NFP-PA coalition formed a government with SODELPA, Rabuka was sworn in as prime minister on 24 December. As part of the coalition agreement, three deputy prime ministers assumed office, NFP leader Biman Prasad, SODELPA leader Viliame Gavoka and Manoa Kamikamica. Rabuka's other ministerial portfolios included information and public enterprises, civil service, foreign affairs and climate change.

On 26 December 2022, Rabuka approved the return of USP Vice-Chancellor Pal Ahluwalia and Padma Lal, wife of the late Professor Brij Lal who were expelled from Fiji by Bainimarama's government.

On 20 January 2023, Rabuka travelled to Kiribati for his first official state visit where he met President Taneti Maamau. The meeting centred on enhancing diplomatic ties and fostering unity within the Blue Pacific region. Previously, Kiribati withdrew from the Pacific Islands Forum in July 2022.

In May 2024, Rabuka, whilst visiting the United Kingdom, presented an official apology to King Charles III, for the 1987 military coup that lead to the abolition of the Fijian Monarchy. Rabuka left open the possibility of Fiji reinstating the Crown, stating to parliament: “If there was any wish for Fiji to return to the realm, as her late Majesty had told me and as His Majesty said to me last week, let it be the will of the people.”

In January 2025, Rabuka said that he would disclose the names of individuals behind the 1987 coups before the Fiji Truth and Reconciliation Commission.

Rabuka is a supporter of Israel. In June 2025, he voicied support for Israel in the Iran–Israel war, saying, "They cannot survive if there is a big threat capability within range of Israel. Whatever [Israel] are doing now can be seen as pre-emptive, knocking it out before it's fired on you." In September 2025, Rabuka opened the Fijian Embassy in Jerusalem and met with Israeli Prime Minister Benjamin Netanyahu.

In January 2026 he travelled to New Zealand for medical treatment, with Filimoni Vosarogo acting as prime minister in his absence.

== Manager of the Pacific Islanders rugby union team ==
In October 2008, it was reported that Rabuka would be the manager of the Pacific Islanders rugby union team during its tour of Europe.

== Personal life ==
Rabuka is Christian. He married Suluweti Tuiloma at RFMF officers mess in Nabua on 10 April 1975. In 2000, he publicly admitted that he had been unfaithful to her, both before and after their marriage, and that he had fathered three children by two different women whilst engaged to Suluweti.

== Honours ==
- Fiji:
  - Companions of the Order of Fiji (CF)
  - Meritorious Service Decoration (MSD)
- France:
  - Commander of the National Order of the Legion of Honour
- French Polynesia:
  - Commander of the Order of Tahiti Nui
- Papua New Guinea:
  - Grand Companion of the Order of Logohu (GCL) - 2026
- United Kingdom:
  - Honorary Officer of the Most Venerable Order of Saint John (OStJ)
  - Officer of the Most Excellent Order of the British Empire (OBE), 1981 Birthday Honours

== See also ==
- List of current heads of state and government
- List of heads of the executive by approval rating

== Notes ==
Military offices
| Preceded by Epeli Nailatikau | Commander of the Republic of Fiji Military Forces; 1987–1992 | Succeeded by Epeli Ganilau |
Political offices
| Preceded by Kamisese Mara | Prime Minister of Fiji; 1992–1999 | Succeeded by Mahendra Chaudhry |
| Preceded by Finau Mara | Chairman of the Great Council of Chiefs; 1999–2001 | Succeeded by Epeli Ganilau |
| Preceded by Inoke Kubuabola | Chairman of the Cakaudrove Provincial Council; 2002–2008 | Succeeded by Emitai Boladuadua |
| Preceded by Teimumu Kepa | Leader of the Opposition; 2018–2020 | Succeeded by Naiqama Lalabalavu |
| Preceded by Frank Bainimarama | Prime Minister of Fiji; 2022–present | Incumbent |
| Preceded by Frank Bainimarama | Minister for Foreign Affairs; 2022–present | Incumbent |
Party political offices
| Preceded by Teimumu Kepa | Leader of SODELPA; 2018–2020 | Succeeded by Viliame Gavoka |
| New political party | Leader of the People's Alliance; 2021–present | Incumbent |
