= Fiji Independent Commission Against Corruption =

The Fiji Independent Commission Against Corruption (FICAC) is the country's mandated law enforcement agency to investigate and prosecute public sector corruption, as well as educate society on understanding and reporting corruption.

It was established by the FICAC Act No 11 of 2007, and began operations in April of the same year.

The Constitution of the Republic of Fiji stipulates that the Commission may investigate, institute and conduct criminal proceedings, take over investigations and criminal proceedings that fall under its responsibility and functions as prescribed by law, and which may have been initiated by another person or authority and discontinue, at any stage before judgment is delivered, criminal proceedings instituted or conducted by it.

Until 2023 FICAC was headed by a Deputy Commissioner, who is appointed by the President of Fiji. In 2023 Mr Rashmi Aslam was appointed FICAC's first Commissioner. Mr Aslam was appointed Deputy Commissioner after the retirement of Mr George Langman in 2019. Mr Aslam served as the Acting Deputy Commissioner from April 2019 until his official appointment as the Deputy Commissioner in May 2020. Mr Aslam Resigned on the 5th of September 2023. On the 22 of September 2023 Ratu David Toganivalu was appointed Acting Commissioner but died on Sunday the 1st of October 2023. The position of Commissioner is currently vacant.

== Function ==
The FICAC Act No. 11 and the Prevention of Bribery Act No. 12 of 2007 gives the Commission unique powers to investigate, advise and prosecute cases involving public sector corruption.

The commission also has powers to investigate and prosecute breaches under the Crimes Act of 2009, Electoral (Registration of Voters) Act No. 54 of 2012, Political Parties Act No. 4 of 2013, and the Electoral Act of 2014. It is the primary objective of FICAC to promote the integrity and accountability of public administration and educating and enlisting public support to combat corruption.

FICAC acceded to the United Nations Convention Against Corruption (UNCAC) on 14 May 2008 and volunteered for a Pilot Review Program by Serbia and France in 2009.

In 2012, Fiji became one of the first 28 State Parties to be reviewed on its implementation of UNCAC by Bangladesh and the United States of America in a peer review process.

== FACE ==
The Fiji Anti-Corruption and Ethics Centre was created in 2017 to provide its viewers with access to anti-corruption information and education materials.

Visitors to the page can read and download annual reports, statistics, anti-corruption policies and all published work of the commission.

This online resource centre acts as an avenue for building a strong brand amongst its stakeholders and provide a platform for exchanging ideas and proposals to tackle corruption.

Anti-corruption policy templates available on this page can assist organisations who have yet to develop any system of internal controls to identify and prevent corruption.

The Commission acknowledges and realises that information is absolutely vital to creating a culture of empowerment and that once this is achieved, there will be more people speaking out and against corruption in the country.

== Reporting corruption ==
Anyone wishing to report suspected corrupt activity can visit the FICAC website to lodge it online.
