= Parliament of Fiji =

National legislature of the Republic of Fiji

Coordinates: 18.145858°S 178.424413°E

Parliament of the Republic of Fiji Palimedi ni Matanitu Tugalala o Viti (Fijian) फिजी गणराज्य की संसद (Fiji Hindi)
- 8th Republic Parliament of Fiji

Type
- Type: Unicameral

Leadership
- Speaker: Filimone Jitoko since 12 November 2024
- Prime Minister of Fiji: Sitiveni Rabuka, PA since 24 December 2022
- Leader of the Opposition: Inia Seruiratu, Independent since 29 March 2023
- Secretary-General: Jeanette Emberson since 17 September 2021

Structure
- Seats: 55 members
- Political groups: Government (29): People's Alliance (21); NFP (5); SODELPA (3); Opposition (26): Independents (26) (Note: Independents (16); PFP (10))

Elections
- Voting system: Open-list proportional representation in a single nationwide constituency using the D'Hondt method with a 5% electoral threshold
- Last election: 14 December 2022
- Next election: By 6 February 2027

Meeting place
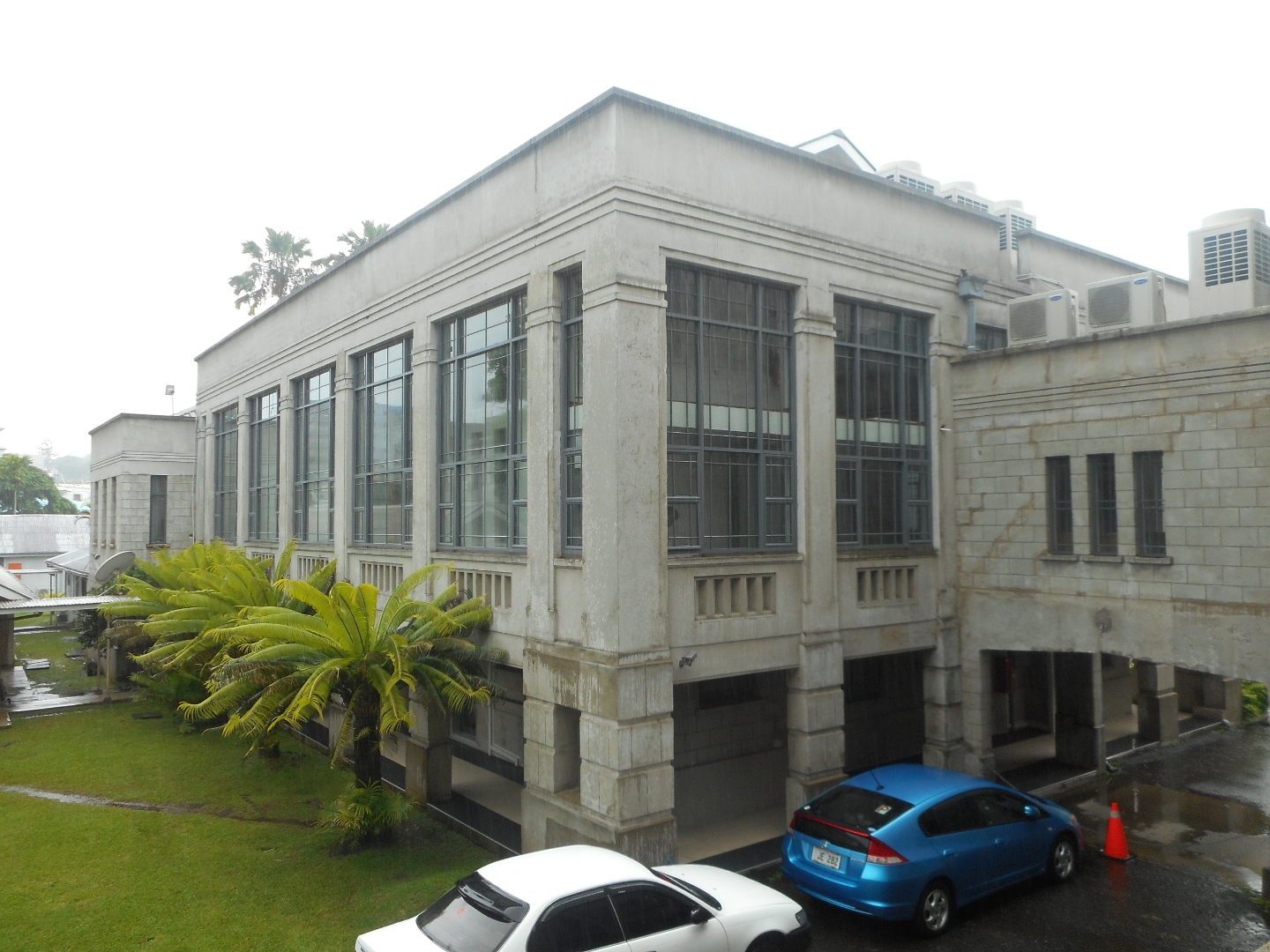
- Government Buildings, Suva

Website
- www.parliament.gov.fj

The Parliament of the Republic of Fiji is the unicameral legislature of the Republic of Fiji. It consists of 55 members elected every 4 years using open list proportional representation in one multi-member nationwide constituency.

== History ==
=== Establishment ===
The Fijian Parliament dates from 10 October 1970, when Fiji became independent from the United Kingdom. The Parliament replaced the former colonial legislative body, the Legislative Council, which had existed in various forms throughout the entire colonial period. A grandfather clause in the 1970 Constitution, which was adopted on independence, provided for the old Legislative Council to be renamed as the House of Representatives and remain in office, pending the first post-independence elections in 1972.

=== Interruptions ===
Since independence, Parliamentary rule has been interrupted three times. The first interruption was from 1987 through 1992, owing to two coups d'état in 1987 instigated by Lieutenant Colonel Sitiveni Rabuka. The second interruption occurred when a coup in 2000 attempted by George Speight rendered the parliamentary system unworkable and resulted in Parliament's dissolution. A general election in 2001 restored the democratic system. The Republic of Fiji Military Forces under the leadership of Frank Bainimarama overthrew the government again in 2006. No further elections would be held until the September 2014 election.

=== Composition ===
The composition of Parliament has changed over the years. From 1972 to 1987, there were 52 Representatives and 22 Senators. In 1992, Parliament was enlarged to 70 Representatives and 34 Senators, figures marginally adjusted in 1999 to provide for 71 Representatives and 32 Senators. 25 of these were elected by universal suffrage. The remaining 46 were reserved for Fiji's ethnic communities and were elected from communal electoral rolls: 23 Fijians, 19 Indo-Fijians, 1 Rotuman, and 3 "General electors" (Europeans, Chinese, and other minorities). The upper chamber of the parliament, the Senate, had 32 members, formally appointed by the President on the nomination of the Great Council of Chiefs (14), the Prime Minister (9), the Leader of the Opposition (8), and the Rotuman Islands Council (1).

The Senate was less powerful than the House of Representatives; the Senate could not initiate legislation, but it could reject or amend it. The Senate's powers over financial bills were more restricted: it could veto them in their entirety, but could not amend them. The House of Representatives could override a Senatorial veto by passing the bill a second time in the parliamentary session immediately following the one in which it was rejected by the Senate, after a minimum period of six months. Amendments to the Constitution were excepted: the veto of the Senate was absolute. Following the passage of a bill by the House of Representatives, the Senate had 21 days (7 days in the case of a bill classified as "urgent") to approve, amend, or reject it; if at the expiry of that period the Senate had done nothing about it, it was deemed to have passed the bill. As a result of the parliament building having only one debating chamber, the Senate and House of Representatives used the same chamber at different times.

=== Unicameral system ===
The 2013 Constitution promulgated by the military-backed interim government abolished the Senate and the House of Representatives, instituting a single-chamber 50-member Parliament. Section 54(2) of the Constitution requires the Fiji Electoral Commission to review the composition of the parliament at least one year before a general election and may if necessary increase or decrease the total number of members. In its review the commission will ensure that ratio of members to the population is the same as the ratio at the date of the first general election under this Constitution. Furthermore, the commission is required to consider the most recent census, the Register of Voters or any other official information available when undertaking its review. Accordingly, the Parliament had 50 seats up for election in 2014, 51 in 2018, and 55 in 2022.

== Structure ==
The Parliament of Fiji consists of 55 members (plus a speaker) and is led by the prime minister, who is the leader of the largest party of government. The current Parliament was elected in the 2022 election, with a coalition of the People's Alliance, the National Federation Party (NFP), and the Social Democratic Liberal Party (SODELPA) holding a majority of 29 seats. FijiFirst, led by Frank Bainimarama, holds 26 seats and is the sole opposition party. The current prime minister is Sitiveni Rabuka.

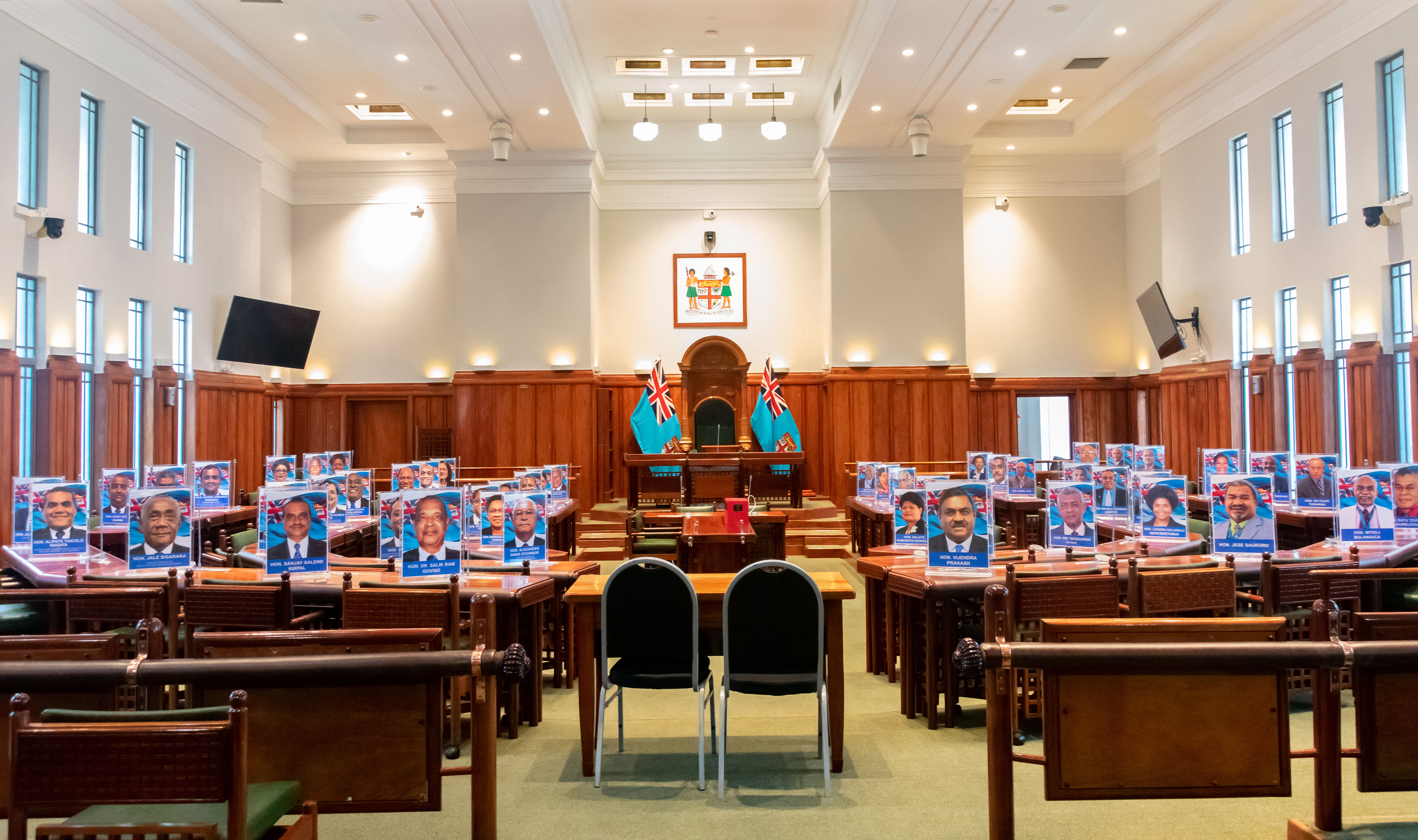
Fiji Parliament Chambers (April 2019)

=== Speakers ===
The salary of the speaker is FJ$150,000 annually.

Image	Name	Entered office	Left office	Notes
	Jiko Luveni	6 October 2014	22 December 2018	Died in office
	Ratu Epeli Nailatikau	11 February 2019	24 December 2022	
	Ratu Naiqama Lalabalavu	24 December 2022	12 November 2024	
	Filimone Jitoko	12 November 2024	Incumbent	

== See also ==
- Politics of Fiji
- Legislative Council of Fiji before 1970
- House of Representatives of Fiji from 1970 to 2006
- Senate of Fiji from 1970 to 2006
- List of parliaments of Fiji from 1970 to present
- List of legislatures by country
