= Japanese research ship Shunkotsu Maru =

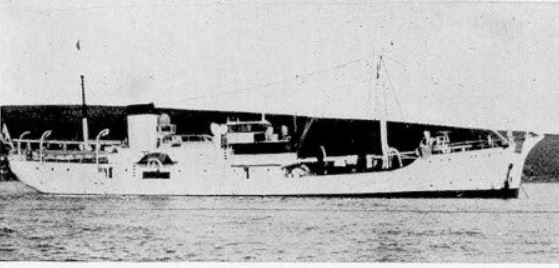
- Pre-war image of Japanese fishing industry inspection ship Shunkotsu Maru

History

Empire of Japan
- Name: Shunkotsu Maru
- Builder: Yokohama Ship Co., Ltd.
- Laid down: 25 March 1928
- Launched: 14 July 1928
- Sponsored by: Japanese Ministry of Agriculture and Forestry (農林省)
- Acquired: requisitioned by Imperial Japanese Navy, 2 November 1941
- Identification: 33965
- Notes: Call sign: JQUB

General characteristics
- Class & type: Naval trawler
- Tonnage: 531.7 gross register tons
- Length: 47.2 m (154 ft 10 in) o/a
- Beam: 8.9 m (29 ft 2 in)
- Draught: 4.7 m (15 ft 5 in)
- Installed power: 1,500 bhp (1,119 kW)
- Speed: 13 knots (24 km/h; 15 mph)

Shunkotsu Maru (Japanese: 俊鶻丸) was a Japanese deep sea trawler and survey/meteorological ship that was requisitioned by the Imperial Japanese Navy during World War II and served in varying roles as a patrol boat, transport ship, cargo ship, minesweeper, subchaser, and escort ship and as an oceanographic research ship after the war.

== History ==
Shunkotsu Maru was commissioned by the Japanese Ministry of Agriculture and Forestry (農林省) and laid down on 25 March 1928 at the shipyard of Yokohama Ship Co., Ltd. (横濱船渠株式會社). She was launched on 14 July 1928 and registered in Tokyo. She worked primarily as a fishery enforcement and inspection ship in the Sea of Okhotsk and the North Pacific. On 2 November 1941, she was requisitioned by the Imperial Japanese Navy and assigned to the Fifth Fleet and based in the Maizuru Naval District as part of the 13th Minesweeper Division under Captain Toshio Mitsuka (along with Kaihō Maru and Hakuhō Maru). The unit was part of the Kiska invasion force during the Aleutian Islands campaign. She survived the war. After the war, she served as a training ship for the Tokyo University of Marine Science and Technology. In 1952, she was returned to the Ministry of Agriculture, Forestry and Fisheries where she served as an oceanographic inspection boat. In May 1954, after the radioactive contamination of the crew of the Japanese fishing boat Daigo Fukuryū Maru, she was sent to the Bikini Atoll to measure radiation levels which showed that they were far higher than expected with all plankton and tuna within a 150 km (93 mi) radius significantly contaminated. She was replaced by the Ministry in 1958.
