= Alitia Bainivalu =

Fijian politician

Minister for Fisheries and Forestry
- Incumbent
- Assumed office 28 June 2024
- Preceded by: Kalaveti Ravu

Member of the Fijian Parliament for PA List
- Incumbent
- Assumed office 14 December 2022

Personal details
- Born: 1980 or 1981 (age 44–45)
- Party: People's Alliance

Alitia Vakatai Bavou Cirikiyasawa Bainivalu (born 1980 or 1981) is a Fijian politician and Cabinet Minister. She is a member of the People's Alliance.

== Biography ==
Bainivalu is from Nabalabalain Ra Province. She was educated at the University of the South Pacific, graduating with a bachelor of science. She worked as a civil servant for the Ministry of Fisheries for eight years, before studying at Tokyo University of Marine Science and Technology for a master's degree in marine science. After returning to Fiji in 2022 she worked for the office of the opposition in parliament. She was one of six opposition staff laid off by the Social Democratic Liberal Party in the leadup to the 2022 election.

She was selected as a PA candidate in the 2022 Fijian general election, and was elected to Parliament, winning 1649 votes.

In June 2024 she was appointed as Minister for Fisheries and Forestry following the resignation of Kalaveti Ravu.
