= Daigo Fukuryū Maru =

Japanese fishing boat

Coordinates: 35.6510°N 139.8263°E

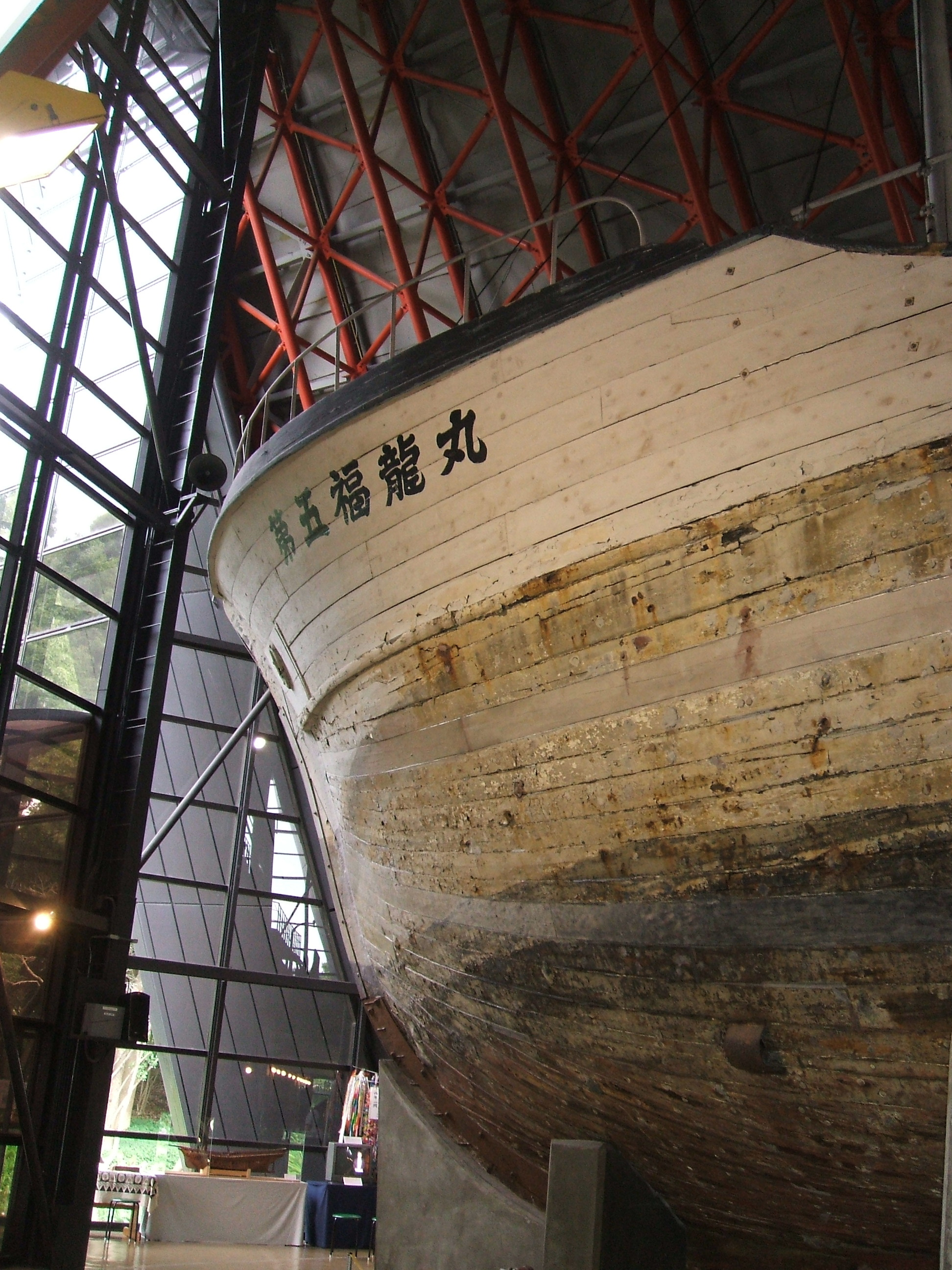
- Daigo Fukuryū Maru on display in Tokyo

History

Japan
- Name: Daigo Fukuryu Maru; ("Lucky Dragon No.5")
- Launched: 1947
- Status: Museum ship since 1976

General characteristics
- Type: Fishing boat
- Displacement: 140.86 t (139 long tons)
- Length: 28.56 m (93.7 ft)
- Beam: 5.9 m (19 ft)
- Propulsion: 250 hp (186 kW) engine
- Speed: 5 knots (9.3 km/h; 5.8 mph)
- Crew: 23

Daigo Fukuryū Maru (第五福龍丸; F/V Lucky Dragon 5) was a Japanese tuna fishing boat with a crew of 23 men which was contaminated by nuclear fallout from the United States Castle Bravo thermonuclear weapon test at Bikini Atoll on March 1, 1954.

The crew suffered acute radiation syndrome (ARS) for a number of weeks after the Bravo test in March. All recovered from the immediate effects of the American test detonation except for Kuboyama Aikichi, the boat's chief radioman, who died on September 23, 1954, from complications of radiation sickness. Kuboyama is considered the first victim of the hydrogen bomb and of the Castle Bravo test.

== Early days and final voyage ==
Built in March 1947 and launched from Koza, Wakayama, the boat was originally named Dainana Kotoshiro Maru (第七事代丸; Kotoshiro Maru No. 7). It was a bonito boat and moored in Misaki Fishing Harbor, Kanagawa Prefecture. It was later remodeled into a tuna fishing boat. In 1953, it moved to Yaizu Port, Shizuoka Prefecture, with a new name, Daigo Fukuryū Maru, translated as Lucky Dragon No. 5 or the Fifth Lucky Dragon.

The Lucky Dragon No. 5 took five ocean voyages, the last of which began on January 22, 1954, and ended on March 14 of that year. The crew set off to go fishing in the Midway Sea near Midway Atoll, but when they lost most of their trawl nets to the sea, they altered their course southward near the Marshall Islands and encountered fallout from the Castle Bravo nuclear test at Bikini Atoll on March 1.

A map of the varying location of the boat in the days leading up to and after the day of the explosion is available. On March 1, the map depicts the vessel very near to the border of the US Navy issued "danger zone notice" dated October 10, 1953. Following March 1, the vessel charted a practically straight geodesic course back to its home port of Yaizu, passing the same latitude as Wake Island between March 4 and 6 and arriving at Yaizu on March 14.

The source of the map does not state how the map was created, that is, it does not state that the ship's log was consulted in the creation of the map, nor does it provide the navigator's measurements with the compass and sextant of the period. The exact position of the ship on the day of the explosion is therefore uncertain. Contemporary references give a figure of "80 miles (130 km) east of Bikini Atoll" without stating the method by which the distance was computed. According to a 1997 paper by Martha Smith-Norris, the ship was operating "14 miles" outside the 57,000 square mile "Danger Area", and it was not detected by radar or visual spotter planes.

== Events surrounding March 1, 1954 ==
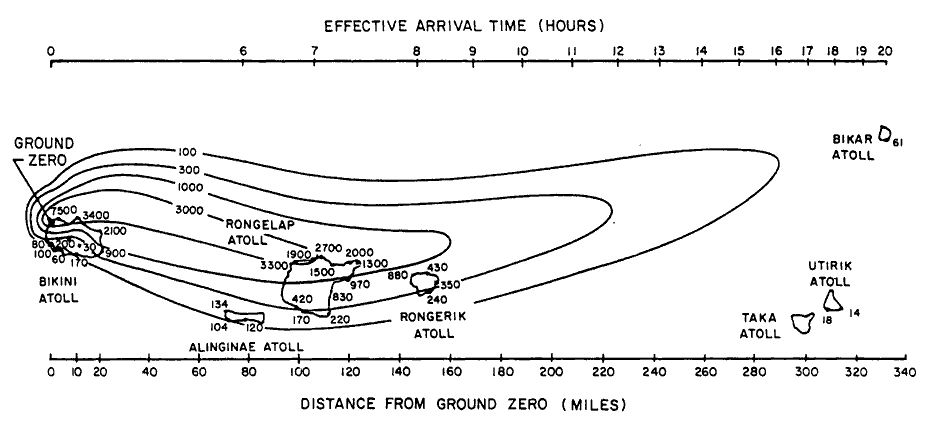
The Bravo fallout plume spread dangerous levels of radiation over an area over 100 miles (160 km) long, including inhabited islands. The contour lines show the cumulative radiation dose in roentgens (R) for the first 96 hours after the test.

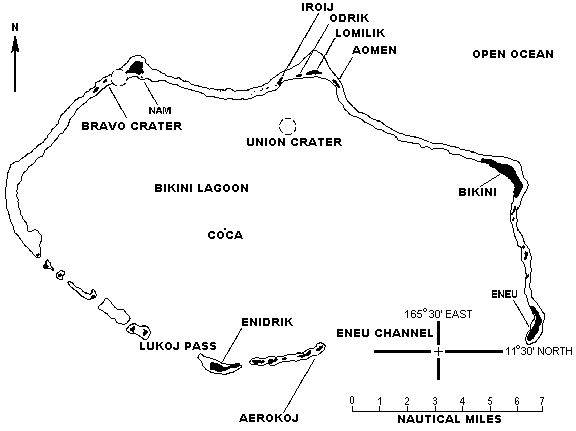
The Bikini Atoll. The Bravo crater is on the North West end of the atoll. The device's firing crew were located on Enyu island, variously spelt as Eneu island as depicted in this map.

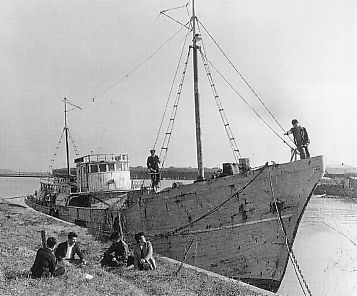
Daigo Fukuryū Maru in the early 1950s, shortly before the incident

The Daigo Fukuryū Maru (Lucky Dragon No. 5) encountered the fallout from the U.S. Castle Bravo nuclear test at Bikini Atoll, near the Marshall Islands, on March 1, 1954. When the test was held, the Daigo Fukuryū Maru was catching fish outside the danger zone that the U.S. government had declared in advance. However, the test was more than twice as powerful as predicted, and changes in weather patterns blew nuclear fallout, in the form of a fine ash, outside the danger zone. On that day, the sky in the west lit up like a sunset. The Daigo Fukuryū Maru was not damaged by the shock wave from the blast. However, several hours later white, radioactive dust made up of radioactive particles of coral and sand fell upon the ship. The fishermen attempted to escape from the area, but they took almost six hours to retrieve fishing gear from the sea and process fish (mainly shark and tuna) caught on the lines, exposing themselves to the radioactive fallout. The fishermen scooped the highly radioactive dust into bags with their bare hands. One fisherman, Oishi Matashichi, reported that he "took a lick" of the dust that fell on his ship, likening the falling material to 粉雪 ("powdered snow") and describing it as gritty but with no taste. The dust stuck to their bodies and the ship, entering their nasal passages and ears, irritating their eyes and collecting inside their underwear. Radiation sickness symptoms appeared later that day. Due to this, the fishermen called the white ash shi no hai (死の灰, death ash). The ash that fell upon the ship carried strontium-90, cesium-137, and uranium-237.

=== Events between March 2 and 14 ===
During their return, the crew began showing symptoms of radiation poisoning as early as the evening after exposure. They experienced pain, headaches, nausea, dizziness, and diarrhea. Their eyes began to turn red and developed an itchy mucus. One crewman decided to keep some of the ash in order to have it analysed on their arrival home, but it was kept in a pouch hung from one of the bunks and was therefore in close proximity to the sleeping men for the duration of their return. Later analysis of the sample by, among others, Tokyo University determined that the ash was caused by a hydrogen bomb. The announcement of this news came as a large surprise to the Americans as they had persistently kept their nuclear experimentation secret.

By the third day, the men began to develop small blisters on their bodies where they had been touched by the radioactive ash. Their faces also began to turn dark. A week into their return journey, their hair began to fall out. On March 11, the ship encountered rough seas causing them to dock late on March 14. This late arrival fortunately caused the contaminated fish to stay within the ship until the next morning. Thus, they were able to throw away much of the tuna once they discovered the radiation.

=== Events after return to Yaizu port ===
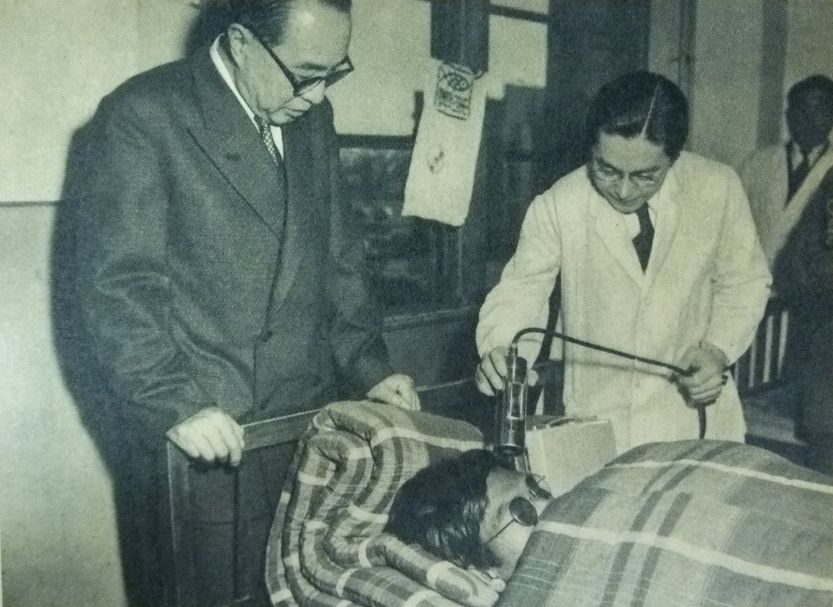
Medical professionals, before the era of whole body counting, assessing the radioactivity of a bedridden crew member by using a geiger counter on 31 March 1954, focusing on the person's hair, which would have collected dusty fallout.

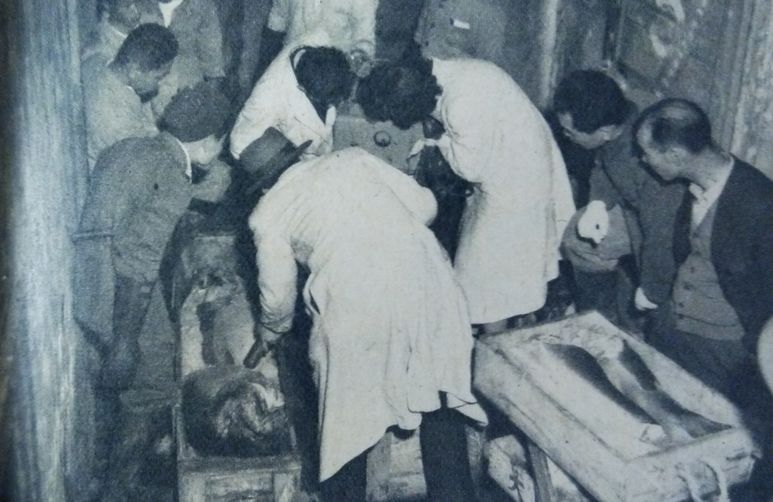
Inspection of tuna with a geiger counter before sale at a fishmonger's on 31 March 1954

After their arrival, the men went to the Yaizu Public Hospital, where the surgeon, Oi Toshiaki, applied a zinc ointment to their faces and sent them home. On March 15, 1954, engineer Yamamoto, deckhand Masuda, and 5 others who were said to make up the "elderly" crew members were sent to the Tokyo University Hospital for treatment. There, they tested Masuda's bone marrow and found his white blood cell count at half the normal level. Japanese biophysicist Nishiwaki Yasushi immediately traveled from Osaka to Yaizu to examine the crew and their boat. He quickly concluded that they had been exposed to radioactive fallout and wrote a letter to the chief of the US Atomic Energy Commission (AEC) asking for more information on how to treat the crew. The crew members, suffering from nausea, headaches, burns, pain in the eyes, bleeding from the gums, and other symptoms, were diagnosed with acute radiation syndrome. The US did not respond to Nishiwaki's letter or letters from other Japanese scientists requesting information and help. However, the United States did dispatch two medical scientists to Japan to study the effects of fallout on the ship's crew and to assist their doctors. The remaining crew members were quarantined in Yaizu North Hospital with all of their clothes and belongings buried on the property. High levels of radiation were found in the men's hair and nails, and so the hospital was forced to cut off the rest of their hair.

There is a hint of criticism from one of the crewmembers, Oishi Matashichi, aimed at the then Japanese Foreign Minister Katsuo Okazaki in his book, citing the fact that despite the lingering resentment towards the US over the atomic bombings of Hiroshima and Nagasaki in 1945, and the suspicion that US officials were only interested in research rather than attempting to cure anyone of their subsequent bombing-related ailments, Foreign Minister Okazaki is said to have spoken frequently to the crew about the need for the Americans to be present during treatment. Indeed, Oishi goes as far as to say "The Foreign Minister usually stood on the American side, and it appeared that he was the American Foreign Minister (rather than our own)."

The men were all transferred to the Tokyo University Hospital. There, they would remain for 14 months or more in some cases. They were subjected to daily examinations and multiple blood samples. Bone marrow was also drawn from different parts of their bodies. Their red and white blood cells had dropped significantly, causing internal bleeding and bloody stools. They had constant high fevers, bled from their noses and gums, and had persistent diarrhea. Their sperm counts also fell to low numbers or, in some cases, to none. For their treatment, the men were prescribed bed rest and given large quantities of antibiotics and blood transfusions. Dr. Morita Hisao reported that the men had developed acute panmyelosis, a disease that attacked their bone marrow, destroying its ability to generate blood.

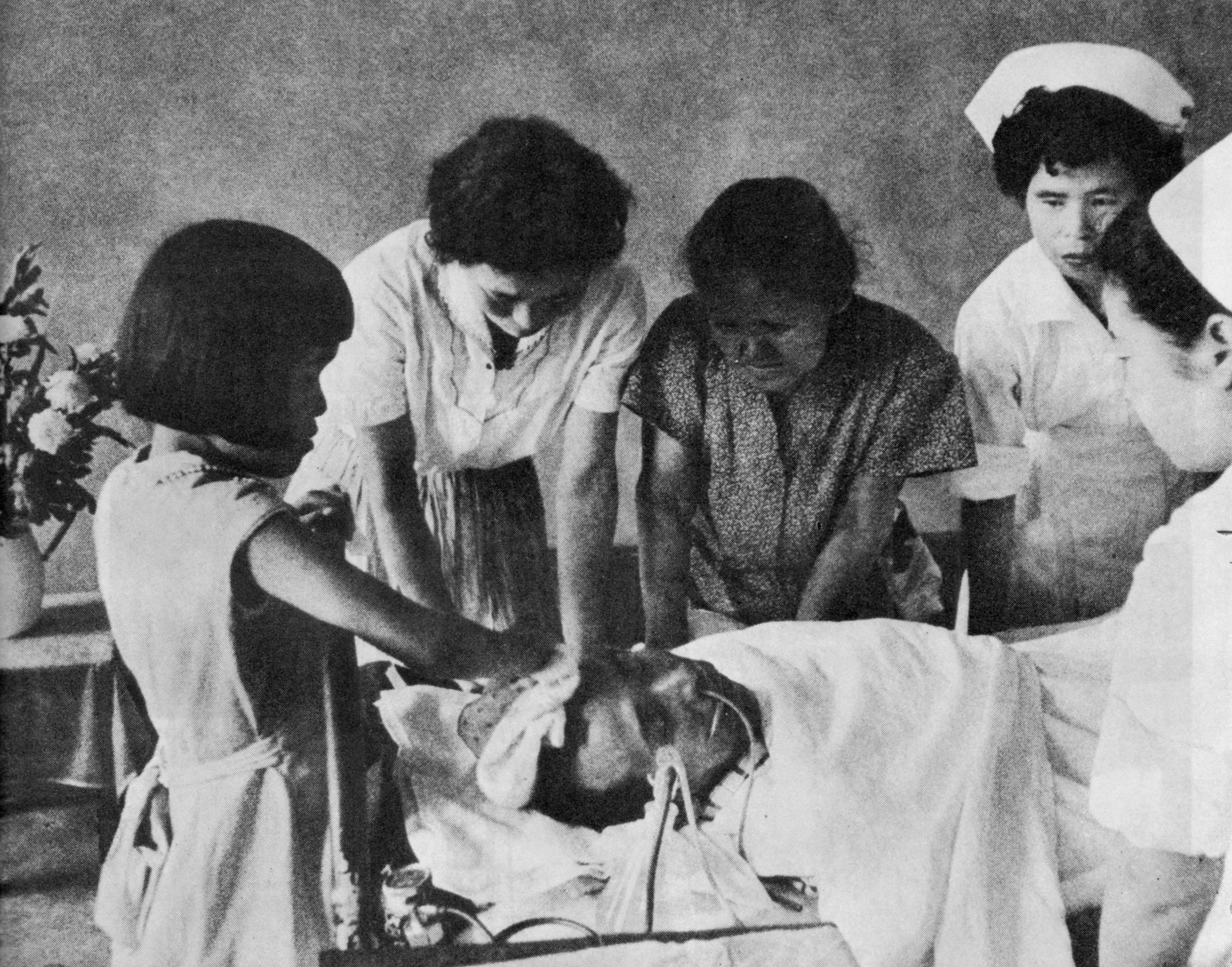
Kuboyama Aikichi on deathbed

Around August 20, Kuboyama Aikichi's condition deteriorated. By August 29, he fell into critical condition after developing meningitis. He became delirious and violent, having to be tied to a bed on the floor. Kuboyama soon fell into a coma and developed pneumonia. On September 23, he became the first member of the crew to die from complications of radiation sickness. The remaining 22 crew members were released from the hospital on May 20, 1955, after 14 months. They received yearly checkups to monitor the toll of long-term radiation sickness complications.

== Health history of the surviving crew ==
Like the hibakusha, survivors of atomic bombings in Hiroshima and Nagasaki in 1945, the Daigo Fukuryū Maru crew were stigmatized because of the Japanese public's fear of those exposed to radiation (it was commonly believed to be contagious). The crew tried to stay quiet about their exposure for decades, beginning with their discharge from the hospital. Some crew members moved away from their homes to make a fresh start. However, unlike the hibakusha, the Lucky Dragon No. 5 crew did not qualify for the medical care benefits that the survivors of the atomic bomb were given.

- After being released from the hospital, Oishi Matashichi left his hometown to open a dry cleaning business. Beginning in the 1980s, he frequently gave talks advocating nuclear disarmament. His first child was stillborn, which Oishi attributed to his exposure to radiation. In 1992, Oishi developed cirrhosis of the liver but recovered after successful surgery. In 2011, he published a book titled, The Day the Sun Rose in the West: Bikini, the Lucky Dragon and I in English. The book combines his personal story, the story of the Daigo Fukuryū Maru, and declassified documents regarding communications between the Japanese and American governments about the fallout's damage.
- Former crew member Susumu Misaki opened a tofu shop after the incident. He died of lung cancer in Shizuoka Prefecture at the age of 92.
- Another crew member, Masayoshi Kawashima (川島正義), tried to earn a living making pouches after his release from the hospital, but it failed. Issues in his personal life led to a divorce. Kawashima returned to fishing but died soon after aged 47.

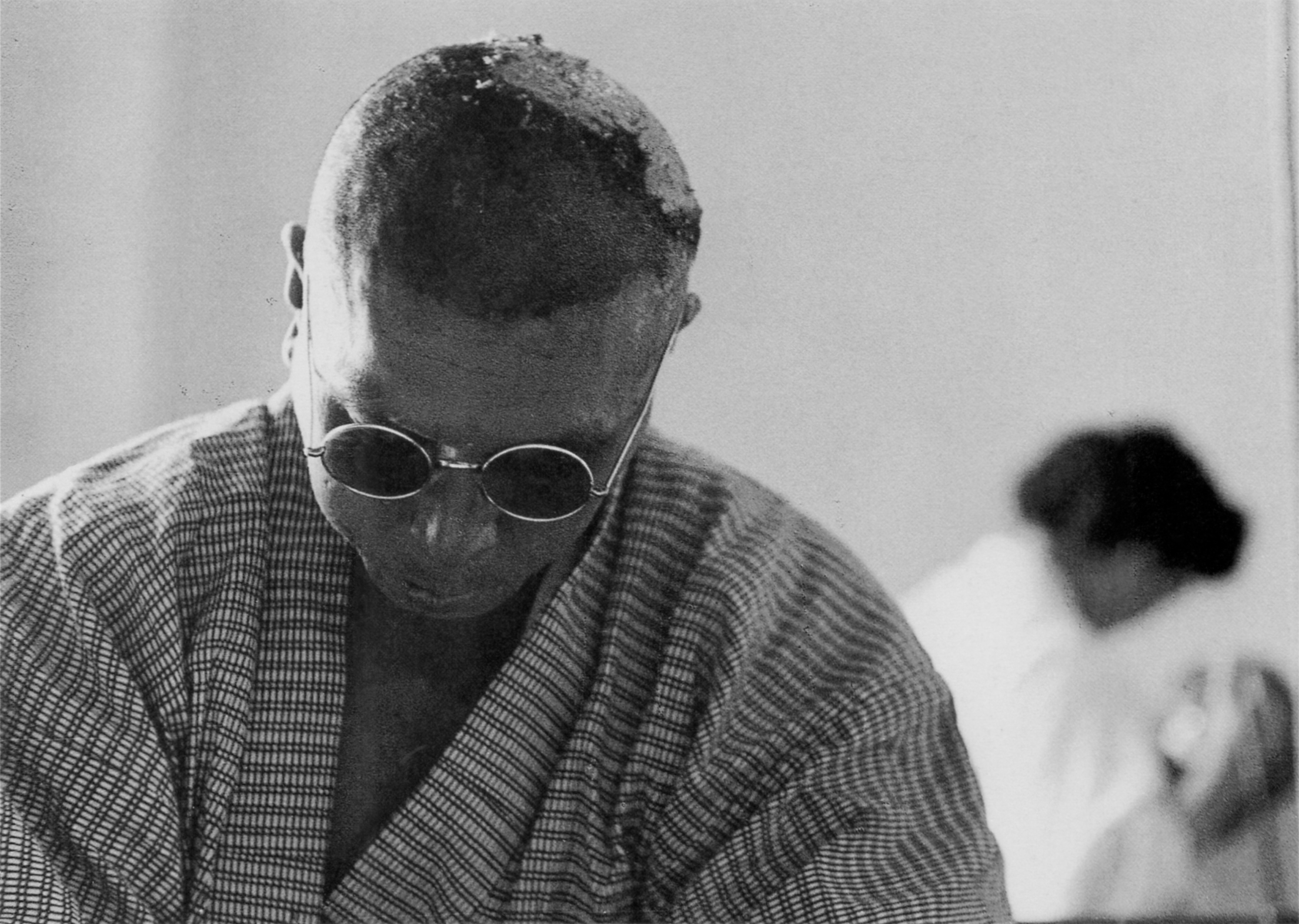
Sanjirō Masuda in sickroom, photographed by Masaharu Yoshimura (Mainichi Shinbun) in 1954

- Crew member Sanjirō Masuda (増田三次郎) died aged 54 after contracting various illnesses and diseases, including cirrhosis of the liver, sepsis, stomach ulcers and diabetes.
- Crew member Yūichi Masuda (増田祐一) collapsed suddenly while working in a field and died less than 10 days later. Again, cirrhosis of the liver was cited as a cause.
- Crew member Shinzō Suzuki (鈴木慎三) died on 18 June 1982, aged 57, on the Meishin Expressway (名神高速公路) after the truck he was driving was involved in a rear-end collision, and burned to death in the wreckage. When Oishi Matashichi contacted his widow (as the two had lost contact, Matashichi only found out about the accident four years after it had happened), she told him that her husband had suffered from general weakness. Cirrhosis of the liver was once again mentioned.
- Crew member Hiroshi Kozuka (小塚博) was diagnosed with stomach cancer in March 1986. He, like some of the other crew, had been regularly attending annual check-ups, which began in 1957 at the National Institute of Radiological Science (放射線医学総合研究所) in Chiba (千葉市). Despite having his regular check-up just a couple of weeks before, the cancer was diagnosed by a local doctor shortly after stomach pains began and didn't subside. He underwent surgery and had two-thirds of his stomach removed. Recovering well, he was diagnosed with pneumonia just 1 week later.
- In 1987, chief engineer Chūji Yamamoto (山本忠司) was admitted to a hospital in Gamagori (蒲郡) the day before he was due to undergo his latest annual check-up. He was diagnosed with liver, colon, and lung cancer. Oishi Matashichi visited Yamamoto in the hospital along with another crew member, Tsutsui (筒井), on 21 February 1987, only for Yamamoto to succumb to his cancer 13 days later on 6 March 1987, aged 60.
- Crew member Kaneshige Takagi (高木兼重) succumbed to liver cancer aged 66; the news filtered through from Hoto Island (保戸島, part of Kyūshū) to Oishi Matashichi in December 1989. During the phone call received from the wife of Takagi, she mentioned that an employee at the crematorium told her that the bones of Takagi after cremation were the most thin and fragile that they'd ever seen.

== Responsibility and remembrance ==
The US government refused to disclose the fallout's composition due to "national security", as the fallout's isotopic ratios — namely a percentage of uranium-237 — could reveal the design of the Castle Bravo device through radio-chemical analysis. For instance, Joseph Rotblat may have deduced the staging nature of the device by studying the ratio and presence of tell-tale isotopes present in the fallout. As of 1954, the Soviet Union had not yet been successful with thermonuclear staging and such information could have assisted in their development of a thermonuclear weapon. Lewis Strauss, the head of the AEC, issued several denials that claimed the United States were not to blame. He also hypothesized that the lesions on the fishermen's bodies were not caused by radiation but by the chemical action of the caustic burnt lime that is produced when coral is calcined, and that they were inside the danger zone. He told President Eisenhower's press secretary that the Daigo Fukuryū Maru may have been a "red spy outfit", commanded by a Soviet agent intentionally exposing the ship's crew and catch in order to embarrass the US and gain intelligence on the test's device.

Later, the United States expanded the danger zone and it was revealed that in addition to the Daigo Fukuryū Maru, many other fishing boats were in the expanded zone at the time. It is estimated that about one hundred fishing boats were contaminated to some degree by fallout from the test. Despite denials by Lewis Strauss concerning the extent of the claimed contamination of the fish caught by Daigo Fukuryu Maru and other ships, the FDA later imposed rigid restrictions on tuna imports.

At first, the US claimed that the extent of the Lucky Dragon incident contamination was trivial. Later, the United States paid Kuboyama's widow and children the equivalent in yen of about $2,800 ($26,700 in 2020). The tragedy of the Daigo Fukuryū Maru gave rise to a fierce anti-nuclear movement in Japan, rising especially from the fear that the contaminated fish had entered the market. The Japanese and U.S. governments negotiated a compensation settlement, with the transfer to Japan of a compensation of $15,300,000, of which the fishery received a compensation of $2 million, with the surviving crew receiving about ¥ 2 million each, ($5,550 in 1954, $52,800 in 2020). It was also agreed that the victims would not be given hibakusha status. The Japanese government pledged that it would not pursue further reparations from the U.S. government.

In 1965, Richard Hudson published a chronicle of the events illustrated by Ben Shahn and titled Kuboyama and the saga of the 'Lucky Dragon'. It reads like an anti-nuclear pamphlet.

In the 1990s, Oishi Matashichi worked to erect a memorial for the tuna impacted by the fallout. He gathered small donations and raised enough to erect a stone memorial called "The Tuna Epitaph" at the Tsukiji fish market. While the stone was being moved they erected a metal plaque within the market.

== Post-contamination ==
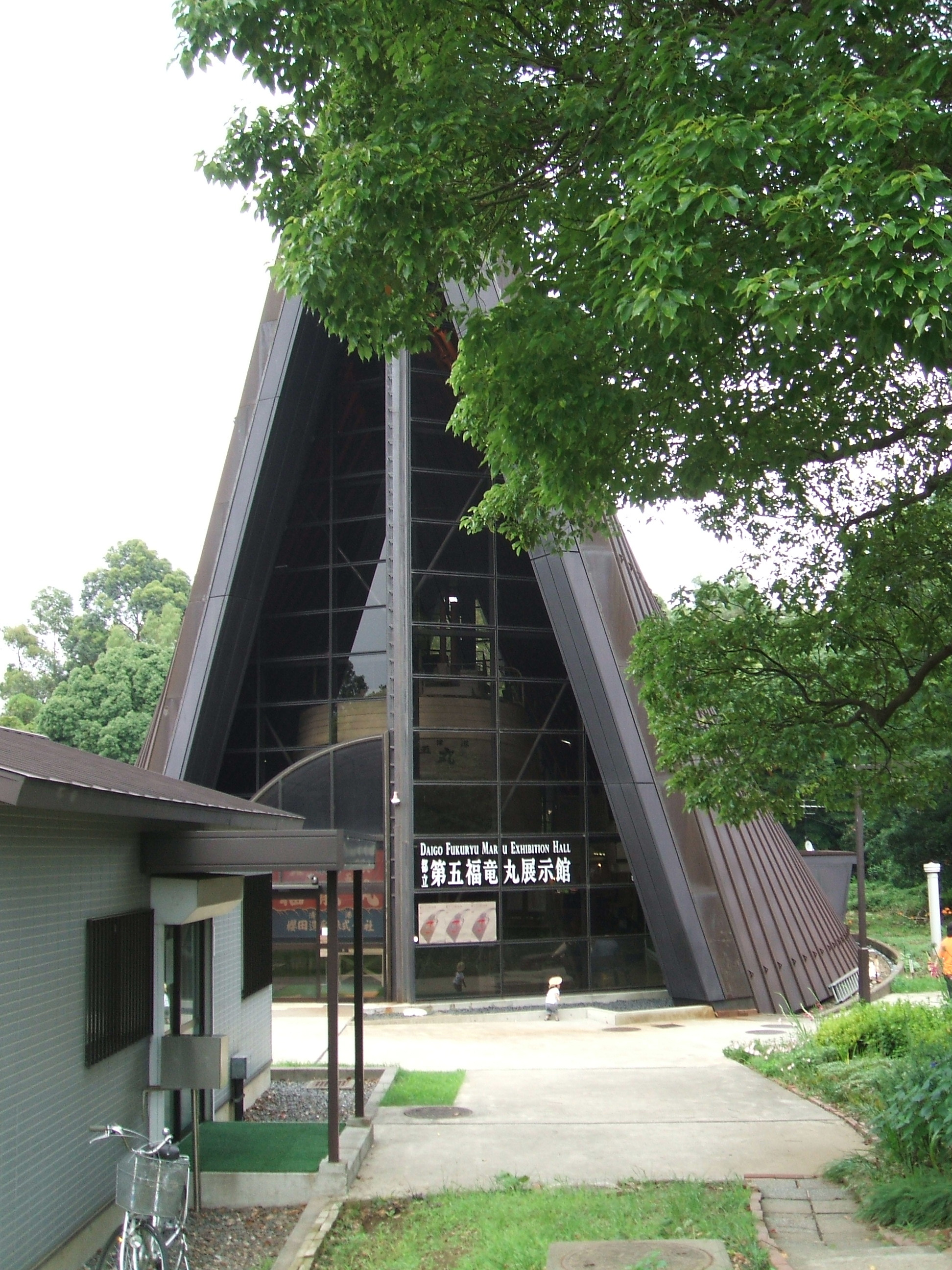
The ship in its museum in 2007

When it was first docked at the fish market in Yaizu, the ship gave off radiation that could be detected 100 feet from the ship. A Geiger counter detected 120 milliroentgens on the deck of the ship. These high numbers caused Dr. Shiokawa to order the ship moved to Yaizu's north pier and guarded by police. The various items aboard the ship, from cabbage leaves to dead cockroaches, were tested and showed high levels of radiation.

On March 22, the future of the ship became a debate between the U.S. military, the Japanese government and scientists. The United States military proposed moving the ship to their base at Yokosuka to be disposed of. Minister without portfolio Ando Masazumi argued that the ship should be kept for three months, parts saved for scientific research, and the rest of the ship scuttled. Professor Nakaizumi of Tokyo University argued that the Japanese government should purchase the ship for residual radiation research. On August 22, the ship was purchased by the Japanese government and towed to the Tokyo University of Fisheries. In 1956, the ship was refitted and renamed as Hayabusa Maru and put to use as a training vessel.

The public outcry against the government's handling of the Daigo Fukuryū Maru, its crew, and the lack of information about fallout kindled an anti-nuclear and anti-American movement. After the ship docked and received national attention, municipal, prefecture and national assemblies passed resolutions in support of limiting or banning nuclear testing. After the death of Kuboyama, the movement expanded. In Tokyo, the National Council for a Petition Movement to Ban Atomic and Hydrogen bombs was founded. This group began an annual ban-the-bomb convention in 1955. At the first World Conference, a new organization called the Japan Council Against Atomic and Hydrogen Bombs formed to expand the movement and moved to include the hibakusha. The anti-nuclear movement eventually culminated in demonstrations against the United States-Japan Security Treaty in 1960.

On June 11, 1970, the Daigo Fukuryū Maru received media attention as it still sat in garbage within the canal. The area was cleaned up and made into a park. The ship was pulled from the water and put on public display as a symbol of opposition to nuclear weapons in an exhibit hall in Tokyo.

The Daigo Fukuryū Maru was deemed safe for public viewing and was preserved in 1976. It is now on display in Tokyo at the Tokyo Metropolitan Daigo Fukuryū Maru Exhibition Hall.

== Media ==
- The 1954 Toho film Godzilla was inspired in part by this event. The ship itself appears on a poster in the 2001 film Godzilla, Mothra and King Ghidorah: Giant Monsters All-Out Attack, which also features Godzilla coming ashore and wreaking havoc in the Yaizu area.
- The book and anime Tobiuo no Boya wa Byoki desu was based on this event.
- A poem, Japon Balıkçısı (The Japanese Fishermen), was written in 1956 by Turkish poet Nâzım Hikmet Ran about the events.
- A short novel, Ash of Bikini by Lev Petrov and Arkady Strugatsky, closely following the incident, was published in 1956 in Russian. Part of it was republished in a tutorial for schoolchildren nine years later.
- Ralph Lapp wrote The Voyage of the Lucky Dragon, which was published in 1958. It was reviewed on the front page of The New York Times Book Review.
- A film version of the events, Daigo Fukuryū Maru (1959), was directed and screenwritten by Kaneto Shindo, and produced by Kindai Eiga Kyokai and Shin Seiki Eiga.
- The 1955 radio play Die japanischen Fischer by the West German Wolfgang Weyrauch was inspired by these events.
- Artist Tarō Okamoto created the painting Moeru hito (Burning People) in response to the Lucky Dragon No. 5. The painting was displayed in the Fifth World Conference Against Atomic and Hydrogen Bombs in 1959. He also included the ship in his mural Myth of Tomorrow in Shibuya railway station.
- West German composer Herbert Eimert composed Epitaph für Aikichi Kuboyama (für Sprecher und Sprachklänge) from 1957 to 1962 at the Studio for Electronic Music (WDR), in which the grave inscription of the fisherman is first narrated by Richard Münch and then repeated and manipulated in an electroacoustic manner.

== See also ==
- History of nuclear weapons
- Katsuko Saruhashi – studied the transport of fallout in the ocean, and thus determined the ocean's circulation patterns, after the 1954 Castle Bravo explosion
- USS Patapsco, US Navy tanker also contaminated by fallout from Castle Bravo while at sea
- Project 4.1 — study of other victims of Bravo contamination
- Anti-nuclear movement
- History of the anti-nuclear movement
- The Plutonium Files
- Japanese oceanographic research ship Shunkotsu Maru – sent in 1954 to measure radiation levels in the atmosphere and water near Bikini Atoll

=== Nuclear incidents involving Japan ===
- Atomic bombings of Hiroshima and Nagasaki (1945)
- Tokaimura nuclear accident (1997, 1999)
- Fukushima Daiichi nuclear disaster (Okuma, 2011)
