= Marine Day =

Japanese national holiday

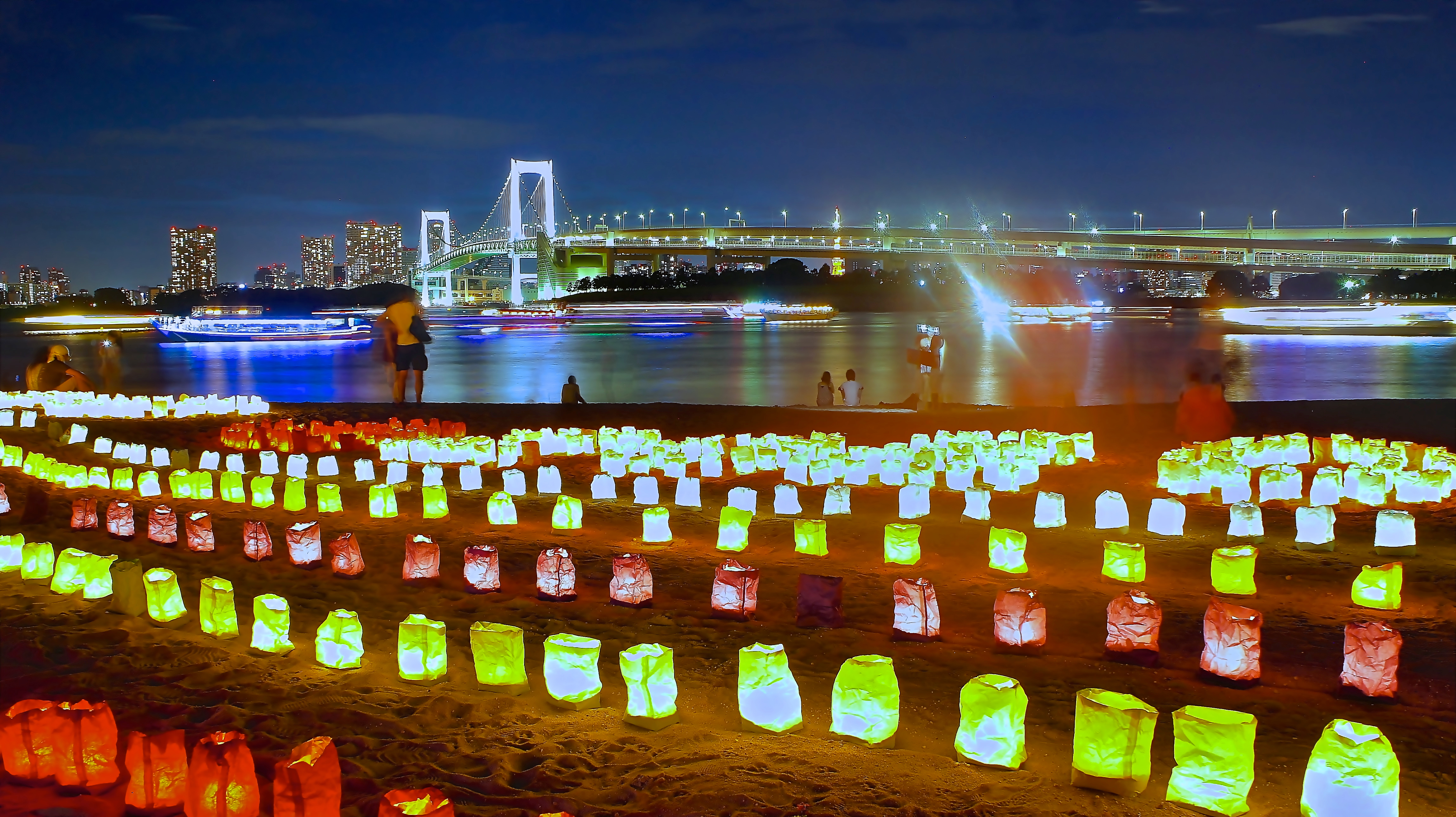
- Official name: 海の日 (Umi no Hi)
- Observed by: Japan
- Type: Public
- Significance: Honors the blessings of the oceans and economic prosperity of maritime Japan
- Celebrations: Families may visit beaches, swim, snorkel, surf, or dive. National aquariums host special water-related events.
- Date: Third Monday in July
- 2025 date: July 21
- 2026 date: July 20
- 2027 date: July 19
- 2028 date: July 17
- Frequency: annual

Marine Day (Japanese: 海の日, Hepburn: Umi no Hi), also known as "Ocean Day" or "Sea Day", is a public holiday in Japan usually celebrated on the third Monday in July. The holiday is to give thanks to the ocean for its bounty and to consider the importance of it to Japan as a maritime nation.

Many people take advantage of the holiday and summer weather to take a beach trip. Other ocean-related festivities are observed as well. The date roughly coincides with the end of the rainy season (梅雨 tsuyu) in much of the Japanese mainland.

In 2020, the holiday was observed on Thursday, July 23, a one-time move that was made as a special accommodation to support the opening of the Tokyo Olympics. Due to the postponement of the Olympics, the 2021 date was moved to July 22, also on Thursday as a one-time move.

== History ==
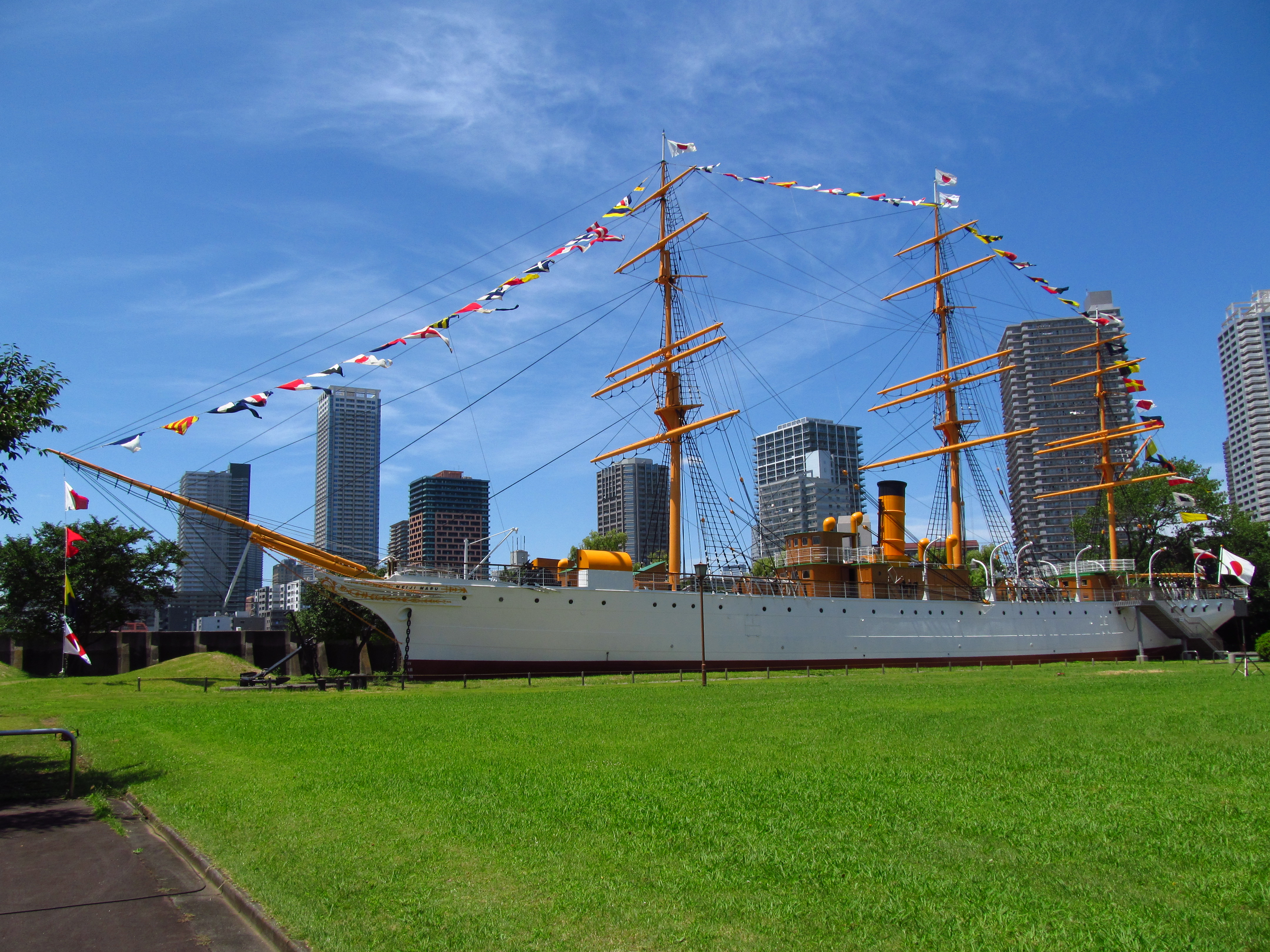
Meiji Maru is the origin of Marine Day

The day was known as Marine Memorial Day (海の記念日, umi no kinen bi) until 1996. Communications Minister Shōzō Murata designated the day in 1941 to commemorate the Meiji Emperor and his 1876 voyage in the Meiji Maru, an iron steamship constructed in Scotland in 1874. The voyage included a trip around the Tōhoku region, embarking on a lighthouse boat in Aomori, and a brief stop in Hakodate before returning to Yokohama on July 20 of that year. However, it was not designated a national holiday until 1995, when it became the first holiday in the summer months.

First observed on July 20, 1996, the Happy Monday System legislation moved the date to the third Monday of July beginning in 2003.

As special arrangement for the 2020 Summer Olympics, the 2020 date for Marine Day was moved to July 23. With the Olympics and Paralympics postponed until 2021 due to the COVID-19 pandemic, the government left this change in place for 2020 and passed an amendment to the Olympic and Paralympic Special Measures Act to make a corresponding change to the holiday in 2021.

== Celebration ==
On this day, families may visit beaches such as Isshiki Beach in Hayama and swim, snorkel, surf, or dive. People may also participate in an event called 'mud-ball throwing'. National aquariums also host special water-related events on this day.
