= Oishi Matashichi =

Japanese writer (1934–2021)

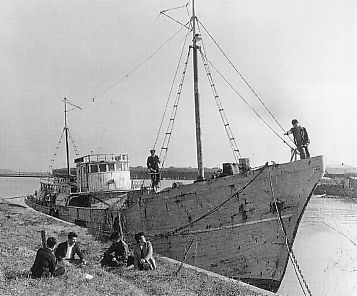
- Daigo Fukuryū Maru (Lucky Dragon 5)
- Born: January 1934
- Died: March 7, 2021 (aged 87)
- Occupations: fisherman, laundryman, speaker
- Notable work: The Day the Sun Rose in the West: Bikini, the Lucky Dragon, and I

Ōishi Matashichi (大石又七) (January 1934 – 7 March 2021) was a Japanese anti-nuclear activist and author, and was a fisherman exposed to the radioactive fallout of the Bravo Nuclear Test in the Marshall Islands on March 1, 1954. He was one of twenty-three fisherman on the vessel Daigo Fukuryū Maru. Their catch of tuna and shark was also found to be contaminated with radiation, resulting in two tons of tuna buried at Tsukiji fish market instead of being sold. Members of the crew suffered from acute radiation syndrome, with Kuboyama Aikichi dying of a related infection six months later. Ōishi was hospitalized for several months. He quit the fishing industry and moved to Tokyo to open a laundromat, which he ran for fifty years. His first child was stillborn and he later developed liver cancer.

He later became an author and an advocate for nuclear disarmament. In the 1990s, he started campaigning for nuclear disarmament. He advocated for the installation of a commemorative plaque at Tsukiji fish market in honor of the "irradiated tuna," which was added in 1999. In 2010 he attended an international conference in New York on ceasing the proliferation of nuclear weapons. In 2015 he attended a memorial service on the Marshall Islands for the victims of the nuclear testing at Bikini Atoll. He was also opposed to the usage of nuclear power plants, and attended a protest after the 2011 Fukushima Daiichi nuclear disaster.

== Early life and exposure to radioactive fallout ==
Oishi grew up during a turbulent era in Japan's history, living through World War II and the post-war American occupation of Japan. His father died shortly after the war, and Oishi had to quit school and find work at 14 to help support his family. He initially found work as a bonito fisherman but later signed on to work on the Daigo Fukuryū Maru or Lucky Dragon 5, a tuna fishing vessel. During his first voyage on the Lucky Dragon, Oishi witnessed the Castle Bravo nuclear test on March 1, 1954, he remembered seeing a bright light in the west. The sun was covered by a mushroom cloud and white, radioactive ash began to fall on board the ship. When the tuna fishermen returned home, they exhibited symptoms of what would later be called acute radiation syndrome. Geiger counters showed that the Lucky Dragon was now highly radioactive. Oishi was flown on a government plane to Tokyo where he stayed in a hospital along with the other fishermen. About six months into his stay at the hospital, Oishi's fellow crew member and victim of radioactive fallout Aikichi Kuboyama died from secondary infection after acute radiation exposure. The United States agreed to pay the Japanese government 2 million dollars ex gratia or "out of the goodness of their heart" to settle the incident but refused to accept any culpability.

== Activism ==
Public sentiment against nuclear testing grew in Japan after the Castle Bravo Test and the exposure of the crew of the Lucky Dragon 5. Oishi and the other survivors were released from the hospital in 1955. Many of them continued to be ill, but the government acknowledged no connection between their illness and their exposure to radioactive fallout. According to Nic Maclellan, Oishi participated in some of the early protests against nuclear testing in 1955, but Oishi's autobiography does not mention this early activism. Oishi moved to Tokyo and found work as a laundryman, hoping to find more anonymity in the big city and avoid the stigma and discrimination faced by many hibakusha or "bomb effected people." In 1992, Oishi found out that he had hepatitis C, a badly swollen spleen, and liver cancer. While the government did not acknowledge any connection between his health problems and radiation exposure, Oishi suspected the bomb had caused his illness. His first child was born stillborn and deformed. Oishi believed that his exposure to radiation caused this tragedy as well. In the mid-1990s, Oishi began to speak publicly at schools and other events about his experiences. He constructed models of the Lucky Dragon 5 as a way to help communicate his story.

== Battle for seamen's insurance ==
In 1995, Oishi began to realize that many of his former shipmates also suffered from hepatitis C. They most likely contracted the disease from blood transfusions they received at the government hospital where they were observed after their exposure in 1954. Oishi led many of the crew in a series of lawsuits to force their seamen's insurance to cover the effects of hepatitis C. In January, 1999, the governor of Shizuoka determined that seamen's insurance did not need to cover the deleterious effects of the infection. Oishi pressed the matter, and he and other survivors eventually received a hearing from the Ministry of Health. On August 4, 2000, the Ministry ruled that seamen's insurance should cover hepatitis C and that those Lucky Dragon crew members who succumbed to the disease would have "related to exposure" listed on their death certificate—an important admission from the government that the Bravo Test contributed to their demise.

== Bibliography ==
- 大石又七著、工藤敏樹編『死の灰を背負って : 私の人生を変えた第五福竜丸』, lit. Bearing the Ashes of Death: The Lucky Dragon No. 5 That Changed My Life (1991, Shinchosha)
- 大石又七お話、川崎昭一郎監修『第五福竜丸とともに : 被爆者から21世紀の君たちへ, lit. With The Lucky Dragon No. 5 : From A-bomb survivors to you in the 21st century (2001)
- 『ビキニ事件の真実 : いのちの岐路で, lit. The Truth of the Bikini Case: At the Crossroads of Life (2003, Misuzu Shobo)
- 『これだけは伝えておきたいビキニ事件の表と裏 : 第五福竜丸・乗組員が語る』, lit. I just want to tell you about the front and back of the bikini case: The Lucky Dragon No. 5 and Crew Talk (2007, Kamogawa)
- 『矛盾 : ビキニ事件、平和運動の原点』武蔵野書房, lit Contradiction: Bikini case, the origin of the peace movement (2011)
- The Day the Sun Rose in the West (2011, translated by Richard H. Minear, University of Hawaii Press)
