= Japanese escort ship Hakuhō Maru =

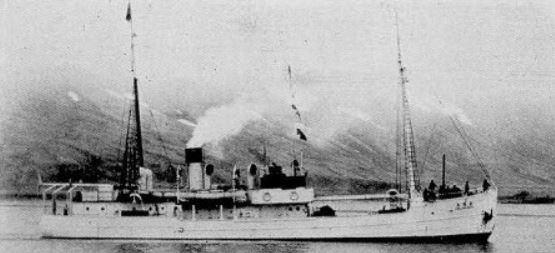
- Fishing inspection ship Hakuhō Maru

History

Empire of Japan
- Name: Hakuhō Maru
- Builder: Mitsubishi Shipbuilding Co., Ltd.
- Laid down: October 15, 1921
- Launched: 29 March 1922
- Sponsored by: Japanese Ministry of Agriculture and Forestry (農林省)
- Completed: February 16, 1922
- Acquired: requisitioned by Imperial Japanese Navy, 2 November 1941
- Identification: 28868
- Fate: Sunk by aircraft, 14 July 1945
- Notes: Call sign: JCXA

General characteristics
- Class & type: Naval trawler
- Tonnage: 332 gross register tons
- Length: 39.6 m (129 ft 11 in) o/a
- Beam: 7.5 m (24 ft 7 in)
- Draught: 4.1 m (13 ft 5 in)
- Installed power: 480 bhp (358 kW)

Hakuhō Maru (Japanese: 白鳳丸) was a Japanese deep sea trawler and survey/inspection ship that was requisitioned by the Imperial Japanese Navy during World War II and served in varying roles as a patrol boat, transport ship, cargo ship, minesweeper, and escort ship.

== History ==
Hakuhō Maru was commissioned by the Japanese Ministry of Agriculture and Forestry (農林省). She was laid down on October 15, 1921 at the Hikoshima Shipyard of Mitsubishi Shipbuilding Co., Ltd. (三菱造船株式會社彦島造), completed on February 16, 1922 and launched on 29 March 1922. She worked primarily as a fishery enforcement, inspection, and survey ship in the Sea of Okhotsk, the Kurile Islands, the Bering Sea, and the North Pacific. On 2 November 1941, she was requisitioned by the Imperial Japanese Navy and assigned to the Fifth Fleet (Northern Area Force) as part of the 13th Minesweeper Division under Captain Toshio Mitsuka (along with Kaihō Maru and Shunkotsu Maru). The unit was part of the Kiska invasion force under Captain Takeji Ono during the Aleutian Islands campaign. On 14 July 1945, while sailing on patrol from Kushiro to Hakodate, she was engaged by ten aircraft and received 6 direct hits. Heavily damaged, she was grounded and abandoned.
