= Meiji Maru =

Japanese sailing ship built in 1873

Coordinates: 35.6674°N 139.7903°E

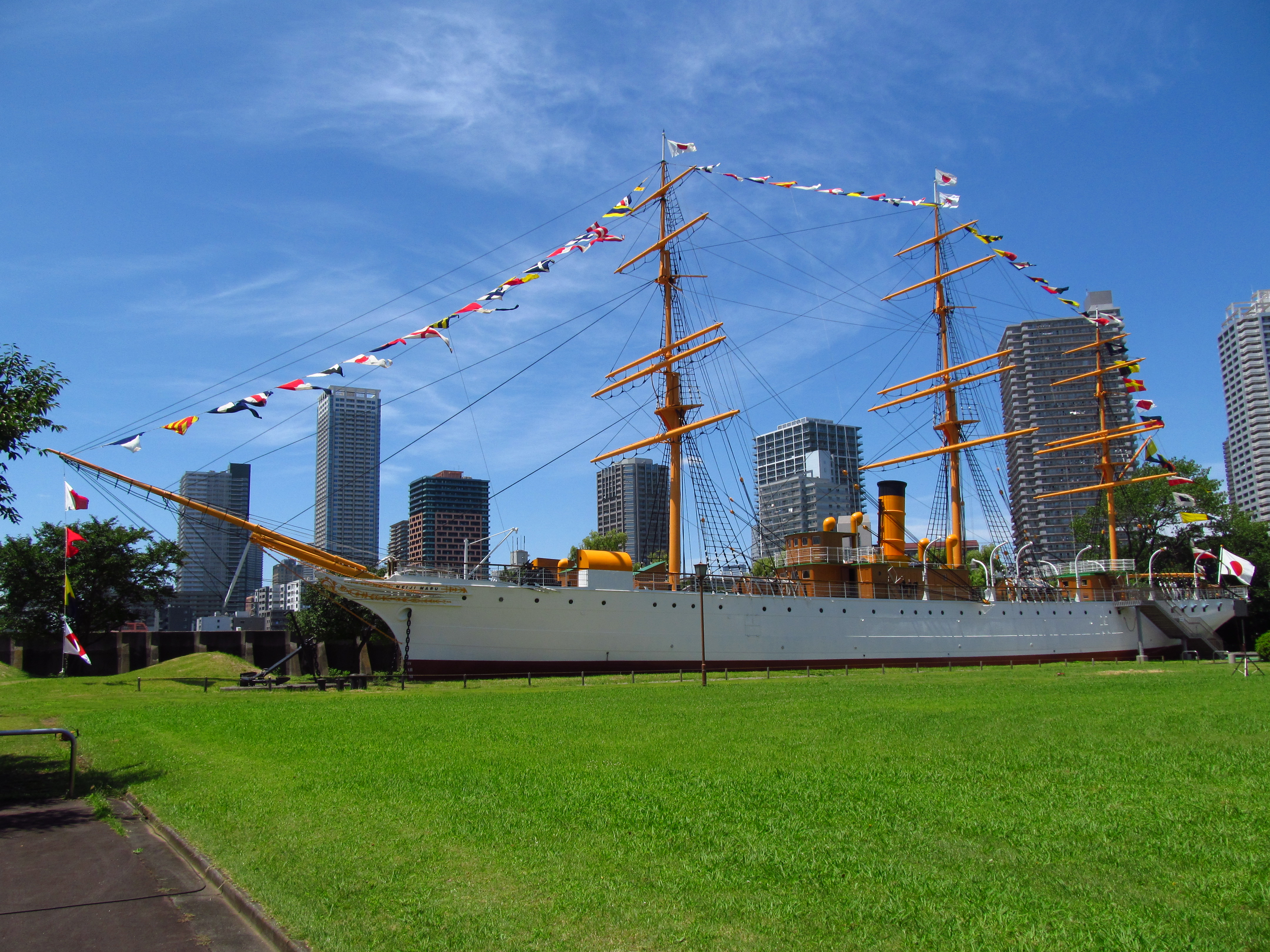
- Meiji Maru at the Tokyo University of Marine Science and Technology, Tokyo

History

Japan
- Namesake: Emperor Meiji
- Owner: Japanese Government; Tokyo Nautical School; Tokyo University of Marine Science and Technology
- Builder: Robert Napier and Sons
- Yard number: 338
- Completed: 1873
- Status: Museum ship

General characteristics
- Type: Lighthouse tender
- Displacement: 1027 grt
- Length: 240.3 feet (73.2 m)
- Beam: 29.4 feet (9.0 m)
- Propulsion: Twin screw

Meiji Maru (明治丸) is a Japanese sailing ship that serves as a museum ship in Tokyo. It is displayed at the Etchujima Campus of the Tokyo University of Marine Science and Technology.

== Construction ==
The ship was constructed for the Japanese government in Govan (now part of Glasgow, Scotland) in 1873 by Robert Napier and Sons. She was built as a two-masted lighthouse tender.

== Lighthouse ship ==
The Meiji Maru was used for the Japanese government's lighthouse service.

== Imperial voyages ==
Emperor Meiji sailed on the ship in 1876, from Aomori to Hakodate, and Hakodate to Yokohama. The ship contains a decorated cabin for the sole use of the emperor. In Japan the third Monday in July is Marine Day, which originally commemorated the emperor's arrival in Yokohama at the end of his journey on the ship on July 20th.

== Tokyo Nautical School ==
In 1897 it was transferred to the Tokyo Nautical School for use as a moored training ship. The Tokyo Nautical School later became part of the Tokyo University of Marine Science and Technology.

== Refitting ==
In 1898 she was re-rigged as a full-rigged ship by the Shomei Shipbuilding Company in Shinagawa.

== Museum ship ==
In 1964 it was moved to the Tokyo University of Mercantile Marine to be preserved as a memorial. An eight-year restoration was completed in 1988.
