= Tokyo University of Marine Science and Technology =

University in Japan

Coordinates: 35°37′36″N 139°44′49″E

- 東京海洋大学
- Type: National
- Established: 2003 (1875)
- President: Toshio Iseki
- Academic staff: 255 full-time
- Students: 2,762
- Undergraduates: 2,077
- Postgraduates: 685
- Doctoral students: 183
- Location: Minato, Tokyo, Japan
- Campus: Urban
- Website: www.kaiyodai.ac.jp/en/

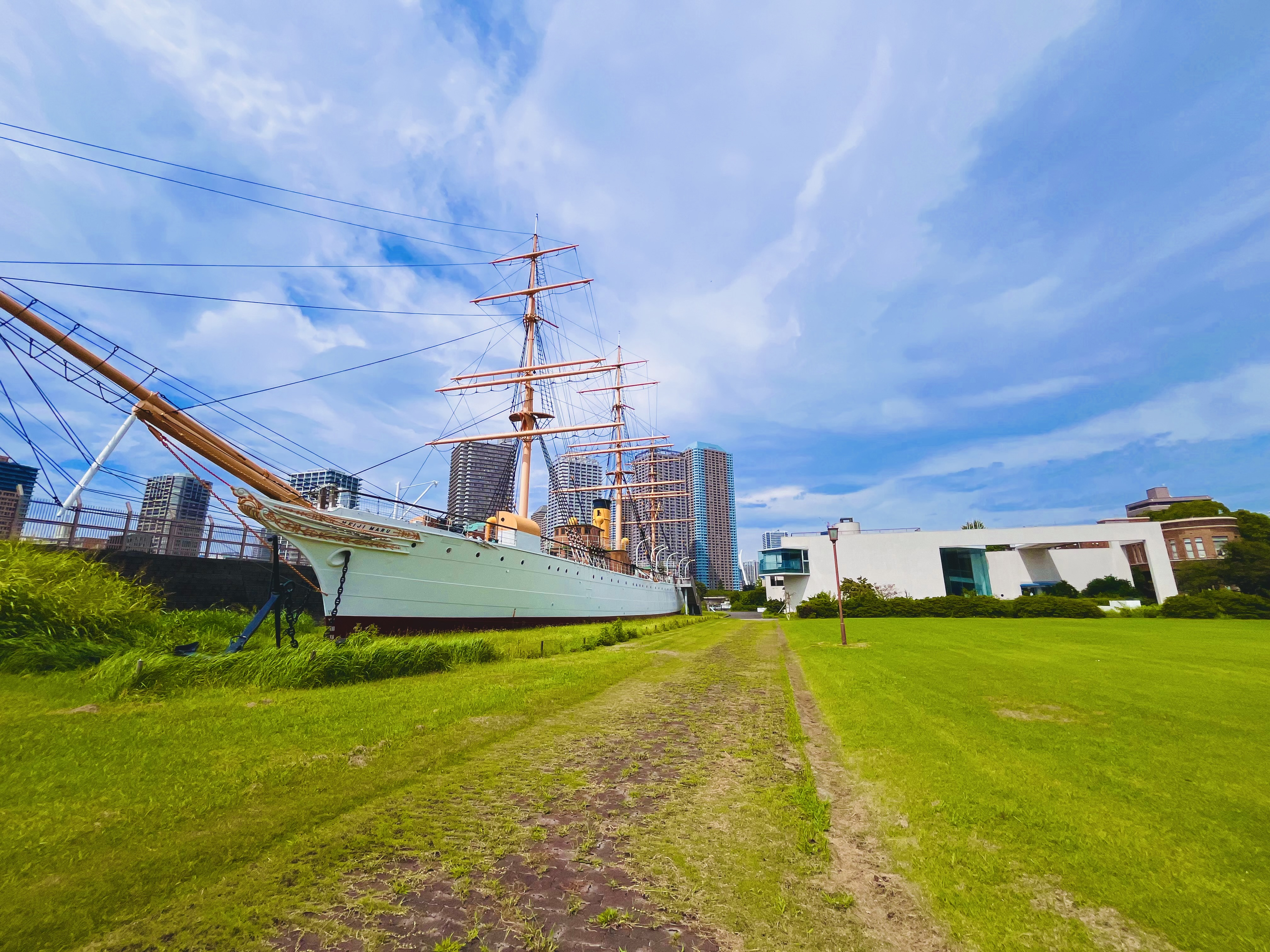
Etchujima campus

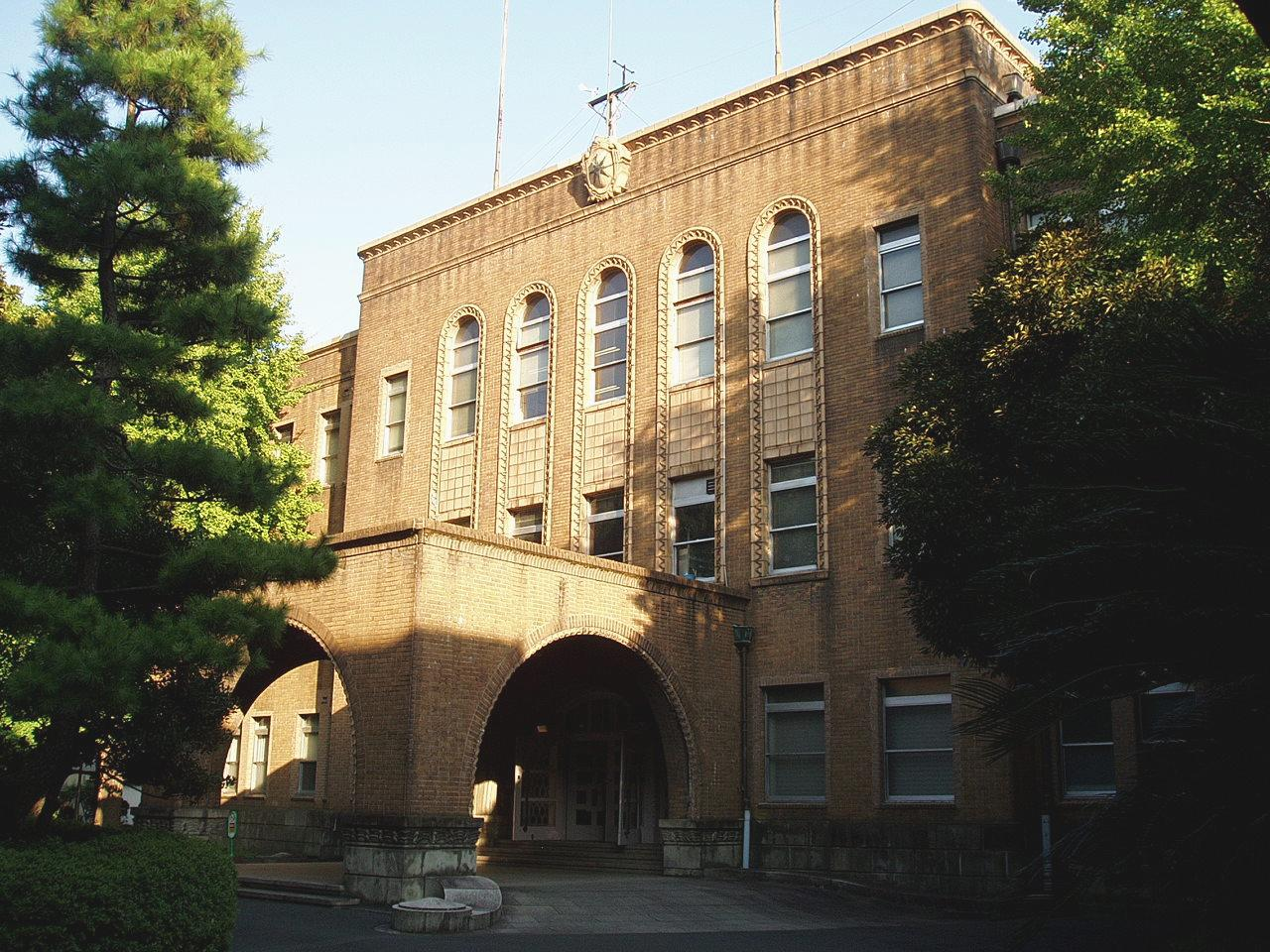
Etchujima Campus, the former campus of Tokyo University of Mercantile Marine

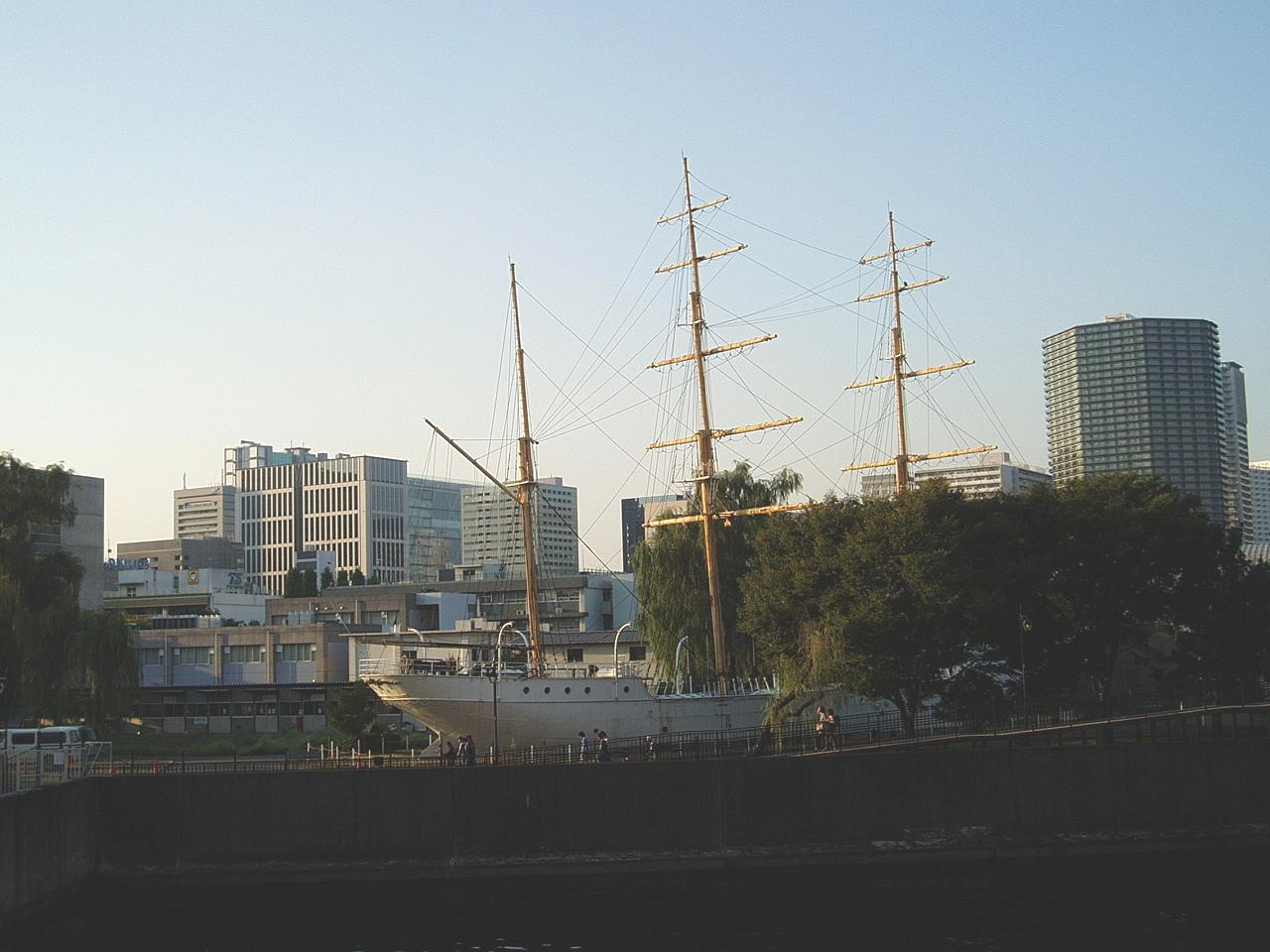
The former school ship Un'yō-maru, used by the Imperial Fisheries Institute from 1909 to 1929.

Tokyo University of Marine Science and Technology (東京海洋大学, Tōkyō Kaiyō Daigaku), abbreviated as Kaiyodai (海洋大, Kaiyōdai), is a national university in Japan. The main campus (Shinagawa Campus) is located in Minato, Tokyo and another campus (Etchujima Campus) is in Kōtō, Tokyo.

== History ==
The university was established in 2003 with a merger of two national universities, namely, Tokyo University of Mercantile Marine (東京商船大学, Tōkyō Shōsen Daigaku) in Koto, Tokyo and Tokyo University of Fisheries (東京水産大学, Tōkyō Suisan Daigaku) in Minato, Tokyo.

=== Tokyo University of Mercantile Marine ===
Tokyo University of Mercantile Marine was founded in November 1875 by Iwasaki Yatarō as Mitsubishi Nautical School (三菱商船学校, Mitsubishi shōsen gakkō). In 1882 it became a national school named Tokyo Nautical School (東京商船学校, Tōkyō shōsen gakkō). In 1902 the school was removed from Reiganjima to present-day Etchujima Campus. In 1925 the school became Tokyo Nautical College (東京高等商船学校, Tōkyō kōtō shōsen gakkō).

In April 1945, during World War II, three nautical colleges at Tokyo, Kobe and Shimizu were merged into one college simply named Nautical College, which was located in Shimizu. In 1949 the college was developed into the University of Mercantile Marine under Japan's new educational system. In 1957 the university moved to Tokyo again and was renamed Tokyo University of Mercantile Marine.

=== Tokyo University of Fisheries ===
Tokyo University of Fisheries was founded in November 1888 as Fishery Training Institute (水産伝習所, Suisan Denshūjo) by Japan Fisheries Association (大日本水産会, Dai-Nippon Suisan Kai). It became a national school in 1897 and was renamed Imperial Fisheries Institute (水産講習所, Suisan Kōshūjo). The institute had been located in Etchujima next to Tokyo Nautical College till 1945, when the school buildings were occupied by US Army. The institute moved to Yokosuka in 1947 and was renamed the First Imperial Fisheries Institute, since the second fisheries institute was founded in Shimonoseki, Yamaguchi (the former colonial Pusan Fisheries College, now the National Fisheries University).

In 1949 the institute was developed into Tokyo University of Fisheries under Japan's new educational system. In 1957 the university moved to present-day Shinagawa Campus in Minato, Tokyo.

== Undergraduate schools ==
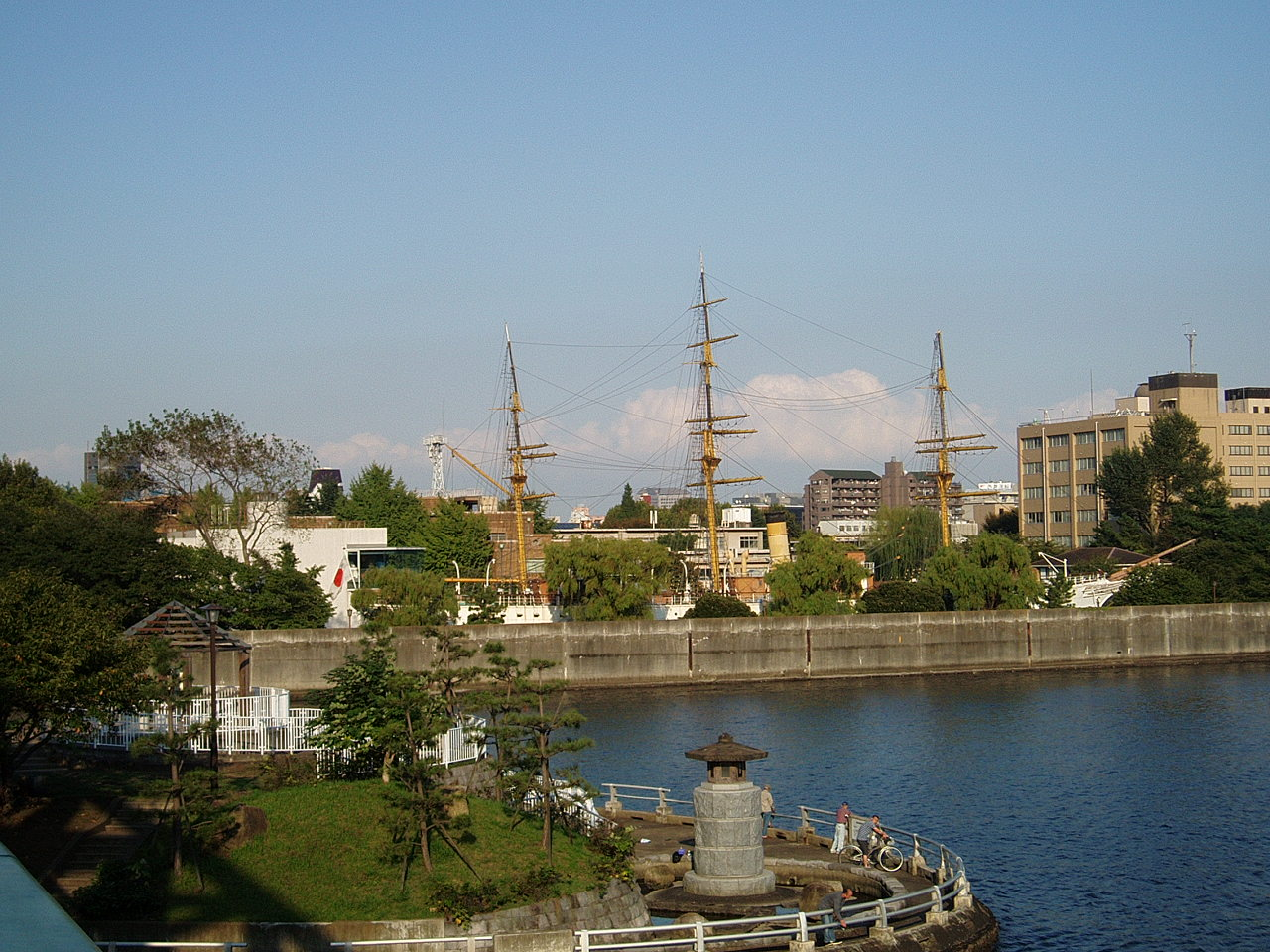
Etchujima Campus viewed from Aioi Bridge over Sumida River. The ship (Meiji Maru) was used by the school from 1897 to 1945.

- Faculty of Marine Science (in Shinagawa Campus)
  - Department of Ocean Sciences
  - Department of Marine Biosciences
  - Department of Food Science and Technology
  - Department of Marine Policy and Culture
  - Teacher Training Course for Fisheries High School Education
- Faculty of Marine Technology (in Etchujima Campus)
  - Department of Maritime Systems Engineering
  - Department of Marine Electronics and Mechanical Engineering
  - Department of Logistics and Information Engineering

== Advanced courses ==
- Advanced Course for Maritime Science and Technology
  - a one-year course for the graduates of the Faculty of Marine Science
- Sea Training Course
  - a half-year course for the graduates of the Faculty of Marine Technology

== Graduate schools ==
- Graduate School of Marine Science and Technology (Master's/Doctoral)
